= Hav Plenty (soundtrack) =

Hav Plenty (Music From the Motion Picture)

Soundtrack album by various artists
- Released: June 9, 1998
- Recorded: 1997
- Studio: PatchWerk; Brandon's Way Recording (Los Angeles); Darp Studios (Atlanta); Noontime Recording Studio
- Genre: R&B; hip hop
- Length: 57:55
- Label: Yab Yum; 550 Music; Sony Music Soundtrax
- Producer: Michael McQuarn (exec.); Tracey Edmonds (exec.); Christopher Scott Cherot (co-exec.); Babyface; Chucky Thompson; Deric "D-Dot" Angelettie; DJ Silk; Erykah Badu; Gen Rubin; Joe; Jon B.; Jon-John Robinson; Mark Pitts; Norman "Keys" Hurt; Rashad Smith; Teddy Bishop; Teddy Riley; Warryn Campbell

Professional ratings
Review scores
Source	Rating
AllMusic	3/5 stars

Hav Plenty (Music From the Motion Picture) is the soundtrack to Christopher Scott Cherot's 1997 romantic comedy film Hav Plenty. It was released on June 9, 1998, through Yab Yum Records/550 Music/Sony Music Soundtrax and consisted of mainly contemporary R&B with some hip hop music. The soundtrack peaked at 39 on the Billboard 200 and 6 on the Top R&B/Hip-Hop Albums.

== Track listing ==
No.	Title	Writer(s)	Producer(s)	Length
1.	"Fire" (performed by Babyface and Des'ree)	Bruce Springsteen	Babyface	4:45
2.	"Heat" (performed by Absoulute, Kelly Price and Cha Cha)	Kelly Price; Teddy Bishop	Teddy Bishop	4:05
3.	"Keep It Real" (performed by Jon B., Coko and Jay-Z)	Jonathan Buck; Shawn Carter; Gloria Stewart; Philip "Silky" White	Jon B.	4:41
4.	"I Can't Help It" (performed by Shya)	Raphael Brown; Warryn Campbell	Warryn Campbell	3:35
5.	"I Can't Get You (Out of My Mind) (Remix)" (performed by BLACKstreet featuring Lamenga Kafi and Beverly Crowder)	Eric Williams; Wesley Hogges; Chris Lighty; Teddy Riley; Lamenga Kafi	Teddy Riley	4:43
6.	"Tears Away" (performed by Faith Evans)	Faith Evans; Carl Thompson	Chucky Thompson	5:12
7.	"What the Hell Do You Want" (performed by Az Yet)	Andre Allen; Gen Rubin	Gen Rubin	4:26
8.	"Rock the Body" (performed by Queen Pen and Tracey Lee)	Lynise Walters; Tracey Lee; Deric Angelettie; Mark Pitts; P. Adams; L. Johnson	Deric "D-Dot" Angelettie; Mark Pitts	3:59
9.	"I Wanna Be Where You Are" (performed by SWV)	Leon Ware; Arthur Ross	Chucky Thompson; Rashad Smith	3:58
10.	"What'cha Gonna Do?" (performed by Jayo Felony, Method Man and DMX)	James Savage; Clifford Smith; Earl Simmons; Russell Brown	DJ Silk	4:36
11.	"Any Other Night" (performed by Chico DeBarge)	Joseph Thomas; Joylon Skinner; Joshua Thompson	Joe	4:26
12.	"What I've Been Missin'" (performed by Changing Faces)	Jon-John Robinson; Joey Elias	Jon-John Robinson; Joey Elias (co.)	4:39
13.	"Ye Yo" (performed by Erykah Badu)	Erica Wright	Norman "Keys" Hurt; Erykah Badu	4:51
Total length:				57:55
