= Dana Offenbach =

American film producer

- Occupations: producer and director
- Known for: founder of CinemaStreet Pictures

Dana Offenbach is an American film and television producer and director. She is the founder of CinemaStreet Pictures, LLC. Her credits include feature films, TV, shorts, television commercials, awards show segments, public service announcements, interstitial programming, documentaries and music videos.

Offenbach has produced in India, Brazil, Ireland, South Africa and London.

== Career ==
Offenbach co-produced the indie hit Hav Plenty, which was sold at the Toronto Film Festival to Miramax, and premiered at Sundance in 1998.

In 1999, she produced her second independent feature titled Box Marley for writer/director Christopher Scott Cherot. Offenbach wrote, produced, and directed Love & Orgasms which won World Premiere Honors at the 2003 Ft. Lauderdale International Film Festival, and screened in several festivals both domestically and internationally.

In 2006, Offenbach spent 3 months in India producing The Memsahib, a 1850s period feature, released by Red Letter Pictures in India.

Following that, she independently produced and distributed in a partnership with AMC Theatres, Qasim Basir's Mooz-lum, starring Danny Glover, Evan Ross, Nia Long, Roger Guenveur Smith, and Dorian Missick. She secured independent theatrical distribution in Canada, the UK, Dubai, and Kuwait, as well as DVD, television and digital distribution.

=== CinemaStreet Pictures ===
In 2011, Offenbach opened her indie production company CinemaStreet Pictures, LLC, in her hometown of New York City. Her recent credits include Julius Onah’s The Girl Is in Trouble which was executive produced by Spike Lee was released domestically on multiple platforms (including theatrical) by E One Films on April 3, 2015 and Odin’s Eye.

In 2017, Offenbach wrote, produced and directed "My Sun Sets to Rise Again", which was shot on location in Mumbai, India, in 2016. "My Sun Sets to Rise Again" wins the Honorable Mention in the 2nd Online Annual Shorts Festival in the Drama Category by New York Women in Film & Television and Go Indie TV. My Sun Sets To Rise Again has been distributed internationally by ShortsTV and GoIndie TV.

In 2019 Dana's production company launched a Women's Screenplay contest, which is being managed by longtime New York Women in Film & Television Director Terry Lawler, who retired from her post at Women in Film earlier in the year.

In July 2019, Dana's short film Before It Was True was nominated in multiple categories in the Los Angeles International Film Festival's Indie Short Fest and was one of the winners of the 2019 Moondance Film Festival. The film was written by Brenda Kienan and stars Joan Juliet-Buck, Nicole Ansari-Cox and Lina Todd.

In 2023, Dana produced To Live and Die and Live. On January 20, 2023, the movie had its premiere at the Sundance Film Festival.

In 2023, Offenbach directed her third short film, The 618 to Omaha, a period piece written by Leah Curney and starring Vincent Piazza, Hilarie Burton, and Andrea Rachel Parker. The film premiered at the Big Apple Film Festival.

In 2024, Offenbach finished Love From Friends, a short film written by Elise Marenson and featuring performances by Stella Everett, Alain Surgener, and Reza Salazar. The film screened at the Garden State Film Festival, Montreal International Women's Film Festival, Chelsea International Film Festival, The Women's Film Festival, and Off Page Film Festival.

Offenbach's latest project, Dear America: A Letter From Black Women, is a feature film described as one of her most critical endeavours to date. The project, which amplifies the voices of Black women through personal narratives was showcased at New Jersey Performing Arts Center in 2024.

=== Membership ===
She is a member of the Producers Guild of America and New York Women in Film & Television.

== Filmography ==
=== Producer ===
- Have Plenty (1997) (co-producer)
- Bob Marley (2000) (producer)
- The Life (2002) (executive producer)
- Love & Orgasms (2003) (writer, director, producer)
- Andre Royo's Big Scene (2004) (producer)
- Wait (2005) (line producer)
- The Memsahib (2006) (producer)
- Karma, Confessions and Holi (2009) (co-producer)
- Running America (2009) (supervising producer)
- Mooz-lum (2010) (producer)
- USA in ICU (2010) (director, producer)
- The Girl Is in Trouble (2015) (producer)
- ABFF Awards a Celebration of Hollywood (2016) (TV Special) (segment producer)
- Before It Was True (2019) (producer)
- Love & Orgasms (2020) (producer)
- My Sun Sets to Rise Again (2020) (Short) (executive producer) / (producer)
- 618 to Omaha (Short) (2020) (producer) (post-production)
- To Live and Die and Live (2023) (producer)

=== Director ===
- Dear America: A Letter From Black Women (Documentary) (2024)
- Love From Friends (Short) (2024)
- The 618 to Omaha (Short) (2023)
- Love & Orgasms (2020)
- My Sun Sets to Rise Again (Short) (2020)
- Before It Was True (Short) (2019)
- USA in ICU (Documentary) (2010)

=== Writer ===
- Love & Orgasms (2020) (writer)
- My Sun Sets to Rise Again (2020) (Short)
