= Hill Harper =

American actor and political candidate (born 1966)

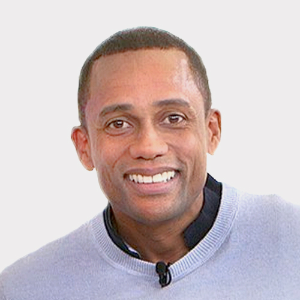
- Harper c. 2013–2016
- Born: Frank Eugene Harper; May 17, 1966 (age 60); Iowa City, Iowa, U.S.
- Other names: Frank Harper; F. Hill Harper
- Education: Brown University (BA); Harvard University (MPA, JD)
- Occupations: Actor; politician; author
- Years active: 1993–present
- Political party: Democratic
- Children: 1

Frank Eugene "Hill" Harper (born May 17, 1966) is an American actor and political candidate, who is known for his roles as Dr. Sheldon Hawkes in CSI: NY, Agent Spelman Boyle in Limitless, and Dr. Marcus Andrews in The Good Doctor.

Harper was a candidate in the Democratic primary in the 2024 United States Senate election in Michigan to fill the seat of retiring incumbent, Senator Debbie Stabenow.

== Early life and education ==
Harper was born in Iowa City, Iowa, the son of two medical doctors. His parents, Harry D. Harper, a psychiatrist, and Marilyn Harper (née Hill), who was one of the first black practicing anesthesiologists in the United States and co-authored a book called Wearing Purple. Born Frank Eugene Harper, he adopted the name "Hill" as a tribute to both his maternal and paternal ancestors.

Harper graduated magna cum laude from Brown University in Providence, Rhode Island in 1988, with a BA degree in economics and sociology. He was also valedictorian of his department. In 1992, he graduated with a JD, cum laude, from Harvard Law School in Cambridge, Massachusetts. He received an MPA degree with honors from John F. Kennedy School at Harvard University. During his years at Harvard, he was a full-time member of Boston's Black Folks Theater Company, one of the oldest and most acclaimed black theater troupes in the United States.

While a student at Harvard, Harper befriended Barack Obama, with whom he played basketball. In 2012, Harper was appointed to The President's Cancer Panel, a three-member body assigned to work with the National Institutes of Health (NIH) and make recommendations to the White House around cancer policy.

He subsequently moved to Los Angeles to pursue acting. He has received eight honorary degrees, including honorary doctorates from both Westfield State College and Howard University.

== Acting career ==
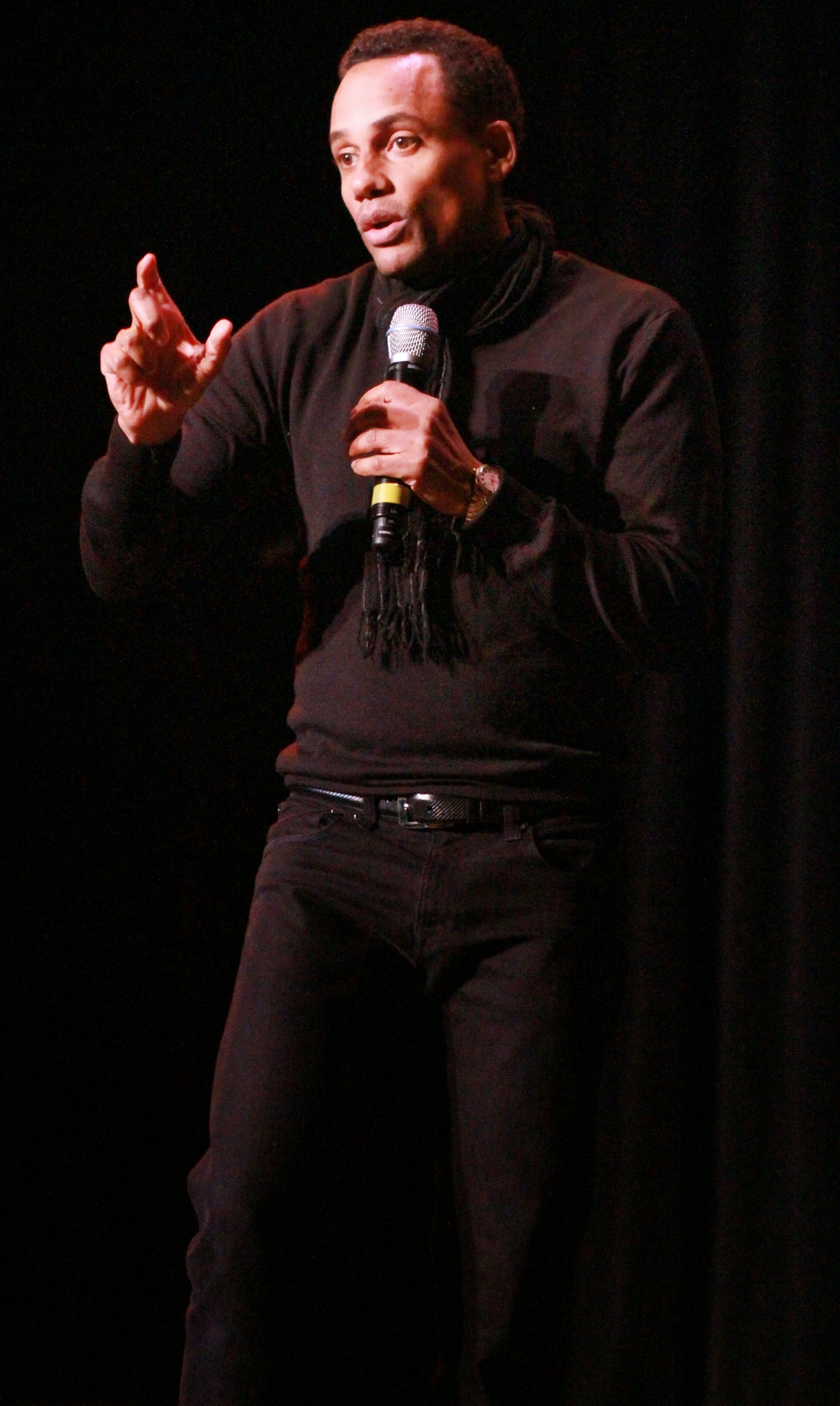
Harper speaking at the Missouri Theatre in 2014

His profile subsequently rose on both the mainstream and independent film circuits, thanks to roles in films ranging from Beloved (1998) to the independent romantic comedy Loving Jezebel (1999) to The Skulls (2000). Harper did some of his most acclaimed work in Jordan Walker-Pearlman's The Visit (2000), an independent drama in which he starred as a prisoner dying of AIDS who tries to put his life back together. He also portrayed Leshem in the 2010 Syfy original movie Stonehenge Apocalypse.

In February 2013, it was announced that CSI: NY would be ending and Harper would be joining the cast of Covert Affairs as a series regular.

From April 21, 2015, to May 10, 2015, Harper starred as "Hard Rock" in the Off-Broadway play ToasT. The play (produced by Lemon Andersen and co-starred Keith David) is set in the Attica Prison around the time of its 1971 prison riot and tells of the lives of its prisoners using poetic prose.

From May 1, 2018, to June 17, 2018, Harper starred as "Rooftop" in the Off-Broadway play Our Lady of 121st Street. This dark comedy (written by Stephen Adly Guirgis and directed by Phylicia Rashad) is about former students paying their respects to Sister Rose, only to find that Sister Rose's body has been stolen.

Hill Harper's acting career also includes voice-over work (or voice acting) with CSI: NY – The Video Game, Breathe Bible, plus, podcasts called Legal Wars and 5-Factor Authentication.

== Writing career and political advocacy ==
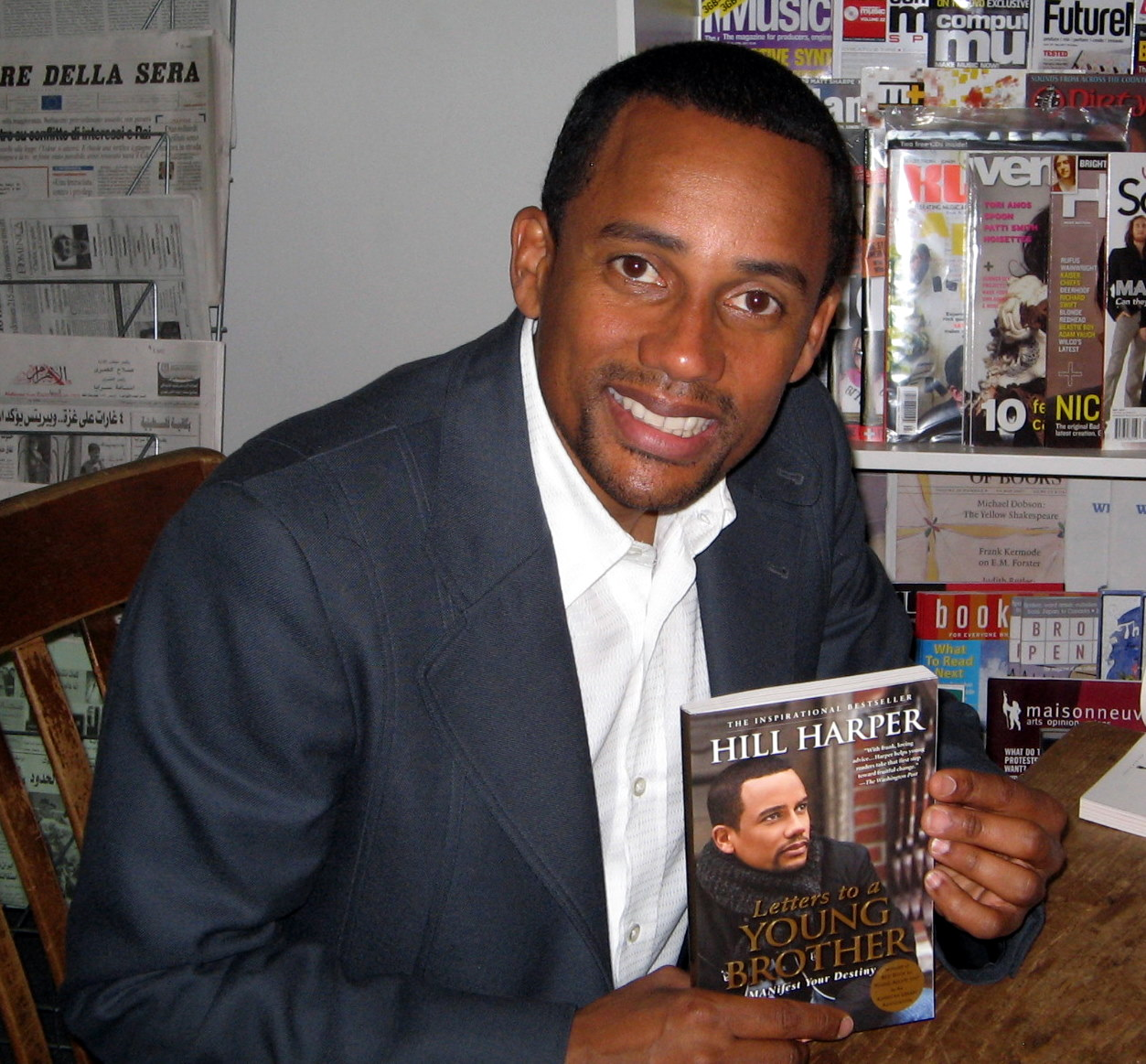
Harper at a book signing in St. Louis in 2007

Harper is the author of several books: Letters to a Young Brother: MANifest Your Destiny, published in 2006; Letters to a Young Sister: DeFINE Your Destiny, published in 2008; and The Conversation: How (Black) Men and Women Can Build Loving, Trusting Relationships, published in 2010. His books, The Wealth Cure: Putting Money in Its Place and The Wiley Boys were both published in 2011. His book, Letters to an Incarcerated Brother: Encouragement, Hope, and Healing for Inmates and Their Loved Ones was published in 2013. Both Barack Obama and Michelle Obama contributed to the books.

In January 2008, Harper participated in "Yes We Can", a music video produced by will.i.am supporting presidential candidate Barack Obama. Harper is a member of the Obama for America National Finance Committee.

Harper endorsed the 10,000 Bookbags back-to-school backpack campaign to help local, disadvantaged children with Urban Change Ministries founder Pastor Jay Cameron of the Life Center, and R&B singer Ginuwine.

On February 22, 2016, the Lawyers' Committee for Civil Rights Under Law announced that Harper would be their national spokesman.

He is also the founder of the Manifest Your Destiny Foundation, which is dedicated to empowering underserved youth through mentorship, scholarship, and grant programs.

== 2024 U.S. Senate candidacy ==
On July 10, 2023, Harper announced his candidacy for the 2024 United States Senate election in Michigan, as a Democrat to replace retiring Senator Debbie Stabenow. He ran to the left of U.S. Representative Elissa Slotkin, describing himself as the "most progressive candidate in the field." Harper touted his support for universal healthcare and the abolition of the filibuster, and if elected, would be the only U.S. senator who is also a union member, due to his membership in SAG-AFTRA.

Harper gained attention in November 2023, after announcing that he had declined an offer of $20 million in campaign contributions that would have been contingent upon him dropping out of the Senate race and mounting a primary challenge against U.S. Representative Rashida Tlaib. He has called for a "humanitarian ceasefire" in Gaza. On August 6, 2024, Harper was defeated in the Democratic Primary by Slotkin.

== Other endeavors ==
=== Be the Architect ===
After being diagnosed with thyroid cancer, Harper researched the effects skin care products can have on a person's system. This led to his creating an all-natural personal care line for men and women, called Be the Architect.

=== The Black Wall Street ===
On May 31, 2021, Hill Harper & his partners launched The Black Wall Street, a web3 digital platform and financial literacy tool aimed at addressing the racial wealth gap.

=== Annual Leadership Summit and Lobby Day ===
In 2016, Harper was a keynote at the Annual Leadership Summit and Lobby Day.

== Awards and recognition ==
In the fall of 2008, Harper was initiated as a member of the Alpha Phi Alpha fraternity with his Co-Initiates (called "Line Brothers") Dr. Naim Akbar of Florida State University and former NFL player Leo LeMarcus Newman.

He was also a recipient of the 2011 Freedom Award, which honors individuals who have made significant contributions in civil rights and who have laid the foundation for present and future leaders in the battle for human rights. The award was conferred upon Harper from the National Civil Rights Museum in Memphis for "his nonprofit foundation, [the] Manifest Your Destiny Foundation."

In 2018, the Audience Development Committee, Inc. (AUDELCO) nominated Hill Harper for a Vivian Robinson Award; Lead Actor in a Play, for his role as Walter "Rooftop" Desmond in the Off-Broadway play: Our Lady of 121st Street.

On Sunday, December 5, 2021, the Boston, Massachusetts' Museum of African American History honored Hill Harper with a Living Legends award - The Garrison Silver Cup.

People magazine named Hill Harper as one of the "Sexiest Men Alive" for 2004, and again for 2014.

== Personal life ==
While writing his book The Wealth Cure: Putting Money In Its Place, Harper was diagnosed with thyroid cancer. After treatment, he was given a clean bill of health.

In November 2015, Harper received a call to adopt a baby boy. He agreed, and by May 2017, the adoption was finalized.

In 2018, Harper purchased and moved into the historic Charles T. Fisher Mansion in Detroit, Michigan.

== Filmography ==
=== Film ===
Year	Title	Role	Notes
1993	Pumpkinhead II: Blood Wings	Peter	
1995	Drifting School	Sam	
1996	Get on the Bus	Xavier "X" Moore	
1997	Steel	"Slats"	
1997	Hav Plenty	Michael Simmons	
1997	Hoover Park		
1998	The Nephew	Chad Egan-Washington	
1998	He Got Game	Coleman "Booger" Sykes	
1998	Park Day	Steve Johnson	
1998	Beloved	Halle	
1999	Slaves of Hollywood	Fisher Lovelace	Feature Film
1999	Loving Jezebel	Theodorous Melville	
1999	In Too Deep	"Breezy T"	
2000	The Skulls	Will Beckford	
2000	The Visit	Alex Waters	Nominated—Independent Spirit Award for Best Male Lead
2001	Higher Ed	Craig	
2002	The Badge	"Gizmo"	
2003	Love, Sex and Eating the Bones	Michael Joseph	
2004	America Brown	John Cross	
2005	Constellation	Errol Hickman	
2006	Max and Josh	Max	Short film
2006	Premium	Ed	
2006	The Breed	Noah	
2006	30 Days	Donnell	
2006	Whitepaddy	Marshall Evans	
2008	A Good Man Is Hard to Find	Damion Marshall	
2008	This Is Not a Test	Carl	
2010	For Colored Girls	Donald Watkins	
2011	Mama, I Want to Sing!	Jeff Andrews	
2011	The Shanghai Hotel	Carlos	
2013	Miss Dial	Political Nutcase	
2013	The Volunteer	Phil	
2013	1982	Tim Brown	
2014	Parts per Billion	Rick	
2015	The Boy Next Door	Principal Edward Warren	
2015	Pearly Gates	Dave	
2015	Concussion	Christopher Jones	
2016	Destined	Mayor Jones	
2017	All Eyez on Me	Journalist	Biographical film debuted Friday, June 16, 2017; what would have been Tupac Shakur's 46th birthday.
2018	An Interview with God	Gary	Theater Release Dates: August 20, 21 & 22, 2018 only.
2019	The Sun Is Also a Star	Lester Barnes	Film debuted Friday, May 17, 2019, on Hill Harper's 53rd birthday.
2020	The Prison Within	Himself / The Narrator	Documentary
TBA	Shadowbox		Harper is also an Executive Producer. The film's Developmental Short is called "Butterfly Boxing".

=== Television ===
Year	Title	Role	Notes
1993	Life Goes On	Nurse #2	Episode: "Incident on Main"
1993–1994	Married... with Children	Aaron Mitchell	5 episodes
1994	Renegade	Clarence "Dex" Dexter	Episode: "South of 98"
1994	M.A.N.T.I.S.	Tyrell D. Nickens	Episode: "Tango Blue"
1994	Walker, Texas Ranger	B.J. Mays	Episode: "Badge of Honor"
1994	The Fresh Prince of Bel-Air	Dana	Episode: "Will Steps Out"
1995	The Client	"J-Top"	Episode: "Them That Has..."
1995	Live Shot	Tommy Greer	Main role; 13 episodes
1996	NYPD Blue	"Bo-Bo" Thomas	Episode: "The Blackboard Jungle"
1996	Dangerous Minds	Darryl	Episode: "Family Ties"
1997	Oddville, MTV		Episode No. 44
1997	ER	Mr. Jackson	Episode: "Obstruction of Justice"
1998	Cosby	Preston	Episode: "Men Are from Mars Women Are from Astoria"
1998	Mama Flora's Family	Don	Television film
2000	City of Angels	Dr. Wesley Williams	Main role; 24 episodes Nominated—NAACP Image Award for Outstanding Supporting Actor in a Drama Series
2002	The Court	Christopher Bell	Unsold TV pilot
2002	The Twilight Zone	Professor John Woodrell	Episode: "Shades of Guilt"
2003–2004	The Handler	Darnell	Main role; 16 episodes Nominated—Satellite Award for Best Supporting Actor – Television Series
2004	Soul Food	Kelvin Chadway	2 episodes
2004	The Sopranos	Stokley Davenport M.D.	Episode: "Irregular Around the Margins"
2004	CSI: Miami	Dr. Sheldon Hawkes	Episode: "MIA/NYC NonStop"
2004–2013	CSI: NY	Dr. Sheldon Hawkes	Main role; 197 episodes NAACP Image Award for Outstanding Actor in a Drama Series (2008–10); Nominated—NAACP Image Award for Outstanding Actor in a Drama Series (2005–07, 2011–13)
2005	I Love the '90s: Part Deux	Himself	Documentary miniseries
2005	The 4400	Edwin Mayuya	Episode: "Rebirth"
2005	Lackawanna Blues	Ruben Santiago Jr. (Adult)	Television film
2009	The Game	Himself	Episode: "Hill Street Blues"
2010	Stonehenge Apocalypse	Joseph Lesham	Television film
2011	The Real Housewives of Atlanta	Himself	Episode: "Tour-Ture"
2013–2014	Covert Affairs	Calder Michaels	Main role, 32 episodes
2015	Madam Secretary	Aiden Humphrey	Episode: "The Kill List"
2015–2016	Limitless	Spelman Boyle	Main role; 22 episodes Character named after Spelman College.
2016	Braxton Family Values	Himself	Episode: "You Gotta Get Pelvic to Pelvic!"
2016	Unsung Hollywood	Himself	Episode: "Hill Harper"
2017	The Real Housewives of Potomac	Himself	Episode: "Don't Let the Zip Code Fool Ya"
2017	Homeland	Chief of Staff, Rob Emmons	11 episodes
2017–2021	How It Really Happened	Himself	Host and Narrator of 12-episode anthology reality series.
2017–2024	The Good Doctor	Dr. Marcus Andrews	105 episodes
2018	Black Love	Himself	Special Episode: "Motherly Love"
2019	The $100,000 Pyramid	Himself	Episode 409 (Season 4; Episode 9)
2020	Mentoring Kings	Himself	Docuseries
2022	Super Pumped	Eric Holder	Episode: "Delete Uber"
2025	Law & Order	Defense Attorney Eric Ferguson	Episode: "Bend the Knee"

=== Theatre ===
Year	Title	Role
2001	Dogeaters	Joey Sands
2001	Blue	(Adult) Reuben Clark
2015	ToasT	Hard Rock
2018	Our Lady of 121st Street	Walter "Rooftop" Desmond

== Published works ==
- Harper, Hill (2007). Letters to a Young Brother: Manifest Your Destiny. Gotham. ISBN 978-1592402496.
- Harper, Hill (2009). Letters to a Young Sister: DeFINE Your Destiny. Gotham. ISBN 978-1592404599.
- Harper, Hill (2010). The Conversation: How (Black) Men and Women Can Build Loving, Trusting Relationships. Gotham. ISBN 978-1592405787.
- Harper, Hill (2011). The Wealth Cure: Putting Money in Its Place. Gotham. ISBN 978-1592406500.
- Harper, Hill (2011). The Wiley Boys. Harper Hill. ISBN 978-0974721873.
- Harper, Hill (2013). Letters to an Incarcerated Brother: Encouragement, Hope, and Healing for Inmates and Their Loved Ones. Gotham. ISBN 978-1592407248.
