= Curtis Craig =

Curtis Craig may refer to:

- Curtis Craig, plaintiff in Craig v. Boren
- Curtis Craig, protagonist of Phantasmagoria: A Puzzle of Flesh
- Curtis "Durty Curt from Detroit" Craig, character from Doing Hard Time
