= Qasim Basir =

American filmmaker

- Born: Detroit, Michigan, U.S.
- Occupation: Filmmaker
- Relatives: Maryam Basir

Qasim Basir is an American filmmaker. He wrote and directed Mooz-lum (2011) starring Danny Glover and Nia Long about an African-American Muslim family and how their lives are changed by the September 11 attacks. The film received nominations from the NAACP Image Awards and Black Reel Awards.

Basir also wrote and directed Destined (2016) starring Cory Hardrict. Basir won Best Director at the American Black Film Festival.

Basir's film A Boy. A Girl. A Dream. starring Omari Hardwick and Meagan Good has been selected for the 2018 Sundance Film Festival. His next film To Live and Die and Live premiered at the 2023 Sundance Film Festival. He later co-wrote alongside Andre Gaines the script for The Dutchman based on the 1964 play of the same name by Amiri Baraka.

== Filmography ==
- Glimpse (short, 2007) — director, writer, actor
- I Used to Love Her (2008) — producer, editor
- The Inspiration of Barack (short, 2008) — director, writer, producer, editor
- Mooz-lum (2010) — director, writer, actor
- Destined (2016) — director, writer
- A Boy. A Girl. A Dream. (2018) — director, writer
- To Live and Die and Live (2023) — director, writer, producer
- The Dutchman (2025) — writer
- He Looked like a Postcard — director
