= Cold Feet (disambiguation) =

Cold Feet is a UK comedy-drama television series.

Cold Feet may also refer to:

- Cold feet, apprehension or doubt strong enough to prevent a planned course of action
- Project COLDFEET, a CIA operation in 1962
- Cold Feet (American TV series), the US version of the UK series
- Cold Feet (1922 film), a comedy short film directed by Al Christie
- Cold Feet (1983 film), a comedy film starring Griffin Dunne
- Cold Feet (1989 film), a comedy film starring Keith Carradine
- Cold Feet (1999 film), a drama film starring Chenoa Maxwell
- "Cold Feet!", a 1990 episode of The Raccoons
- "Cold Feet", a song by Tracy Chapman from New Beginning
- "Cold Feet", a 2020 song by Loud Luxury

== See also ==
- Chilblain
- Immersion foot, aka trench foot
- Frostbite
- Hypothyroidism
- Peripheral neuropathy
- Peripheral artery occlusive disease, aka peripheral vascular disease
- Raynaud's phenomenon
  - Raynaud's disease
