= Chenoa Maxwell =

American actress and photographer (born 1969)

- Born: Chenoa N. Maxwell; November 16, 1969 (age 56)
- Occupations: Actress; photographer
- Known for: Girlfriends, Hav Plenty, G
- Website: livelimitlessly.com

Chenoa N. Maxwell (born November 16, 1969) is an American actress and photographer.

== Career ==
Maxwell is best known for her starring role in the 1997 romantic comedy Hav Plenty and as the recurring character Lena Turner on the hit UPN sitcom Girlfriends. Maxwell starred in docu-reality show Love In The City on OWN, Oprah Winfrey Network. Maxwell has also appeared in the WB sitcom For Your Love and in the 2002 film G, a modernized, loosely-based adaptation of The Great Gatsby starring Richard T. Jones and Blair Underwood, and directed by Christopher Scott Cherot. She appeared in R&B singer Joe's video, What if a Woman. She also had a cameo in the infomercial for 'Yoga Booty Ballet'. Maxwell also appears frequently as a guest expert on WEtv’s Growing Up Hip-Hop.

In 2006, she moved to London to study photography. Her first solo art exhibit, Introspection: India, ran for one month at the Papillion Institute of Art in Los Angeles in March 2011. Her work has been exhibited in the Bay Area, New York City, and Italy.

== Filmography ==
=== Film ===
Year	Title	Role	Notes
1997	Hav Plenty	Havilland Savage	
1999	Cold Feet	Denise	
2001	Sacred Is the Flesh	Erica Fontaine	
2001	Malfunction	Fadhi	
2002	G	Sky Hightower	
2004	Doing Hard Time	Elise	Direct-to-video
2009	Lenox Avenue	Madison	

=== Television ===
Year	Title	Role	Notes
1999	For Your Love	Angelic	Episode: "The Trouble with Angels"
2003–2005	Girlfriends	Lena Turner	4 episodes
2014	Love in the City	—N/a	8 episodes; reality TV series
2016	Unsung	—N/a	Episode: "Hill Harper"
2019	Growing Up Hip Hop	—N/a	Episode: "Is That the Joker?"
