= Oprah Winfrey Network =

American pay television network

- Broadcast area: United States
- Headquarters: Burbank, California, U.S.

Programming
- Picture format: HDTV 1080i (downscaled to letterboxed 480i for the standard definition feeds)

Ownership
- Owner: Skydance Corporation (95%); Harpo Productions (5%)
- Key people: Oprah Winfrey (CEO); Tina Perry (president); Neal Kirsch (COO and CFO)
- Sister channels: see list of assets owned by Skydance Corporation

History
- Launched: January 1, 2011; 15 years ago
- Replaced: Discovery Health Channel

Links
- Website: http://www.oprah.com/own

Availability

Streaming media
- Affiliated streaming service(s): HBO Max; Discovery+
- Philo: Internet Protocol television (IPTV)
- YouTube TV: IPTV
- Hulu + Live TV: IPTV
- DirecTV Stream: IPTV

OWN: Oprah Winfrey Network (OWN, also known as the OWN Network) is an American multinational basic cable television network which launched on January 1, 2011, effectively replacing the Discovery Health Channel, which one month later merged with FitTV to become Discovery Fit & Health (now known as Discovery Life). OWN is owned by Skydance Corporation's networks division, with a minority stake by Harpo Productions.

Founded by television personality Oprah Winfrey, the channel primarily focuses on lifestyle programming targeting a female audience, with an initial focus on programming with themes related to life improvement, relationships, and spirituality, and a particular focus on targeting African Americans.

Initially a 50/50 joint venture, Discovery acquired a larger stake in the network in 2017 and again in December 2020, when Discovery increased its ownership in OWN from 73% to 95%. Harpo remains a "significant" minority stakeholder, and Winfrey remains contracted with the channel. OWN competes with other networks aimed at African Americans such as the now-sister BET Media Group's namesake channel and the E. W. Scripps Company's Bounce TV. As of February 2015, OWN is available to approximately 81.9 million pay television households (70.3% of households with television) in the United States.

== History ==
=== Development ===
After becoming Discovery Communications' new CEO in 2007, David Zaslav found Discovery Health to be underperforming along with its other digital cable networks launched in the last decade, and having significantly lower carriage fees in comparison to the company's namesake, Discovery Channel. As a result, he began to explore the possibility of relaunching the channel as a joint venture with another partner. Zaslav's wife was an avid reader of Oprah Winfrey's O magazine (a joint venture with Hearst Corporation); believing that her values could serve as the basis for a cable network, he contacted Winfrey's agents to hold a meeting in April 2007. On January 15, 2008, Discovery Communications officially announced that it had entered into a joint venture with Winfrey's studio Harpo Productions, under which it would relaunch Discovery Health as "OWN: The Oprah Winfrey Network", in the second half of 2009.

Winfrey would serve as the chairwoman of the channel, which was expected to deal in factual programming oriented towards her personal philosophy of "living your best life"; this would include topics such as health, love, parenting, and spirituality. Discovery provided $100 million in funding, and Harpo provided access to its library and Winfrey's website, Oprah.com. As it was still under contract with CBS Television Distribution through May 2011, her existing syndicated talk show The Oprah Winfrey Show could not initially air on OWN, but there was a possibility that a spiritual continuation or successor to the program could air on OWN in the future.

Winfrey and her long-time partner Stedman Graham had discussed the idea of forming her own channel as early as 1992. After Winfrey demonstrated discontent over "confrontational" talk shows on television, Graham suggested that she should form an "Oprah Winfrey Network" if she were dissatisfied with the current state of television. OWN was not Winfrey's first cable television venture, having been co-founder of the women's cable network Oxygen. However, her involvement was limited to being an investor and eventually offering it an after-show component, Oprah After the Show, after deciding not to offer her reruns to the network; Winfrey distanced herself from Oxygen when discussing OWN, stressing the importance of actually having influence over programming when participating in such ventures.

==== Delays and launch ====
In November 2008, Zaslav stated that Winfrey had planned to not renew her contract with CBS for The Oprah Winfrey Show beyond the 2010–2011 season, and that the show could move to OWN in some form following the end of the syndicated run. Harpo Productions denied the report, stating that Winfrey did not declare her decision at the time to continue the show on syndication after 2011. The development of OWN was affected by internal conflicts, as well as Winfrey's continued commitment to her talk show. Its launch was delayed from its originally-announced target of 2009 to an unspecified date. Zaslav pressured Oprah into moving her talk show to the channel, believing that it could expand its business.

In November 2009, Lisa Erspamer, a Harpo executive who had been a co-executive producer of The Oprah Winfrey Show starting in 2006, was named chief creative officer of OWN. Due to her history of working with Winfrey, the appointment of Erspamer was seen as having stabilized OWN's development; network CEO Christina Norman described Erspamer's appointment as being an "injection of Oprah's DNA" into the then-upcoming channel. Later on November 20, Winfrey officially announced that The Oprah Winfrey Show would conclude in 2011, after its 25th season. With the end of her talk show, Winfrey's commitments with Discovery were revised; a commitment for Winfrey to host a talk show on OWN and appear in at least 35 hours of programming per year, was replaced with a commitment to appear in at least 70 hours of programming per year, including Oprah's Next Chapter (later Oprah Prime), a primetime interview series hosted by Winfrey.

The official launch of OWN was set for January 1, 2011, so that it would occur while Oprah's talk show was still on the air. Plans were then called for at least 600 hours of original programming in 2011, as well as acquired and library programming (including reruns of The Oprah Winfrey Show later in the year, and Dr. Phil); although Winfrey did make appearances in some of the programming aired on-launch (such as Oprah's Master Class), her involvement was expected to increase following the end of The Oprah Winfrey Show. After the launch of OWN, Discovery Health's programming was merged into another Discovery-owned channel, FitTV, which rebranded as Discovery Fit & Health a month later on February 1, 2011. It was subsequently rebranded again as Discovery Life in 2015.

=== Early struggles, targeting African Americans ===
During its first year of operation, OWN struggled to build an audience and viewership, with most of its programs being low-rated besides Our America with Lisa Ling (the first OWN program to be renewed for a second season), and Season 25: Oprah Behind the Scenes. Its average viewership was 135,000 during its second month on air, which was lower than that of Discovery Health. Norman defended the network's ratings, stating that first-run broadcasts of its original series were drawing larger audiences than those of Discovery Health, and that Discovery's goal was to improve OWN's monthly audience to between 50 and 60 million viewers by the end of the year. In March 2011, the channel modified its schedule to only have three original nights of primetime programming per-week, moving Oprah Behind the Scenes to Sunday nights alongside Oprah's Master Class.

On May 6, 2011, OWN's CEO Christina Norman was removed, and replaced by Discovery executive Peter Liguori as an interim CEO. In July, Winfrey assumed the role of CEO, and named Sheri Salata as a co-president. By September 2011, Discovery had invested $254 million in programming for OWN. The October 2011 premiere of Welcome to Sweetie Pie's brought notable gains to the channel: it was the network's highest-rated series at the time, and expanded OWN's average primetime viewership to 216,000. The show was especially popular among African American audiences, which prompted OWN's executives to factor this demographic into its programming decisions and advertising sales going forward. On October 16, 2011, the Sunday program, Super Soul Sunday, premirered, which included features and segments that "present an array of perspectives on what it means to be alive in today's world."

The Rosie Show, a talk show hosted by another formerly-syndicated personality, Rosie O'Donnell, also premiered in October, to an average of 497,000 viewers (along with an additional million via a simulcast across sister channels Discovery Fit & Health, Investigation Discovery, Planet Green, and TLC). By November, its ratings had fallen to an average of 171,000 nightly viewers. In January 2012, an attempt was made to retool the program by hiring Shane Farley (producer of the syndicated Rosie O'Donnell Show), and giving it a smaller, more intimate studio. However, viewership was still low, and the series was cancelled in March 2012.

During its first year of operations, OWN's average primetime audience was 264,000 viewers. This was only slightly higher than the average primetime audience of 216,000 the channel had as Discovery Health. On January 26, 2012, Lisa Erspamer resigned from OWN; she was replaced in the interim by veteran Discovery executive and former TLC vice president Rita Mullin. A March 2012 Oprah's Next Chapter interview with Whitney Houston's daughter Bobbi Kristina Brown and her family (following Houston's death in February) became OWN's highest-rated special, with 3.5 million viewers.

The channel's losses were estimated to be $330 million by May 2012. Discovery responded by raising the channel's retransmission consent fee (OWN was provided to cable providers effectively for free for its first two years on air) to a level more in line with other basic cable channels, a move that the company expected to allow the channel to break even in late-2013.

On September 15, 2012, OWN premiered Iyanla: Fix My Life, a reality series starring Iyanla Vanzant. It attracted critical acclaim and high audience; its two-night premiere event was seen by 1.1 and 1.6 million total viewers respectively. The Sunday-night airing was the third-highest-rated program of the night across ad-supported cable networks, and was the highest-rated program of the night among women 18-49 and African American women 25–54.

=== Tyler Perry development deal, expansion into scripted programming ===
By October 2012, OWN had seen increases in audience share, especially among women in the key demographic. That month, OWN also announced a planned expansion into scripted programming by means of an exclusive, multi-year development deal with Tyler Perry, a long-time friend of Winfrey. Perry's first two productions for OWN, the primetime soap opera The Haves and the Have Nots, and the sitcom Love Thy Neighbor, premiered on May 28 and 29, 2013 respectively. The two-hour series premiere of The Haves and the Have Nots overtook Life with La Toya (1.18 million) as OWN's highest-rated series premiere at the time, with the first episode attracting 1.77 million viewers, and growing to 1.8 million for the second. The series continued to set viewership records for the channel, with its first-season finale drawing 2.6 million viewers, and the fifth episode of season 2 setting a network-record 3.6 million viewers.

By July 2013, Discovery considered the network to be "cash flow positive". In an interview with People, Winfrey revealed that in 2012, she had a nervous breakdown over the channel's performance. Jason Russell commented on the condition during an interview they were filming, which made Winfrey realize she was experiencing similar symptoms. She explained that "after 25 years of being number one, I had become accustomed to success. I didn't expect failure. I was tested and I had to dig deep", and that the scenario "forced me not to just talk the talk. Failure is a great teacher. I knew this intellectually. But it's another thing if you're living it".

In May 2016, Sheri Salata resigned as co-president to launch a new "brand innovation" agency (although Winfrey and OWN were expected to be among her first clients). This left Erik Logan as sole president of the network. The June 2016 premiere of Greenleaf was OWN's highest-rated series premiere, with 3.04 million viewers. Queen Sugar also premiered later in September to acclaim, with both series ranking among the top five ad-supported drama series on cable among women 25–54.

In July 2017, Tyler Perry signed a new film and television/short form development deal with Viacom for future productions (particularly on BET) through 2024; the film deal began immediately, while the television/short form deal would begin after the end of his partnership with OWN in May 2019. OWN stated that Perry's series would continue to air on the network through at least 2020, and that it would "continue to aggressively expand its roster of premium original scripted series." In August 2017, OWN premiered Black Love, a docuseries from filmmakers Codie Elaine and Tommy Oliver on relationships within African-American communities. It was OWN's highest-rated unscripted series premiere with 1.2 million viewers.

In December 2017, Discovery announced that it would acquire an additional 24.5% stake in OWN that it did not already own, for $70 million, with Harpo remaining as a significant minority shareholder, and Winfrey remaining CEO. Winfrey also extended her exclusivity agreement with the network and Discovery through 2025. In April 2018, OWN ordered two new series from Will Packer, the drama Ambitions and the dating show Ready to Love. In July 2018, Winfrey signed a non-exclusive, multi-platform content deal with Apple Inc.; this did not affect her role at OWN.

Wired considered OWN to have had a "major stake" in the push towards more diverse portrayals of African Americans in television, while Iyanla Vanzant argued that OWN had been "celebrating the unseen" among African Americans with shows that "give the minds of the viewers a different interpretation than the one that's often put out in the world."

In October 2018, network president Erik Logan announced that he would resign at the end of the year to pursue a job as head of content for the World Surf League. He was succeeded by Tina Perry, who had worked business and legal affairs for MTV, VH1, and OWN.

On June 9 and 10, 2020, OWN broadcast OWN Spotlight: Where Do We Go From Here?, a two-night special hosted by Winfrey that discussed systemic racism and police brutality in U.S. society following protests over the police murder of George Floyd. The special featured appearances by politicians such as Stacey Abrams and Mayor of Atlanta Keisha Lance Bottoms, and other journalists and personalities. The special was simulcast by all Discovery networks, and was seen by an average of 7.3 million viewers across both nights. Amid the concurrent COVID-19 pandemic, the channel also aired two remotely-produced series for its "Sisterhood Saturday Night" block, Fear Not with Iyanla Vanzant and the celebrity talk show Girlfriends Check In.

In December 2020, Discovery increased its ownership in OWN from 73% to 95% for $35 million in an all-stock deal, giving Harpo approximately 1.34 million shares in Discovery.

In April 2022, Discovery Inc. merged with WarnerMedia to form Warner Bros. Discovery; the acquisition places OWN under common ownership with Warner Bros. Television, which has produced a number of OWN's recent scripted series.

== Programming ==
As of 2025, the network's programming consists primarily of lifestyle programming, including syndicated reruns of talk and court shows (particularly Dr. Phil, Hot Bench, and Judge Mathis), and reruns of library lifestyle programming from other Warner Bros. Discovery channels.

=== Scripted programming ===
In October 2012, OWN expanded into scripted programming by announcing an exclusive development deal with Tyler Perry, beginning with The Haves and the Have Nots and Love Thy Neighbor. In February 2013, OWN ordered a third season of Perry's canceled TBS sitcom For Better or Worse. In January 2014, OWN ordered another drama from Perry, If Loving You Is Wrong, which was adapted from Perry's feature film The Single Moms Club. In February 2015, OWN ordered new seasons of For Better Or Worse, The Haves and the Have Nots, If Loving You Is Wrong, and Love Thy Neighbor. In November 2017, OWN announced premiere dates for The Paynes (a spin-off of Perry's TBS sitcom Tyler Perry's House of Payne), as well as the fifth and fourth seasons of The Haves and the Have Nots and If Loving You Is Wrong.

On February 2, 2015, OWN announced that it had ordered Ava DuVernay's drama Queen Sugar (based on the Natalie Baszile novel of the same name) directly to series, marking OWN's first scripted series not produced by Tyler Perry. This was followed in July by Greenleaf, a drama from Craig Wright with Winfrey as an executive producer, that follows the eponymous family's predominantly-African American megachurch in Memphis, Tennessee.

In July 2017, Queen Sugar was renewed for a third season, and Harpo Films signed DuVernay to a first-look television and digital media deal. In August 2017, OWN also ordered Tarell Alvin McCraney's David Makes Man, a coming-of-age drama set in South Florida. McCraney stated that he was given offers by other outlets such as Netflix, but that Winfrey (who had made a surprise visit when he visited the network to pitch the series) "from the start was wanting to open the story up and understand what it was about".

OWN cancelled The Paynes in August 2019.

On August 20, 2021, it was reported that OWN was in negotiations to revive the canceled CBS legal drama All Rise. On September 29, 2021, the series was renewed for a third season scheduled to premiere in 2022; OWN acquired linear rights, while HBO Max and Hulu jointly acquired streaming rights.

On January 10, 2026, OWN debuted Maxxed Out, a reality series that follows host Leah Collins as she advises individuals and families experiencing debt and financial strain. Maxxed Out received a 2026 Critics Choice nomination for "Best Business Show."

== International ==
In Canada, the former Canadian version of Discovery Health, owned by Shaw Media, did not become a Canadian version of OWN, instead shifting to a reality-based format known as Twist TV (now the Canadian version of FYI). Instead, Corus Entertainment agreed to launch a Canadian version of OWN, its existing channel Viva was relaunched as OWN on March 1, 2011. On September 1, 2024, due to Corus' rights removal to most WBD lifestyle and factual brands, OWN was closed down. On January 1, 2025, Rogers Sports and Media acquired all the rights, including OWN, moving its content to Citytv+. During January and February 2011, selected OWN programming aired on both Viva and the co-owned W Network. Both Shaw Media and Corus share common ownership interests from the J.R. Shaw family, but were considered separate companies. In 2011, Winfrey revealed to The New York Times that she was in final negotiations to launch the channel in Brazil and Argentina.

In April 2013, TLC UK began to air an OWN block. The same programming block began airing Discovery Home & Health in Australia on August 4, 2013. It was announced on September 20, 2013, that the OWN Programming Block would begin airing in South Africa on DStv beginning October 17, 2013. OWN Programming Block also debuted in Poland and Russia in August and September; it also debuted on October 28, 2013, in Balkans/Romania/Bulgaria.

== See also ==
- List of United States pay television channels
