= Tommy Oliver (producer) =

American film producer

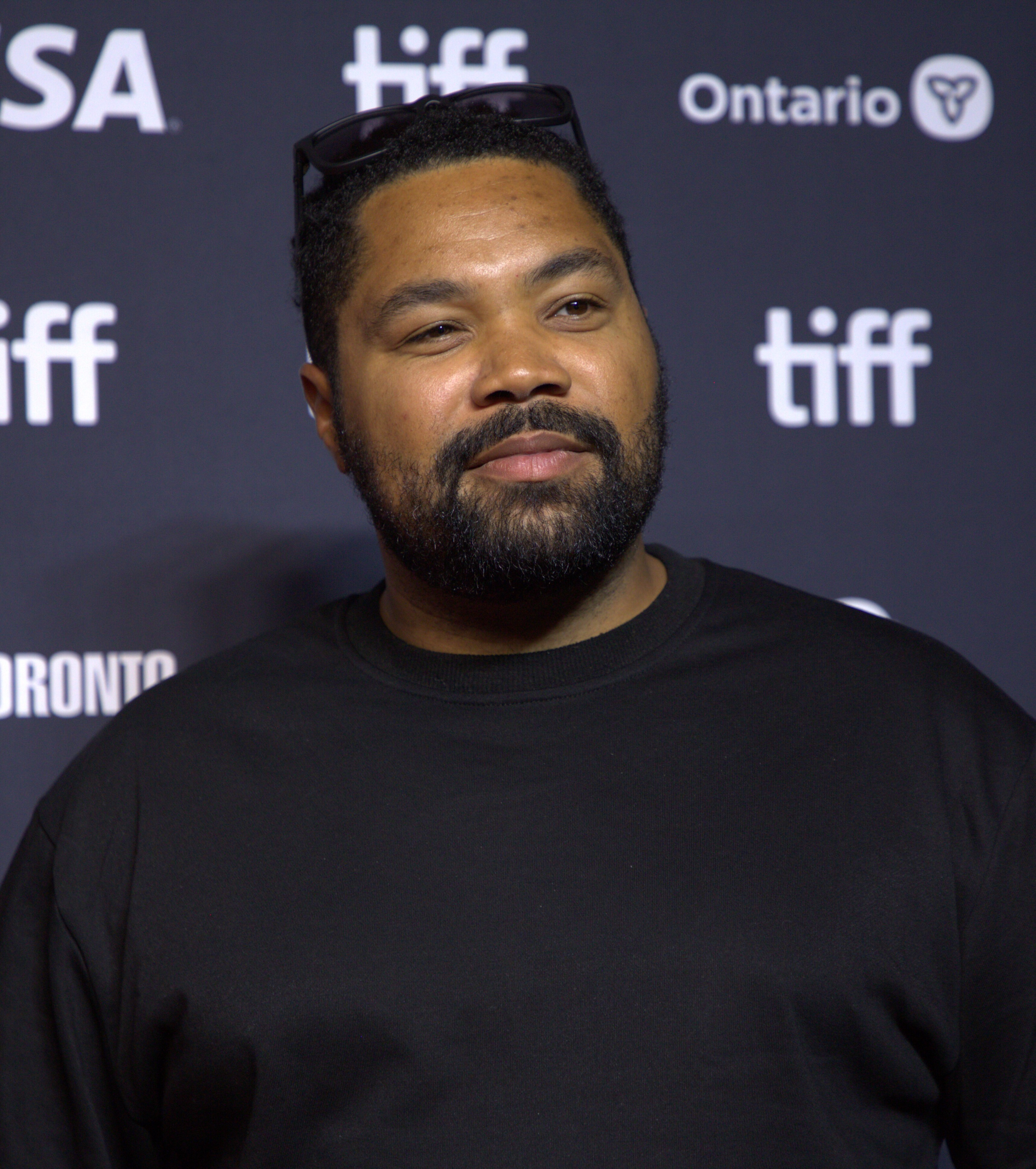
- Oliver in 2025 at TIFF.

Tommy Oliver is an Emmy-winning and Sundance Film Festival-winning American film producer, director, writer, cinematographer, photographer, financier, entrepreneur, and CEO and Founder of Confluential Films, He directed, produced, shot, and edited AFI Film Festival audience award winner Juice Wrld: Into The Abyss (2021), 40 Years a Prisoner, and 1982, and produced four Sundance Film Festival 2023 films including Young. Wild. Free., Fancy Dance, To Live and Die and Live (EP), and the Grand Jury Prize winner, Going to Mars: The Nikki Giovanni Project. He also produced The Perfect Find (2023), The Perfect Guy (2015) and Sundance Film Festival and AFI Film Festival audience award winner Kinyarwanda, and co-created and Executive Produced the documentary series Black Love.

Oliver is also known for his photography including his 70+ photos in the Smithsonian National Museum of African American History and Culture.

Oliver is from Philadelphia, a Carnegie Mellon University alum, and Founder and chairman of the media company Black Love, Inc. which he founded with his wife, Codie Elaine Oliver. He is on the Board of the Philadelphia Film Society.

== Select filmography ==
- Kinyarwanda (2011; producer)
- 1982 (2013; writer, director, producer, and editor)
- The Perfect Guy (2015; producer)
- Halfway (2016; executive producer)
- Destined (2016; producer)
- Black Love (2017–2022; creator and executive producer)
- 40 Years a Prisoner (2020; director, producer, cinematographer, and editor)
- Juice Wrld: Into the Abyss (2021; director, producer, cinematographer, and editor)
- Going to Mars: The Nikki Giovanni Project (2023; producer)
- Fancy Dance (2023; producer)
- To Live and Die and Live (2023; executive producer)
- Young. Wild. Free. (2023; producer)
- The Perfect Find (2023; producer)
- Hamlet (2025; producer)
