= The Girl Is in Trouble =

- Theatrical release poster
- Directed by: Julius Onah
- Written by: Julius Onah; Mayuran Tiruchelvam
- Produced by: Julius Onah; Robert Profusek; Ryan Silbert; Jen Gatien; Dana Offenbach; Mark Campbell
- Starring: Columbus Short; Wilmer Valderrama; Paz de la Huerta; Alicja Bachleda; Jesse Spencer
- Cinematography: Richard Lopez
- Edited by: Sabine Hoffmann
- Music by: Gregg Lehrman
- Production companies: Deerjen Films; Toy Closet Films; CinemaStreet Pictures; RCR Partners; Kings Crown Films; NVSBL Film
- Distributed by: Entertainment One
- Release date: April 3, 2015
- Country: United States
- Language: English

The Girl Is in Trouble is a 2015 American thriller film co-produced and directed by Julius Onah, who co-wrote it with Mayuran Tiruchelvam. It stars Columbus Short, Wilmer Valderrama, Paz de la Huerta, Alicja Bachleda, and Jesse Spencer.

The Girl Is in Trouble was simultaneously released theatrically and on video on demand in the United States on April 3, 2015, by Entertainment One. The film received mixed reviews from critics.

== Plot ==
August, a Lower East Side bartender, becomes entangled in a murder mystery involving Signe, a desperate woman, Angel, the brother of Jesus, a missing drug dealer and Nicholas, the scion of a powerful investment firm.

== Cast ==
- Columbus Short as August
- Wilmer Valderrama as Angel
- Alicja Bachleda as Signe
- Jesse Spencer as Nicholas
- Paz de la Huerta as Maria
- Míriam Colón as Grandma
- Mike Starr as Fixer
- Tom Pelphrey as Eric
- Kareem Savinon as Jesus
- Wass Stevens as Freddy
- J. Bernard Calloway as Dre
- Omer Barnea as Amir
- Jamie Miller as Young Signe

== Reception ==
On the review aggregator website Rotten Tomatoes, 61% of 19 critics' reviews are positive, with an average rating of 5.7/10. Metacritic, which uses a weighted average, assigned the film a score of 55 out of 100, based on nine critics, indicating "mixed or average" reviews.
