= Letters to a Young Brother =

2006 book by Hill Harper

Letters To A Young Brother
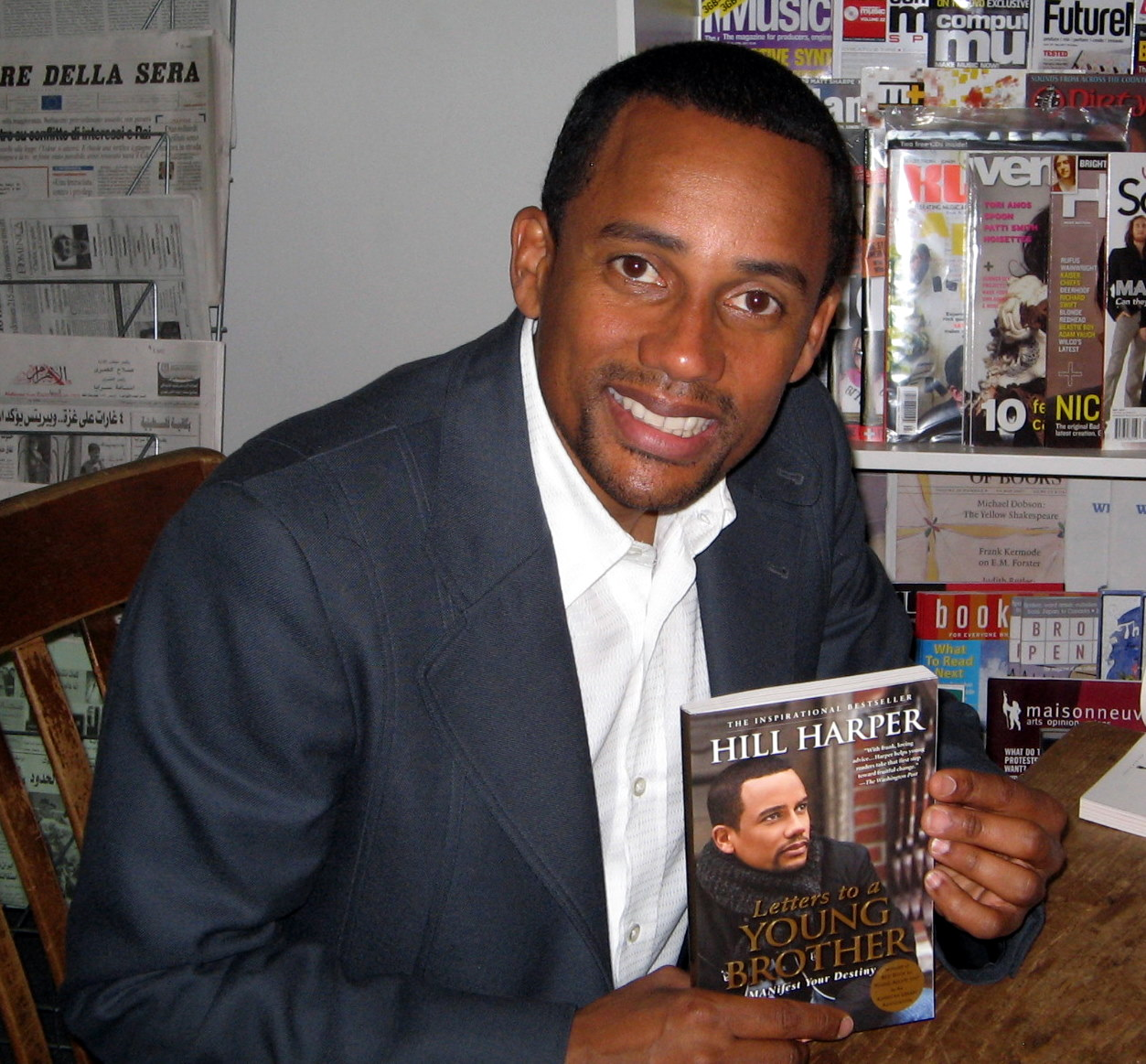
- Harper signing copies of his book Letters to a Young Brother
- Author: Hill Harper
- Language: English
- Subject: Motivational
- Publisher: Gotham
- Publication date: April 20, 2006
- Media type: Hardcover
- Pages: 192
- ISBN: 978-1-59240-200-7
- OCLC: 63692612
- Dewey Decimal: 170.84/21 22
- LC Class: BJ1671 .H35 2006

Letters to a Young Brother is a book written by actor Hill Harper, published April 2006.

Harper wrote the book to help young black males get through life and not make the same mistakes he made at a certain age. The book was inspired by Ranier Maria Rilke's Letters to a Young Poet.
