= Blood Night: The Legend of Mary Hatchet =

2009 American film directed by Frank Sabatella

- Theatrical release poster
- Directed by: Frank Sabatella
- Written by: Frank Sabatella
- Screenplay by: Elke Blasi
- Produced by: Frank Mosca; Frank Sabatella
- Starring: Bill Moseley; Nate Dushku; Danielle Harris
- Cinematography: Jarin Blaschke; Christopher Walters
- Edited by: Stephen Franciosa Jr.
- Music by: Victor Bruno; Stephen Tubin
- Production companies: Chaos Squared; Harrington Talents; Sideshow Pictures
- Distributed by: Aspect Film
- Release date: October 10, 2009 (Freak Show Horror Film Festival)
- Running time: 83 minutes
- Country: United states
- Language: English
- Budget: $3,000,000

Blood Night: The Legend of Mary Hatchet is a 2009 American slasher film written and directed by Frank Sabatella, and co-written by Elke Blasi. The film stars Bill Moseley, Nate Dushku, and Danielle Harris.

== Plot ==
In 1978, Mary Mattock has her first period, and due to menstrual psychosis, murders her parents with a hatchet. Deemed mentally unfit, Mary is placed in Kings Park Psychiatric Center, where she is raped and impregnated by a guard in 1989. This incident is covered up, and after being told her child was a stillbirth, Mary goes on a rampage through the hospital. The police find Mary wandering the grounds, and open fire on her after she throws the severed head of her rapist at them, ending her killing spree. "Mary Hatchet" subsequently becomes a folklore figure, with local youngsters celebrating the Mischief Night-esque "Blood Night" in her name.

In 2008, a group of teenagers prepare for their Blood Night party by holding a séance at Mary's grave at a cemetery on Sweet Hollow Road in Huntington, where they are told one of the stories relating to her by the cemetery caretaker, Gus, a former King's Park employee who claims that Mary will keep coming back to kill until she finds her child, who was buried in a shallow grave near Kings Park. The teenagers proceed to party at a house, where straggling guests are killed by an unseen murderer amidst supernatural occurrences.

The remaining teenagers flee when they uncover their friends' bodies, and run into Gus. After hearing the teenagers' story, Gus has them accompany him to the abandoned Kings Park Psychiatric Center, where they dig up the grave of Mary's baby, Gus being convinced that reuniting mother and child will appease Mary's spirit. The baby's casket is empty, so the group break into Kings Park in search of answers, and discover paperwork that reveals that Mary's child is Alissa, a missing party guest visiting from Chicago. A series of flashbacks show that Alissa killed everyone either due to being influenced by Mary, or because she is experiencing the onset of a disorder similar to her to mother's.

Alissa appears, kills Gus, and chases the others through the asylum, picking them off until only Alex and Lanie remain. Alex and Alissa fight, and after a bloody struggle, Alex strangles Alissa to death. As Lanie and a wounded Alex search for an exit, the latter is decapitated by Mary's enraged ghost, which then lunges at the screaming Lanie.

== Cast ==
- Danielle Harris as Alissa Giordano
- Bill Moseley as Gus 'Graveyard Gus'
- Nate Dushku as Alex
- Samantha Facchi as Mary 'Hatchet' Mattock
  - Patricia Raven as Young Mary Mattock
- Anthony Marks as Chris
- Billy Magnussen as Eric
- Alissa Dean as Nichole
- Maryam Basir as Jen
- Samantha Hahn as Lanie
- Michael Wartella as Gibbz
- Connor Fox as Katz
- Russel Dennis Lewis as Tim
- Rich Ceraulo as Corey
- Garett Neil Stevens as Huey
- Josh Segarra as Tyler
- Samantha Jacobs as Jessica
- Sal Rendino as Bob Mattock
- Nancy Malleo as Linda Mattock

== Release ==
Blood Night was released on DVD by Rivercoast Films District on August 3, 2010. It was later released by Ais and Import Vendor on April 26, 2011. That same year it was released by Lionsgate Home Entertainment June 14.

== Reception ==
David Walker of DVD Talk gave Blood Night a one, and wrote that it was "too slow and uninteresting for too long, with too many character who don't die quickly enough". In a review for Arrow in the Head, Andre Manseau awarded Blood Night an overall grade of three and a half out of four, claiming that while it "will be familiar to those who've watched any slasher in the past couple decades" it still possessed "all the right ingredients to make a good horror movie."

Daryl Loomis of DVD Verdict had a positive response to film, finding that while it did not do anything too groundbreaking or fresh, the gory and imaginative kills coupled with the fair level of suspense, solid setup, and acceptable performances made it "one of the better slasher films I've seen in some time". In a later review for the same website, written by Gordon Sullivan, found Blood Night to be a good (but not great) slasher, despite drawbacks like the uneven tone, and lengthy buildup to the gory mayhem. Todd Martin from HorrorNews.net commended the film's likable characters, and writing while also noting the film had its share of flaws. John Marrone from Bloody Disgusting gave the film a positive review, writing, "Blood Night – The Legend of Mary Hatchet puts a dose of steroids into the typical 1980's slasher, vamping it up with head severing kills executed to bloody, visual perfection, all while firming the story with an urban legend strengthened by Sabatella and crew, providing a firm backbone for the meat and veins to dangle from."
