= Maryam Basir =

American actress

- Born: Detroit, Michigan, U.S.
- Occupations: Actress, Model
- Years active: 2003-present

Maryam Basir is an American actress and model.

== Life and career ==
Basir was born in Detroit and raised in Ann Arbor, Michigan. Her brother is director Qasim Basir. She graduated from University of Michigan and later moved to New York City to pursue her acting and modeling career. She began appearing in small movies, such as horror films Fright Club (2006) and Blood Night: The Legend of Mary Hatchet (2009). She also made guest starring appearances on television series 30 Rock, Are We There Yet?, Empire, Chicago P.D., Law & Order: Special Victims Unit and The Chi.

Basir appeared in films Mooz-lum (2010), A Boy. A Girl. A Dream. (2018) and To Live and Die and Live (2023), all directed by her brother, Qasim Basir. In 2020, she starred in the BET romantic comedy film, Holiday Heartbreak. The following year, Basir was cast in a leading role as Lacey McCullough in the Allblk legal drama series, Lace. The second season aired in 2023. Basir also launched her line of cosmetics titled Maryam Beauty in 2023. In 2023, Basir played the lead alongside her Lace co-star Skyh Black in the romantic comedy-drama film, A Haitian Wedding for Amazon Prime Video.

== Filmography ==
=== Film ===
Year	Title	Role	Notes
2003	Blak Star	Andria	Short film
2005	Blood of a Champion	Kitty Kat	
2006	Fright Club	Nisa	
2008	The Inspiration of Barack	Tisha	Short film
2009	Blood Night: The Legend of Mary Hatchet	Jen	
2010	Us: A Love Story	African date	Short film
2010	Mooz-lum	Ayanna	
2012	Single Hills	Ruby	
2012	You're Nobody 'til Somebody Kills You	TV Host	
2018	A Boy. A Girl. A Dream.	Mary	
2021	Bet on Ben	Heidi Doss	
2023	To Live and Die and Live	Iman	
2023	A Haitian Wedding	Stephanie Duran	Executive producer
2024	Game Nite	Sierra	

=== Television ===
Year	Title	Role	Notes
2009	30 Rock	Lustful Lady	Episode: "The Ones"
2012	Are We There Yet?	Jenny	Episode: "The Secret Episode"
2015	Empire	Foxy Waitress	Episode: "The Devils Are Here"
2017	Chicago P.D.	Sienna Brody	Episode: "Don't Read the News"
2017	Detroiters	Foxy Waitress	Episode: "Sam the Man"
2020	Law & Order: Special Victims Unit	Moet	Episode: "She Paints for Vengeance"
2020	The Chi	Punkin	Episode: "Brewfurd"
2020	Holiday Heartbreak	Monica	Television film
2021—present	Lace	Lacey McCullough	Series regular
2022	BET Her Presents: The Couch	Amanda	Episode: "Thin Like Me"
2022	FBI: International	Tiyanna Lynelle	Episode: "A Proven Liar"
