= The Visit (2000 film) =

- Directed by: Jordan Walker-Pearlman
- Screenplay by: Jordan Walker-Pearlman
- Based on: The Visit by Kosmond Russell
- Produced by: Jordan Walker-Pearlman
- Starring: Obba Babatundé; Rae Dawn Chong; Marla Gibbs; Hill Harper; Phylicia Rashad; Billy Dee Williams
- Cinematography: John L. Demps Jr.
- Edited by: Alison Learned; Jordan Walker-Pearlman
- Music by: Michael Bearden; Stefán Dickerson; Ramsey Lewis; Wallace Roney; Stanley A. Smith
- Distributed by: Sony Pictures Releasing; Urbanworld Films
- Release dates: June 17, 2000 (Method Fest); December 15, 2000 (United States)
- Running time: 107 minutes
- Country: United States
- Language: English

The Visit is a 2000 American film written and directed by Jordan Walker-Pearlman, based on a play by Kosmond Russell.

== Premise ==
Alex Waters (Hill Harper), a young man dying of AIDS, is serving 25 years in prison for a rape he says he didn't commit. Alex, his family and his girlfriend try to come to an emotional resolution.

== Cast ==
- Obba Babatundé as Tony Waters
- Rae Dawn Chong as Felicia
- Marla Gibbs as Lois Waters
- Hill Harper as Alex Waters
- Phylicia Rashad as Dr. Coles
- Billy Dee Williams as Henry

== Reception ==
=== Critical response ===
On the review aggregator Rotten Tomatoes, the film holds an approval rating of 72% based on 32 reviews, with an average rating of 6.34/10. The website's critics consensus reads: "An earnest drama, The Visit gains much emotional power through its fine performances." Metacritic, which uses a weighted average, assigned the film a score of 60 out of 100, based on 16 critics, indicating "mixed or average reviews".

== Awards ==
- 2000: Independent Spirit Awards: 4 Nom., including Best First Feature
- 2000: National Board of Review: Freedom of Expression Award
- 2000: Chicago Film Festival: Nominated for Best Feature
