= Harrington Talents =

Harrington Talents is a film production company located in the City Island area of the Bronx. The company was founded by three childhood friends: Frank Mosca serves as the company's head producer, Stephen Franciosa Jr. works as the director, chief editor, and technical director, and John Morena works as a creative director and art designer.

== Projects ==
=== 2009 ===
- Archive
- Blood Night: The Legend of Mary Hatchet
- Before I Self Destruct

=== 2008 ===
- The Road
- Ibanker
- Comedy Jump Off: The Latino Explosion
- Dough Boys
- B.S.I
- Straight Outta Puerto Rico: Reggaeton's Rough Road to Glory

=== 2007 ===
- Dance on the Planet
- Comedy Jump Off: The Latino Invasion
- Super Slice
- WhiteBoyz in the Hood
- Seekers

=== 2006 ===
- Comedy Jump Off: The Latino Connection
- Even Steven
- Legends Never Die
- "T&T Today"
- "Whiteboyz in the Hood"
- The Making of 'Press Play'
- Making the Band 3

=== 2005 ===
- Life's Decisions
- Ape to Man

=== 2003 ===
- Jin: Making of a Rap Star

=== 2002 ===
- It's Gotta Start Somewhere

== Spot On ==
Spot On is a commercial production division of Harrington Talents. It was established in 2009 as the influx of demand for commercial, industrial, and viral productions rose for Harrington. Owners Frank Mosca and Stephen Franciosa Jr. felt it necessary to establish a subsidiary that solely dealt with commercial and promotional production.

=== Spot On projects ===
- Larry The Cable Guy: A Sleeve is a Terrible Thing to Waste was done for the History Channel to promote of Larry's show Only in America with Larry the Cable Guy.
- HCG Platinum with Carmen Electra was an infomercial done for the weight loss supplement.
- In 2011, Spot On worked on a public service announcement (PSA) entitled Not Acceptable done for the Spread the Word to End the Word campaign. It was a controversial treatment that advocated removing the word "retard" from use as a personal description. It shows people of many backgrounds expressing the unacceptable nature behind many derogatory words. The spot culminates with Jane Lynch and Lauren Potter of Fox Television's GLEE imploring everyone to remove the word from everyday language. It has garnered support from the Special Olympics, Best Buddies, the NAACP, the Anti Defamation League, GLAAD, and many other organizations.

== Awards and nominations ==
| Title | Award | Nominated work | Result |
|---|---|---|---|
| Staten Island Film Festival | Audience Choice Award | Doughboys | Winner |
| Kent Film Festival | Audience Choice Award | Doughboys | Winner |
| NYC Latino Film Festival | Official Selection | Life's Decisions | Winner |
| Tropfest @ Tribeca | Audience Choice Award | Super Slice | Winner |
| Hoboken Film Festival | Best TV Pilot | Super Slice | Winner |
| NYTV Festival | Official Selection | Super Slice | Winner |
| NYTV Festival | Best Non-Scripted Pilot | The Road | Winner |
| Los Angeles Independent TV Festival | Official Selection | iBanker | Winner |
| U.S.A. Film Festival | Official Selection | iBanker | Finalist |
