= The Perfect Guy (2015 film) =

- Theatrical release poster
- Directed by: David M. Rosenthal
- Screenplay by: Tyger Williams
- Story by: Alan B. McElroy; Tyger Williams
- Produced by: Nicole Rocklin; Wendy Rhoads; Darryl Taja; Tommy Oliver
- Starring: Sanaa Lathan; Michael Ealy; Morris Chestnut; Charles S. Dutton; Tess Harper; Kathryn Morris; Rutina Wesley; Holt McCallany
- Cinematography: Peter Simonite
- Edited by: Joan Sobel
- Music by: Atli Örvarsson; David Fleming
- Distributed by: Screen Gems (through Sony Pictures Releasing)
- Release dates: September 2, 2015 (Los Angeles premiere); September 11, 2015 (United States)
- Running time: 100 minutes
- Country: United States
- Language: English
- Budget: $12-18 million
- Box office: $60.3 million

The Perfect Guy is a 2015 American romantic thriller drama film directed by David M. Rosenthal, produced by Tommy Oliver and written by Alan B. McElroy and Tyger Williams and stars Sanaa Lathan, Morris Chestnut and Michael Ealy. Ealy and Lathan also served as executive producers on the film. The film centers on a single woman who falls in love with a man who harbors an obsession after she breaks up with him. The Perfect Guy was released in North America on September 11, 2015 and garnered negative reviews from critics, praising the filmmaking and performances but criticized the script for being underwritten and lacking in thriller moments. The film was a box-office success, grossing $60.3 million against its $12 million budget.

== Plot ==
Successful lobbyist Leah Vaughn breaks up with her boyfriend, Dave King, because he refuses to commit to her wishes of starting a family. Two months later, she meets Carter Duncan, a charming man who works in IT for another company. They quickly grow close and he works his way into the hearts of her friends and family. On their way home from a trip to San Francisco to meet her parents, a stranger at a gas station asks Leah about Carter's Dodge Charger. Carter viciously attacks the man, and Carter and Leah drive off when the station's owner orders them to leave. Distraught over his actions, Leah decides to break up with him that night.

Over the next several weeks, Carter stalks Leah at her job, and makes numerous phone calls, even after she changes her phone number. Unbeknownst to Leah, Carter also gets into her house with her spare key. He goes through her belongings, hacks into her computer, and abducts her cat. She finally decides to go to the police, meeting with Detective Hansen, who advises her to keep records of any further attempts Carter makes to contact her. Leah later finds a threatening note and a single red rose attached to her car and files a restraining order against Carter, causing him to lose his job.

Later, Dave contacts Leah about rekindling their relationship and Leah eagerly agrees. One night, Leah and Dave find Carter watching them at a restaurant, and Dave grimly warns him to stay away. They notify the police and, after Hansen interrogates Carter over the violation, Carter feigns innocence, stating he had no idea she was there and that Dave was aggressive towards him. Hansen lets him go.

One night, Leah's neighbor, Mrs. McCarthy, discovers Carter inside Leah's house, and he pushes her down the stairs, killing her. Carter secretly videotapes Leah and Dave as they sleep and make love and uses Leah's work email account to send the video to her co-workers and her business's clients, causing her to be suspended from her job. Carter also sabotages Dave's car, causing it to crash, and suffocates the injured Dave.

Both Leah and Hansen are certain that Carter is involved in Dave's death, though they lack the evidence necessary to incriminate him. After investigating further, Hansen learns that Carter's real name is Robert Adams, and that he changed his identity after a similar series of harassment. With the situation escalating, a concerned Hansen relays a story to Leah of a friend of his that bought a 12-gauge Remington shotgun that he loaded with two bean bag rounds and five live shells. Hansen explains that the bean bag rounds, if fired first as warning shots, would give justification for killing an intruder and implies that Leah should take such action, leading to Leah buying a shotgun.

Leah discovers Carter, with a new identity, with another woman. She frightens her off and files another restraining order against him in front of his new employers, once again getting him fired. She then manages to find his hideout, where he monitors her, as well as finding her cat. She destroys his numerous computers and leaves, daring him to come after her again.

That night, Carter breaks into Leah's home, and, after luring him to an empty room, she aims her gun at him. After managing to knock the gun out of her hand, a struggle ensues. Leah manages to recover her shotgun and, per Hansen's story, shoots Carter twice with bean bag rounds as a warning to make killing him justified, while claiming that the bean bag rounds are all that she has in the shotgun. When Carter persists in attacking, believing that Leah cannot kill him, Leah shoots him with a live shell from the shotgun; a fatally wounded and stunned Carter only has enough time to hear Leah confess that she lied about having no live shells before dying. A now-relieved Leah reports Carter to Hansen as an intruder, and the police cart his corpse out of her house.

== Cast ==
- Sanaa Lathan as Leah Vaughn
- Morris Chestnut as David "Dave" King
- Michael Ealy as Carter Duncan/Robert Adams
- Tess Harper as Mrs. McCarthy
- Charles S. Dutton as Leah's father, Roger Vaughn
- L. Scott Caldwell as Leah's mother, Evelyn Vaughn
- Kathryn Morris as Karen
- Rutina Wesley as Alicia
- Holt McCallany as Detective Hansen
- Ronnie Gene Blevins as Dalton
- Shannon Lucio as Cindy
- Michael Panes as Cooper
- John Getz as Tom Renkin

== Production ==
Principal photography for The Perfect Guy began on August 6, 2014, in Los Angeles. The film was shot mostly at night using Sony digital cameras and anamorphic lenses. Much of the shooting used available light to create a “mysterious” look because “David wanted the film to be dark,” according to the film's director of photography Peter Simonite. The Perfect Guy wrapped up its 34-day LA shoot in mid-September 2014.

== Release ==
On June 3, 2015, Screen Gems debuted the first official trailer for The Perfect Guy on USA Today′s website. The film was released in the Dolby Vision format in Dolby Cinema in North America.

The Perfect Guy grossed $57 million in the United States and Canada and over $3.2 million in other territories for a worldwide total of over $60.3 million, against a budget of $12 million. Sony opted not to screen The Perfect Guy for critics or have Thursday night previews for the film. The film opened on Friday, September 11, 2015, earning $9.9 million on its opening day. For the weekend, the film finished first at the box office grossing $25.9 million at 2,221 North American theaters. The Perfect Guy became available for purchase on DVD and Blu-ray on December 29, 2015.

== Reception ==
=== Critical response ===
On the review aggregator website Rotten Tomatoes, 19% of 43 critics' reviews are positive, with an average rating of 3.9/10. The website's consensus reads: "The Perfect Guy threatens to tip into enjoyably depraved territory, but ultimately settles for timid thriller clichés." Metacritic, which uses a weighted average, assigned the film a score of 36 out of 100, based on 13 critics, indicating "generally unfavorable" reviews. On CinemaScore, audiences gave the film an average grade of "A−" on an A+ to F scale.

Michael Rechtshaffen of the Los Angeles Times called it "a glossy, cliché-laden revenge thriller", commending Rosenthal and cinematographer Peter Simonite for displaying Los Angeles to "classic sun-kissed, noir-tinged perfection" but criticized Tyger Williams' script for not giving both Ealy and Lathan more complexity into their respective roles. Despite giving credit to the film's production efforts, James Rocchi of TheWrap saw it as "a perfect example of how lame, lazy material strands good actors," criticizing the screenplay for lacking in thrilling moments and giving its main cast clumsily written characters that deliver "lead, dead cliches of [the] dialogue", concluding that it "could have been a competent, engaging thriller, or at least a showcase for its talented leads; the tragedy comes in how firmly and solidly it takes so many actors and artists down with it." Blake Goble of Consequence of Sound called it "a perfectly blasé fall thriller" that's devoid of the trashy, camp fun found in the Jennifer Lopez-led The Boy Next Door concluding with, "Where's the mania? Where's the tension? Where's the goddamn "holy crap!" moment in The Perfect Guy? Sadly, there's nothing like that in this flawed and limited PG-13 film."

Kyle Anderson of Entertainment Weekly praised the film for getting over its "sluggish" first third to build tight, escalating moments that lead to a "satisfying white-knuckled finale" but felt it could've gone further in its given genre, concluding that, "When an erotic thriller leaves out the "erotic" part, all that's left is a perfectly adequate domestic disturbance tale that should have given in to its more base desires." Clayton Dillard of Slant Magazine found Williams' script to be "routine" but gave praise to Rosenthal's ability as a director to explore "contemporary relations between race, gender and class" throughout the film, saying he "uses convention to his advantage through an intriguing play with casting choices and surprising, bizarrely effective allusions to film history." Ben Sachs of the Chicago Reader called the film "a reasonably engaging thriller with some topical overtones", praising the three main leads for infusing their underwritten characters with charisma but felt the script didn't push further about the "fears of overreaching Internet surveillance" set against its Fatal Attraction story, saying "[T]he themes float emptily around the film—viewers are welcome to elaborate on them in their imaginations, but the filmmakers don't provide much help as to how audiences should interpret them."

=== Accolades ===
Lathan and Ealy were nominated for Outstanding Actress and Outstanding Actor in a Motion Picture at the 47th NAACP Image Awards for their work in the film, with the former winning but the latter losing to Michael B. Jordan for Creed.

== See also ==
- List of films featuring home invasions
- List of black films of the 2010s
