= G (2002 film) =

2002 film

- Promotional poster
- Directed by: Christopher Scott Cherot
- Written by: Andrew Lauren; Charles E. Drew, Jr.
- Produced by: Judd Landon; Andrew Lauren
- Starring: Richard T. Jones; Blair Underwood; Chenoa Maxwell; Andre Royo
- Cinematography: Horacio Marquínez
- Edited by: Robert M. Reitano
- Music by: Bill Conti
- Production company: Andrew Lauren Productions
- Distributed by: Aloha Releasing Inc.
- Release dates: May 10, 2002 (Tribeca Film Festival); October 28, 2005 (U.S.)
- Running time: 97 minutes
- Country: United States
- Language: English
- Box office: $3 million

G is a 2002 American drama film directed by Christopher Scott Cherot. It is a modern adaptation of the 1925 novel The Great Gatsby by F. Scott Fitzgerald.

The title character, G, played by Richard T. Jones, is a hip-hop music mogul (based on Jay Gatsby), who is looking to win back the love of his life, Sky (based on the character Daisy Buchanan from the original novel).

== Plot ==
The movie opens with a broken, seemingly injured, man walking down a sandy beach in the early morning, his fine white clothes stained with blood.

It then cuts to Tre (Andre Royo), driving to the Hamptons to visit his cousin Sky (Chenoa Maxwell), and her old money husband Chip Hightower (Blair Underwood).

Tre works for Chip's father's magazine, and is also there hoping to do a profile on rising Hip Hop star Summer G (Richard T. Jones), a newly rich, Hamptons newcomer, the community can't stop talking about.

Following a tense conversation during which it's revealed that Chip is cheating on Sky with a woman named Ladara (Marcia Wright), Tre takes his lovely cousin to a lavish party hosted by Summer G.

Once there, he is shocked to learn that Sky and Summer have not only met before, but were college sweethearts years earlier.

Summer G promises Tre an exclusive interview if he -Tre- can persuade Sky to meet with Summer privately to explain why she broke up with him.

Tre is at first, highly skeptical, but seeing how unhappy Sky is in her marriage to Chip, ultimately agrees, and is handsomely rewarded with being the only journalist Summer will give an interview to. He also gets to interview the other members of Summer G's inner circle. Most notably, Craig Lewis (Laz Alonzo), whose one sided relationship with girlfriend Nicole (Lalanya Masters) becomes highly relevant later on.

Then there's Daizy Duke (Jillian Lindsey) whose ambitious, self-centered ways lead her to seek petty, unsuccessful, revenge on Summer after he rejects her advances.

Finally, there's B. Mo Smooth (Nicoye Banks), who finds himself completely taken with the elusive, striking Shelly (Sonja Sohn) who's none other than the sister of Chip Hightower's mistress.

Shelly, perceptive, mature, and initially set up with Tre, is disgusted with Chip's controlling and abusive nature, which he displays flagrantly with her sister while keeping himself reigned in around his wife.

Sky, having intuited the affair, reluctantly agrees to meet with Summer. As the flames of their passion reignite, we see Chip coming home to an empty house.

He discovers a scrapbook full of Hip Hop magazine clippings, revealing that Sky, never truly stopped loving Summer.

Sky and Summer live briefly in the euphoria of their love. But it isn't long before Chip manipulates his highly conflicted wife, and convinces her to stay in their marriage.

He then makes a grand gesture of breaking up with Ladara, and demands that Sky do the same with Summer.

Meanwhile, Craig, sensing that the affections of the wayward Nicole are waning, seeks to dazzle her with a hot car and a stunning engagement ring, only to learn from Daizy, that she's been seen dating another man.

Heartbroken and humiliated upon having his suspicions confirmed, Craig takes advice from Summer, and decides to do something decisive about it.

He takes matters into his own hands just as Summer is throwing one last lavish party to announce that he is leaving the Hip Hop world to devote himself entirely to the woman he loves.

Sky and Chip arrive at Summer's party moments after Summer's announcement that he's giving it all up for Sky.

Sky tells Summer that she's ending their relationship. Summer struggles to keep his emotions under control having previously promised to do so.

Chip, having recruited head of the Homeowner's Association Adam Gordon (Andrew Lauren) in the hopes of getting Summer kicked out of the Hamptons, does his best to be an agent provocateur.

At that moment, an armed and enraged Craig Lewis shows up at the party. He quickly picks out Nicole, aims the gun at her, and pulls the trigger. Only for it to be revealed moments later, that he's accidentally shot Sky instead.

As Sky lay dying, Summer gives a final farewell. It then cuts to the opening scene, where the broken man walking down the beach is revealed to be Summer.

Everyone is in attendance at Sky's funeral.

B Mo. Smooth and Shelly are in a relationship. Daizy, her career in top form, is singing in Sky's honor.

Tre, noticing Summer's limo outside the church, goes over, and exchanges a few final words with him, before Summer drives away.

== Cast ==
- Richard T. Jones as Summer G (Jay Gatsby): a rising hip-hop star who's newly rich, and hopelessly in love with the beautiful (and married) Sky Hightower.
- Blair Underwood as Chip Hightower (Tom Buchanan): an old money elitist and ladies man. Sky Hightower's husband.
- Chenoa Maxwell as Sky Hightower (Daisy Fey Buchanan): a classy socialite. Chip Hightower's wife and Summer G's lover.
- Andre Royo as Tre (Nick Carraway): Sky's cousin and a journalist hoping to land a career writing an article profiling Summer G.
- Marcia Wright as Ladara (Myrtle Wilson): Chip Hightower's unmarried mistress whom he openly mistreats.
- Sonja Sohn as Shelly (Jordan Baker): Ladara's sister, who's initially set up with Tre, and deeply objects to Chip's toxic behavior.
- Laz Alonso as Craig Lewis: a "one hit wonder" rapper, in unrequited love with a woman.
- Lalanya Masters as Nicole Marshall: Craig's spoiled, problematic girlfriend.
- Nicoyo Banks as B. Mo Smooth: another rapper and friend of Summer G, who is attracted to Shelly.
- Jillian Lindsey as Daizy Duke: a talented and ambitious singer.
- Andrew Lauren as Adam Gordon: the head of the Homeowner's Association, who is recruited by Chip to kick out Summer G.

== Release ==
G made its worldwide premiere on May 10, 2002 at the Tribeca Film Festival in the United States. It made its theatrical premiere on October 28, 2005 in the US, more than three years from its initial premiere. Since then, it has been released on DVD in Spain, Iceland and Hungary.

== Reception ==
On the review aggregator website Rotten Tomatoes, 29% of 28 critics' reviews are positive, with an average rating of 4.7/10. The website's consensus reads: "Race and class struggles come to the Hamptons in this reworking of The Great Gatsby with a hip-hop flavor. Unfortunately, too many subplots and a lack of believable characters spoil an otherwise novel concept." Metacritic, which uses a weighted average, assigned the film a score of 42 out of 100, based on 17 critics, indicating "mixed or average" reviews.

Roger Ebert was indifferent about the film overall ("I wondered why the clarity of Fitzgerald's story line was replaced by such a jumble of a plot"), and felt that its most interesting aspects were what it had to say about race, class and money in contemporary America. Scott Foundas in Variety was more positive ("a handsome, compelling drama... that more than stands on its own"), praising the acting and particularly Jones and Maxwell as the leads.
