= Destined (film) =

- Film poster
- Directed by: Qasim Basir
- Written by: Qasim Basir
- Produced by: Codie Elaine Oliver; Tommy Oliver; Matt Ratner; Rick Rosenthal
- Starring: Cory Hardrict; Hill Harper; La La Anthony; Jesse Metcalfe
- Cinematography: Carmen Cabana
- Edited by: René Besson
- Music by: John Jennings Boyd
- Production companies: Confluential Films; Lola's Productions; Tilted Windmill Productions; Whitewater Films
- Distributed by: Alameda Entertainment
- Release dates: October 22, 2016 (Chicago); November 17, 2017
- Running time: 95 minutes
- Country: United States
- Language: English

Destined is a 2016 American fantasy drama film written and directed by Qasim Basir and starring Cory Hardrict, Hill Harper, La La Anthony and Jesse Metcalfe.

== Cast ==
- Cory Hardrict as Sheed / Rasheed
- Jesse Metcalfe as Officer Holder / Dylan Holder
- Robert Christopher Riley as Cal / Calvin
- Margot Bingham as Maya
- La La Anthony as Jada
- Hill Harper as Mayor Jones
- Jason Dohring as Nathan Miller / Officer Miller
- Zulay Henao as Giselle Porter
- Curtiss Cook as Mr. Davis

== Production ==
The film was shot in Detroit. According to the Detroit Free Press, the idea for the film was inspired by the 1998 film Sliding Doors.

While promoting the film in an interview with The Hollywood Reporter, Hardrict said, "When I read the script, it felt scary, and if something scares me on the page, I have to do it."

== Reception ==
The film has a 33% rating on Rotten Tomatoes.

== Awards ==
Basir and Hardrict won the Best Director and Best Actor awards respectively at the 2016 American Black Film Festival.
