= Robert C. Profusek =

American filmmaker and producer

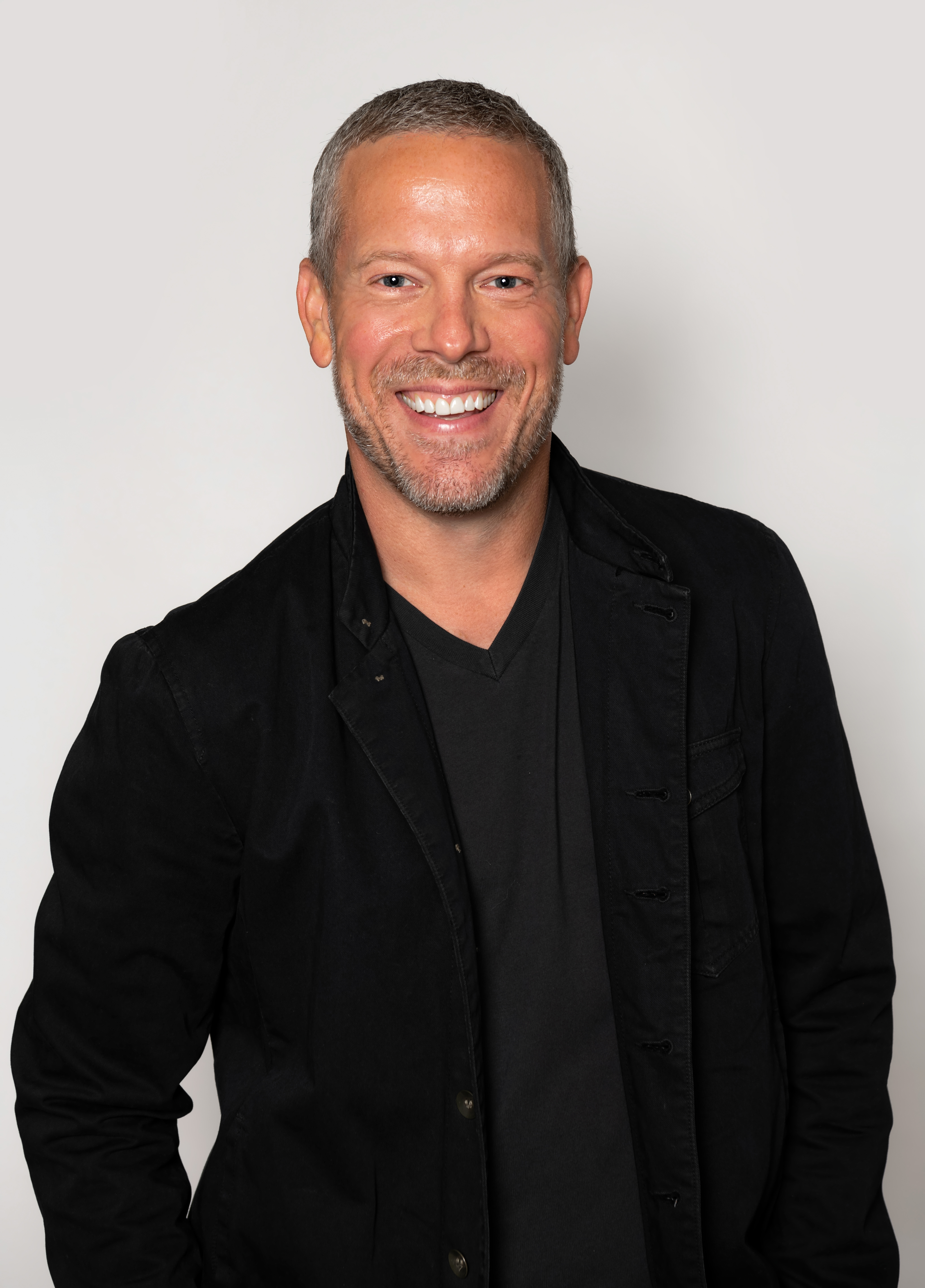
Robert C. Profusek (2022)

Robert C. Profusek (born January 7, 1980) is an Emmy-nominated American filmmaker, producer, entertainment executive, and entrepreneur, best known for Kusama: Infinity (2018), The Girl Is in Trouble (2015) and Holy Rollers (2010).

Profusek is founder and executive producer of Digital Harvest Media, a development and execution stage media and entertainment incubator that has projects in various states of production and release including Born Free (2023), Queen of New York (2023), the live-action short film Ted & Noel (2023), as well as Without a Doubt (in production), 8X10 (post-production) and Ketchup & Watermelon (post-production).

== Early life and education ==
Robert C. Profusek was born January 7, 1980, in Cleveland, Ohio to Linda and Robert A. Profusek, an attorney partner with the law practice of Jones Day. He attended Brunswick School in Greenwich, Connecticut that included a semester abroad at Oxford Sixth Form College. Profusek earned a Bachelor of Arts with Distinction in Political Science and Government from Cornell University and an MBA from Columbia Business School.

== Career ==
Profusek began his career as an investment banker with Lazard Ltd (formerly known as Lazard Frères & Co.) before transitioning to combine financial and business experience to the entertainment and media industry, initially joining independent production company Kaleidoscope Productions as an Associate to Production and Emerging Pictures in coverage. In 2006, Profusek joined Lee Daniels Entertainment as an Associate Producer to work on the feature film Tennessee.

In 2007, Profusek founded Toy Closet Films, an independent production company, where he oversaw production of feature films, television pilots, web-series, shorts and mobile apps, shepherding over 100 branded collaborations spanning all categories of media. Toy Closet content was recognized with awards and nominations including The Academy of Motion Picture Arts and Sciences (AMPAS), Sundance Film Festival, the Berlin International Film Festival (Berlinale), the Museum of Modern Art/MoMA, SXSW Conference and Festivals, San Diego International Comic-Con and the Tribeca Film Festival, as part of featured distribution partnerships with distributors including HBO, Showtime, Focus Features, Magnolia Pictures, Amazon Studios, Netflix and iTunes.

From 2011 to 2012, Profusek served as a programming consultant at YouTube, an executive producer at Condé Nast Publishing where for six years he had oversight of content strategy, live streaming, and business development for GQ, Bon Appétit, Epicurious, Condé Nast Traveler, The New Yorker, Style.com and WWD.

Prior to the merger and subsequent reverse IPO, starting in 2019, Profusek served as General Manager and Chief Creative Officer of Bellrock Brands, a family of state-legal cannabis goods. The same year, he expanded on his start-up Digital Harvest Capital to include Digital Harvest Media as he pivoted to more active non-profit and investment work.

Profusek's professional memberships include the National Academy of Television Arts and Sciences (NATAS), the Producers Guild of America (PGA) and Video Consortium, the global nonprofit media organization that connects and supports nonfiction filmmakers and visual journalists.

== Public activities ==
Profusek is actively involved with multiple philanthropic organizations including being on the board of The Mother Lovers, a non-profitraising awareness about maternal health in the United States, and as the Chairman/President of the Shelter Island Food Pantry.

== Personal life ==
In June 2013, Profusek married noted New York physician and scientist Thomas Urban Marron and resides in New York City and Shelter Island, NY.

== Awards ==
Year	Title	Award	Result	Ref.
2010	Holy Rollers	Deauville Film Festival	Winner Cartier Revelation Prize	
2010	Holy Rollers	Sundance Film Festival	Nominee - Grand Jury Prize	
2010	Down in No 5	Student Academy Awards	Narrative Nominee	
2012	Big Man	Dubai International Film Festival	Muhr AsiaAfrica Award – nominee	
2012	Bastards of Young	IFP/Woodstock Film Festival	Nominee	
2013	Without Shepherds	Slamdance Film Festival	Nominee	
2013	Some Velvet Morning	Tribeca Film Festival	Nominee	
2013	Birders Guide to Everything	Tribeca Film Festival	Nominee	
2014	Strictly Ballet	Webby Awards	Nominee	
2014	Strictly Ballet	Telly Awards	Bronze Winner	
2014	Strictly Ballet	New York Film Festival	Nominee	
2014	Strictly Ballet	Streamy Awards	Nominee	
2015	Global Threads	Telly Awards	Bronze Winner (Online Video-Documentary)	
2016	Gentlemen Lobsters	Webby Awards	Winner, Nominee Weird	
2018	Angelique	Emmy Awards	Nominee, Outstanding Feature in a News Magazine	
2018	Charlottesville: Race and Terror/VICE News Tonight	Emmy Awards	Winner, Best Story in a Newscast	
2023	Ted and Noel	Iris Film Festival	Winner, Audience Prize	

== Filmography ==
Year	Title	Position	Notes
2007	Szmolinsky	Executive Producer	Short
2008	The Boundary	Producer	Short
2008	Push Button House	Producer	Short
2008	Saveta's Gift	Producer	Short
2008	Tennessee	Producers's Assistant	Feature
2009	Cuts	Producer	Short
2009	Down in Number 5	Co-Producer	Short
2010	Holy Rollers	Co-Producer	Feature
2010	Porcelain and Diamonds	Producer	Short
2010	Last Glimmer of Day	Executive Producer	Short
2011	Wwjd	Associate Producer	Short
2011	Salaam Dunk	Distribution Executive (uncredited)	Feature
2012	Big Man	Producer	Short
2013	A Birder's Guide to Everything	Executive Producer	Feature
2013	Some Velvet Morning	Executive Producer	Feature
2013	Without Shepherds	Producer	Feature
2013	Bastards of Young	Producer	Feature
2015	The Girl Is in Trouble	Producer	Feature
2015	Magic City	Consulting Producer (uncredited)	Short
2017	Angelique	Executive Producer	Short
2018	Kusama: Infinity	Co-Producer	Feature
2023	Without A Doubt	Producer	Feature
2023	8 x 10	Executive Producer	Short
2023	Born Free	Producer	Feature
2023	Queen of New York	Producer	Feature
2023	Ted & Noel	Producer	Short
2024	Ketchup & Watermelon	Producer	Feature (Post Production)

=== TV ===
Year	Title	Position	Notes
2013	The 3 Bits	Producer	TV Series,4 episodes
2013	Back to School	supervising producer	TV Mini Series, 19 episodes
2013	Front Row Unfiltered	supervising producer	TV Mini Series, 16 episodes
2013	24 Hours in Young Hollywood	supervising producer	TV Mini Series, 4 episodes
2013	Fashion at Work	supervising producer	TV Series, 12 episodes
2013	Alex Trow in Twenty Five	producer	TV Series, 4 episodes
2013–2014	My Room Makeover	supervising producer	TV Mini Series, 21 episodes
2014	Global Threads	supervising producer	TV Mini Series, 4 episodes
2014	My Prom Makeover	supervising producer	TV Mini Series, 7 episodes
2013–2014	Teen Vogue 3 Steps To	supervising producer	TV Mini Series, 29 episodes
2014	Letter from the Editors	supervising producer	TV Mini Series, 6 episodes
2014	Beauty Icons	supervising producer	TV Mini Series, 15 episodes
2014	Get the Look	executive producer, supervising producer	TV Series, 13 episodes
2014	Teen Vogue Beauty Crisis	executive producer	TV Mini Series, 10 episodes
2014	Young Hollywood	executive producer	TV Mini Series, 1 episode
2014	The Scene We the Economy	distribution executive	TV Mini Series, 15 episodes
2014	The New Yorker Festival	executive producer	TV Mini Series, 29 episodes
2014	In the Mood For...	supervising producer	TV Mini Series, 12 episodes
2013–2014	Outfit of the Day	executive producer, supervising producer	TV Series, 59 episodes
2013–2014	Breakfast with Bevan	supervising producer, executive producer	TV Series, 35 episodes
2014–2015	Bryan Boy Goes to College	executive producer	TV Mini Series, 10 episodes
2013–2015	Throwback Thursdays with Tim Blanks	producer, supervising producer, executive producer (early first season)	TV Series, 67 episodes
2015	Influencer Journeys	executive producer	TV Mini Series, 3 episodes
2014–2015	Teen Vogue All Access	executive producer, producer	TV Mini Series, 19 episodes
2015	Condé Nast Traveler Wanderlist	executive producer	TV Mini Series, 3 episodes
2013–2015	I Am Eco Warrior	producer	TV Series, 28 episodes
2015	Sweet Spots	executive producer	TV Mini Series,19 episodes
2015	Most Amazing Cakes	executive producer	TV Mini Series, 7 episodes
2015	College Fashionista	executive producer	TV Mini Series, 2 episodes
2014–2015	Headliners	executive producer	TV Mini Series, 18 episodes
2015	Fan Gifts	executive producer	TV Mini Series, 2 episodes
2014–2015	Strictly Ballet	executive producer, supervising producer	TV Series, 37 episodes
2015	Shea Marie Instagram How-Tos	executive producer	TV Mini Series, 2 episodes
2015	Lizzie's Film, Everyone's Story	executive producer	TV Mini Series, 2 episodes
2015	Kandee Now	executive producer	TV Series, 4 episodes
2015	Bon Appétit Doggie Bag	executive producer	TV Mini Series, 2 episodes
2015	Salaam Dunk	distribution executive, executive producer	TV Mini Series 7 episodes
2015	Bon Appétit Into the Wild with Tyler MacNiven	executive producer	TV Mini Series, 2 episodes
2013–2015	Besties supervising	producer, executive producer	TV Series, 39 episodes
2015	Sneakerheadz	distribution executive	TV Mini Series, 13 episodes
2015	Bon Appétit Weed Baking	executive producer	TV Mini Series, 2 episodes
2015	Bon Appétit Thanksgiving Chef Hacks	executive producer	TV Mini Series, 4 episodes
2015	Cookie Swap: Bon Appétit	executive producer	TV Mini Series 7 episodes
2015	Inside GQ's Man of the Year	executive producer	TV Mini Series 3 episodes
2015	Bon Appétit Holiday Cocktail Hacks	executive producer	TV Mini Series, 3 episodes
2015	GQ No Shave November	executive producer	TV Mini Series, 3 episodes
2015	Teen Vogue YouTube Host: Claudia Sulewski	executive producer	TV Mini Series, 30 episodes
2015	GQ Where's the Bar	executive producer	TV Series, 13 episodes
2015–2016	GQ Women React	executive producer	TV Mini Series, 4 episodes
2014–2016	Teen Vogue's the Cover supervising	Producer, executive producer	TV Series, 44 episodes
2015–2016	Bon Appétit Ingredients	executive producer	TV Mini Series, 3 episodes
2016	GQ Getting High and Getting Ready	executive producer	TV Mini Series, 2 episodes
2015–2016	Kitchen Lab	executive producer	TV Series, 26 episodes
2016	GQ: Fashion First Looks	executive producer	TV Mini Series, 4 episodes
2016	Bon Appétit: Sara & Sarah Protip	executive producer	TV Mini Series, 2 episodes
2016	Kids Try	executive producer	TV Series, 1 episode
2016	GQ: At Home Workouts	executive producer	TV Mini Series, 4 episodes
2015–2016	Bon Appétit: 24 Hours In	executive producer	TV Mini Series, 3 episodes
2016	No Filter	executive producer	TV Mini Series, 1 episode
2016	GQ: The Grind	executive producer	TV Mini Series, 5 episodes
2015–2016	Epicurious: Cooking Magic	executive producer	TV Mini Series, 5 episodes
2015–2016	Bon Appétit: Cook Like a Pro	executive producer	TV Series, 26 episodes
2015–2016	Epicurious: 3 Steps To	executive producer	TV Mini Series, 36 episodes
2016	Bon Appetit Influencer Journeys	executive producer	TV Mini Series,2 episodes
2015–2016	GQ Style	executive producer	TV Mini Series,18 episodes
2016	GQ: Most Expensivest Shit	executive producer	TV Series, 17 episodes
2015–2016	Eat.Stay.Love: Conde Nast Traveler	executive producer	TV Mini Series, 10 episodes
2015–2016	Eat.Stay.Love: Bon Appétit	executive producer, producer	TV Series, 11 episodes
2015–2016	Epicurious: Secret History Of	executive producer	TV Mini Series, 4 episodes
2016	Vanity Fair: The New Establishment	executive producer	TV Special
2016	Glamour Women of the Year	executive producer	TV Special
2015–2016	GQ Vince Staples	executive producer	TV Mini Series, 8 episodes
2016–2017	Bong Appétit	development executive	TV Series, 30 episodes
2013	The 3 Bits	producer	TV Series,4 episodes
2013	Back to School	supervising producer	TV Mini Series, 19 episodes
2013	Front Row Unfiltered	supervising producer	TV Mini Series, 16 episodes
2013	24 Hours in Young Hollywood	supervising producer	TV Mini Series, 4 episodes
2013	Fashion at Work	supervising producer	TV Series, 12 episodes
2013	Alex Trow in Twenty Five	producer	TV Series, 4 episodes
2013–2014	My Room Makeover	supervising producer	TV Mini Series, 21 episodes
2014	Global Threads	supervising producer	TV Mini Series, 4 episodes
2014	My Prom Makeover	supervising producer	TV Mini Series, 7 episodes
2013–2014	Teen Vogue 3 Steps To	supervising producer	TV Mini Series, 29 episodes
2014	Letter from the Editors	supervising producer	TV Mini Series, 6 episodes
2014	Beauty Icons	supervising producer	TV Mini Series, 15 episodes
2014	Get the Look	executive producer, supervising producer	TV Series, 13 episodes
2014	Teen Vogue Beauty Crisis	executive producer	TV Mini Series, 10 episodes
2014	Young Hollywood	executive producer	TV Mini Series, 1 episode
2014	The Scene We the Economy	distribution executive	TV Mini Series, 15 episodes
2014	The New Yorker Festival	executive producer	TV Mini Series, 29 episodes
2014	In the Mood For...	supervising producer	TV Mini Series, 12 episodes
2013–2014	Outfit of the Day	executive producer, supervising producer	TV Series, 59 episodes
