= Codie Elaine Oliver =

American film producer

Codie Elaine Oliver is an American producer of television and film. She is known for directing Black Love, which she co-created with her husband, Tommy Oliver.

== Select works ==
- 1982 (2013; executive producer)
- Destined (2016; producer)
- Black Love (2017–2022; co-creator, director and executive producer)
- Young. Wild. Free. (2023; executive producer)
- The Perfect Find (2023; producer)
