= A Boy. A Girl. A Dream. =

2018 film by Qasim Basir

- Directed by: Qasim Basir
- Written by: Qasim Basir; Samantha Tanner
- Produced by: Datari Turner
- Starring: Omari Hardwick; Meagan Good
- Distributed by: Samuel Goldwyn Films
- Release dates: January 22, 2018 (Sundance Film Festival); September 14, 2018
- Running time: 89 minutes
- Country: United States
- Language: English

A Boy. A Girl. A Dream. is a 2018 American romantic drama film directed by Qasim Basir, who wrote the screenplay with Samantha Tanner. The film stars Omari Hardwick and Meagan Good.

== Synopsis ==
On the night of the 2016 Presidential election, Cass, an L.A. club promoter, takes a thrilling and emotional journey with Frida, a Midwestern visitor. She challenges him to revisit his broken dreams—while he pushes her to discover hers.

== Cast ==
- Omari Hardwick as Cass
- Meagan Good as "Free"
- Jay Ellis
- Dijon Talton as Naqeeb
- Wesley Jonathan as Himself
- Affion Crockett as Himself
- Maryam Basir as Mary

== Critical reception ==
The review aggregator website Rotten Tomatoes assigned the film an approval rating of 86%, based on 14 reviews assessed as positive or negative; the average rating among the reviews is 7.3/10. The similar website Metacritic surveyed 5 critics and assessed 3 reviews as positive and 2 as mixed. It gave a weighted average score of 65 out of 100, which it said indicated "generally favorable" reviews.

== See also ==
- List of black films of the 2010s
