= Hav Plenty =

1997 American romantic comedy film directed by Christopher Scott Cherot

- Directed by: Christopher Scott Cherot
- Written by: Christopher Scott Cherot
- Produced by: Bridget D. Davis; Christopher Scott Cherot; Dana Offenbach; Kenneth "Babyface" Edmonds; Robyn M. Greene; S.J. Cherot; Tracey Edmonds
- Starring: Christopher Scott Cherot; Chenoa Maxwell; Hill Harper; Tammi Katherine Jones; Robinne Lee; Reginald James
- Narrated by: Christopher Scott Cherot
- Cinematography: Kerwin DeVonish
- Edited by: Christopher Scott Cherot
- Music by: Lisa Coleman; Wendy Melvoin
- Distributed by: Miramax Films
- Release dates: September 11, 1997 (Toronto International Film Festival); June 19, 1998 (United States)
- Running time: 92 minutes
- Country: United States
- Language: English
- Budget: $65,000
- Box office: $2,284,034

Hav Plenty is a 1997 American romantic comedy film released by Miramax Films, based on an eventful weekend in the life of Lee Plenty (Christopher Scott Cherot), written and directed by Cherot. The film is based on the true story of Chris Cherot's unrequited romance with Def Jam A&R executive Drew Dixon.

== Plot ==
Lee Plenty is a flailing, wannabe writer, homeless and apartment-sitting for his friend, the wealthy Havilland Savage while she is off visiting family. Lee jumps at the chance to see Havilland, whom he has secretly loved for years, when he's invited to her New Year's Eve party. But the night leads to romantic complications that also involve Hav's recording-artist boyfriend, Michael Simmons, her best friend, Caroline, and her married sister, Leigh.

== Cast ==
- Christopher Scott Cherot as Lee Plenty
- Betty Vaughn as Grandma Moore
- Chenoa Maxwell as Havilland Savage
- Chuck Baron as Mr. Savage
- Hill Harper as Michael Simmons
- Kim Harris as Bobby Montgomery
- Margie St. Juste as Alexandria Beaumont
- Reginald James as Felix Darling
- Robinne Lee as Leigh Darling (née Savage)
- Tammi Katherine Jones as Caroline Gooden
- Paula Gene Reese as Evelyn

Cameo appearances by:

- Kenneth "Babyface" Edmonds as Lloyd Banks
- Lauryn Hill as Debra (Tru Love version of Caroline)
- Mekhi Phifer as Harold (Tru Love version of Felix)
- Nia Long as Trudy (Tru Love version of Havilland)
- Rozonda "Chilli" Thomas as Kris (Tru Love version of Leigh)
- Shemar Moore as Chris (Tru Love version of Lee)
- Tracey Edmonds as Amy Madison
- Leslie Segar as Jane (Tru Love version of Evelyn)

== Production ==
Financing for the film came from Cherot's time as a New York City cab driver, and a third mortgage on his mother's home. Principal photography took eighteen days in and around New York City and New Jersey.

Upon completion of principal photography, Cherot was out of money again, and it took him almost a year to complete his edit and make a screening print of the film. In May 1997, at his first "cast-and-crew screening" in a small screening room in New York City, Hav Plenty producer Robyn M. Greene ran into Warrington Hudlin and Bill Duke by chance in the lobby of the building and invited them up to view the film. Immediately after the screening, Hudlin invited Cherot to participate in the inaugural year of the Acapulco Black Film Festival (now the American Black Film Festival). Cherot accepted on the spot, and one month later, in June 1997, Hav Plenty was the opening night film in Acapulco, the first film at the inaugural festival.

After seeing Hav Plenty at the Acapulco Black Film Festival, Tracey Edmonds and Kenneth "Babyface" Edmonds offered to attach their names to the film and record a new soundtrack, consequently attracting an intense amount of media attention to what was previously a small, obscure independent movie. Three months later, after a screening at the Toronto International Film Festival in September 1997, Harvey Weinstein offered to buy Hav Plenty for an amount between $1.5 – $2.3 million. The amount of time that passed between Cherot's first obscure screening in New York City to Weinstein's multimillion-dollar handshake-deal in Toronto was four months.

According to an interview with Chris Cherot, Miramax wanted to give the movie a happier ending. They compromised by adding the "one year later" scene which shows a happier ending, but also leaves room for argument that Hav and Lee didn't end up together.

After screenings at the Sundance Film Festival in January 1998 to start the official "buzz", Miramax theatrically released Hav Plenty in the United States on June 19, 1998, with distribution expanding nationwide.

After being out of print for a number of years, in 2025, Hav Plenty was re-released for streaming under Samuel Goldwyn Films.

== Critical reception ==
On the review aggregator website Rotten Tomatoes, 38% of 21 critics' reviews are positive.

Stephen Holden (The New York Times) said, "With his self-deflating cool and amused insight into the shallowness of the buppie world in which he drifts, Lee is one of the most original and likable characters to pop up in a movie in quite a while." Emanuel Levy (Variety) said, "Christopher Scott Cherot makes a splashy debut as writer, director, editor and star of this fresh, bittersweet, modern-day love story that recalls the early work of Woody Allen." Duane Byrge of The Hollywood Reporter wrote, "Screenwriter-director Cherot has dished up a dicey, romantic riposte, stuffing it with the real makings of romantic comedy: individual insecurities, desires and fears." Lisa Schwarzbaum (Entertainment Weekly) wrote: "[Cherot] may be new to the movie game, but he announces himself with such confidence and force of personality, you know a noteworthy talent has arrived." Kevin Thomas at The Los Angeles Times observed, "The pleasure in watching Hav Plenty comes from seeing Cherot discover the possibilities of the medium as he goes along... As it unfolds, repartee gives way to an increasing sense of the visual, and by the time the film is over, Cherot has discovered how potent [his actors] can be in repose." The San Francisco Chronicle remarked, "Hav Plenty harks back to a different temperament with considerable charm." Entertainment Weekly included Cherot on its year-end "It-List".

Roger Ebert was more critical, calling the film "basically an amateur movie, with some of the good things and many of the bad that go along with first-time efforts".

== Awards and nominations ==
1997 Acapulco Black Film Festival

- Best of Festival – Christopher Scott Cherot (winner)

1998 Sundance Film Festival

- Grand Jury Prize, Dramatic – Christopher Scott Cherot (nominated)

1999 Acapulco Black Film Festival

- Best Screenplay – Christopher Scott Cherot (winner)

== Soundtrack ==
A soundtrack containing hip hop and R&B music was released on June 9, 1998 by Sony Music Entertainment. It peaked at No. 39 on the Billboard 200 and No. 6 on the Top R&B/Hip-Hop Albums.
