= Christopher Scott Cherot =

American film director

- Born: The Bronx, New York, U.S
- Education: New York University,'93 BFA Film and Television
- Occupations: Actor, director, writer
- Years active: 1997–present

Christopher Scott Cherot is an American actor, writer and director, best known for his debut romantic comedy film, Hav Plenty (1997), a true story that he wrote, edited, produced, acted in and directed. For his debut film, Cherot won Acapulco Black Film Festival Awards for Best Screenplay and Best of Festival, and received nomination at the 1998 Sundance Film Festival.

Cherot also directed G, loosely based on The Great Gatsby, as well as The Male Groupie (2004), Andre Royo's Big Scene (2004), and the BET reality series College Hill (2004), an urban version of MTV's The Real World, and edited the first season of LOGO's Noah's Arc (2006). Additional credits include Mooz-lum (2010), Black Love (2017–2022), and the Emmy-nominated Noah's Arc: The Movie (2025).
