= Omari Hardwick =

American actor (born 1974)

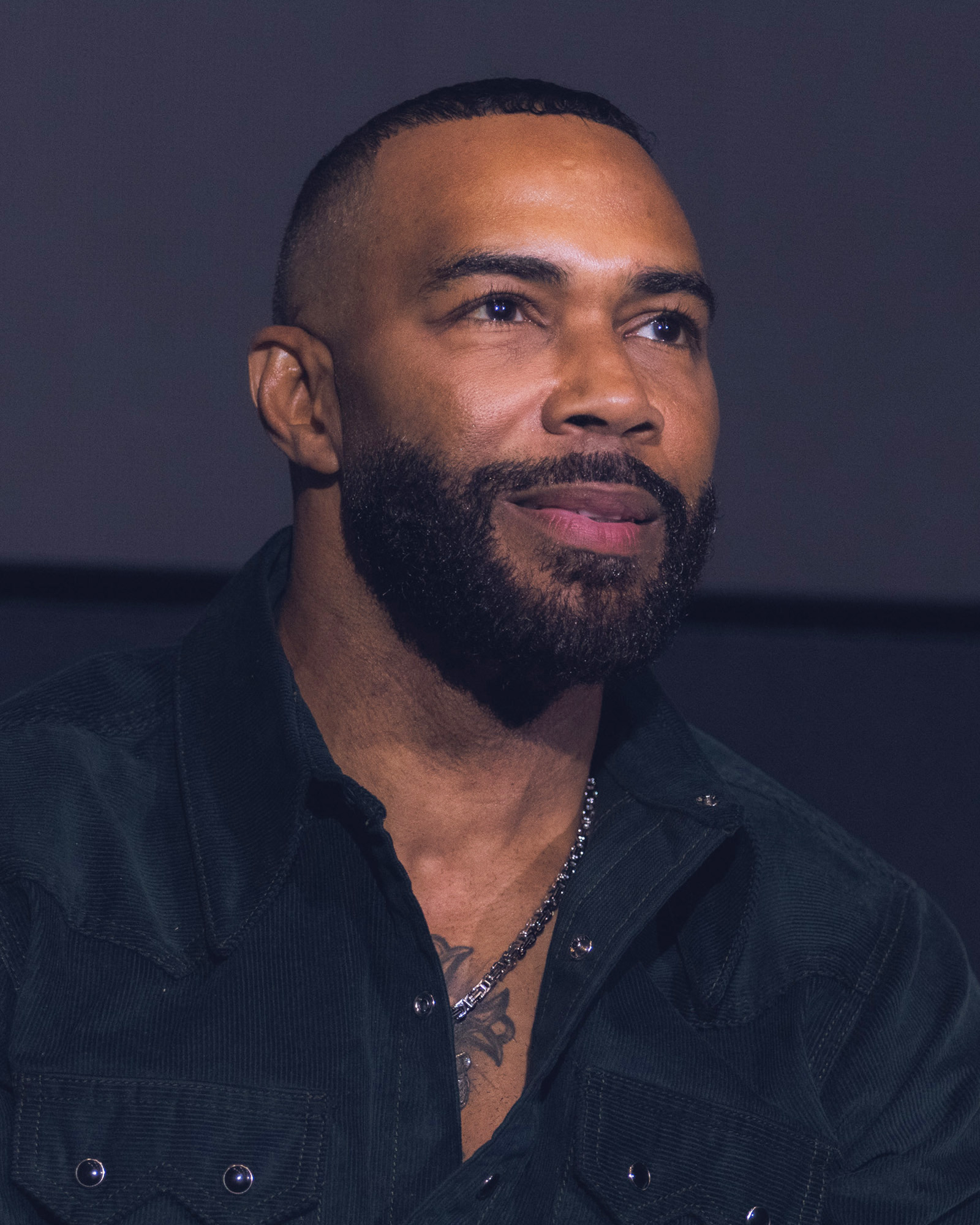
- Hardwick in 2025
- Born: Omari Latif Hardwick; January 9, 1974 (age 52); Decatur, Georgia, U.S.
- Education: Furman University
- Occupations: Actor; model; singer; songwriter; rapper
- Years active: 2001–present
- Spouse: Jennifer Pfautch (m. 2012)
- Children: 2

Omari Latif Hardwick (born January 9, 1974) is an American actor. He is known for his starring role as James St. Patrick/Ghost, the protagonist of Starz's Power and his role as Vanderohe in Zack Snyder's Army of the Dead (2021). He is also known for his roles in Saved and Dark Blue, in Spike Lee's Miracle at St. Anna (2008), Kick-Ass (2010), Tyler Perry's For Colored Girls (2010), and as Andre in BET Network's Being Mary Jane.

Hardwick earned a 2025 Grammy Award for Best Spoken Word Poetry Album nomination for the album Concrete & Whiskey Act II Part 1: A Bourbon 30 Series. For the 2026 Grammy Awards, he got a nomination for his album Pages for the Best Spoken Word Poetry Album.

== Early life and education ==
Hardwick was born in Savannah, Georgia, the son of Joyce and Clifford Hardwick III, an attorney. He is one of four siblings. Growing up in Decatur, Georgia, Hardwick wrote poetry on a regular basis, and participated in many sports. In high school, he attended Marist School in Brookhaven, Georgia, where he played baseball, basketball and football. He later enrolled at the Furman University on a football scholarship. Hardwick continued acting and writing poetry, minoring in theater. In 1996, after transferring to the University of Georgia, he pledged and became a member of the Zeta Pi chapter of Alpha Phi Alpha fraternity.

== Career ==
After graduation, Hardwick initially pursued a career in football, hoping to join the San Diego Chargers. He declared himself for the NFL Draft, where he was not selected, and eventually returned to acting.

As a struggling actor, Hardwick did odd jobs in order to pay for acting classes and started living in his car. In 2002, Hardwick was an extra in Floetry's "Say Yes" music video. From 2003 to 2004, he participated in the National Poetry Slam competition, placing top 5 overall. Hardwick finally got his break in the 2004 TV movie Sucker Free City. In 2006, he booked a role in the feature film The Guardian and appeared as a series regular in the TV show Saved, which required he spend two years training as a fireman and a paramedic.

In 2010, Hardwick became a founding member of "Plan B Inc. Theater Group", and a co-founder of "Actor's Lounge" at the Los Angeles Greenway Theater. He also founded production company "Bravelife Films". Hardwick was also featured in the urban lifestyle publication, Prominence Magazine for its Holiday issue.

Hardwick reading a poem, with Congresswoman Terri Sewell looking on, at The National Memorial for Peace and Justice in Alabama in 2020.

In 2011, Hardwick received his best film reviews to date for his role as "Troy" in the critically acclaimed indie hit I Will Follow. Hardwick has guest starred on an episode of NBC's Chase as Chris Novak, a hard luck criminal facing prison.

In 2013, Hardwick was cast in the lead role of James "Ghost" St. Patrick on the Starz crime drama-thriller, Power. The series ran for six seasons.

In 2016, he was featured by South African rapper Nasty C on a song titled "A Star Is Born".

Hardwick co-starred in the science fiction comedy film Sorry to Bother You, which was released in theaters on July 6, 2018.

In July 2019, Hardwick was cast in Zack Snyder's Netflix film Army of the Dead. An animated series titled Army of the Dead: Lost Vegas commenced production but was shelved by 2023.

In January 2021, it was announced that Hardwick was cast as Gordon Oliver in Netflix's thriller series Pieces of Her, which is adapted from the Karin Slaughter novel of the same name.

In April 2022, it was announced that Hardwick would star alongside Marsai Martin and Kelly Rowland in the Paramount+ film Fantasy Football, released on November 25.

== Personal life ==
Hardwick began a relationship with Jennifer "Jae" Pfautch in the 2000s. Pfautch, who is of Native American and German descent, was disowned by her family in the aftermath for dating outside of her race. In 2008, the couple's first child was stillborn. Hardwick and Pfautch married in June 2012 and have two children, daughter Nova and son Brave. Hardwick is Catholic.

== Filmography ==
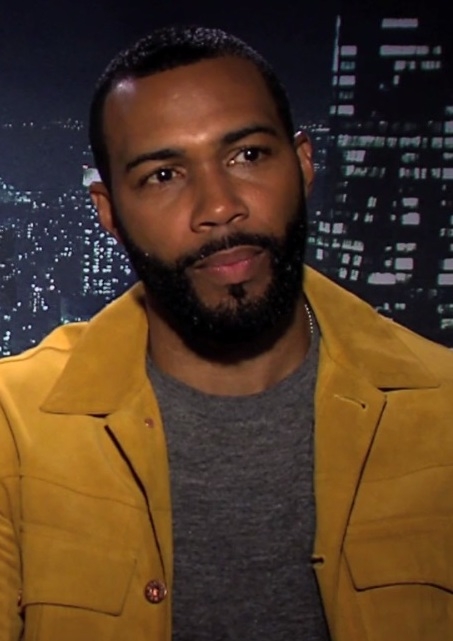
Hardwick interviewed about Power in 2015

=== Films ===
Year	Title	Role	Notes
2002	Circles	Lameck	
2004	Within the Wall	Saul	Short film
2004	The Male Groupie	'Act Shun'	Short film
2005	Beauty Shop	Byron	
2006	Speechless	Ku James	
2006	Gridiron Gang	'Free'	
2006	The Guardian	Carl Billings	
2008	Miracle at St. Anna	Platoon Commander Huggs	
2008	Linewatch	Drake / Kimo	
2009	Next Day Air	Shavoo	
2010	Everyday Black Man	Malik	
2010	Kick-Ass	Sergeant Marcus Williams	
2010	The A-Team	Jay 'Chopshop Jay'	
2010	For Colored Girls	Carl Bradmore	Nominated – Black Reel Award for Best Breakthrough Performance
2010	I Will Follow	Troy	
2012	Sparkle	Levi	
2012	Middle of Nowhere	Derek	
2013	Kings & Beggars	Noah	Short film; also writer
2013	Lu	Dr. Harden	Short film
2013	Things Never Said	Curtis Jackson	
2013	The Last Letter	Michael Wright	
2014	Reach Me	Dominic	
2014	Lap Dance	Dr. Don Cook	
2015	Chapter & Verse	Jomo	
2017	Shot Caller	Ed Kutcher, Parole Officer	
2017	The Runner	Rick Roslin	
2018	Sorry to Bother You	Mr. _______	
2018	A Boy. A Girl. A Dream.	Cass	Also executive producer
2018	Sgt. Will Gardner	Samuel 'Top' Gallegos	
2018	Nobody's Fool	Frank Johnson	
2019	American Skin	Omar Scott	
2020	Spell	Marquis	
2021	Army of the Dead	Vanderohe	
2021	The Mothership		Filmed in 2021, ultimately unreleased
2022	Fantasy Football	Bobby Coleman	
2023	To Live and Die and Live	Kevin	
2023	The Mother	William Cruise	
2023	Phels High	Principal Floyd	
2025	Star Trek: Section 31	Alok	
2025	Xeno	Jonathan Keyes	
TBA	Empire City	Hawkins	Post-production

=== Television ===
Year	Title	Role	Notes
2004	Sucker Free City	Dante Ponce	Television film
2005	Crossing Jordan	Ronald Pasco	Episode: "Judgement Day"
2006	Saved	John 'Sack' Hallon	Main cast
2008	CSI: Miami	Eddie Dashell	Episode: "And How Does That Make You Kill?"
2008	SIS	Donovan Rivers	Television film
2009–2010	Dark Blue	Ty Curtis	Main cast Nominated – NAMIC Vision Award Best Performance, Drama (2011)
2009	Lie to Me	Benny 'B' Davis	Episode: "The Better Half"
2010	Chase	Chris Novak	Episode: "Betrayed"
2012	Breakout Kings	Ronnie Markham	Episode: "Self Help"
2013–2014	Being Mary Jane	Andre Daniels	Main cast Black Reel Award for Outstanding Actor, TV Movie or Mini-Series (2014); Nominated – Image Award for Outstanding Actor in a Television Movie, Mini-Series or Dramatic Special (2014); Nominated – Image Award for Outstanding Actor in a Drama Series (2015)
2013	A Christmas Blessing	Earl James	Television film Nominated – Black Reel Award for Outstanding Actor, TV Movie or Mini-Series
2014–2020	Power	James 'Ghost' St. Patrick	Main cast Nominated – BET Award for Best Actor (2017) (seasons 1–6)
2021	That Damn Michael Che	Himself	Episode: "Sex Worker"
2022	Pieces of Her	Gordon Oliver	Main cast
2026	The Greatest	Cassius "Cash" Clay Sr.	Main cast
2027	Bosch: Start of Watch	Eli Bridges	Main cast

=== Music videos ===
Year	Title	Artist	Role
2000	"No More"	Ruff Endz	Store Clerk
2002	"Say Yes"	Floetry	Passenger
2011	"Break My Heart"	Estelle featuring Rick Ross	Love interest
2012	"You Make Me Wanna"	Eshe featuring Omari Hardwick	Love interest
2016	"A Star is Born"	Nasty C featuring Omari Hardwick	Himself (cameo)
2017	"Flipmode"	Fabolous, Velous and Chris Brown	Himself (cameo)
2017	"Family Feud"	Jay-Z featuring Beyoncé	Mr. President
2018	"First Began"	PJ Morton	Love interest

== Discography ==
=== Singles ===
Title	Year	Album
"Bloodshed" (with Josiah Bell)	2017	Non-album singles
"50+O=500" (with 50 Cent and David Rush)	2018	Non-album singles
"Some Kinda Way"	2018	Non-album singles
"hOme" (with Anthony Hamilton)	2019	Non-album singles
"Destiny" (with Marsha Ambrosius and Keyon Harrold)	2024	Non-album singles
"The Greatest" (with Tank)	2024	Non-album singles
"DMX" (with Goapele)	2024	Non-album singles
