= Doing Hard Time =

2004 drama crime film

Doing Hard Time is a 2004 crime drama film starring Boris Kodjoe, Michael K. Williams, Steven Bauer, David Banks, and Giancarlo Esposito. Michael (Boris Kodjoe) was a good man and a loving father, until one day, his seven-year-old son was caught in the crossfire of a drug deal gone bad. Michael's mourning becomes outrage when his child's killers get only a slap on the wrist for drug possession.

He launches a crusade of vengeance, getting arrested himself so that he can go behind bars and deal out his own brand of justice to the two shooters. But in a place where there are no rules, revenge will no longer be Michael's only concern.

== Plot ==
When Michael Mitchell's seven-year-old son, Chase, is accidentally shot during an aborted drug deal, no one knows for sure which of the two gunmen, Curtis "Durty Curt from Detroit" Craig or Raymond "Razor" Carver, pulled the trigger. Because both men refuse to testify against the other, a jury finds them guilty only of drug possession, meaning they could be back on the street in two years.

Having already lost Chase's mother to cancer, Michael can't live with the idea of his only child's murder going unpunished. As part of a methodical plan to exact his revenge, he commits a brutal crime to get himself sentenced to the same institution as Durty Curt and Razor. Meanwhile, Durty Curt is determined to settle the score with Razor, who has fallen in with prison kingpin Eddie Mathematic.

As a showdown approaches, a cast of players, from prison guard Capt. Pierce to gay bookie Clever to fast-talking druggy (David Banks) to Michael's illiterate cellmate, Smalls, take sides and place bets on the outcome.

== Cast ==
- Boris Kodjoe as Michael Mitchell
- Michael K. Williams as Curtis "Durty Curt from Detroit" Craig
- Sticky Fingaz as Eddie Mathematic
- David Banks as Chris
- Reagan Gomez-Preston as Rayvon Jones
- William L. Johnson as Clever
- Marcello Thedford as Toure Smalls
- Emilio Rivera as Officer David Teal
- Chenoa Maxwell as Elise
- Charles Malik Whitfield as Armand
- Patrice Fisher as Lt. Elaine Lodge
- Steven Bauer as Det. Anthony Wade
- Giancarlo Esposito as Captain Pierce
- Michael Kimbrew as Raymond "Razor" Carver
- Thomas Louis Wood as Detective #1

== Production ==
Michael Kimbrew produced Doing Hard Time.

== Reception ==
The Corpus Christi Caller-Times film critic John Powell Metz called Doing Hard Time "a commendable effort to explore complicated prison themes" though said "it could use a rewrite and the axing of a few characters". Cinema criticized the film's story, dialogue, and acting. Filmdienst thought the film "largely avoids genre clichés but fails to give the story a distinctive identity of its own".

The author David Gritten said Doing Hard Time "add[s] a few twists to the familiar clichés of the genre" but "it would have been a better movie if it had lost its sentimental coda". According to the authors Mick Martin and Marsha Porter, "Weak acting, direction, and writing work overtime to nullify any dramatic impact." The Hornsby and Upper North Shore Advocate thought that the film has a "dramatic finale" and was "a good movie but not a great movie".

== See also ==
- List of hood films
