= To Live and Die and Live =

- Theatrical release poster
- Directed by: Qasim Basir
- Written by: Qasim Basir
- Produced by: Qasim Basir; Nina Yang Bongiovi; Forest Whitaker; Amin Joseph; Samantha Basir; Dana Offenbach; Cory Hardrict; Omari Hardwick
- Starring: Amin Joseph; Skye P. Marshall; Omari Hardwick; Cory Hardrict; Maryam Basir; Dana Gourrier; Travina Springer
- Cinematography: Qasim Basir
- Edited by: Paige Alston; Qasim Basir
- Music by: Maxime Lacoste-Lebuis
- Distributed by: AuthentiQ Films; CinemaStreet Pictures
- Release dates: January 20, 2023 (Sundance); May 30, 2025 (United States)
- Running time: 105 minutes
- Country: United States
- Language: English

To Live and Die and Live is a 2023 American drama film written and directed by Qasim Basir and starring Amin Joseph.

The film premiered at the 2023 Sundance Film Festival on January 20, 2023, and was released theatrically in the United States on May 30, 2025.

== Cast ==
- Amin Joseph as Muhammad Abdullah
- Skye P. Marshall as Asia
- Omari Hardwick as Kevin
- Cory Hardrict as Akil
- Maryam Basir as Iman
- Dana Gourrier as Lisa
- Travina Springer as Raina
- Ismail Abdul-Aziz as Yusuf
- Jeryl Prescott as Ummi, Mother
- Roger Guenveur Smith as Reed Jennings

== Release ==
The film premiered at the Sundance Film Festival on January 20, 2023. In April 2025, it was announced that the film will be released exclusively in AMC Theatres in May 2025. by AuthentiQ Films and CinemaStreet, followed by a home media release later that year by Samuel Goldwyn Films. The film was released in AMC Theatres on May 30, 2025, by AuthentiQ Films and CinemaStreet Pictures.

The film opened in selected AMC Theatres in New York, Detroit, Chicago, Philadelphia, Washington, D.C., Atlanta, Dallas–Fort Worth, Baltimore, Milwaukee, New Orleans, Montgomery, and Los Angeles on May 30.

== Reception ==
The film has a 90% rating on Rotten Tomatoes based on nine reviews.

Dennis Harvey of Variety gave the film a positive review and wrote, "For all its tastefully exasperating gaps in character and storytelling specifics, To Live & Die and Live still has a persuasive overall vision..." Patrice Witherspoon of Screen Rant awarded the film four out of five stars and wrote, "In its methodical approach towards addressing mental health, To Live and Die and Live defies and exceeds emotional expectations." Todd McCarthy of Deadline Hollywood also gave the film a positive review and wrote, "Stylistically, To Live and Die and Live is cut down to the bone, with the essential action being conveyed but with a vital terseness that both frustrates and keeps you on your toes."
