= Jordan Walker-Pearlman =

American film director, screenwriter, film producer, and executive

- Born: June 24, 1967 (age 59); New York City, New York
- Occupations: Film director; screenwriter; film producer
- Years active: 1986–present
- Spouse: Elizabeth Hunter (m. 2015)
- Relatives: Gene Wilder (maternal uncle)

Jordan Walker-Pearlman (born June 24, 1967) is an American film director, screenwriter, film producer, and executive.

== Early life ==
Walker-Pearlman was born in New York City to a Russian-Jewish family. He is nephew of actor Gene Wilder with whom he lived for a period of time in childhood.

== Career ==
Walker-Pearlman is best known for the 2000 film The Visit, for which he was nominated for two Independent Spirit Awards (one for directing and one for the screenplay) and the movie itself received four nominations.

His 2005 film, Constellation, starring Gabrielle Union, Zoe Saldaña, and Billy Dee Williams, premiered at the Pan African Film Festival, Roxbury Film Festival, Black Filmmaker Magazine Film Festival, and the Chicago International Film Festival. It also had a special premiere at the Kwa Mashu Film Festival in South Africa with both director and actress Gabrielle Union present for ten days to open the movie theater at the Arts Centre in the Kwa Mashu Township.

Both films won the Audience Award at the Urbanworld Film Festival in their respective years.

== Personal life ==
In 2015, Walker-Pearlman married screenwriter Elizabeth Hunter.

On February 3, 2020, he wrote an op-ed for the Los Angeles Times calling on the Motion Picture Academy to recognize the "cultural violence" of historical racism in American movies in its new Academy Museum of Motion Pictures in Los Angeles and explained his years earlier decision to decline an invitation to membership in the organization. The op-ed was the first of several that year that appeared to influence AMPAS to dedicate several exhibits to this history.

In 2020, he purchased his late uncle Gene Wilder's house from Elon Musk using owner financing by Musk, and the property was featured in the semi-autobiographical film The Requiem Boogie. However, in August 2024, the house was in foreclosure proceedings due to the alleged difficulties making additional payments on the private note during the writers strike of 2023, with Walker-Pearlman reportedly rebuffing all offers from developers with intent to tear down the house, in addition the house is protected by a restrictive covenant conceived by Musk and the filmmaker, disallowing for its destruction, with Walker-Pearlman thus far been supportive of Musk and his handling their situation. Musk would later retake ownership of the house in June 2025.

He is the co-founder of MoJo Global Arts which he left in June 2021 to become founder of the film production company HarlemHollywood.

== Filmography ==
Year	Title	Role	Notes
1980–1984	Livewire	Himself	2 episodes
1982	Hanky Panky	Boy on Escalator	Uncredited
1982	True Innocence	The Guy	Short film
1999	Hollywood 26	Himself	1 episode
2015–2016	Unsung Hollywood	Himself	2 episodes
2017	Sex and Violence! or: A Brief Review of Simple Physics	Marty	
2018	Love, Gilda	Himself	
2024	The Requiem Boogie	Ranny Besquith	Also director and producer
