= 1982 (2013 film) =

2013 film by Tommy Oliver

- Film poster
- Directed by: Tommy Oliver
- Written by: Tommy Oliver
- Produced by: Tommy Oliver
- Starring: Hill Harper; Sharon Leal; Bokeem Woodbine; La La Anthony; Quinton Aaron; Wayne Brady; Ruby Dee
- Cinematography: Daniel Vecchione
- Edited by: Tovah Leibowitz; Tommy Oliver
- Music by: John Jennings Boyd
- Production companies: Black Squirrel Films; Confluential Films
- Distributed by: CodeBlack Entertainment; Lionsgate
- Release date: September 8, 2013 (Toronto)
- Running time: 90 minutes
- Country: United States
- Language: English

1982 is a 2013 drama film written and directed by Tommy Oliver and starring Hill Harper. It is Oliver's directorial debut. The film is also semi-autobiographical. The film marked the final appearance of actress and activist Ruby Dee before her death in 2014.

== Plot ==
The film is set in Philadelphia 1982.

== Cast ==
- Hill Harper as Tim Brown
- Sharon Leal as Shenae Brown
- Bokeem Woodbine as "Scoop"
- La La Anthony as Neecy
- Quinton Aaron as "Turtle"
- Wayne Brady as Alonzo
- Ruby Dee as Rose Brown
- Troi Zee as Maya Brown
- Chaz Dausuel as Terrence

== Release ==
The film premiered at the 2013 Toronto International Film Festival and later made its multi-platform release in March 2016.

== Reception ==
On review aggregator website Rotten Tomatoes, the film holds an approval rating of 78% based on nine reviews, and an average rating of 7/10.

Sheri Linden of The Hollywood Reporter gave the film a positive review and wrote, "Suitably low-key but sometimes under-realized, this drama is fueled by its working-class milieu and a heart-wrenching performance by Hill Harper."

== See also ==
- List of black films of the 2010s
