= Black Love (2017 TV series) =

- Genre: Reality
- Created by: Tommy Oliver; Codie Elaine Oliver
- Directed by: Codie Elaine Oliver
- Country of origin: United States
- Original language: English
- No. of seasons: 6
- No. of episodes: 41

Production
- Executive producers: Tommy Oliver; Codie Elaine Oliver
- Cinematography: Tommy Oliver
- Editor: Christopher Scott Cherot
- Camera setup: Multiple
- Running time: 42 minutes
- Production companies: Confluential Films & Black Love, Inc.

Original release
- Network: Oprah Winfrey Network
- Release: August 29, 2017 – August 27, 2022

Black Love is an American docuseries created by filmmakers Codie Elaine Oliver and Tommy Oliver, featuring couples opening up about the joys, challenges and realities of love, marriage and romance in the black community. It premiered on August 29, 2017 on the Oprah Winfrey Network as the most-viewed unscripted series debut in the network's history.

A fifth season premiered on May 14, 2021. The sixth and final season premiered on July 23, 2022.

== Episodes ==
=== Series overview ===
Season	Episodes	Originally released	
Season	Episodes	First released	Last released
1	4	August 29, 2017	September 16, 2017
2	8	May 12, 2018	October 20, 2018
3	8	August 10, 2019	November 29, 2019
4	6	September 5, 2020	October 24, 2020
5	6	May 14, 2021	June 18, 2021

=== Season 1 (2017) ===
No. overall	No. in season	Title	Original release date	U.S. viewers (millions)
1	1	"Where Love Begins"	August 29, 2017	N/A
2	2	"Tripping Over Hurdles"	September 2, 2017	N/A
3	3	"Falling Down"	September 9, 2017	N/A
4	4	"Getting to Forever"	September 16, 2017	N/A

=== Season 2 (2018) ===
No. overall	No. in season	Title	Original release date	U.S. viewers (millions)
5	1	"How Love Begins"	May 12, 2018	N/A
6	2	"Getting Down the Aisle"	May 19, 2018	N/A
7	3	"Accountability"	May 26, 2018	N/A
8	4	"Life After Baby"	June 2, 2018	N/A
9	5	"Second Time Around"	October 2, 2018	0.77
10	6	"Picking Your Battles"	October 6, 2018	0.35
11	7	"In Sickness and In Health"	October 13, 2018	0.42
12	8	"Love That Lasts"	October 20, 2018	0.30

=== Season 3 (2019) ===
No. overall	No. in season	Title	Original release date	U.S. viewers (millions)
13	1	"In the Beginning"	August 10, 2019	0.27
14	2	"Long & Windy Roads"	August 17, 2019	0.28
15	3	"Emerging from Darkness"	August 24, 2019	0.25
16	4	"Mountains & Molehills"	August 31, 2019	0.29
17	5	"Married While Parenting"	November 8, 2019	N/A
18	6	"Beneath The Surface"	November 15, 2019	N/A
19	7	"Money, Power, Respect"	November 22, 2019	N/A
20	8	"Forever And Always"	November 29, 2019	N/A

=== Season 4 (2020) ===
No. overall	No. in season	Title	Original release date	U.S. viewers (millions)
21	1	"How Love Starts"	September 5, 2020	N/A
22	2	"Newlyweds"	September 5, 2020	N/A
23	3	"Mental Illness"	September 12, 2020	N/A
24	4	"Finding a Rhythm"	October 3, 2020	N/A
25	5	"Stand By Me"	October 10, 2020	N/A
26	6	"Making It Last"	October 24, 2020	N/A
27	7	"In This Together, Part 1"	October 17, 2020	N/A
28	8	"In This Together, Part 2"	October 17, 2020	N/A

=== Season 5 (2021) ===
No. overall	No. in season	Title	Original release date	U.S. viewers (millions)
29	1	"How Love Begins"	May 14, 2021	N/A
30	2	"When Two Become One: Finances"	May 21, 2021	N/A
31	3	"First Comes Love, Then Comes..."	May 28, 2021	N/A
32	4	"Faith and Fear"	June 4, 2021	N/A
33	5	"Give and Take"	June 11, 2021	N/A
34	6	"Creating a Foundation"	June 18, 2021	N/A

== Awards and nominations ==
Year	Award	Category	Result
2018	49th NAACP Image Awards	Outstanding Documentary (Television)	Nominated
2018	49th NAACP Image Awards	Outstanding Directing in a Television Movie or Special (Codie Elaine Oliver)	Nominated
