= Mooz-lum =

- Directed by: Qasim "Q" Basir
- Written by: Qasim "Q" Basir
- Produced by: Peace Film
- Starring: Danny Glover; Nia Long; Evan Ross; Roger Guenveur Smith
- Distributed by: CodeBlack Lionsgate (US) Rising Pictures (Australia)
- Release dates: September 17, 2010 (Urbanworld Film Festival); February 11, 2011 (United States)
- Running time: 95 minutes
- Country: United States
- Language: English
- Budget: $1,200,000 (USA)
- Box office: $369,129 (USA)

Mooz-lum is a 2011 American independent film written and directed by Qasim "Q" Basir and stars Danny Glover, Nia Long, and Evan Ross. Mooz-lum (i.e. "Muslim") tells the story of an African American Muslim family whose lives are changed by the September 11 attacks and their aftermath. The film was initially promoted primarily through social media, before opening for its limited theatrical release on February 11, 2011.

== Cast ==
- Evan Ross as Tariq Mahdi
- Nia Long as Safiq
- Danny Glover as Dean Francis
- Roger Guenveur Smith as Hassan Mahdi
- Azhar Usman as Brother Hussein
- Maryam Basir as Ayanna

== Plot ==
Amid a strict Muslim rearing and a social life he has never had, Tariq Mahdi (Evan Ross) enters college confused.

New peers, family and mentors help him find his place, but the 9/11 attacks force him to face his past and make the biggest decisions of his life.

== Filming ==
The movie was filmed in Southeastern Michigan. Although the college attended by Tariq is never explicitly identified, most of the college scenes were filmed on location on the campuses of the University of Michigan and Eastern Michigan University. The mosque scene was filmed at the Islamic Center of America in Dearborn, Michigan.

== Reception ==
As of January 14, 2015, Mooz-lum has received an overall rating of 80% from all critics (8 fresh and 2 rotten) at Rotten Tomatoes. Film critic Omer Mozaffar calls the film "a long awaited breath of fresh air" at RogerEbert.com.

=== Awards and honors ===
- 14th Annual Urbanworld Film Festival 2010—Best Narrative Feature
- Chicago International Film Festival 2010—Official Selection
- 34th Cairo International Film Festival—Official Selection

== See also ==
- List of cultural references to the September 11 attacks
- List of black films of the 2010s
