= List of American films of 1998 =

This is a list of American films released in 1998.

== Box office ==
The highest-grossing American films released in 1998, by domestic box office gross revenue, are as follows:

Highest-grossing films of 1998
Rank	Title	Distributor	Domestic gross
1	Saving Private Ryan	DreamWorks Distribution	$216,540,909
2	Armageddon	Disney	$201,578,182
3	There's Something About Mary	20th Century Fox	$176,484,651
4	A Bug's Life	Disney	$162,798,565
5	The Waterboy	Disney	$161,491,646
6	Dr. Dolittle	20th Century Fox	$144,156,605
7	Rush Hour	New Line Cinema	$141,186,864
8	Deep Impact	Paramount Pictures	$140,464,664
9	Godzilla	Sony Pictures Entertainment	$136,314,294
10	Patch Adams	Universal Pictures	$135,026,902

== January–March ==
Opening		Title	Production company	Cast and crew	Ref.
J A N U A R Y	9	Firestorm	20th Century Fox	Dean Semler (director); Chris Soth (screenplay); Howie Long, Scott Glenn, William Forsythe, Suzy Amis, Garwin Sanford, Sebastian Spence, Michael Greyeyes, Barry Pepper, Vladimir Kulich, Jonathon Young, Christianne Hirt, Tom McBeath, Benjamin Ratner, Alexandria Mitchell, Gavin Buhr, Danny Wattley, Derek Hamilton, Adrien Dorval, Jon Cuthbert, Deryl Hayes	
J A N U A R Y	16	Fallen	Warner Bros. Pictures / Turner Pictures / Atlas Entertainment	Gregory Hoblit (director); Nicholas Kazan (screenplay); Denzel Washington, John Goodman, Donald Sutherland, Embeth Davidtz, James Gandolfini, Elias Koteas, Gabriel Casseus, Michael J. Pagan, Robert Joy, Renee Spie	
J A N U A R Y	16	Half Baked	Universal Pictures	Tamra Davis (director); Dave Chappelle, Neal Brennan (screenplay); Dave Chappelle, Guillermo Díaz, Jim Breuer, Harland Williams, Clarence Williams III, Rachel True, Laura Silverman, Tommy Chong, Steven Wright, Tracy Morgan, Snoop Dogg, Jon Stewart, Stephen Baldwin, Willie Nelson, Bob Saget	
J A N U A R Y	16	Hard Rain	Paramount Pictures / PolyGram Filmed Entertainment / Mutual Film Company	Mikael Salomon (director); Graham Yost (screenplay); Morgan Freeman, Christian Slater, Randy Quaid, Minnie Driver, Edward Asner, Michael Goorjian, Dann Florek, Ricky Harris, Mark Rolston, Peter Murnik, Wayne Duvall, Richard Dysart, Betty White	
J A N U A R Y	16	Out of the Past		Jeff Dupre (director); Michelle Ferrari (screenplay); Leland Gantt, Barbara Gittings, Linda Hunt, Cherry Jones, Gwyneth Paltrow, Kelli Peterson, Edward Norton, Stephen Spinella	
J A N U A R Y	23	The Gingerbread Man	PolyGram Filmed Entertainment	Robert Altman (director); Al Hayes (screenplay); Kenneth Branagh, Embeth Davidtz, Robert Downey Jr., Daryl Hannah, Tom Berenger, Robert Duvall, Famke Janssen, Jesse James, Mae Whitman, Wilbur Fitzgerald	
J A N U A R Y	23	Phantoms	Miramax Films / Dimension Films	Joe Chappelle (director); Dean Koontz (screenplay); Peter O'Toole, Rose McGowan, Joanna Going, Liev Schreiber, Ben Affleck, Nicky Katt, Clifton Powell, Rick Otto, Valerie Chow, Adam Nelson, John Hammil, John Scott Clough, Michael DeLorenzo, William Hahn, Robert Kimber, Bo Hopkins, Robert Knepper, Linnea Quigley	
J A N U A R Y	23	Spice World	Columbia Pictures / PolyGram Filmed Entertainment / Icon Productions	Bob Spiers (director); Kim Fuller, Jamie Curtis (screenplay); Victoria Beckham, Melanie Brown, Emma Bunton, Melanie Chisholm, Geri Halliwell, Richard E. Grant, Alan Cumming, George Wendt, Mark McKinney, Claire Rushbrook, Roger Moore, Michael Barrymore, Richard Briers, Elvis Costello, David Fahm, Jason Flemyng, Neil Fox, Stephen Fry, Bob Geldof, Jools Holland, Bob Hoskins, Barry Humphries, Elton John, Craig Kelly, Hugh Laurie, Meat Loaf, Kevin McNally, Naoko Mori, Neil Mullarkey, Steven O'Donnell, Bill Paterson, Jonathan Ross, Jennifer Saunders, Simon Shepherd, Perdita Weeks, Dominic West	
J A N U A R Y	23	Star Kid	Trimark Pictures	Manny Coto (director/screenplay); Joseph Mazzello, Richard Gilliland, Corinne Bohrer, Alex Daniels, Arthur Burghardt, Joey Simmrin, Brian Simpson, Ashlee Levitch, Jack McGee, Danny Masterson, Lauren Eckstrom, Bobby Porter, Larry Nicholas, Rusty Hanson, Terry Castillo, Christine Weatherup	
J A N U A R Y	23	Swept from the Sea	TriStar Pictures / Phoenix Pictures	Beeban Kidron (director); Tim Willocks (screenplay); Vincent Pérez, Rachel Weisz, Ian McKellen, Joss Ackland, Kathy Bates, Tony Haygarth, Fiona Victory, Tom Bell, Zoë Wanamaker	
J A N U A R Y	30	Deep Rising	Hollywood Pictures / Cinergi Pictures	Stephen Sommers (director/screenplay); Treat Williams, Famke Janssen, Kevin J. O'Connor, Anthony Heald, Wes Studi, Derrick O'Connor, Cliff Curtis, Una Damon, Djimon Hounsou, Jason Flemyng, Clifton Powell, Trevor Goddard	
J A N U A R Y	30	Desperate Measures	TriStar Pictures / Mandalay Entertainment	Barbet Schroeder (director); David Klass (screenplay); Michael Keaton, Andy García, Brian Cox, Marcia Gay Harden, Erik King, Efrain Figueroa, Joseph Cross	
J A N U A R Y	30	Great Expectations	20th Century Fox	Alfonso Cuarón (director/screenplay); David Mamet, Mitch Glazer (screenplay); Ethan Hawke, Gwyneth Paltrow, Chris Cooper, Hank Azaria, Anne Bancroft, Robert De Niro, Josh Mostel, Kim Dickens, Nell Campbell, Gabriel Mann, Stephen Spinella	
J A N U A R Y	30	Zero Effect	Columbia Pictures / Castle Rock Entertainment	Jake Kasdan (director/screenplay); Bill Pullman, Ben Stiller, Kim Dickens, Angela Featherstone, Ryan O'Neal	
J A N U A R Y	31	Gia	HBO Pictures	Michael Cristofer (director/screenplay); Jay McInerney (screenplay); Angelina Jolie, Faye Dunaway, Mercedes Ruehl, Elizabeth Mitchell, Scott Cohen, Kylie Travis, Edmund Genest, Alexander Enberg, Louis Giambalvo, Eric Michael Cole, John Considine, Rick Batalla, Lombardo Boyar, Brian Donovan, Cee-Cee Harshaw, Mila Kunis, Tricia O'Neil, Sam Pancake, Adina Porter, Joan Pringle, Michael E. Rodgers, Holly Sampson, Nick Spano, Jason Stuart, Samantha Torres, Torsten Voges, James Haven, Audrey Wasilewski, Chuck Zito	
F E B R U A R Y	6	Blues Brothers 2000	Universal Pictures	John Landis (director/screenplay); Dan Aykroyd (screenplay); Dan Aykroyd, John Goodman, Joe Morton, J. Evan Bonifant, Steve Cropper, Donald "Duck" Dunn, Murphy Dunne, Willie Hall, Tom Malone, Lou Marini, Matt Murphy, Alan Rubin, Erykah Badu, Blues Traveler, Lonnie Brooks, Eddie Floyd, Aretha Franklin, James Brown, Jonny Lang, Sam Moore, Wilson Pickett, Junior Wells, Jeff Baxter, Gary U.S. Bonds, Eric Clapton, Clarence Clemons, Jack DeJohnette, Bo Diddley, Jon Faddis, Isaac Hayes, Dr. John, B.B. King, Tommy "Pipes" McDonnell, Charlie Musselwhite, Billy Preston, Lou Rawls, Joshua Redman, Paul Shaffer, Koko Taylor, Travis Tritt, Jimmie Vaughan, Grover Washington Jr., Willie Weeks, Steve Winwood, Kathleen Freeman, Frank Oz, Steve Lawrence, Shann Johnson, Jeff Morris, Nia Peeples, Darrell Hammond, John Lyons	
F E B R U A R Y	6	Nil by Mouth	20th Century Fox / ARP Selection / EuropaCorp / SE8 GROUP	Gary Oldman (director/screenplay); Ray Winstone, Kathy Burke, Charlie Creed-Miles, Laila Morse, Edna Doré, Chrissie Cotterill, Jon Morrison, Jamie Foreman, Steve Sweeney	
F E B R U A R Y	6	The Replacement Killers	Columbia Pictures	Antoine Fuqua (director); Ken Sanzel (screenplay); Chow Yun-fat, Mira Sorvino, Michael Rooker, Kenneth Tsang, Jürgen Prochnow, Til Schweiger, Danny Trejo, Clifton Gonzalez-Gonzalez, Carlos Gomez, Frank Medrano, Carlos Leon, Leo Lee, Patrick Kilpatrick, Randall Duk Kim, Andrew J. Marton, Sydney Coberly	
F E B R U A R Y	13	The Borrowers	PolyGram Filmed Entertainment / Working Title Films	Peter Hewitt (director); Tim Bevan, Eric Fellner, Rachel Talalay (screenplay); John Goodman, Jim Broadbent, Mark Williams, Hugh Laurie, Bradley Pierce, Celia Imrie, Flora Newbigin, Tom Felton, Raymond Pickard, Ruby Wax, Aden Gillett, Doon Mackichan, Bob Goody, Alex Winter	
F E B R U A R Y	13	Sphere	Warner Bros. Pictures / Baltimore Pictures	Barry Levinson (director); Kurt Wimmer, Stephen Hauser, Paul Attanasio (screenplay); Dustin Hoffman, Sharon Stone, Samuel L. Jackson, Liev Schreiber, Peter Coyote, Queen Latifah, Marga Gomez, Huey Lewis, Bernard Hocke, James Pickens Jr., Michael Keys Hall, Ralph Tabakin	
F E B R U A R Y	13	The Wedding Singer	New Line Cinema / Brillstein-Grey Entertainment	Frank Coraci (director); Tim Herlihy (screenplay); Adam Sandler, Drew Barrymore, Christine Taylor, Jodi Thelen, Allen Covert, Angela Featherstone, Matthew Glave, Ellen Albertini Dow, Alexis Arquette, Christina Pickles, Frank Sivero, Billy Idol, Kevin Nealon, Steven Brill, Steve Buscemi, Peter Dante, Jon Lovitz, Brian Posehn, Michael Shuman, Robert Smigel, Chauntal Lewis	
F E B R U A R Y	20	Dangerous Beauty	Warner Bros. Pictures / Regency Enterprises / Bedford Falls Productions	Marshall Herskovitz (director); Jeannine Dominy (screenplay); Catherine McCormack, Rufus Sewell, Oliver Platt, Moira Kelly, Fred Ward, Jacqueline Bisset, Naomi Watts, Jeroen Krabbé, Joanna Cassidy, Melina Kanakaredes, Daniel Lapaine, Justine Miceli, Jake Weber, Simon Dutton, Grant Russell	
F E B R U A R Y	20	Mrs Dalloway	First Look Pictures / First Look International / Newmarket Capitol Group / BBC Films	Marleen Gorris (director); Eileen Atkins (screenplay); Vanessa Redgrave, Natascha McElhone, Rupert Graves, Michael Kitchen, Alan Cox, Lena Headey, Amelia Bullmore, Sarah Badel, John Standing, Oliver Ford Davies, Margaret Tyzack, Robert Hardy, Richenda Carey, Katie Carr, Selina Cadell, Amanda Drew, Phyllis Calvert	
F E B R U A R Y	20	Palmetto	Columbia Pictures / Castle Rock Entertainment	Volker Schlöndorff (director); E. Max Frye (screenplay); Woody Harrelson, Elisabeth Shue, Gina Gershon, Rolf Hoppe, Michael Rapaport, Chloë Sevigny, Tom Wright, Marc Macaulay, Richard Booker	
F E B R U A R Y	20	Senseless	Miramax Films / Dimension Films / Mandeville Films	Penelope Spheeris (director); Greg Erb, Craig Mazin (screenplay); Marlon Wayans, David Spade, Matthew Lillard, Brad Dourif, Tamara Taylor, Rip Torn, Esther Scott, Richard McGonagle, Kenya Moore, Vicellous Shannon, Ernie Lively, Patrick Ewing, Greg Grunberg, Debra Jo Rupp, Mark Christopher Lawrence, Sherman Hemsley	
F E B R U A R Y	27	An Alan Smithee Film: Burn Hollywood Burn	Hollywood Pictures / Cinergi Pictures	Arthur Hiller (director); Joe Eszterhas (screenplay); Eric Idle, Ryan O'Neal, Coolio, Chuck D, Richard Jeni, Leslie Stefanson, Sandra Bernhard, Cherie Lunghi, Harvey Weinstein, Gavin Polone, MC Lyte, Marcello Thedford, Stephen Tobolowsky, Erik King, Dina Spybey, Sylvester Stallone, Whoopi Goldberg, Jackie Chan, Robert Evans, Robert Shapiro, Shane Black, Mario Machado, Lisa Canning, Joe Eszterhas, Larry King, Peter Bart, Dominick Dunne, Billy Bob Thornton, Billy Barty, Nicole Nagel, Jim Piddock, Naomi Campbell, Marianne Muellerleile, Suli McCullough, Duane Davis, Stanley Ralph Ross, Norman Jewison	
F E B R U A R Y	27	Caught Up	Live Entertainment	Darin Scott (director/screenplay); Bokeem Woodbine, Cynda Williams, Jeffrey Combs, Michael Clarke Duncan, Joseph Lindsey, LL Cool J, Jeris Poindexter, Clifton Powell, Snoop Dogg, Tony Todd, Basil Wallace, Jason Carmichael, Shedric Hunter Jr., Marcus Johnson, Courtney McLean, Damon Saleem, Chris Brown	
F E B R U A R Y	27	Dark City	New Line Cinema	Alex Proyas (director/screenplay); Lem Dobbs, David S. Goyer (screenplay); Rufus Sewell, Kiefer Sutherland, Jennifer Connelly, Richard O'Brien, Ian Richardson, William Hurt, Bruce Spence, Colin Friels, John Bluthal, Melissa George, Ritchie Singer, Nicholas Bell, David Wenham, Mitchell Butel	
F E B R U A R Y	27	Eight Days a Week	Legacy Releasing Corporation / Underdog Productions	Michael Davis (director/screenplay); Josh Schaefer, Keri Russell, R. D. Robb, Buck Kartalian, Catherine Hicks, Patrick Thomas O'Brien, Darleen Carr, Mark Taylor, Marcia Shapiro, Johnny Green, Biff Manard, Annie O'Donnell, Ernestine Mercer, Bill Hollis, Jean Pflieger, Hunter Phoenix	
F E B R U A R Y	27	Kissing a Fool	Universal Pictures / Largo Entertainment	Doug Ellin (director/screenplay); James Frey (screenplay); David Schwimmer, Jason Lee, Mili Avital, Bonnie Hunt, Kari Wuhrer, Vanessa Angel, Bitty Schram, Judy Greer, Frank Medrano, Jayson Fate, Antimo Fiore, Doug Ellin, Sammy Sosa, Jerry Springer	
F E B R U A R Y	27	Krippendorf's Tribe	Touchstone Pictures	Todd Holland (director); Charlie Peters (screenplay); Richard Dreyfuss, Jenna Elfman, Natasha Lyonne, Lily Tomlin, Barbara Williams, Gregory Smith, Carl Michael Lindner, Stephen Root, Mila Kunis, David Ogden Stiers, Doris Belack, Frances Bay, Sandy Martin	
F E B R U A R Y	27	The Real Blonde	Paramount Pictures / Lakeshore Entertainment	Tom DiCillo (director/screenplay); Matthew Modine, Catherine Keener, Daryl Hannah, Maxwell Caulfield, Elizabeth Berkley, Marlo Thomas, Bridgette Wilson, Buck Henry, Christopher Lloyd, Kathleen Turner, Denis Leary, Steve Buscemi, Dave Chappelle, Beatrice Winde	
F E B R U A R Y	28	The Pentagon Wars	HBO NYC Productions	Richard Benjamin (director); Jamie Malanowski, Martyn Burke (screenplay); Kelsey Grammer, Cary Elwes, Viola Davis, John C. McGinley, Olympia Dukakis, Tom Wright, Clifton Powell, Dewey Weber, Richard Schiff, J.C. MacKenzie, Richard Benjamin, Sam Anderson, Randy Oglesby, Billie Worley, Dann Florek, Beau Billingslea, Richard Riehle, Chris Ellis, Charles Parks, Drew Snyder, Kevin Scannell, James DuMont, Bruce French, Matt Champagne, Tim DeKay	
M A R C H	6	The Big Lebowski	Gramercy Pictures / PolyGram Filmed Entertainment / Working Title Films	Joel and Ethan Coen (directors/screenplay); Jeff Bridges, John Goodman, Julianne Moore, Steve Buscemi, David Huddleston, John Turturro, Tara Reid, Philip Seymour Hoffman, Sam Elliott, Philip Moon, Mark Pellegrino, Peter Stormare, Torsten Voges, Flea, Jimmie Dale Gilmore, Jack Kehler, David Thewlis, Ben Gazzara, Jon Polito, Leon Russom, Aimee Mann, Dom Irrera, Harry Bugin, Warren Keith, Marshall Manesh, Asia Carrera, Richard Gant, Christian Clemenson, Jesse Flanagan	
M A R C H	6	Hush	TriStar Pictures	Jonathan Darby (director/screenplay); Jane Rusconi (screenplay); Jessica Lange, Gwyneth Paltrow, Johnathon Schaech, Nina Foch, Hal Holbrook, Debi Mazar, Kaiulani Lee, David Thornton, Richard Lineback	
M A R C H	6	Twilight	Paramount Pictures	Robert Benton (director/screenplay); Richard Russo (screenplay); Paul Newman, Susan Sarandon, Gene Hackman, Reese Witherspoon, Stockard Channing, James Garner, Giancarlo Esposito, Liev Schreiber, Margo Martindale, John Spencer, M. Emmet Walsh, Clint Howard	
M A R C H	6	U.S. Marshals	Warner Bros. Pictures	Stuart Baird (director); Roy Huggins, John Pogue (screenplay); Tommy Lee Jones, Wesley Snipes, Robert Downey Jr., Joe Pantoliano, Kate Nelligan, Irène Jacob, Daniel Roebuck, Tom Wood, LaTanya Richardson, Patrick Malahide, Rick Snyder, Michael Paul Chan, Tracy Letts, Len Bajenski	
M A R C H	13	Chairman of the Board	Trimark Pictures	Alex Zamm (director/screenplay); Al Septien, Turi Meyer (screenplay); Carrot Top, Courtney Thorne-Smith, Larry Miller, Raquel Welch, Mystro Clark, Jack Plotnick, Jack Warden, Estelle Harris, Bill Irwin, M. Emmet Walsh, Jack McGee, Glenn Shadix, Fred Stoller, Taylor Negron, Jack Riley, Rance Howard, Mark Kriski, Cindy Margolis, Butterbean, Little Richard	
M A R C H	13	The Man in the Iron Mask	United Artists	Randall Wallace (director/screenplay); Leonardo DiCaprio, Jeremy Irons, John Malkovich, Gérard Depardieu, Gabriel Byrne, Hugh Laurie, Anne Parillaud, Judith Godrèche, Peter Sarsgaard, Edward Atterton, David Lowe	
M A R C H	17	Batman & Mr. Freeze: SubZero	Warner Home Video	Boyd Kirkland (director/screenplay); Randy Rogel (screenplay); Kevin Conroy, Michael Ansara, Loren Lester, Mary Kay Bergman, Robert Costanzo, Mari Devon, George Dzundza, Bob Hastings, Marilu Henner, Dean Jones, Efrem Zimbalist Jr., Lauren Tom, Townsend Coleman, Brian George, Ed Gilbert, Carl Lumbly, Tress MacNeille, Neil Ross, Frank Welker, Rahi Azizi, Liane Schirmer, Randy Thompson	
M A R C H	17	FernGully 2: The Magical Rescue	20th Century Fox Home Entertainment / FAI Films / Rosen Harper Entertainment / Wild Brain Productions	Phil Robinson, Dave Marshall (directors); Chris Fink, Richard Tulloch (screenplay); Laura Erlich, Harry Joseph, Gary Martin, Matt K. Miller, Digory Oaks, Westin Peace, Erik Bergmann, Connie Champagne, Holly Conner, David Rasner, Phil Robinson, J.F. Rockstar, K.T. Vogt, Jamie Baker	
M A R C H	20	Niagara, Niagara	The Shooting Gallery	Bob Gosse (director); Matthew Weiss (screenplay); Henry Thomas, Robin Tunney, Michael Parks, Stephen Lang, Candy Clark, John Ventimiglia, Clea DuVall, Shawn Hatosy, Jonathan Wong, Justin Salsberg	
M A R C H	20	Primary Colors	Universal Pictures / Mutual Film Company	Mike Nichols (director); Elaine May (screenplay); John Travolta, Emma Thompson, Billy Bob Thornton, Kathy Bates, Adrian Lester, Maura Tierney, Larry Hagman, Stacy Edwards, Diane Ladd, Paul Guilfoyle, Kevin Cooney, Rebecca Walker, Caroline Aaron, Tommy Hollis, Rob Reiner, Ben L. Jones, J. C. Quinn, Allison Janney, Robert Klein, Mykelti Williamson, Robert Easton, Geraldo Rivera, Charlie Rose, Larry King, Chelcie Ross, Tony Shalhoub, John Vargas, Robert Cicchini, Gia Carides, Bill Maher, Sophia Choi	
M A R C H	20	Wild Things	Columbia Pictures / Mandalay Entertainment	John McNaughton (director); Stephen Peters (screenplay); Kevin Bacon, Matt Dillon, Neve Campbell, Denise Richards, Robert Wagner, Bill Murray, Theresa Russell, Daphne Rubin-Vega, Carrie Snodgress, Jeff Perry, Marc Macaulay, Cory Pendergast, Paulo Benedeti, Eduardo Yáñez, Jennifer Taylor	
M A R C H	20	Wide Awake	Miramax Films	M. Night Shyamalan (director/screenplay); Denis Leary, Dana Delany, Joseph Cross, Rosie O'Donnell, Timothy Reifsnyder, Robert Loggia, Camryn Manheim, Julia Stiles, Dan Lauria, Michael Shulman, Gil Robbins, Liam Mitchell, Vicki Giunta, Heather Casler, Stefan Niemczyk, Michael Pacienza, Jaret Ross Barron, Jarrett Abello, Joseph Melito Jr., Peter A. Urban Jr. Marc H. Glick, Deborah Stein, Joey Perillo, Antoine McLean, Arleen Goman	
M A R C H	21	Always Outnumbered	HBO Pictures	Michael Apted (director); Walter Mosley (screenplay); Laurence Fishburne, Bill Cobbs, Natalie Cole, Daniel Williams, Cicely Tyson, Laurie Metcalf, Alan Wilder, Bridgid Coulter, Bill Nunn, Isaiah Washington, Bill Duke, Kevin Carroll, Jamaal Carter, John Toles-Bey, Brooke Marie Bridges, John Gavigan, Perry Moore, Sammi Rotibi, Art Evans, Danny Goldring, Dan Martin, Paula Jai Parker	
M A R C H	25	A Price Above Rubies	Miramax Films	Boaz Yakin (director/screenplay); Renée Zellweger, Christopher Eccleston, Allen Payne, Glenn Fitzgerald, Julianna Margulies, Shelton Dane, Kim Hunter, John Randolph, Kathleen Chalfant, Peter Jacobson, Edie Falco, Allen Swift	
M A R C H	27	Grease (re-release)	Paramount Pictures	Randal Kleiser (director); Bronte Woodard (screenplay); John Travolta, Olivia Newton-John, Stockard Channing, Jeff Conaway, Barry Pearl, Michael Tucci, Kelly Ward, Didi Conn, Jamie Donnelly, Dinah Manoff, Eve Arden, Dody Goodman, Sid Caesar, Eddie Deezen, Susan Buckner, Lorenzo Lamas, Dennis C. Stewart, Annette Charles, Joan Blondell, Ellen Travolta, Frankie Avalon, Edd Byrnes, Sha-Na-Na, Alice Ghostley, Darrell Zwerling, Dick Patterson, Fannie Flagg	
M A R C H	27	Meet the Deedles	Walt Disney Pictures / DIC Entertainment	Steve Boyum (director); Jim Herzfeld (screenplay); Paul Walker, Steve Van Wormer, A. J. Langer, John Ashton, Robert Englund, Dennis Hopper, Eric Braeden, Richard Lineback, M. C. Gainey, Ana Gasteyer, Megan Cavanagh, Hattie Winston, Bart the Bear, Oingo Boingo	
M A R C H	27	The Newton Boys	20th Century Fox	Richard Linklater (director/screenplay); Clara Lee Walker (screenplay); Matthew McConaughey, Skeet Ulrich, Ethan Hawke, Vincent D'Onofrio, Julianna Margulies, Dwight Yoakam, Gail Cronauer, Anne Stedman, Lew Temple, Charles Gunning, Ken Farmer	
M A R C H	27	The Proposition	PolyGram Filmed Entertainment	Lesli Linka Glatter (director); Rick Ramage (screenplay); Kenneth Branagh, Madeleine Stowe, William Hurt, Neil Patrick Harris, Robert Loggia, Blythe Danner, Ken Cheeseman, Josef Sommer, Thomas Downey, Michael Bradshaw	
M A R C H	27	Ride	Dimension Films	Millicent Shelton (director/screenplay); Malik Yoba, Melissa De Sousa, John Witherspoon, Fredro Starr, Cedric the Entertainer, Kellie Shanygne Williams, Sticky Fingaz, Idalis DeLeón, Guy Torry, The Lady of Rage, Dartanyan Edmonds, Downtown Julie Brown, Julia Garrison, Luther Campbell, Rueben Asher, Snoop Dogg	

== April–June ==
Opening		Title	Production company	Cast and crew	Ref.
A P R I L	3	Barney's Great Adventure	PolyGram Filmed Entertainment / Lyons Partnership / Lyrick Studios	Steve Gomer (director); Stephen White (screenplay); David Joyner, Bob West, Trevor Morgan, Diana Rice, Kyla Pratt, Jeff Ayers, Julie Johnson, Jeff Brooks, Patty Wirtz, George Hearn, Shirley Douglas, David and Edouard Larouche, Renee Madeline Le Guerrier, Roch Jutras, Alan Fawcett, Jane Wheeler	
A P R I L	3	Lost in Space	New Line Cinema	Stephen Hopkins (director); Akiva Goldsman (screenplay); William Hurt, Mimi Rogers, Heather Graham, Lacey Chabert, Jack Johnson, Jared Harris, Matt LeBlanc, Gary Oldman, Dick Tufeld, Lennie James, Mark Goddard, June Lockhart, Marta Kristen, Angela Cartwright, Edward Fox, Gary A. Hecker	
A P R I L	3	Mercury Rising	Universal Pictures / Imagine Entertainment	Harold Becker (director); Lawrence Konner, Mark Rosenthal (screenplay); Bruce Willis, Alec Baldwin, Miko Hughes, Chi McBride, Kim Dickens, John Carroll Lynch, Kelley Hazen, L.L. Ginter, Robert Stanton, Bodhi Elfman, Kevin Conway, Carrie Preston, Peter Stormare, John Doman, Richard Riehle, Jack Conley	
A P R I L	3	The Spanish Prisoner	Sony Pictures Classics	David Mamet (director/screenplay); Campbell Scott, Steve Martin, Ben Gazzara, Felicity Huffman, Ricky Jay, Rebecca Pidgeon	
A P R I L	8	The Players Club	New Line Cinema	Ice Cube (director/screenplay); LisaRaye, Bernie Mac, Monica Calhoun, A.J. Johnson, Ice Cube, Alex Thomas, Jamie Foxx, John Amos, Luther Campbell, Michael Clarke Duncan, Montae Russell, Samuel Monroe Jr., Terrence Howard, Faizon Love, Charlie Murphy, Big Boy, Oren Williams, Dick Anthony Williams, Judyann Elder, Adele Givens, Badja Djola, Tommy "Tiny" Lister Jr., Nigel Thatch, Master P, Chrystale Wilson, Tracey Cherelle Jones, Bettina Rae, Larry McCoy, Ronn Riser	
A P R I L	10	3 Ninjas: High Noon at Mega Mountain	TriStar Pictures	Sean McNamara (director/screenplay); Jeff Philips (screenplay); Hulk Hogan, Loni Anderson, Jim Varney, Mathew Botuchis, Michael O'Laskey II, James Paul Roeske II, Brian Carl, Victor Wong, Alan McRae	
A P R I L	10	The Big One	Miramax Films	Michael Moore (director); Michael Moore	
A P R I L	10	City of Angels	Warner Bros. Pictures / Regency Enterprises / Atlas Entertainment	Brad Silberling (director); Dana Stevens (screenplay); Nicolas Cage, Meg Ryan, Andre Braugher, Dennis Franz, Colm Feore, Robin Bartlett, Joanna Merlin, Amy Brenneman, Elisabeth Shue, Deirdre O'Connell, Kim Murphy, Chad Lindberg, Jay Patterson, Shishir Kurup, Brian Markinson, Nick Offerman, Kieu Chinh, Geoffrey Thorne, Peter Spellos, Alexander Gould, John Putch, Lauri Johnson, Bernard White	
A P R I L	10	My Giant	Columbia Pictures / Castle Rock Entertainment	Michael Lehmann (director); Billy Crystal, David Seltzer (screenplay); Billy Crystal, Gheorghe Mureșan, Kathleen Quinlan, Joanna Pacuła, Zane Carney, Dan Castellaneta, Steven Seagal, Doris Roberts, Jere Burns, Raymond O'Connor, Rider Strong, Lorna Luft, Harold Gould, Carl Ballantine, Eric Lloyd, Ajay Naidu, Estelle Harris, Philip Sterling, Max Goldblatt, Michael Papajohn, Heather Thomas, Rick Overton, Richard Portnow, Nicki Micheaux, Lawrence Pressman, Joss Ackland, Verne Troyer	
A P R I L	10	The Odd Couple II	Paramount Pictures	Howard Deutch (director); Neil Simon (screenplay); Jack Lemmon, Walter Matthau, Richard Riehle, Jonathan Silverman, Lisa Waltz, Mary Beth Peil, Christine Baranski, Jean Smart, Rex Linn, Jay O. Sanders, Barnard Hughes, Ellen Geer, Doris Belack, Lou Cutell, Mary Fogarty, Alice Ghostley, Peggy Miley, Rebecca Schull, Florence Stanley, Estelle Harris, Amy Yasbeck, Liz Torres, Myles Jeffrey, Daisy Velez, Joaquín Martínez, Amy Parrish	
A P R I L	10	Species II	Metro-Goldwyn-Mayer	Peter Medak (director); Chris Brancato (screenplay); Natasha Henstridge, Michael Madsen, Marg Helgenberger, Mykelti Williamson, George Dzundza, James Cromwell, Justin Lazard, Richard Belzer, Sarah Wynter, Myriam Cyr, Peter Boyle, Henderson Forsythe, Robert Hogan, Ted Sutton, Susan Duvall, Bill Boggs, Monica Staggs, Baxter Harris, Scott Morgan, Nancy La Scala, Raquel Gardner, Kim Adams, Nicholas Vota	
A P R I L	17	Chinese Box	Trimark Pictures	Wayne Wang (director/screenplay); Jean-Claude Carrière, Larry Gross, Paul Theroux (screenplay); Jeremy Irons, Gong Li, Maggie Cheung, Michael Hui, Rubén Blades, Jared Harris	
A P R I L	17	Homegrown	TriStar Pictures / Lakeshore Entertainment	Stephen Gyllenhaal (director/screenplay); Nicholas Kazan (screenplay); Billy Bob Thornton, Hank Azaria, Kelly Lynch, Jon Bon Jovi, Ryan Phillippe, Judge Reinhold, Jon Tenney, Ted Danson, John Lithgow, Jamie Lee Curtis, Matt Ross, Leigh French, Tiffany Paulsen, Jake Gyllenhaal, Steve Carell, Ramsay Midwood	
A P R I L	17	Major League: Back to the Minors	Warner Bros. Pictures / Morgan Creek Productions	John Warren (director/screenplay); David S. Ward (screenplay); Scott Bakula, Corbin Bernsen, Ted McGinley, Dennis Haysbert, Bob Uecker, Kenny Johnson, Thom Barry, Eric Bruskotter, Takaaki Ishibashi, Judson Mills, Walton Goggins, Peter Mackenzie, Jensen Daggett, Steve Yeager, Lobo Sebastian	
A P R I L	17	Nightwatch	Dimension Films	Ole Bornedal (director/screenplay); Steven Soderbergh (screenplay); Ewan McGregor, Patricia Arquette, Josh Brolin, Lauren Graham, Nick Nolte, Brad Dourif, Alix Koromzay, Anais Evans, Lonny Chapman, Larry Cedar, Sandra Hess, John C. Reilly	
A P R I L	17	The Object of My Affection	20th Century Fox	Nicholas Hytner (director); Wendy Wasserstein (screenplay); Jennifer Aniston, Paul Rudd, John Pankow, Allison Janney, Alan Alda, Tim Daly, Joan Copeland, Steve Zahn, Nigel Hawthorne, Kali Rocha, Gabriel Macht, Sarah Hyland, Hayden Panettiere, Liam Aiken, Bruce Altman, Daniel Cosgrove, Samia Shoaib, Audra McDonald, Lauren Pratt, Paz de la Huerta, Salem Ludwig, Antonia Rey, John Roland, Rosanna Scotto, Kevin Carroll, Kia Goodwin	
A P R I L	17	Paulie	DreamWorks / Mutual Film Company	John Roberts (director); Laurie Craig (screenplay); Jay Mohr, Tony Shalhoub, Gena Rowlands, Hallie Kate Eisenberg, Cheech Marin, Bruce Davison, Trini Alvarado, Buddy Hackett, Matt Craven, Bill Cobbs, Tia Texada, Laura Harrington, Jerry Winsett	
A P R I L	17	Sour Grapes	Columbia Pictures / Castle Rock Entertainment	Larry David (director/screenplay); Steven Weber, Craig Bierko, Matt Keeslar, Karen Sillas, Viola Harris, Orlando Jones, Deirdre Lovejoy, Richard Gant, Philip Baker Hall, Kristin Davis, Larry David, Alan Wilder, Rosanna Huffman, Iqbal Theba, James MacDonald, Ann Guilbert, Jack Kehler, Sonya Eddy, Jill Talley, Bryan Gordon, Julie Claire, Patrick Fabian, Kevin Shinick, Meredith Salenger, Linda Wallem, Bruce Jarchow, Tucker Smallwood, Larry Brandenburg, Robyn Peterman, Jennifer Leigh Warren, John Toles-Bey	
A P R I L	17	Suicide Kings	Artisan Entertainment	Peter O'Fallon (director); Josh McKinney, Gina Goldman, Wayne Rice (screenplay); Christopher Walken, Denis Leary, Sean Patrick Flanery, Johnny Galecki, Jay Mohr, Jeremy Sisto, Henry Thomas, Cliff DeYoung, Laura San Giacomo, Brad Garrett, Frank Medrano, Laura Harris, Nina Siemaszko, Lisanne Falk, Louis Lombardi, Barry Del Sherman, Kevin Crowley, Joseph Cali, Joseph Whipp, Sean Whalen	
A P R I L	17	Wild Man Blues	Fine Line Features	Barbara Kopple (director); Woody Allen, New Orleans Jazz Band	
A P R I L	24	The Big Hit	TriStar Pictures	Che-Kirk Wong (director); Ben Ramsey (screenplay); Mark Wahlberg, Lou Diamond Phillips, Christina Applegate, Bokeem Woodbine, Antonio Sabàto Jr., Avery Brooks, China Chow, Elliott Gould, Lainie Kazan, Lela Rochon, Sab Shimono, Robin Dunne	
A P R I L	24	Music from Another Room	Orion Pictures	Charlie Peters (director/screenplay); Jude Law, Jennifer Tilly, Gretchen Mol, Martha Plimpton, Brenda Blethyn, Jon Tenney, Jeremy Piven, Vincent Laresca, Jane Adams, Bruce Jarchow, Adam Wessner, Alec Wessner	
A P R I L	24	Sliding Doors	Miramax Films / Mirage Enterprises	Peter Howitt (director/screenplay); Gwyneth Paltrow, John Hannah, John Lynch, Jeanne Tripplehorn, Virginia McKenna, Zara Turner, Paul Brightwell, Nina Young, Kevin McNally, Christopher Villiers	
A P R I L	24	Tarzan and the Lost City	Warner Bros. Pictures / Village Roadshow Pictures	Carl Schenkel (director); Bayard Johnson, J. Anderson Black (screenplay); Casper Van Dien, Jane March, Steven Waddington, Winston Ntshona, Rapulana Seiphemo, Ian Roberts, Sean Taylor, Gys De Villiers	
A P R I L	24	The Truce	Miramax Films	Francesco Rosi (director/screenplay); Stefano Rulli, Sandro Petraglia, Primo Levi (screenplay); John Turturro, Rade Serbedzija, Massimo Ghini, Stefano Dionisi, Teco Celio, Roberto Citran, Claudio Bisio, Andy Luotto, Agnieszka Wagner, Lorenza Indovina, Marina Gerasimenko, Igor Bezgin, Aleksandr Ilyin, Vyacheslav Olkhovskiy, Anatoli Vasilyev	
A P R I L	24	Two Girls and a Guy	Fox Searchlight Pictures	James Toback (director/screenplay); Robert Downey Jr., Heather Graham, Natasha Gregson Wagner, Frederique van der Wal, Angel David	
M A Y	1	Black Dog	Universal Pictures / Mutual Film Company	Kevin Hooks (director); William Mickelberry, Dan Vining (screenplay); Patrick Swayze, Randy Travis, Meat Loaf, Graham Beckel, Brenda Strong, Charles S. Dutton, Lorraine Toussaint, Stephen Tobolowsky, Gabriel Casseus, Brian Vincent, Rusty DeWees, Cyril O'Reilly, Erin Broderick	
M A Y	1	Dancer, Texas Pop. 81	TriStar Pictures	Tim McCanlies (director/screenplay); Breckin Meyer, Peter Facinelli, Ethan Embry, Eddie Mills, Ashley Johnson, Patricia Wettig, Michael O'Neill, Eddie Jones, Wayne Tippit, Alexandra Holden, Keith Szarabajka, Shawn Weatherly	
M A Y	1	He Got Game	Touchstone Pictures / 40 Acres and a Mule Filmworks	Spike Lee (director/screenplay); Denzel Washington, Ray Allen, Milla Jovovich, John Turturro, Rosario Dawson, Jim Brown, Hill Harper, Zelda Harris, Ned Beatty, Bill Nunn, Thomas Jefferson Byrd, Roger Guenveur Smith, Lonette McKee, Travis Best, Walter McCarty, Kim Director, John Wallace, Rick Fox, Leonard Roberts, Jennifer Esposito, Chasey Lain, Jill Kelly, Al Palagonia, Arthur J. Nascarella, Ron Cephas Jones, Lute Olson, John Chaney, John Thompson, Roy Williams, Nolan Richardson, Denny Crum, Tom Davis, Clem Haskins, George Karl, Jim Boeheim, Richard Pitino, Robert "Bobby" Cremins, Dick Vitale, Bill Walton, Shaquille O'Neal, Reggie Miller, Charles Barkley, Scottie Pippen, Michael Jordan, Robin Roberts, Gus Johnson, Stuart Scott, Ray Clay, J.C. MacKenzie, Coati Mundi, Lin Que Ayoung, Jamie Hector, Mark Breland, Heather Hunter, Arthur Agee, William Gates	
M A Y	1	Les Misérables	Columbia Pictures / Mandalay Entertainment	Bille August (director); Rafael Yglesias (screenplay); Liam Neeson, Geoffrey Rush, Uma Thurman, Claire Danes, Hans Matheson, Jon Kenny, John McGlynn, Kelly Hunter, Lennie James, Peter Vaughan, Julian Rhind-Tutt, David Birkin, Ben Crompton, Patsy Byrne, Frank O'Sullivan, Christopher Adamson, Tim Barlow, Shannon McCormick, Reine Brynolfsson, Kathleen Byron, Toby Jones, Edward Tudor-Pole, Gillian Hanna	
M A Y	8	Deep Impact	Paramount Pictures / DreamWorks	Mimi Leder (director); Bruce Joel Rubin, Michael Tolkin (screenplay); Robert Duvall, Téa Leoni, Elijah Wood, Vanessa Redgrave, Maximilian Schell, Leelee Sobieski, Morgan Freeman, James Cromwell, Kurtwood Smith, Ron Eldard, Jon Favreau, Dougray Scott, Mary McCormack, Denise Crosby, Blair Underwood, Richard Schiff, Laura Innes, Bruce Weitz, Betsy Brantley, O'Neal Compton, Rya Kihlstedt, Aleksandr Baluev, Una Damon, Mark Moses, Derek de Lint, Suzy Nakamura, Alimi Ballard, Charles Martin Smith, Jason Dohring, Hannah Leder, Tucker Smallwood, Merrin Dungey, Kimberly Huie, Francis X. McCarthy, Ellen Bry, Leslie Dilley, Concetta Tomei, Mike O'Malley, Gerry Griffin, Jennifer Jostyn, Don Handfield, Cynthia Ettinger, Michael Winters, John Ducey, W. Earl Brown, Charles Rahi Chun, Bob Glouberman, Thomas Rosales Jr.	
M A Y	8	Woo	New Line Cinema	Daisy von Scherler Mayer (director); David C. Johnson (screenplay); Jada Pinkett Smith, Tommy Davidson, Dave Chappelle, Duane Martin, LL Cool J, Orlando Jones, Michael Ralph, Paula Jai Parker, Foxy Brown, Nicci Gilbert, Aida Turturro, Joanna Bacalso, Lenny Solomon, Jsu Garcia, Victor Chan, Philip Akin, Natalie Venetia Belcon, Buddy Lewis	
M A Y	15	Bulworth	20th Century Fox	Warren Beatty (director/screenplay); Jeremy Pikser (screenplay); Warren Beatty, Halle Berry, Oliver Platt, Don Cheadle, Paul Sorvino, Jack Warden, Isaiah Washington, Christine Baranski, Amiri Baraka, Joshua Malina, Sean Astin, Barry Shabaka Henley, Helen Martin, Kirk Baltz, Ernie Lee Banks, Adilah Barnes, Graham Beckel, Thomas Jefferson Byrd, J. Kenneth Campbell, Scott Michael Campbell, Jann Carl, Kevin Cooney, Christopher Curry, Stanley DeSantis, Michael Clarke Duncan, Nora Dunn, Jerry Dunphy, Leon Curtis Frierson, Robin Gammell, Jackie Gayle, Randee Heller, Brian Hooks, Myra J., Mario Jackson, Ariyan Johnson, Larry King, Deborah Lacey, Armelia McQueen, Laurie Metcalf, Michael Milhoan, Jamal Mixon, Jerod Mixon, Debra Monk, Deborah Moore, Chris Mulkey, Lou Myers, Ron Ostrow, James Pickens Jr., Wendell Pierce, Arthur Reggie III, Richard Sarafian, Sarah Silverman, Florence Stanley, Robin Thomas, Sheryl Underwood, Jermaine Williams, John Witherspoon, William Baldwin, Hart Bochner, Pat Buchanan, Bill Clinton, Bob Dole, Steve Forbes, Al Gore, George Hamilton, Robert F. Kennedy, Paul Mazursky, John McLaughlin, Josef Sommer	
M A Y	15	Clockwatchers	BMG Independents	Jill Sprecher (director/screenplay); Karen Sprecher (screenplay); Toni Collette, Parker Posey, Lisa Kudrow, Alanna Ubach, Helen FitzGerald, Stanley DeSantis, Jamie Kennedy, David James Elliott, Debra Jo Rupp, Kevin Cooney, Bob Balaban, Paul Dooley, Scott Mosenson, Joshua Malina, O-Lan Jones, Joe Chrest, Michelle Arthur, Jim Wise, Sully Díaz, Terri Hoyos, Jaime Gomez, Shauna Wilson	
M A Y	15	The Horse Whisperer	Touchstone Pictures	Robert Redford (director); Eric Roth, Richard LaGravenese (screenplay); Robert Redford, Kristin Scott Thomas, Sam Neill, Dianne Wiest, Scarlett Johansson, Chris Cooper, Cherry Jones, Ty Hillman, Kate Bosworth, Jessalyn Gilsig, Jeanette Nolan, Allison Moorer, Stephen Pearlman, Joelle Carter, Gloria Lynne Henry	
M A Y	15	Quest for Camelot	Warner Bros. Pictures / Warner Bros. Feature Animation	Frederik Du Chau (director); Kirk DeMicco, William Schifrin, Jacqueline Feather, David Seidler (screenplay); Jessalyn Gilsig, Cary Elwes, Jane Seymour, Pierce Brosnan, Gary Oldman, Eric Idle, Don Rickles, Bronson Pinchot, Jaleel White, Gabriel Byrne, John Gielgud, Al Roker, Frank Welker, Jess Harnell, Jack Angel, Bob Bergen, Rodger Bumpass, Philip L. Clarke, Jennifer Darling, Paul Eiding, Fionnula Flanagan, Sherry Lynn, Danny Mann, Sarah Freeman, Mickie McGowan	
M A Y	19	The Brave Little Toaster Goes to Mars	Walt Disney Home Video	Robert C. Ramirez (director); Willard Carroll (screenplay); Deanna Oliver, Thurl Ravenscroft, Roger Kabler, Timothy Stack, Eric Lloyd, Andy Milder, Fyvush Finkel, Stephen Tobolowsky, Farrah Fawcett, Wayne Knight, Chris Young, Jessica Tuck, Russi Taylor, Brian Doyle-Murray, Carol Channing, DeForest Kelley, Alan King, Kath Soucie, Jim Cummings, Scott Menville, Paddi Edwards, James Murray, Liz Callaway, Marva Hicks, Sally Stevens, Charlie Adler, Eric Bauza, Jeff Bennett, Jodi Benson, Corey Burton, Dan Castellaneta, Cathy Cavadini, Cam Clarke, Anndi McAfee, Susan Silo, Francesca Marie Smith, Jill Talley, Redmond O'Neal, Marc Allen Lewis, Rick Logan, Susie Stevens-Logan, Ross Mapletoft, Jeff Robertson, Susan Boyd, Carmen Carter, Randy Crenshaw, Linda Harmon, Jon Joyce, Geoff Koch, Maxine Waters, Julia Waters, Terry Wood	
M A Y	20	Godzilla	TriStar Pictures / Centropolis Entertainment	Roland Emmerich (director/screenplay); Dean Devlin (screenplay); Matthew Broderick, Jean Reno, Maria Pitillo, Hank Azaria, Kevin Dunn, Michael Lerner, Harry Shearer, Arabella Field, Vicki Lewis, Doug Savant, Malcolm Danare, Robert Lesser, Ralph Manza, Chris Ellis, Nancy Cartwright, Richard E. Gant, Bodhi Elfman, Clyde Kusatsu, Masaya Kato, Glenn Morshower, Lola Pashalinski, Derek Webster, Stuart Fratkin, Kirk Geiger, Robert Floyd, Montae Russell, Mark Fite, Craig Castaldo, Lee Weaver, Leonard Termo, Al Sapienza, Frank Welker, Eugenie Bondurant, Kevin Grevioux, Al Leong, Patricia Tallman, Lance Reddick, Judy Reyes	
M A Y	22	Fear and Loathing in Las Vegas	Universal Pictures / Rhino Entertainment / Summit Entertainment	Terry Gilliam (director/screenplay); Tony Grisoni, Alex Cox, Tod Davies (screenplay); Johnny Depp, Benicio del Toro, Tobey Maguire, Ellen Barkin, Gary Busey, Christina Ricci, Mark Harmon, Cameron Diaz, Katherine Helmond, Michael Jeter, Craig Bierko, Lyle Lovett, Flea, Christopher Meloni, Harry Dean Stanton, Troy Evans, Debbie Reynolds, Jenette Goldstein, Verne Troyer, Gregory Itzin, Laraine Newman, Penn Jillette, Hunter S. Thompson, Larry Cedar, Tim Thomerson, Richard Riehle, Richard Portnow, Steve Schirripa, Larry Brandenburg, Jennifer Elise Cox, Kim Flowers, Tané McClure, Donald Morrow	
M A Y	22	The Opposite of Sex	Sony Pictures Classics	Don Roos (director/screenplay); Christina Ricci, Martin Donovan, Lisa Kudrow, Lyle Lovett, Johnny Galecki, Ivan Sergei, William Lee Scott, Colin Ferguson, Megan Blake, Dan Bucatinsky, Chauncey Leopardi, Rodney Eastman, Leslie Grossman	
M A Y	27	I Got the Hook-Up	Dimension Films	Michael Martin (director); Carrie Mungo, Leroy Douglas, Master P (screenplay); Master P, A.J. Johnson, Gretchen Palmer, Helen Martin, Ice Cube, C-Murder, John Witherspoon, Snoop Dogg, Tommy "Tiny" Lister Jr., Joe Estevez, Mia X, Fiend, Mr. Serv-On, Mystikal, Silkk the Shocker, Sheryl Underwood, Tangie Ambrose	
M A Y	29	Almost Heroes	Warner Bros. Pictures / Turner Pictures	Christopher Guest (director); Mark Nutter, Tom Wolfe, Boyd Hale (screenplay); Chris Farley, Matthew Perry, Eugene Levy, Kevin Dunn, Lisa Barbuscia, Bokeem Woodbine, David Packer, Hamilton Camp, Patrick Cranshaw, Steven M. Porter, Christian Clemenson, Franklin Cover, Jonathan Joss, George Aguilar, Lewis Arquette, Don Lake, John Farley, Tim DeKay, Brent Hinkley, David Barrera, Jay Lacopo, Frank Salsedo, Rusty Schwimmer, Harry Shearer	
M A Y	29	Hope Floats	20th Century Fox	Forest Whitaker (director); Steven Rogers (screenplay); Sandra Bullock, Harry Connick Jr., Gena Rowlands, Mae Whitman, Michael Paré, Cameron Finley, Kathy Najimy, Bill Cobbs, Connie Ray, Rosanna Arquette	
M A Y	29	Insomnia	First Run Features	Erik Skjoldbjærg (director/screenplay); Nikolaj Frobenius (screenplay); Stellan Skarsgård, Sverre Anker Ousdal, Bjørn Floberg, Gisken Armand, Maria Bonnevie	
M A Y	30	A Bright Shining Lie	HBO Pictures	Terry George (director/screenplay); Bill Paxton, Amy Madigan, Vivian Wu, Donal Logue, James Rebhorn, Kurtwood Smith, Ed Lauter, Harve Presnell, Kay Tong Lim, David Warshofsky, Robert John Burke, Richard Libertini, Eric Bogosian, Bo Eason, Robert Miranda, Walter Cronkite, Lyndon B. Johnson, Richard Nixon, Karina Logue, Seng Kawee, Van Thoa Trinh, James Bigwood, Les J.N. Mau, Thanh Nguyen, Pichariva Narakbunchaj, Kris von Habsburg, Matthew Ascherl, Simon Gaut, Jamie Watts	
M A Y	31	Thanks of a Grateful Nation	Showtime Networks / NBC / Adelson Entertainment / Tracey Alexander Productions	Rod Holcomb (director); John Sacret Young (screenplay); Ted Danson, Jennifer Jason Leigh, Brian Dennehy, Marg Helgenberger, Steven Weber, Matt Keeslar, Robin Gammell, Sabrina Grdevich, C. David Johnson, Cynthia Dale, Amy Carlson, Kenneth Welsh, Booth Savage, Bruce Gray, Hrant Alianak, Liisa Repo-Martell, Susan Coyne, Martha Burns, Richard Chevolleau, Janet Kidder, Robert Bockstael, Nicholas Campbell, Vincent Corazza, Karyn Dwyer, Hardee T. Lineham, Karl Pruner, Nigel Bennett, Tyrone Benskin, Kim Roberts, Carolyn Dunn, Victoria Snow, Andrew Miller, John Boylan, Panou	
J U N E	5	Beyond Silence	Miramax Films	Caroline Link (director/screenplay); Beth Serlin (screenplay); Sylvie Testud, Howie Seago, Emmanuelle Laborit, Sibylle Canonica, Matthias Habich, Alexandra Bolz, Birge Schade	
J U N E	5	A Perfect Murder	Warner Bros. Pictures	Andrew Davis (director); Patrick Smith Kelly (screenplay); Michael Douglas, Gwyneth Paltrow, Viggo Mortensen, David Suchet, Sarita Choudhury, Michael P. Moran, Novella Nelson, Constance Towers, David Eigenberg, Gerry Becker, Will Lyman	
J U N E	5	The Truman Show	Paramount Pictures	Peter Weir (director); Andrew Niccol (screenplay); Jim Carrey, Laura Linney, Noah Emmerich, Natascha McElhone, Holland Taylor, Ed Harris, Brian Delate, Paul Giamatti, Peter Krause, Heidi Schanz, Antoni Corone, Mario Ernesto Sanchez, John Roselius, Harry Shearer, Una Damon, Philip Baker Hall, John Pleshette, Philip Glass, O-Lan Jones, Terry Camilleri, Dona Hardy, Jeanette Miller, Joel McKinnon Miller, Marc Macaulay	
J U N E	12	Can't Hardly Wait	Columbia Pictures	Deborah Kaplan, Harry Elfont (directors/screenplay); Jennifer Love Hewitt, Ethan Embry, Charlie Korsmo, Lauren Ambrose, Peter Facinelli, Seth Green, Robert Jayne, Michelle Brookhurst, Joel Michaely, Jay Paulson, Chris Owen, Jason Segel, Clea DuVall, Jaime Pressly, Tamala Jones, Jennifer Lyons, Channon Roe, Sean Patrick Thomas, Freddy Rodriguez, Erik Palladino, Donald Faison, Paige Moss, Eric Balfour, Selma Blair, Jennifer Paz, Sara Rue, Nicole Bilderback, Leslie Grossman, Marisol Nichols, Vicellous Reon Shannon, Jenna Elfman, Jerry O'Connell, Melissa Joan Hart, Breckin Meyer, Deborah Kaplan, Harry Elfont, Amber Benson, Jennifer Elise Cox	
J U N E	12	Cousin Bette	Fox Searchlight Pictures	Des McAnuff (director); Lynne Siefert, Susan Tarr (screenplay); Jessica Lange, Elisabeth Shue, Hugh Laurie, Bob Hoskins, Geraldine Chaplin, Kelly Macdonald, Aden Young, Toby Jones, Laura Fraser	
J U N E	12	Dirty Work	Metro-Goldwyn-Mayer	Bob Saget (director); Frank Sebastiano, Norm Macdonald, Fred Wolf (screenplay); Norm Macdonald, Artie Lange, Jack Warden, Traylor Howard, Chris Farley, Christopher McDonald, Chevy Chase, Don Rickles, Rebecca Romijn, John Goodman, Adam Sandler, Gary Coleman, George Chuvalo, David Koechner, Jim Downey, Fred Wolf, Kevin Farley, Anthony J. Mifsud	
J U N E	12	High Art	October Films / Antidote Films	Lisa Cholodenko (director/screenplay); Ally Sheedy, Radha Mitchell, Gabriel Mann, Charis Michelsen, David Thornton, Anh Duong, Patricia Clarkson, Helen Mendes, Bill Sage, Tammy Grimes, Cindra Feuer, Anthony Ruivivar, Elaine Tse, Rudolf Martin	
J U N E	12	The Land Girls	PolyGram Filmed Entertainment / Intermedia Films / Channel Four Films / Canal+	David Leland (director/screenplay); Keith Dewhurst (screenplay); Catherine McCormack, Rachel Weisz, Anna Friel, Steven Mackintosh, Tom Georgeson, Maureen O'Brien, Lucy Akhurst, Paul Bettany	
J U N E	12	The Last Days of Disco	Gramercy Pictures / Castle Rock Entertainment / Westerly Films	Whit Stillman (director/screenplay); Chloë Sevigny, Kate Beckinsale, Chris Eigeman, Matt Keeslar, Mackenzie Astin, Matt Ross, Tara Subkoff, Burr Steers, David Thornton, Jaid Barrymore, Michael Weatherly, Robert Sean Leonard, Jennifer Beals, Mark McKinney, George Plimpton, Anthony Haden-Guest, Carolyn Farina, Taylor Nichols	
J U N E	12	Passion in the Desert	Fine Line Features	Lavinia Currier (director/screenplay); Ben Daniels, Michel Piccoli, Paul Meston, Nadia Odeh	
J U N E	12	Six Days, Seven Nights	Touchstone Pictures / Caravan Pictures / Northern Lights Entertainment / Roger Birnbaum Productions	Ivan Reitman (director); Michael Browning (screenplay); Harrison Ford, Anne Heche, David Schwimmer, Jacqueline Obradors, Temuera Morrison, Allison Janney, Cliff Curtis, Danny Trejo, Ben Bodé, Amy Sedaris, Kerry Rossall	
J U N E	19	Dream for an Insomniac	Avalanche Releasing	Tiffanie DeBartolo (director/screenplay); Ione Skye, Jennifer Aniston, Mackenzie Astin, Michael Landes, Seymour Cassel, Robert Kelker-Kelly	
J U N E	19	Hav Plenty	Miramax Films	Christopher Scott Cherot (director/screenplay); Christopher Scott Cherot, Chenoa Maxwell, Reginald James, Robinne Lee, Tammie Katherine Jones, Hill Harper, Betty Vaughn, Chuck Baron, Kim Harris, Margie St. Juste, Kenneth "Babyface" Edmonds, Lauryn Hill, Mekhi Phifer, Nia Long, Rozonda "Chilli" Thomas, Shemar Moore, Tracey Edmonds	
J U N E	19	Henry Fool	Sony Pictures Classics	Hal Hartley (director/screenplay); Thomas Jay Ryan, James Urbaniak, Parker Posey, Liam Aiken, Maria Porter, James Saito, Kevin Corrigan, Camille Paglia, Nicholas Hope, Toy Connor	
J U N E	19	Mulan	Walt Disney Pictures	Barry Cook, Tony Bancroft (directors); Philip LaZebnik, Chris Sanders, Rita Hsiao, Eugenia Bostwick-Singer, Raymond Singer (screenplay); Ming-Na Wen, Eddie Murphy, B.D. Wong, Miguel Ferrer, Harvey Fierstein, Gedde Watanabe, Jerry Tondo, June Foray, James Hong, George Takei, Pat Morita, Soon-Tek Oh, Miriam Margolyes, Freda Foh Shen, James Shigeta, Lea Salonga, Donny Osmond, Marni Nixon, Matthew Wilder, Frank Welker, Chris Sanders, Mary Kay Bergman, Julianne Buescher, Steve Bulen, Rodger Bumpass, Corey Burton, Robert Clotworthy, Sally Dworsky, Beth Fowler, Donald Fullilove, Elisa Gabrielli, Jack Gilpin, Richard Steven Horvitz, Matthew Labyorteaux, Conan Lee, Luisa Leschin, Edie Mirman, Mark Moseley, Patrick Pinney, Peter Renaday, Jeff Bennett, Claudette Wells	
J U N E	19	The X-Files	20th Century Fox	Rob Bowman (director); Chris Carter (screenplay); David Duchovny, Gillian Anderson, Martin Landau, Blythe Danner, Armin Mueller-Stahl, Mitch Pileggi, William B. Davis, John Neville, Dean Haglund, Bruce Harwood, Tom Braidwood, Jeffrey DeMunn, Jason Beghe, Michael Shamus Wiles, Terry O'Quinn, Lucas Black, Gary Grubbs, Nick Lashaway, Glenne Headly	
J U N E	24	I Went Down	BBC Films	Paddy Breathnach (director); Conor McPherson (screenplay); Peter McDonald, Brendan Gleeson, Tony Doyle, Peter Caffrey, Antoine Byrne, David Wilmot, Carly Baker, Michael McElhatton, Joe Gallagher	
J U N E	26	Buffalo '66	Lions Gate Films / Cinépix Film Properties	Vincent Gallo (director/screenplay); Alison Bagnall (screenplay); Vincent Gallo, Christina Ricci, Ben Gazzara, Mickey Rourke, Rosanna Arquette, Jan-Michael Vincent, Anjelica Huston, Kevin Corrigan, Kevin Pollak, Alex Karras, John Rummel, Bob Wahl	
J U N E	26	Dr. Dolittle	20th Century Fox / Davis Entertainment	Betty Thomas (director); Hugh Lofting, Nat Mauldin, Larry Levin (screenplay); Eddie Murphy, Ossie Davis, Oliver Platt, Peter Boyle, Kristen Wilson, Norm Macdonald, Kyla Pratt, Raven-Symoné, Richard Schiff, Jeffrey Tambor, Royce D. Applegate, Albert Brooks, Hamilton Camp, Ellen DeGeneres, Jeff Doucette, Brian Doyle-Murray, Jenna Elfman, Eddie Frierson, Gilbert Gottfried, Archie Hahn, Julie Kavner, John Leguizamo, Jonathan Lipnicki, Kerrigan Mahan, Phil Proctor, Paul Reubens, Chris Rock, Reni Santoni, Garry Shandling, Tom Towles, Jim Dean, Chad Einbinder, Phyllis Katz	
J U N E	26	Out of Sight	Universal Pictures / Jersey Films	Steven Soderbergh (director); Scott Frank (screenplay); George Clooney, Jennifer Lopez, Ving Rhames, Don Cheadle, Steve Zahn, Albert Brooks, Dennis Farina, Luis Guzmán, Isaiah Washington, Nancy Allen, Keith Loneker, Catherine Keener, Viola Davis, Paul Calderón, Wendell B. Harris Jr., Paul Soileau, Connie Sawyer, Phil Perlman, Wayne Pére, Joe Chrest, Samuel L. Jackson, Michael Keaton	
J U N E	26	Smoke Signals	Miramax Films / ShadowCatcher Entertainment	Chris Eyre (director); Sherman Alexie (screenplay); Adam Beach, Evan Adams, Irene Bedard, Gary Farmer, Tantoo Cardinal	
J U N E	27	When Trumpets Fade	HBO NYC Productions	John Irvin (director); W.W. Vought (screenplay); Ron Eldard, Zak Orth, Frank Whaley, Dylan Bruno, Devon Gummersall, Dan Futterman, Steven Petrarca, Dwight Yoakam, Martin Donovan, Timothy Olyphant, Jeffrey Donovan, Bobby Cannavale, Frank-Michael Köbe, Peter Thomas, Omar N. Bradley, Pierre Koenig, Bernard L. Montgomery	

== July–September ==
Opening		Title	Production company	Cast and crew	Ref.
J U L Y	1	Armageddon	Touchstone Pictures / Jerry Bruckheimer Films / Valhalla Motion Pictures	Michael Bay (director); Tony Gilroy, Shane Salerno, Jonathan Hensleigh, J. J. Abrams (screenplay); Bruce Willis, Billy Bob Thornton, Ben Affleck, Liv Tyler, Will Patton, Steve Buscemi, William Fichtner, Owen Wilson, Michael Clarke Duncan, Peter Stormare, Ken Hudson Campbell, Jessica Steen, Keith David, Chris Ellis, Jason Isaacs, Grayson McCouch, Marshall Teague, Anthony Guidera, Greg Collins, Ian Quinn, Grace Zabriskie, Eddie Griffin, Jim Ishida, Stanley Anderson, James Harper, Ellen Cleghorne, Udo Kier, John Aylward, Mark Curry, Seiko Matsuda, Harry Humphries, Dyllan Christopher, Judith Hoag, Steven Ford, Christian Clemenson, Michael Taliferro, Shawnee Smith, Bodhi Elfman, Peter White, Frederick Weller, Jeff Austin, Matt Malloy, Peter Murnik, Andy Milder, Michael Kaplan, Jim Fitzpatrick, Charlton Heston, Mark Boone Junior, Erik Per Sullivan, Lawrence Tierney, Gedde Watanabe, Michael Bay	
J U L Y	10	Hands on a Hard Body: The Documentary	Ideal Enterprises / Providence Entertainment	S.R. Bindler (director)	
J U L Y	10	Lethal Weapon 4	Warner Bros. Pictures / Silver Pictures	Richard Donner (director); Channing Gibson (screenplay); Mel Gibson, Danny Glover, Joe Pesci, Rene Russo, Chris Rock, Jet Li, Kim Chan, Steve Kahan, Calvin Jung, Jack Kehler, Eddy Ko, Mary Ellen Trainor, Conan Lee, Darlene Love, Traci Wolfe, Damon Hines, Ebonie Smith, Michael Chow, Richard Riehle, Roger Yuan, Jeff Imada, James Lew, François Chau, Roland Kickinger, Benjamin King, Al Sapienza, Jeanne Chinn, Ray Chang, George Kee Cheung, Marian Collier, Barret Swatek, Rick Hoffman, Bill Henderson, Stephen Blackehart, Al Leong, Richard Libertini, Jerome Elston Scott	
J U L Y	10	Madeline	TriStar Pictures	Daisy von Scherler Mayer (director); Mark Levin, Jennifer Flackett (screenplay); Frances McDormand, Nigel Hawthorne, Hatty Jones, Stéphane Audran, Chantal Neuwirth, Ben Daniels, Kristian De La Osa, Clare Thomas, Bianca Strohmann, Rachel Dennis, Eloise Eonnet, Morgane Farcat, Pilar Garrard, Emilie Jessula, Alice Lavaud, Christina Mangani, Jessica Mason, Alix Ponchon, Arturo Venegas, Katia Caballero, Katia Tchenko, Emil Abossolo-Mbo, Julien Maurel, George Harris	
J U L Y	10	Pi	Artisan Entertainment / Protozoa Pictures	Darren Aronofsky (director/screenplay); Sean Gullette, Mark Margolis, Ben Shenkman, Samia Shoaib, Ajay Naidu, Pamela Hart, Stephen Pearlman, Kristyn Mae-Anne Lao, Lauren Fox, Clint Mansell	
J U L Y	10	Small Soldiers	DreamWorks / Universal Pictures / Amblin Entertainment	Joe Dante (director); Gavin Scott, Adam Rifkin, Ted Elliott, Terry Rossio (screenplay); Gregory Smith, Kirsten Dunst, Jay Mohr, Phil Hartman, Kevin Dunn, Ann Magnuson, Denis Leary, David Cross, Wendy Schaal, Jacob Smith, Alexandra Wilson, Dick Miller, Robert Picardo, Jonathan Bouck, Belinda Balaski, Rance Howard, Jackie Joseph, Archie Hahn, Tommy Lee Jones, Frank Langella, George Kennedy, Jim Brown, Ernest Borgnine, Clint Walker, Bruce Dern, Christopher Guest, Michael McKean, Harry Shearer, Jim Cummings, Sarah Michelle Gellar, Christina Ricci	
J U L Y	14	Dennis the Menace Strikes Again	Warner Home Video / Outlaw Productions / Hank Ketcham Enterprises / Warner Bros. Family Entertainment	Charles T. Kanganis (director); Tim McCanlies, Jeff Schechter (screenplay); Justin Cooper, Don Rickles, Betty White, George Kennedy, Brian Doyle-Murray, Carrot Top, Dwier Brown, Heidi Swedberg, Alexa Vega, Brooke Candy, Keith Reece, Jacqueline Steiger, Danny Turner	
J U L Y	15	There's Something About Mary	20th Century Fox	Peter Farrelly, Bobby Farrelly (directors/screenplay); Ed Decter, John J. Strauss (screenplay); Cameron Diaz, Matt Dillon, Ben Stiller, Lee Evans, Chris Elliott, Lin Shaye, Jeffrey Tambor, Markie Post, Keith David, W. Earl Brown, Sarah Silverman, Khandi Alexander, Danny Murphy, Richard Tyson, Rob Moran, Willie Garson, Brett Favre, Steve Sweeney, Jonathan Richman, Lenny Clarke, Zen Gesner, Scott Rosenberg, Richard Jenkins, Harland Williams	
J U L Y	17	The Mask of Zorro	TriStar Pictures / Amblin Entertainment	Martin Campbell (director); John Eskow, Ted Elliott, Terry Rossio (screenplay); Antonio Banderas, Anthony Hopkins, Catherine Zeta-Jones, Stuart Wilson, Matt Letscher, Tony Amendola, Pedro Armendáriz Jr., Victor Rivers, William Marquez, L. Q. Jones, Julieta Rosen, Maury Chaykin	
J U L Y	17	Polish Wedding	Fox Searchlight Pictures / Lakeshore Entertainment	Theresa Connelly (director/screenplay); Lena Olin, Gabriel Byrne, Claire Danes, Adam Trese, Mili Avital, Daniel Lapaine, Rade Serbedzija, Jon Bradford, Ramsey Krull, Rachel and Rebecca Morrin, Steven Petrarca, Brian Hoyt, Christina Romana Lypeckyj, Peter Carey, Kristen Bell	
J U L Y	22	Lolita	The Samuel Goldwyn Company / Pathé	Adrian Lyne (director); Stephen Schiff (screenplay); Jeremy Irons, Melanie Griffith, Dominique Swain, Frank Langella, Suzanne Shepherd, Keith Reddin, Erin J. Dean, Joan Glover, Ed Grady, Michael Goodwin, Angela Paton, Emma Griffiths Malin, Ronald Pickup, Michael Culkin, Annabelle Apsion	
J U L Y	24	Billy's Hollywood Screen Kiss	Trimark Pictures	Tommy O'Haver (director/screenplay); Sean P. Hayes, Brad Rowe, Richard Ganoung, Meredith Scott Lynn, Matthew Ashford, Armando Valdes-Kennedy, Paul Bartel, Holly Woodlawn, Christopher Bradley, Robbie Cain, Carmine D. Giovinazzo, Les Borsay, Jason-Shane Scott	
J U L Y	24	Disturbing Behavior	Metro-Goldwyn-Mayer / Village Roadshow Pictures / Beacon Pictures	David Nutter (director); Scott Rosenberg (screenplay); James Marsden, Katie Holmes, Nick Stahl, Bruce Greenwood, William Sadler, Steve Railsback, Chad E. Donella, Tobias Mehler, Tygh Runyan, Katharine Isabelle, Ethan Embry, Terry David Mulligan, Susan Logan, Lynda Boyd, Jay Brazeau, A. J. Buckley, David Paetkau, Daniella Evangelista, Peter LaCroix, Crystal Cass, Derek Hamilton, Julie Patzwald	
J U L Y	24	Mafia!	Touchstone Pictures	Jim Abrahams (director/screenplay); Greg Norberg, Michael McManus (screenplay); Jay Mohr, Lloyd Bridges, Christina Applegate, Billy Burke, Pamela Gidley, Olympia Dukakis, Joe Viterelli, Tony Lo Bianco, Phil Suriano, Vincent Pastore, Marisol Nichols, Carol Ann Susi, Gregory Sierra, Louis Mandylor, Jason Fuchs, Sofia Milos, Jason Davis, Seth Adkins, Andreas Katsulas, Stefan Lysenko, Anthony Crivello, Jerry Haleva, Catherine Lloyd Burns, Larry Laverty, Deep Roy, Don Cornelius, Sherman Hemsley, Isabel Sanford, Florence Griffith Joyner, Alex Trebek, Frank Welker, Blake Hammond, Steve Kruth	
J U L Y	24	Saving Private Ryan	DreamWorks / Paramount Pictures / Amblin Entertainment / Mutual Film Company	Steven Spielberg (director); Robert Rodat (screenplay); Tom Hanks, Edward Burns, Matt Damon, Tom Sizemore, Barry Pepper, Adam Goldberg, Vin Diesel, Giovanni Ribisi, Jeremy Davies, Harrison Young, Kathleen Byron, Ted Danson, Paul Giamatti, Dennis Farina, Harve Presnell, Leland Orser, Bryan Cranston, Nathan Fillion, Max Martini, Amanda Boxer, Joerg Stadler, Ryan Hurst, Andrew Scott, Dale Dye, Rolf Saxon, Dylan Bruno, Corey Johnson, Demetri Goritsas, John Sharian, Stéphane Cornicard, Michelle Evans	
J U L Y	25	Poodle Springs	HBO Pictures	Bob Rafelson (director); Tom Stoppard (screenplay); James Caan, Dina Meyer, David Keith, Tom Bower, Julia Campbell, Brian Cox, Nia Peeples, Joe Don Baker, Royce D. Applegate, Billy Beck, Gary Bullock, Eric Da Re, Thomas F. Duffy, Mo Gallini, Rene L. Moreno, Julianna McCarthy, Brad Stine, Greg Travis, Robert Wightman, Tom Stoppard	
J U L Y	29	The Negotiator	Warner Bros. Pictures / Regency Enterprises / Mandeville Films	F. Gary Gray (director); James DeMonaco, Kevin Fox (screenplay); Samuel L. Jackson, Kevin Spacey, David Morse, Ron Rifkin, John Spencer, J. T. Walsh, Siobhan Fallon Hogan, Paul Giamatti, Regina Taylor, Bruce Beatty, Michael Cudlitz, Carlos Gomez, Tim Kelleher, Dean Norris, Nestor Serrano, Doug Spinuzza, Leonard Thomas, Stephen Lee, Paul Guilfoyle	
J U L Y	29	The Parent Trap	Walt Disney Pictures	Nancy Meyers (director/screenplay); David Swift, Charles Shyer (screenplay); Lindsay Lohan, Dennis Quaid, Natasha Richardson, Elaine Hendrix, Lisa Ann Walter, Simon Kunz, Polly Holliday, Maggie Wheeler, Ronnie Stevens, Joanna Barnes, Hallie Meyers-Shyer, Katerina Graham, John Atterbury, Dina Lohan, Aliana Lohan, Maggie Emma Thomas, Courtney Woods, Alexander Cole, J. Patrick McCormack, Michael Lohan, Cody Lohan	
J U L Y	31	BASEketball	Universal Pictures / Zucker Brothers Productions	David Zucker (director/screenplay); Robert LoCash, Lewis Friedman, Jeff Wright (screenplay); Trey Parker, Matt Stone, Dian Bachar, Yasmine Bleeth, Jenny McCarthy, Ernest Borgnine, Robert Vaughn, Trevor Einhorn, Bob Costas, Al Michaels, Robert Stack, Reggie Jackson, Dan Patrick, Kenny Mayne, Tim McCarver, Pat O'Brien, Jim Lampley, Dale Earnhardt, Kareem Abdul-Jabbar, Victoria Silvstedt, Reel Big Fish, Curt Gowdy, Justin Chapman, Matt Murray, Matt Sloan, Peter "Navy" Tuiasosopo, Greg Grunberg, Paul Michael Robinson, Kevin Michael Richardson, Francis X. McCarthy, Richard Johnson, Joey "CoCo" Diaz, Jill Gascoine, Charlotte Zucker, John Fink, Kato Kaelin, Iqbal Theba, Stephen McHattie, Kelly Monaco, Raphael Sbarge, Jeffrey Weissman, David Zucker, Mike Schmidt, Patrick McCracken	
J U L Y	31	Ever After	20th Century Fox	Andy Tennant (director/screenplay); Susannah Grant, Tracey Trench (producer/screenplay); Drew Barrymore, Anjelica Huston, Dougray Scott, Patrick Godfrey, Megan Dodds, Melanie Lynskey, Timothy West, Judy Parfitt, Jeroen Krabbé, Lee Ingleby, Matyelok Gibbs, Walter Sparrow, Jeanne Moreau, Richard O'Brien, Peter Gunn, Toby Jones, Janet Henfrey, Amanda Walker, Kate Lansbury, Joerg Stadler, Andrew Henderson, Anna Maguire, Elizabeth Earl, Alex Pooley, Ricki Cuttell	
J U L Y	31	Full Tilt Boogie	Miramax Films	Sarah Kelly (director); Robert Rodriguez, Quentin Tarantino, Lawrence Bender, George Clooney, Harvey Keitel, Juliette Lewis, Salma Hayek, Fred Williamson, Tom Savini, Michael Parks, Elizabeth Avellan, Robert Kurtzman, Gregory Nicotero	
A U G U S T	5	Halloween H20: 20 Years Later	Miramax Films / Dimension Films	Steve Miner (director); Robert Zappia, Matt Greenberg (screenplay); Jamie Lee Curtis, Adam Arkin, Michelle Williams, Adam Hann-Byrd, Jodi Lyn O'Keefe, Janet Leigh, Josh Hartnett, LL Cool J, Joseph Gordon-Levitt, Chris Durand, Nancy Stephens, LisaGay Hamilton, Matt Winston, Beau Billingslea, Branden Williams, Tom Kane	
A U G U S T	7	Snake Eyes	Paramount Pictures / Touchstone Pictures	Brian De Palma (director); David Koepp (screenplay); Nicolas Cage, Gary Sinise, Carla Gugino, John Heard, Joel Fabiani, Luis Guzmán, Stan Shaw, Kevin Dunn, Michael Rispoli, David Anthony Higgins, Mike Starr, Peter McRobbie, Tamara Tunie, Chip Zien, Jayne Heitmeyer	
A U G U S T	14	Air Bud: Golden Receiver	Dimension Films / Keystone Entertainment	Richard Martin (director); Paul Tamasy, Aaron Mendelsohn (screenplay); Kevin Zegers, Gregory Harrison, Cynthia Stevenson, Nora Dunn, Perry Anzilotti, Robert Costanzo, Tim Conway, Dick Martin, Warren Moon, Joey Galloway, Shayn Solberg, Suzanne Ristic, Alyson MacLaren	
A U G U S T	14	The Avengers	Warner Bros. Pictures / Jerry Weintraub Productions	Jeremiah S. Chechik (director); Don Macpherson (screenplay); Ralph Fiennes, Uma Thurman, Sean Connery, Jim Broadbent, Fiona Shaw, Eddie Izzard, Eileen Atkins, John Wood, Carmen Ejogo, Keeley Hawes, Patrick Macnee, Shaun Ryder, Nicholas Woodeson, Richard Lumsden, Nadim Sawalha, Christopher Godwin, Roger Lloyd-Pack	
A U G U S T	14	How Stella Got Her Groove Back	20th Century Fox	Kevin Rodney Sullivan (director); Terry McMillan, Ronald Bass (screenplay); Angela Bassett, Taye Diggs, Whoopi Goldberg, Regina King, Suzzanne Douglas, Michael J. Pagan, Sicily, Richard Lawson, Barry Shabaka Henley, Lee Weaver, Glynn Turman, Phyllis Yvonne Stickney, Denise Hunt, Lisa Hanna, James Pickens Jr., Philip Casnoff, Lou Myers, Art Metrano, Carl Lumbly, Phina Oruche, Victor Garber	
A U G U S T	14	Return to Paradise	PolyGram Filmed Entertainment	Joseph Ruben (director); Wesley Strick, Bruce Robinson (screenplay); Vince Vaughn, Anne Heche, Joaquin Phoenix, David Conrad, Vera Farmiga, Nick Sandow, Jada Pinkett Smith, Ming Lee, Joel de la Fuente, Brette Taylor, David Zayas, Elizabeth Rodriguez, Raymond J. Barry	
A U G U S T	14	Slums of Beverly Hills	Fox Searchlight Pictures	Tamara Jenkins (director/screenplay); Alan Arkin, Marisa Tomei, Natasha Lyonne, Kevin Corrigan, Jessica Walter, Rita Moreno, David Krumholtz, Eli Marienthal, Carl Reiner, Mena Suvari, Charlotte Stewart, Jay Patterson	
A U G U S T	18	Magdalen	ARM/Cinema 25	Andrew Repasky McElhinney (director), Alix D. Smith, David Semonin, Moria Rankin	
A U G U S T	21	Blade	New Line Cinema / Marvel Enterprises	Stephen Norrington (director); David S. Goyer (screenplay); Wesley Snipes, Stephen Dorff, Kris Kristofferson, N'Bushe Wright, Donal Logue, Udo Kier, Arly Jover, Traci Lords, Kevin Patrick Walls, Tim Guinee, Sanaa Lathan, Eric Edwards, Shannon Lee, Kenneth Johnson, Judson Scott, Sidney Liufau, Keith Leon Williams, John Enos III, Lyle Conway, Matt Schulze, Lennox Brown, Jenya Lano, Steven Ho, Jeff Imada, Diana Lee Inosanto, Ted King, Henry Kingi, Stephen Norrington, Gerald Okamura, Simon Rhee, Michael Stumpf, Jen Taylor	
A U G U S T	21	Dance with Me	Columbia Pictures / Mandalay Entertainment	Randa Haines (director); Darryl Matthews (screenplay); Vanessa L. Williams, Chayanne, Kris Kristofferson, Joan Plowright, Jane Krakowski, Beth Grant, Harry Groener, Mike Gomez, Tony Meredith, Melanie LaPatin, Jean-Marc Généreux, France Mousseau, Jaana Kunitz, J.E. Freeman, Connie Ray, Albita Rodríguez, William Marquez, Scott Paetty, Rick Valenzuela, Chaz Oswill, Liz Curtis, Bill Applebaum, Victor Marcel, Ana Sofia Pomales	
A U G U S T	21	Dead Man on Campus	Paramount Pictures / MTV Productions / Pacific Western Productions	Alan Cohn (director); Michael Traeger, Mike White (screenplay); Mark-Paul Gosselaar, Tom Everett Scott, Poppy Montgomery, Lochlyn Munro, Corey Page, Alyson Hannigan, Shelley Malil, Mari Morrow, Dave Ruby, Jason Segel, Linda Cardellini, Randy Pearlstein, Aeryk Egan, Mark Carapezza, Jeff T.	
A U G U S T	21	Next Stop Wonderland	Miramax Films	Brad Anderson (director/screenplay); Lyn Vaus (screenplay); Hope Davis, Alan Gelfant, Victor Argo, H. Jon Benjamin, Cara Buono, Larry Gilliard Jr., Philip Seymour Hoffman, Jason Lewis, Roger Rees, Sam Seder, José Zúñiga, Callie Thorne, Holland Taylor, Robert Klein	
A U G U S T	21	Wrongfully Accused	Warner Bros. Pictures / Morgan Creek Productions	Pat Proft (director/screenplay); Leslie Nielsen, Richard Crenna, Kelly LeBrock, Melinda McGraw, Michael York, Sandra Bernhard, Aaron Pearl, Leslie Jones, Ben Ratner, Gerard Plunkett, Duncan Fraser	
A U G U S T	21	Your Friends & Neighbors	Gramercy Pictures	Neil LaBute (director/screenplay); Amy Brenneman, Aaron Eckhart, Catherine Keener, Nastassja Kinski, Jason Patric, Ben Stiller	
A U G U S T	22	The Rat Pack	HBO Pictures	Rob Cohen (director); Kario Salem (screenplay); Ray Liotta, Joe Mantegna, Don Cheadle, Angus Macfadyen, William L. Petersen, Željko Ivanek, Bobby Slayton, Megan Dodds, Deborah Kara Unger, Veronica Cartwright, Dan O'Herlihy, Robert Miranda, Barbara Niven, Tyrees Allen, John Diehl, David Andrews, Todd Susman, Dey Young, Tom Dreesen, Craig Richard Nelson, Joel McKinnon Miller, Amber Smith, Mary Cadorette, Ron Ostrow, Scott MacDonald, Joe Cortese, Greg Berg, Fidel Castro	
A U G U S T	25	Pocahontas II: Journey to a New World	Walt Disney Home Video	Tom Ellery, Bradley Raymond (directors); Allen Estrin, Cindy Marcus, Flip Kobler (screenplay); Irene Bedard, Billy Zane, Donal Gibson, David Ogden Stiers, John Kassir, Russell Means, Frank Welker, Linda Hunt, Danny Mann, Michelle St. John, Jim Cummings, Finola Hughes, Jean Stapleton, Brad Garrett, Judy Kuhn, Jeff Bennett, Rob Paulsen, Gregg Rainwater, W. Morgan Sheppard, Kath Soucie, April Winchell, Bob Bergen, Rodger Bumpass, Jennifer Darling, Debi Derryberry, Paul Eiding, Bill Farmer, Jonathan Joss, Georgina Lightning, Phil Proctor	
A U G U S T	28	54	Miramax Films	Mark Christopher (director/screenplay); Ryan Phillippe, Salma Hayek, Neve Campbell, Mike Myers, Sela Ward, Breckin Meyer, Sherry Stringfield, Cameron Mathison, Heather Matarazzo, Skipp Sudduth, Mark Ruffalo, Lauren Hutton, Michael York, Ellen Albertini Dow, Peter Bogdanovich, Cindy Crawford, Sheryl Crow, Elio Fiorucci, Bruce Jay Friedman, Art Garfunkel, Georgina Grenville, Thelma Houston, Ron Jeremy, Beverly Johnson, Heidi Klum, Lorna Luft, Valerie Perrine, Stars on 54, Cecilie Thomsen, Donald Trump, Frederique van der Wal, Veronica Webb, Sylvester Stallone	
A U G U S T	28	Why Do Fools Fall in Love	Warner Bros. Pictures	Gregory Nava (director); Tina Andrews (screenplay); Halle Berry, Vivica A. Fox, Lela Rochon, Larenz Tate, Paul Mazursky, Pamela Reed, Alexis Cruz, Jon Huertas, David Barry Gray, Miguel A. Nunez Jr., Clifton Powell, Lane Smith, Ben Vereen, Paula Jai Parker, Marcello Thedford, Norris Young, Little Richard, Aries Spears, J. August Richards, Craig Kirkwood, Mary-Pat Green, Yorgo Constantine, Shirley Caesar	
S E P T E M B E R	4	Knock Off	TriStar Pictures / Film Workshop	Tsui Hark (director); Steven E. de Souza (screenplay); Jean-Claude Van Damme, Rob Schneider, Lela Rochon, Michael Wong, Carman Lee, Paul Sorvino, Wyman Wong, Glen Chin, Moses Chan, Mike Ian Lambert, Wes Wolff	
S E P T E M B E R	11	Cube	Trimark Pictures	Vincenzo Natali (director/screenplay); Andre Bijelic, Graeme Manson (screenplay); Nicole de Boer, Nicky Guadagni, David Hewlett, Andrew Miller, Julian Richings, Wayne Robson, Maurice Dean Wint	
S E P T E M B E R	11	Rounders	Miramax Films	John Dahl (director); David Levien, Brian Koppelman (screenplay); Matt Damon, Edward Norton, John Turturro, Famke Janssen, Gretchen Mol, John Malkovich, Martin Landau, Michael Rispoli, Melina Kanakaredes, Josh Mostel, Tom Aldredge, Lenny Clarke, Chris Messina, Goran Višnjić, David Zayas, Johnny Chan, Bill Camp, Josh Pais, Adam LeFevre, Paul Cicero	
S E P T E M B E R	11	Simon Birch	Hollywood Pictures / Caravan Pictures / Roger Birnbaum Productions	Mark Steven Johnson (director/screenplay); Ian Michael Smith, Joseph Mazzello, Jim Carrey, Ashley Judd, Oliver Platt, David Strathairn, Dana Ivey, Beatrice Winde, Jan Hooks, Peter MacNeill, Cecilley Carroll, Sumela-Rose Keramidopulos, Sam Morton, John Mazzello, Holly Dennison	
S E P T E M B E R	11	Without Limits	Warner Bros. Pictures	Robert Towne (director/screenplay); Kenny Moore (screenplay); Billy Crudup, Donald Sutherland, Monica Potter, Jeremy Sisto, Judith Ivey, Dean Norris, Billy Burke, Frank Shorter, Matthew Lillard, William Mapother	
S E P T E M B E R	16	Permanent Midnight	Artisan Entertainment	David Veloz (director/screenplay); Ben Stiller, Elizabeth Hurley, Maria Bello, Owen Wilson, Cheryl Ladd, Peter Greene, Janeane Garofalo, Lourdes Benedicto, Fred Willard, Connie Nielsen, Liz Torres, Sandra Oh, Jerry Stahl, Andy Dick	
S E P T E M B E R	18	Chicago Cab	Castle Hill Productions	Mary Cybulski, John Tintori (director); Will Kern (screenplay); Paul Dillon, Michael Ironside, Laurie Metcalf, John C. Reilly, Gillian Anderson, John Cusack, Julianne Moore, Matt Roth, Harry Lennix, Kevin J. O'Connor, Michael Shannon, Andrew Rothenberg, Tracy Letts, Hubert Taczanowski, Reggie Hayes	
S E P T E M B E R	18	One True Thing	Universal Pictures	Carl Franklin (director); Karen Croner (screenplay); Meryl Streep, Renée Zellweger, William Hurt, Tom Everett Scott, Lauren Graham, Nicky Katt, James Eckhouse, Patrick Breen	
S E P T E M B E R	18	A Soldier's Daughter Never Cries	October Films	James Ivory (director); Ruth Prawer Jhabvala (screenplay); Kris Kristofferson, Barbara Hershey, Leelee Sobieski, Jesse Bradford, Jane Birkin, Dominique Blanc, Harley Cross, Isaach de Bankolé, Macha Méril, Nathalie Richard, Anthony Roth Costanzo, Bob Swaim, Virginie Ledoyen	
S E P T E M B E R	18	Rush Hour	New Line Cinema / Roger Birnbaum Productions	Brett Ratner (director); Jim Kouf, Ross LaManna (screenplay); Jackie Chan, Chris Tucker, Tom Wilkinson, Chris Penn, Elizabeth Peña, Philip Baker Hall, Tzi Ma, Ken Leung, Mark Rolston, Rex Linn, Julia Hsu, John Hawkes, Clifton Powell, Barry Shabaka Henley, George Cheung, Jason Davis, James Lew, Michael Chow, Larry Sullivan, Roger Fan, Gene LeBell, Manny Perry, Stanley DeSantis, Dan Martin, Ken Lo, Andy Cheng, Christine Ng, Frances Fong, Stephen Blackehart, Norman D. Wilson	
S E P T E M B E R	22	Addams Family Reunion	Warner Home Video / Saban Entertainment	Dave Payne (director); Rob Kerchner, Scott Sandin (screenplay); Daryl Hannah, Tim Curry, Nicole Fugere, Jerry Messing, Patrick Thomas, Carel Struycken, Christopher Hart, Kevin McCarthy, Estelle Harris, Alice Ghostley, Phil Fondacaro, Ed Begley Jr., Ray Walston, Diane Delano, Heidi Noelle Lenhart, Hilary Shepard Turner, Rodger Halston, Haylie Duff, Logan Robbins, Lindsey Haun, Clint Howard, Joel Ross, Leigh Taylor-Young	
S E P T E M B E R	22	Casper Meets Wendy	20th Century Fox Home Entertainment / The Harvey Entertainment Company / Saban Entertainment / Brookwell McNamara Entertainment	Sean McNamara (director); Jymn Magon (screenplay); Hilary Duff, Cathy Moriarty, Shelley Duvall, Teri Garr, George Hamilton, Richard Moll, Vincent Schiavelli, Pauly Shore, Blake Foster, Jeremy Foley, Jim Ward, Bill Farmer, Jess Harnell, Logan Robbins, Michael McDonald, Patrick Richwood, Travis McKenna, Rodger Halston, Alan Thicke, Bob Saget, Casper Van Dien, Billy Burnette, Maria Ford, Jim Wise, Patricia Elliott, Rodman Flender, Elizabeth Gage, Larry Robbins	
S E P T E M B E R	22	Scooby-Doo on Zombie Island	Warner Home Video	Jim Stenstrum (director); Glenn Leopold (screenplay); Scott Innes, Billy West, Mary Kay Bergman, Frank Welker, B.J. Ward, Adrienne Barbeau, Tara Strong, Cam Clarke, Jim Cummings, Mark Hamill, Jennifer Leigh Warren, Ed Gilbert, Jack Angel	
S E P T E M B E R	25	Clay Pigeons	Gramercy Pictures / Scott Free Productions	David Dobkin (director); Matt Healy (screenplay); Joaquin Phoenix, Vince Vaughn, Janeane Garofalo, Georgina Cates, Gregory Sporleder, Phil Morris, Scott Wilson, Vince Vieluf, Kevin Rahm, Joseph D. Reitman, Nikki Arlyn	
S E P T E M B E R	25	Monument Ave.	Miramax Films	Ted Demme (director); Mike Armstrong (screenplay); Denis Leary, Colm Meaney, Famke Janssen, Martin Sheen, Jeanne Tripplehorn, Billy Crudup, Ian Hart, Lyndon Byers, Jason Barry, John Diehl, Greg Dulli, Lenny Clarke, Noah Emmerich	
S E P T E M B E R	25	Pecker	Fine Line Features	John Waters (director/screenplay); Edward Furlong, Christina Ricci, Bess Armstrong, Mary Kay Place, Martha Plimpton, Brendan Sexton III, Lili Taylor, Angela Calo, Lauren Hulsey, Mark Joy, Mink Stole, Patricia Hearst, Jean Schertler, Alan J. Wendl, Greg Gorman, Cindy Sherman, Mary Vivian Pearce, Anthony Roger, Doug Roberts, Patsy Grady Adams, Susan Greenhill, John Waters, Stacy Keibler, Brian Thomas	
S E P T E M B E R	25	Ronin	Metro-Goldwyn-Mayer / United Artists	John Frankenheimer (director); J. D. Zeik, David Mamet (screenplay); Robert De Niro, Jean Reno, Natascha McElhone, Stellan Skarsgård, Sean Bean, Jonathan Pryce, Skipp Sudduth, Michael Lonsdale, Jan Tříska, Katarina Witt, Féodor Atkine	
S E P T E M B E R	25	Urban Legend	TriStar Pictures / Original Film / Phoenix Pictures	Jamie Blanks (director); Silvio Horta (screenplay); Jared Leto, Alicia Witt, Rebecca Gayheart, Michael Rosenbaum, Loretta Devine, Joshua Jackson, Tara Reid, John Neville, Julian Richings, Robert Englund, Danielle Harris, Natasha Gregson Wagner, Gord Martineau, Kay Hawtrey, Angela Vint, Vince Corazza, Stephanie Mills, Danny Comden, Cle Bennett, Brad Dourif, Silvio Horta	
S E P T E M B E R	29	The Jungle Book: Mowgli's Story	Buena Vista Home Entertainment	Nick Marck (director); José Rivera, Jim Herzfeld (screenplay); Brandon Baker, Brian Doyle-Murray, Eartha Kitt, Clancy Brown, Peri Gilpin, Sherman Howard, Marty Ingels, Stephen Tobolowsky, Kathy Najimy, Dee Bradley Baker, Nancy Cartwright, Ashley Peldon, Wallace Shawn, Richard Kind, Catherine Lloyd Burns, Ken Hudson Campbell, Scott Menville, Quinton Flynn, Kay Kuter, Katie Volding, Myles Jeffrey, Dee Dee Rescher, Harriet Sansom Harris, Frank Welker, Fred Savage, Ryan Taylor, Rajan Patel, Isaac Lichter-Marck, Patrick Egan	

== October–December ==
Opening		Title	Production company	Cast and crew	Ref.
O C T O B E R	2	Antz	DreamWorks / Pacific Data Images	Eric Darnell, Tim Johnson (directors); Paul Weitz, Chris Weitz, Todd Alcott (screenplay); Woody Allen, Gene Hackman, Sharon Stone, Sylvester Stallone, Jennifer Lopez, Christopher Walken, Anne Bancroft, Dan Aykroyd, Danny Glover, John Mahoney, Jane Curtin, Grant Shaud, Paul Mazursky, Jim Cummings, April Winchell, Jack Angel, Rodger Bumpass, Bill Farmer, Patrick Pinney, Phil Proctor, Eric Darnell, Mickie McGowan, Gary Schwartz, Jerry Sroka, Carole Jeghers, Marty Sixkiller	
O C T O B E R	2	The Impostors	Fox Searchlight Pictures	Stanley Tucci (director/screenplay); Oliver Platt, Stanley Tucci, Alfred Molina, Teagle F. Bougere, Elizabeth Bracco, Steve Buscemi, Billy Connolly, Allan Corduner, Hope Davis, Dana Ivey, Allison Janney, Richard Jenkins, Matt McGrath, Isabella Rossellini, Campbell Scott, Tony Shalhoub, Lili Taylor, Matt Malloy, Michael Emerson	
O C T O B E R	2	A Night at the Roxbury	Paramount Pictures / SNL Studios	John Fortenberry (director); Will Ferrell, Chris Kattan, Steve Koren (screenplay); Will Ferrell, Chris Kattan, Loni Anderson, Dan Hedaya, Molly Shannon, Dwayne Hickman, Maree Cheatham, Lochlyn Munro, Richard Grieco, Kristen Dalton, Jennifer Coolidge, Meredith Scott Lynn, Gigi Rice, Elisa Donovan, Michael Clarke Duncan, Colin Quinn, Twink Caplan, Eva Mendes, Mark McKinney, Chazz Palminteri, Christian Mixon, Joe Ranft, Agata Gotova	
O C T O B E R	2	Strangeland	Artisan Entertainment	John Pieplow (director); Dee Snider (screenplay); Kevin Gage, Elizabeth Pena, Brett Harrelson, Robert Englund, Dee Snider, Linda Cardellini, Amy Smart, Tucker Smallwood, Ivonne Coll, Robert LaSardo, J. Cooch Lucchese, Barbara Champion, Amal Rhoe	
O C T O B E R	2	What Dreams May Come	PolyGram Filmed Entertainment / Interscope Communications	Vincent Ward (director); Ronald Bass (screenplay); Robin Williams, Cuba Gooding Jr., Annabella Sciorra, Max von Sydow, Rosalind Chao, Lucinda Jenney, Werner Herzog, Jessica Brooks Grant, Josh Paddock	
O C T O B E R	4	Shot Through the Heart	HBO Pictures	David Attwood (director); Guy Hibbert, John Falk (screenplay); Linus Roache, Vincent Perez, Lia Williams, Adam Kotz, Soo Garay, Lothaire Bluteau, Viktória Bajza, Daniel Betts, Balázs Farkas, Zoltán Gera, Karianne Henderson, Róbert Irisz, Daniel Newman, Laura Petela, Gábor Piroch, Zoltán Rajkai, Zsuzsa Száger, Tibor Szervét, Barna Tóth, Caroline Trowbridge, Philip Whitchurch, Emil Wolk, Radovan Karadzic	
O C T O B E R	7	Love Is the Devil: Study for a Portrait of Francis Bacon	Strand Releasing	John Maybury (director/screenplay); Derek Jacobi, Daniel Craig, Tilda Swinton, Anne Lambton, Adrian Scarborough, Karl Johnson, Annabel Brooks, David Kennedy, Gary Hume, Antony Cotton, Hamish Bowles, Richard Newbould, Tallulah, Andy Linden	
O C T O B E R	9	Holy Man	Touchstone Pictures / Caravan Pictures / Roger Birnbaum Productions	Stephen Herek (director); Tom Schulman (screenplay); Eddie Murphy, Jeff Goldblum, Kelly Preston, Eric McCormack, Robert Loggia, Jon Cryer, Jennifer Taylor, Adriana Cataño, Eugene Levy, Morgan Fairchild, Betty White, Florence Henderson, James Brown, Soupy Sales, Dan Marino, Willard Scott, Nick Santa Maria, Nino Cerruti	
O C T O B E R	9	The Mighty	Miramax Films	Peter Chelsom (director); Charles Leavitt (screenplay); Sharon Stone, Gena Rowlands, Gillian Anderson, Harry Dean Stanton, Kieran Culkin, James Gandolfini, Elden Ratliff, Meat Loaf, Jenifer Lewis, Joseph Perrino, Dov Tiefenbach, Sting, Andy Summers	
O C T O B E R	9	One Tough Cop	Stratosphere Entertainment	Bruno Barreto (director); Jeremy Iacone (screenplay); Stephen Baldwin, Chris Penn, Gina Gershon, Mike McGlone, Luis Guzmán, Harvey Atkin, Paul Guilfoyle, Victor Slezak, Amy Irving, Jason Blicker, Bo Dietl, Frank Pellegrino, Michael Rispoli, Paul Calderón, Jean Paul, Larry Gilliard Jr., Philip Akin, Nigel Bennett	
O C T O B E R	9	Rushmore	Touchstone Pictures	Wes Anderson (director/screenplay); Owen Wilson (screenplay); Jason Schwartzman, Olivia Williams, Bill Murray, Seymour Cassel, Brian Cox, Mason Gamble, Sara Tanaka, Connie Nielsen, Luke Wilson, Stephen McCole, Kumar Pallana, Alexis Bledel	
O C T O B E R	13	Butter	HBO Pictures / Artisan Entertainment	Peter Gathings Bunche (director/screenplay); Shemar Moore, Ernie Hudson, Nia Long, Tony Todd, Donnie Wahlberg, Terrence Dashon Howard, Donald Faison, Salli Richardson, Tommy "Tiny" Lister Jr., Badja Djola, Nick Corello, Robert Miano, Samantha Phillips, Adjoa Middleton, Larry B. Scott, Henry Brown, Angela Alvarado, Ernie Hudson Jr., Kente Scott, Jesse Collins, Sam Rubin, George Clinton, Russell Simmons, Dick Scott, Joe Harris, James Russo, Cherry Martinez	
O C T O B E R	16	Beloved	Touchstone Pictures / Harpo Productions	Jonathan Demme (director); Akosua Busia, Richard LaGravenese, Adam Brooks (screenplay); Oprah Winfrey, Danny Glover, Thandie Newton, Kimberly Elise, Hill Harper, Beah Richards, LisaGay Hamilton, Jason Robards, Harry Northup, Jude Ciccolella, Wes Bentley, Irma P. Hall, Dorothy Love Coates, Charles Napier	
O C T O B E R	16	Bride of Chucky	Universal Pictures	Ronny Yu (director); Don Mancini (screenplay); Jennifer Tilly, Brad Dourif, Katherine Heigl, Nick Stabile, John Ritter, Alexis Arquette, Gordon Michael Woolvett, Lawrence Dane, Michael Louis Johnson, James Gallanders, Janet Kidder, Vince Corazza, Kathy Najimy	
O C T O B E R	16	Happiness	Good Machine Releasing	Todd Solondz (director/screenplay); Jane Adams, Elizabeth Ashley, Dylan Baker, Lara Flynn Boyle, Ben Gazzara, Jared Harris, Philip Seymour Hoffman, Louise Lasser, Jon Lovitz, Camryn Manheim, Rufus Read, Cynthia Stevenson, Gerry Becker, Arthur J. Nascarella, Molly Shannon, Ann Harada, Douglas McGrath, Anne Bobby	
O C T O B E R	16	Practical Magic	Warner Bros. Pictures / Village Roadshow Pictures	Griffin Dunne (director); Robin Swicord, Akiva Goldsman, Adam Brooks (screenplay); Sandra Bullock, Nicole Kidman, Dianne Wiest, Stockard Channing, Goran Višnjić, Chloe Webb, Aidan Quinn, Evan Rachel Wood, Alexandra Artrip, Margo Martindale, Lucinda Jenney, Mary Gross, Mark Feuerstein, Caprice Benedetti, Martha Gehman, Camilla Belle, Herta Ware, Ellen Geer, Peter Shaw, Lora Anne Criswell, Caralyn Kozlowski	
O C T O B E R	23	Apt Pupil	TriStar Pictures / Phoenix Pictures	Bryan Singer (director); Brandon Boyce (screenplay); Ian McKellen, Brad Renfro, David Schwimmer, Bruce Davison, Ann Dowd, James Karen, Elias Koteas, Joe Morton, Jan Triska, Michael Byrne, Heather McComb, Joshua Jackson	
O C T O B E R	23	Life Is Beautiful	Miramax Films	Roberto Benigni (director/screenplay); Vincenzo Cerami (screenplay); Roberto Benigni, Nicoletta Braschi, Giorgio Cantarini, Giustino Durano, Horst Buchholz, Marisa Paredes	
O C T O B E R	23	Pleasantville	New Line Cinema	Gary Ross (director/screenplay); Tobey Maguire, Jeff Daniels, Joan Allen, William H. Macy, Paul Walker, J.T. Walsh, Reese Witherspoon, Marley Shelton, Giuseppe Andrews, Jenny Lewis, Marissa Ribisi, Jane Kaczmarek, Don Knotts, Kevin Connors, Natalie Ramsey, David Tom, Dawn Cody, Maggie Lawson, Andrea Taylor, Denise Dowse, Justin Nimmo, Jason Behr, Lela Ivey, Marc Blucas, Nancy Lenehan, Patrick Thomas O'Brien, Danny Strong, Kristin Rudrüd	
O C T O B E R	23	Soldier	Warner Bros. Pictures / Morgan Creek Productions / Jerry Weintraub Productions	Paul W. S. Anderson (director); David Webb Peoples (screenplay); Kurt Russell, Jason Scott Lee, Connie Nielsen, Michael Chiklis, Gary Busey, Jason Isaacs, Sean Pertwee, Mark Bringelson, K. K. Dodds, James R. Black, Kyle Sullivan, Corbin Bleu, Sara Paxton, Mark De Alessandro, Vladimir Orlov, Carsten Norgaard, Duffy Gaver, Brenda Wehle, Elizabeth Dennehy, Paul Dillon, Max Daniels, Paul Sklar	
O C T O B E R	23	Orgazmo	October Films	Trey Parker (director/screenplay); Trey Parker, Matt Stone, Dian Bachar, Robyn Lynne, Michael Dean Jacobs	
O C T O B E R	27	The Lion King II: Simba's Pride	Walt Disney Home Video	Darrell Rooney, Rob DaLuca (directors); Flip Kobler, Cindy Marcus (screenplay); Matthew Broderick, Neve Campbell, Andy Dick, Robert Guillaume, James Earl Jones, Moira Kelly, Nathan Lane, Ernie Sabella, Jason Marsden, Suzanne Pleshette, Edward Hibbert, Lacey Chabert, Jennifer Lien, Jim Cummings, Cam Clarke, Michelle Horn, Meredith Scott Lynn, Ryan O'Donohue, Liz Callaway, Ashley Edner, Zoe Leader, Gene Miller, Charity Walthrop, Crysta Macalush Winton	
O C T O B E R	30	American History X	New Line Cinema	Tony Kaye (director/screenplay); David McKenna (screenplay); Edward Norton, Edward Furlong, Fairuza Balk, Stacy Keach, Elliott Gould, Avery Brooks, Ethan Suplee, Beverly D'Angelo, Jennifer Lien, William Russ, Guy Torry, Joe Cortese, Antonio David Lyons, Keram Malicki-Sanchez, Giuseppe Andrews, Christopher Masterson, Paul Le Mat	
O C T O B E R	30	Living Out Loud	New Line Cinema / Jersey Films	Richard LaGravenese (director/screenplay); Holly Hunter, Danny DeVito, Queen Latifah, Martin Donovan, Elias Koteas, Richard Schiff, Mariangela Pino, Suzanne Shepherd, Eddie Cibrian, Tamlyn Tomita	
O C T O B E R	30	Vampires	Columbia Pictures / Largo Entertainment / Storm King Productions	John Carpenter (director); Don Jakoby (screenplay); James Woods, Daniel Baldwin, Sheryl Lee, Thomas Ian Griffith, Maximilian Schell, Tim Guinee, Mark Boone Junior, Gregory Sierra, Cary-Hiroyuki Tagawa, Thomas Rosales Jr., Henry Kingi, David Rowden, Clarke Coleman, Chad Stahelski, Marjean Holden	
N O V E M B E R	3	Richie Rich's Christmas Wish	Warner Home Video / Warner Bros. Family Entertainment / Saban Entertainment / The Harvey Entertainment Company	John Murlowski (director); Rob Kerchner, Jason Feffer (screenplay); David Gallagher, Martin Mull, Lesley Ann Warren, Jake Richardson, Eugene Levy, Keene Curtis, Richard Riehle, Michelle Trachtenberg, Richard Fancy, Marla Maples, Kathleen Freeman, Billy Burnette, Rex Smith, Michael James McDonald, Don McLeod, Blake Jeremy Collins, Austin Stout, Robert Hart, Candi Brough, Randi Brough, Jim Jackman, John Crane, Lacey Taylor Robbins, Lex Robbins, Alfred Atienza, Cody Wesalis, Christopher Boyer, Steven Cragg, Amy Kidd	
N O V E M B E R	3	The First 9½ Weeks	Lionsgate (International); SNC Groupe M6 (France)	Alex Wright (director/screenplay); Paul Mercurio, Clara Bellar, Malcolm McDowell, Dennis Burkley, Victoria Mahoney, James Black, Richard Durden, Alexi Kaye Campbell, Anna Jacyszyn, William Keane, Paul Courtenay Hyu, Frederic Forrest	
N O V E M B E R	4	Belly	Artisan Entertainment	Hype Williams (director/screenplay); Nas, DMX, Taral Hicks, Tionne Watkins, Method Man, Tyrin Turner, Hassan Johnson, Oliver "Power" Grant, Louie Rankin, Stan Drayton, James Parris, Benjamin Chavis, Sean Paul, Lavita "Vita" Raynor, QBall, Ghostface Killah, AZ, Paula Ouch	
N O V E M B E R	6	A Cool, Dry Place	20th Century Fox / Fox 2000 Pictures	John N. Smith (director); Matthew McDuffie (screenplay); Vince Vaughn, Monica Potter, Joey Lauren Adams	
N O V E M B E R	6	Elizabeth	Gramercy Pictures / PolyGram Filmed Entertainment / Working Title Films / Film4 Productions	Shekhar Kapur (director); Michael Hirst (screenplay); Cate Blanchett, Geoffrey Rush, Christopher Eccleston, Joseph Fiennes, John Gielgud, Richard Attenborough, Kenny Doughty, Kathy Burke, Fanny Ardant, Vincent Cassel, Emily Mortimer, Daniel Craig, Eric Cantona, Kelly Macdonald, James Frain, Edward Hardwicke, Jamie Foreman, Terence Rigby, Angus Deayton, Amanda Ryan, Kenny Doughty, Wayne Sleep, Alfie Allen, Lily Allen, George Yiasoumi	
N O V E M B E R	6	Gods and Monsters	Lions Gate Films / Regent Entertainment / BBC Films	Bill Condon (director/screenplay); Ian McKellen, Brendan Fraser, Lynn Redgrave, Matt McKenzie, Arthur Dignam, Lolita Davidovich, Jack Plotnick, David Dukes, Rosalind Ayres, Jack Betts, Martin Ferrero, Marlon Braccia, Amir Aboulela, Cornelia Hayes O'Herlihy, Jesse James	
N O V E M B E R	6	The Siege	20th Century Fox	Edward Zwick (director/screenplay); Lawrence Wright, Menno Meyjes (screenplay); Denzel Washington, Annette Bening, Bruce Willis, Tony Shalhoub, David Proval, Aasif Mandvi, Sami Bouajila, Mark Valley, Lance Reddick, Lisa Lynn Masters, Jack Gwaltney, Wood Harris, David Costabile, Glenn Kessler, Ben Shenkman, Neal Jones, Donna Hanover, Chip Zien, Dakin Matthews, John Rothman, Will Lyman, Victor Slezak, Chris Messina, Matt Servitto, Susie Essman, Arianna Huffington, Robert Scheer, John Beard, Stan Brooks, Alex Chadwick, Luis Jimenez, Sean Hannity, Ron Kuby, Daniel Schorr, Curtis Sliwa, Susan Stamberg, Mary Alice Williams, Bill Clinton, Dave Mallow, Tom Malloy, Garry Pastore, Tony Snow, Lianna Pai, Ellen Bethea, Amro Salama, Ahmed Ben Larby	
N O V E M B E R	6	Velvet Goldmine	Miramax Films	Todd Haynes (director/screenplay); Ewan McGregor, Jonathan Rhys Meyers, Toni Collette, Christian Bale, Eddie Izzard, Micko Westmoreland, Alastair Cumming, Emily Woof, Joseph Beattie, Michael Feast, Lindsay Kemp, Janet McTeer	
N O V E M B E R	6	The Waterboy	Touchstone Pictures	Frank Coraci (director); Tim Herlihy, Adam Sandler (screenplay); Adam Sandler, Kathy Bates, Fairuza Balk, Henry Winkler, Jerry Reed, Larry Gilliard Jr., Blake Clark, Peter Dante, Jonathan Loughran, Clint Howard, Allen Covert, Rob Schneider, Kevin Farley, Robert Kokol, Frank Coraci, Paul "The Big Show" Wight, Soon Hee Newbold, Dan Fouts, Brent Musburger, Lynn Swann, Chris Fowler, Lee Corso, Trevor Miller, Dan Patrick, Lawrence Taylor, Bill Cowher, Jimmy Johnson, Jennifer Bini Taylor, Moosie The Cocker Spaniel	
N O V E M B E R	13	Dancing at Lughnasa	Sony Pictures Classics	Pat O'Connor (director); Frank McGuinness (screenplay); Meryl Streep, Michael Gambon, Catherine McCormack, Kathy Burke, Brid Brennan, Sophie Thompson, Rhys Ifans, Darrell Johnston, Lorcan Cranitch, Peter Gowen, Dawn Bradfield, Marie Mullen, John Kavanagh, Kate O'Toole	
N O V E M B E R	13	I Still Know What You Did Last Summer	Columbia Pictures / Mandalay Entertainment	Danny Cannon (director); Trey Callaway (screenplay); Jennifer Love Hewitt, Freddie Prinze Jr., Brandy Norwood, Mekhi Phifer, Matthew Settle, Muse Watson, Jennifer Esposito, Bill Cobbs, Jeffrey Combs, Benjamin Brown, Ellerine Harding, John Hawkes, Jack Black	
N O V E M B E R	13	I'll Be Home for Christmas	Walt Disney Pictures / Mandeville Films	Arlene Sanford (director); Michael Allin, Tom Nursall, Harris Goldberg (screenplay); Jonathan Taylor Thomas, Jessica Biel, Adam LaVorgna, Gary Cole, Eve Gordon, Sean O'Bryan, Andrew Lauer, Lauren Maltby, Lesley Boone	
N O V E M B E R	13	Meet Joe Black	Universal Pictures / City Light Films	Martin Brest (director); Bo Goldman, Kevin Wade, Ron Osborn, Jeff Reno (screenplay); Brad Pitt, Anthony Hopkins, Claire Forlani, Jake Weber, Marcia Gay Harden, Jeffrey Tambor, David S. Howard, Lois Kelly-Miller, Marylouise Burke, June Squibb	
N O V E M B E R	17	An All Dogs Christmas Carol	MGM Home Entertainment / Metro-Goldwyn-Mayer Animation / MGM/UA Family Entertainment	Paul Sabella, Gary Selvaggio (directors); Jymn Magon (screenplay); Steven Weber, Dom DeLuise, Sheena Easton, Ernest Borgnine, Charles Nelson Reilly, Bebe Neuwirth, Beth Anderson, Taylor Emerson, Carlos Alazraqui, Dee Bradley Baker, Chris Marquette, Gail Matthius, Aria Noelle Curzon, Ashley Tisdale, Amick Byram, Susan Boyd, Alvin Chea, Lorraine Feather, Carmen Twillie, Myles Jeffrey, Megan Malanga, Jamie Cronin, Billy Bodine, Randy Crenshaw, Edie Lehmann, Laurie Shillinger, Vanessa Vandergriff	
N O V E M B E R	20	Celebrity	Miramax Films	Woody Allen (director/screenplay); Hank Azaria, Kenneth Branagh, Judy Davis, Leonardo DiCaprio, Melanie Griffith, Famke Janssen, Michael Lerner, Joe Mantegna, Bebe Neuwirth, Winona Ryder, Charlize Theron, Gretchen Mol, Isaac Mizrahi, Douglas McGrath, J. K. Simmons, Dylan Baker, Debra Messing, Allison Janney, Kate Burton, Gerry Becker, Tony Sirico, Celia Weston, Aida Turturro, Lorri Bagley, David Margulies, Jeffrey Wright, Tony Darrow, Adrian Grenier, Sam Rockwell, John Doumanian, Greg Mottola, Michael Moon, Donald Trump, Ian Somerhalder, Karen Duffy, Frank Licari, Andre Gregory	
N O V E M B E R	20	Enemy of the State	Touchstone Pictures / Jerry Bruckheimer Films / Scott Free Productions	Tony Scott (director); David Marconi (screenplay); Will Smith, Gene Hackman, Jon Voight, Regina King, Loren Dean, Jake Busey, Scott Caan, Barry Pepper, Gabriel Byrne, Jason Lee, Lisa Bonet, Jack Black, Jamie Kennedy, James LeGros, Stuart Wilson, Laura Cayouette, Ian Hart, Jascha Washington, Anna Gunn, Grant Heslov, Bodhi Elfman, Dan Butler, Jason Robards, Seth Green, Tom Sizemore, Philip Baker Hall, Brian Markinson, Lillo Brancato, John Capodice, Ivana Miličević, Arthur J. Nascarella, Carlos Gómez, Paul Herman, Larry King	
N O V E M B E R	20	The Rugrats Movie	Paramount Pictures / Nickelodeon Movies / Klasky Csupo	Igor Kovalyov, Norton Virgien (directors); David N. Weiss, J. David Stern (screenplay); E.G. Daily, Christine Cavanaugh, Kath Soucie, Cheryl Chase, Tara Charendoff, Jack Riley, Melanie Chartoff, Joe Alaskey, Cree Summer, Michael Bell, Tress MacNeille, Phil Proctor, Andrea Martin, Tim Curry, Whoopi Goldberg, David Spade, Busta Rhymes, Margaret Cho, Tony Jay, Edie McClurg, Hattie Winston, Mary Gross, Kevin McBride, Charlie Adler, Gregg Berger, Roger Clinton Jr., Abraham Benrubi, Lenny Kravitz, Iggy Pop, Lisa Loeb, Gordon Gano, B-Real, The B-52's, Patti Smith, Jakob Dylan, Phife Dawg, Beck, Lou Rawls, Dawn Robinson, Laurie Anderson, Steven Zirnkilton, Devo, David Randolph, Robin Groth, Angel Harper, Judi M. Durand, Daamen J. Krall, Zoe Leader, David McCharen, Mary Linda Phillips	
N O V E M B E R	20	Waking Ned Devine	Fox Searchlight Pictures / Canal+	Kirk Jones (director/screenplay); Ian Bannen, David Kelly, Fionnula Flanagan, Susan Lynch, James Nesbitt, Fintan McKeown	
N O V E M B E R	21	Winchell	HBO Pictures	Paul Mazursky (director); Scott Abbott (screenplay); Stanley Tucci, Paul Giamatti, Christopher Plummer, Glenne Headly, Xander Berkeley, John O'Donohue, Michael Greene, Megan Mullally, Kevin Tighe, Frank Medrano, Vic Polizos, Joseph Benti, Paula Cale, Michael Chieffo, Jeremy Blackman, Paul Jenkins, Lamont Johnson, Kris Kamm, Sean Lawlor, Jack Lotz, Paul Mazursky, Peggy Miley, Oliver Muirhead, Francis X. McCarthy, David St. James, Sven-Ole Thorsen, Blayne Weaver, Joseph McCarthy, Ed Sullivan, Walter Winchell	
N O V E M B E R	25	A Bug's Life	Walt Disney Pictures / Pixar Animation Studios	John Lasseter (director); Andrew Stanton, Donald McEnery, Bob Shaw (screenplay); Dave Foley, Kevin Spacey, Julia Louis-Dreyfus, Hayden Panettiere, Phyllis Diller, Richard Kind, David Hyde Pierce, Denis Leary, Joe Ranft, Jonathan Harris, Madeline Kahn, Bonnie Hunt, Brad Garrett, Mike McShane, John Ratzenberger, Roddy McDowall, Edie McClurg, Alex Rocco, David Ossman, Rodger Bumpass, Carlos Alazraqui, Jack Angel, Bob Bergen, Kimberly J. Brown, Jennifer Darling, Debi Derryberry, Paul Eiding, Bill Farmer, Sam Gifaldi, Brad Hall, Jess Harnell, David L. Lander, John Lasseter, Sherry Lynn, Courtland Mead, Christina Milian, Jeff Pidgeon, Phil Proctor, Jan Rabson, Francesca Marie Smith, Andrew Stanton, Russi Taylor, Travis Tedford, Ashley Tisdale, Lee Unkrich, Ryan O'Donohue, Rachel Davey, Jessica Evans, Mickie McGowan, Kelsey Mulrooney, Jordan Ranft, Jordan Warkol	
N O V E M B E R	25	Babe: Pig in the City	Universal Pictures / Kennedy Miller Productions	George Miller (director/screenplay); Judy Morris, Mark Lamprell (screenplay); Magda Szubanski, James Cromwell, Mickey Rooney, Mary Stein, Paul Livingston, E.G. Daily, Danny Mann, Roscoe Lee Browne, Glenne Headly, Steven Wright, James Cosmo, Stanley Ralph Ross, Russi Taylor, Adam Goldberg, Eddie Barth, Bill Capizzi, Miriam Margolyes, Hugo Weaving, Jim Cummings, Katie Leigh, Nathan Kress, Al Mancini, Larry Moss, Victor Brandt, Pippa Grandison, Scotty Leavenworth, Carly Schroeder, Roger Rose, Drew Lexi Thomas, Barbara Harris, Aaron Spann, Naomi Watts, Julie Godfrey, Myles Jeffrey, Jeannie Elias, Evelyn Krape, Charles Bartlett, Michael Edward-Stevens, Lisa Bailey, Lisa Bailer, Blayn Barbosa, J.D. Hall, Mark Hammond, Julie Oppenheimer, Wendy Hammers, Julie Offen, Deborah Packer, Joseph R. Sicari, Lexi Thomas	
N O V E M B E R	25	Home Fries	Warner Bros. Pictures	Dean Parisot (director); Vince Gilligan (screenplay); Drew Barrymore, Luke Wilson, Catherine O'Hara, Shelley Duvall, Jake Busey, Daryl Mitchell, Lanny Flaherty, Chris Ellis, Kim Robillard, Blue Deckert, Theresa Merritt, John Hawkes, Marco Perella	
N O V E M B E R	25	Ringmaster	Artisan Entertainment / The Kushner-Locke Company	Neil Abramson (director); Jon Bernstein (screenplay); Jerry Springer, Jaime Pressly, William McNamara, Molly Hagan, John Capodice, Wendy Raquel Robinson, Ashley Holbrook, Tangie Ambrose, Nicki Micheaux, Krista Tesreau, Dawn Maxey, Maximilliana, Michael Jai White, Michael Dudikoff	
N O V E M B E R	25	Very Bad Things	PolyGram Filmed Entertainment / Interscope Communications	Peter Berg (director/screenplay); Cameron Diaz, Jon Favreau, Daniel Stern, Jeremy Piven, Christian Slater, Leland Orser, Jeanne Tripplehorn, Joey Zimmerman, Kobe Tai	
D E C E M B E R	4	Little Voice	Miramax Films	Mark Herman (director/screenplay); Jane Horrocks, Brenda Blethyn, Michael Caine, Ewan McGregor, Jim Broadbent, Philip Jackson, Annette Badland	
D E C E M B E R	4	Psycho	Universal Pictures / Imagine Entertainment	Gus Van Sant (director); Joseph Stefano (screenplay); Vince Vaughn, Julianne Moore, Anne Heche, Viggo Mortensen, William H. Macy, Robert Forster, Philip Baker Hall, Anne Haney, Rance Howard, Chad Everett, Rita Wilson, James Remar, James LeGros, Mike "Flea" Balzary, Ryan Cutrona, Ken Jenkins, Roy Brocksmith, Rose Marie, Gus Van Sant	
D E C E M B E R	11	Jack Frost	Warner Bros. Pictures	Troy Miller (director); Mark Steven Johnson, Jonathan Roberts, Steve Bloom, Jeff Cesario (screenplay); Michael Keaton, Kelly Preston, Joseph Cross, Mark Addy, Henry Rollins, Mika Boorem, Andrew Lawrence, Eli Marienthal, Will Rothhaar, Taylor Handley, Dweezil Zappa, Ahmet Zappa, Paul F. Tompkins, Jay Johnston, Jeff Cesario, Ajai Sanders, John Ennis, Wayne Federman, Pat Crawford Brown, Trevor Rabin, Lili Haydn, Lou Molino III, Scott Colomby, Moon Unit Zappa, Bruce Lanoil, Scott Kraft, Denise Cheshire	
D E C E M B E R	11	Shakespeare in Love	Miramax Films	John Madden (director); Marc Norman, Tom Stoppard (screenplay); Gwyneth Paltrow, Joseph Fiennes, Geoffrey Rush, Colin Firth, Ben Affleck, Judi Dench, Simon Callow, Jim Carter, Martin Clunes, Antony Sher, Imelda Staunton, Tom Wilkinson, Mark Williams, Daniel Brocklebank, Jill Baker, Patrick Barlow, Rupert Everett, John Inman, Joe Roberts, Sandra Reinton	
D E C E M B E R	11	A Simple Plan	Paramount Pictures / Mutual Film Company / Savoy Pictures	Sam Raimi (director); Scott B. Smith (screenplay); Bill Paxton, Billy Bob Thornton, Bridget Fonda, Brent Briscoe, Gary Cole, Jack Walsh, Chelcie Ross, Becky Ann Baker	
D E C E M B E R	11	Star Trek: Insurrection	Paramount Pictures	Jonathan Frakes (director); Michael Piller (screenplay); Patrick Stewart, Jonathan Frakes, Brent Spiner, LeVar Burton, Michael Dorn, Gates McFadden, Marina Sirtis, F. Murray Abraham, Donna Murphy, Anthony Zerbe, Stephanie Niznik, Daniel Hugh Kelly, Gregg Henry, Michael Welch, Michael Horton, Tom Morello, Bruce French, John Hostetter, Rick Worthy, Larry Anderson, Raye Birk, Peggy Miley, Claudette Nevins, Joseph Ruskin, McKenzie Westmore	
D E C E M B E R	18	The General	Sony Pictures Classics	John Boorman (director/screenplay); Brendan Gleeson, Jon Voight, Adrian Dunbar, Seán McGinley, Maria Doyle Kennedy, Angeline Ball, Eanna MacLiam, Tom Murphy, Paul Hickey, Tommy O'Neill, John O'Toole, Ciaran Fitzgerald, Ned Dennehy, Vinny Murphy, Roxanna Williams	
D E C E M B E R	18	Playing by Heart	Miramax Films / Intermedia Films / Hyperion Pictures	Willard Carroll (director/screenplay); Gillian Anderson, Ellen Burstyn, Sean Connery, Anthony Edwards, Angelina Jolie, Jay Mohr, Ryan Phillippe, Dennis Quaid, Gena Rowlands, Jon Stewart, Madeleine Stowe, April Grace, Kellie Waymire, Michael Emerson, Amanda Peet, Alec Mapa, Michael B. Silver, Hal Landon Jr., David Clennon, Hilary Duff, Nastassja Kinski, Matt Malloy, Jeremy Sisto	
D E C E M B E R	18	The Prince of Egypt	DreamWorks	Simon Wells, Brenda Chapman, Steve Hickner (directors); Philip LaZebnik, Nicholas Meyer (screenplay); Val Kilmer, Ralph Fiennes, Michelle Pfeiffer, Sandra Bullock, Jeff Goldblum, Patrick Stewart, Helen Mirren, Danny Glover, Steve Martin, Martin Short, Ofra Haza, Anne Lockhart, Amick Byram, Sally Dworsky, Eden Riegel, Brian Stokes Mitchell, Brenda Chapman, Bobby Motown, Linda Dee Shayne	
D E C E M B E R	18	You've Got Mail	Warner Bros. Pictures	Nora Ephron (director/screenplay); Delia Ephron (screenplay); Tom Hanks, Meg Ryan, Parker Posey, Jean Stapleton, Dave Chappelle, Steve Zahn, Greg Kinnear, Heather Burns, Dabney Coleman, John Randolph, Deborah Rush, Hallee Hirsh, Jeffrey Scaperrotta, Cara Seymour, Katie Finneran, Michael Badalucco, Veanne Cox, Bruce Jay Friedman, Sara Ramirez, Reiko Aylesworth, Katie Sagona, Chris Messina, André Sogliuzzo, Jane Adams, Alfonso Gomez-Rejon	
D E C E M B E R	22	The Secret of NIMH 2: Timmy to the Rescue	MGM Home Entertainment / MGM Animation / MGM Family Entertainment / Wang Film Productions	Dick Sebast (director); Sam Graham, Chris Hubbell, Jymn Magon (screenplay); Ralph Macchio, Dom DeLuise, Phillip Glasser, Eric Idle, William H. Macy, Arthur Malet, Hynden Walch, Andrea Martin, Harvey Korman, Meshach Taylor, Doris Roberts, Debi Mae West, Steve Mackall, Darlene Carr, Jameson Parker, Kevin Michael Richardson, Neil Ross, Frank Welker, Phillip Van Dyke, Peter MacNicol, Jamie Cronin, Whitney Claire Kaufman, Andrew Ducote, Alexander Strange	
D E C E M B E R	23	The Theory of Flight	Fine Line Features	Paul Greengrass (director); Richard Hawkins (screenplay); Helena Bonham Carter, Kenneth Branagh, Gemma Jones, Holly Aird, Ray Stevenson	
D E C E M B E R	23	The Thin Red Line	20th Century Fox / Fox 2000 Pictures / Phoenix Pictures	Terrence Malick (director/screenplay); Sean Penn, Jim Caviezel, Nick Nolte, Elias Koteas, Ben Chaplin, Adrien Brody, George Clooney, John Cusack, Woody Harrelson, Jared Leto, John C. Reilly, John Travolta, Dash Mihok, Tim Blake Nelson, Larry Romano, John Savage, Arie Verveen, Kirk Acevedo, Penny Allen, Mark Boone Junior, Matt Doran, Don Harvey, Danny Hoch, Thomas Jane, Miranda Otto, Nick Stahl	
D E C E M B E R	25	A Civil Action	Touchstone Pictures / Paramount Pictures	Steven Zaillian (director/screenplay); John Travolta, Robert Duvall, James Gandolfini, Dan Hedaya, John Lithgow, William H. Macy, Kathleen Quinlan, Tony Shalhoub, Željko Ivanek, Bruce Norris, Peter Jacobson, Stephen Fry, Sydney Pollack, David Thornton, Daniel von Bargen, Paul Ben-Victor, Ned Eisenberg, Mary Mara, Denise Dowse, Kathy Bates, Margot Rose, Clayton Landey, Alan Wilder, Josh Pais, Haskell V. Anderson III, Kaiulani Lee, Howie Carr, Robert Cicchini, Rikki Klieman, Rob McElhenney, Gene Wolande, Juliana Donald, Charles Levin, Jay Patterson, Bryan Greenberg, Edward Herrmann, Harry Dean Stanton	
D E C E M B E R	25	Down in the Delta	Miramax Films	Maya Angelou (director); Myron Goble (screenplay); Alfre Woodard, Al Freeman Jr., Esther Rolle, Mary Alice, Loretta Devine, Wesley Snipes, Anne-Marie Johnson, Mpho Koaho, Richard Yearwood	
D E C E M B E R	25	The Faculty	Dimension Films / Los Hooligans Productions	Robert Rodriguez (director); Kevin Williamson (screenplay); Josh Hartnett, Elijah Wood, Shawn Hatosy, Jordana Brewster, Clea DuVall, Laura Harris, Robert Patrick, Bebe Neuwirth, Piper Laurie, Famke Janssen, Usher Raymond, Salma Hayek, Jon Stewart, Daniel von Bargen, Susan Willis, Christopher McDonald, Libby Villari, Danny Masterson, Wiley Wiggins, Jon Abrahams, Summer Phoenix, Harry Knowles, Louis Black, Duane Martin, Katherine Willis, Eric Jungmann	
D E C E M B E R	25	Hurlyburly	Fine Line Features	Anthony Drazan (director); David Rabe (screenplay); Sean Penn, Kevin Spacey, Robin Wright Penn, Chazz Palminteri, Garry Shandling, Anna Paquin, Meg Ryan	
D E C E M B E R	25	Mighty Joe Young	Walt Disney Pictures / RKO Pictures	Ron Underwood (director); Merian C. Cooper, Ruth Rose, Mark Rosenthal, Lawrence Konner (screenplay); Bill Paxton, Charlize Theron, Rade Šerbedžija, Peter Firth, Regina King, David Paymer, Naveen Andrews, Robert Ray Wisdom, Christian Clemenson, Scarlett Pomers, Geoffrey Blake, Lawrence Pressman, Linda Purl, Mika Boorem, Cory Buck, Reno Wilson, Judson Mills, Verne Troyer	
D E C E M B E R	25	Patch Adams	Universal Pictures / Blue Wolf Productions	Tom Shadyac (director); Steve Oedekerk (screenplay); Robin Williams, Monica Potter, Philip Seymour Hoffman, Bob Gunton, Daniel London, Peter Coyote, Frances Lee McCain, Irma P. Hall, Josef Sommer, Harold Gould, Harve Presnell, Michael Jeter, Barry Shabaka Henley, Harry Groener, Richard Kiley, Ryan Hurst, Ellen Albertini Dow, Alan Tudyk, Dot Jones, Douglas Roberts, Norman Alden, James Greene, Greg Sestero, Ralph Peduto	
D E C E M B E R	25	Stepmom	Columbia Pictures / 1492 Pictures	Chris Columbus (director); Gigi Levangie Grazer, Jessie Nelson, Steven Rogers, Ronald Bass, Karen Leigh Hopkins (screenplay); Julia Roberts, Susan Sarandon, Ed Harris, Jena Malone, Liam Aiken, Lynn Whitfield, Darrell Larson, Mary Louise Wilson	
D E C E M B E R	30	Affliction	Lions Gate Films	Paul Schrader (director/screenplay); Nick Nolte, Sissy Spacek, James Coburn, Willem Dafoe, Mary Beth Hurt, Brigid Tierney, Holmes Osborne, Jim True-Frost, Tim Post, Christopher Heyerdahl, Marian Seldes, Janine Theriault, Paul Stewart, Wayne Robson, Sean McCann, Sheena Larkin	
D E C E M B E R	30	Another Day in Paradise	Trimark Pictures	Larry Clark (director); Stephen Chin, Christopher B. Landon (screenplay); James Woods, Melanie Griffith, Vincent Kartheiser, Natasha Gregson Wagner, James Otis, Branden Williams, Brent Briscoe, Peter Sarsgaard, Lou Diamond Phillips	
D E C E M B E R	30	Hilary and Jackie	October Films	Anand Tucker (director); Frank Cottrell Boyce (screenplay); Emily Watson, Rachel Griffiths, James Frain, David Morrissey, Charles Dance, Celia Imrie, Rupert Penry-Jones, Bill Paterson, Nyree Dawn Porter, Vernon Dobtcheff, Helen Rowe, Keeley Flanders, Auriol Evans	
D E C E M B E R	30	The Hi-Lo Country	Gramercy Pictures / PolyGram Filmed Entertainment / Working Title Films	Stephen Frears (director); Walon Green (screenplay); Billy Crudup, Penélope Cruz, Woody Harrelson, Patricia Arquette, Cole Hauser, Sam Elliott, James Gammon, Enrique Castillo, Katy Jurado, Darren E. Burrows, Jacob Vargas, Robert Knott, John Diehl, Bob Tallman, Lane Smith, Rosaleen Linehan, Rose Maddox, Leon Rausch, Don Walser, Marty Stuart, Chris O'Connell, Connie Smith	

== See also ==
- List of 1998 box office number-one films in the United States
- 1998 in the United States
