= Mario Jackson =

American actor

- Born: August 14, 1961; Los Angeles, California, U.S.
- Died: May 6, 2007 (aged 45); Los Angeles, California, U.S.
- Occupation: Actor

Mario Jackson (August 14, 1961 – May 6, 2007) was an American actor and grip.

Jackson was killed in a double homicide outside a motorcycle club in Los Angeles, California on May 6, 2007. He, along with a friend, Tierney Yates, was shot in the torso and died, while the suspect fled the scene. The season three premiere of Bones, which aired on September 25, 2007, is dedicated to Jackson in the credits of the episode: "Dedicated to our friend, Mario Jackson, 1961-2007."

== Filmography ==
- Baby (2001) ... Roger
- Bulworth (1998) ... Snag
- Bones
