= Alan Wilder (actor) =

American actor (born 1953)

- Born: September 24, 1953 (age 72); Chicago, Illinois, U.S.
- Occupation: Actor
- Years active: 1978–2009

Alan Wilder (born September 24, 1953) is an American former actor who has appeared in film and television. Wilder is also a member of the Steppenwolf Theater Company, and has appeared in over 70 Steppenwolf productions.

== Filmography ==
Year	Film	Role	Notes
1978	A Wedding	Caterer	Uncredited
1988	Poltergeist III	Observer	
1988	Betrayed	Duffin	
1988	Child's Play	Walter Criswell	
1989	Dream Breakers	Salesman	Television film
1990	Home Alone	Scranton Ticket Agent	
1991	The Grapes of Wrath	Muley Graves	Television film
1992	Straight Talk	Snake Man	
1992	A League of Their Own	Nelson	
1993	Jack Reed: Badge of Honor	Billy	Television film
1994	Bigfoot: The Unforgettable Encounter	Vern	Episode: "The Good Death"
1994	Mad About You	Registrar #1	Episode: "Disorientation"
1996	Party of Five	Mr. Shiffer	Episode: "Short Cuts"
1996	Early Edition	Friendly Guy	Episode: "Pilot"
1996	Cybill	Doctor	Episode: "It's for You, Mrs. Lincoln"
1996	Public Morals	Father Dan	Episode: "The Red Cover"
1996	Murphy Brown	Red	Episode: "Separation Anxiety"
1997	Frasier	Leo	Episode: "Are You Being Served?"
1997	Kiss the Girls	Reporter	
1997	George & Leo	Tom	Episode: "The Job"
1997, 1999	The Practice	Walter Rowland, Gerry Pyle	2 episodes
1998	Always Outnumbered	Anton Crier	Television film
1998	Sour Grapes	Irwin	
1998	A Civil Action	Insurance Lawyer	
1998	Ghosts of Fear Street	Safety Czar	Television film
2004	Karen Sisco	Bank Manager	Episode: "Dog Day Sisco"
2004	Oliver Beene	Pat O'Shaughnessy	Episode: "Idol Chatter"
2005	Charmed	Dr. Randall	Episode: "Freaky Phoebe"
2005	Monk	Harold Gumbal	Episode: "Mr. Monk and the Other Detective"
2005	Prison Break	Prison Chaplain, Reverend Mailor	2 episodes
2006	Dark Mind	Patent Lawyer	
2006	ER	Ottley	Episode: "No Place to Hide"
2007	Who You Know	Gunther	
2009	Gifted Hands: The Ben Carson Story	German Obstetrician	Television film; uncredited
2009	Public Enemies	Robert Estill	
