= Lauren E. Banks =

American actress

- Education: David Geffen School of Drama at Yale University
- Occupation: Actress
- Television: City on a Hill; Lawmen: Bass Reeves

Lauren E. Banks is an American television and film actress. She is best known for her television roles as Siobhan Quay in the Showtime crime drama City on a Hill (2019) and Jennie Reeves in the Paramount+ western series Lawmen: Bass Reeves (2023).

== Early life ==
Banks is from Durham, North Carolina, where she attended Hillside High School. She was a keen track and field athlete and captain of the basketball team, as well as president of the drama club. She then attended Howard University and the Yale School of Drama.

== Career ==
Banks appeared as defense attorney Siobhan Quay alongside Kevin Bacon and Aldis Hodge in Showtime 1990s Boston-set series City on a Hill, landing a role in season one shortly after graduating from Yale Drama School in 2017 and moving to series regular with season two.

She has also appeared in the Starz limited series Gaslit. Her other credits include Maniac for Netflix and Dietland from AMC. In 2023, she was cast in Taylor Sheridan's historical western series Lawmen: Bass Reeves as Jennie, the wife of David Oyelowo's portrayal of Bass Reeves. Her performance was described as being “played with warmth and great feeling” by Mike Hale in The New York Times.

In October 2023, she was added to the cast of The Dutchman, an upcoming American thriller film directed by Andre Gaines, based on the 1964 play of the same name by Amiri Baraka.

== Personal life ==
Banks has an allergy to lanolin and has to use vegan beauty products. She regularly practices yoga and meditation.

== Filmography ==
Key
†	Denotes works that have not yet been released

Year	Title	Role	Notes
2018	Instinct	Deidre	1 episode
2018	Dietland	Elena	2 episodes
2018	Maniac	Prosecutor/Winged nymph	2 episodes
2019-2022	City on a Hill	Siobahn Quay	26 episodes
2022	Gaslit	Janelle Lewis	1 episode
2022	Roar	Lu	Episode The Woman Who Disappeared
2023	Lawmen: Bass Reeves	Jennie Reeves	Lead role
2025	The Dutchman	Gina	
