= Dutchman (play) =

1964 play by Amiri Baraka

- Original language: English
- Written by: Amiri Baraka
- Characters: Clay; Lula; Riders of Coach; Young Negro; Conductor
- Subject: 1900-1999, African Americans, African Americans Drama, American drama, American drama 20th century, American Postmodern Play
- Setting: Underground, the subway

Premiere
- Date: March 1964
- Place: Cherry Lane Theatre (Greenwich Village, New York City)

Dutchman is a play written by playwright Amiri Baraka, then known as LeRoi Jones. Dutchman was first presented at the Cherry Lane Theatre in Greenwich Village, New York City, in March 1964 co-produced by Rita Fredricks. The play won an Obie Award; it shared this distinction with Adrienne Kennedy's Funnyhouse of a Negro. Baraka's stage play was made into a film in 1967, starring Shirley Knight and Al Freeman Jr. Dutchman was the last play produced by Baraka under his birth name, LeRoi Jones. At the time, he was in the process of divorcing his Jewish wife, Hettie Jones, embracing Black nationalism, and after lamenting the death of Malcolm X in 1965. Dutchman may be described as a political allegory depicting black and white relations during the time Baraka wrote it. With Dutchman and his other works, Baraka was a respected playwright in the Black Arts Movement and is considered a major African American literary figure alongside Phyllis Wheatley, Frederick Douglass, Paul Laurence Dunbar, Langston Hughes, Zora Neale Hurston, Richard Wright, and Ralph Ellison .

The play was revived for the first time off-Broadway in 2007 at the Cherry Lane Theatre starring Dulé Hill and Jennifer Mudge, and in 2013 and 2025 was restaged by Rashid Johnson at the Russian and Turkish Baths in the East Village.

== Plot ==
Scene I

The action focuses almost exclusively on Lula, a mature 30-year-old white woman, and Clay, a 20-year-old young black man, who both ride the subway in New York City. Clay's name is symbolic of the malleability of black identity and black manhood. It is also symbolic of integrationist and assimilationist ideologies within the contemporary Civil Rights Movement. Lula boards the train eating an apple, an allusion to the Biblical Eve or temptation of Satan. The characters engage in a long, flirtatious conversation throughout the train ride.

Lula sits down next to Clay. She accuses him of staring at her buttocks. She ignores his denials and uses stereotypes to correctly guess where he lives, where he is going, what Clay's friend, Warren, looks and talks like. Lula guesses that Clay tried to get his own sister to have sex with him when he was 10. Clay is shocked by her apparent knowledge of his past and says that she must be a friend of Warren.

Lula is glad that Clay is so easy to manipulate and puts her hand on his leg. She feeds him apples. She tells Clay to invite her out to the party he is going to. At this point, it is unclear whether Clay is really going to a party, but he tells her he really is. Lula vaguely alludes to having sex with Clay at her "apartment" after the "party". We don't know if these are real or conveniently made-up by Lula.

Scene II

Clay is gladdened by Lula's apparent liking for him and maintains a hopeful attitude to having sex together. However, he does not push his hope onto her and waits for Lula to make the offer first.

Lula is angered by Clay's not falling for her manipulative tactics. She switches strategies and mocks Clay's Anglo-American speech, his college education and his three-button suit. She derides his being black and passive. She dances mockingly in an R&B style and tells Clay to join her and "do the nasty. Rub bellies".

Clay, who does not respond initially, eventually grabs her and throws her down. Clay accuses Lula of knowing nothing but "luxury". He slaps her twice and tells her to leave him alone.

Clay launches into a monologue. Clay suggests that whites let black people dance "black" dances and make "black" music. He explains that these segregatory actions assuage black Americans' anger towards whites and distracts them from accessing the "white man's intellectual legacy". Clay states that if black people stopped trying to heal their pain through dance, music, civic participation, religion, or focusing on moving upwards in American society, and became coldly rational like white people, black people would just kill all the whites and be done with racism in America. Clay says that if he were to take Lula's words to heart, he should just kill all the white people he meets.

Although Clay says all this, he deeply rejects this plan of action. He states that he does not want to kill and that he prefers to be ignorant of the problem. He says he would rather choose to pretend to be ignorant of racism, not try to get rid of it by fighting with whites.

Once Clay makes his confession, Lula changes strategies again. Clay makes as if to leave, but Lula coolly, rationally, stabs him twice to the heart. She directs all the other passengers, blacks and whites, in the train car to throw his body out and get out at the next stop.

The play ends with Lula looking towards another young black man who has just boarded the now mostly empty train car. The elderly black train conductor steps into the compartment and tips Lula his hat.

== Analysis ==
Symbolism: The Atlantic Trade

The play's title evokes images of Dutch ships that carried slaves across the Atlantic. The subway car itself, endlessly traveling the same course, is symbolic of "The Course of History." Another layer of the title's symbolism is the myth of the Flying Dutchman, a ghost ship which, much like the subway car Clay rides on, endlessly sails on with a crew that is unable to escape the confines of the vessel. The moment at the end of the play when Clay's corpse is thrown from the moving train, recalls the context of transatlantic slave ships, with Lula as the enslaver and Clay one of the enslaved people.

Modernity and Double Consciousness

Clay, as a Black man in the play, is a character who speaks and extends to the discussion of “double consciousness,” a term, idea, and concept that was first introduced by W. E. B. Du Bois's autoethnographic work, The Souls of Black Folk in 1903. Throughout the play, Lula’s lines, at many moments, suggested the conception of double consciousness in Clay’s dressing in a suit, self-control speech, childhood upbringing, and intellectual mannerism as an educated man. Nevertheless, these contained images burst and erupted with his heightened and raged monologue at the end of the play. Double consciousness raises the question of Black identity with the experience of “dual soul.” This idea within the context of modernity specifically directs the audience into understanding and analyzing Clay’s identity as an American and a Black man in America. It is the modern discourse of African American experience in America that Dutchman emphasized. Referencing the symbolic connection of the Atlantic Trade, the concept of double consciousness draws a critical analysis of the “Black Atlantic” in Paul Gilroy’s "The Black Atlantic: Modernity and Double Consciousness.” Gilroy, overall, argues that in the modern world, which Dutchman was set in, Black people everywhere have to carry the doubleness of their identity as a diasporic community. Nevertheless, Gilroy also advocates how “dual soul” builds intercultural power that unites Black people and communities around the world.

== Characters ==
1. Clay: is a 20-year-old, middle-class black man. He is college educated, and well dressed. Clay is extremely calm and well mannered, although he finally reaches his breaking point by the end of the play. It is thought that Clay's character is both real and symbolic, symbolizing the struggle of all black men.
2. Lula: is a 30-year-old white woman. She is tall, slender, and has long red hair. She is described in the play as wearing loud lipstick, bright and skimpy summer clothes, sandals, and sunglasses. Like Clay, Lula is symbolic, she symbolizes "White America". Throughout the play, Lula continues to seduce and taunt Clay.
3. Riders of Coach: are white and black. Although they do not play an important role until the end of the play, they are witnesses to Clay's rant, and his murder.
4. Young Negro: is about 20 years old and has a couple of books under his arm. It is suggested at the end of the play that he is Lula's next victim.
5. Conductor: is portrayed as a happy spirited man, mumbling a song to himself, and swaying down the aisle to a song in his head. He does not appear until the end of the play.

== Cast and characters ==
Characters	Original Off-Broadway (Cherry Lane Theatre) 1964	First Off-Broadway revival (Cherry Lane Theatre) 2007
Clay	Robert Hooks	Dulé Hill
Lula	Jennifer West	Jennifer Mudge
Young Negro	N/A	Justin Carter
Conductor	N/A	Paul Benjamin

== Production history ==
The table is a record list of Dutchman theater productions produced in the US.

Years	Theater/Company	States	Director
1964	Cherry Lane Theatre	New York	Edward Parone
1965	Trinity Square Playhouse	Rhode Island	Adrian Hall
1978	Monterey Peninsula College Theatre Company	California	Ramie Wikdahl
1997	Trap Door Theatre	Illinois	Michael S. Pieper
1998	Shelton Theater	California	Matthew Shelton
2000	Hartford Stage	Connecticut	Jonathan Wilson
2001	The Excaliber Shakespeare Company of Chicago	Illinois	Darryl Maximilian Robinson
2002	Source Theatre Company	Washington, D.C.	Ralph Remington
2002	Iron Age Theatre and The Montgomery County Cultural Center	Philadelphia	John Doyle
2007	Cherry Lane Theatre	New York	Bill Duke
2009	Magenta Giraffe Theatre Company	Michigan	LoriGoe Nowak
2014	Definition Theatre Company	Illinois	Tyrone Phillips
2014	National Black Theatre and The Classical Theatre of Harlem	New York	Carl Cofield
2014	The World's Stage Theatre Company	Wisconsin	Sherrick Robinson
2015	New Federal Theatre	New York	Woody King Jr.
2015	A.R.T./MXAT Institute	Massachusetts	Scott Zigler
2016	American Blues Theater	Illinois	Chuck Smith
2017	KC Melting Pot Theatre	Missouri	Nicole Hodges Persley
2018	The Secret Theatre	New York	DeMone Seraphin
2019	Those Guilty Creatures	New York	Ryan Dobrin
2020-2021	Ball State University Department of Theatre & Dance	Indiana	André Garner
2022	American Stage Theatre Company	Florida	Erica Sutherlin
2022	Sunstone Studios	Wisconsin	Di'Monte Henning

== Film adaptation ==
In 1967, Dutchman was adapted into a film directed by English filmmaker Anthony Harvey and starring Shirley Knight as Lula and Al Freeman Jr. as Clay, reprising their roles from the play's Los Angeles production. According to Joseph Lelyveld, an executive editor of The New York Times, the film was shot with a budget of US$600,000 in six days. Although set on the New York City Subway's D train, which runs from the Bronx to Coney Island, the film was shot in a studio outside London. The film adaptation raised discussions about surrealism, tension violence and race, and the existence “in a vacuum” that was set in one location only. Shirley Knight won the Best Actress award at the 28th Venice International Film Festival in 1967 for her performance.

Another adaptation was set to begin filming in 2023, with Andre Gaines to direct, co-write, and produce the film, starring André Holland, Zazie Beetz, Kate Mara, and Stephen McKinley Henderson. It was secured by SAG-AFTRA interim agreement during the ongoing 2023 SAG-AFTRA strike. Aldis Hodge and Lauren E. Banks were both cast a month later. The film premiered on March 8, 2025, at the 2025 South by Southwest Film & TV Festival.

== Bibliography ==
- Atallah K.A. Diyaiy, Sabah. “The Dilemma of the Black Man in LeRoi Jones’ Play Dutchman.” Al-Fatih Journal 40 (2009): 13-22.
- Baraka, Imamu Amiri. Dutchman and The Slave, Two Plays. Morrow, 1964.
- Baraka, Amiri. The Autobiography of LeRoi Jones/Amiri Baraka Freundlich Books : Distributed to the trade by Scribner, 1984.
- Gilroy, Paul. "The Black Atlantic: Modernity and Double Consciousness." Harvard UP (1993).Lelyveld, Joseph. “LeRoi Jones’s ‘Dutchman’ in Exile; Jones’s ‘Dutchman’ in Exile.” The New York Times, The New York Times, 18 Sept. 1966, www.nytimes.com/1966/09/18/archives/leroi-joness-dutchman-in-exile-joness-dutchman-in-exile.html.
- Solomon, Rivers, et al. The deep. Simon and Schuster, 2019.
- Taubman, Howard. “The Theater: “Dutchman”; Drama Opens on Triple Bill at Cherry Lane; the Casts.” The New York Times, 25 Mar. 1964, www.nytimes.com/1964/03/25/archives/the-theater-dutchman-drama-opens-on-triple-bill-at-cherry-lane-the.html.
