= Diverge (film) =

2016 film by James Morrison

- Film poster
- Directed by: James Morrison
- Written by: James Morrison
- Produced by: David Mandel; Noah Lang
- Starring: Ivan Sandomire; Jamie Jackson; Erin Cunningham; Andrew Sensenig; Chris Henry Coffey
- Cinematography: Darin Quan
- Edited by: Chris Talson; James Morrison
- Music by: Brooke Blair; Will Blair
- Production companies: Gentile Entertainment; Dogfish Pictures; Easy Open Productions; Young Gunner Films
- Distributed by: Gravitas Ventures
- Release dates: June 9, 2016 (AoBFF); February 6, 2018 (streaming)
- Running time: 85 minutes
- Country: United States
- Language: English

Diverge is a 2016 American science fiction thriller film directed, written, and co-edited by James Morrison (in his feature directorial debut). It stars Ivan Sandomire, Jamie Jackson, Erin Cunningham, Andrew Sensenig, and Chris Henry Coffey. It follows a solitary survivor of a deadly virus who is given the chance to reclaim his life by altering his past.

The film had its world premiere at the 6th Art of Brooklyn Film Festival on June 9, 2016. After over a year on the festival circuit, it was released on iTunes and VOD on February 6, 2018, by Gravitas Ventures.

== Synopsis ==
In the aftermath of a mysterious pandemic that's turned cities into wastelands, a man desperately searches for a way to cure his ailing wife as she battles a deadly virus. When he is captured by a cryptic stranger, he is offered the chance to save not only his wife but the world.

== Cast ==
- Ivan Sandomire as Chris Towne
- Jamie Jackson as Leader
- Andrew Sensenig as Jim Eldon
- Erin Cunningham as Anna Towne
- Chris Henry Coffey as Whitmore
- Adam David Thompson as Brad
- Amber Davila as Susan

== Reception ==
On the review aggregator website Rotten Tomatoes, 83% of 6 critics' reviews are positive, with an average rating of 7.0/10. Anton Bitel writing on Sight & Sound magazine included the film among the best shown on 2017 Sci-Fi-London. John Higgins from Starburst magazine gave the film 7 out of 10 stars and stated: "Sandomire is very good in the lead role and holds the film together. Overall though, the smartly-written script will have the potential for repeat viewings to try and concoct where and how things unfold at the conclusion. Like last year’s excellent Imitation Girl, Diverge has much more to offer than CGI-action and pyrotechnics. Christopher Llewellyn Reed from Hammer To Nail wrote: "At 85 minutes, Diverge never overstays its welcome, and proves, time and again (remember: time travel), that low-budget science fiction can more than deliver."

Diverge gathered awards and nominations at several festivals, including Lund International Fantastic Film Festival, Boston Science Fiction Film Festival and Julien Dubuque International Film Festival.
