= The Dutchman (2025 film) =

- Release poster
- Directed by: Andre Gaines
- Screenplay by: Qasim Basir; Andre Gaines
- Based on: Dutchman by Amiri Baraka
- Produced by: Jonathan T. Baker; Andre Gaines
- Starring: André Holland; Kate Mara; Zazie Beetz; Stephen McKinley Henderson; Aldis Hodge; Lauren E. Banks
- Cinematography: Frank G. DeMarco
- Edited by: Joel Viertel
- Music by: Daniel Hart
- Production companies: Cinemation Studios; Washington Square Films
- Distributed by: Rogue Pictures; Inaugural Entertainment
- Release dates: March 8, 2025 (SXSW); January 2, 2026 (United States)
- Running time: 88 minutes
- Country: United States
- Language: English

The Dutchman is a 2025 American story within a story thriller film directed by Andre Gaines, co-writing along with Qasim Basir, based on the 1964 play Dutchman by Amiri Baraka and the second screen adaption after the 1966 British movie Dutchman. The film stars André Holland, Kate Mara, Zazie Beetz, Stephen McKinley Henderson, Aldis Hodge, and Lauren E. Banks.

The Dutchman premiered at the 2025 South by Southwest Film & TV Festival on March 8. It was released on January 2, 2026 in the United States by Rogue Pictures and Inaugural Entertainment.

== Plot ==
In New York City, author Dr. Amiri Baraka gives Clay a copy of his play Dutchman with the advice that understanding struggle can lead to freedom. When Clay talks on the phone with his friend Warren while entering the Subway, Amiri uses a magical theater model to transport him into a world with more open racism. The story then covers similar themes as the play, but in different settings.

At the next station Lula stares at Clay, enters his subway car, and strikes up a conversation. Clay remains unsure if anything she says is true, such as her guessing he has a friend named Warren who looks like him. Lula invites herself to the party he's attending. They exit together and go to her apartment where she seduces him.

After having sex, Clay notices the same theater model in Lula’s apartment that he saw earlier at Amiri’s place. They get into an argument. When Clay walks out the door, she screams loud enough for the neighbors to hear. She then threatens to use the contents of a condom to accuse him of rape if he doesn't take her to the party.

Lula, the only white person at the party, insults the guests with racist comments. When Clay asks one of them, his wife Kaya, about the conversation, they end up rehashing an argument about her infidelity.

As Lula gets more out of control, Warren asks Clay to remove her for “murdering the vibe”. Instead, Clay has an existential crisis, questioning what he got for living his life according to plan and never fucking up.

Clay introduces city councilor Warren, who plans a project to improve Harlem. When Lula threatens to interrupt the speech, Clay runs away. She follows, screams for the police, and gets him arrested. In jail, Amiri, in the next cell, gives him advice before Kaya bails him out. They argue and she leaves.

On the way home, Clay ends up in a full-scale version of the theater with a shelf full of copies of the play and realizes that Lula’s words are in the text verbatim. Amiri appears and tells him that she is his darkest thoughts manifest. They discuss whether Clay has to die like the character in the play.

Clay enters the subway to continue the story. Lula magically appears and tries to have sex with him. When he refuses, she makes a scene. He threatens her and demands she let him be the black man he is. When he tries to get off the train, she attacks him with a knife. In a departure from the play, Clay stabs her instead. Two police officers board and arrest him despite a black eyewitness proclaiming his innocence. When she shows a video of the attack on her phone, the cops relent. Clay walks home in sunshine and makes up with Kaya.

== Cast ==
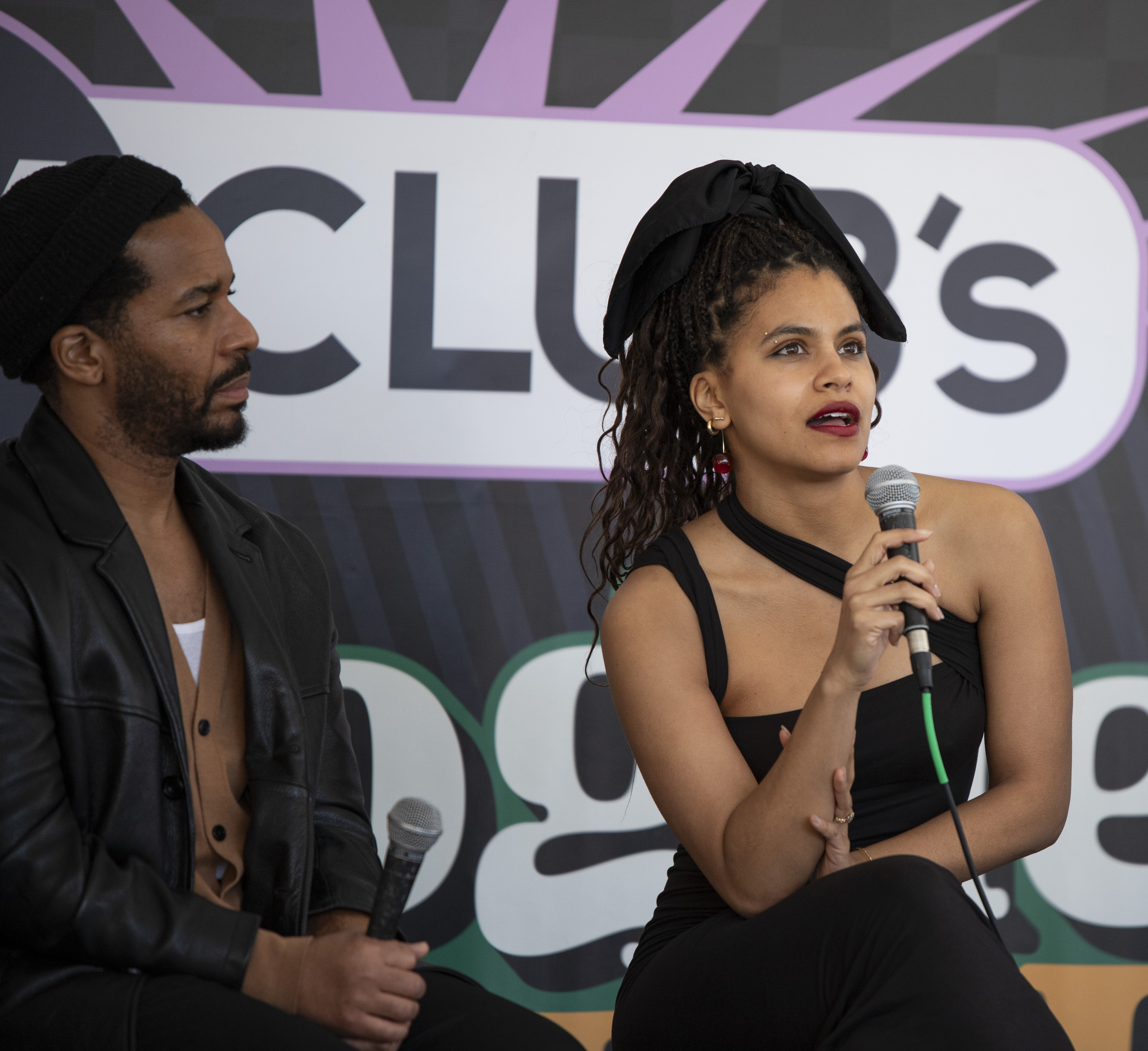
André Holland (left) and Zazie Beetz (right) promoting the film at South by Southwest 2025

- André Holland as Clay
- Kate Mara as Lula
- Zazie Beetz as Kaya
- Stephen McKinley Henderson as Dr. Amiri
- Aldis Hodge as Warren
- Lauren E. Banks as Gina
- Lenny Platt as Officer Barnes
- Tracy Wilder as Dr. Bowers
- Benjamin Thys as Officer Davis
- Shonica Gooden as Zara
- Lazarus Simmons as Malik
- Sally Stewart as Mystic Lady
- Tony Torn as Janitor
- Kevin Tyler Rodriguez as Officer Luis
- Hyunmin Rhee as Officer Kim
- Michael Lawrence as Bradford Easley

== Production ==
In September 2023, it was reported that Andre Gaines was set to direct, write, and produce The Dutchman, a feature film adaptation of the 1964 play Dutchman by Amiri Baraka. The film was secured by SAG-AFTRA to start filming with an interim agreement during the 2023 SAG-AFTRA strike. André Holland, Kate Mara, Zazie Beetz, and Stephen McKinley Henderson were announced as being cast. Filming began on September 25, 2023 in New York City and included challenging shoots on an operable subway train. Aldis Hodge and Lauren E. Banks were added to the cast in October. In February 2025, Chris K. Daniels and Jess Mastro of The Launch Company came on board as executive producers for the film.

Director Andre Gaines has said that the Baraka play had "stuck with him" since his first experience of it, and that he thought the themes and story are still very relevant.

== Release ==
The film premiered at the 2025 South by Southwest Film & TV Festival on March 8. In November 2025, Rogue Pictures and Inaugural Entertainment acquired distribution rights to the film, giving it a theatrical release in the United States on January 2, 2026.

== Reception ==
On the review aggregator website Rotten Tomatoes, 59% of 39 critics' reviews are positive. The website's consensus reads: "Despite strong aesthetics and Andre Holland's richly textured performance, The Dutchman unfolds as a muddled reworking of the stage play that fails to find thematic coherence and a sense of identity.
