= Sarai Walker =

American writer

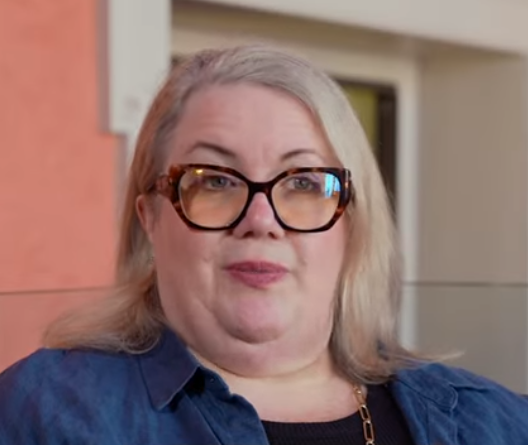
- In a 2026 interview
- Education: Bennington College; University of London
- Occupation: Writer
- Website: www.saraiwalker.com

Sarai Walker is an American writer whose book Dietland was identified as one of Entertainment Weekly's 10 Best books of 2015, and has subsequently been turned into a TV series. She has published articles in The New York Times, The Washington Post, The Guardian, and Refinery29. Walker is a fat positive activist and her writings reflect an attempt to reclaim the word fat as a mere bodily description—like tall or short.

== Life and education ==
Walker grew up in California and Utah, and is now based in New Mexico. Walker received her M.F.A. in creative writing from Bennington College, and her Ph.D. in English from the University of London (2005). Walker started out writing at teen and women's magazines, and later wrote for Our Bodies, Ourselves.

== Fat Acceptance Movement and activism ==
Walker is an adamant supporter of rights and dignity for fat people. As such, she frequently speaks on the assumptions others make about her life because of her body. Ranging from assuming the types of exercises, or lack thereof, to the type of diet she eats, Walker is adamant that people can be healthy at any size and that the mistreatment of her body is a political issue.

Walker also believes that literature has not adequately written about fat women. Her first encounters of fat characters in film always embodied somewhat of a tragedy. If it was murder out of jealousy, being the selfless friend to the beautiful leading character by helping him/her "grow" as a person, or embarking on a desperate journey of losing weight out of self-hatred. Fat people in film usually carried sadness and pity within themselves. Dietland was thus an attempt to cover some of the missing elements in American literature that pertain to fat women. Plum, the main character in Dietland, is a 300-pound woman. Walker also specifically wanted to emphasize that fatness is not always a sign that a person has had trauma, stripping the definition of fatness from its common connotations, and specifically attempting to remove the fundamental stereotype that fat is synonymous with unhealthy. Naming the phenomenon of those who refuse to think fat people can be healthy, Fat Derangement Syndrome, Walker proposes that individuals often do not look at actual scientific studies in regards to the health of fat people, but are more so operating on societal de-valuing of fat people. Walker has publicly stated that London (where she lived for seven years for grad school) was the most fat shaming city she has ever lived in.

In addition to her participation in the Fat Acceptance Movement, Walker is also a feminist and frequently criticizes the objectification of women, and violence against women. She is also clear that she does not write characters that are "perfect women." As an act of feminism, in fact, she purposefully does not concern herself with likeability issues for her characters, and focuses instead on making characters that are accurately flawed. As such, she creates characters that do not fit into the conventions of likeable womanhood (i.e. skinny and kind), and instead writers characters that do not fit neatly into any category.

== Works ==
- 2015 : Dietland, Atlantic Books
- 2021 : The Cherry Robbers, Harper Books
- 2026: Furious Violet
