= Amy York Rubin =

American writer and director

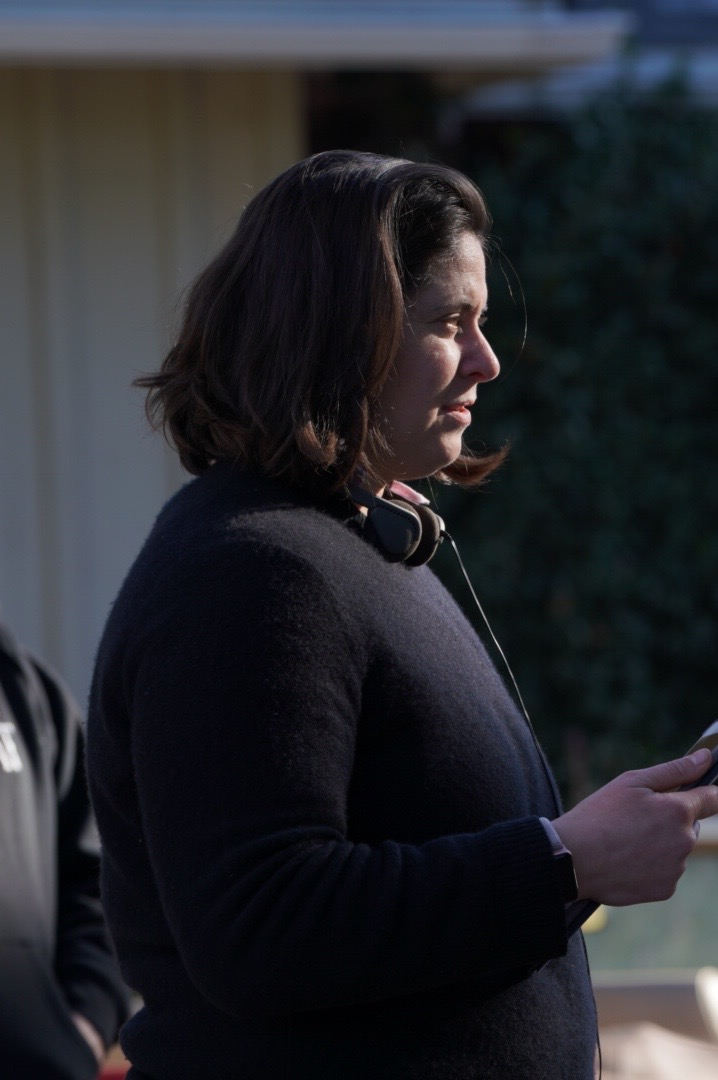
- Rubin in 2017
- Born: United States
- Occupations: Director; writer; producer

Amy York Rubin is an American writer and director. She has directed multiple episodes of television series, including the award-winning pilot of the Netflix series Dead to Me.

Rubin began her career in comedy. She wrote, created and directed the web series Little Horribles (2013). The Huffington Post called the series "the lesbian answer to Girls. The New York Times reviewed the series positively. Little Horribles won for Best Indie Series at the 4th Streamy Awards.

Since then, Amy has served as a director for numerous projects, including the pilot and episodes of Love, Victor, Dietland, Superstore, Angie Tribeca, Casual, I'm Sorry, Fresh Off The Boat, SMILF and more.

== Filmography ==
=== Film ===
Year	Title	Director	Writer	Producer	References
TBA	Gay Kid and Fat Chick	Yes	No	—N/a	

=== Television ===
Year	Title	Director	Producer	Role	Notes
2015	Looking	No	No	Meredith	3 episodes
2016 – 2017	Foursome	Yes	Yes	No	11 episodes
2017	Casual	Yes	No	No	2 episodes
2017	I'm Sorry	Yes	No	No	3 episodes
2017	SMILF	Yes	No	No	2 episodes
2018	The Mick	Yes	No	No	1 episode
2018	Fresh Off the Boat	Yes	No	No	1 episode
2018	Grown-ish	Yes	No	No	1 episode
2018	Alone Together	Yes	No	No	1 episode
2018	Dietland	Yes	No	No	2 episode
2018	Wrecked	Yes	No	No	1 episode
2019	Dead to Me	Yes	No	No	2 episodes
2020	Love, Victor	Yes	No	No	Episode: "Welcome to Creekwood"
2022	So Help Me Todd	Yes	Yes	No	Episode: "Pilot"

=== Web ===
Year	Title	Role	Notes
2013	Little Horribles	Amy	Also director, writer and producer
