= City on a Hill (TV series) =

American crime drama television series

- Genre: Crime drama
- Created by: Chuck MacLean
- Starring: Kevin Bacon; Aldis Hodge; Jonathan Tucker; Mark O'Brien; Lauren E. Banks; Amanda Clayton; Jere Shea; Kevin Chapman; Jill Hennessy
- Composer: Kevin Kiner
- Country of origin: United States
- Original language: English
- No. of seasons: 3
- No. of episodes: 26

Production
- Executive producers: Chuck MacLean; Tom Fontana; Ben Affleck; Matt Damon; Jennifer Todd; James Mangold; Barry Levinson; Michael Cuesta; Aldis Hodge; Kevin Bacon
- Production locations: New York City, New York; Boston, Massachusetts; Los Angeles, California (pilot)
- Running time: 55–58 minutes
- Production companies: Pearl Street Films; The Levinson/Fontana Company; Little Mountain Films

Original release
- Network: Showtime
- Release: June 16, 2019 – September 25, 2022

City on a Hill is an American crime drama television series created by Charlie MacLean, based on a story by Ben Affleck and MacLean. The series stars Kevin Bacon, Aldis Hodge, Amanda Clayton, Cathy Moriarty, Kevin Dunn, and Jill Hennessy. The series premiered online on June 7, 2019 and June 16, 2019 on the linear Showtime network. On August 2, 2019, Showtime renewed the series for a second season, which premiered on March 28, 2021. On June 2, 2021, the series was renewed for a third season, which began on July 31, 2022. On October 27, 2022, Showtime canceled the series after three seasons.

== Cast ==
=== Main ===
- Kevin Bacon as Retired FBI Agent John "Jackie" Rohr
- Aldis Hodge as Assistant District Attorney DeCourcy Ward
- Jonathan Tucker as Francis "Frankie" Ryan
- Mark O'Brien as James "Jimmy" Ryan (Season 1-2)
- Lauren E. Banks as Siobhan Quay
- Amanda Clayton as Catherine "Cathy" Ryan
- Jere Shea as Massachusetts State Police Sergeant Hank Signa
- Kevin Chapman as Boston P.D. Detective J.R. "Dickie" Minogue
- Jill Hennessy as Jennifer "Jenny" Rohr
- Matthew Del Negro as Boston P.D. Detective Chris Caysen

=== Recurring ===
- Cathy Moriarty as Dottie Ryan, Frankie and Jimmy's Mother
- Rory Culkin as Clay Roach
- Kevin Dunn as District Attorney Nathan Rey
- Vincent Elbaz as Boston Police Officer Hugo Rhys
- Zoe Colletti (Season 1) and Lucia Ryan (Season 2) as Benedetta "Benny" Rohr, Jackie and Jenny's Daughter
- Mark Ryder as Father Diarmuid Doyle
- Sarah Shahi as Rachel Benham
- Jimmy Cummings as Tommy Hayes
- Sharon Washington as Shirley Hanlon
- Georgina Reilly as Corie Struthers
- James Remar as Richard "Richy" Ryan, Frankie and Jimmy's Father
- Gloria Reuben as Eloise Hastings, Siobhan's Mother
- Kathryn Erbe as Sue Stanton
- Charles Brice as Louie Ward, DeCourcy's Brother and Louie's Father
- Ernie Hudson as Franklin Ward, DeCourcy's father
- Corbin Bernsen as Sinclair Dryden, Jackie's mentor
- Joanne Kelly as Letitia Dryden, Sinclair's wife
- Michael O'Keefe as Salvy Clasby
- Seth Gilliam as Reverend Jasper Fields
- Lee Tergesen as Vito "The Pig" Lupo
- Amr Elsheikh as Moustafa Mody
- Gary Perez as Felix Knight
- Shannon Wallace as Anton Campbell

== Episodes ==
Season	Episodes	Originally released	
Season	Episodes	First released	Last released
1	10	June 7, 2019 (online); June 16, 2019 (Showtime)	August 18, 2019
2	8	March 28, 2021	May 16, 2021
3	8	July 31, 2022	September 25, 2022

=== Season 1 (2019) ===
No. overall	No. in season	Title	Directed by	Written by	Original release date	U.S. viewers (millions)
1	1	"The Night Flynn Sent the Cops on the Ice"	Michael Cuesta	Chuck MacLean	June 7, 2019 (online); June 16, 2019 (Showtime)	0.532
2	2	"What They Saw in Southie High"	Ed Bianchi	Chuck MacLean	June 23, 2019	0.446
3	3	"If Only the Fool Would Persist in His Folly"	Christoph Schrewe	Emily Ragsdale	June 30, 2019	0.409
4	4	"The Wickedness of the Wicked Shall Be Upon Himself"	Hagar Ben-Asher	J.M. Holmes	July 7, 2019	0.411
5	5	"From Injustice Came the Way to Describe Justice"	Alex Zakrzewski	Michele McPhee	July 14, 2019	0.459
6	6	"It's Hard to Be a Saint in the City"	Metin Hüseyin	Jorge Zamacona	July 21, 2019	0.406
7	7	"There Are No Fucking Sides"	Kyra Sedgwick	Emily Ragsdale & J.M. Holmes	July 28, 2019	0.534
8	8	"High on the Looming Gallows Tree"	Clark Johnson	Stephen Day	August 4, 2019	0.601
9	9	"The Deaf Sage of Pompeii"	Adam Bernstein	Matthew Nemeth	August 11, 2019	0.555
10	10	"Mayor Curley and the Last Hurrah"	Christoph Schrewe	Chuck MacLean	August 18, 2019	0.569

=== Season 2 (2021) ===
No. overall	No. in season	Title	Directed by	Written by	Original release date	U.S. viewers (millions)
11	1	"Bill Russell's Bedsheets"	Kevin Bacon	Chuck MacLean	March 28, 2021	0.372
12	2	"I Need a Goat"	Ed Bianchi	Tamara P. Carter	April 4, 2021	0.353
13	3	"Is the Total Black, Being Spoken"	Benny Boom and Hagar Ben-Asher	J.M. Holmes	April 11, 2021	0.347
14	4	"Overtime White and Overtime Stupid"	Benny Boom	Regina Porter	April 18, 2021	0.372
15	5	"East of Eden"	Christoph Schrewe	Jorge Zamacona	April 25, 2021	0.308
16	6	"Don't Go Sayin Last Words"	Christoph Schrewe	Emily Ragsdale	May 2, 2021	0.426
17	7	"Apophasis"	Clark Johnson	Matthew Nemeth	May 9, 2021	0.471
18	8	"Pax Bostonia"	Clark Johnson	Jorge Zamacona & Haley Cameron	May 16, 2021	0.382

=== Season 3 (2022) ===
No. overall	No. in season	Title	Directed by	Written by	Original release date	U.S. viewers (millions)
19	1	"Gods and Monsters"	Christoph Schrewe	Jorge Zamacona	July 31, 2022	0.244
20	2	"A Program of Complete Disorder"	Christoph Schrewe	J.M. Holmes	August 7, 2022	0.199
21	3	"Speak When You're Angry"	Marshall Tyler	Emily Ragsdale	August 14, 2022	0.207
22	4	"Ugly, Like I Said"	Marshall Tyler	Tamara P. Carter	August 28, 2022	0.289
23	5	"Take Me Home"	Hagar Ben-Asher	Haley Cameron	September 4, 2022	0.224
24	6	"Tenderness"	Hagar Ben-Asher	Regina Porter	September 11, 2022	0.167
25	7	"Boston Bridges, Falling Down"	Ed Bianchi	Chris Andrien	September 18, 2022	0.258
26	8	"Whipping Post"	Ed Bianchi	Matthew Nemeth	September 25, 2022	0.201

== Production ==
The show was picked up by Showtime in May 2018. Although set in early 1990s Boston, filming primarily took place in New York City, with some external filming in Boston.

== Release ==
The series premiered on June 16, 2019.

== Reception ==
=== Critical response ===
The review aggregator website Rotten Tomatoes reported a 76% approval rating with an average score of 6.9/10, based on 37 reviews. The website's critical consensus reads, "Though City on a Hill's meandering story can't quite match its ambitions, it's entertaining—and even occasionally riveting—to watch Kevin Bacon and company take on bureaucracy." Metacritic, which uses a weighted average, assigned a score of 65 out of 100 based on 22 critics, indicating "generally favorable reviews".

=== Ratings ===
==== Season 1 ====
Viewership and ratings per episode of City on a Hill
No.	Title	Air date	Rating (18–49)	Viewers (millions)	DVR viewers (millions)	Total viewers (millions)
1	"The Night Flynn Sent the Cops on the Ice"	June 16, 2019	0.07	0.532	—N/a	—N/a
2	"What They Saw in Southie High"	June 23, 2019	0.06	0.446	0.584	1.030
3	"If Only the Fool Would Persist in His Folly"	June 30, 2019	0.04	0.409	0.571	0.980
4	"The Wickedness of the Wicked Shall Be Upon Himself"	July 7, 2019	0.06	0.411	0.574	0.985
5	"From Injustice Came the Way to Describe Justice"	July 14, 2019	0.06	0.459	—N/a	—N/a
6	"It's Hard to Be a Saint in the City"	July 21, 2019	0.04	0.406	—N/a	—N/a
7	"There Are No Fucking Sides"	July 28, 2019	0.06	0.534	—N/a	—N/a
8	"High on the Looming Gallows Tree"	August 4, 2019	0.08	0.601	0.573	1.174
9	"The Deaf Sage of Pompeii"	August 11, 2019	0.06	0.555	—N/a	—N/a
10	"Mayor Curley and the Last Hurrah"	August 18, 2019	0.06	0.569	—N/a	—N/a

==== Season 2 ====
Viewership and ratings per episode of City on a Hill
No.	Title	Air date	Rating (18–49)	Viewers (millions)	DVR viewers (millions)	Total viewers (millions)
1	"Bill Russell's Bedsheets"	March 28, 2021	0.06	0.372	—N/a	—N/a
2	"I Need a Goat"	April 4, 2021	0.03	0.353	—N/a	—N/a
3	"Is the Total Black, Being Spoken"	April 11, 2021	0.04	0.347	0.427	0.774
4	"Overtime White and Overtime Stupid"	April 18, 2021	0.05	0.372	0.404	0.776
5	"East of Eden"	April 25, 2021	0.03	0.308	0.358	0.666
6	"Don't Go Sayin Last Words"	May 2, 2021	0.03	0.426	0.372	0.798
7	"Apophasis"	May 9, 2021	0.07	0.471	0.420	0.891
8	"Pax Bostonia"	May 16, 2021	0.03	0.382	0.387	0.769

==== Season 3 ====
Viewership and ratings per episode of City on a Hill
No.	Title	Air date	Rating (18–49)	Viewers (millions)	DVR viewers (millions)	Total viewers (millions)
1	"Gods and Monsters"	July 31, 2022	0.06	0.244	TBD	TBD
2	"A Program of Complete Disorder"	August 7, 2022	0.02	0.199	TBD	TBD
3	"Speak When You're Angry"	August 14, 2022	0.03	0.207	TBD	TBD
4	"Ugly, Like I Said"	August 28, 2022	0.08	0.289	TBD	TBD
5	"Take Me Home"	September 4, 2022	0.07	0.224	TBD	TBD
6	"Tenderness"	September 11, 2022	0.00	0.167	TBD	TBD
7	"Boston Bridges, Falling Down"	September 18, 2022	0.04	0.258	TBD	TBD
8	"Whipping Post"	September 25, 2022	0.01	0.201	TBD	TBD
