= Jennifer Mudge =

American actress

- Occupation: Actress
- Years active: 2003–present
- Spouse: Chris Henry Coffey (m. 2014)

Jennifer Mudge is an American television and stage actress.

== Stage work ==
Mudge attended Rhode Island College and trained at the conservatory program at Trinity Repertory Company, where she received her Master of Fine Arts in Acting.

Mudge made her screen debut in a 2003 episode of Hack. She made her off-Broadway debut in 2003 at the 59E59 Theaters, in a production of The Stendhal Syndrome by Terrence McNally, starring Richard Thomas and Isabella Rossellini. Since then she has appeared on Broadway in The Philanthropist with Matthew Broderick and Steven Weber, and off-Broadway as Lula in Dutchman (play) with Dulé Hill (Drama Desk Awards Nomination: Outstanding Actress in a Play) Fault Lines with Josh Lucas and Noah Emmerich; The Geometry of Fire; The Pavilion; Only the End of the World with Michael Emerson; Ooorah! at the Atlantic Theatre Company; The Big Meal at Playwrights Horizons; and Don't Go Gentle with Michael Cristofer.

She played the part of Debra Whitehead in Season 1 of Boss in 2011.

In 2014 she portrayed "Gloria" in the Broadway production of Rocky, an original role written specifically for the production; this was followed by a reunion with Fiasco Theatre in a re-mounted production of Into the Woods in 2014 and 2015 for Roundabout Theatre, reprising the role of "The Witch," for which she was nominated for a Lucille Lortel Awards - Best Leading Actress in a Musical. This was followed by the Manhattan Theatre Club production of "Of Good Stock" with Alicia Silverstone.

She married actor Chris Henry Coffey in 2014.

Since its inception in 2019, she has been involved in a number of productions with Molière in the Park. These include the inaugural event, The Misanthrope 2020, Tartuffe 2020, The Learned Ladies, and more.
