= Andre Gaines =

American film producer, director and financier

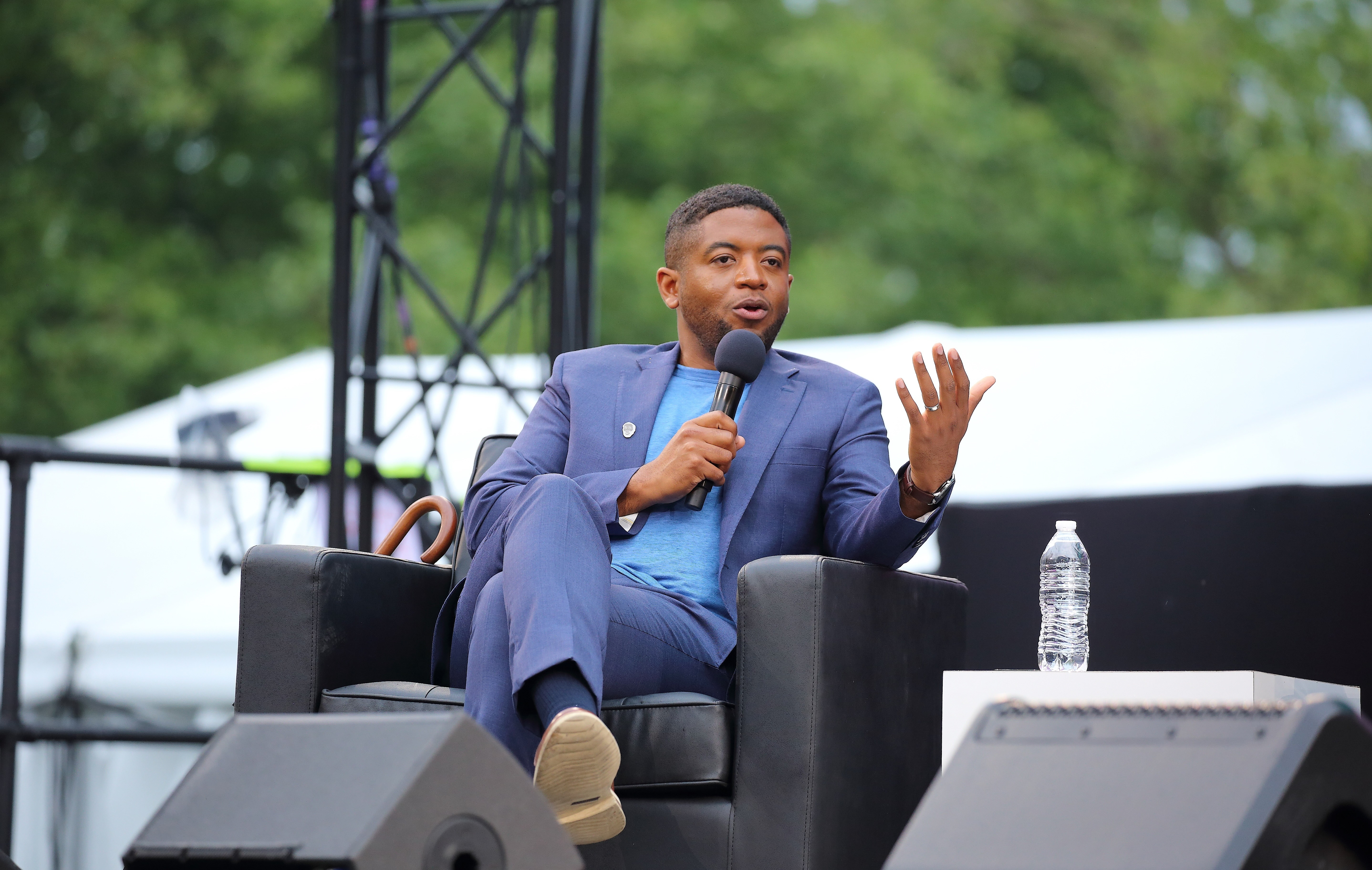
- Andre Gaines at the Tribeca Film Festival on June 19, 2021.
- Born: Toledo, Ohio
- Occupation: Film producer

Andre Gaines is a Los Angeles-based producer, writer and director. Through his company Cinemation Studios, Gaines has produced or financed an extensive number of documentary and narrative films including Da Sweet Blood of Jesus by Spike Lee, the acclaimed Netflix documentary Bill Nye: Science Guy, the remake of Children of the Corn written by Stephen King, and the animated feature The Immortal Warrior starring Rodrigo Santoro for Amazon. He produced and directed The One and Only Dick Gregory (2021) for Showtime, which premiered at the Tribeca Film Festival. He also executive produced the critically-acclaimed HBO documentary series The Lady and the Dale.

== Early life and education ==
Gaines was born in Toledo, Ohio. He received a dual major in chemistry and journalism from Northwestern University, and an MFA from New York University Tisch School of the Arts.

== Career ==
In 2020, Gaines produced the reboot of Stephen King’s Children of the Corn in Queensland, Australia. The project was one of only two movies filming at the time amidst the global Covid-19 pandemic shut down. The protocols set forth by Gaines, producer Lucas Foster, and other crew served as the guidebook for all filming during the pandemic.

In 2021, alongside Mark Duplass and Jay Duplass, Andre executive produced the HBO Documentary Films four-part documentary series, The Lady and the Dale. Dubbed as a “superb portrait” by The Hollywood Reporter and Certified Fresh on Rotten Tomatoes, The Lady and the Dale is a genre-bending documentary that traces the audacious story of Elizabeth Carmichael, a larger-than-life automobile executive, who as one of the first openly transgender women, rose to prominence during the 1970s oil crisis with her promotion of a fuel-efficient, three-wheeled car called The Dale. The series was nominated for a Film Independent Spirit Award for Best New Non-Scripted or Documentary Series.

Gaines also made his feature documentary debut in 2021 at the Tribeca Film Festival, and later on Showtime, with the Emmy®-nominated film The One and Only Dick Gregory about the legendary comedian and activist. Featuring talent such as Chris Rock, Dave Chappelle, Kevin Hart, Wanda Sykes, W. Kamau Bell, and Harry Belafonte, the film scored 100% on Rotten Tomatoes, with The Wall Street Journal calling it “a memorable portrait of someone whose story deserves to be better remembered,” and Richard Roeper of the Chicago Sun-Times calling it “rock-solid.” Gaines went on to garner nominations for an NAACP Image Award for Outstanding Directing, an IDA Award for Best Writing, and invitations to lecture at USC School of Cinematic Arts, NYU, Harry Belafonte’s Action Lab, and the Schomburg Center for Research in Black Culture in Harlem.

Alongside executive producers LeBron James and Stanley Nelson, Gaines garnered his second Emmy®-nomination for executive producing and directing the film After Jackie for The History Channel about the heroics of Black ballplayers Curt Flood, Bob Gibson and William White who advanced racial equality in Major League Baseball after Jackie Robinson retired.

Other notable productions include the HBO series The Anarchists, and Paramount+ Alive in Bronze and Angola Do You Hear Us? Voices from a Plantation Prison, which was shortlisted for an Academy Award® for Best Documentary Short Film. Gaines recently wrapped production on Triumph: Jesse Owens and the Berlin Olympics, executive produced by LeBron James and narrated by Don Cheadle for The History Channel, and is currently directing and producing a biography on late sportscaster Stuart Scott for ESPN.

Gaines made his feature film directorial debut with The Dutchman, an adaptation of Amiri Baraka’s Obie Award winning 1964 play. The film stars André Holland, Kate Mara, Zazie Beetz, Stephen McKinley Henderson and Aldis Hodge. Gaines and his wife Lauren Dandridge live in Los Angeles.

Gaines founded Cinemation Studios in 2010. In 2022, Gaines and his production company signed with UTA.

== Filmography ==
- Ladder to Damascus (2013)
- Rio 2096: A Story of Love and Fury (2013)
- Brazilian Western (2013)
- The Purple Onion (2014; executive producer)
- Da Sweet Blood of Jesus (2014; executive producer)
- Bricks in Motion (2016; executive producer)
- Bill Nye: Science Guy (2017; executive producer)
- The Immortal Warrior (2020; producer)
- Children of the Corn (2020; executive producer)
- The Lady and the Dale (2021; executive producer)
- The One and Only Dick Gregory (2021; producer, writer, director)
- Glorious Empire (2021; producer)
- The Dutchman (2025; director, writer, producer)

== Cinemation Partnerships/Investments ==
- Status Pro
- Maestro Media
- Dragonfire
- Delphi Interactive
