= Hampton House Motel =

Museum and cultural center

- U.S. National Register of Historic Places
- U.S. National Historic Landmark
- Location within Florida
- Location: 4240 NW 27th Ave., Miami, Florida
- Coordinates: 25°48′51″N 80°14′27″W
- Area: less than one acre
- NRHP reference No.: 100007393
- Added to NRHP: February 7, 2022

The Hampton House Motel, now operating as Historic Hampton House Motel museum and cultural center, is a historic former lodging facility in the Brownsville neighborhood of Miami, Florida. The motel served Black patrons during segregation in the American South. It was designated as a National Historic Landmark in February 2023.

== History ==
The Booker Terrace Motel opened in 1954 to satisfy Miami's growing need for lodging facilities for African Americans. The building was purchased by Jewish couple, Harry and Florence Markowitz, who remodeled the existing hotel into the Hampton House Motel, which opened in 1961. The remodeled Hampton House Motel was designed by architect Robert Karl Frese in the Miami Modern architecture style.

Throughout the 1960s, the Hampton House Motel hosted many prominent Civil Rights leaders, athletes, and musicians, including Martin Luther King Jr., Malcolm X, Muhammad Ali, Sammy Davis Jr., Sam Cooke, Nat King Cole, Jackie Robinson, and Joe Louis.

Documents have revealed that Martin Luther King Jr. delivered an early version of his I Have A Dream speech at the motel.

== Restoration efforts ==
The Hampton House Motel closed in 1976 and remained abandoned until the early 2000s. Threatened with demolition, a local advocacy group worked to declare its block a historic district in 2002, and the building was eventually purchased by Miami-Dade county. Beginning in 2015, the building began a $6 million restoration project with plans to open a museum, community center, cafe, jazz club, and gift shop.

== Museum and cultural center ==
The restored motel now operates as the Historic Hampton House Motel, a nonprofit organization, museum, and cultural center. It is one of the few remaining Green Book sites of the Jim Crow era and serves as a museum to the Green Book.

== National Historic Landmark status ==
Hampton House Motel was declared a National Historic Landmark in February 2023.

== In popular culture ==
The hotel serves as the site of a fictional meeting between Muhammad Ali, Malcolm X, Sam Cooke, and Jim Brown in the 2020 film One Night in Miami.
