= One Night in Miami... =

2020 film by Regina King

- Release poster
- Directed by: Regina King
- Screenplay by: Kemp Powers
- Based on: One Night in Miami by Kemp Powers
- Produced by: Jess Wu Calder; Keith Calder; Jody Klein
- Starring: Kingsley Ben-Adir; Eli Goree; Aldis Hodge; Leslie Odom Jr.
- Cinematography: Tami Reiker
- Edited by: Tariq Anwar
- Music by: Terence Blanchard
- Production companies: ABKCO; Snoot Entertainment; Royal Ties Productions; Germano Studios; Hit Factory; Capital Studios
- Distributed by: Amazon Studios
- Release dates: September 7, 2020 (Venice); December 25, 2020 (United States)
- Running time: 114 minutes
- Country: United States
- Language: English
- Budget: $16.9 million

One Night in Miami... is a 2020 American drama film directed by Regina King (in her feature film directorial debut) from a screenplay by Kemp Powers, based on his 2013 stage play. The film is a fictionalized account of a meeting on February 25, 1964, between Malcolm X, Muhammad Ali, Jim Brown, and Sam Cooke in a room at the Hampton House, celebrating Ali's surprise title win over Sonny Liston. It stars Kingsley Ben-Adir, Eli Goree, Aldis Hodge, and Leslie Odom Jr. in the lead roles, with Lance Reddick, Joaquina Kalukango, Nicolette Robinson, and Beau Bridges in supporting roles.

One Night in Miami premiered at the 77th Venice International Film Festival on September 7, 2020, a first for an African-American female director. The film was released in select theaters in the United States by Amazon Studios on December 25, 2020, before being released digitally on Amazon Prime Video on January 15, 2021. It received praise for King's direction, the performances (particularly from Ben-Adir and Odom), and Powers's screenplay. The film earned three nominations at the 93rd Academy Awards: Best Supporting Actor for Odom, Best Adapted Screenplay, and Best Original Song ("Speak Now"). King also earned nominations for the Golden Globe Award for Best Director and the Critics Choice Award for Best Director.

== Plot ==
In 1963, Cassius Clay nearly loses a boxing match to Henry Cooper at Wembley Stadium in London. At the Copacabana in New York City, soul singer Sam Cooke suffers through a performance in front of a cold, all-white audience. Returning home to Georgia, NFL player Jim Brown is received by family friend Mr. Carlton on a vast plantation. Carlton ladles praise on "the great Jim Brown," but when Brown offers to help Carlton move some furniture, Carlton uses a racial slur and informs Brown that he is not welcome inside the home due to Brown's blackness. Elsewhere, Malcolm X returns home and discusses his plans to leave the Nation of Islam with his wife, Betty.

On February 25, 1964, the men are all in Miami for Clay's title bout against Sonny Liston. Malcolm meets with Clay in a hotel room before the fight, and the two pray in a traditional Islamic fashion. That night, Brown is a ringside commentator and Cooke and Malcolm X are in the crowd as Clay upsets Liston, making him the world heavyweight champion.

Afterward, Malcolm invites the other three men to his motel room. Their hopes of a party are dashed when Malcolm makes it clear they are the only ones he invited. He wants to spend some time reflecting on their accomplishments, but tension between him and Cooke arises. Malcolm accuses Cooke of disloyalty to the black community by pandering to white audiences, and Cooke argues that his method produces greater economic empowerment for black artists. Clay informs the men of his plans to announce his conversion to the Nation of Islam, causing more tension. Brown discusses his plans to become a film actor, and wonders if it will go smoothly.

The conflict between Malcolm and Cooke escalates. Malcolm harshly ridicules the music Cooke has produced since finding success. Cooke insists his success and creative autonomy is itself an inspiration to the black community, and while he still cares about the black struggle in America, protest songs are not commercially viable. Malcolm confronts him with the success of Bob Dylan's "Blowin' in the Wind" and asks Cooke how he feels about the fact that a white man has written a more successful song about racism than any that Cooke has made.

As they argue, it becomes clear that Malcolm's antagonism of Cooke is motivated, at least in part, by the activist's stress over his own life, especially his harassment by the FBI and fears about his schism with Elijah Muhammad. Malcolm is devastated to learn that Clay is having second thoughts about his conversion. He tells Clay that he is planning to form his own organization and asks him to join. Clay refuses, feeling betrayed by his mentor, and wondering if his conversion has been a ploy by Malcolm to attract attention to his new project. A knock at the door informs them that the press has gotten wind of the meeting. As Clay prepares to talk to the media, he asks Malcolm to come with him. When they leave, Cooke tells Brown that he has had similar thoughts about "Blowin' in the Wind" and has already written a song, but not yet performed it.

In the aftermath of the night, Clay officially changes his name to Muhammad Ali, while Malcolm's life is thrown into chaos as he suffers the consequences of his split with the Nation of Islam; his house is firebombed, but he completes his autobiography. Cooke debuts "A Change Is Gonna Come" on The Tonight Show. Brown leaves the NFL to pursue his movie career. The film ends with a title card with a quote from Malcolm on February 19, 1965, about the inevitability of martyrs for the cause, and that he was assassinated two days later on February 21.

== Cast ==
- Kingsley Ben-Adir as Malcolm X
- Eli Goree as Cassius Clay
- Aldis Hodge as Jim Brown
- Leslie Odom Jr. as Sam Cooke
- Lance Reddick as Brother Kareem
- Christian Magby as Jamaal
- Joaquina Kalukango as Betty X
- Nicolette Robinson as Barbara Cooke
- Michael Imperioli as Angelo Dundee
- Lawrence Gilliard Jr. as Drew Bundini Brown
- Beau Bridges as Mr. Carlton. He is based on a real acquaintance of Brown's, who made him stay on the porch of his house and would not let him inside because he is black, as depicted in the film, and written about in Brown's autobiography.
- Emily Bridges as Emily Carlton
- Jeremy Pope as Jackie Wilson
- Christopher Gorham as Johnny Carson
- Jerome A. Wilson as Elijah Muhammad
- Amondre D. Jackson as L.C. Cooke, Sam's brother
- Aaron D. Alexander as Sonny Liston
- Randall Newsome as Myron Cohen
- Alan Wells as Ed McMahon
- Sean Monaghan as Henry Cooper

== Production ==
=== Development ===
In July 2019, Deadline Hollywood reported Regina King would direct and executive produce filming Powers' screenplay. In January 2020, King announced the casting of Kingsley Ben-Adir, Eli Goree, Aldis Hodge, Leslie Odom Jr., and Lance Reddick in the lead roles.

=== Filming ===
Principal photography began in January 2020, in New Orleans, Louisiana.

=== Music ===
In September 2020, Odom said he had co-written the original song for the film, "Speak Now" with Sam Ashworth. The official lyric video and single for "Speak Now" was released January 5, 2021. On January 20, 2021, the official music video for "Speak Now" featuring Odom was launched.

== Release ==
The film had its world premiere at the 77th Venice International Film Festival on September 7, 2020. It also screened at the 2020 Toronto International Film Festival, where it was the runner-up for the People's Choice Award. It has screened or been scheduled to screen at film festivals in Zurich, London, the Hamptons, Mill Valley, Middleburg, Chicago and Montclair.

Amazon Studios acquired worldwide distribution rights to the film in July 2020. It was announced for a limited theatrical release in the United States on December 25, 2020, followed by its streaming release on Amazon Prime Video on January 15. The film premiered on December 25, only exclusively at the Landmark Theatre at Merrick Park in Miami, before further expanding to select nationwide theaters on January 8, 2021, the week prior to its streaming release.

=== Home media ===
In March 2021, it was announced that One Night in Miami... would be released on DVD and Blu-ray by The Criterion Collection. In September, Criterion confirmed their edition of the film would be released on December 7, 2021.

== Reception ==
=== Critical response ===
On review aggregator Rotten Tomatoes, the film holds an approval rating of 98% based on 345 reviews, with an average rating of 8.3/10. The website's critics consensus reads: "A hauntingly powerful reflection on larger-than-life figures, One Night in Miami finds Regina King in command of her craft in her feature directorial debut." On Metacritic, it has a weighted average score of 83 out of 100, based on 51 critics, indicating "universal acclaim".

Kate Erbland of IndieWire gave the film an "A−" and said that "Yes, One Night in Miami often looks like the play it's based on, but King and her stars make the most of any stage-y limitations, and the filmmaker frequently turns her eye to well-assembled overhead shots and a graceful use of mirrors to keep her many characters in the frame all at once." Owen Gleiberman of Variety praised the characters and the film's parallels to modern day, writing: "One Night in Miami is a casually entrancing debate about power on the part of those who have won it but are still figuring out what to do with it."

According to Aldis Hodge, he heard "through the grapevine" that Jim Brown—the only subject of the film alive at the time of the film's release—liked the film and approved of Hodge's portrayal of him.

=== Accolades ===
Award	Date of ceremony	Category	Recipient(s)	Result	Ref.
Academy Awards	April 25, 2021	Best Supporting Actor	Leslie Odom Jr.	Nominated	
Academy Awards	April 25, 2021	Best Adapted Screenplay	Kemp Powers	Nominated	
Academy Awards	April 25, 2021	Best Original Song	Leslie Odom Jr. and Sam Ashworth	Nominated	
AAFCA Awards	April 7, 2021	Best Director	Regina King	Won	
AAFCA Awards	April 7, 2021	Best Ensemble		Won	
AAFCA Awards	April 7, 2021	Best Screenplay	Kemp Powers	Won	
American Film Institute Awards	February 26, 2021	Top 10 Movie of the Year		Won	
Alliance of Women Film Journalists Awards	January 4, 2021	Best Picture		Nominated	
Alliance of Women Film Journalists Awards	January 4, 2021	Best Director	Regina King	Nominated	
Alliance of Women Film Journalists Awards	January 4, 2021	Best Woman Director	Regina King	Nominated	
Alliance of Women Film Journalists Awards	January 4, 2021	Best Supporting Actor	Leslie Odom Jr.	Won	
Alliance of Women Film Journalists Awards	January 4, 2021	Best Writing, Adapted Screenplay	Kemp Powers	Nominated	
Alliance of Women Film Journalists Awards	January 4, 2021	Best Ensemble	Kimberly Hardin	Won	
Alliance of Women Film Journalists Awards	January 4, 2021	Best Cinematography	Tami Reiker	Nominated	
Alliance of Women Film Journalists Awards	January 4, 2021	Best Editing	Tariq Anwar	Nominated	
BET Awards	June 27, 2021	Best Movie		Nominated	
BET Awards	June 27, 2021	Best Actor	Aldis Hodge	Nominated	
British Academy Film Awards	April 10, 2021	Best Actor in a Supporting Role	Leslie Odom Jr.	Nominated	
Casting Society of America	April 15, 2021	Feature Studio or Independent – Drama	Kimberly R. Hardin and Tracy Kilpatrick	Won	
Chicago Film Critics Association Awards	December 21, 2020	Best Supporting Actor	Leslie Odom Jr.	Nominated	
Chicago Film Critics Association Awards	December 21, 2020	Best Adapted Screenplay	Kemp Powers	Nominated	
Chicago Film Critics Association Awards	December 21, 2020	Most Promising Performer	Kingsley Ben-Adir	Nominated	
Costume Designers Guild Awards	April 13, 2021	Excellence in Period Film	Francine Jamison-Tanchuck	Nominated	
Critics' Choice Movie Awards	March 7, 2021	Best Picture		Nominated	
Critics' Choice Movie Awards	March 7, 2021	Best Director	Regina King	Nominated	
Critics' Choice Movie Awards	March 7, 2021	Best Supporting Actor	Leslie Odom Jr.	Nominated	
Critics' Choice Movie Awards	March 7, 2021	Best Adapted Screenplay	Kemp Powers	Nominated	
Critics' Choice Movie Awards	March 7, 2021	Best Acting Ensemble		Nominated	
Critics' Choice Movie Awards	March 7, 2021	Best Song	Leslie Odom Jr. and Sam Ashworth	Won	
Directors Guild of America Awards	April 10, 2021	Outstanding Directing – First-Time Feature Film	Regina King	Nominated	
Gotham Independent Film Awards	January 11, 2021	Breakthrough Actor	Kingsley Ben-Adir	Won	
Golden Globe Awards	February 28, 2021	Best Supporting Actor – Motion Picture	Leslie Odom Jr.	Nominated	
Golden Globe Awards	February 28, 2021	Best Director	Regina King	Nominated	
Golden Globe Awards	February 28, 2021	Best Original Song	Leslie Odom Jr. and Sam Ashworth	Nominated	
Grammy Awards	April 3, 2022	Best Compilation Soundtrack for Visual Media	Various Artists	Nominated	
Grammy Awards	April 3, 2022	Best Song Written for Visual Media	Leslie Odom Jr. and Sam Ashworth	Nominated	
Hollywood Music in Media Awards	January 27, 2021	Best Original Song in a Feature Film	Leslie Odom Jr. and Sam Ashworth	Nominated	
Houston Film Critics Society Awards	January 18, 2021	Best Picture		Won	
Houston Film Critics Society Awards	January 18, 2021	Best Director	Regina King	Nominated	
Houston Film Critics Society Awards	January 18, 2021	Best Supporting Actor	Leslie Odom Jr.	Won	
Houston Film Critics Society Awards	January 18, 2021	Best Screenplay	Kemp Powers	Nominated	
Houston Film Critics Society Awards	January 18, 2021	Best Original Song	Leslie Odom Jr. and Sam Ashworth	Won	
Independent Spirit Awards	April 22, 2021	Robert Altman Award	Regina King, Kimberly Hardin, Kingsley Ben-Adir, Eli Goree, Aldis Hodge and Leslie Odom Jr.	Won	
NAACP Image Awards	March 27, 2021	Outstanding Motion Picture		Nominated	
NAACP Image Awards	March 27, 2021	Outstanding Supporting Actor in a Motion Picture	Aldis Hodge	Nominated	
NAACP Image Awards	March 27, 2021	Outstanding Directing in a Motion Picture	Regina King	Nominated	
NAACP Image Awards	March 27, 2021	Outstanding Writing in a Motion Picture	Kemp Powers	Nominated	
Online Film Critics Society Awards	January 25, 2021	Best Supporting Actor	Leslie Odom Jr.	Won	
Online Film Critics Society Awards	January 25, 2021	Best Adapted Screenplay	Kemp Powers	Nominated	
Online Film Critics Society Awards	January 25, 2021	Best Directorial Debut	Regina King	Nominated	
Producers Guild of America Awards	March 24, 2021	Best Theatrical Motion Picture	Jess Wu Calder, Keith Calder and Jody Klein	Nominated	
San Diego Film Critics Society Awards	January 11, 2021	Best Picture		Nominated	
San Diego Film Critics Society Awards	January 11, 2021	Best Ensemble		Nominated	
San Francisco Bay Area Film Critics Circle Awards	January 18, 2021	Best Supporting Actor	Leslie Odom Jr.	Nominated	
San Francisco Bay Area Film Critics Circle Awards	January 18, 2021	Best Original Score	Terence Blanchard	Nominated	
San Francisco Bay Area Film Critics Circle Awards	January 18, 2021	Best Production Design	Barry Robison and Mark Zuelzke and Janessa Hitsman	Nominated	
Screen Actors Guild Awards	April 4, 2021	Outstanding Performance by a Cast in a Motion Picture	Kingsley Ben-Adir, Beau Bridges, Lawrence Gilliard Jr., Eli Goree, Aldis Hodge, Michael Imperioli, Joaquina Kalukango, Leslie Odom Jr., Lance Reddick and Nicolette Robinson	Nominated	
Screen Actors Guild Awards	April 4, 2021	Outstanding Performance by a Male Actor in a Supporting Role	Leslie Odom Jr.	Nominated	
Toronto International Film Festival Awards	September 20, 2020	People's Choice Award	One Night in Miami	Runner-up	
Writers Guild of America Awards	March 21, 2021	Best Adapted Screenplay	Kemp Powers	Nominated	
