= Sidney Thompson =

American poet

- Born: Memphis, Tennessee, U.S.
- Education: University of Memphis (BA); University of Arkansas (MFA); University of North Texas (PhD)
- Occupations: Author; academic; writing consultant

Sidney Thompson is an American author, academic, and writing consultant who teaches at Texas Christian University.

== Life ==
Born in Memphis, Tennessee, Thompson received his B.A. in English from the University of Memphis, his M.F.A. in creative writing from the University of Arkansas, and his Ph.D. from the University of North Texas. Writing within the Southern and Southwestern traditions, he draws his themes and characters from history in ways that have been compared to Larry McMurtry and R.E.M.

His major works include Sideshow: Stories, recipient of the 2006 Foreword INDIE Silver Award for Short Story Collection of the Year, and a trilogy of historical novels about the African-American deputy U.S. marshal Bass Reeves. Follow the Angels, Follow the Doves: The Bass Reeves Trilogy, Book One is the recipient of the 2021 International AAHGS Book Award for Historical Fiction: Event/Era, a finalist for the 2021 Spur Award for Historical Novel by Western Writers of America, the 2021 Oklahoma Book Award for Fiction by the Oklahoma Department of Libraries, the Will Rogers Medallion Award for Western Fiction, the 2021 Next Generation Indie Award for Historical Fiction (Pre-1900s), and the Peacemaker Book Award for Best First Western Novel by Western Fictioneers, and was named a 2020 Arkansas Gem by the Arkansas Center for the Book. Follow the Angels includes the chapter "Thataway," which received the Creative Writing Award in 2018 from the Western Literature Association. Hell on the Border: The Bass Reeves Trilogy, Book Two was a finalist for the 2021 National Indie Excellence Award for Historical Fiction. Both of the first two books of the trilogy were used as source material for the Paramount+ limited series, Lawmen: Bass Reeves.

== Bibliography ==
- Sideshow: Stories (River City Publishing, 2006)
- You/Wee: Poems from a Father (Prolific Press, 2018)
- Kudzu's Enormous New Life (Atmosphere Press, 2022)

Bass Reeves trilogy

1. Follow the Angels, Follow the Doves (Bison Books, 2020)
2. Hell on the Border (Bison Books, 2021)
3. The Forsaken and the Dead (Bison Books, 2023)
