= Lawmen: Bass Reeves =

2023 American Western TV series

- Genre: Western drama
- Created by: Chad Feehan
- Based on: Follow the Angels, Follow the Doves and Hell on the Border by Sidney Thompson
- Directed by: Christina Alexandra Voros; Damian Marcano
- Starring: David Oyelowo; Lauren E. Banks; Demi Singleton; Forrest Goodluck; Barry Pepper; Dennis Quaid; Grantham Coleman; Donald Sutherland
- Theme music composer: Chanda Dancy
- Country of origin: United States
- Original language: English
- No. of episodes: 8

Production
- Executive producers: Ron Burkle; Chad Feehan; David C. Glasser; David Hutkin; David Oyelowo; Jessica Oyelowo; David Permut; Taylor Sheridan; Bob Yari
- Running time: 32–57 minutes
- Production companies: Catch Fire; Yoruba Saxon; Bosque Ranch Productions; 101 Studios; MTV Entertainment Studios

Original release
- Network: Paramount+
- Release: November 5 – December 17, 2023

Lawmen: Bass Reeves is an American Western television miniseries created by Chad Feehan, who also serves as showrunner, and executive produced by Taylor Sheridan, Feehan, David C. Glasser, David Oyelowo, Jessica Oyelowo, David Permut, Christina Alexandra Voros, Ron Burkle, Bob Yari, and David Hutkin. It is based on the life of one of the first African American Deputy U.S. Marshals west of the Mississippi River, Bass Reeves as well as on the first two books of Bass Reeves trilogy written by Sidney Thompson. The series premiered on Paramount+ on November 5, 2023, with back-to-back episodes.

== Cast and characters ==
=== Main ===
- David Oyelowo as Bass Reeves: A federal peace officer of the "Indian Territory" based in Fort Smith, Arkansas, who captured over 3,000 of the most dangerous criminals without ever being wounded.
- Lauren E. Banks as Jennie Reeves: Bass' wife
- Demi Singleton as Sally Reeves: Bass' eldest daughter
- Forrest Goodluck as Billy Crow: A young Cherokee man with an affinity for dime store books and gaudy style.
- Barry Pepper as Esau Pierce: The leader of the 1st Cherokee Mounted Rifles
- Dennis Quaid as Sherrill Lynn: A Deputy U.S. Marshal
- Grantham Coleman as Edwin Jones: An extremely persuasive man who has a clear vision and a promise for the future, to those who will listen.
- Donald Sutherland as Isaac C. Parker: An imposing and commanding judge in the Fort Smith Courthouse, known as the "Hanging Judge".

=== Recurring ===
- Joaquina Kalukango as Esme
- Lonnie Chavis as Arthur Mayberry
- Rob Morgan as Ramsey
- Justin Hurtt-Dunkley as Ike Rogers
- Sekou Goodson as Newland Reeves
- Saveah Goodson as Alice Reeves
- Sanaya Goodson as Harriet Reeves
- Heather Kafka as Florence Hammersley

=== Guest ===
- Shea Whigham as Colonel George Reeves
- Jessica Oyelowo as Rachel Reeves
- David Lee Smith as General Van Dorn
- Margot Bingham as Sara Jumper
- Riley Looc as Curtis Jumper
- Crystle Lightning as Nita
- Garrett Hedlund as Garrett Montgomery
- Paula Malcomson as Mabel Underwood
- Chris Coy as Wylie Dolliver
- Dale Dickey as Widow Dolliver
- Ryan O'Nan as Darrell Dolliver
- Blu Hunt as Calista
- Mo Brings Plenty as Minco Dodge
- Anthony Traina as Silas Cobb
- Tosin Morohunfola as Jackson "Jackrabbit" Cole
- Michael Filipowich as Jim Webb
- Brannon Cross as John Bywater
- Maritza Guerrero as Xiomara Cervantes
- Brian Van Holt as Braxton Sawyer
- Tina Lifford as Moody O'Neil
- Ivan Mbakop as Willy Leach

== Episodes ==
No.	Title	Directed by	Written by	Original release date
1	"Part I"	Christina Alexandra Voros	Teleplay by : Chad Feehan	November 5, 2023
2	"Part II"	Christina Alexandra Voros	Jewel Coronel	November 5, 2023
3	"Part III"	Christina Alexandra Voros	Jacob Forman & Ning Zhou	November 12, 2023
4	"Part IV"	Damian Marcano	J. Todd Scott	November 19, 2023
5	"Part V"	Damian Marcano	Terence Anthony	November 26, 2023
6	"Part VI"	Damian Marcano	Jacob Forman	December 3, 2023
7	"Part VII"	Christina Alexandra Voros	Chad Feehan & K.C. Scott	December 10, 2023
8	"Part VIII"	Christina Alexandra Voros	Chad Feehan	December 17, 2023

== Production ==
=== Development ===
It was announced in September 2021 that Taylor Sheridan was developing a television series based on Reeves, with David Oyelowo set to star in the role. In May 2022, the series was ordered at Paramount+ and was temporarily named 1883: The Bass Reeves Story. It was initially described as a spinoff of the series 1883, itself a prequel to Yellowstone, but has since been confirmed to no longer take place in the Yellowstone universe. The show is heavily based on the first two books of The Bass Reeves Trilogy by Sidney Thompson: Follow the Angels, Follow the Doves, and Hell on the Border.

In April 2024, series creator Chad Feehan stated that if the series were renewed it would become an anthology and focus on historical lawmen other than Reeves.

=== Casting ===
Dennis Quaid joined the cast in January 2023. Forrest Goodluck, Lauren E. Banks and Barry Pepper were cast in February, with Grantham Coleman and Demi Singleton added the following month. Garrett Hedlund was also cast. In April, the series was retitled Lawmen: Bass Reeves in order to expand the series to depict other prominent lawmen, with Donald Sutherland (in his final television role), Joaquina Kalukango, Lonnie Chavis, Rob Morgan, Ryan O'Nan, Justin Hurtt-Dunkley and Shea Whigham joining the cast in recurring roles.

=== Filming ===
Filming for the series began in Fort Worth, Texas in October 2022. In January 2023, Quaid stated he had begun filming for the series. Filming wrapped by early June 2023.

== Release ==
Lawmen: Bass Reeves premiered on Paramount+ on November 5, 2023. The first two episodes of the series then aired on CBS on November 12.

== Reception ==
On review aggregator Rotten Tomatoes, the series has an approval rating of 81% based on 26 reviews, with an average rating of 6.4/10. The site's consensus reads: "With David Oyelowo capably stepping into the stirrups of Bass Reeves, this gritty procedural is slow to the draw but hits its mark nonetheless." Metacritic, which uses a weighted average, assigned a score of 65 out of 100, based on 16 critics, indicating "generally favorable reviews".

=== Awards and nominations ===
Award	Date of ceremony	Category	Nominee(s)	Result	Ref.
Black Reel Awards	August 13, 2024	Outstanding Television Movie or Limited Series	Lawmen: Bass Reeves	Won	
Black Reel Awards	August 13, 2024	Outstanding Lead Performance in a TV Movie/Limited Series	David Oyelowo	Won	
Black Reel Awards	August 13, 2024	Outstanding Writing in a TV Movie or Limited Series	Terence Anthony (for "Part V")	Nominated	
Black Reel Awards	August 13, 2024	Outstanding Musical Score	Chanda Dancy	Nominated	
Black Reel Awards	August 13, 2024	Outstanding Editing	Michael Schultz	Nominated	
Black Reel Awards	August 13, 2024	Outstanding Makeup & Hairstyling	Kelley Curry	Nominated	
Black Reel Awards	August 13, 2024	Outstanding Production Design	Wynn Thomas	Won	
Astra TV Awards	August 18, 2024	Best Actor in a Limited Series or TV Movie	David Oyelowo	Nominated	
Primetime Creative Arts Emmy Awards	September 7–8, 2024	Outstanding Music Composition for a Limited or Anthology Series, Movie or Special (Original Dramatic Score)	Chanda Dancy (for "Part I")	Nominated	
