= Chris Henry Coffey =

American actor (b. 1971)

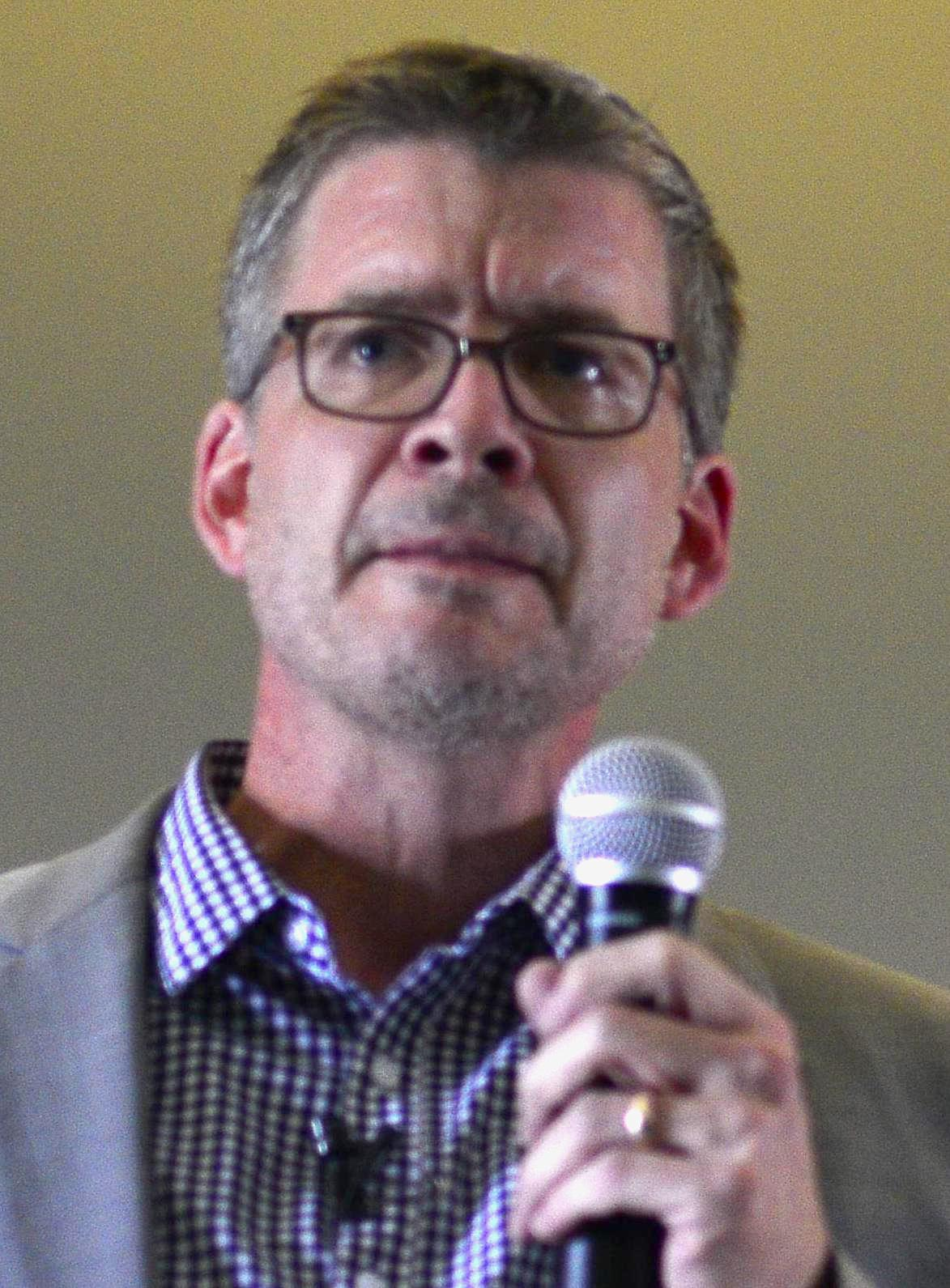
- Coffey in 2017
- Born: May 1, 1971 (age 55); Green Bay, Wisconsin, US
- Occupation: Actor
- Years active: 1990–present
- Spouse: Jennifer Mudge (m. 2014)

Chris Henry Coffey (born May 1, 1971) is an American actor.

== Life and career ==
Coffey was born and raised in Green Bay, Wisconsin. A 1999 graduate of the Yale School of Drama, he has originated roles on Broadway, off-Broadway and regionally in numerous world premieres including Bekah Brunstetter's Public Servant on Theatre Row (New York City), Gina Gionfriddo's Can You Forgive Her? at the Huntington Theater Company, directed by Peter DuBois, Richard Nelson's Frank's Home, directed by Robert Falls (Playwrights Horizons, NYC, Goodman Theater, Chicago, IL), Richard Nelson's How Shakespeare Won the West (Huntington Theater, Boston, MA) and working alongside Arthur Miller in his penultimate play, Resurrection Blues, directed by Mark Lamos (Old Globe Theater, San Diego, CA). Coffey made his Broadway debut in the play Bronx Bombers, as Joe DiMaggio at the Circle in the Square after originating the role Off-Broadway at Primary Stages.

Additional theatrical highlights include Days to Come by Lillian Hellman for the Mint Theater Company, Lips Together, Teeth Apart, directed by Mark Lamos (Westport Playhouse, CT), The Front Page, directed by Gordon Edelstein (Long Wharf Theater, New Haven CT), Violet Hour, directed by David Kennedy, and Hedda Gabler, directed by Ron Daniels (Dallas Theater Center, Dallas, TX), P.R. Man (Ohio Theatre, NYC), A View from the Bridge and A Midsummer Night's Dream (Alley Theater, Houston, TX), Galileo and Measure For Measure (Yale Repertory Theater, New Haven, CT), among many others.

Television appearances include guest starring roles on And Just Like That..., Mrs. Fletcher, Chicago Fire, Instinct, Law & Order: SVU, The Good Wife, Cupid and Law & Order, as well as recurring roles on Law & Order: Criminal Intent and Guiding Light.

His major feature film appearances include Thirteen Days (2000), The International (2009), Trust (2010), Almost Love (2019) and The Good Nurse (2022). His work in Trust was singled out by Roger Ebert in his "Best Films of 2011" list and his performance was praised at the Toronto Film Festival as a "tour-de-force performance... giving a shockingly convincing performance that is equally perverse and plausible".

Coffey has starred in three short films that have made their premieres at the Tribeca Film Festival: BFF (2012), Epilogue (2013), and Master Maggie (2019).

Coffey lives in New York City with his wife, actress Jennifer Mudge.
