= Joy Nash =

American actress (born 1980)

- Born: August 5, 1980 (age 46); Dallas, Texas, U.S.
- Education: University of Southern California
- Occupation: Actress
- Years active: 2007–present

Joy Nash (born August 5, 1980) is an American actress best known for her role as Alicia "Plum" Kettle on the AMC television series Dietland. Before this breakout role, she appeared in Twin Peaks: The Return and The Mindy Project among other television shows. She wrote and directed A Fat Rant, a viral video in 2007.

== Filmography ==
=== Films ===
Year	Title	Role	Notes
2001	American Wet Dream	Partygoer	Short film
2007	Murderess	Winnie Ruth Judd	
2008	Break	Cocktail waitress	Cameo appearance
2010	The Weathered Underground	Psychic	
2011	Chillerama	Cheerleader girl	Uncredited
2013	Bottlenose	Jane	
2015	Friday Night with Crystal	Drunk girl	Short film
2016	The Garden Party	Elmory	Short film
2018	Dead Women Walking	Wendy	
2019	Shape Shifter	Woman on scooter	Short film

=== Television ===
Year	Title	Role	Notes
2011	I Didn't Know I Was Pregnant	Rayna	Episode: "Baby in the Back Seat: Browning/Plunkett"
2012	Banged Up Abroad	Angela Carneige	Episode: "Busted in Bangkok"
2013	The Mindy Project	Simone	Episodes: "Harry&Sally", "Mindy's Birthday"
2015	The Fosters	Stage manager	Episode: "Over/Under"
2017	Casual	Woman at pool	Episode: "Things to Do in Burbank When You're Dead"
2017	Twin Peaks: The Return	Señorita Dido	Episode: "Part 8"
2018	Dietland	Alicia "Plum" Kettle	Lead role; 10 episodes
2020	The Resident	Bianca	Episode: "Best Laid Plans"
