= Dutchman (film) =

1966 film by Anthony Harvey

- Theatrical release poster
- Directed by: Anthony Harvey
- Produced by: Gene Persson
- Starring: Shirley Knight; Al Freeman Jr; Howard Bennett
- Cinematography: Gerry Turpin
- Edited by: Anthony Harvey
- Release date: 1966
- Running time: 55 minutes
- Country: United Kingdom
- Language: English

Dutchman is a 1966 British drama film, produced at Twickenham Film Studios, directed by Anthony Harvey and starring Shirley Knight and Al Freeman, Jr. It was based on the 1964 play Dutchman by Amiri Baraka (a.k.a. Le Roi Jones), who wrote the screenplay adaptation. John Barry wrote the score. The movie tells the story of a black man who meets a white woman while riding the subway in New York City.

Although not shown widely, the film was critically well-received and was nominated for the Golden Lion at the Venice Film Festival, where Shirley Knight received the Volpi Cup for best actress.

== Cast ==
- Shirley Knight as Lula
- Al Freeman Jr as Clay
- Howard Bennett as subway rider
- Robert Calvert as subway rider
- Frank Lieberman as subway rider
- Sandy Mcdonald as subway rider
- Dennis Peters as subway rider
- Keith James as subway rider
- Devon Hall as subway rider

== Reception ==
The Monthly Film Bulletin wrote: "Though remaining extremely faithful to Jones' original text, director Anthony Harvey has enriched the mythical dimension of the charged encounter between predatory, white female and retiring, black male by having his train stop more than once at the same station. The implication of an inescapable and infinitely recurring ritual – implicit in the play's circular structure – is thus strengthened by the surrealistic nature of Lula's unending journey on a train "going some other way than mine". And the deliberately austere camerawork suggests more compellingly than any theatrical performance could do the claustrophobic menace of the subway setting and the couple's obliviousness to their fellow passengers. Much of Dutchman's power lies of course in the initial ambiguity of the encounter between the two protagonists. ... But though Clay appears as a ritual victim, a classical scapegoat, Lula herself has too sharp an awareness of her own eventual destruction not to appear as the drama's ultimate victim. And it is this which raises Dutchman above the simple incitement to hatred which many critics have seen in it, to the level of the best dramatic tragedy. Shirley Knight is superb as the slatternly, almost schizophrenic, heroine, and Al Freeman, Jnr displays a fine control in the part of Clay."

Bosley Crowther wrote a critical review of the film in The New York Times.
