= Dietland (TV series) =

2018 American television series

- Genre: Dark comedy
- Created by: Marti Noxon
- Based on: Dietland by Sarai Walker
- Starring: Joy Nash; Tamara Tunie; Robin Weigert; Rowena King; Adam Rothenberg; Erin Darke; Ricardo Davila; Tramell Tillman; Will Seefried; Julianna Margulies
- Composer: Fil Eisler
- Country of origin: United States
- Original language: English
- No. of seasons: 1
- No. of episodes: 10

Production
- Executive producers: Marti Noxon; David Ellison; Dana Goldberg; Marcy Ross; Maria Grasso; Bonnie Curtis; Julie Lynn; Jacqueline Hoyt
- Production companies: Uncharted; AMC Studios; Mockingbird Pictures; Tiny Pyro

Original release
- Network: AMC
- Release: June 4 – July 30, 2018

Dietland is an American dark comedy drama television series created by Marti Noxon, based on the 2015 novel of the same name by Sarai Walker. The straight-to-series 10-episode first season premiered on AMC with back to back episodes on June 4, 2018.

On September 20, 2018, AMC announced that the series had been cancelled. The series had persistently low ratings. The show averaged 203,000 viewers among the advertiser-coveted adults 18–48 demographics — with three days of DVR.

== Premise ==
Alicia "Plum" Kettle (Joy Nash), a ghostwriter at a New York fashion magazine, struggles with self-image and is treated poorly by her boss, Kitty Montgomery (Julianna Margulies). While awaiting an appointment for weight loss surgery, Plum is recruited by a radical feminist cabal. Meanwhile, men who have been accused of sexual abuse and assault are mysteriously turning up dead.

== Cast and characters ==
=== Main ===
- Joy Nash as Alicia "Plum" Kettle
- Tamara Tunie as Julia Smith
- Robin Weigert as Verena Baptist
- Rowena King as Cheryl Crane-Murphy
- Adam Rothenberg as Dominic O'Shea
- Erin Darke as Leeta Albridge
- Ricardo Davila as Eladio
- Tramell Tillman as Steven
- Will Seefried as Ben
- Julianna Margulies as Kitty Montgomery

=== Recurring ===
- Melissa Navia as Moana
- Debra Monk as Mrs Kettle
- Dariush Kashani as Clive
- Alanna Ubach as Marlowe Buchanan
- Ami Sheth as Sana
- Campbell Scott as Stanley Austen
- Jen Ponton as Rubi
- Kelly Hu as Abra Austen
- Marc Blucas as Bobby
- Mark Tallman as Jake
- Mya Taylor as Barbara
- Colby Minifie as Jasmine
- Laura Darrell as Anna
- Karen Eilbacher as Jillian

== Episodes ==
No.	Title	Directed by	Teleplay by	Original release date	U.S. viewers (millions)
1	"Pilot"	Marti Noxon	Marti Noxon	June 4, 2018	0.668
2	"Tender Belly"	Marti Noxon	Marti Noxon	June 4, 2018	0.668
3	"Y Not"	Michael Trim	Jacqueline Hoyt	June 11, 2018	0.490
4	"F... This"	Michael Trim	Nancy Fichman & Jennifer Hoppe-House	June 18, 2018	0.449
5	"Plum Tuckered"	Amy York Rubin	Matt Shire	June 25, 2018	0.409
6	"Belly of the Beast"	Amy York Rubin	Janine Nabers	July 2, 2018	0.403
7	"Monster High"	Helen Shaver	Marshall Heyman	July 9, 2018	0.342
8	"Rad Fatties"	Helen Shaver	Nancy Fichman & Jennifer Hoppe-House	July 16, 2018	0.314
9	"Woman Down"	Liesl Tommy	Jacqueline Hoyt & Marti Noxon	July 23, 2018	0.285
10	"Bedwomb"	Marti Noxon	Marti Noxon	July 30, 2018	0.300

== Reception ==
=== Critical response ===
On the review aggregator website Rotten Tomatoes, the series has an approval rating of 83% based on 52 reviews, with an average rating of 6.8/10. The website's critical consensus reads, "The well-acted Dietland delivers timely and engaging social commentary with enough humor and scathing wit to make up for an occasionally scattered narrative approach." Metacritic, which uses a weighted average, assigned a score of 66 out of 100 based on 22 critics, indicating "generally favorable reviews".

=== Ratings ===
Viewership and ratings per episode of Dietland
No.	Title	Air date	Rating (18–49)	Viewers (millions)	DVR viewers (millions)	Total viewers (millions)
1	"Pilot"	June 4, 2018	0.16	0.668	0.253	0.921
2	"Tender Belly"	June 4, 2018	0.16	0.668	0.253	0.921
3	"Y Not"	June 11, 2018	0.11	0.490	0.274	0.764
4	"F... This"	June 18, 2018	0.11	0.449	0.314	0.763
5	"Plum Tuckered"	June 25, 2018	0.10	0.409	0.246	0.655
6	"Belly of the Beast"	July 2, 2018	0.09	0.403	0.300	0.703
7	"Monster High"	July 9, 2018	0.09	0.342	0.263	0.605
8	"Rad Fatties"	July 16, 2018	0.08	0.314	0.284	0.598
9	"Woman Down"	July 23, 2018	0.06	0.285	0.217	0.503
10	"Bedwomb"	July 30, 2018	0.08	0.300	0.237	0.537

== Talk show ==
A late-night companion talk show was released after the episodes from Embassy Row, AMC Studios and Uncharted. It was created and hosted by Aisha Tyler from June 6 to June 30, 2018.
