= Kimberly Hardin =

American casting director and film producer (1961–Present)

- Occupations: Casting director, film producer
- Known for: One Night In Miami, Hustle & Flow, Think Like a Man

Kimberly Hardin is an African-American casting director and film producer. She is known for her casting of films, such as Hustle & Flow, Cadillac Records, Bloodline, Think Like a Man, and One Night in Miami.... She has also worked with several directors and producers, including John Singleton, Regina King, Kerry Washington, Tim Story, F. Gary Gray, Craig Brewer, Lena Waithe, Bruna Papandrea, and Graham King.

== Career ==
Kimberly started her career with an internship in the office of Jane Jenkins and Janet Hirshenson. She got a job with Jaki Brown, who was casting a Sprite commercial. In 2017, she was invited to become a member of the Academy of Motion Pictures. Soon, she was interviewed for the first Academy Museum of Motion Pictures. In 2021, she was awarded the Independent Spirit Robert Altman Award and the Casting Society of America award for her work on One Night in Miami.

== Credits ==
=== Casting director ===
- Little Monsters (2019)
- If Not Now, When? (2019)
- Blindspotting (2018)
- Traffik (2018)
- Love Jacked (2018)
- Rebel (2017)
- Snowfall (2017)
- Michael Jackson: Searching for Neverland (2017)
- Think Like a Man (2012)
- Madea Goes to Jail (2009)
- Not Easily Broken (2009)
- Cadillac Records (2008)
- First Sunday (2008)
- This Christmas (2007)
- Hustle & Flow (2005)
- Four Brothers (2005)
- Black Snake Moan (2006)
- Biker Boyz (2003)
- 2 Fast 2 Furious (2003)

=== Producer ===
- Uncensored (2019 – 2020)
- The Perfect Match (2016)
- Bachelors (2015)
- Brotherly Love (2015)

== Accolades ==
Year	Award	Movie	Category	Result
2020	AARP	One Night in Miami	Best Ensemble	Won
2020	Austin Film Critics	One Night in Miami	Best Ensemble	Won
2020	Black Film Critics	One Night in Miami	Best Ensemble	Nominated
2020	Black Reels	One Night in Miami	outstanding Ensemble	Won
2020	Broadcast Film Critics	One Night in Miami	Best Ensemble	Nominated
2020	Chicago Independent Critics	One Night in Miami	Best Ensemble	Nominated
2020	Detroit Film Critics	One Night in Miami	Best Ensemble	Nominated
2020	Discussing Film Critics	One Night in Miami	Best Ensemble	Nominated
2020	EDA	One Night in Miami	Best Ensemble	Won
2020	Phoenix Online Association	One Night in Miami	Best Cast	Won
2020	Southeast Film Critics Association	One Night in Miami	Best Ensemble	Nominated
2020	Indiana Critics	One Night in Miami	Best cast	2nd Place winner
2020	San Francisco Critics	One Night in Miami	Best cast	Won
2019	Screen Guild	Little Monster	Best cast	Nominated
2013	Black Reel Awards	Think Like a Man	Best Ensemble	Nominated
2008	Black Reels	Cadillac Records	Best Ensemble	Won
