= The One and Only Dick Gregory =

- Promotional release poster
- Directed by: Andre Gaines
- Written by: Andre Gaines
- Produced by: Andre Gaines; Valerie Edwards
- Cinematography: Derek Mindler; Lucas Pitassi
- Edited by: Cinque Northern; Ron Eigen; Patrick Murphy
- Music by: Kyle Townsend
- Production companies: Showtime Documentary Films; Cinemation Studios; Hillman Grad Productions; Hartbeat Productions
- Distributed by: Showtime
- Release dates: June 19, 2021 (Tribeca); July 4, 2021 (United States)
- Running time: 113 minutes
- Country: United States
- Language: English

The One and Only Dick Gregory is a 2021 American documentary film, directed, written, and produced by Andre Gaines, under his Cinemation Studios banner. It follows the life and career of comedian and activist Dick Gregory. Kevin Hart and Lena Waithe serve as executive producers under their Hartbeat Productions and Hillman Grad Productions, banners, respectively.

It had its world premiere at the Tribeca Film Festival on June 19, 2021. It was released on July 4, 2021, by Showtime.

== Synopsis ==
The film follows the life and career of comedian and activist, Dick Gregory. Gregory, Kevin Hart, Chris Rock, Lena Waithe, Dave Chappelle, Wanda Sykes, W. Kamau Bell, Harry Belafonte, Lilian Gregory, Steve Jaffe and Christian Gregory appear in the film.

== Release ==
The film had its world premiere at the Tribeca Film Festival on June 19, 2021. It also screened at AFI Docs on June 24, 2021. It was released on July 4, 2021, by Showtime.

== Critical reception ==
The One and Only Dick Gregory received positive reviews from film critics. It holds a 100% approval rating on review aggregator website Rotten Tomatoes, based on 19 reviews, with a weighted average of 8.3/10. The website's consensus reads, "The One and Only Dick Gregory gives its singular subject his due with a comprehensive retrospective and thoughtful commentary, highlighting how the comedy icon's contributions extended far beyond the stage." On Metacritic, the film holds a rating of 79 out of 100, based on eight critics, indicating "generally favorable" reviews.
