= Dietland =

2015 novel by Sarai Walker

- The front cover of the first edition (hardcover)
- Author: Sarai Walker
- Cover artist: Laserghost
- Language: English
- Publisher: Houghton Mifflin Harcourt
- Publication date: May 26, 2015
- Publication place: United States
- Media type: Print (hardback and paperback), e-book, audiobook
- Pages: 320
- ISBN: 9780544373433
- OCLC: 885225468

Dietland is the debut novel by Sarai Walker that was first published on May 26, 2015 by Houghton Mifflin Harcourt. The novel explores the beauty industry and society's obsession with weight loss. A television adaptation of the novel by Marti Noxon premiered on June 4, 2018, on AMC; Joy Nash plays the role of the lead character, Plum.

== Synopsis ==
The novel follows Plum Kettle, a 300-pound ghostwriter hired to respond to the hundreds of emails written to the editor of popular teen magazine Daisy Chain. Plum fantasizes about being thin and after years of failed diet plans, she schedules an appointment for weight loss surgery. While awaiting her surgery date, Plum finds herself recruited by an underground feminist cabal known as "Calliope House". Meanwhile, a guerrilla group known as "Jennifer" begins carrying out increasingly violent acts of vigilante justice against those who mistreat women, and Plum soon finds herself at the center of a sinister plot.

== Development ==
Sarai Walker was inspired to write Dietland after watching the 1999 film Fight Club. "I came out thinking that I had to write the female version," Walker said in an interview with Yahoo! Beauty, explaining that it was the film's "social construction of masculinity, of gender, which makes it fascinating from a feminist perspective." Walker's experience working for teen and women's magazines also inspired much of the novel, with the protagonist of Dietland also being a teen magazine writer.

== Themes ==
Critics have called Dietland a "subversive" and "feminist" novel, dealing with themes of body shaming, misogyny and hypersexualization. A central theme of the book is fat- and self-acceptance, with The Guardian's Arwa Mahdawi noting that: "Plum's self-hatred transforms into self-acceptance. She goes from rejecting her fatness to embracing it." NPR's Annalisa Quinn noted however that: "the novel doesn't rest with a predictable message of sugary self-acceptance: Dietland swerves suddenly and powerfully from chick lit to revenge fantasy."

== Reception ==
Dietland was selected as one of Entertainment Weekly's 10 Best Books of 2015. The magazine gave the novel an "A" grade, calling it "a thrilling, incendiary manifesto disguised as a beach read." Kirkus Reviews described Dietland as "hilarious, surreal, and bracingly original," concluding: "Part Fight Club, part feminist manifesto, an offbeat and genre-bending novel that aims high—and delivers."

The Guardian's Lydia Kiesling was not impressed by the book's "structural oddities" but noted that "its message resonates", saying: "It's vanishingly rare...to see a novel that looks like the much-maligned "chick lit" – and sometimes reads like it – so gleefully censorious of rape culture."
