= Aldis Hodge =

American actor (born 1986)

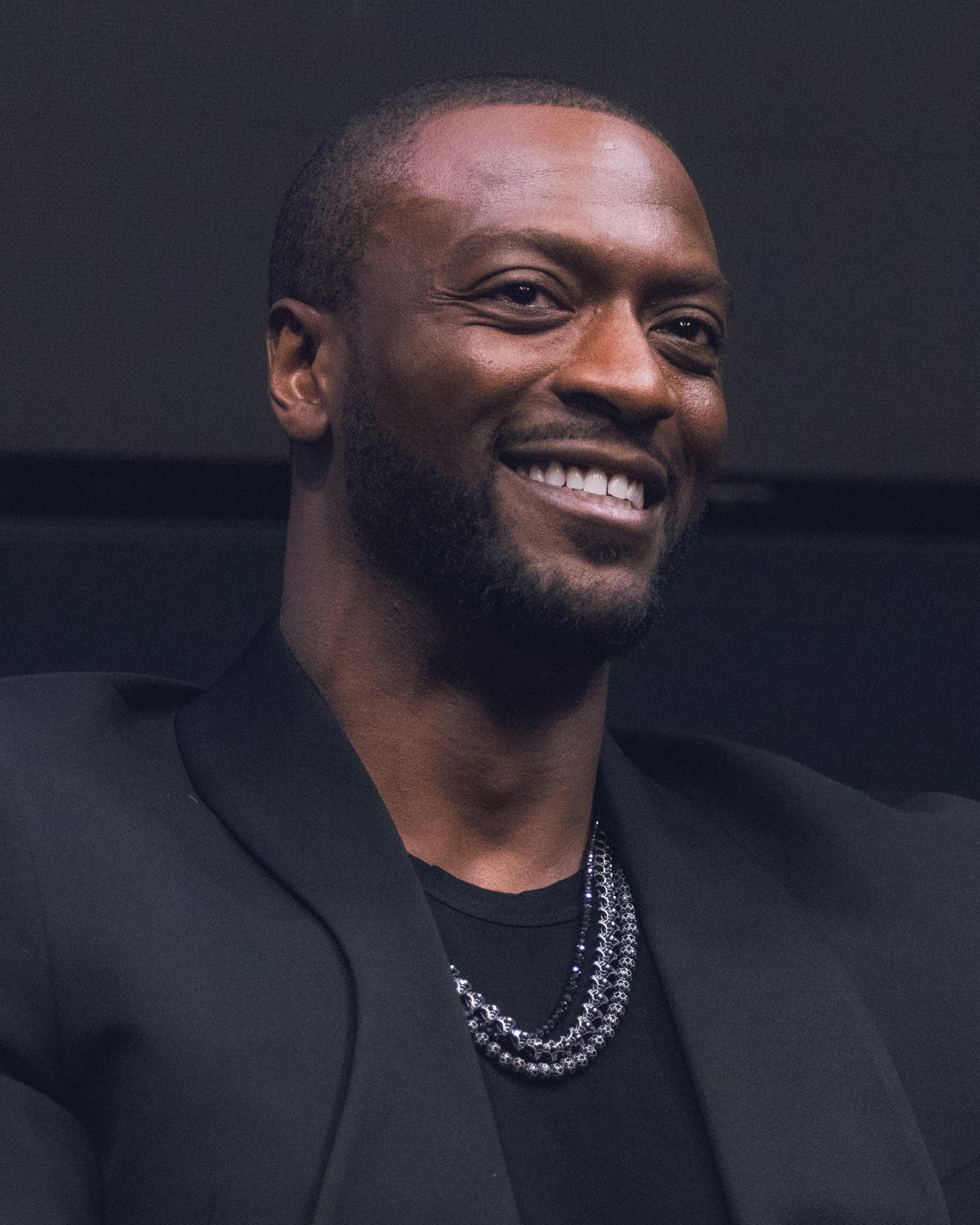
- Hodge in 2026
- Born: Aldis Alexander Basil Hodge; September 20, 1986 (age 40); Jacksonville, North Carolina, U.S.
- Education: ArtCenter College of Design
- Occupation: Actor
- Years active: 1993–present
- Known for: Alex Cross in Cross; Alec Hardison in Leverage; Noah in Underground
- Children: 1
- Relatives: Edwin Hodge (brother)

Aldis Alexander Basil Hodge (born September 20, 1986) is an American actor. He is known for his roles as Alec Hardison in the TNT series Leverage, MC Ren in the 2015 biopic Straight Outta Compton, Levi Jackson in the 2016 film Hidden Figures, Noah in the WGN America series Underground, Matthew in Girlfriends, Jim Brown in the 2020 film One Night in Miami..., and Alex Cross in the Prime Video series Cross. He portrays Hawkman in the DC Studios film Black Adam and John Stewart / Green Lantern in the animated film Green Lantern: Beware My Power.

== Early life and education ==
Aldis Alexander Basil Hodge was born in 1986 or 1987 in Onslow County, North Carolina. Both of his parents, Aldis Basil Hodge and Yolette Evangeline Richardson, served in the U.S. Marine Corps. His mother is from Florida, while his father is originally from Saint Thomas.

His older brother is actor Edwin Hodge. Hodge played both the clarinet and the violin as a child.

Hodge attended ArtCenter College of Design in Pasadena, California.

== Career ==
In 2007, Hodge was cast as Alec Hardison in the TNT series Leverage. In 2009, he received a Saturn Award nomination for Best Supporting Actor on Television for this role. In 2014, it was announced that he was cast in Randall Miller's Midnight Rider, a biopic of Gregg Allman.

In 2019, he began his role as Decourcy Ward in Showtime's City on a Hill with Kevin Bacon. In 2020, it was confirmed that Hodge would play Carter Hall / Hawkman in the Jaume Collet-Serra's DCEU 2022 film Black Adam alongside Dwayne Johnson, Noah Centineo, Sarah Shahi, and Pierce Brosnan.

Hodge plays the lead role of Alex Cross in the Amazon Prime Video streaming series Cross based on the James Patterson series of novels, which premiered on November 14, 2024. The second series was released in 2026, the last episode airing on March 18, with Amazon announcing on the same day that it had been renewed for a third season.

== Other activities ==
In addition to acting, Hodge designs watches, writes, and paints. In 2018, he collaborated with painter Harmonia Rosales on a series of paintings collectively titled "Through the Looking Glass", exhibited in Los Angeles from January 10 to 14. Hodge is a self-taught horologist and watchmaker, and has designed his own brand of luxury watches, A. Hodge Atelier. He has spoken about the need for more diversity in the watchmaking industry.

== Personal life ==
Hodge has a daughter with ex girlfriend Harmonia Rosales whom he dated in 2018.

== Filmography ==
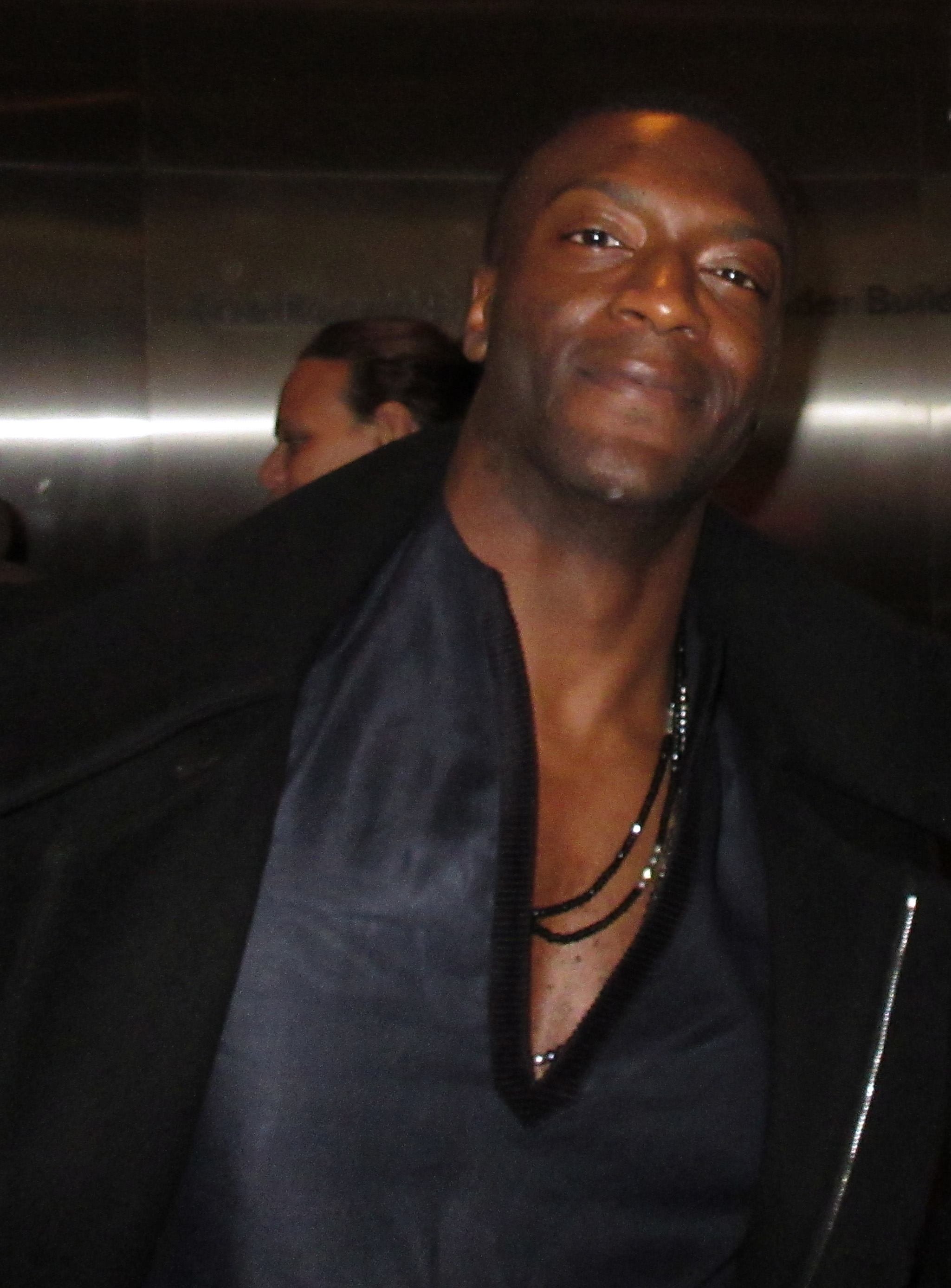
Hodge in New York City in 2019

=== Films ===
Key
†	Denotes films that have not yet been released

Year	Title	Role	Notes
1995	Die Hard with a Vengeance	Raymond	
1996	Bed of Roses	Prince	
2000	Big Momma's House	Basketball Teen #2	
2004	The Ladykillers	Donut Gangster	
2005	The Tenants	Sam Clemence	
2005	Little Athens	Pitt	
2005	Edmond	Leafletter	
2006	Happy Feet	Other voices	Voice role
2006	American Dreamz	Soldier Chuck	
2007	Equal Opportunity	Leroy Williams Jones III / "The Bling Killa"	
2009	Red Sands	Trevor	
2012	The East	Ex-Military Anarchist	
2013	A Good Day to Die Hard	Lieutenant Foxy	
2015	Straight Outta Compton	MC Ren	
2016	Jack Reacher: Never Go Back	Captain Anthony Espin	
2016	Hidden Figures	Levi Jackson	
2018	Brian Banks	Brian Banks	
2019	Clemency	Anthony Woods	
2019	What Men Want	Will	
2020	The Invisible Man	James Lanier	
2020	Magic Camp	Devin Moses	
2020	One Night in Miami...	Jim Brown	
2021	The Birthday Cake	Eagle	
2022	Green Lantern: Beware My Power	John Stewart / Green Lantern	Voice role, direct-to-video
2022	Black Adam	Carter Hall / Hawkman	
2024	Justice League: Crisis on Infinite Earths	John Stewart / Green Lantern, Power Ring	Voice, direct-to-video
2024	Marmalade	Otis	
2024	Parallel	Alex	Also writer and producer
2025	The Dutchman	Warren	
TBA	Road House 2 †	TBA	Post-production

=== Television ===
Year	Title	Role	Notes
1993–1995	Sesame Street	Himself	Recurring role
1997	Between Brothers	Reggie	Episode: "Family Affair"
1998	NYPD Blue	Eddy	Episode: "Weaver of Hate"
1998	Beyond Belief: Fact or Fiction	Camper #1	Episode: "The Wall/The Chalkboard/The Getaway/The Prescription/Summer Camp"
1999	Buffy the Vampire Slayer	Masked Teen	Episode: "Fear, Itself"
1999–2000	Pacific Blue	Maurice Raymond	2 episodes
2000	Judging Amy	Lester Clancy	Episode: "Zero Tolerance"
2000	City of Angels	Marcus Hall	2 episodes
2001–2008	CSI: Crime Scene Investigation	Tony Thorpe	2 episodes
2001	Becker	Graduate #1	Episode: "2001½: A Graduation Odyssey"
2002	Boston Public	Andre	Episode: "Chapter Thirty-Seven"
2002	Charmed	Trey	Episode: "Long Live the Queen"
2003	ER	Young Man	Episode: "The Lost"
2003	Cold Case	Young Mason Tucker	Episode: "The Runner"
2003	American Dreams	Travis Grant	2 episodes
2005–2006	A.T.O.M.	King / Wrecka	Main cast, voice role
2006	Half & Half	Kadeem	Episode: "The Big Training" Episode
2006	Numb3rs	Travis Grant	Episode: "The OG"
2006	Girlfriends	Matthew Miles / Derwin Davis	4 episodes
2006	Bones	Jimmy Merton	Episode: "The Soldier on the Grave"
2006–2007	Friday Night Lights	Ray "Voodoo" Tatum	6 episodes
2007	Supernatural	Jake Talley	Episodes: "All Hell Breaks Loose (Parts 1&2)"
2007	Standoff	Nathan Hall	Episode: "The Kids in the Hall"
2008–2012	Leverage	Alec Hardison	Main cast
2009	Castle	Azi	Episode: "Always Buy Retail"
2009	The Forgotten	Danny Rowe	Episode: "Prisoner Jane"
2010	Mad	Usher / Sinestro / Frog	Voice role, episode: "Extreme Renovation: House Edition - Superman's Fortress of Solitude"
2010	Private Practice	Esau Ajawke	Episode: "Fear of Flying"
2010	The Chicago Code	Deon Luckett	Episode: "St. Valentines Day Massacre"
2011	CSI: Miami	Isaiah Stiles	Episode: "Sinner Takes All"
2014	Rectify	Stefon Whitman	Episode: "Donald the Normal"
2014	The Walking Dead	Mike	Episode: "After"
2014	The After	D. Love	Television film
2014–2017	Turn: Washington's Spies	Jordan / Akinbode	Recurring role
2016–2017	Underground	Noah	Main cast
2017	The Blacklist	Mario Dixon	Episode: "Mr. Kaplan"
2017	Black Mirror	Jack	Episode: "Black Museum"
2018	Star Trek: Short Treks	Craft	Episode: "Calypso"
2019	Medal of Honor	Edward Carter	Episode: "Edward Carter"
2019–2022	City on a Hill	Decourcy Ward	Main cast
2021–2025	Leverage: Redemption	Alec Hardison	Recurring role
2022	The Proud Family: Louder and Prouder	Frankie, Coach	Voice role, 2 episodes
2024–present	Cross	Alex Cross	Title role, producer

=== Video games ===
Year	Project	Role
2004	Grand Theft Auto: San Andreas	Pedestrian
2018	NBA 2K19	Corey Harris

=== Other work ===
Year	Project	Type	Role
2010	Taco Bell	Commercial	The manager
2010	Death, Inc.	Short Film	Leon
2010	Christian Kane	Music video	Security guard
2011	State Farm	Commercial	LeBron James' friend
2011	A Standard Story	Short film	Serious #1
2013	That Guy	Web series	Party attendee
2017	Legacy	Music video	Prison inmate

== Awards and nominations ==
Year	Award	Category	Nominated work	Status	Ref.
2009	Saturn Awards	Best Supporting Actor Television	Leverage	Nominated	
2014	Black Film Critics Circle Awards	Best Ensemble (shared with Neil Brown Jr., Paul Giamatti, Corey Hawkins, O'Shea Jackson Jr. and Jason Mitchell)	Straight Outta Compton	Won	
2016	Screen Actors Guild Awards	Outstanding Performance by a Cast in a Motion Picture	Straight Outta Compton	Nominated	
2017	Screen Actors Guild Awards	Outstanding Performance by a Cast in a Motion Picture	Hidden Figures	Won	
2017	Black Reel TV Awards	Outstanding Actor in a Drama Series	Underground	Nominated	
2019	Gotham Independent Film Award	Best Actor	Clemency	Nominated	
2019	Seattle International Film Festival	Best Actor	Clemency	Runner-up	
2020	London Critics Circle Film Awards	Supporting Actor of the Year	Clemency	Nominated	
2020	Santa Barbara International Film Festival	Virtuoso Award	Clemency	Won	
2020	Black Reel TV Awards	Outstanding Supporting Actor in a Motion Picture	Clemency	Nominated	
2020	Black Reel TV Awards	Outstanding Breakthrough Performance - Male	Clemency	Nominated	
2021	Black Reel TV Awards	Outstanding Supporting Actor in a Motion Picture	One Night in Miami	Nominated	
2021	Screen Actors Guild Awards	Outstanding Performance by a Cast in a Motion Picture	One Night in Miami	Nominated	
2021	NAACP Image Awards	Outstanding Supporting Actor in a Motion Picture	One Night in Miami	Nominated	
2021	Film Independent Spirit Awards	Robert Altman Award (shared with director Regina King, casting director Kimberly Hardin, and ensemble cast Kingsley Ben-Adir, Eli Goree and Leslie Odom Jr.)	One Night in Miami	Won	
2021	Miami International Film Festival	Art of Light Award	One Night in Miami	Won	
2021	Screen Actors Guild Awards	Outstanding Performance by a Cast in a Motion Picture	One Night in Miami	Nominated	
2022	Satellite Awards	Best Actor – Television Series Drama	City on a Hill	Nominated	
2022	NAMIC Vision Awards	Best Performance - Drama	City on a Hill	Nominated	
2023	North Carolina Film Critics Association	Ken Hanke Memorial Tar Heel Award	Black Adam	Nominated	
2023	NAACP Image Awards	Outstanding Supporting Actor in a Motion Picture	Black Adam	Nominated	
