= No Lye: An American Beauty Story =

2019 documentary film by Bayer Mack

- Directed by: Bayer Mack
- Written by: Bayer Mack
- Produced by: Bayer Mack; Frances Presley-Rice
- Narrated by: Alexandria
- Edited by: Bayer Mack
- Music by: Various
- Distributed by: Block Starz Music Television
- Release date: December 5, 2019
- Running time: 55 minutes
- Country: United States
- Language: English

No Lye: An American Beauty Story is a 2019 documentary film by Bayer Mack that chronicles the rise and decline of the black-owned ethnic beauty industry in America.

== Synopsis ==
The ethnic beauty industry begins with the African-American desire for hair straighteners and skin lighteners in the Reconstruction era after slavery. By the 1960s, the sale of black health and beauty aids had blossomed into a multi-million dollar business that was heavily influenced by the civil rights movement. A decade later, innovative hair styles and cosmetic products transformed the market into a billion dollar industry. African-American beauty manufacturers soon began facing hostile competition from large non-black corporations. This documentary details their fight to control the industry and looks at the impact of popular culture on ethnic beauty standards in America. The film also profiles several ethnic beauty industry pioneers, including Annie Malone, Madam C. J. Walker, Samuel B. Fuller, John H. Johnson, George E. Johnson Sr., Comer Cottrell, Soft Sheen Products, Luster Products, Bronner Bros., Willie Morrow, Black Entertainment Television and Essence magazine.

== Release ==
No Lye: An American Beauty Story had its official world premiere at the "Visions of the Black Experience" event hosted by the Sarasota Film Festival and Boxser Diversity Initiative at New College of Florida on 5 December 2019.

== Reception ==
No Lye: An American Beauty Story has been praised for its research and accuracy. Marilyn Smith of the Electronic Urban Report said the film was "full of detail" and that "although it is a documentary, it was actually entertaining". No Lye has been called "probably the best film on the history of black hair care" and was declared a "must see" by the San Francisco Bay View. The Journal of American History said the film "could be used by those who teach popular culture, black business practices, cultural appropriation and expropriation, and the history of the black image". During a virtual panel that included Dudley Beauty Corporation president Ursula Dudley Oglesby, filmmaker Bayer Mack said the ethnic beauty industry, like many other black businesses, owed much of its success to a "segregated economy". The film has received multiple awards and nominations, including the 2020 Black Reel Award for "Outstanding Independent Documentary".

== See also ==
- My Nappy Roots: A Journey Through Black Hair-itage (2006 documentary)
- Good Hair (2009 documentary)
