= Jerry Lawson (engineer) =

American electronic engineer (1940–2011)

- Lawson, 1982
- Born: Gerald Anderson Lawson; December 1, 1940; Brooklyn, New York, U.S
- Died: April 9, 2011 (aged 70); Santa Clara, California, U.S.
- Education: Queens College
- Occupation: Electronic engineer
- Spouse: Catherine (m. 1965)
- Children: 2

Gerald Anderson Lawson (December 1, 1940 – April 9, 2011) was an American electronic engineer. Besides being one of the first African-American computer engineers in Silicon Valley, Lawson was also known for his work in designing the Fairchild Channel F video game console, leading the team that refined ROM cartridges for durable use as commercial video game cartridges. His innovations in this area led to him being considered the father of the game cartridge. He eventually left Fairchild and founded the game company Video-Soft.

== Early life ==
Lawson was born in Brooklyn, New York City, on December 1, 1940. His father, Blanton, was a longshoreman with an interest in science, while his mother, Mannings, worked for the city, and also served on the Parent-Teachers Association for the local school. His grandfather had studied to become a physicist but was unable to pursue a career in physics and worked instead as a postmaster. His parents ensured he received a good education and encouraged his interests in scientific hobbies, including ham radio and chemistry. In addition, Lawson said that his first-grade teacher encouraged him on his path to be someone influential, similar to George Washington Carver. He lived in Queens as a teenager. He earned money by repairing television sets. At the age of 13, he gained an amateur radio license and built his own station at home with parts he bought from local electronic stores. He attended both Queens College and City College of New York, but did not complete a degree at either.

== Career ==
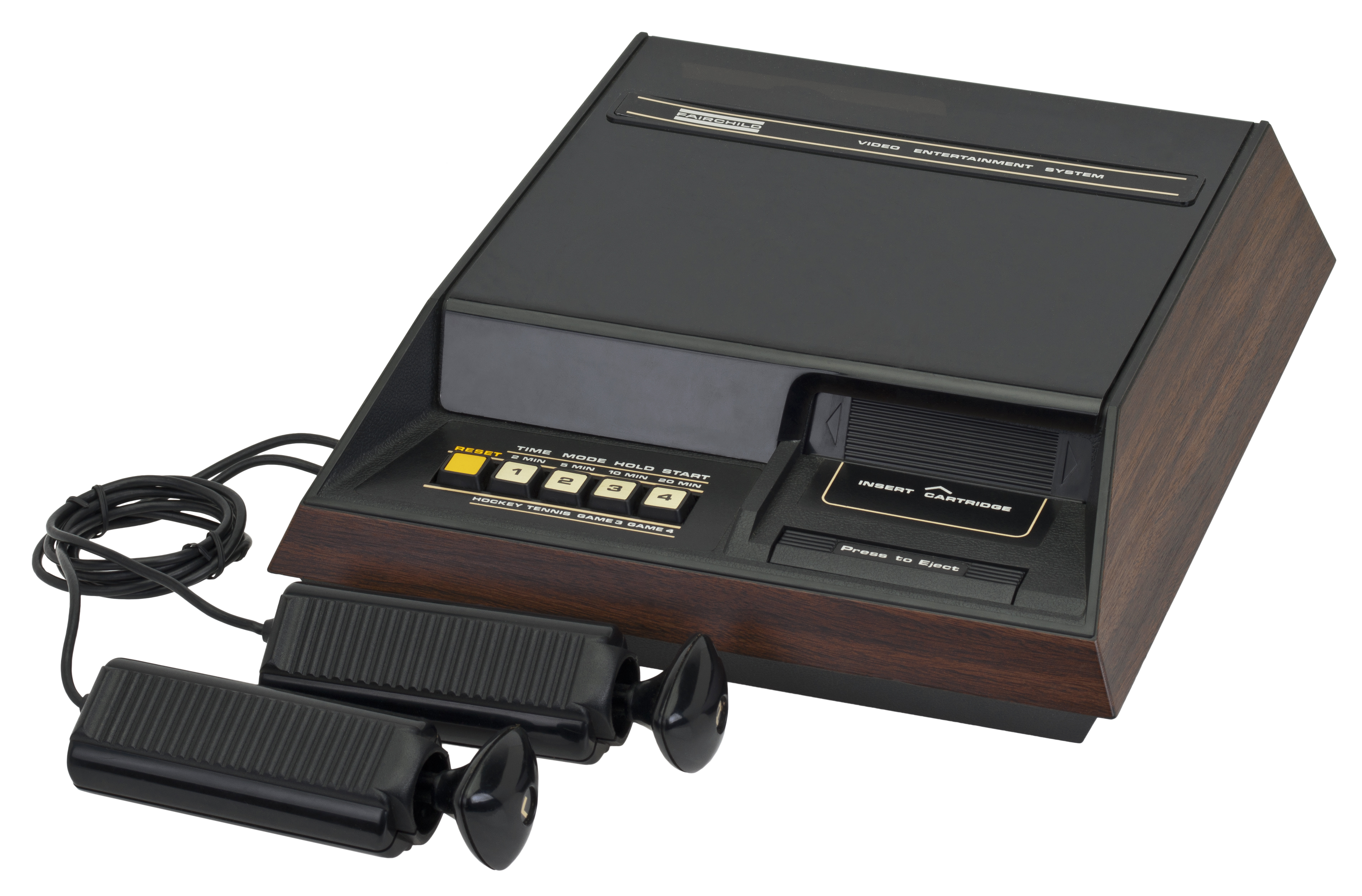
The Fairchild Channel F, with the cartridge slot on the right of the unit

In 1970, he joined Fairchild Semiconductor in San Francisco as an applications engineering consultant within their sales division. While there, he created a coin-operated video game called Demolition Derby in his garage, which was never released. Completed in early 1975 using Fairchild's new F8 microprocessors, Demolition Derby was among the earliest microprocessor-driven games.

In the mid-1970s, Lawson was made Chief Hardware Engineer and Director of Engineering and Marketing for Fairchild's video game division. There, he led the development of the Fairchild Channel F console, released in 1976 and specifically designed to use swappable game cartridges based on technology licensed from Alpex. At the time, most game systems had the game programming built into the hardware so it could not be removed or changed. Lawson and his team refined and improved technology developed at Alpex that allowed games to be stored as software on removable ROM cartridges. These could be inserted and removed repeatedly from a console unit without any danger of electric shocks. This would allow users to buy a library of games, and provided a new revenue stream for the console manufacturers through sales of these games. The Channel F console featured a variety of controls, including a new 8-way joystick designed by Lawson and a "pause" button, which was a first for a home video game console. The Channel F was not successful commercially but the cartridge approach was popularized with the Atari 2600 released in 1977.

While he was with Fairchild, Lawson was a member of the Homebrew Computer Club, a group of early computer hobbyists that included several who became well-known including Apple founders Steve Jobs and Steve Wozniak. Lawson noted he had interviewed Wozniak for a position at Fairchild but did not hire him.

In 1980, Lawson left Fairchild. He later founded Video Soft, Inc. a video game development company that made software for the Atari 2600 in the early 1980s, as the 2600 had displaced the Channel F as the top system in the market.

According to The Strong National Museum of Play, Lawson incorporated Video Soft, in Santa Clara, California, in May of 1982. The museum describes it as likely the earliest Black-owned video game development company. The company developed experimental 3D video games but experienced financial challenges that contributed to its closure.

Video Soft did not release any games, although their incomplete titles were saved and distributed to collectors in 2010. Video Soft closed about five years later, and Lawson started to take on consulting work. At one point, he worked with Stevie Wonder to produce a "Wonder Clock" that would wake a child with the sound of a parent's voice, though it never made it to production. Lawson later collaborated with the Stanford mentor program and was preparing to write a book on his career.

== Death ==
Around 2003, Lawson started having complications from diabetes, losing the use of one leg and sight from one eye. On April 9, 2011, about one month after being honored by the International Game Developers Association (IGDA), he died of complications from diabetes. At the time of his death, he resided in Santa Clara, California.

== Legacy ==
Though Alpex had created removable ROM cartridges, the contributions by Lawson's team to ensure their safe use and longevity for consumer game consoles led to him being named as the "father of the video game cartridge". In March 2011, Lawson was honored as an industry pioneer for his work on the game cartridge concept by the International Game Developers Association (IGDA). Lawson was honored posthumously with the ID@Xbox Gaming Heroes award at the 21st Independent Games Festival on March 20, 2019, for leading the development of the first cartridge-based game console.

There is a permanent display of Lawson's contribution to the gaming industry at the World Video Game Hall of Fame at The Strong National Museum of Play in Rochester, New York.

The Los Angeles Unified School District named Elementary School #11 Gerald A. Lawson Academy of the Arts, Mathematics and Science.

A short documentary on Lawson and his development of the Fairchild Channel F was produced by The Czar of Black Hollywood director Bayer Mack and released by Block Starz Music Television as part of its Profiles of African-American Success video series. He was also featured in the first episode of the Netflix limited-series documentary High Score, released August 19, 2020, with his story told by his children Karen and Anderson.

The first episode of Season 6 of Command Line Heroes, "Jerry Lawson: The Engineer Who Changed the Game", covers his work on the Channel F. Lawson is also prominently featured in the second episode of the second season of History's The Toys That Built America, "The Birth of Video Games" along with other pioneers of the early video game industry Nolan Bushnell and Ralph Baer.

University of Southern California's Games Program and Take-Two Interactive established the Gerald A. Lawson Fund in May 2021 to support black and indigenous students enrolled in the university's programming seeking careers in the video game industry. Microsoft also began contributing to the fund in August 2021.

The interactive Google Doodle game on December 1, 2022, was dedicated to Lawson to celebrate what would have been his 82nd birthday, allowing the user to make games, edit existing built-in games, and share games. On June 9, 2023, Norman Caruso's YouTube series Gaming Historian profiled Lawson and the birth of the Fairchild Channel F video game system in its episode, "The Story of the First Video Game Cartridge."

== General and cited references ==
- 2006 Vintage Computing Festival interview video
- Jerry Lawson Biography
- "SPACE Newsletter July, 1999: Legendary Hardware Pioneers to Participate in Historic Round-Table Discussion". June 10, 1999. Archived from the original on July 28, 2011.
- "Black Video Game Pioneer". Vintage Computing and Gaming (Interview). Interviewed by Edwards, Benji. February 24, 2009.
