= List of Black films of the 2010s =

The following is a list of Black films that were released in the 2010s. Black films listed here are generally associated with the peoples from the African diaspora; the cinema of Africa is distinct from this topic (see list of African films). Lawrence Ware of The New York Times said "the 2010s were the most important decade for black film in America" and that such films across various genres were "all being taken seriously critically, and most were successful financially".

== List of films ==
=== 2010 ===
Film	Date		Description
Film	Film festival	Commercial release	Description
The Book of Eli		January 5, 2010	The post-apocalyptic film stars Denzel Washington and is directed by the Hughes brothers.
Brooklyn's Finest	January 16, 2009	March 5, 2010	The crime film, directed by Antoine Fuqua, stars Don Cheadle and Wesley Snipes (along with Richard Gere and Ethan Hawke). The film is set in Brownsville, Brooklyn.
Death at a Funeral		April 16, 2010	The black comedy film is an American remake of the British film and features a predominantly black cast.
For Colored Girls		November 5, 2010	The tragedy film, directed by Tyler Perry, is an adaptation of Ntozake Shange's play about black women. The film stars Janet Jackson, Loretta Devine, Kimberly Elise, Hill Harper, Michael Ealy, Omari Hardwick Thandie Newton, Whoopi Goldberg, Kerry Washington, Macy Gray, Anika Noni Rose and Phylicia Rashad.
I Will Follow	September 18, 2010	March 11, 2011	The independent drama film, directed by Ava DuVernay, follows a woman who grieves over her aunt's recent death.
Just Wright		May 14, 2010	The romantic comedy film stars Queen Latifah as a physical therapist who falls in love with professional basketball player, played by Common.
The Karate Kid		June 11, 2010	The martial arts film, starring Jaden Smith, is a remake of the 1984 film of the same name.
Lottery Ticket		August 20, 2010	The comedy film is directed by Erik White and features an ensemble cast of black actors.
Night Catches Us	January 23, 2010	December 3, 2010	The drama film, directed by Tanya Hamilton, is set in 1976 and stars Anthony Mackie as a former Black Panther who returns to his hometown of Philadelphia. Kerry Washington also stars as the widow of a slain Panther.
Our Family Wedding		March 12, 2010	The romantic comedy film about an interracial relationship is directed by Rick Famuyiwa and stars Forest Whitaker and Lance Gross (along with America Ferrera and Carlos Mencia).
Preacher's Kid		January 29, 2010	The Christian drama film stars LeToya Luckett, Kiki Sheard, Durrell Babbs, Clifton Powell, Gregalan Williams, and Sharif Atkins.
Speed-Dating		June 4, 2010	The comedy film revolves around three black bachelors, played by Wesley Jonathan, Chico Benymon, and Leonard Robinson.
Takers		August 27, 2010	The action crime drama thriller film features an ensemble cast that includes Idris Elba, Michael Ealy, Tip "T.I." Harris, and Chris Brown.
Why Did I Get Married Too?		April 2, 2010	The comedy-drama film, produced and directed by Tyler Perry, is a sequel to Why Did I Get Married? and features a black cast.

=== 2011 ===
Film	Date		Description
Film	Film festival	Commercial release	Description
35 and Ticking		May 20, 2011	A romantic comedy about a group of friends learning what it is like to have children.
All Things Fall Apart	March 5, 2011	December 3, 2011	
Big Mommas: Like Father, Like Son		February 18, 2011	
The Black Power Mixtape 1967–1975	February 2011	April 1, 2011	
CornerStore		August 12, 2011	
Everyday Sunshine: The Story of Fishbone	June 10, 2010	October 7, 2011	
Fast Five		April 15, 2011	
The Heart Specialist		January 14, 2011	
The Help		August 10, 2011	
I Will Follow	September 18, 2010	March 11, 2011	The independent drama film, directed by Ava DuVernay, follows a woman who grieves over her aunt's recent death.
The Interrupters	January 22, 2011	July 29, 2011	
Jumping the Broom		May 6, 2011	
Kevin Hart: Laugh at My Pain		September 9, 2011	
Madea's Big Happy Family		April 22, 2011	
Mooz-lum	September 17, 2010	February 11, 2011	
Pariah	January 11, 2011	December 28, 2011	A 17-year-old girl learns to accept her lesbian identity.
Politics of Love		August 26, 2011	
Shame	September 4, 2011	January 13, 2012	

=== 2012 ===
Film	Date		Description
Film	Film festival	Commercial release	Description
Beasts of the Southern Wild	January 20, 2012	June 27, 2012	
A Beautiful Soul		May 4, 2012	
Changing the Game		May 11, 2012	
Christmas in Compton		November 9, 2012	
Django Unchained		December 25, 2012	
Flight	October 14, 2012	November 2, 2012	
Good Deeds		February 24, 2012	
Joyful Noise		January 13, 2012	
Julian Bond: Reflections from the Frontlines of the Civil Rights Movement		October 2012	
Let It Shine		June 15, 2012	
Madea's Witness Protection		June 29, 2012	
Mama, I Want to Sing!		February 14, 2012	
An Oversimplification of Her Beauty	January 21, 2012	April 12, 2013	
Red Hook Summer		August 10, 2012	
Red Tails	January 11, 2012	January 20, 2012	
The Skinny		April 6, 2012	
Sparkle		August 17, 2012	The final film of Whitney Houston
Think Like a Man	February 20, 2012	April 20, 2012	
We the Party		April 6, 2012	

=== 2013 ===
Film	Date		Description
Film	Film festival	Commercial release	Description
12 Years a Slave	August 30, 2013	November 8, 2013	
42		April 12, 2013	
1982	September 8, 2013	March 1, 2016	
After Earth		May 31, 2013	
Belle	September 8, 2013	May 2, 2014	
The Best Man Holiday		November 15, 2013	
Black Nativity		November 27, 2013	
The Butler		August 16, 2013	
Fruitvale Station	January 19, 2013	July 13, 2013	
A Haunted House		January 11, 2013	
Kevin Hart: Let Me Explain	June 22, 2013	July 3, 2013	
Mandela: Long Walk to Freedom	September 7, 2013	October 28, 2013	
Memphis	August 21, 2013	August 31, 2013	
Peeples		May 10, 2013	
The Stuart Hall Project	January 18, 2013	September 6, 2013	
Temptation: Confessions of a Marriage Counselor		March 29, 2013	

=== 2014 ===
Film	Date		Description
Film	Film festival	Commercial release	Description
About Last Night	February 11, 2014	February 14, 2014	
Addicted		October 10, 2014	
Beyond the Lights	September 6, 2014	November 14, 2014	
Blackbird	February 16, 2014	April 24, 2015	
The Czar of Black Hollywood	September 26, 2014	December 24, 2014	
Da Sweet Blood of Jesus	June 22, 2014	February 13, 2015	
Dear White People	January 18, 2014	October 17, 2014	
Fishing Without Nets	January 18, 2014	October 27, 2014	
Get on Up		August 1, 2014	
Girlhood	May 15, 2014	October 22, 2014	
Ride Along		January 17, 2014	
Selma	November 11, 2014	December 25, 2014	
Think Like a Man Too		June 20, 2014	
Through a Lens Darkly: Black Photographers and the Emergence of a People	January 27, 2014	August 27, 2014	
Top Five	September 6, 2014	December 12, 2014	
Keep on Keepin' On	April 19, 2014	September 21, 2014	

=== 2015 ===
Film	Date		Description
Film	Film festival	Commercial release	Description
Ayanda	June 13, 2015	October 2, 2015	
Beasts of No Nation	September 3, 2015	October 16, 2015	
Bessie		May 16, 2015	
The Black Panthers: Vanguard of the Revolution	January 23, 2015	September 2, 2015	
Blackbird	February 16, 2014	April 24, 2015	
Brotherly Love		April 24, 2015	
Chi-Raq		December 4, 2015	
Chocolate City		May 22, 2015	The story is focused on a college student who becomes a male stripper.
Creed		November 19, 2015	
Da Sweet Blood of Jesus	June 22, 2014	February 13, 2015	
Dope	January 24, 2015	June 19, 2015	
Fifty	October 17, 2015	December 13, 2015	
Freetown		April 8, 2015	
The Man in 3B	February 15, 2015	November 6, 2015	
Miles Ahead	October 11, 2015	April 1, 2016	
The Perfect Guy		September 2, 2015	
Runaway Island	June 12, 2015	July 25, 2015	
Straight Outta Compton		August 11, 2015	
Tangerine	January 23, 2015	July 10, 2015	
War Room		August 25, 2015	

=== 2016 ===
Film	Date		Description
Film	Film festival	Commercial release	Description
Bars4Justice	February 14, 2016		A hip hop activist gives more than his talent when he comes face to face with the justice system in Ferguson Missouri. Starring, Jasiri X, Talib Kweli, Common, Cornel West,
Barbershop: The Next Cut		April 15, 2016	
The Birth of a Nation	January 25, 2016	October 7, 2016	
Fences		December 16, 2016	
Fifty Shades of Black		January 29, 2016	
Hidden Figures		December 10, 2016	
Hunter Gatherer	March 12, 2016	November 16, 2016	
I Am Not Your Negro	September 10, 2016	February 3, 2017	
In the Hour of Chaos	February 19, 2016	July 25, 2016	
The Weekend		December 2, 2016	The film is about three friends from London who find a bag full of money and make a deal on spending the money over the weekend but trouble comes their way. Starring Joivan Wade, Percelle Ascott and Dee Kaate. Directed by Sheridan De Myers.Written by Kojo Amin.
Kiki	January 26, 2016	February 24, 2017	
Knucklehead		October 21, 2016	
Loving	May 16, 2016	November 4, 2016	
The Perfect Match		March 11, 2016	
Ride Along 2		January 15, 2016	
The Magnificent Seven	September 8, 2016	September 23, 2016	
Meet the Blacks		April 1, 2016	
Moonlight	September 2, 2016	October 21, 2016	
Queen of Katwe	September 10, 2016	October 23, 2016	Based on the true story of a chess player.
Saving Barbara Sizemore		August 26, 2016	
Southside with You	January 24, 2016	August 26, 2016	

=== 2017 ===
Film	Date		Description
Film	Film festival	Commercial release	Description
All Eyez on Me		June 16, 2017	
Black Cop	September 11, 2017	May 5, 2018	Canadian film starring Ronnie Rowe as a black police officer who takes revenge after being a victim of racial profiling.
Boo 2! A Madea Halloween		October 20, 2017	
Burning Sands	January 24, 2017	March 10, 2017	
Crown Heights	January 23, 2017	August 18, 2017	
Dayveon	January 19, 2017	September 13, 2017	
Deidra & Laney Rob a Train	January 23, 2017	March 17, 2017	
Detroit		August 4, 2017	
Get Out	January 23, 2017	February 24, 2017	
Girls Trip	June 14, 2017	July 21, 2017	
Grow House		November 20, 2017	
The Immortal Life of Henrietta Lacks		April 22, 2017	
The Incredible Jessica James	January 27, 2017	July 28, 2017	
Marshall		October 13, 2017	
Mudbound	January 27, 2017	November 17, 2017	
Roxanne Roxanne	January 22, 2017	March 23, 2018	
Sleight	January 23, 2016	April 28, 2017	
Strong Island	January 23, 2017	September 15, 2017	

=== 2018 ===
Film	Date		Description
Film	Film festival	Commercial release	Description
Acrimony		March 30, 2018	
And Breathe Normally	January 23, 2018		The Icelandic drama film features two women—a single Icelandic mother and an African political asylum seeker—whose lives intersect.
BlacKkKlansman	May 14, 2018	August 10, 2018	The American comedy-drama film, set in the early 1970s, features a black detective who infiltrates the Ku Klux Klan chapter in Colorado Springs.
Black Panther		February 16, 2018	The superhero film in the Marvel Cinematic Universe features the black superhero Black Panther. It became the ninth-highest-grossing film of all time (at the peak of the movie's success), the third-highest-grossing film in the U.S. and Canada, and the second-highest-grossing film of 2018.
Blindspotting	January 18, 2018	July 20, 2018	The American comedy-drama film features two friends, a black man and a white man, who work as movers and experience the gentrification of the neighborhood in Oakland, California where they grew up.
A Boy. A Girl. A Dream.	January 22, 2018	September 14, 2018	The American romantic drama film, set on the night of the 2016 United States Presidential election, features a Los Angeles club promoter who meets a visitor from the Midwestern United States, and the two embark on a journey to challenge each other and realize their dreams.
Brian Banks	September 22, 2018	August 9, 2019	
Burden	January 21, 2018	February 28, 2020	The drama film features a member of the Ku Klux Klan in 1996 South Carolina who tries to leave the organization with the help of an African-American pastor.
Canal Street	June 13, 2018	January 11, 2019	
Come Sunday	January 21, 2018	April 13, 2018	The drama film stars an evangelist who preaches that there is no hell and is subsequently kicked out of his church.
Crime + Punishment	January 19, 2018	August 24, 2018	
Farming	September 8, 2018	October 25, 2019	
The First Purge		July 4, 2018	The horror film, the fourth installment in the Purge franchise, features black and brown perspectives.
Green Book	September 11, 2018	November 21, 2018	The American comedy-drama, based on a true story, follows African-American classical pianist Don Shirley being transported around concerts in the American South by a racist Italian-American driver.
Hale County This Morning, This Evening	January 18, 2018	September 14, 2018	
The Hate U Give	September 7, 2018	October 19, 2018	
If Beale Street Could Talk	September 9, 2018	November 30, 2018	The film, directed by Barry Jenkins, is an adaptation of If Beale Street Could Talk by James Baldwin.
King in the Wilderness	January 23, 2018	April 2, 2018	The documentary film explores the last years of Martin Luther King Jr.
Mariannes Noires		July 13, 2018	
Matangi/Maya/M.I.A.	January 21, 2018	September 28, 2018	The documentary features the Sri Lankan artist and musician M.I.A.
Minding the Gap	January 21, 2018	August 17, 2018	The documentary features three skateboarding friends in Rockford, Illinois, including a black teenager whose experience differs from his friends'.
Monster	January 22, 2018	March 30, 2021	The drama film is based on the novel of the same name by Walter Dean Myers.
Monsters and Men	January 19, 2018	September 28, 2018	The drama film features a black man in Bedford–Stuyvesant, Brooklyn who catches on video the wrongful shooting by a white police officer and who faces a dilemma about releasing the video or not. The film also explores others' lives based on the fallout from the shooting.
Mr. Soul!	April 22, 2018	August 28, 2020	
Night Comes On	January 19, 2018	August 3, 2018	The drama film features a black woman who is released from juvenile detention on her 18th birthday. She teams up with her ten-year-old sister to avenge their mother's death.
Night School		September 28, 2018	The American comedy film is directed by Malcolm D. Lee, produced by Will Packer, and stars Kevin Hart (who also produced) and Tiffany Haddish.
Proud Mary		January 18, 2018	In the action thriller film, Taraji P. Henson plays hitwoman Mary.
The Public	January 31, 2018	April 5, 2019	After learning that emergency shelters are at full capacity when a brutal Midwestern cold front makes its way to Cincinnati, Ohio, a large group of homeless library patrons refuse to leave the downtown public library at closing time.
Quincy	September 9, 2018	September 21, 2018	The American documentary film features the life of American record producer, singer and film producer Quincy Jones.
Sorry to Bother You	January 20, 2018	July 6, 2018	The comedy film, set in Oakland, California, features a telemarketer who discovers a magical ability that empowers him to succeed in his profession.
Spider-Man: Into the Spider-Verse		December 14, 2018	The superhero film features the Afro-Latino superhero Miles Morales / Spider-Man.
Step Sisters		January 19, 2018	The comedy film stars a black sorority sister who teaches step dance to her white sorority sisters.
Superfly		June 13, 2018	The crime film, a remake of the 1972 blaxploitation film Super Fly, features a cocaine dealer who is attempting to make one last successful deal before quitting drug-dealing for life.
Tales from the Hood 2		October 2, 2018	
This One's for the Ladies	March 12, 2018	May 1, 2019	
Tyrel	January 20, 2018	December 7, 2018	The drama film features a group of male friends taking a trip to the Catskill Mountains for a birthday weekend. The only black man in the group, Tyler, begins to feel uneasy among the alcohol and testosterone.
The Weekend	September 11, 2018	September 13, 2019	Romantic comedy starring Sasheer Zamata, Tone Bell, and DeWanda Wise. Written and directed by Stella Meghie.
What You Gonna Do When the World's on Fire?	September 2, 2018	August 16, 2019	
Where Hands Touch	September 9, 2018	September 14, 2018	
Widows	September 8, 2018	November 6, 2018	The English-language heist film, directed by Steve McQueen, stars actresses Viola Davis and Cynthia Erivo among others.
A Wrinkle in Time		March 9, 2018	The fantasy film, based on the 1962 novel, features a mixed race girl, her brother, and her friend embarking on a search for her missing father.
Yardie	January 20, 2018	August 24, 2018	The crime film is an adaptation of the 1993 novel of the same name.

=== 2019 ===
Film	Date		Description
Film	Film festival	Commercial release	Description
21 Bridges		November 22, 2019	The American crime film stars Chadwick Boseman as a NYPD detective.
The Apollo	April 24, 2019	November 8, 2019	
Black and Blue	September 21, 2019	October 25, 2019	The American crime film, directed by Deon Taylor, stars Naomie Harris as a NOPD police officer.
Blue Story		November 22, 2019	
Bolden		May 3, 2019	
The Boy Who Harnessed the Wind	January 25, 2019	March 1, 2019	The British drama film, directed by Chiwetel Ejiofor, features a Malawian boy who comes up with an invention to save his village from famine.
Brian Banks	September 22, 2018	August 9, 2019	
Burning Cane	April 25, 2019	November 6, 2019	
Clemency	January 27, 2019	December 27, 2019	
Dolemite Is My Name	September 7, 2019	October 4, 2019	
Don't Let Go	January 27, 2019	August 2, 2019	
Fast Color	March 10, 2018	April 19, 2019	
From Zero to I Love You	March 26, 2019		
Guava Island	April 11, 2019	April 13, 2019	
Harriet	September 10, 2019	November 1, 2019	
Hell on the Border		December 13, 2019	The biographical Western film features Bass Reeves, the first black deputy U.S. marshal west of the Mississippi River, portrayed by David Gyasi.
Horror Noire		February 7, 2019	
The Intruder		May 3, 2019	
Just Mercy	September 6, 2019	December 25, 2019	
The Last Black Man in San Francisco	January 26, 2019	August 30, 2019	
Little		April 12, 2019	
Luce	January 27, 2019	August 2, 2019	
A Madea Family Funeral		March 1, 2019	
Native Son	January 24, 2019	April 6, 2019	
No Lye: An American Beauty Story	November 28, 2019	February 28, 2020	The rise and decline of the Black-owned ethnic beauty industry.
Pick	September 2019		Short drama about the social consequences faced by a young girl after she goes to school on class picture day wearing her natural hair instead of straightening it.
Premature	January 26, 2019	February 21, 2020	
Queen & Slim	November 15, 2019	November 27, 2019	
Shaft		June 14, 2019	
See You Yesterday		May 17, 2019	
This One's for the Ladies	March 12, 2018	May 1, 2019	
Thriller	September 23, 2018	April 14, 2019	
Traveling While Black	January 25, 2019		Virtual reality project depicting black motorists traveling with the help of the Negro Motorist Green Book.
Us	March 8, 2019	March 22, 2019	The horror film is written and directed by Jordan Peele and stars Winston Duke and Lupita Nyong'o.
Waves	August 30, 2019	November 15, 2019	
What Men Want		February 8, 2019	

== Bibliography ==
- Berry, S. Torriano; Berry, Venise T. (2015), Historical Dictionary of African American Cinema, Historical Dictionaries of Literature and the Arts, Rowman & Littlefield Publishers, ISBN 978-1-4422-4701-7
