= In the Hour of Chaos =

- Promotional release poster
- Directed by: Bayer Mack
- Produced by: Frances Presley Rice; Bayer Mack; Victor Young; Hal Croasmun; Nanci Grady; Gabriell Debear Paye
- Edited by: Bayer Mack
- Distributed by: Block Starz Music Television
- Release date: February 19, 2016 (GCUFF)
- Running time: 105 minutes
- Country: United States
- Language: English

In the Hour of Chaos is a 2016 American documentary film directed by Bayer Mack about the life and trials of the Reverend Martin Luther King Sr. ("Daddy King"), father of civil rights leader Martin Luther King Jr.

The film's ensemble voice cast uses first-person narration sourced from autobiographies and biographies about Daddy King, family attorney Murray M. Silver and other King relatives and associates.

== Synopsis ==
Set against a backdrop of sociopolitical intrigue and anarchy spanning three generations of the King family, In the Hour of Chaos also goes behind-the-scenes of America's major domestic conflicts and takes a critical view of liberalism's effect on the black civil rights movement.

== Cast ==
- Jazz Walker as Martin Luther King Sr.
- Lynnette Holmes as Coretta Scott King
- Jason Dorough as Murray M. Silver Sr. / Lester G. Maddox
- Ugo Anomelechi as Bayard Rustin / Roy Wilkins
- Rachel Skyy as Ella Baker
- Sean O'Neil as Hoke Smith / Harris Wofford
- Malcolm X as himself

== Release ==
In the Hour of Chaos was released on February 19, 2016 as part of a Black History Month event sponsored by the Greater Cleveland Urban Film Festival (GCUFF), which included writer/director Bayer Mack's debut film The Czar of Black Hollywood, and premiered on public television on July 25, 2016. The film was featured at San Francisco's de Young Museum as part of the Bay Area's "MLK Day of Revelations".

== Accolades ==
In the Hour of Chaos was an official documentary selection of the 2017 San Francisco Black Film Festival and named Runner Up.

== See also ==
- Civil rights movement in popular culture
- List of black films of the 2010s
