= Profiles of African-American Success =

- Created by: Frances Presley-Rice
- Presented by: Various
- Country of origin: United States
- No. of seasons: 7
- No. of episodes: 20

Production
- Executive producers: Frances Presley-Rice; Bayer Mack
- Running time: 2-4 minutes per episode
- Production company: Block Starz Music Television

Original release
- Network: BSMTV
- Release: 2014 – present

Profiles of African-American Success is an American documentary web series produced by Frances Presley-Rice and filmmaker Bayer Mack for their production company Block Starz Music Television. The documentary series features short biographies of African-American businesses and entrepreneurs.

== Development ==
Profiles of African-American Success was originally developed by executive producer Frances Presley-Rice in conjunction with The Washington Times as a ten-part weekly video series for Dr. Ben Carson's digital magazine, American CurrentSee. The series is now distributed exclusively by BSMTV through its official website, Vimeo and YouTube channels and on various community television stations. During the promotion for his documentary film, The Czar of Black Hollywood, director Bayer Mack said his goal with Profiles of African-American Success was to carry on The Czar of Black Hollywood's theme of celebrating black Americans who succeeded in the face of Jim Crow and other challenges.

== Featured profiles ==
Profiles of African-American Success has featured the following black entrepreneurs and institutions:

- Junius G. Groves: Gilded Age Business Magnate
- Robert S. Abbott: Millionaire Newspaper Publisher
- Jeremiah G. Hamilton: The Dark Prince of Wall Street
- Harry H. Pace: America's First Black Record Label Owner
- Frederick D. Patterson: America's Only Black Car Manufacturer
- Homer B. Roberts: America's First Black Auto Dealer
- Reginald F. Lewis: America's First Black Billion Dollar Businessman
- Paul R. Williams: Architect to the Stars
- Don H. Barden: King of Detroit
- Richard "Dick" Griffey: Music Industry Kingpin
- Alpha Kappa Alpha: A Legacy of Sisterhood and Service
- Sylvia Robinson: Mother of Hip-Hop
- Gamble and Huff: The Sound of Philadelphia
- The Million Man March: 20 Year Anniversary
- Miss Black America: The Pageant Changed History
- Vee-Jay Records: Most Successful Black Owned Label Before Motown
- George E. Johnson, Sr.: First Black Company on American Stock Exchange
- Cathy L. Hughes: First Black Woman to Head a Publicly-traded Company
- Jerry Lawson: A Black Man Developed the First Cartridge Video Game Console
- Black Journal: America's Most Dangerous Public Television Show

== Narrators ==
Season 1 of Profiles of African-American Success was presented by William Bell, who had worked with the producers on The Czar of Black Hollywood. Seasons 2 and 3 employed relatively unknown African-American voice actors and actresses. The premiere episode for Season 4 features narration by noted media professional Dyana Williams in a tribute to her friend, Radio One founder Cathy Hughes.

== Reception ==
The critical and public response to the documentary series has been generally favorable with many praising its effort to showcase positive aspects of the African-American experience.
