= Homer Roberts =

Homer Roberts may refer to:

- Homer B. Roberts, first black person to attain the rank of lieutenant in the United States Army Signal Corps
- Homer Roberts (The OA), fictional character
