= Alvin J. Boutte =

American banker and businessman (1929–2012)

- Born: October 10, 1929; Lake Charles, Louisiana, U.S.
- Died: April 1, 2012 (aged 82); Hazel Crest, Illinois, U.S.
- Occupations: Banker, businessman

Alvin J. Boutte Sr. (October 10, 1929 – April 1, 2012) was an American banker and businessman. He was co-founder, CEO, and chairman of Independence Bank — the largest Black-owned bank in the United States in the 1970s — and its holding company, Indecorp, Inc., which reclaimed that title in the 1990s with more than $200 million in assets.

He was connected to many civil rights leaders of the 20th century, including Martin Luther King Jr., Jesse Jackson, and Harold Washington. The Chicago Tribune once described him as a "moderate militant."

== Early life ==
Boutte was born and raised in Lake Charles, Louisiana, the youngest of 10 children in a Louisiana Creole family. His parents were Arthur Hyacinthe Boutte, Sr., and the former Adorea Darensbourg. Arthur Boutte was listed as an "odd-job laborer" in the 1930 census and an office janitor in the 1940 census.

Growing up in Jim Crow Louisiana, the Bouttes faced racism and discrimination. Speaking of his father, Boutte told a biographer: "I can remember how he'd dress me up and we'd walk down to the voting place and they'd tell him, 'You know you can't vote.' He'd just walk back and try again the next time. I guess I should be bitter, but I'm not."

Boutte attended Sacred Heart Catholic High School in Lake Charles and then Xavier University of Louisiana on a basketball scholarship, earning a bachelor's degree in pharmacology in 1951. One of his classmates there was Ernest "Dutch" Morial, who would later become the first Black mayor of New Orleans.

After graduation, Boutte joined the U.S. Army, attending Officer Candidate School, where he finished second in a class of 220. He was honorably discharged in 1954 with the rank of captain, having been stationed in Germany.

He settled in the Black middle-class neighborhood of Chatham-Avalon on Chicago's South Side and began work at a local drugstore named Lakeside Pharmacy. A year later, with a $28,000 loan, he bought the store. Within a few years, he'd opened three new locations under the name Independent Drug Stores. He quickly became a leader in a growing group of Black entrepreneurs in Chicago.

== Independence Bank ==
In 1964, with several other Chicago Black businessmen, he co-founded Independence Bank. A key partner was George E. Johnson Sr., founder of the cosmetics and haircare company Johnson Products; both he and Boutte had been frustrated by the difficulties Black businessmen faced accessing capital at white-owned banks. Initially, Johnson was the bank's chairman and Boutte its vice chairman. But the bank got off to a rocky start, so in 1969 Boutte sold his pharmacy chain and moved from bank investor to bank president. Within three years, Independence's assets had grown from $16 million to $55 million. By 1973, it was the largest Black-owned bank in the United States, and in 1977, it opened a new $4 million headquarters on Chicago's South Side.

Independence became a consolidator of other Black-owned banks with lesser financial positions. In 1979, state and federal regulators asked it to take over two ailing banks, Gateway National and Guaranty Bank and Trust. Boutte arranged what was at the time the largest corporate loan ever made by American minority-owned institutions—$12 million to the auto-parts manufacturer Borg-Warner—by assembling a syndicate of 80 Black- and women-owned banks. In 1981, Boutte took over the bank's chairmanship from Johnson.

In 1988, Independence Bank – now part of the Boutte-created holding company Indecorp – announced it was buying Chicago's Drexel National Bank, the first time a Black-owned bank had ever purchased a financially healthy white-owned bank. Together, Independence and Drexel had assets of $227 million, making Indecorp again the largest Black-owned banking company. He expanded the banks' work in new directions, including running foreign currency exchange at O'Hare International Airport.

But in a newly deregulated banking environment, Indecorp had trouble competing with increasingly large white banks. An attempted sale-merger with Black-owned Omnibanc Corp. of Detroit fell through in 1994. The following year, Indecorp was bought by the holding company of ShoreBank and its 31 years as a Black-owned bank came to a close. At the time of its sale, Indecorp held assets of an estimated $279 million. ShoreBank collapsed in 2010 as a result of losses during the Great Recession.

== Activism and politics ==
Boutte was an active supporter of the civil rights movement and African American interests. In the 1960s, he led a group of Chicago businessmen who raised $55,000 to support the Southern Christian Leadership Conference and the work of Martin Luther King Jr.

In 1972, he was an organizer and treasurer of the National Black Political Convention, which brought 8,000 people to Gary, Indiana for what has been called, "in many ways, the culmination of the Black Power era." The convention issued the Gary Declaration, which called for Black Americans "to consolidate and organize our own Black role as the vanguard in the struggle for a new society. To accept the challenge is to move to independent Black politics...History leaves us no other choice. White politics has not and cannot bring the changes we need."

He was a longtime ally of the Rev. Jesse Jackson, serving on the first board of his Operation PUSH and later becoming its chairman. He was also vice president of the Chicago Urban League, and a fundraiser for the Chicago NAACP.

In 1977, Boutte was one of the organizers of the Committee for a Black Mayor, which tried to create an informal process to determine who would be the strongest candidate. It was formed in the weeks following the death of longtime mayor Richard J. Daley. Political maneuvering had denied the position of acting mayor to Wilson Frost, the African American president pro tempore of the Chicago City Council, which many Blacks considered a racist act. Boutte co-chaired the selection committee with the labor leader and future Congressman Charles Hayes. Boutte was initially considered as a possible choice for mayor, but he withdrew his name from consideration. The committee selected Harold Washington, but in the end he declined to run. Washington instead ran for Congress, winning in 1980 and 1982.

Immediately after that 1982 re-election, Boutte was the first person approached to fund a potential Washington run for mayor. He committed to raise $50,000; Washington announced his candidacy a few days later. Boutte was considered key to his campaign, which ended with his election as the city's first Black mayor.

In 1993, Boutte was part of a group of businessmen who brought the newly freed Nelson Mandela to Chicago to raise funds for the African National Congress.

Boutte was a member of the Chicago Board of Education from 1969 to 1974. The Chicago Tribune described him upon his appointment as "a 'moderate militant' with strong convictions about improving the education of Chicago's black children." Late in his term, he attempted to step down from his post, citing his business responsibilities, but Mayor Richard J. Daley refused to accept his resignation. He was part of a liberal bloc on the board, but expressed frustration with intra-board power struggles.

== Civic and business interests ==
Boutte was active in many Chicago civic organizations, sitting on the boards of the Chicago Symphony Orchestra and the YMCA of Metropolitan Chicago, as well as serving as vice chairman of the city's Better Business Bureau. In business, he was a board member of the Johnson Products Company and Chicago Metropolitan Mutual Assurance, both Black-owned businesses in Chicago, as well as Midway Airlines and Blue Cross Blue Shield Illinois. Boutte was also part of a consortium of Black Chicago businessmen to invest in Stellar Continental Cable, an early cable television system there.

== Personal life ==
Boutte married Barbara Gonzaque, whom he met at Xavier. They had four children, daughters Janice and Jeanette and sons Gregory and Alvin, Jr. The family is Catholic.

Alvin Boutte died on April 1, 2012, at his home in Hazel Crest, Illinois, at age 82. His widow Barbara died in 2017.
