= Boutte =

Boutte or Boutté may refer to

== Places ==
- Boutte, Louisiana, a census-designated place in United States

== People ==
- Alvin J. Boutte (1929–2012), American banker and businessman, founder of the largest Black-owned bank in the U.S., Chicago civic leader and civil rights activist
- Denise Boutte (born 1982), American actress and model
- Duane Boutte (born 1966), American actor, director, and composer
- Etnah Rochon Boutte (1880–1973), African-American educator, pharmacist, and clubwoman
- John Boutté (born 1958), American jazz singer
- Kayshon Boutte (born 2002), American football player
- Lillian Boutté (1949–2025), American jazz singer
- Marc Boutte (1969–2025), American football player
