= Jeff Stilson =

American comedian (born 1959)

- Born: c. 1959; Spokane, Washington, U.S.
- Notable work: Producer/writer – The Chris Rock Show

Comedy career
- Medium: Stand-up

Jeff Stilson (born c. 1959) is an American stand-up comedian, writer and TV producer.

== Biography ==
Stilson was born in Spokane, Washington. He began his stand-up career in Seattle in the mid-1980s. As a stand-up he has appeared on Late Night with David Letterman, The Tonight Show, Comedy Central, The Late Late Show with Craig Ferguson, and was a regular guest on The Panel in Australia. He has also won two Emmy Awards and received 14 nominations as a comedy writer and producer. Stilson was one of five comedians to appear on the 14th Annual Young Comedians Special for HBO in 1991. He worked as a writer for The Late Show with David Letterman, and as a producer and writer for The Chris Rock Show, Da Ali G Show, Last Comic Standing and The Daily Show, and many others.

Stilson is friends with Chris Rock and worked with him to make the documentary Good Hair, receiving a nomination for the Writers Guild of America Award for Best Documentary Screenplay.
