= Good Hair =

2009 American comedy documentary film by Jeff Stilson

- Theatrical release poster
- Directed by: Jeff Stilson
- Written by: Lance Crouther; Paul Marchand; Chris Rock; Chuck Sklar; Jeff Stilson
- Produced by: Jenny Hunter; Kevin O'Donnell
- Narrated by: Chris Rock
- Cinematography: Cliff Charles; Mark Henderson
- Edited by: Paul Marchand; Greg Nash
- Music by: Marcus Miller
- Production companies: HBO Films; LD Entertainment; Chris Rock Productions
- Distributed by: Roadside Attractions
- Release dates: January 18, 2009 (Sundance); October 9, 2009 (United States)
- Running time: 96 minutes
- Country: United States
- Language: English
- Box office: $4 million

Good Hair is a 2009 American documentary film directed by Jeff Stilson and produced by Chris Rock Productions and HBO Films, starring and narrated by comedian Chris Rock. Premiering at the Sundance Film Festival on January 18, 2009, Good Hair had a limited release to theaters in the United States by Roadside Attractions on October 9, 2009, and opened across the country on October 23.

The film centers on the issue of how African-American women have perceived their hair and historically styled it. The film explores the modern-day styling industry for black women, images of what is considered acceptable and desirable for African-American women's hair in the United States, and their relation to African-American culture.

== Overview ==
According to Rock, he was inspired to make the film after his three-year-old daughter Lola asked him, "Daddy, how come I don't have good hair?" She has curly, wiry hair typical of many people of African descent. He realized she had already absorbed the perception among some black people that curly hair was not "good".

Rock delves into the $9 billion, black-owned hair industry, and visits such places as beauty salons, barbershops, and hairstyling conventions to explore popular approaches to styling. He visits scientific laboratories to learn the science behind chemical relaxers that straighten hair.

Rock intended to explore the topic seriously, but with humor. The movie features interviews from hair care industry businesspeople, stylists (Derek J, Jason Griggers and others) and their customers, and celebrities such as Ice-T, Nia Long, Paul Mooney, T-Pain, Raven-Symoné, Maya Angelou, KRS-One, Salt-n-Pepa, Kerry Washington, Eve, Reverend Al Sharpton, Andre Harrell, Tracie Thoms, Lauren London, and Meagan Good. These public figures discuss their experiences with their own hair, and the issue of how different types and characteristics of black hair are perceived in the black community.

== Themes ==
Rock explores why black women adopt so many different styles for their hair. Techniques designed to straighten hair appear to be intended to give it characteristics of Eurocentric (or "white") hair. Other styles create elaborate designs related to African traditions and recent innovations in fashion. Rock is quoted as saying, "I knew women wanted to be beautiful, but I didn't know the lengths they would go to, the time they would spend—and not complain about it. In fact, they appear to look forward to it."

== Interviews with public figures ==
The film features interviews with prominent entertainers and other public figures, including Nia Long, Ice-T, Raven-Symoné, Maya Angelou, Salt-n-Pepa, Eve, Tracie Thoms, and Reverend Al Sharpton. They provide opinions on "good hair" and recount personal experiences in dealing with their hair.

In Jeannette Catsoulis' review of the film, she notes that Rock questions why African-American women adopt a concept of "beauty" that is not based on the natural characteristics of their hair. Some endure sometimes-painful hair treatments in order to achieve this definition of beauty. If the treatments, such as hair relaxers, are done improperly, they can cause hair loss or burns on the scalp.

Al Sharpton says, "We wear our economic oppression on our heads." He refers to the hair business, which yields billions of dollars in revenues and has changed from African-American manufacturers to Asian manufacturers, redirecting the profits from the industry out of the African-American community.

To gain insights into the cultural issue, Rock also interviewed students and faculty at Santa Monica High School, customers in hair salons and barbershops, and hair dealers. He visited Dudley Products, one of the few companies owned by African-Americans that make hair products for the African-American community.

== Reception ==
The film met with positive reviews from critics. Good Hair currently holds a 94% rating on review aggregator Rotten Tomatoes based on 85 reviews, with an average score of 7.2/10. The website's critics consensus reads: "Funny, informative, and occasionally sad, Good Hair is a provocative look at the complex relationship between African Americans and their hair." Another review aggregation website, Metacritic, gave the film an average score of 72/100 based on 27 reviews. It received the Special Jury Prize Documentary at the 2009 Sundance Film Festival.

Good Hair opened in limited release on October 9, 2009, becoming the 14th highest-grossing film for the weekend of October 9–11, 2009 with $1,039,220 in 186 theaters with a $5,587 average. The film expanded to 466 theaters on October 23.

In his review, Roger Ebert stated "Few people of any race wear completely natural hair. If they did, we would be a nation of Unabombers." Rock responded to critics on The Oprah Winfrey Show, saying "it's not important what's on top of your head—it's important what's inside of your head. That is the theme of the movie."

=== Lawsuit from Regina Kimbell ===
On October 5, 2009, documentary filmmaker Regina Kimbell filed a lawsuit in a Los Angeles court against Chris Rock Productions, HBO Films, and Good Hair's American and international distributors. Kimbell charged that Rock's film is an illegal infringement of her similarly themed documentary, My Nappy Roots: A Journey Through Black Hair-itage, which she says she screened for Rock in 2007. Kimbell sought an injunction against the wide release of Good Hair, but a federal judge allowed Rock's film to be released as scheduled.

=== Rock on The Oprah Winfrey Show ===
Rock appeared on The Oprah Winfrey Show to promote and discuss his film. During his second appearance, a roundtable of prominent Black women, some from the fashion industry, discussed the issue of hair and self-esteem. Mikki Taylor, beauty and cover editor for Essence, and Ayana Byrd, an editor for Glamour, questioned whether the phrase was still apt.

== Recognition and honors ==
The film received the Special Jury Prize for a Documentary at the 2009 Sundance Film Festival. Chris Rock, Jeff Stilson, Lance Crouther, and Chuck Sklar were nominated for Best Documentary Screenplay from the Writers Guild of America.

== Legacy ==
In the wake of Chris Rock's comments on Jada Pinkett Smith's hairstyle at the 94th Academy Awards, as well as Will Smith's publicly slapping Rock in response to it, Time reported many Black women took to Twitter to reassess the film. One of the film's interviewees, interior designer Sheila Bridges, who has alopecia, criticized Rock for his joke about Pinkett Smith on her Instagram page, saying, "Shame on you @chrisrock. Didn't we sit down and talk at length about how painfully humiliating and difficult it is to navigate life as a bald woman in a society that is hair obsessed?"

== See also ==
- My Nappy Roots: A Journey Through Black Hair-itage (2006 documentary)
- No Lye: An American Beauty Story (2019 documentary)
