= Bayer Mack =

American record executive (born 1972)

- Born: Bayer Leevince Mack; August 26, 1972; Murfreesboro, Tennessee, United States
- Education: Middle Tennessee State University
- Occupations: Music executive; journalist; film producer
- Years active: 1993–present
- Works: The Czar of Black Hollywood; In the Hour of Chaos; Profiles of African-American Success; No Lye: An American Beauty Story; Black Seeds: The History of Africans in America
- Awards: 2015, 2020 Black Reel Awards

Bayer Leevince Mack (born August 26, 1972) is an American record executive and filmmaker. He is the publisher of the late-1990s, early-2000s urban entertainment website HOT 104.com, the founder of Block Starz Music and the director of The Czar of Black Hollywood.

== Early life and education ==
Mack attended Central Middle School (now Central Magnet School) and Oakland High School. He is an alumnus of Middle Tennessee State University where he majored in journalism and wrote for the school's editorially independent, student-run newspaper, Sidelines.

== Career ==
Mack relocated to Louisville, Kentucky in the mid-1990s and founded the dot-com company Infinity-Digital. His website HOT 104.com gained notoriety after a story it published about the shooting death of Tyisha Miller by police officers in Riverside, CA went viral. In 1999, Mack signed an affiliate contract with the AKA.com Hip-Hop Network created by Loud Records founder Steve Rifkind. In addition to Hip-Hop reviews, chart analysis, entertainment news, MP3 downloads and African-American swimsuit models, Mack routinely published editorials that touched on hot-button issues, like ineffective African-American leadership and sexual violence against women. HOT 104.com also covered several police shootings.

=== Block Starz Music ===
Mack became the marketing manager of a German hip-hop website called YoRaps.com in 2008. Later that year, he and the site's owner, Kai Denninger, formed an online record label called Block Starz Music to promote free mixtapes by the independent and unsigned artists featured in YoRaps' “Next 2 Blow” section, like Rasheeda. The label's early association with Wiz Khalifa helped boost the company's profile and attracted other artists.

=== Documentary films ===
Mack made his directorial debut in 2014 with the documentary film Oscar Micheaux: The Czar of Black Hollywood. He self-financed the project and released it independently through his production studio, Block Starz Music Television. In an April 2014 interview with The Washington Times, Mack said he was inspired to produce a film about Oscar Micheaux's life because it mirrored his own. Mack is also executive producer of the web series, Profiles of African-American Success. In 2016, he wrote and directed the Martin Luther King Sr. documentary In the Hour of Chaos, which takes a critical view of liberalism's effect on the black civil rights movement. The film was named runner-up at the San Francisco Black Film Festival and was featured at San Francisco's de Young Museum as part of the Bay Area's "MLK Day of Revelations". In 2019, Mack wrote and directed a documentary film on the rise and decline of the black-owned ethnic beauty industry, called No Lye: An American Beauty Story. Mack's film Black Seeds: The History of Africans in America won the "Best Feature Documentary" award and a $20,000 camera package from Panavision at the 2021 Denton Black Film Festival.

== Filmography ==
=== Film ===
Year	Title	Role	Note(s)
2014	The Czar of Black Hollywood	Writer/Director	Documentary
2016	In the Hour of Chaos	Writer/Director	Documentary
2019	No Lye: An American Beauty Story	Writer/Director	Documentary
2021	Black Seeds: The History of Africans in America	Writer/Director	Documentary
2022	Black Seeds: Book II	Writer/Director	Documentary
TBA	The Last Black Action Hero	Writer/Director	Documentary
