= Music executive =

Person making executive decisions over artists of a record label

A music executive or record executive is a person within a music company, particularly a record label, who works in senior management and makes executive decisions regarding the label's artists. Their roles vary greatly, but they may oversee one or more aspects of a record label, including A&R, contracts, management, publishing, production, manufacturing, marketing/promotion, distribution, copyright, and touring. Although music executives typically work in senior management, some have gone on to establish record labels of their own. Some of these owners begin their careers in the music industry as artists, A&R representatives, or producers, establishing their reputations as they make connections, hone their craft, or both.

Music executives work in a variety of settings for major record labels such as Universal Music Group, Sony Music Entertainment, or Warner Music Group. However, many choose to work with, or start their own independent record labels such as Sub Pop, Block Starz Music, Ironworks, Jagjaguwar, Perry Music Group, 50/50innertainment, and 419 Records.

== See also ==
- Record producer
- Electronic music
- Audio engineer
- Musician
- Hip hop production
