= Johnson Products Company =

American manufacturer of hair care and cosmetic products

The Johnson Products Company (JPC) is a privately held American business based in Chicago, Illinois, that manufactures a line of hair care and cosmetic products for African-American consumers under the names Afro Sheen and Ultra Sheen. The company was a longtime sponsor of the syndicated US television dance show Soul Train until that program's cancellation.

== History ==
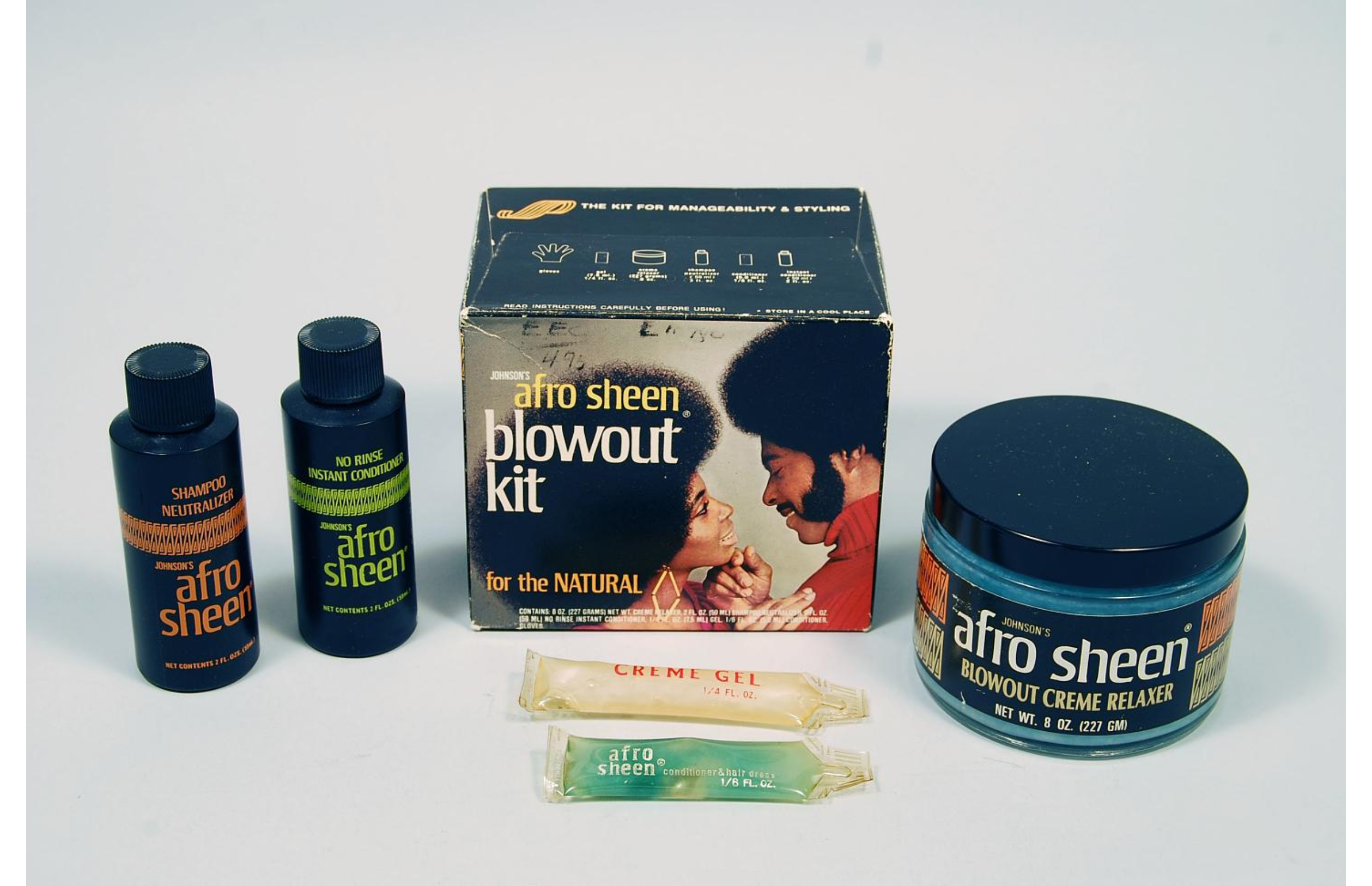
Afro Sheen Blowout Kit, Liquid

In 1954, salesman George E. Johnson, Sr., his wife Joan Johnson, and a barber who later left the company formed what would become Johnson Products with a $250 loan. The company produced Ultra Wave, a hair relaxer aimed at men that George developed while at Fuller Products, an African-American cosmetics company. The product was sold in Chicago, Harlem and other African-American neighborhoods of New York City to barbers.

Joan repositioned the product in 1957 as Ultra Sheen and marketed it to women. The product was aimed at African-American women who straightened their hair to eliminate the need to use a hot comb, grease, and frequent trips to the beauty shop. By the 1960s it had an estimated 80 percent of the black hair-care market and annual sales of $12.6 million by 1970. In 1971, JPC went public and was the first African-American-owned company to trade on the American Stock Exchange.

The company's most well-known product was Afro Sheen for natural hair when afros became popular. Marketing for the product featured slogans that encouraged racial pride, as embodied by the "Black is beautiful" movement. These slogans included "Natural Hair hangs out. Beautiful!" and "soul food for the natural." In 1971, JPC began sponsoring Soul Train. The sponsorship helped the program grow from a local show to a nationally syndicated cultural icon, making JPC the first African-American company to sponsor a national television program. In 1976, annual sales had grown to $40 million and had 500 employees in Chicago and a factory in Nigeria.

In 1989, George and Joan divorced and as part of the divorce settlement, Joan became chairman and principal shareholder while their son Eric G. Johnson, was named chief executive. In 1992, Eric resigned from the company, which was reportedly due to poor relations with Joan. Ivax Corp purchased the company in 1993 and merged it with its line of skin care and cosmetic products for black women, Flori Roberts. The sale ended its control by African-American investors.

The company was bought by Procter & Gamble in 2004 and its products were marketed as part of the P&G portfolio. In March 2009, a consortium of African-American investment firms bought the company from P&G to reestablish its position as an African-American-owned company.
