= Lega-C =

American rapper

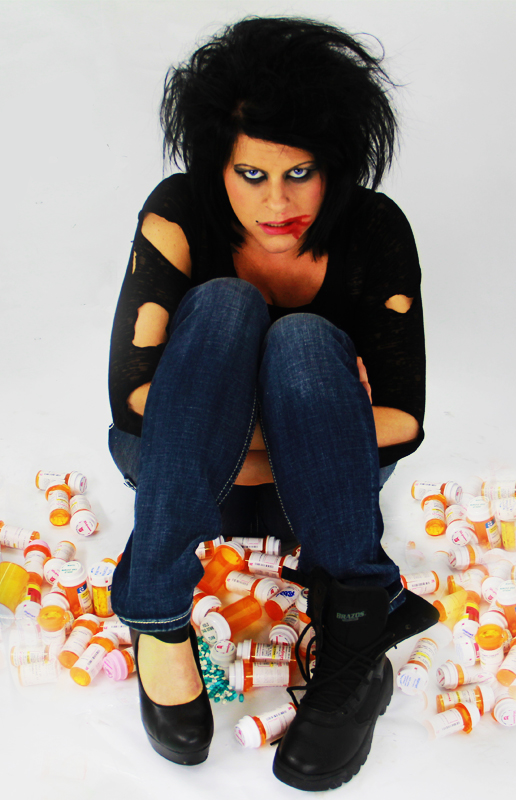
- Lega-C in January 2012 publicity photo for her album Off My Medication.

Background information
- Born: Danielle McLean; June 18, 1976 (age 50); Ann Arbor, Michigan, USA
- Origin: Tulsa, Oklahoma, United States
- Genres: Hip hop
- Occupations: Rapper, singer, producer
- Years active: 2005–present
- Labels: Cheerz 2 U Entertainment, Decka Records, Block Starz Music

Danielle McLean, better known by her stage name Lega-C, is a rapper, singer, songwriter, and record producer from Tulsa, Oklahoma. She is known for her viral YouTube video "White Girl Raps Fast" (2011) and her remixes of "She Will" by Lil Wayne and Drake and "Worldwide Choppers" by Tech N9ne from her mixtape Who Got Tha Heater (2011).

== Early life ==
Born in Ann Arbor, Michigan, McLean moved to Tulsa, Oklahoma when she was five. McLean's parents were children's church pastors at Faith Christian Fellowship (FCF) located in the predominantly black North Side of Tulsa and threw Friday night parties at a community recreational center to give at-risk kids a place to go other than the streets. Immersed in black culture, McLean wrote and performed her first rap at age ten during a church talent show.

While in middle school, McLean learned to play piano by ear, but by her senior year of high school, she was being regularly suspended for fighting and later found out she was pregnant. After graduation, she was arrested for stealing and identity theft and was incarcerated while pregnant. McLean was released from jail shortly before giving birth to a daughter and began hustling to support herself and the child.

== Music career ==
=== 2006–2010: Early career ===
Her self-produced independent album Underestimated (2006) sold 5000 copies and led to a brief affiliation with Swisha House. During this time, she opened shows for various major label recording artists, including Fergie, Paul Wall, Akon, Too $hort, Afroman, and Nappy Roots.

McLean's relationship with her boyfriend turned violent in 2008, leading to an armed standoff with police after which he was incarcerated and McLean fled to Seattle to hide out with friends, leaving her daughter with her mother in Tulsa and during which time she stopped writing and recording music.

=== 2010-2011: Rise to fame ===
McLean would resurface in 2010 on the pop/rock single "Spain" with producer Mark Bryan, which received modest radio play in various markets.

After parting ways with Bryan, McLean recorded and uploaded the viral video "White Girl Raps Fast" in June 2011, which became an instant hit, generating millions of views on YouTube and WorldStarHipHop.

McLean was brought to the attention of German-American digital imprint Block Starz Music by a fan who submitted her video to the music company's website. "Honestly, we we're expecting it to be nonsense," said Peppy Johnson, Block Starz Vice President of A&R. "But from the moment she started rapping, her skill and talent level were undeniable. We believe, with a strong team around her, she has enormous commercial potential." She announced her official signing to the label September 1, 2011 during a live Ustream interview and performance on Zedalza New York.

In a statement released through her label in December 2011, Lega-C confirmed the existence of a pornographic home video and pictures taken by her abusive ex-boyfriend.

=== 2012: Off My Medication ===
Lega-C's debut album on Block Starz Music, titled Off My Medication, was released October 31, 2012. The first music video from Off My Medication, "That Bitch", debuted online October 22 as a street release to the official radio single, "Speaking Sublimely", which features Wrekonize of Strange Music’s acclaimed rap/rock band ¡Mayday!. Reviews for the album have been positive, with critics declaring, "the Tulsa Twista is more than a one trick pony" and the release as "a collection of defiant grit anthems that exhibit how Lega-C continues to prove that looks can be deceiving". The album's sound has been praised as, "real rap; kinda West-Coastish from the late 90s but definitely 2012. Hard beats and a sleek, clean lyrical flow." One day after the digital release of Off My Medication, it was announced that a CD version of the album would be distributed nationally by Select-O-Hits.

=== 2013: 18 Months ===
After the release of Off My Medication, Lega-C opted to depart from Block Starz Music and reinstate herself as an independent artist. With this move Lega-C returned to her roots and recorded the mix tape; "18 Months". On the mixtape, Lega-C remixed classic hip hop anthems from artists such as Bun B, DJ Quik, and Pharcyde as well as a remix of the alternative rock legend Nirvana's classic Teen Spirit. "18 Months" was released for free download exclusively on DatPiff in June 2013.

== Discography ==
- 2006: Album | Underestimated
- 2010: Single | Spain with Mark Bryan
- 2011: Album | Better Late Than Never
- 2011: Single | White Girl Raps Fast
- 2011: Single | Who Got Tha Heater
- 2012: Single | F**k Em All
- 2012: Album | Off My Medication
- 2013: Album | 18 Months
