= My Nappy Roots: A Journey Through Black Hair-itage =

2006 documentary film by Regina Kimbell

- Directed by: Regina Kimbell; Jay Bluemke
- Written by: Brighton Kimbell; Jay Bluemke; Regina kimbell
- Produced by: Regina Kimbell
- Starring: Cherrell; Kim Fields; Vivica A. Fox; Ed Gardner; Gary Gardner; Lalah Hathaway; Ella Joyce; Ananda Lewis; Tre Major; Elise Neal; Jeff Redd; Malcolm-Jamal Warner
- Cinematography: Regina Kimbell
- Edited by: Jay Bluemke
- Release date: 2006
- Running time: 78 minutes
- Country: United States
- Language: English

My Nappy Roots: A Journey Through Black Hair-itage is a 2006 American documentary film directed by Regina Kimbell.

== Overview ==
The film explores the politics and history of African American hair and how the European ideal of beauty influenced black hair through modern history. It details the political and cultural influences that have dominated dialogue surrounding African and African American hairstyles from styling patterns and cultural trends to the business of black hair care industry.

== Good Hair lawsuit ==
On October 5, 2009, Kimbell filed a lawsuit in a Los Angeles court against Chris Rock Productions, HBO Films, and his 2009 documentary Good Hair, as well as the film's American and international distributors. Kimbell charged that Rock's film was an illegal infringement of My Nappy Roots, which she claims to have screened for Rock before its release. While Kimbell sought to stop the wide release of Good Hair, a federal judge allowed Rock's film to be released as scheduled.

== See also ==
- Good Hair (2009 documentary)
- No Lye: An American Beauty Story (2019 documentary)
