= Olivia Galli =

American social media influencer

- Born: 1998 (age 27–28); Chicago, Illinois, U.S.
- Education: Parsons School of Design
- Occupation: Social media influencer
- Relatives: George E. Johnson (grandfather)

TikTok information
- Page: Olivia Joan
- Years active: 2021–present
- Followers: 306 thousand
- Last updated: August 11, 2026

Olivia Joan Galli (born 1998) is an American social media influencer. She is best known for her fashion and lifestyle videos on TikTok.

== Life and career ==
Galli was born in Chicago, Illinois, and was raised in Buenos Aires. Her father is from Argentina, and she was the granddaughter of George, a businessman, and Joan Johnson, a business executive. At the age of five, she emigrated to the United States. She briefly attended the School of the Art Institute of Chicago, before transferring to the Parsons School of Design, graduating in 2020.

Galli created her TikTok account in 2020, posting her first video on March 19, 2020. She then posted fashion and lifestyle videos, where she modeled her grandmother's wardrobe in her videos; admiring her grandmother's lifestyle, and gaining popularity and positive comments. Aside from her social media career, she is a photographer.

== Personal life ==
According to The New York Times, Galli resides in Manhattan, New York.
