= Jeremiah Hamilton =

American broker (1806/07–1875)

- Born: 1806 or 1807
- Died: May 19, 1875 (aged 67–69)
- Occupation: Broker
- Spouse: Eliza Jane Hamilton (née Morris)

Jeremiah G. Hamilton (sometimes Jerry Hamilton; died May 19, 1875) was a Wall Street broker noted as "the only black millionaire in New York" by James McCune Smith about a decade before the American Civil War.

== Career ==
Hamilton was a shrewd financial agent, amassing a fortune of $2 million ($250,000,000 in 2018 dollars) by the time of his death in 1875. Although he was the subject of much newspaper coverage and his life provides a unique perspective on race in 19th century America, Hamilton is virtually absent from modern historical literature.

Hamilton first came to prominence in 1828 after hiding out in a fishing boat for multiple days in the Port-au-Prince harbor in Haiti and eventually escaping the Haitian authorities. They had discovered he was transporting counterfeit coins to Haiti reportedly for a group of New York merchants; in absentia he was sentenced to be shot. The ship he had chartered, the Ann Eliza Jane, was confiscated by the port officials; Hamilton claimed he had escaped with $5000 of the counterfeit coin.

Almost a decade later, after the 1835 Great Fire of New York destroyed most of the buildings on the southeast tip of Manhattan, Hamilton accrued about $5 million in 2013 dollars by "taking pitiless advantage of several of the fire victims' misfortunes". His business practices were controversial; where most black entrepreneurs sold their goods to other blacks, "Hamilton cut a swath through the lily-white New York business world of the mid-1830s, a domain where his depredations soon earned him the nickname of "The Prince of Darkness". Soon thereafter, he used about $7 million to buy up a substantial amount of land and property in modern-day Astoria and Poughkeepsie. Hamilton would go on to clash with Cornelius Vanderbilt, the famous American industrialist, over control of the Accessory Transit Company.

Although he circulated among the financial elite and was himself very wealthy (he amassed a 2018 equivalent fortune of around $250 million), Hamilton was also a victim of the racism against African-Americans so pervasive during his time. During the New York City draft riots in 1863, white men seeking to lynch Hamilton broke into his house, but were turned away with only liquor, cigars, and an old suit by his wife Eliza after she said her husband was not home. Eliza Hamilton was white which made her marriage to Jeremiah taboo for the time.

At the time of his death in May 1875, Jeremiah Hamilton was said by obituaries to be the richest black man in the United States. He is buried in his family lot in the Green-Wood Cemetery in Brooklyn.

There is no known surviving image of Jeremiah Hamilton. As biographer Shane White has reasoned, Hamilton "almost certainly did have photographs taken, and quite likely commissioned a painting, but if any likenesses have survived they are probably catalogued under ‘miscellaneous’ or as ‘subject unknown'."

== Legacy ==
- The 2015 biography "Prince of Darkness" by Shane White chronicles the life of Jeremiah G. Hamilton. This book is being used as the basis for an HBO Max mini series by actor producer Don Cheadle.
- Hamilton is featured in the documentary series Profiles of African-American Success.
- February 28, 2019, U.S. Representative Jerrold Nadler entered the life of Jeremiah G. Hamilton into the Congressional Record as an Extension of Remarks.
