= Homer B. Roberts =

American Black businessman and officer (1888–1952)

- Born: 1885; Springfield, Missouri, U.S.
- Died: 1952 (aged 66–67); Chicago, Illinois, U.S.
- Military career
- Allegiance: United States of America
- Branch: United States Army
- Rank: Lieutenant
- Unit: United States Army Signal Corps
- Conflicts: World War I
- Other work: Retail auto salesman, first black auto dealer in the United States

Homer B. Roberts (1885–1952) was a graduate of Kansas State Agricultural College and veteran of World War I who was the first black man to attain the rank of lieutenant in the United States Army Signal Corps. He began his auto business by placing ads in the local paper advertising used cars. By the end of 1919, Roberts had negotiated over 60 car sales exclusively for African-American buyers. He hired two salesmen to work his lot, offered auto insurance and payment terms to customers, and later founded Roberts Motors, the first African-American owned car dealership in the United States.

== Career ==
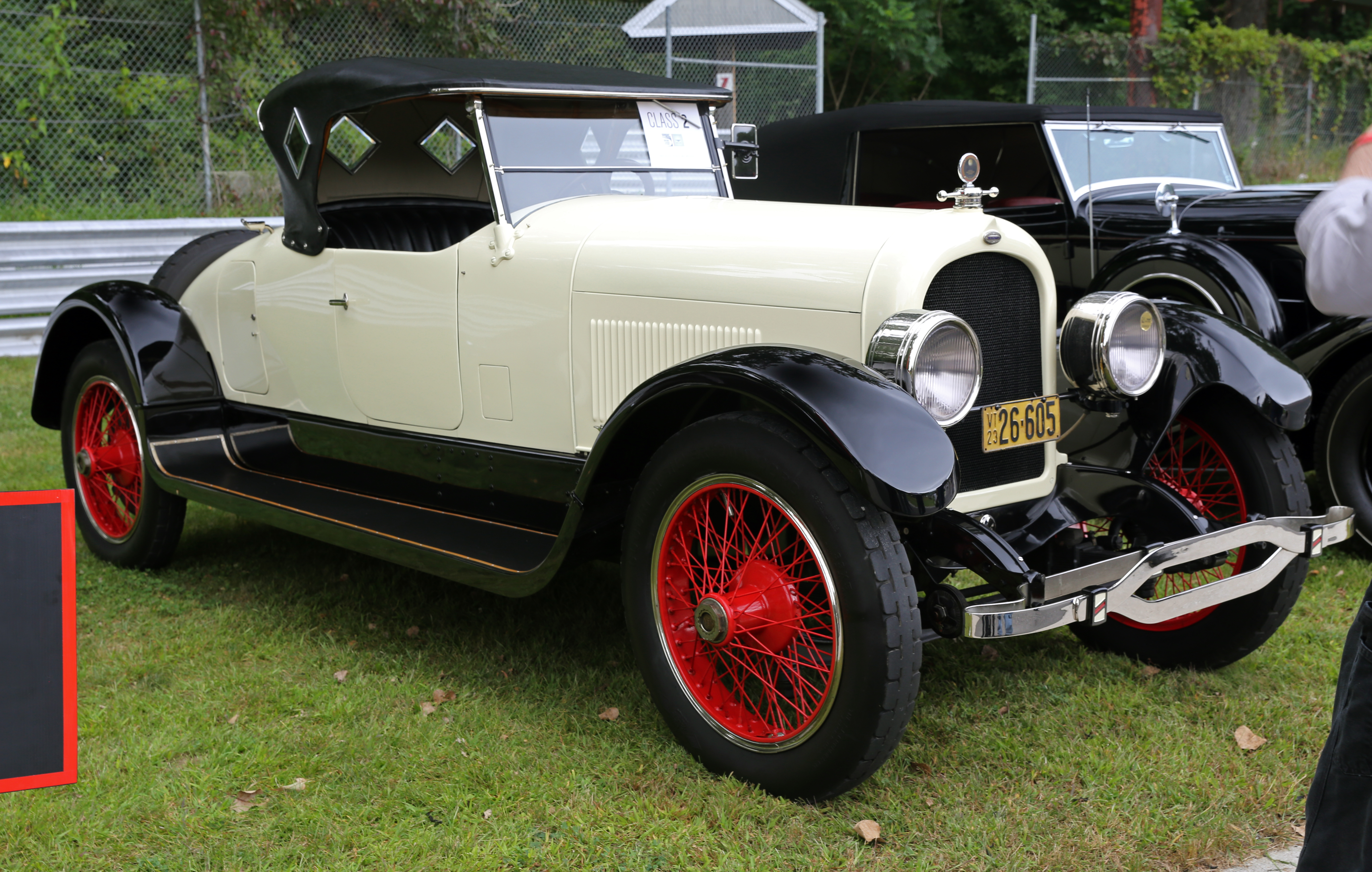
Late (1923) Marmon 34B 2-passenger Speedster

Roberts understood the power of advertising, targeting ads in The Kansas City Sun, the prominent local African-American newspaper. His 'cutting edge' advertisements were quickly responded to by the black community and his business prospered. By 1921, he had acquired offices and showrooms, hired two salesmen and increased sales to meet the growing business.

=== Dealerships ===
With his success at capturing the negro market, many small, niche auto manufacturers entered into sales agreements with Roberts. Smaller companies like Hupmobile, Rickenbacker, Whippet, and Marmon saw potential in the negro market and also backed his business, landing him franchises by Hupmobile in 1923 and by Rickenbacker in 1925. He had also signed a local Oldsmobile dealer to a distributorship arrangement in 1923 that bore fruit under the Oldsmobile banner. This also helped Roberts to land a Ford franchise that grew to feature an auto repair shop, a parts store, and a 60-car showroom. By 1925, his dealership, Roberts Co. Motor Mart, was ranked third in the United States for its sales of the Rickenbacker automobile. A new facility, when completed would offer painting, tires, repairs, accessories, upholstering, batteries, and a filling station.

=== Roberts Co. Motor Mart. ===
July 29, 1923 the formal opening of the new building named Roberts Company Motor Mart. was attended by over 3000 people and later that year the Roberts Company was selling brand new Oldsmobiles, an auto made in Detroit by General Motors. 1924 saw the Roberts company as an Oldsmobile dealer which sold hundreds Of Oldsmobile 6's. It included a 1,750-square-foot showroom, offices and service areas along with space to store and display 60 vehicles. At its peak, the business employed 55 blacks in the various endeavors. Later he opened a second dealership in Chicago. He advertised daily in The Kansas City Call, the largest African-American newspaper in Kansas City. During this period he was a broker for 15 white dealers in the Kansas City area who preferred not to have blacks mingling with their other customers in their showrooms. He then partnered with 2 black businessmen in Kansas City and a Hupmobile dealership under Thomas 'Big Piney' Brown remained at this location until 1929.

In 1928, Roberts and the other businessman, Kenneth Campbell Jr., moved to Chicago and in 1929 opened a second Hupmobile dealership, located at the Hotel Grand on South Parkway. It was the second black-owned automobile dealership in America. Both the Kansas City and Chicago dealerships were named Roberts-Campbell Motors Inc. 'Big Piney' Brown managed the Kansas City dealership until it closed in 1929. Due to the depression and the failure of the Chicago showrooms, Roberts subsequently let the Kansas City showroom falter, eventually closing the operation. By then, Hupmobile had appointed Harry Williams, a black, as a replacement in 1930, but little else about the dealership is available, it was closed shortly thereafter. Today, the Roberts Motor Mart still has a dealership operating in Kansas City.

After the closing of his dealerships, Roberts worked as a salesman for local white dealers who wanted to appeal to black customers.

== Legacy ==
- The Kansas City Automotive Museum honors this pioneer with the Homer B. Roberts showroom which showcases automobiles from the era.
- Roberts is featured on the documentary series Profiles of African-American Success.

== See also ==
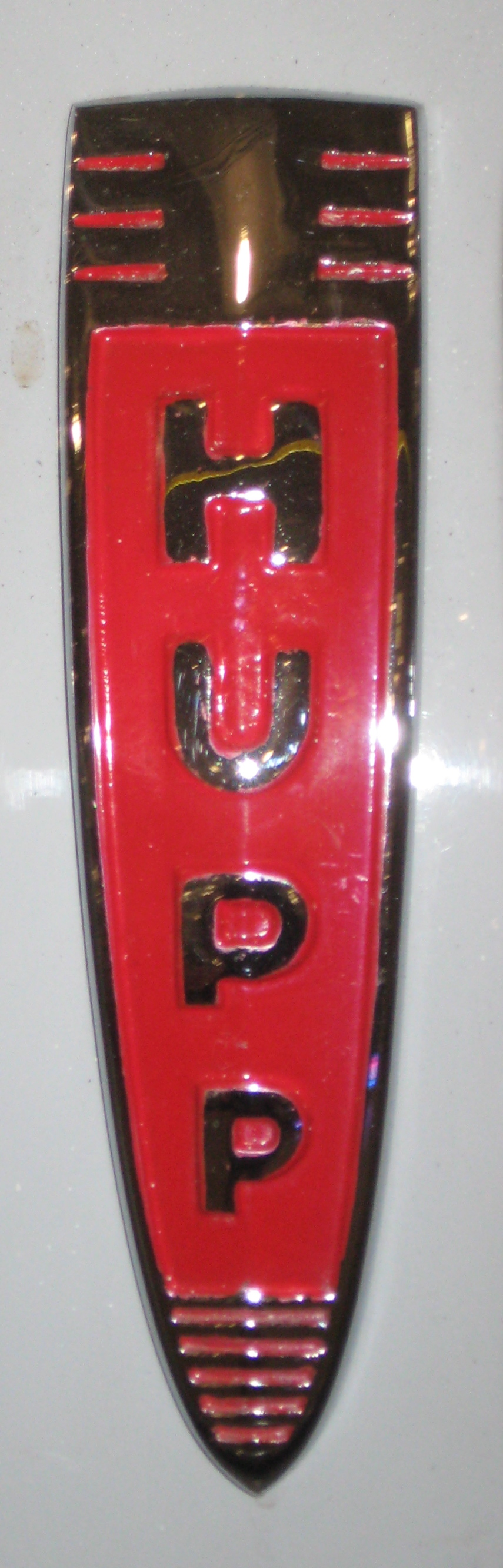
Hupp grille badge, on a 1941 Skylark

- List of African-American firsts
- Marmon Motor Car Company
- Evanair-Conditioner
- Greyhound Lines A 7-passenger Hupmobile was the first Greyhound vehicle.
- National Football League First meeting was held in a Hupmobile showroom in Canton, Ohio
- List of automobile manufacturers
- Frederick Patterson
- Eddie Rickenbacker
- Edward Davis (car dealer)
- Sarah Rector
