= Joe Dudley =

American businessman (1937–2024)

Joe Louis Dudley Sr. (May 9, 1937 – February 8, 2024) was an American businessman and hair-care entrepreneur. He was the president and chief executive officer for Dudley Products Inc., a manufacturer and distributor of hair and skin care products for the African American community.

== Life and career ==
Joe Louis Dudley Sr. was born in Aurora, North Carolina, the fifth of 11 children. When he was in the first grade, he was mistakenly labeled as being intellectually disabled because of a speech impediment. He had twice been held back by the time he reached the eleventh grade. However, Dudley persevered in his education, eventually gaining a Bachelor of Science Degree in Business Administration from North Carolina Agricultural and Technical State University in Greensboro, North Carolina.

In 1957, Dudley was living in Brooklyn, New York. He invested $10 in a Fuller Products sales kit in 1957, and began selling hair care products door to door in African American neighborhoods. In 1960 he met Eunice Mosley, who was also selling Fuller products on a door-to-door basis. They married the following year.

The Dudleys settled in Greensboro, where they opened a Fuller distributorship. When there was a shortage of Fuller products in 1969, they began manufacturing and selling their own line under the Dudley Products label. Unlike many hair and skin care providers, Dudley chose to market his product line directly to salons rather than to retailers.

At the request of company founder S.B. Fuller, Dudley moved to Chicago, Illinois, and took over Fuller Products in 1976. They consolidated the company with their operations in 1980, keeping the Dudley Products brand name. Dudley moved the company back to Greensboro in 1984. As of December 2003, with annual revenues of $30 million, the company offers 400 hair and skin care products. It also operates the Dudley Cosmetology University, with locations in North Carolina and two schools in Zimbabwe.

Dudley and his company were featured in Chris Rock's 2009 documentary Good Hair; the company is one of only a handful of African-American-owned companies manufacturing hair products for the African-American community.

Joe Dudley died on February 8, 2024, at the age of 86.
