= Samuel B. Fuller =

American businessman (1905–1988)

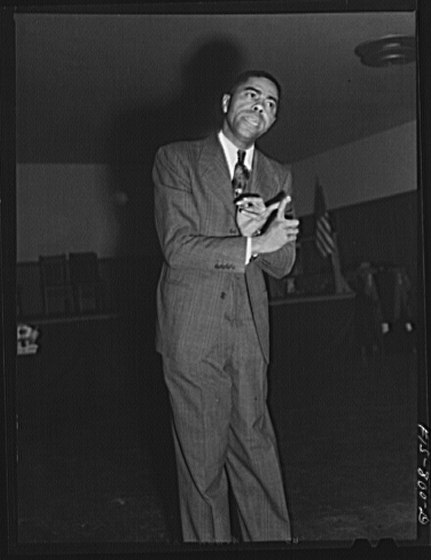
Mr. S. B. Fuller, president of the Fuller Products Corporation and chairman of the Negro Chamber of Commerce addressing a meeting of the forum in Chicago, Illinois at the Ida B. Wells Housing Project

S. B. Fuller (June 4, 1905 – October 24, 1988) was an American entrepreneur. He was founder and president of the Fuller Products Company, publisher of the New York Age and Pittsburgh Courier, head of the South Side Chicago NAACP, president of the National Negro Business League, and a prominent black Republican.

S. B. Fuller's life was an illustration of business success and self-help. His company gave inspiration and training to countless aspiring entrepreneurs and future leaders, including John H. Johnson of Johnson Publishing, George Ellis Johnson founder of Johnson Products, and Dr. T. R. M. Howard. Joe L. Dudley Senior of Greensboro, North Carolina had a similar business, the Dudley Products Company, which was a major distributor of Fuller products and also offered products of its own and kept the Fuller Products name alive after the end of S. B. Fuller's career.

== Early life ==
Fuller (no relation to Alfred C. Fuller, founder of the Fuller Brush Company) was born into rural poverty to a sharecropper family in Monroe, Ouachita Parish, Louisiana in 1905. The family's poverty was such that he had to drop out of school in sixth grade. At nine he was selling products door-to-door and gaining experience as an entrepreneur. At fifteen his family moved to Memphis, Tennessee. Two years later his mother would pass away leaving seven children to fend for themselves. In an interview (U.S. News World Report – August 19, 1963 ) he spoke of this time " ...the Relief people came and offered us some relief, but we did not accept it because it was a shame in those days for people to receive relief. We did not want our neighbors to think we couldn't make for ourselves. So we youngsters made it for ourselves. "

After going to Chicago in 1928, Fuller worked in a wide range of menial jobs, eventually rising to become manager of a coal yard. Subsequent to his employment in the coal yard, he gained employment as an insurance representative for Commonwealth Burial Association, an African-American firm. Although he had a secure job during the Depression, he nevertheless struck out on his own preferring "freedom" to "security."

== Entrepreneurship ==
His career as an entrepreneur started after he borrowed twenty-five dollars using his car as collateral. Along with his friend Lestine Thornton (who later became his wife), he invested in a load of soap from Boyer International Laboratories, manufacturer of Jean Nadal Cosmetics and HA Hair Arranger. His success selling soap door-to-door inspired him to invest another $1000. He incorporated Fuller Products in 1929. In four years he would be promoted to a manager at Commonwealth while continuing to grow his own company to a line of 30 products and hiring additional door-to-door salespeople.

The substantial number of African American families who moved to the South side of Chicago during the Great Migration became the customer base from which Fuller Products would see tremendous expansion. The additional growth was sufficient for the company to open its own factory in 1939. In 1947, Fuller purchased Boyer to prevent its bankruptcy, keeping his ownership a secret. The company began to manufacture and sell a diverse line of commodities from deodorant and hair care to hosiery and men's suits. Fuller also purchased several newspapers including the New York Age and the Pittsburgh Courier. Additionally, he owned the South Center Department Store and the Regal Theater in Chicago.

== Politics ==
Fuller was a leading black Republican although he always had an independent streak. He promoted civil rights and briefly headed the Chicago South Side NAACP. Along with Birmingham businessman, A. G. Gaston, he tried to organize a cooperative effort to purchase the segregated bus company during the Montgomery bus boycott. He told Martin Luther King Jr., "The bus company is losing money and willing to sell. We should buy it." King was skeptical of the idea, and not enough African American people came forward to raise the money.

Despite his belief in civil rights, Fuller's emphasis was always on the need for African American people to go into business. In 1958, he blasted the federal government for undermining free enterprise and fostering socialism. He feared that it was "doing the same thing today as was done in the days of Caesar—destroying incentive and initiative." He argued that wherever "there is capitalism there is freedom."

Fuller was a good friend and associate of Dr. T. R. M. Howard, of Mound Bayou, Mississippi and later Chicago. Howard was a wealthy black entrepreneur and a prominent civil rights leader and mentor to Medgar Evers. Fuller and Howard had probably met because of their mutual involvement in the National Negro Business League. Fuller was president of the organization for several terms in the 1940s and 1950s. He hired Howard to be medical director of Fuller Products and supported his Republican campaign for Congress in 1958.

== Change of fortune ==
During the 1950s, Fuller was probably the richest African American man in the United States. His cosmetics company had $18 million in sales and a sales force of five thousand (one-third of them white). It gave training to many future entrepreneurs and other leaders. "It doesn't make any difference," he declared, "about the color of an individual's skin. No one cares whether a cow is black, red, yellow, or brown. They want to know how much milk it can produce."

Despite his opinion, the White Citizens Councils organized a boycott of Fuller's Nadal products line during the 1950s, when they learned an African American owned the company. This would be the beginning of a turn of fortune for Fuller's business interests that would affect his activities throughout the 1960s.

In 1963 Fuller was the first African American inducted into the National Association of Manufacturers. During his acceptance speech he stated that "a lack of understanding of the capitalist system and not racial barriers was keeping blacks from making progress." In an interview that same year with U.S. News & World Report he said, "Negroes are not discriminated against because of the color of their skin. They are discriminated against because they have not anything to offer that people want to buy." Afterwards his company suffered severe setbacks as many of his comments were reported out of context. Major national black leaders reacted angrily and called for a boycott of Fuller Products.

In 1968, Fuller sold unregistered promissory notes in interstate commerce for which he was charged with violating the Federal Securities Act. After pleading guilty, being placed on five years' probation, and ordered to repay creditors $1.6 million, Fuller Products entered bankruptcy in 1971. Although the company reorganized, and reported profits of $300,000 in 1972, and the cosmetics portion of the old company was rebuilt, it never returned to the firm's previous levels of size or profitability.

In 1976, Fuller, as a result of health problems, asked his top distributor, Joe Dudley, to move to Chicago and become President of the Fuller Products Company. Dudley ran both Fuller Products Company and Dudley Products Company from 1976 until 1984. In 1984, Fuller Products Company was purchased by Dudley.

Fuller was eighty-three years of age when he died at St. Francis Hospital in Blue Island, Illinois from kidney failure.

== Family ==
Fuller was the father-in-law of neurologist and Canadian football hall-of-famer Tom Casey.

== See also ==
- List of African-American Republicans

== Bibliography ==
- Mary Fuller Casey, S.B. Fuller: Pioneer in Black Economic Development (Jamestown, N.C.: Bridgemaster Press, 2003).
- Beito, David and Linda (2009). Black Maverick: T.R.M. Howard's Fight for Civil Rights and Economic Power. Urbana: University of Illinois Press. ISBN 978-0-252-03420-6.
- Dittmer, John (1994). Local People: the Struggle for Civil Rights in Mississippi. Urbana: University of Illinois Press. ISBN 0-252-02102-9..
- John N. Ingham and Lynne B. Feldman, eds. African American Business Leaders: A Biographical Dictionary. Westport, CT: Greenwood Press, 1994.
- S. B. Fuller. The Scribner Encyclopedia of American Lives, Volume 2: 1986–1990. Charles Scribner's Sons, 1999.
- S. B. Fuller, Master of Enterprise: A Great Businessman Is Remembered. Issues & Views 5 (Winter 1989).
