= George E. Johnson (businessman) =

American businessman (1927–2026)

- Johnson in 2025
- Born: George Ellis Johnson; June 16, 1927; Richton, Mississippi, U.S.
- Died: July 6, 2026 (aged 99); Chicago, Illinois, U.S.
- Occupation: Businessman
- Years active: 1954–2026
- Known for: Founder of Johnson Products Company
- Spouses: Joan Henderson (m. 1950; div. 1989) (m. 1995; died 2019) Madeline Murphy Rabb (m. 2022)
- Children: 4
- Relatives: Olivia Galli (granddaughter)
- Website: johnsonproducts.com

George Ellis Johnson (June 16, 1927 – July 6, 2026) was an American businessman. He was a co-founder of Johnson Products Company, a cosmetics company headquartered in Chicago, Illinois, which created products such as Ultra Sheen and Afro Sheen. In 1971, it became the first Black-owned company listed on the American Stock Exchange.

== Early life ==
George Ellis Johnson was born in Richton, Mississippi, on June 16, 1927. When he was two years old, his parents separated and he moved to Chicago with his mother, Priscilla. Johnson began to work as a shoe shiner at the age of eight and continued to work menial jobs. After dropping out of high school in the 11th grade, Johnson became a door-to-door cosmetics salesman for the company Fuller Products, which was owned by Black cosmetics entrepreneur Samuel B. Fuller. Johnson then took a job in the laboratory at Fuller's company. During this time, he created Ultra Wave, a hair relaxer for men and one of his future company's products.

== Career ==
In 1954, with Fuller's support, Johnson founded Johnson Products Company in Chicago with his wife Joan and a barber. To fund the company, Johnson got a $250 bank loan by telling them that the money was for a vacation to California with his wife; he had previously been rejected for a business loan by another branch of the same bank, which had called the prospect "ridiculous". A hair straightener marketed to women, Ultra Sheen, was later created by modifying Ultra Wave.

During the next quarter-century more products were introduced, including Afro Sheen, one of Johnson's best-known products. In 1964, Johnson founded Independence Bank of Chicago; he was its chairman until its 1995 sale. Johnson Products became the first Black-controlled sponsor behind the nationally-syndicated television program Soul Train, which ran weekly beginning in the 1970s. The company's annual sales reached $12.6 million by 1970. In 1971, it became the first Black-owned company to be listed on the American Stock Exchange.

As part of the 1989 divorce settlement between Johnson and his wife, Johnson exited the company. Joan became chairman and principal shareholder while their son Eric G. Johnson was named chief executive. In 1993, the company was purchased by the Ivax Corporation, which ended its control by Black investors.

== Personal life and death ==
Johnson was married to Joan Betty Henderson, whom he met while they were students at high school. Johnson and Henderson wed in May 1950 and briefly divorced in 1989, but later remarried in 1995. During his divorce from Henderson, Johnson was married to Renee Derem, a French woman, from 1993 to 1995. Johnson and Henderson remarried in 1995, and remained married until her death in 2019. Together they had four children.

He married Madeline Murphy Rabb on March 30, 2022. Johnson and Philadelphia author Hilary Beard co-wrote his memoir, Afro Sheen, which was published by Little, Brown and Company in 2025. Johnson died of a respiratory illness on July 6, 2026, at the age of 99, at his condominium in Chicago.

== Awards and honors ==
Johnson was awarded nine honorary doctorates. He received the Horatio Alger Award in 1981 and the Babson Medal from Babson College in 1983.
