= Block Starz Music =

American record label

- Founded: 2008
- Founder: Bayer Mack; Kai Denninger
- Distributor: Select-O-Hits
- Genre: Various
- Country of origin: U.S.
- Location: Louisville, Kentucky; Sarasota, Florida
- Official website: blockstarztv.com

Block Starz Music is an American independent record label owned and operated by Bayer Mack. Its catalog includes independent releases by Machine Gun Kelly, Lega-C, Wiz Khalifa, Lisa "Left Eye" Lopes, Big Sean, Rhymefest, and Ceddy Bu Rap Sumo. The label also includes its subsidiaries such as the independent film and television production company Block Starz Music Television.

== History ==
=== 2008–2009: Early years ===
Block Starz Music's first official mixtape, Suburban Empire by ex-VH1 reality show star John Brown, was released in early 2009. An alumnus of Ego Trip's The White Rapper Show, XXL Magazine put Brown "in the same category as Weird Al Yankovic" and lampooned the project. The first Block Starz compilation, West Coast Block Starz, was released in early February 2009 and featured various new artists and guest appearances by Snoop Dogg, E-40, Keak da Sneak, and Daz Dillinger.

In the summer of 2009, Block Starz partnered with Atlanta-based D-Lo Entertainment to release Certified, the debut mixtape from future Love & Hip Hop: Atlanta cast member Rasheeda. The company would go on to have more success with the mixtape release What's High? by a nineteen-year-old Jewish rapper from Youngstown, OH named Throwback, who at the time had the same manager as a then unsigned Wiz Khalifa. Block Starz Music quickly signed Throwback, who had recorded two songs with Khalifa, as its first official artist and began work on East Coast Block Starz in the fall of 2009. Released on December 29 with the song "Was It" by Throwback featuring Wiz Khalifa as the lead single, East Coast Block Starz received generally favorable reviews, though critics noted it had a decidedly more commercial slant than its predecessor. In addition to "Was It", which benefited from the growing popularity of Wiz Khalifa, Boston native Supastar LT's collaboration, "I Love My City", with Kardinal Offishall and Red Cafe also became a popular-selling download from the project.

=== 2010–2011: Rise of the brand ===
As part of a grassroots marketing effort to promote its brand and scout new talent, Block Starz began co-sponsoring regional music awards, beginning in February 2010 with the 4th Annual Pittsburgh Hip-Hop Awards and later with the 3rd Annual South Carolina Music Awards held on July 10, 2010. It was also during this time that the label came across a young, unsigned Cleveland, Ohio artist named Machine Gun Kelly, who had won "Best Performer" at the Ohio Hip-Hop Awards in 2009, and signed an agreement to release the rapper's single "Alice In Wonderland" as part of its upcoming Midwest Block Starz compilation.

On March 5, 2010, Block Starz announced that Grammy Award winner Rhymefest had signed on to the Midwest Block Starz project, which by then already featured appearances by rappers Twista, Shawnna, and newcomer Big Sean. Released on May 26, the compilation spawned a minor hit with Rhymefest's radio-friendly "Say Wassup" featuring Phonte of Little Brother, but "Alice In Wonderland" would go on to become the company's best-selling single to date, with the music video winning "Best Video" at the 2010 Ohio Hip-Hop Awards.

Block Starz Music signed Topeka, Kansas rapper Mike Schpitz after his appearance on Midwest Block Starz and released his 11-track EP debut, Stanley Ipkiss: Year of the Nice Guy on August 3, 2010. Inspired by Jim Carrey's character from the 1994 box office smash The Mask, critical response to project was mixed, but the EP debuted in Amazon.com's Top 20 new Hip-Hop releases and Top 50 new Alternative releases in Germany, becoming the label's best-selling solo release to date.

In April 2011, it was widely reported that Jay-Z had outbid executives at Universal Records and Jive Records to acquire Block Starz Music.

Lega-C and Machine Gun Kelly

On September 1, 2011, the label announced the signing of Tulsa, Oklahoma rapper/singer/producer Lega-C, whose viral YouTube video, "White Girl Raps Fast", would go on to generate millions of views at various popular music and entertainment websites online. Seeking to capitalize off Lega-C's growing YouTube popularity, Block Starz Music announced the release of a video mixtape titled "Who Got Tha Heater" featuring eight freestyle remixes of popular singles by artists like Jay-Z, Lil Wayne, Drake, Kanye West, and two original songs. On December 5, 2011, in a statement released through her label, Lega-C confirmed the existence of a pornographic home video and pictures taken by an ex-boyfriend years earlier.

On November 29, 2011, Block Starz Music released "Macho Man" by Delwin Tha Krazyman, which featured the national debut of 650-pound Plaquemine, Louisiana rapper Ceddy Bu Rap Sumo. Ceddybu also collaborated with Lega-C for track "Don't F Around" featured on the CD version of the female rapper's major indie debut Off My Medication.

=== 2012: Left Eye, "Bath Salts", Off My Medication ===
On February 9, 2012, Block Starz signed 16-year-old Auburn, New York rapper and Floyd Mayweather Jr. protégé Cameron Sanders, aka Young Siege, and announced plans to feature him on East Coast Block Starz 2. On February 22, 2012, the label signed Bootleg of Flint, Michigan rap group The Dayton Family and unveiled the rapper's previously unreleased collaboration with Lisa "Left Eye" Lopes of TLC to commemorate the upcoming tenth anniversary of the pop star's death on April 25, 2002. Recorded a few months before her death, Left Eye's verse on the song "Fantasies" is the only 16-bar feature she ever recorded with another rapper.

Off My Medication cover art

Block Starz Music's newly signed satirical comedy rapper, Dickward Codgers, made national headlines in August 2012 with the release of his controversial music video, "Bath Salts", which featured what label executives deemed to be excessive drug references and graphic depictions of violence and was the company's first to carry an official disclaimer.

Lega-C's debut album on Block Starz Music, titled Off My Medication, was released October 31, 2012. The first music video from Off My Medication, "That Bitch", debuted online October 22 as a street release to the official radio single, "Speaking Sublimely", which features Wrekonize of Strange Music's acclaimed rap/rock band ¡Mayday!. Reviews for the album have been positive, with critics declaring, "the Tulsa Twista is more than a one trick pony" and the release as "a collection of defiant grit anthems that exhibit how Lega-C continues to prove that looks can be deceiving". The album's sound has been praised as, "real rap; kinda West-Coastish from the late 90s but definitely 2012. Hard beats and a sleek, clean lyrical flow." One day after the digital release of Off My Medication, it was announced that a CD version of the album would be distributed nationally by Select-O-Hits.

=== 2014 to present: Darrell Cole ===
In 2014, the label introduced Afro-Belgian rapper Darrell Cole and released the rapper's North American debut,"Swahili", the following year. On the song, Cole, who was born in London, England and raised in Sierra Leone, raps about the dual stigmatization Africans face in Europe and their homeland. In 2016, it was announced Darrell Cole had signed with Sony Music.

== Waffle House controversy ==
J.R. Bricks

Less than a week after the July 20, 2011, digital release of "Waffle House", the debut single from newly signed Block Starz Music recording artist J.R. Bricks, legal counsel for WH Capital, LLC and Waffle House, Inc., owner and licensee of the Waffle House® trademarks respectively, issued a cease and desist letter to the label claiming improper and unauthorized usage. In response, Block Starz Music changed the song's title to "After the Club". This sparked cries of racism by some in the online Hip-Hop community who saw the southern restaurant chain's move as an effort to distance itself from its, predominately black and Latino, early morning weekend customers. In a statement to Billboard, a Waffle House spokesperson denied claims of racial or cultural discrimination saying, "We embrace all cultures within Waffle House. All you have to do is come eat with us and you see that."

== Removal of CEO ==
On December 24, 2012, the label announced that its German chief executive officer, Kai Denninger, would no longer be with the company and that the label's founder and president, Bayer Mack, would take over Denninger's duties, effective immediately.

"Kai Denninger will no longer be with the company," Mack said in a brief statement posted to his personal LinkedIn profile on Christmas Eve. "Kai was instrumental in helping us build the Block Starz Music brand. He will be greatly missed and we wish him nothing but the best in all his future endeavors."

== Block Starz Music Television ==
=== Origins ===
Block Starz Music Television LLC is an American independent film and television company based in Sarasota, Florida. The studio is best known for its documentary film The Czar of Black Hollywood, as well as its leadership in developing and distributing online video and original web programming, like the documentary series Profiles of African-American Success. Block Starz Music Television was founded by independent record executive and filmmaker Bayer L. Mack as The BlockStarz.Tv Network in 2013 and organized as Block Starz Music Television LLC in 2014.

Ceddy Bu Da Rap Sumo (right) with Shaquille O'Neal, Delwin tha Krazyman

In February 2013, after arranging for Block Starz Music artist Ceddy Bu Da Rap Sumo to appear on the TruTV comedy series Upload with Shaquille O'Neal, the label announced the formation of the spinoff company The BlockStarz.Tv Network to produce an original web series around Ceddy Bu and other recording artists on the label's roster. On January 3, 2014, it was reported that Ceddy Bu (born Cedrick Smith) was killed when a car he was a passenger in ran off the road and flipped.

=== This Is Dante ===
On May 8, 2013, Block Starz Music Television co-produced "This Is Dante", a half-hour comedy web series that followed the misadventures of Bronx, NY native Dante Hillmedo (Andrew Hillmedo Jr.), an American actor, who most notably appeared in 2008's major motion picture Baby Mama starring Tina Fey and Amy Poehler, and his struggles to launch a rap career.

=== The Czar of Black Hollywood ===
Poster for the 2014 documentary film Oscar Micheaux: The Czar of Black Hollywood

The Czar of Black Hollywood is a 2014 documentary film chronicling the early life and career of African-American filmmaker Oscar Micheaux (1884–1951). Block Starz Music founder Bayer L. Mack conceived, wrote and produced the film about Micheaux using Library of Congress archived footage, photos, illustrations and vintage music. An eight-minute trailer premiered online March 31, 2014.

The documentary is narrated by William Bell, features an original score by Nicholas Jones and art direction by Julie Anderson.

On February 13, The Czar of Black Hollywood was announced by American radio host Tom Joyner on his nationally syndicated program, The Tom Joyner Morning Show, as part of its "Little Known Black History Fact" on Oscar Micheaux.

In an April 2014 interview with The Washington Times, Block Starz Music founder Bayer L. Mack said that he read the 2007 biography Oscar Micheaux: The Great and Only by Patrick McGilligan and was inspired to produce The Czar of Black Hollywood because Micheaux's life mirrored his own. In a June 2014 interview with The Huffington Post, Mack said he was shocked there "was virtually nothing out there about Micheaux's life" in spite of his historical significance.

The film's executive producer, Frances Presley Rice, told the Sun Sentinel that Micheaux was the first "indie movie producer."

Oscar Micheaux: The Czar of Black Hollywood had its official premiere on September 27, 2014, at the 99th Annual Association for the Study of African American Life and History Convention in Memphis, TN and received a Best Independent Documentary nomination from The Foundation for the Advancement of African-Americans in Film (FAAAF) at the 2015 Black Reel Awards.

== Discography ==
=== Albums ===
- BSM-1000: West Coast Block Starz – Various Artists
- BSM-1001: East Coast Block Starz – Various Artists
- BSM-1002: Midwest Block Starz – Various Artists
- BSM-1003: Top Model Super Fashion – The NUV
- BSM-1004: Stanley Ipkiss: Year of the Nice Guy – Mike Schpitz
- BSM-1005: The Ripple Effect – Ragz Mo' Rocka
- BSM-1006: She Got Next 2011 – Various Artists
- BSM-1007: Digital Money – Money First
- BSM-1008: Down South Block Starz – Various Artists
- BSM-1009: Soul: Best of the Block Vol.1 – Various Artists
- BSM-1010: The Manual Procedures – Boom Blake
- BSM-1011: Off My Medication – Lega-C

=== Singles ===
- BSM-0100: "Alice In Wonderland" – Machine Gun Kelly
- BSM-0101: "Was It" – Throwback ft. Wiz Khalifa
- BSM-0102: "Catch Me" – Barbara Kiss
- BSM-0103: "Where We Started" – Life Size Ghost
- BSM-0104: "Ima Be Okay" – Nicole Michelle
- BSM-0105: "Shoe Fetish" – Shelly B
- BSM-0106: "Thought I Had It All" – Illa Scorsese ft. Lela Bizz & Cakes
- BSM-0107: "Waffle House" – J.R. Bricks
- BSM-0108: "After The Club" – J.R. Bricks
- BSM-0109: "Got It On Lock" – Boom Blake
- BSM-0110: "White Girl Raps Fast" – Lega-C
- BSM-0111: "Who Got Tha Heater" – Lega-C
- BSM-0112: "Macho Man" – Delwin Tha Krazyman ft. Ceddy Bu & Hollyhood Bay Bay
- BSM-0113: "Fuck Em All" – Lega-C
- BSM-0114: "Fantasies" – Bootleg (of The Dayton Family) ft. Lisa "Left Eye" Lopes
- BSM-0115: "We Doin' It" – Loced Out Ent. ft. Lil Young & Tum Tum
- BSM-0116: "Wilt Chamberlain" – Boom Blake
- BSM-0117: "Bath Salts" – Dickward Codgers
- BSM-0118: "Swahili" – Darrell Cole
