= The Czar of Black Hollywood =

- Directed by: Bayer Mack
- Written by: Bayer Mack
- Produced by: Bayer Mack; Frances Presley-Rice; Hal Croasmun
- Starring: Oscar Micheaux
- Narrated by: William Bell
- Edited by: Bayer Mack; Edith Bush
- Music by: Nicholas Jones
- Distributed by: Block Starz Music Television
- Release dates: September 26, 2014 (ASALH Film Festival); October 17, 2014
- Running time: 67 minutes
- Country: United States
- Language: English

The Czar of Black Hollywood is a 2014 documentary film by Bayer Mack that chronicles the early life and career of African-American filmmaker Oscar Micheaux (1884–1951). Mack conceived of and produced the film about Micheaux using Library of Congress archived footage, photos, illustrations and vintage music. The documentary, which is the first devoted exclusively to Oscar Micheaux's life, is narrated by William Bell, features an original score by Nicholas Jones and art direction by Julie Anderson.

== Synopsis ==
Oscar Micheaux was America's preeminent black filmmaker for three decades, having directed or produced 22 silent movies and 15 talking pictures. The Czar of Black Hollywood chronicles the real life experiences that inspired Micheaux's films, including the production of the first feature-length film, The Homesteader (1919), and sound motion picture, The Exile (1931), by an African-American.

== Development ==
In an April 2014 interview with The Washington Times, Block Starz Music founder Bayer L. Mack said that he read the 2007 biography Oscar Micheaux: The Great and Only by Patrick McGilligan and was inspired to produce Oscar Micheaux: The Czar of Black Hollywood because Micheaux's life mirrored his own. In an interview with The News and Advance, Mack said he “scoured the archives of all the great major black weeklies” for information and imagery to recreate Micheaux's world, saying the documentary film was a "restoration project".

== Release ==
On February 13, 2014, Oscar Micheaux: The Czar of Black Hollywood was announced by American radio host Tom Joyner on his nationally syndicated program, The Tom Joyner Morning Show, as part of its "Little Known Black History Fact" on Micheaux. In a June 2014 interview with The Huffington Post, Mack said he was shocked there "was virtually nothing out there about Micheaux's life" in spite of his historical significance. A screening of Oscar Micheaux: The Czar of Black Hollywood was held at the Boca Black Film Festival on July 17 in Boca Raton, Florida. In a lead up to the event, the film's executive producer, Frances Presley Rice, told Florida's Sun Sentinel that Micheaux was the first "indie movie producer." The film had a special screening on September 26, 2014, at the 99th Annual Association for the Study of African American Life and History (ASALH) Convention in Memphis, TN and its first public screening on October 17, 2014, at the Academy of Fine Arts in Lynchburg, Virginia.

== Reception ==
The documentary was critically acclaimed upon release and remains popular with film historians. Fans of African-American cinema often screen The Czar of Black Hollywood along with one of Oscar Micheaux's movies. The film has aired on public television and is available at several libraries in North America. The Czar of Black Hollywood was one of four feature films selected to be screened and discussed at the 2020 March on Washington Film Festival, which finds, encourages, and brings to life stories of both icons and foot soldiers from the Civil Rights Movement.

== Cast ==
- Oscar Micheaux: Himself (archive footage)
- William Bell: Narrator
- Nicholas Jones: Oscar Micheaux (voice)
- M. Ayodele Heath: Claude McKay (voice)
