= David J. Steiner =

American filmmaker

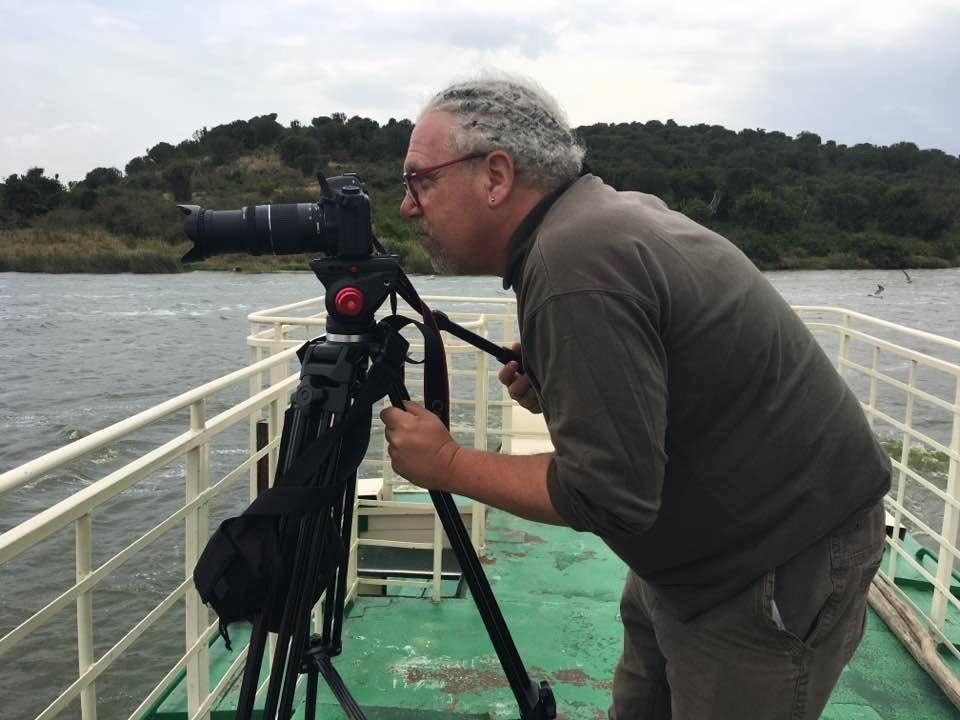
- Born: David Jay Steiner; February 2, 1965; Chicago, Illinois, United States
- Died: December 26, 2016 (aged 51); Iganga, Uganda
- Education: UCLA, National Louis University
- Occupations: Film director, film producer, educator, political activist, rabbi, real estate investor, mediator

David J. Steiner (February 2, 1965 – December 26, 2016) was an American documentary filmmaker, educator, rabbi, real estate investor, mediator and political activist, best known for the documentary film Saving Barbara Sizemore (2016).

== Early life ==
David Jay Steiner was born in Chicago, Illinois to a Jewish family, and was raised in nearby Lincolnwood, Illinois. His parents, Robinn Schulman, a nurse whose family owned the company that manufactured Shane Toothpaste (now known as AloeSense), and Joseph Steiner, a figurative painter and art instructor, divorced when he was young, but maintained an amicable relationship. As a youth, he began a lifelong affiliation with Habonim Dror, the labor Zionist youth movement.

== Education ==
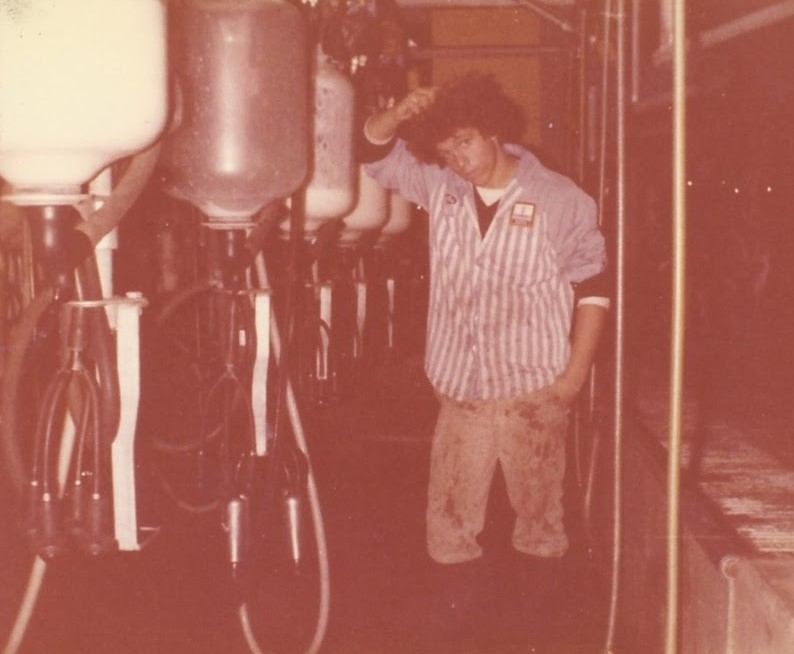
Steiner at the Hakfar Hayarok dairy (circa 1982)

Steiner was educated in Lincolnwood, Illinois area public schools until his sophomore year of high school, when unaccompanied by his family, he moved to Israel. In accord with his socialist values, he lived in the kibbutz community of Hakfar Hayarok. On the kibbutz, Steiner was assigned to the dairy, and was put in charge of the artificial insemination and midwifery process for cows. For the rest of his life, Steiner would incorporate bovine imagery into his work; he really loved cows. Steiner served in the Israel Defense Forces and fought in the 1982 Lebanon conflict.

Steiner attended the University of Illinois-Chicago (UIC), and then the University of California Los Angeles (UCLA) where he studied film, and, taking after his father, painting. As a painter, he was devoted to the styles of expressionist painters such as Alice Neel and Ernst Ludwig Kirchner, as well as his father. He continued and further developed his political activism while living in Los Angeles and as a film student, took the actor and political activist Edward Asner as his mentor.

Steiner learned his style of filmmaking in film school at UCLA.

Steiner was drawn to film and comedy. He was strongly influenced by the comic tradition of Jews in America—the Marx Brothers, borscht belt stand-up comedians, Woody Allen and Lenny Bruce, to name a few. Of all things, Steiner was a non-conformist and an experimental visionary, like another one of his heroes, Frank Zappa. These influences would influence Steiner's later work—both his cinematic work and his writings.

As and adult and well in his late 40s, Steiner completed his doctorate in education at the National Louis University in Skokie, Illinois. Steiner undertook rabbinical studies at the Shalom Hartman Institute, the Hebrew Seminary of the Deaf and the International Institute for Secular Humanistic Judaism. On November 7, 2017, he was posthumously ordained a rabbi by the International Institute for Secular Humanistic Judaism at a ceremony in Farmington Hills, Michigan.

== Career ==
After earning his art degree at UCLA, Steiner returned to Chicago and soon thereafter moved back to Israel, where he married and had three children. He continued his creative efforts in Israel, developing CD-ROM and video content for a multimedia company, Hed Arzi Music, and teaching. Steiner strongly believed that the best way to resolve the Israeli–Palestinian conflict was to find ways to get Israeli and Palestinian youth together to create art, play sports and have constructive dialog, so he started an organization that brought together Israeli and Palestinian youth. It was at this time that Steiner's son befriended some refugees from South Sudan, which formed the inspiration for the documentary Steiner was working on at the time of his death in Africa in 2016.

Upon his return from Israel, Steiner and his family settled in Skokie, Illinois, where Steiner tackled many projects simultaneously. He created educational software products, and invested in residential real estate. Several of his properties were located in the Humboldt Park neighborhood of Chicago, where Steiner started a book club for homeless individuals in that area. During this time, Steiner also served as director of the religious school at Congregation Solel in Highland Park, Illinois, and completed his doctoral degree in education at National Louis University. Steiner also wrote a number of screenplays at this time.

However, becoming a rabbi was important to Steiner, and he was given the opportunity to study at the Shalom Hartman Institute in Jerusalem, so the family returned to Israel. The return was short-lived, as the economic crisis of 2008–2009 resulted in the reduction of the endowment upon which Steiner's rabbinical program was funded. So the Steiners returned to the United States, this time to Tarzana, California, where Steiner assumed the position of director of education at Valley Beth Shalom in Encino, California.

After a year in California, Steiner returned to Chicago, as his marriage ended in divorce. Soon after though, he met Diane Kliebard Silverberg, an attorney. Coincidentally, Silverberg was the daughter of Herbert Kliebard, a noted historian of education at the University of Wisconsin, who was a great influence on Steiner's academic work in the education field. Silverberg and Steiner eventually became engaged, and together, the two traveled to a number of faraway locations where Steiner was invited to speak and lecture, including Hong Kong. The two also traveled together to Israel, Morocco, Spain, Canada, Cuba, and the United Kingdom. He also gave lectures in Bosnia-Herzegovina. During this time, Steiner resumed his rabbinical studies at the International Institute for Secular Humanistic Judaism, as well as extensive training as a mediator. Upon completion of his mediation studies, he started Third Eye Mediation, his professional mediation practice.

While attending a mediation conference in Chicago, Steiner met Jonathan Speller, an administrator at the Barbara A. Sizemore Academy, an afrocentric charter school on the South Side of Chicago. Speller invited Steiner to the school for a Kwanzaa celebration; the school fascinated Steiner, and he decided to apply his film skills to teach children attending that school to make a documentary film. This became the basis for Saving Barbara Sizemore, Steiner's 2016 documentary.

== Film ==
=== Saving Barbara Sizemore ===
Steiner's documentary Saving Barbara Sizemore was released in the U.S. on August 27, 2016, at the Capital City Black Film Festival in Austin, Texas.

The film depicts story of the students, teachers and parents of the Barbara A. Sizemore Academy, a charter school in the Englewood area of Chicago. Barbara A. Sizemore Academy serves an African-American community which is economically disadvantaged and beset by violence. The film documents the school's unique methods, which rely heavily on African culture, customs and social structure.

In the fashion of noted documentary filmmaker Michael Moore's classic Roger and Me, Steiner takes a group of school kids to confront School District Superintendent Forrest Claypool and Chicago Mayor Rahm Emanuel about the school district's plans to shut down the school. In so doing, Steiner, who had a doctorate in education, teaches the students not only about how to operate a camera, but also how to use the power of filmmaking as a tool of political advocacy.

=== Untitled Uganda project ===
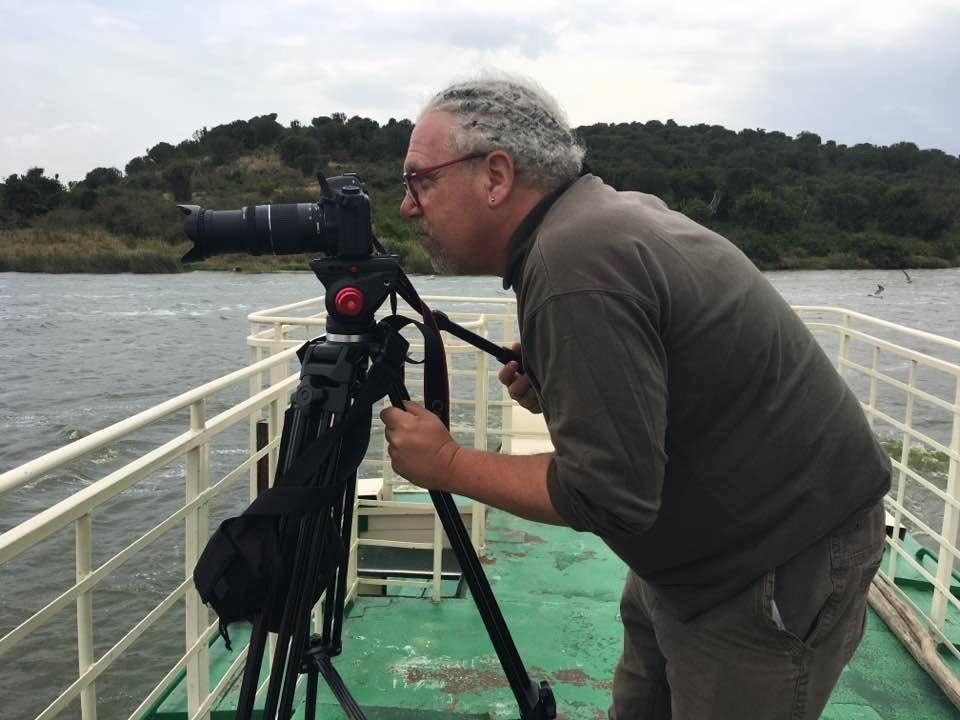
Steiner filming in Uganda (December, 2016)

In the mid-2000s, when Steiner lived in Tel Aviv with his wife and children, his young son had befriended a pair of South Sudanese boys. After Steiner returned to the United States with his family to take an administrative position as an educational director at Valley Beth Shalom in Los Angeles, he learned that these boys were being deported, part of an overall Israeli government program to deport African refugees.

This spurred Steiner to action, and he contacted his friend and UCLA film school classmate, David Bret Egen. He and Egen decided to make a documentary film about the refugee crisis, one that would incorporate the stories of his son's South Sudanese friends into a new documentary, to be filmed in the United States, Israel and Uganda, where the South Sudanese boys were living after their removal from Israel—away from their parents, who were living in war-torn Juba, South Sudan.

Steiner and Egen brought with them Sarah Giroux, a camera operator from Chicago, as well as two of the kids who helped make Saving Barbara Sizemore. In December 2016, they began production of the Uganda portion of the film. They also screened Steiner's first film at a Ugandan film festival. However on December 26, 2016, Steiner was killed in a bus accident, as their vehicle was hit at high speed by a reckless driver outside of Iganga, Uganda, after the crew attended a holiday party. The other members of the crew escaped with non-life threatening injuries. As of November 2017, with the film partially completed, the Steiner family and Egen have taken steps to continue and complete the film, as a tribute to Steiner and his legacy.

The Come True Project, an Israeli charity established to help support the education of South Sudanese refugee children living in Uganda, established the David J. Steiner Scholarships Fund in furtherance of this purpose.

== Writings and political activism ==
David Steiner was a prolific writer of articles, blog entries, screenplays, and academic writings. His blog, titled The Radish: On The Beet with David Steiner, ran for six years (2008-2014), and in it, Steiner discussed a variety of topics related to causes that where close to him—peace in the Middle East, the refugee crisis, Israeli politics, mediation, baseball, and more. The name of the blog was derived from the first letters of his name: Rabbi Doctor Shteiner. Israel was always on the forefront of Steiner's mind, and his writings reflected his advocacy for an inclusive Jewish homeland, one built on democracy, tolerance and progressive values.

Steiner was a regular contributor to eJewish Philanthropy, a resource for Jewish organizations and professionals. His articles drew upon his vast knowledge of Jewish history, philosophy and liturgy, as well as popular culture and contemporary themes and issues.

Steiner was an early supporter of Barack Obama, and in February 2007, traveled to Springfield, Illinois in freezing cold weather to watch Obama declare for the presidency at an outdoor event. In the 2016 election cycle, he strongly supported Senator Bernie Sanders' presidential campaign. Near the end of his life, Steiner also actively supported protests related to police brutality, more particularly those related to police-involved shootings of unarmed African-Americans.

Among those who noted the passing of Steiner in December 2016, was Ameinu, the progressive Zionist organization, whose leadership lauded Steiner for "providing thoughtful writings and event programs that fused Jewish scholarship, Israel education and social justice engagement."

In 2017, the Barbara A. Sizemore Academy renamed their media studies center the "David J. Steiner Digital Media Department", in honor of the man whose film helped save their school. As another posthumous honor, the Chicago chapter of the Center for Conflict Resolution named its annual David Steiner Dedicated Volunteer Award after Steiner, acknowledging that the over 200 disputes he mediated in just two years is a record that likely will never be broken—or indeed, even approached.

== Personal life ==
Steiner had a son and two daughters from a previous marriage. At the time of his death, Steiner was engaged to Diane Silverberg, and the two were living together in Evanston, Illinois. Steiner is buried at Memorial Park Cemetery in Skokie, Illinois. On June 6, 2018, Steiner's son Itamar was selected by the Chicago Cubs in the 40th round of the 2018 Major League Baseball draft.

== Filmography ==
Year	Film	Role	Notes
2016	Saving Barbara Sizemore	Self	Director, Producer: Chicago
