= The Struggle for the American Curriculum =

1986 history book by Herbert Kliebard

- Author: Herbert Kliebard
- Subject: History of education in the United States
- Publisher: Routledge & Kegan Paul
- Publication date: 1986
- Pages: 300

The Struggle for the American Curriculum, 1893–1958, is a book written by historian of education Herbert Kliebard and published by Routledge & Kegan Paul in 1986.

== Bibliography ==
- Cowen, Robert (1988). "Review of The Struggle for the American Curriculum, 1893-1958; Power and the Promise of School Reform: Grassroots Movements during the Progressive Era; Opportunity in Adversity: How Colleges Can Succeed in Hard Times". Comparative Education. 24 (1): 148–149. ISSN 0305-0068. JSTOR 3518909.
- Mallinson, Vernon (1987). "Review of The Struggle for the American Curriculum (1893-1958)". British Journal of Educational Studies. 35 (2): 181–182. doi:10.2307/3121451. ISSN 0007-1005. JSTOR 3121451.
- McLean, Martin (1991). "Review of The Struggle for the American Curriculum 1893-1958". European Journal of Education. 26 (1): 90–91. doi:10.2307/1502875. ISSN 0141-8211. JSTOR 1502875.
- Peterson, Paul E. (1987). "Review of The Struggle for the American Curriculum, 1893-1958". Academe. 73 (2): 86. doi:10.2307/40249883. ISSN 0190-2946. JSTOR 40249883.
- Useem, Elizabeth (1987). "Review of The Struggle for the American Curriculum: 1893-1958". Contemporary Sociology. 16 (6): 895–896. doi:10.2307/2071630. ISSN 0094-3061. JSTOR 2071630.
- Walker, Decker F. (1987). "Review of The Struggle for the American Curriculum, 1893-1958". American Journal of Education. 95 (3): 495–498. ISSN 0195-6744. JSTOR 1209244.
