= HaKfar HaYarok =

Youth village in central Israel

HaKfar HaYarok - Levi Eshkol Green Village
- הכפר הירוק
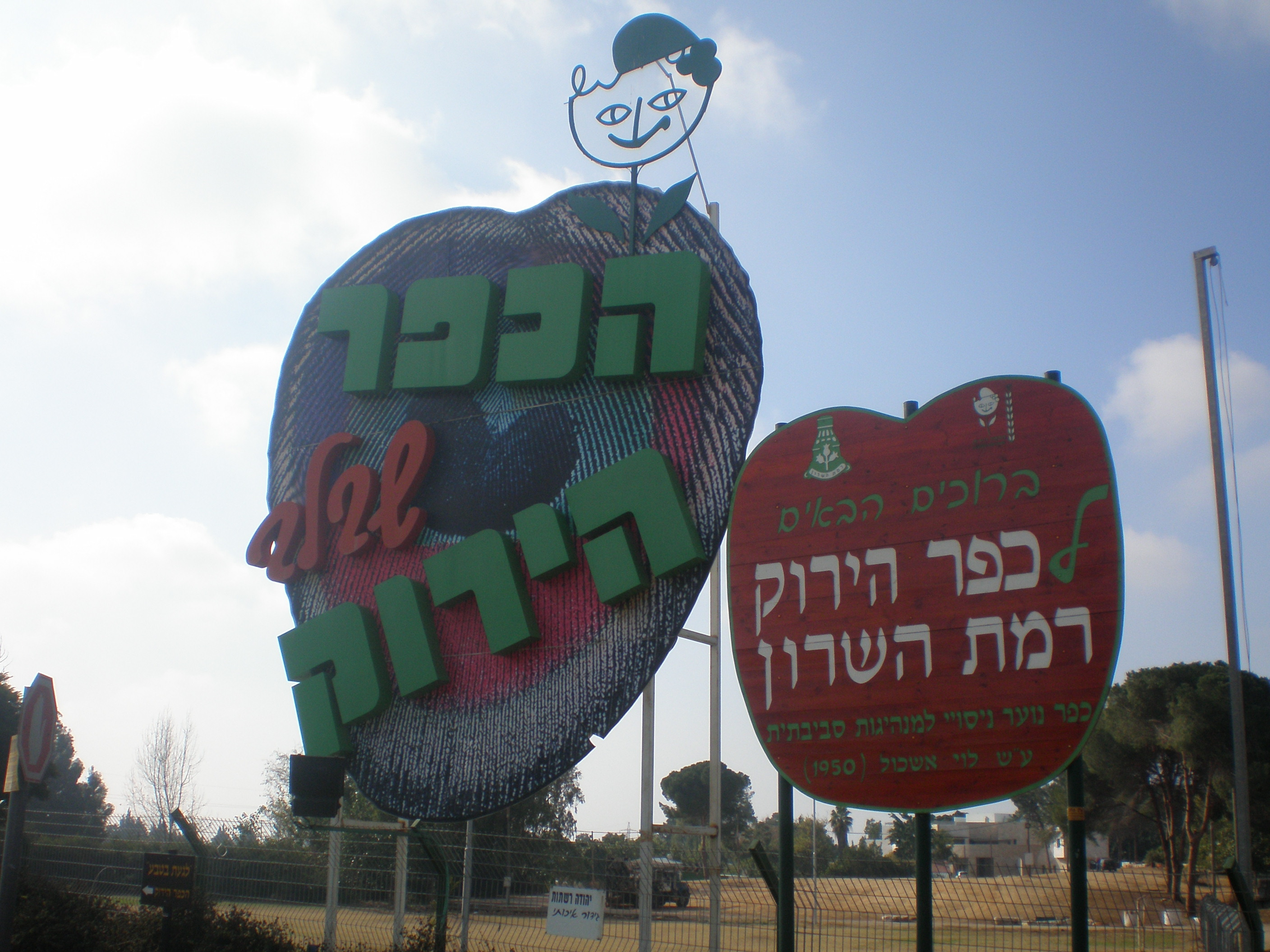
- Entrance to HaKfar HaYarok

Location
- Southern Ramat HaSharon; Ramat HaSharon; Israel; 32°8′0.55″N 34°49′45.02″E

Information
- School type: Youth Village
- Established: 1950; 76 years ago
- Founder: Gershon Zak
- Age range: 12–20
- Enrollment: 2,500
- Language: Hebrew, English (EMIS)
- Campus type: Suburban

HaKfar HaYarok - Levi Eshkol Green Village (Hebrew: הכפר הירוק) is a youth village in Israel, located in southern Ramat HaSharon, along the northern border of Tel Aviv.

== Name ==
Gershon Zak, who founded the village in 1950, called it "Green Village" with the intention to name it after David Ben-Gurion (1886–1973), whose original name was Gryn or Grün, lit. "green" in Yiddish or German. However, many people did not understand the message contained in the name, and over the years a definite article "The" was added to the institution's name. Twenty years later, after the death of Israel's third Prime Minister, Levi Eshkol (1895–1969), which occurred before the death of the older Ben-Gurion, "the green village" was named after Eshkol, becoming "The Levi Eshkol Green Village".

== History ==
The village started as an agricultural boarding school with an emphasis on agricultural work. Zak established the village with an eye towards having a youth community that would partially oversee itself with adult supervision over security, health and studies. This was a cornerstone of socialized education at the time.

In the 60's there was even a sleep away camp at the Kfar of teenagers between the ages of 14 and 18. It was operated in the summer when some of the local students went home. The camp would alternate between taking the campers to historic sites, and having the campers participate in farm work and other activities conducted at the school.

In 2001 Dr. Kobi Naveh took over as CEO of the village. He instituted new ideas as to how to help the school evolve as a teaching institution, starting new programs and offering students from outside Israel the opportunity to learn things in a different way. While many educators working at the school had doubts as to whether Naveh's ideas would work, time proved them to be successful.

Shuki Stauber, author of the book written in 2019: "Yes It's Possible-Managing Change in an Educational Organization" discusses the processes of change initiated to make Hakfar Hayarok thriving.

Now 480 of the students at Kfar Hayarok are boarding school students. Other students commute from communities across central Israel, they are attracted by the special study courses offered. Some of these programs include an educational track taught in English (EMIS), veterinary studies and an arts program.

Today, the village has 2,500 students, from ages 12 to 20 (both residential students and external students). Each year a group of recent high school graduates do "Shnat Sherut" volunteer service before their IDF induction; they may come to live in the village as program counselors for the residential students.

HaKfar HaYarok has taken steps towards becoming an experimental youth village, with the support of the Ministry of Education. This program is based on environmental leadership.

== Schools ==
=== Anthroposophical school ===
Within the village there is an anthroposophical school: the Waldorf Urim school, which houses a teacher training seminary and a kindergarten that operates according to the Waldorf (or Steiner) method.

=== College ===
The college offers one-year and two-year courses.

=== Junior high school ===
The Junior High School, which includes 7th, 8th Grade Mofet Science Classes, is intended for highly motivated students with scientific orientation. The program includes classes in mathematics, chemistry or biology, computers, chess. The Mofet section prepares students for matriculation exams in the 10th and 11th grades, enabling them to start their higher education during the 11th-12th grades.

The high school offers a unique program called "Manhigut" ("leadership"), that emphasizes the less scientific more humanic classes.

The Junior High School also offers a 7th and 9th Grade Life Science program, which focuses on biology and animal behavior.

The high-school is one of the most advanced of its kind, incorporating advanced teaching methods and following the "22 Project" framework, using demonstrates alternative methods of teaching and student assessment. The school offers various majors in life-sciences, agriculture, music, multimedia, fashion design, computer-aided vehicle diagnostics, electronics, and information systems.

=== Special program for gifted students ===
In partnership with the Gifted Students Department of the Ministry of Education, HaKfar HaYarok offers a special program for gifted students. To be accepted, students are first evaluated by the Karni Institute in Kfar Saba.

=== Eastern Mediterranean International School ===
The village is home to the Eastern Mediterranean International School (EMIS), an international boarding school with students from more than 40 countries who take the International Baccalaureate (IB) curriculum or an original one-year Pre-DP program. The school was established in 2014 by Oded Rose, Itamar Grines and other international entrepreneurs. As of 2018 the school has around 170 students enrolled. EMIS became a project of Union for the Mediterranean (UfM) in June 2016 and has been supported by them in various projects such as the annual YOCOPAS (Youth Organised Collaboration on Peace and Sustainability). EMIS includes students from all over the world, with around 20% Israeli students 20% Palestinian or Arab students and 60% international students with aims of promoting and achieving the school's mission statement; "making education a force for peace and sustainability in the Middle East." Along with its mission statement, the school is also defined as a "school for change", with the founder, Rose, calling it "a platform for change, for entrepreneurship, for peace, sustainability, for dreams and for hope." Throughout its existence EMIS has partnered with The Leon Charney Resolution Center, which shares similar goals to EMIS and believes in dialogue and the value of peace and holds annual peace simulations with engaging students. EMIS actively discusses the ongoing Israeli–Palestinian conflict and aims to use education to provide a platform for change within the many communities and cultures involved, carrying out annual conferences, projects, and activities for passionate students from EMIS and for interested students from the region or abroad.

== Tracks ==
The "HaKfar HaYarok" school offers several study tracks:

- Engineering and Space Sciences Track – Enrichment in physics and mathematics, incorporating additional fields of interest such as fundamentals of aeronautics, astrophysics, aviation, and space studies. This is a six-year program that includes 5-unit level studies in algorithmics/electronics/aero-space, biology/chemistry/physics, and a group final project worth 5 units, which is a technological prototype integrating the knowledge acquired in the track.
- International Leadership and Diplomacy Track – This track is designed for students with high academic abilities, strong social skills, and a talent for language acquisition. The track combines standard core subjects with enrichment content, alongside two main areas of study: enhanced language studies including advanced levels of English, spoken Arabic, and an additional language; and other subjects that vary each year. Outside of the regular curriculum, students can engage in the Model UN program and participate in the school's delegation. There are also two major projects – a collaboration with the international school EMIS located at HaKfar HaYarok and a cross-cultural youth program; as well as enrichment courses at the university level (through the Youth for Science program) in international leadership, Middle Eastern studies, and East Asian studies.
- Mofet Track – An enhanced learning program in scientific subjects. It is intended for students who excel academically and demonstrate exemplary behavior, as well as curious students seeking academic challenges. This track offers 5-unit level studies in subjects like mathematics, English, physics, computer science, or electronics, and a final software engineering project. The track is connected to the Mofet Association.
- Gifted Students Track – A track offering additional enrichment for gifted students, in collaboration with the Department for Gifted Students at the Ministry of Education. It is designed for external students without access to special classes for the gifted in their locality, and for boarding students from across the country. Enrichment includes both scientific and humanistic subjects, with additional intensive enrichment sessions (six times instead of once for other classes) and study days at Tel Aviv University. It is also possible to combine university degree studies with school studies through university programs.
- Pre-Medical and Veterinary Medicine Track – A track providing enrichment in medical studies. Students can choose between human medicine and veterinary medicine. The track also includes advanced studies in physics or biology, mathematics, chemistry, and health sciences.
- Environmental Leadership Track – This track focuses on developing leadership skills and instilling social and national values, integrating students into public service and national leadership roles. It develops leadership skills and provides rhetorical training to enhance expression and interpersonal communication skills. The track includes visits to Tel Aviv University. Additional activities in this program include recycling of cans and bottles, outdoor camping to learn about habitat conservation, leadership activities such as field training, and "green leadership" training aimed at learning ways to obtain equipment and food from nature without causing harm. As part of their training, members of the track are required to volunteer in the dining hall, where they acquire practical skills such as cooperation and machine operation.
- Economic-Social Leadership Track – Combines content from the leadership track with current affairs and social issues alongside the study of economics and understanding life in the State of Israel.
- Classical Music Track – Provides professional-level education in the fundamentals of music, music history, and more, including participation in various chamber ensembles. The track also includes participation in the classical symphony orchestra of HaKfar HaYarok, conducted by Benjamin Yusupov, or in the school choir. Fundamentals and history of music are studied at a 5-unit level, and the final recital for matriculation is at a 10-unit level, in addition to regular music studies.
- Chess Track – A track for students interested in combining studies in the field of chess. The students have access to a grandmaster-level teacher, and those with higher chess ratings join the HaKfar HaYarok chess team, which is currently ranked first in Israel.

== Notable alumni ==
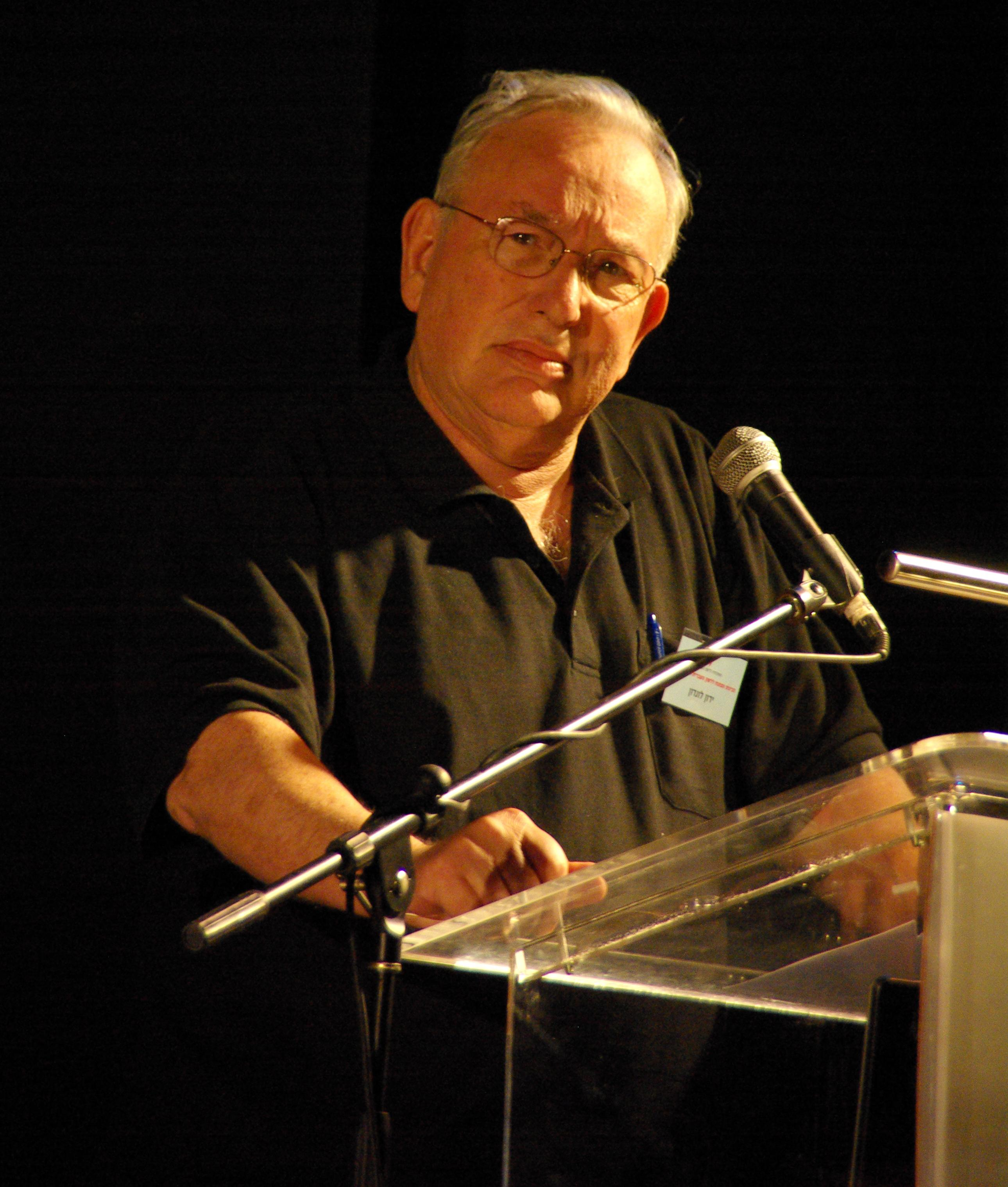
Yaron London

- Yaron London (born 1940), media personality, journalist, actor, and songwriter
- Micha Ullman (born 1939), sculptor and art professor
- Micha Tomkiewicz (born 1939), scientist, writer and professor
- Yisrael Poliakov (1941–2007), comedian, singer and actor, member of the "Pale-Face Trackers" (Gashashim) ensemble
- Benny Gantz (born 1959), 20th chief of general staff of Israel
- David J. Steiner (1965–2016), documentary filmmaker, educator, writer, rabbi and political activist

== Gallery ==
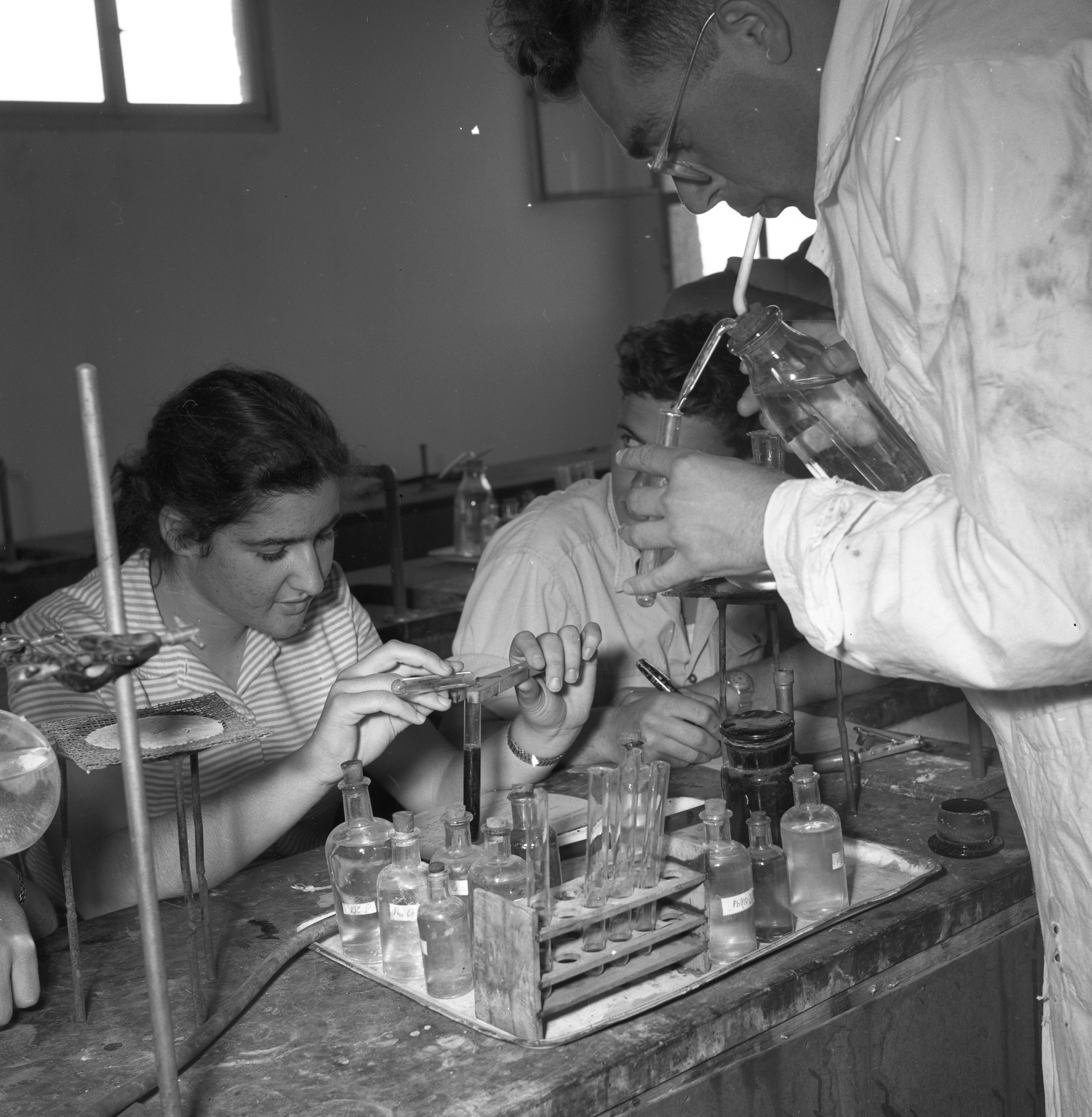
HaKfar HaYarok (1955)

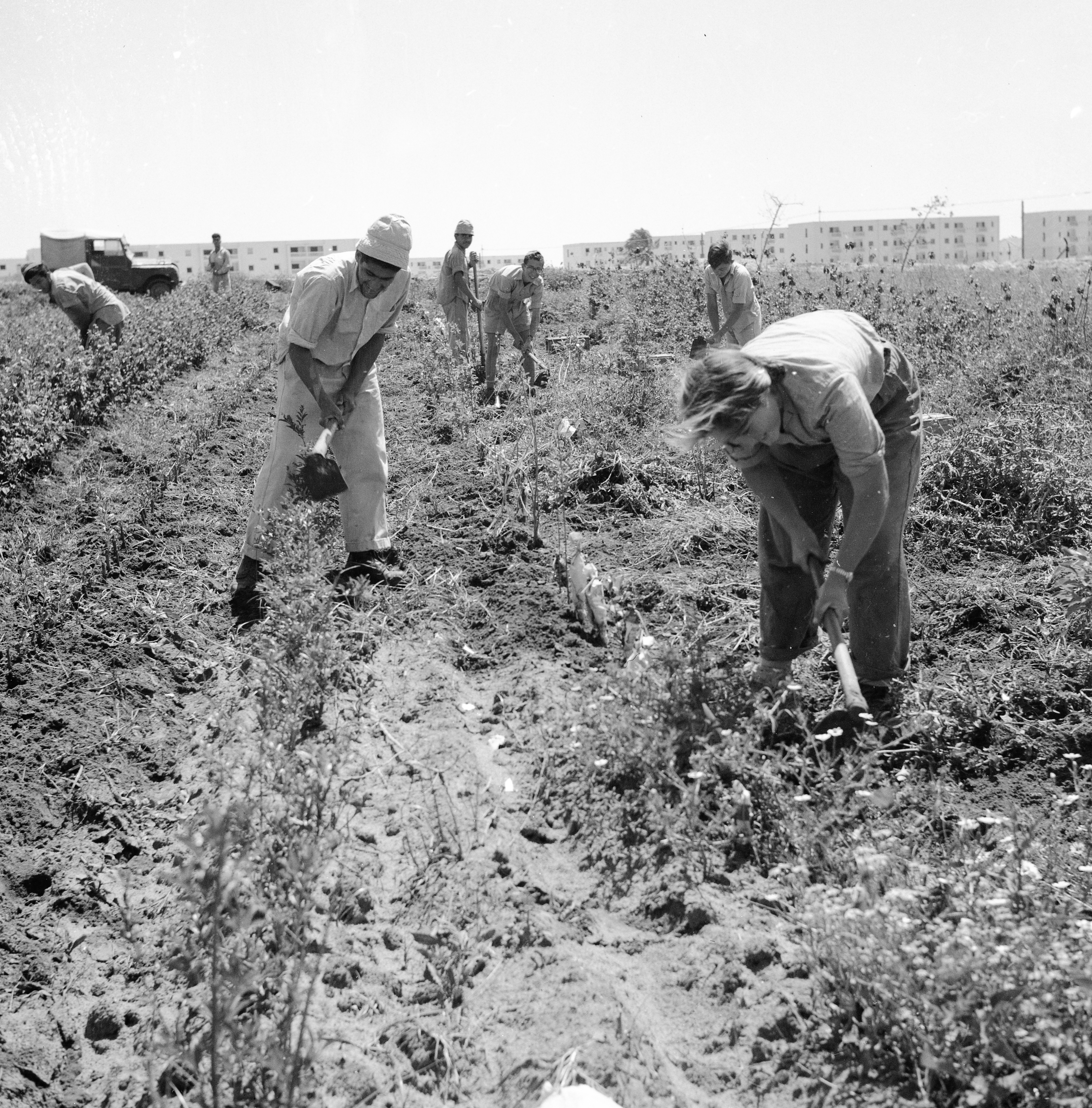
HaKfar HaYarok (1955)

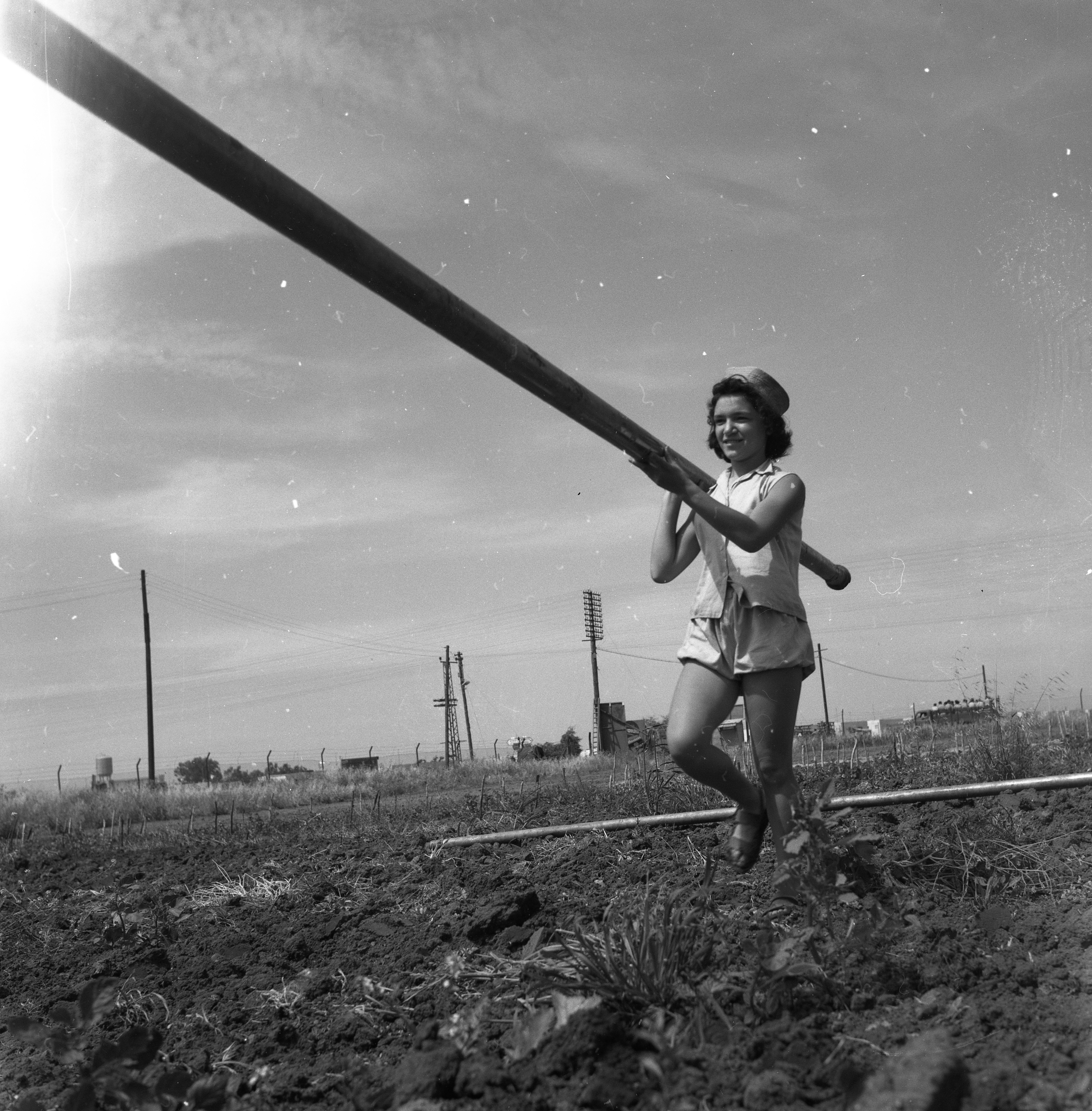
HaKfar HaYarok (1955)

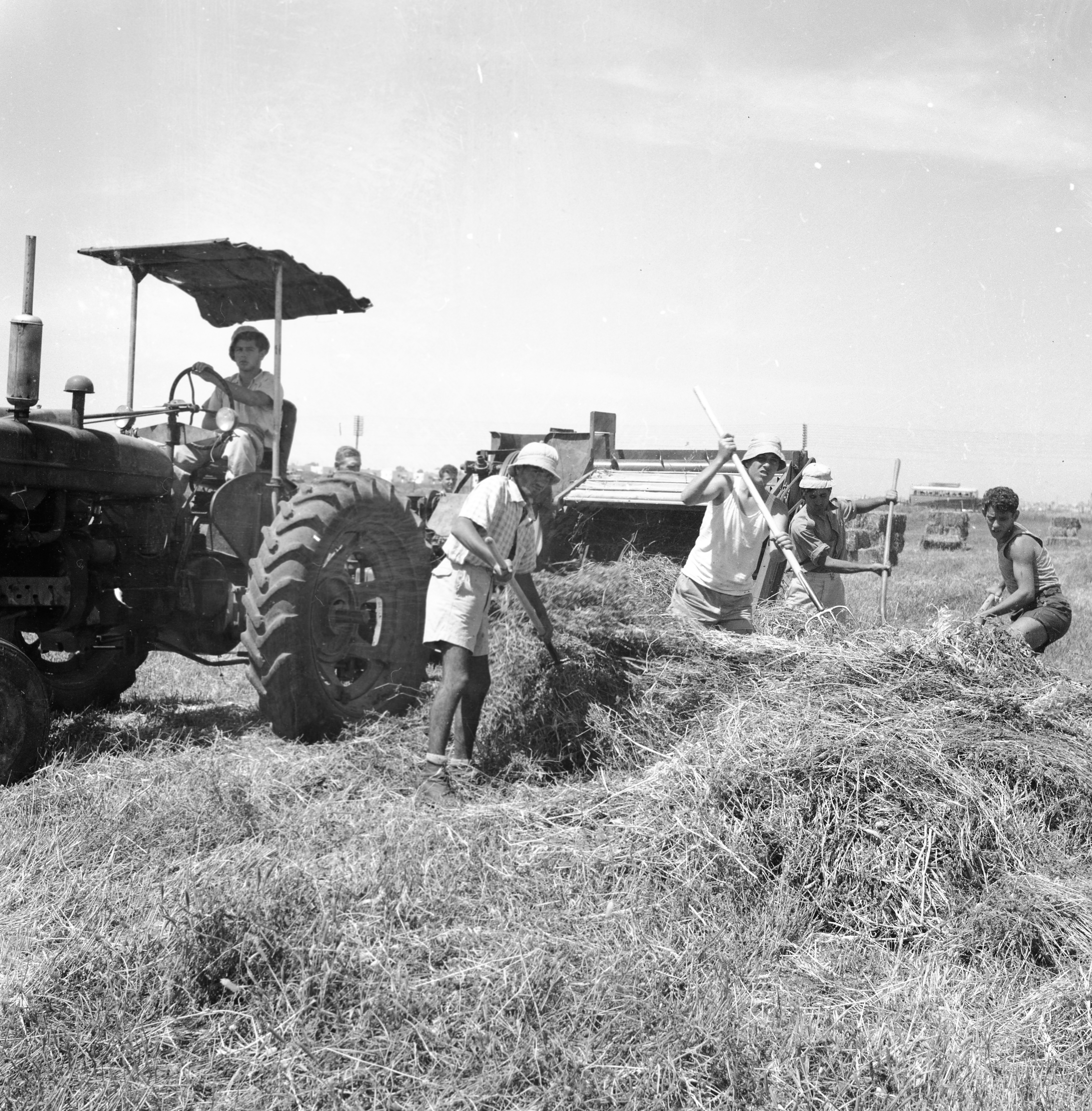
HaKfar HaYarok (1955)

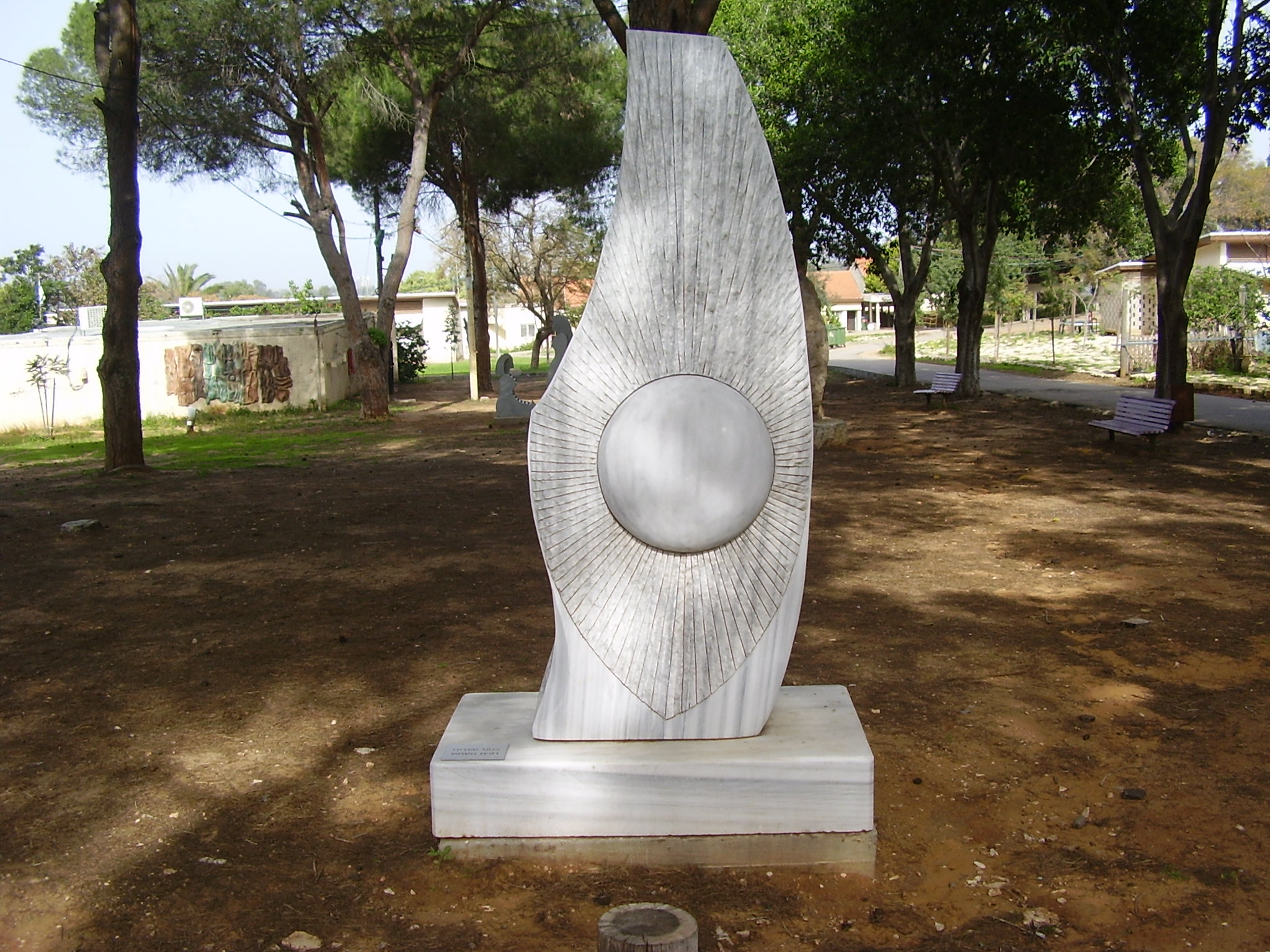
Sculpture garden

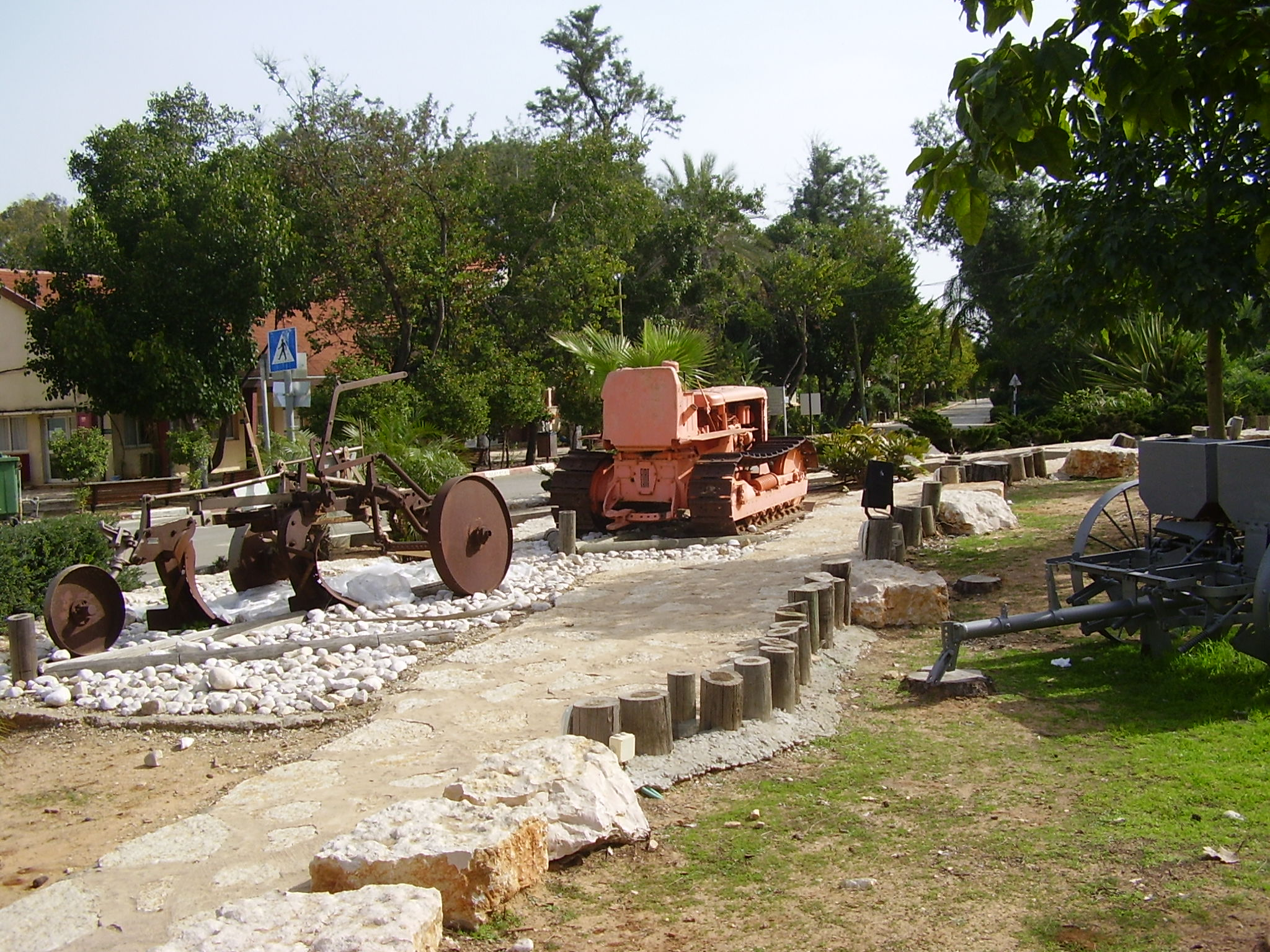
HaKfar HaYarok (2010)

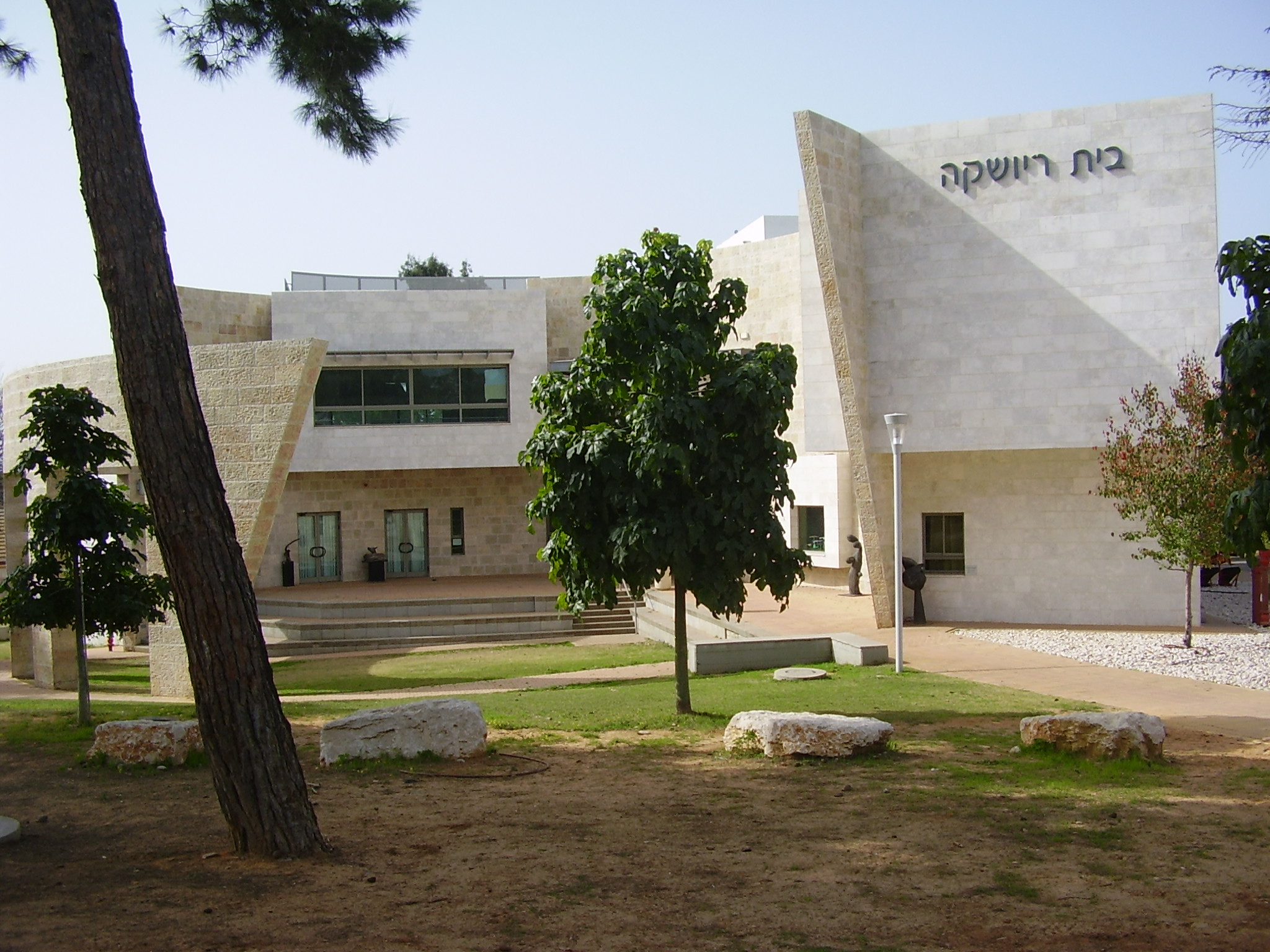
Arts house

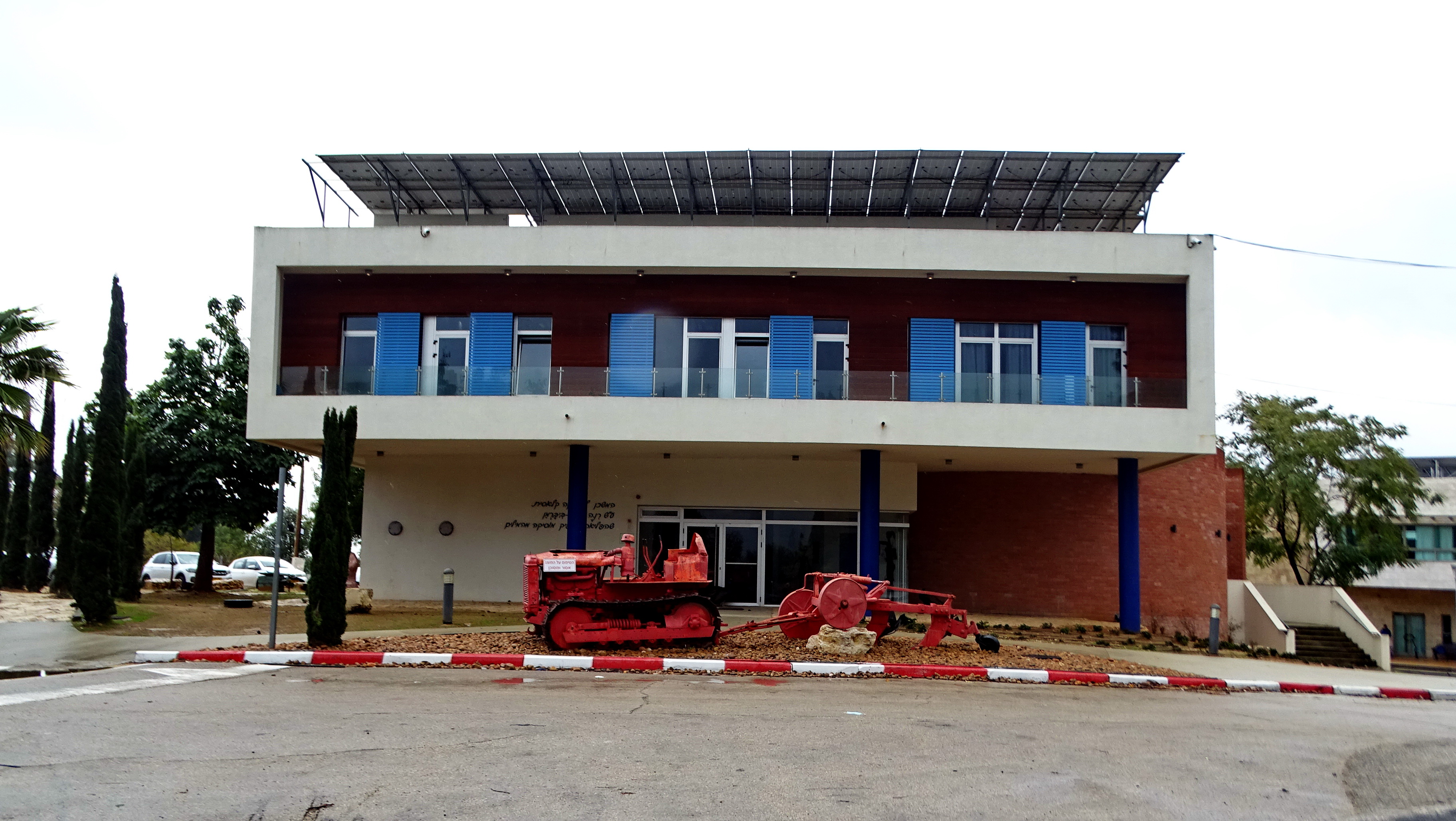
HaKfar HaYarok campus building

== See also ==
- Givat Haviva – a left-wing, shared society oriented educational institute in Israel
- Hand in Hand: Center for Jewish Arab Education in Israel
- List of Israel Prize recipients
- Neve Shalom – a cooperative village jointly founded by Israeli Jews and Palestinian-Israeli Arabs
