= Micha Tomkiewicz =

Polish scientist (born 1939)

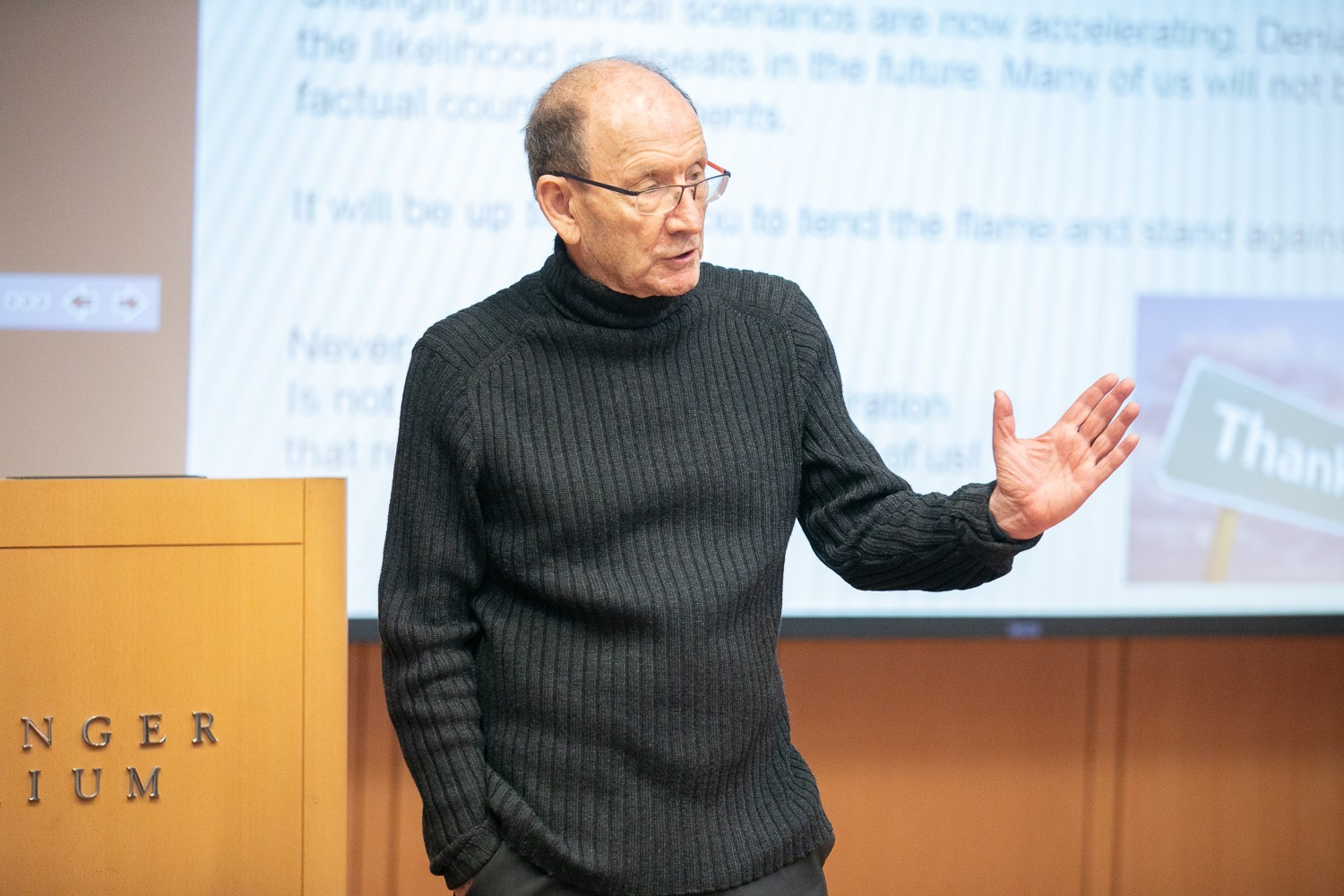
- Micha Tomkiewicz speaks at Brooklyn College on Holocaust Remembrance Day 2020
- Born: May 25, 1939 (age 86); Warsaw, Poland
- Education: Hebrew University of Jerusalem; University of Guelph; University of California, Berkeley

Micha Tomkiewicz (born May 25, 1939) is a Polish scientist, professor and writer.

== Biography ==
Marcelli Robert (his name was changed after the war to "Micha") Tomkiewicz was born on May 25, 1939, in Warsaw, Poland, and lived in the Warsaw Ghetto before his family was sent off to the German concentration camp Bergen-Belsen. On Friday, April 13, 1945, Tomkiewicz was among the 2,500 Jewish prisoners rescued from one of what have now come to be known as the Bergen-Belsen Death Trains. As the war drew to a close, the Germans, anticipating the arrival of Allied forces had evacuated these prisoners and loaded them onto trains headed to Theresienstadt, a concentration camp further from the front lines. The American 743rd Tank Battalion of the 30th Infantry Division came to one of the three trains, which had been abandoned near Magdeburg by fleeing German troops. Tomkiewicz was 6 at the time, when he, along with his mother and uncle were liberated. They soon relocated to Palestine to rebuild their lives.

On Thursday, September 13, 2007, Tomkiewicz was reunited with two fellow survivors of the death trains as well as retired State Supreme Court judge, Carrol Walsh, who was one of the rescuing soldiers at the time. This meeting resulted as part of an early 1990s class project launched by Matthew Rozell, a history teacher at Hudson Falls High School in Hudson Falls, New York. It also prompted the production of "A Train Near Magdeburg," a 10-minute DVD created by two of Rozell's students.

== Education ==
In Israel, Tomkiewicz attended Ben-Shemen and HaKfar HaYarok, boarding schools that were constructed to help Holocaust survivors reenter civilization. Tomkiewicz earned his Ph.D (1969) and his M.Sc. (1963) in Physical chemistry from the Hebrew University of Jerusalem. He did his postdoctoral education at University of Guelph in Canada and University of California, Berkeley.

== Educational activities ==
Tomkiewicz is a professor of Physics in the Department of Physics, Brooklyn College, where he has worked since 1979. He is also a Professor of Physics and Chemistry at the CUNY Graduate Center. In addition, he was the founding-director of the Environmental Studies Program at Brooklyn College and has served as its director for 15 years. He is also the Director of the Electrochemistry Institute at that same institution. He has served as the divisional editor for the Journal of the Electrochemical Society and as Chairman for the Energy and Technology Division of the Electrochemical Society. He was a member of the International Organizing Committee of the conferences on Photochemical Conversion and Storage of Solar Energy that were held from 1989 to 1992.

== Energy research ==
Tomkiewicz research interests focus on alternative (non-fossil) energy sources that include semiconducting photoelectrochemical solar devices, batteries and disposal of nuclear waste. In 1998, Tomkiewicz changed his research and educational focus to join the movement to mitigate the global impact of present energy use.

== Climate change and teaching ==
Tomkiewicz is instrumental in the movement to broaden awareness and understanding of the phenomenon of global warming. Tomkiewicz has taught classes about climate change for the last fifteen years. He continues to research the causes of climate change, as well as its ongoing and predicted effects on civilization. Tomkiewicz's book, Climate Change: The Fork at the End of Now, published in June 2011 by Momentum Press addresses these issues, laying them out in terms that are both accurate and accessible for general consumption. He has drawn parallels between active genocide like the Holocaust and the negligence of ignoring or denying current and ongoing climate trends, where “the consequences amount to global suicide - a self-inflicted genocide.“

== Published works ==
Tomkiewicz has published several works relating to climate change, and co-authored an article relating to plagiarism in academia.

=== Publications ===
- "Climate Change: The Fork at the End of Now." Momentum Press 2011
- "Environmental Aspects of Electrodeposition." Modern Electroplating 5th ed. Ed. M. Schlesinger. John Wiley. (Books and Publications: Chapter) 2010
- "On the Feasibility of a Timely Transition to a More Sustainable Energy Future." Sustainability 2: pages 204-14. (Books and Publications: Peer Reviewed Article) 2010
- Scarlatos, L.L., M. Tomkiewicz, A. Bulchandani, K.A. Srinaivasan and P. Naik. "Intelligent Energy Choices." Proceedings of the 20th IASTED International Conference on Modeling and Simulation. Banff, Alberta, July 6–8. (Books and Publications: Peer Reviewed Article) 2009
- DeLuca, G. and M. Tomkiewicz. "Personalizing the Anti-plagiarism Campaign." Plagiary 9.1. (Books and Publications: Peer Reviewed Article) 2007
- "'Global Warming' Science, Money, and Self Preservation." Compte Rendus Chimie 9: 172. (Books and Publications: Peer Reviewed Article) 2006
- "Computer Simulation of Energy Choices," Proceedings of the International Conference on Energy, Environment and Disasters. (Books and Publications: Peer Reviewed Article) 2005
- Conferences, Seminars and Symposiums
- 15th International Conference on Photochemical Conversion and Storage of Solar Energy. July. (Conferences, Seminars and Symposiums: Invited Talk) 2004
- Ninth Annual Conference on Environmental Issues. Medgar Evers College. Brooklyn, New York March. (Conferences, Seminars and Symposiums: Invited Talk) 2004
