= Saving Barbara Sizemore =

- Theatrical release poster
- Directed by: David J. Steiner
- Written by: David J. Steiner
- Produced by: David J. Steiner
- Starring: David J. Steiner; Cornel West; Richard Steele; David Ireland; Jada Jones; Jocelyn Mills; Danielle Robinson; Jonathan Speller; Hayah Rasul; Rashad Howze; Terrance Dantzler; Keenan Reese; Kahmyrah Morgan
- Cinematography: David J. Steiner
- Edited by: David J. Steiner
- Music by: Students of the Barbara A. Sizemore Academy; Joel Frankel
- Production company: Third Eye Media
- Release date: August 27, 2016
- Running time: 83 minutes
- Country: United States
- Language: English

Saving Barbara Sizemore is a 2016 American documentary film directed by and starring David J. Steiner, an American independent filmmaker. Steiner's film follows the students, teachers and parents of the Barbara A. Sizemore Academy, a charter school in the Englewood area of Chicago. Barbara A. Sizemore Academy serves an African-American community which is economically disadvantaged and beset by violence. The film documents the school's unique methods, which rely heavily on African culture, customs and social structure.

== Content ==
In Englewood, a majority African-American neighborhood on the South Side of Chicago, children are being dropped off at Barbara A. Sizemore Academy (BASA). The school views itself as a "village", and children refer to the adults as "Mamas" and "Babas". Filmmaker/narrator David J. Steiner introduces himself, and calls BASA "an urban village, an oasis in the heart of Englewood".

The students gather for morning assembly and sing African songs as drums play. Danielle Robinson, the principal of the BASA, explains that Afrocentric education is not about hate or intolerance of other perspectives, but is about self-esteem and discovering one's roots. Robinson extols the school as the safest place around, and the parents' of the children agree.

At the morning assembly, the kids pledge to lead a principled life and to improve their communities. In the classroom, teacher Jocelyn Mills ("Mama Jocelyn") tells the kids that "the first village is in them", and to improve the village, they must first improve themselves. We then learn about the school's philosophy of providing healthy food to kids whose dietary choices outside of the school are usually substandard. The older kids then join Steiner for lunch and discuss their future plans and views on issues of race.

At an assembly, Principal Danielle Robinson informs the students that the Chicago Public Schools ("CPS") have decided to close BASA at the end of the school year. David Ireland explains that CPS is a "financial cesspool", and because of that, they need to close schools to save money. He states that CPS used inappropriate methodologies to alter student test scores as a rationale for deciding to close the school.

In response, a group of students prepares to confront Chicago school superintendent Forrest Claypool. The students practice answering questions and providing information in support of keeping their school open. Steiner and the kids arrive at Claypool's headquarters and ask to see Claypool but are denied a meeting. They then try to meet with Chicago Mayor Rahm Emanuel, but to no avail.

On January 20, 2016, Robinson, Steiner, Terrance and Hayah visit a television morning talk show, and plead their case. She mentions that CPS used altered test scores, and not the actual ones, as their rationale to close the school.

The Illinois State Charter School Commission holds a public appeals hearing at Sizemore. Executives from the Chicago Public Schools argue why their data requires that BASA be closed. In rebuttal, Ireland, Robinson, Speller and other administrators from BASA state their position and plead that the school be allowed to stay open. "We really love our children," Robinson says. Hayah tells the commission that BASA is her "second family".

Steiner appears on the Richard Steele radio show and discusses the Sizemore struggle, as well as his teaching methodologies. He discusses the visit to Claypool's office, and how the students prepared for it.

In the last scene, the BASA community gathers for the final hearing of the Illinois Charter School Commission. After the hearing, Robinson exultantly reports to the students that they won the appeal. Everyone celebrates and hugs each other.

As a postscript, the end credits mention that CPS has sued to overturn the Charter School Commission's decision and has decided not to renew BASA's campus lease.

== Reception and aftermath ==
Saving Barbara Sizemore premiered at the 2016 Capital City Black Film Festival in Austin, Texas on August 27, 2016. It won Best Documentary Feature at the Twin Cities Black Film Festival and appeared at numerous other festivals. One such festival was the Nile's Diaspora Film Festival in Uganda, where Steiner exhibited his film as he was making his second documentary feature. Included in his crew were Terrance Dantzler and Hayah Rasul. On December 26, 2016, Steiner was killed in a bus accident in Iganga, Uganda, after leaving a Christmas party.

In 2017, the Barbara A. Sizemore Academy renamed their media studies center the "David J. Steiner Digital Media Department", in honor of the man whose film helped save their school.

== See also ==
- Betty Shabazz International Charter School
- List of black films of the 2010s
