= Herbert Kliebard =

American historian and professor

Herbert M. Kliebard
- Born: July 24, 1930; New York City, US
- Died: June 8, 2015 (aged 84); Evanston, Illinois, US
- Occupation(s): Historian of education, professor
- Known for: The Struggle for the American Curriculum

Herbert M. Kliebard (July 24, 1930 - June 8, 2015) was an American historian of education, and professor at the University of Wisconsin–Madison. He is best known for his 1995 book, The Struggle for the American Curriculum.

== Early life ==
Kliebard was born in the Bronx on July 24, 1930, the only child of Yetta (Yaskulka) and Morris Kliebard. He graduated from Christopher Columbus High School, thereafter attending City College in New York, where he obtained his A.B. in English and, thereafter, his M.A. After teaching for a year at Bronx Vocational College - the inspiration for the novel and movie Blackboard Jungle - he served in the Army's Medical Corps, returning upon completion of his stint to his prior teaching position. He later worked as a reading specialist for the Nyack Public School System before beginning his doctoral studies at Teacher's College, Columbia University.

As a child, he studied with world-renowned Yiddishists - a matter of considerable pride. He was an avid collector of antiques, first and foremost, Judaica. Over one hundred pieces of his Judaica collection are currently on long-term loan to the Chazen Museum in Madison, WI.

== Scholarship ==
Kliebard is best known for his 1995 book The Struggle for the American Curriculum, which continues to be his most celebrated work. During his lengthy post-secondary education career, Kliebard was a prolific author writing nearly 100 articles and several books.

== Personal life ==
He was married for 43 years to Bernice (Bleiweiss) Kliebard (1933-2000), with whom he had two children, Diane J. Kliebard (Silverberg) (b. 1961) and Kenneth M. Kliebard (b. 1963), both attorneys in Chicago.
