= American eccentric cinema =

Mode of American filmmaking

American Eccentric Cinema
- Years active: Early-1990s–present
- Location: United States
- Influences: New Hollywood; Art film; Experimental film; Independent film

American eccentric cinema is a mode of contemporary American filmmaking that emerged in what has been termed the metamodern or new sincerity. Its attachment to indie cinema has led some to consider it a movement and genre of cinema in the United States. Its key filmmakers, including Wes Anderson, Charlie Kaufman, and Spike Jonze, are at times referred to as the "American Eccentrics". It occurred during the 1990s and 2000s, when indie directors sought to create films that diverted from the style and content of Hollywood franchise films. American eccentric cinema came in opposition to the mainstream ideas of formulaic narratives and the digitisation within films and new technologies that came about during the time period. American eccentric cinema is marked by films that are "deeply concerned with ethics and morality, the obligations of the individual, the effects of family breakdown, and social alienation."

== Background ==
American eccentric cinema was critically conceived in response to traditional Hollywood and films of popular culture which often had clear, predictable characters and narratives. American eccentric cinema has been framed as influenced by the new Hollywood era. Both traditions have similar themes and narratives of existentialism and the need for human interaction.

New Hollywood focuses on the darker elements of humanity and society within the context of the American Dream in the mid-1960s to the early 1980s. with themes that were reflective of sociocultural issues and were centered around the potential meaninglessness of pursuing the American Dream as generation upon generation motivated to possess it. In comparison, American eccentric cinema does not have a distinct context, its films show characters who are very individual and their concerns are very distinct to their own personalities. American eccentric cinema is considered a shift in contemporary American cinema in the 1990s and 2000s driven by metamodern philosophical and moral beliefs.

American eccentric cinema is also known as "American smart cinema", a tradition delineated by Jeffrey Sconce and Claire Perkins. Both film traditions consist mostly of American indie films from the 1990s and 2000s and have similar aesthetic strategies, particularly a focus on irony. However, as Kim Wilkins notes, despite the crossovers between the two forms of cinema, American eccentricity "uses irony not primarily for its tonal qualities but, rather, for dramatic and thematic functions".

At a period of American history where postwar communities were growing older, many ideals were being re-evaluated and looked at critically in American eccentric cinema. The genre's films look at emotions and where they come from as well as expectations for what a happy life should be. American eccentric cinema sees happiness as not necessarily being in a domestic life; in a marriage or family. The filmmakers of the genre were influenced by their own lives where their perception of the domestic world could include feelings and emotions of "abandonment, alienation and frustration".

The film tradition also takes influences from postmodernism through the movement's attitudes of irony and sensations of "detachment" to society. But while filmmakers of American eccentric cinema position themselves in a critical manner, they also strive to create significant and unique art forms through various techniques and film features employed.

Films of American eccentric cinema were also made before, during and after the September 11 attacks, when social desires were primarily concerned with being safe and secure. At this time the rights and principles of American liberalism were being challenged and ideas of existentialism were common within art.

== Characteristics ==
While American eccentric cinema films have distinct individual and stylistic visions, they share common themes and textual practices. American eccentric cinema is concerned about an individual's internal dilemmas and existentialism as a human being, regardless of the context. The film techniques of the genre use aspects of mainstream cinema but alter the mainstream conventions slightly through characterisation, tone and style. American eccentric cinema is also known for its use of inter-textual references, quotations and irony. By doing this, an audience's expectation of what may happen is subverted. Filmmakers go into the depth of a protagonist's journey finding their sense of self as the narrative.

American eccentric cinema falls within independent cinema culture. Independent cinema are types of films whose conventions oppose Hollywood mainstream sensibilities with characteristics such as no "forward-moving narrative drive" where the structure is not as ordered or bound by a sense of needed fast pace. Characters in eccentric cinema divert from those in mainstream Hollywood, which are comprehensible with journeys having a distinct beginning, complicated middle and happy ending. "Indie" characters, as well as American eccentric cinema characters, do not necessarily have goals to achieve in the films, or feel defined by them, and a sense of strength of morality may not be as present.

This type of cinema has been called "quirky", "cute" and "smart".

There are many alternate methods of exploring romantic love and sexuality within American eccentric cinema. The films explore gender roles as changing and often take a postfeminist stance. Characters often challenge and explore the expectations of marriage prior to the 1990s within the narrative as well as the complexities of sex and how society views it. Most characters are heterosexual and the complications of love are dealt with from the man-woman relationship perspective. However, director Todd Haynes comes as an exception as he explores LGBT relationships with films that were part of the beginning of the new queer cinema movement. In his 1995 acclaimed drama, Safe, he commented on self-help culture as a metaphor for the AIDS crisis in the late 1980s.

Race is not explored as prevalently within American eccentric films. According to Jesse Fox Mayshark portrayals of characters of a different race, that is, not white, are categorised within a "comic ethnic type". Mayshark perceives lack of diversity as a direct correlation within the genre's directors being primarily white Americans who may think of "other races and cultures" as only outsiders, alien in their comedic nature. Kim Wilkins states that to date the politics and style of American eccentric cinema have been informed by the overwhelmingly white male middle-upper demographic of its key filmmakers.

She writes "The focus in American eccentric films (like those in the 'smart' tendency) on 'white male urban sophisticates' situates them as a form of 'men's cinema', in Stella Bruzzi's terms. While neither existential anxiety nor irony is, in reality, the sovereign domain of white men, their cinematic articulation in the key films of the American eccentric mode, such as P.T. Anderson's Magnolia or Punch Drunk Love, David O. Russell's I Heart Huckabees or films by Wes Anderson or Charlie Kaufman, has largely evolved as a form 'grounded in the relationship between, masculinity—its ideology as well as its representation—and aesthetics.' Indeed, many of these films position masculinity as bound to the inability to directly articulate anxiety.

Thus, the use of irony in these films—both by characters and through aesthetic and formal strategies—is conveyed as a particularly masculine strategy; a means by which 'ugly' feelings can be repackaged as intellectual gameplay while simultaneously begging to be recognized for what it truly is." She goes on to note that the focus on white, urban, heterosexual men in American eccentric cinema adds to its relationship with neoliberalism: "It cannot be ignored that the protagonists of American Eccentric films are not only male but, on the whole, tend come from socioeconomically privileged backgrounds.

The socioeconomic (and gendered) status of these characters situates them as those most likely to succeed within capitalist systems. Unlike indie films within realist modes, such as the neorealist works of Kelly Reichardt or Sean Baker, American Eccentric Cinema does not tend to portray characters at crossroads where decisions made or changing circumstances have the capacity to fundamentally affect their livelihoods, safety, or personal agency. Often the absurd narrative goals of characters are only possible within these films because these characters are not beholden to the financial imperatives that drive more naturalistic characters toward what may be considered more realistic goals."

Politics are explored within the films, through the characters and their journeys. Rather than preaching political messages and creating controversial debates about political issues, they create subtle means to explore politics. Major events such as the September 11 attacks meant that the sense of American uncertainty that was pervading the national was reflected in themes such as self-doubt and insecurity within the characters.

== Interpretations on defining the genre ==
Scholars Kim Wilkins and Jesse Fox Mayshark have written extensively on American eccentric cinema and its place within film genre in their books American Eccentric Cinema and Post-Pop Cinema: The Search for Meaning in New American Film.

Wilkins, a film scholar at the University of Oslo, maintains that American eccentricity is a mode rather than a genre. She demarcates five criteria for the American eccentric mode: "1: The presence of allusion, parody, and intertextuality formally (in terms of genre and meta-cinematic depiction) and playfulness/cinephilia; 2: Sincere thematic underpinnings that are presented at a distance due to the film's perceived 'quirkiness', amusing occurrences, and/or absurd aesthetic; 3: A form of ironic expression that is both reflexive and sincere; 4: Characters and cinematic worlds that are designed to encourage audience alignment despite being clearly constructed; and, above all, 5: Effective and intellectual engagement with an experience of existential anxiety".

Wilkins analyses these textual tactics through four analytic lens—genre (with a focus on the road film), characterization, hyper-dialogue, and eccentric worlds. Although Wilkins states that American eccentricity is not an auteurist demarcation, she pays particular attention to the films of Spike Jonze and Wes Anderson. Wilkins explains that there is a distinct relationship between neoliberalism and American eccentric cinema. Neoliberalism is a set of principles proposing "that human well-being can be best advanced by liberating entrepreneurial freedoms and skills". In a neoliberal world, the person will constantly be shifting and altering facets of their life such as expertise and abilities and even their own sense of self to keep up with what is happening within the economy.

Within American eccentric films, this idea of neoliberalism aligns to the films' desires to portray individuals as their own selves rather than purely "national or community citizens". Wilkins states that because of this, and individuals not belonging in a community, it provides a foundation for many existential tensions and anxieties that are explored in the films. Thus, she concludes that American eccentric cinema responds to neoliberalism, as well as the existential concerns that were present during the new Hollywood era through means that are presented as ahistoric and primarily concerned with the characters' own experiences rather than broader socio-cultural or political concerns.

Mayshark, an editor at The New York Times, writes on American eccentric cinema filmmakers and analyses specific films within the genre. Mayshark says that the group of filmmakers were not explicitly categorised within any genre at the beginning of the movement because their films were extremely niche and individual, with varying styles and conventions. Their work defied convention and saw a new-found exploration of dark human themes through being idiosyncratic and individual. They wanted the audience to feel like they were a part of the stories and have a "transcendent connection".

As technologies emerge so too have discussions surrounding the expansion of the independent cinema genre and subsequently, American eccentric cinema. In a 1999 keynote address at the Independent Spirit Awards, in California, screenwriter and film producer, James Schamus "voiced the common concern that" commercial and major studios' "empires would ultimately threaten the existence" of independent cinema. "In Schamus' evaluation, independent film is...in decline" however, other commentators see evolution and cultural "transition...to give way to new and different possibilities."

== List of notable films ==
Title	Year	Director
Marie Antoinette	2006	Sofia Coppola
Closer to Home	1995	Joseph Nobile
Bottle Rocket	1996	Wes Anderson
Boogie Nights	1997	Paul Thomas Anderson
Slacker	1990	Richard Linklater
Dazed and Confused	1993	Richard Linklater
Poison	1991	Todd Haynes
Safe	1995	Todd Haynes
Spanking the Monkey	1994	David O. Russell
Flirting with Disaster	1996	David O. Russell
Being John Malkovich	1999	Spike Jonze
Adaptation	2002	Spike Jonze
Human Nature	2001	Michel Gondry
Eternal Sunshine of the Spotless Mind	2004	Michel Gondry
Fight Club	1999	David Fincher
Lost in Translation	2003	Sofia Coppola
Donnie Darko	2001	Richard Kelly
Your Friends & Neighbors	1998	Neil LaBute
The Life Aquatic with Steve Zissou	2004	Wes Anderson
The Squid and the Whale	2005	Noah Baumbach
Citizen Ruth	1996	Alexander Payne
Election	1999	Alexander Payne
About Schmidt	2002	Alexander Payne
Sideways	2004	Alexander Payne
Before Sunrise	1995	Richard Linklater
I Heart Huckabees	2004	David O. Russell
Waking Life	2001	Richard Linklater
Magnolia	1999	Paul Thomas Anderson
Velvet Goldmine	1998	Todd Haynes
Far From Heaven	2002	Todd Haynes
Anomalisa	2015	Charlie Kaufman and Duke Johnson
Happiness	1998	Todd Solondz
Very Bad Things	1998	Peter Berg
Storytelling	2001	Todd Solondz
Welcome to the Dollhouse	1995	Todd Solondz
In the Company of Men	1997	Neil LaBute
The Unbelievable Truth	1989	Hal Hartley
Trust	1990	Hal Hartley
Henry Fool	1997	Hal Hartley
Simple Men	1992	Hal Hartley
The Ice Storm	1997	Ang Lee
2 Days in the Valley	1996	John Herzfeld
Rushmore	1998	Wes Anderson
The Royal Tenenbaums	2001	Wes Anderson
The Sweet Hereafter	1997	Atom Egoyan
Punch-Drunk Love	2002	Paul Thomas Anderson
The Grand Budapest Hotel	2014	Wes Anderson
Damsels in Distress	2011	Whit Stillman
Juno	2007	Jason Reitman
Synecdoche, New York	2008	Charlie Kaufman
Lady Bird	2017	Greta Gerwig
The Darjeeling Limited	2007	Wes Anderson
Barcelona	1994	Whit Stillman
The Last Days of Disco	1998	Whit Stillman
The Chumscrubber	2005	Arie Posin
Metropolitan	1990	Whit Stillman
The Savages	2007	Tamara Jenkins
Ghost World	2001	Terry Zwigoff
Clerks	1994	Kevin Smith
Palindromes	2004	Todd Solondz

== List of notable figures ==
=== Filmmakers ===
- Wes Anderson
- Paul Thomas Anderson
- Richard Linklater
- Todd Haynes
- David O. Russell
- Charlie Kaufman
- Spike Jonze
- Michel Gondry
- David Fincher
- Sofia Coppola
- Richard Kelly
- Neil LaBute
- Todd Solondz
- Noah Baumbach
- Alexander Payne
- Peter Berg
- Joseph Nobile
- Hal Hartley
- Ang Lee
- John Herzfeld
- Whit Stillman
- Miranda July
- Lena Dunham
- Greta Gerwig
- Alex Ross Perry
- Mike Mills
- Jared Hess
- Jason Reitman
- Kevin Smith

=== Actors ===
- Ben Stiller
- Mark Wahlberg
- Bill Murray
- Julianne Moore
- Jason Schwartzman
- Owen Wilson
- Luke Wilson
- Elliot Page
- Michael Cera
- Zooey Deschanel
- Frances McDormand
- Tilda Swinton
- Angelina Jolie
- Anjelica Huston
- Adrien Brody
- Scarlett Johansson

== Legacy ==
Rushmore, Slacker and Clerks were each inducted into the National Film Registry.

Three films of Wes Anderson (Grand Budapest Hotel, Royal Tenenbaums and Moonrise Kingdom) alongside Before Sunset, Lost in Translation, Eternal Sunshine of the Spotless Mind, Far from Heaven and Synecdoche, New York were listed on the BBC's 100 Greatest Films of the 21st Century.

== See also ==
- Alternative rock
- Frat Pack
- Generation X
- Indiewood
- Music videos
- Slow cinema
- Toronto New Wave
- Transnational cinema
