= The Girl from Monday =

- DVD cover
- Directed by: Hal Hartley
- Written by: Hal Hartley
- Produced by: Steve Hamilton; Hal Hartley
- Starring: Bill Sage; Sabrina Lloyd; Tatiana Abracos; Leo Fitzpatrick
- Cinematography: Sarah Crawley
- Music by: Hal Hartley
- Distributed by: Miramax
- Release date: 2005
- Running time: 84 minutes
- Country: United States
- Language: English

The Girl from Monday is a 2005 American film directed by Hal Hartley. The film deals with the consequences of business monopolization and globalization. Filmed in New York City and Puerto Rico, the film was first shown at the Sundance Film Festival. After a limited run in New York, it was shown at various festivals in America and Europe.

== Plot ==
Some time in the future United States, a being from another planet (Abracos) arrives on Earth and takes human form.

In voiceover, Jack Bell (Bill Sage), an advertising executive, explains how his ideas came to bring the "triple M" into power and reduce human beings to mere consumers, pawns of the corporation. Flash-forwards show his visit to a "gun boutique" to buy a pistol, and a suicide attempt in his car.

The innovative idea Jack contributes to Triple M is that, since sexually active people are the most active consumers, people will record each of their sexual encounters as an economic transaction. This will increase their desirability rating, their value as sexual commodities, and therefore also their credit rating. Because of its direct relation to one's credit rating and buying power, insurance policies covering a person's sexual desirability are available.

To give himself an alibi during an action he planned for the counter-revolution, Jack attempts to hook up with his co-worker Cecile (Sabrina Lloyd) but loses heart, leading the insurance company to investigate why this happened. Jack claims that he has been unable to have successful sex since his wife drowned in the ocean. The insurance agent decides it's not Cecile's fault and her premium remains the same, while Jack's is raised. Meanwhile, the planned counter-revolutionary assault on Triple M headquarters is somehow thwarted, and the counter-revolutionaries go on the run. The news broadcasts claim two people were killed, and the police start a manhunt for the perpetrators.

By chance Cecile meets up with William, young leader in the counter-revolution, who takes her to a place where people have sex just because it feels free and good. Cecile is arrested for having non-economic sex, now criminalized under Triple M, and sentenced to "two years hard labor... teaching high school". The classes are taught through virtual reality helmets, while the students are all legally armed and drugged daily with anti-anxiety medications. Coincidentally, William is one of Cecile's students. Cecile reads Henry David Thoreau's book Walden, passed secretly to her by William, and is inspired to join the counter-revolution.

Meanwhile, Jack drives to the beach where his wife apparently drowned. He overdoses on pills and vodka, but loses consciousness before he can shoot himself. William finds him, thinks him dead, and takes the pistol to continue his counter-revolutionary activities. When Jack regains consciousness he finds the girl from the planet Monday (named after its discoverer, Vincent Monday, explains Jack in voice-over) arising from the water. He secretes her at home and teaches her how to fit into human society. The girl calls herself "Nobody;" she has arrived to retrieve an earlier "immigrant" from her planet. Several coincidences and adventures later, including a threesome between Jack, Cecile, and Nobody, a police raid on a dress boutique, and Nobody prostituting herself to Cecile's high school principal to get Cecile released from jail, Nobody is convinced her mission is a failure and she decides to go home.

Jack, it turns out, is also an "immigrant" from that planet, and has tried and failed to go home. They proceed to the ocean, where the girl walks into the water and disappears. Jack says he doesn't know if she made it or not.

== Reception ==
Stephen Holden, writing for The New York Times, opines that "Like so many science fiction fantasies, Hal Hartley's new film begins with a clever satirical premise, then stumbles all over itself trying to tell a coherent, original story." Peter Hanson, writing for Film Threat, called it "A profoundly unnecessary movie."

In comparison to Hartley's earlier work, this film and No Such Thing "may have lacked the impact of his first features, [but] they certainly demonstrate that Hartley is a director still unafraid to take apart and reassemble the medium."

== Availability ==
The region 1 DVD release came out on November 7, 2006 and was made available to Netflix customers to rent.

Artificial Eye released the region 2 PAL-format DVD as part of their Hal Hartley Collection, available as a standalone edition or in a 3-disc set with Trust and Henry Fool.

In 2012, the film's screenplay was released exclusively on Hal Hartley's website in a book that also included the screenplays for The Book of Life and No Such Thing.
