= Bill Sage =

American actor (born 1962)

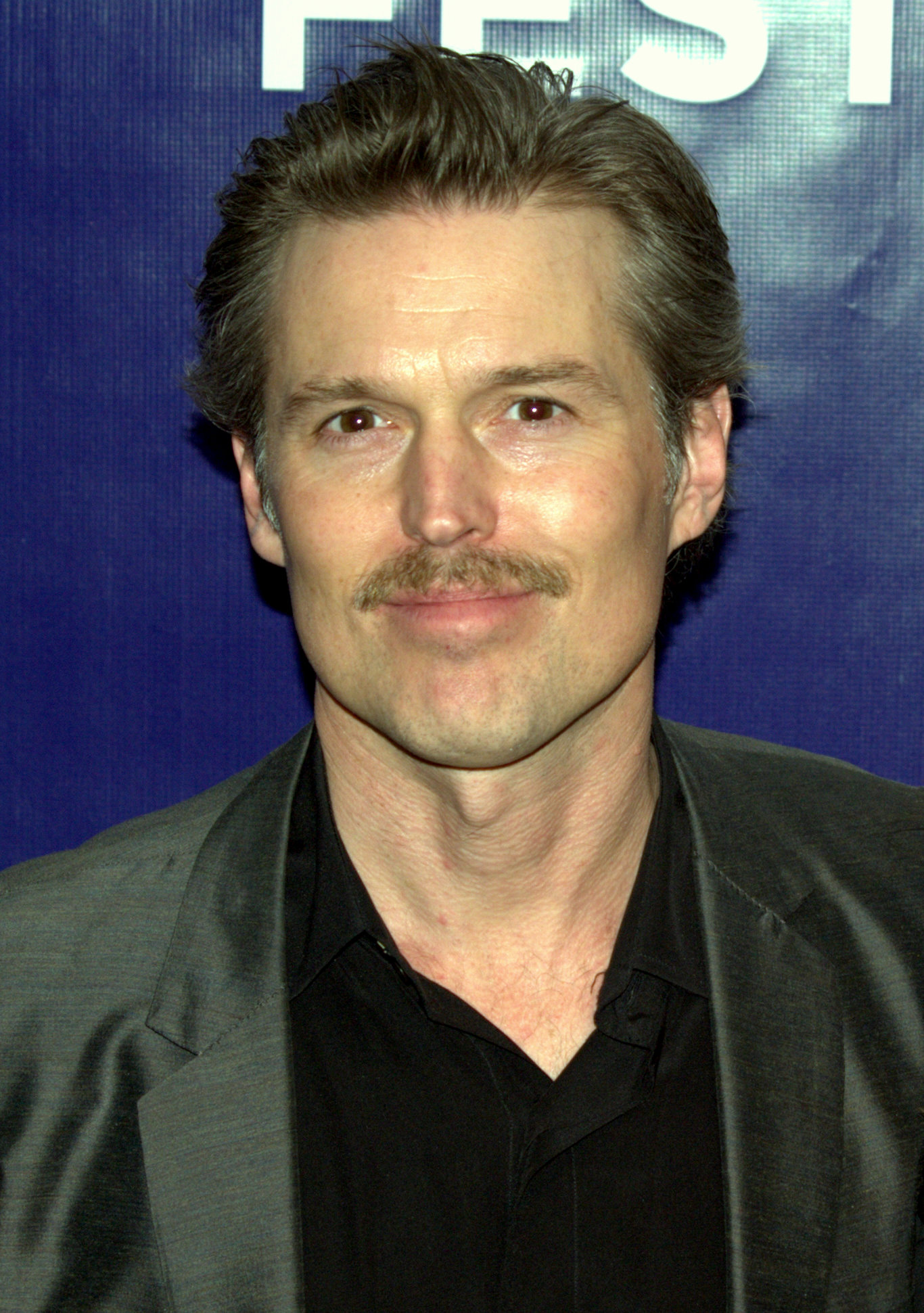
- Sage at the 2009 Tribeca Film Festival
- Born: William Sage III; April 3, 1962 (age 64); New York City, New York, U.S.
- Education: State University of New York, Purchase (BFA)
- Occupation: Actor
- Years active: 1989–present

William Sage III (born April 3, 1962) is an American actor. He is known for his collaborations with director Hal Hartley. Sage has appeared in more than 90 movies, most notably American Psycho (2000), We Are What We Are (2013), Every Secret Thing (2014), and Wrong Turn (2021).

== Early life and education ==
Sage was born and raised in New York City and graduated from the State University of New York at Purchase. Beginning in eighth grade, Sage became a victim of child sexual abuse, an experience that would later influence his performance in Mysterious Skin.

== Career ==
He made his screen debut appearing in the 1989 comedy-drama film The Unbelievable Truth written and directed by Hal Hartley. Sage later appeared in several more of Hartley's movies, such as Trust (1990), Simple Men (1992) and Flirt (1995), and other independent films. He played Tom Baker in the 1996 biographical drama film I Shot Andy Warhol directed by Mary Harron and later appeared in her psychological horror film American Psycho (2000). He received two Fangoria Chainsaw Awards nominations for performances in the horror films We Are What We Are (2013) and Wrong Turn (2021).

On television, Sage made guest-starring appearances on Sex and the City, Melrose Place, CSI: Crime Scene Investigation, Third Watch, NCIS, Law & Order, Law & Order: Special Victims Unit, Law & Order: Criminal Intent, Person of Interest, Orange Is the New Black and The Good Fight. He had recurring roles on Nurse Jackie (2010-11), Boardwalk Empire (2011), and Power (2017–18). Sage also starred in the first season of SundanceTV drama series, Hap and Leonard.

== Filmography ==
=== Film ===
Year	Title	Role	Notes
1989	The Unbelievable Truth	Gus	
1989	Sidewalk Stories	Man In Carriage	
1990	Trust	John Bill	
1991	Theory of Achievement	-	Short
1992	Ambition	-	Short
1992	Laws of Gravity	Guy's Pal	
1992	Simple Men	Dennis McCabe	
1993	Rift	Tom	
1994	Babylon: la paura è la migliore amica dell'uomo	Charles Forrester	
1994	A Counter Fancy	Thermos Man	
1995	The Perez Family	Steve Steverino	
1995	Affair Play	Mickey Davis	
1995	Flirt	Bill	
1995	Two Plus One	Mark	
1996	I Shot Andy Warhol	Tom Baker	
1996	If Lucy Fell	Dick	
1996	Boys	Officer Bill Martone	
1997	Jagd nach CM 24	Jacob Hofstetter	TV movie
1997	Cost of Living	Converse	
1998	Too Tired to Die	White Soldier	
1998	High Art	Arnie	
1998	Chainsmoker	Office Yuppie	Short
1998	Somewhere in the City	Justin	
1998	Remembering Sex	Matt Devlin	TV movie
1999	Roberta	Philip	
1999	The Insider	Intense Young Intern	
2000	American Psycho	David Van Patten	
2000	Urbania	Chuck	
2000	Double Parked	Karl Severson	
2000	Boiler Room	FBI Agent David Drew	
2001	Mourning Glory	Micahel Fanelli	
2001	No Such Thing	Carlo	
2001	Stray Dogs	Myers Carter	
2001	Glitter	Billie's Father	
2001	On the Borderline	Dean	
2001	Grownups	Chuck	
2001	The Atlantis Conspiracy	Jon	TV movie
2002	Desert Saints	FBI Agent Davis	
2002	Evenhand	Officer Ted Morning	
2002	For Earth Below	Phillip	Short
2003	The Maldonado Miracle	Lyle	TV movie
2003	Sin	Detective Cal Brody	
2004	Mysterious Skin	Coach	
2005	The Girl from Monday	Jack Bell	
2005	Shooting Vegetarians	Prosecutor	
2006	Heavens Fall	Thomas Knight Jr.	
2006	The Handyman	Caleb Tucker	Short
2007	If I Didn't Care	Davis Myers	
2007	One Night	Larry	
2008	Tennessee	Roy	
2008	The New Twenty	Robert Cameron	
2009	Precious	Mr. Wicher	
2009	Handsome Harry	Pauly	
2009	Off Season	Man	Short
2009	Stanley	Stanley	Short
2010	The Scientist	Dr. Marcus Ryan	
2010	Boy Wonder	Terry Donovan	
2011	The Green	Leo	
2011	Sweet Little Lies	Roach	
2012	Electrick Children	Tim	
2012	Surviving Family	Jerry Malone	
2012	Bad Parents	Dan	
2013	We Are What We Are	Frank Parker	
2013	Blumenthal	Interviewer	
2014	Cold in July	Baseball Announcer (voice)	
2014	Born to Race: Fast Track	Frank	Video
2014	Every Secret Thing	Dave Fuller	
2014	Ascent to Hell	Mr. Browning	
2014	Shockwave, Darkside	Dalton	
2014	Ned Rifle	Bud	
2014	Then There Was	Frank	
2015	The Boy	Sheriff Deacon Whit	
2015	Fan Girl	Mike Bovary	TV movie
2015	The Taking of Ezra Bodine	Dean	Short
2015	The Preppie Connection	Mike Hammel	
2015	The Sphere and the Labyrinth	Andrew	
2016	AWOL	Roy	
2016	Fender Bender	The Driver	
2016	Delinquent	Rich	
2016	The Archer	Bob Patrice	
2016	Welcome to Willits	Brock	
2016	Raw	Ritchie	
2017	All Summers End	Mr. Turner	
2017	The Price	John Kocher	
2018	After Everything	Paul	
2018	The Big Take	Jack Girardi	
2019	The Wave	Jonas	
2020	The Dinner Party	Carmine	
2020	The Pale Door	Dodd	
2020	The Catch	Tom McManus	
2021	Wrong Turn	Venable	
2021	Payback	Randy	
2021	April Showers	Man	Short
2022	Edward	Edward Williams	Short
2023	The Unheard	Dad	
2023	Hayseed	Leo Hobbins	
2025	Where to Land		
TBA	Drifter †	TBA	Filming

=== Television ===
Year	Title	Role	Notes
1998	Sex and the City	Kurt Harrington	Episode: "Sex and the City"
2000	The Street	-	Episode: "The Ultimatum"
2002	CSI: Crime Scene Investigation	Frank McBride	Episode: "The Hunger Artist"
2003	The Handler	Roger DuGay	Episode: "Hardcore"
2004	Third Watch	Orland	Guest Cast: Season 5-6
2004	Law & Order: Criminal Intent	Officer Tommy Callahan	Episode: "Consumed"
2005	CSI: Miami	Brad Manning	Episode: "Recoil"
2006	Numbers	Scott Winnard	Episode: "Mind Games"
2008	Cashmere Mafia	Bobby Walsh	Recurring Cast
2008	NCIS	Reed Talbot	Episode: "Capitol Offense"
2009	Law & Order	Kevin Morton	Episode: "Dignity"
2010	Law & Order: Criminal Intent	Forrest Caruso	Episode: "Traffic"
2010-2011	Nurse Jackie	Bill	Recurring Cast: Season 2-3
2011	Boardwalk Empire	Solomon Bishop	Recurring Cast: Season 2
2012	Person of Interest	Reddy	Episode: "The Contingency"
2013	White Collar	Andrew Dawson	Recurring Cast: Season 5
2014	Law & Order: Special Victims Unit	Bobby Masconi	Episode: "Jersey Breakdown"
2014	Elementary	Jake Picardo	Episode: "Corpse de Ballet"
2016	Hap and Leonard	Howard	Main Cast: Season 1
2017	Orange Is the New Black	Governor Hutchinson	Recurring Cast: Season 5
2017-2018	Power	Sammy	Recurring Cast: Season 4-5
2019	Reprisal	Jukes	Recurring Cast
2020	You Must Remember This	Larry McMurtry (voice)	Recurring Cast
2021	Magnum P.I.	Elliot Hamler	Episode: "The Big Payback"
2021	The Good Fight	Joey Battle	Episode: "And the Fight Had a Détente..."
2022	Bull	Thomas Krenell	Episode: "Family Matters"
