= Ned Rifle =

2014 film

- Film poster
- Directed by: Hal Hartley
- Screenplay by: Hal Hartley
- Produced by: Hal Hartley; Matthew Myers; Nelleke Driessen; Bruce Weiss
- Starring: Liam Aiken; Aubrey Plaza; Parker Posey; James Urbaniak; Thomas Jay Ryan; Martin Donovan; Karen Sillas; Robert John Burke; Bill Sage
- Cinematography: Vladimir Subotic
- Edited by: Kyle Gilman
- Music by: Hal Hartley
- Production company: Possible Films
- Distributed by: Fortissimo Films
- Release dates: September 7, 2014 (TIFF); April 1, 2015 (United States)
- Running time: 85 minutes
- Country: United States
- Language: English
- Budget: $395,292

Ned Rifle is a 2014 American drama film written and directed by Hal Hartley. It is the third and final film in a trilogy following characters introduced in Hartley's 1997 film Henry Fool and 2006 sequel Fay Grim. Ned Rifle stars Liam Aiken as the title character, reprising his role from the other two films, as well as Aubrey Plaza, Parker Posey, James Urbaniak, and Thomas Jay Ryan.

The film premiered at the 2014 Toronto International Film Festival on September 7, 2014. It was released in select theaters and on demand beginning on April 1, 2015.

== Plot ==
Kept in a school run on devout Christian lines, at age 18 Ned is free to leave. His mission in life is to find and kill his rogue father Henry. On visiting his mother, Fay, who is serving a life sentence for terrorism, she cannot tell him her husband's whereabouts and suggests he contacts her brother Simon, who is a writer in New York. Also anxious to see Simon is a penniless postgraduate named Susan, who wants to write about his work. Learning that his father was last heard of working in Seattle, Ned rushes off to the airport. Susan follows him, because she has her own reasons for wanting to find Henry, and Ned reluctantly teams up with her, though he keeps refusing a romance with her.

In Seattle, he learns that his father has lost his mind and is being kept in a special clinic. In fact, Henry feigns madness in order to enjoy a quiet life among good books (as Fay does too, though not by choice). Ned abducts his willing father, planning to shoot him in open country, but discovers that Susan has found his revolver and removed its ammunition. She then makes off with Ned's father, money, and gun. Reaching a motel near Spokane, she reveals that she was the 13-year-old girl whose parents burst in just as she had lured Henry to her bed. For that, he got seven years. Now they can carry on legally and their night of passion disturbs the whole motel. Ned meanwhile has traced the pair and in the morning is waiting outside for them to emerge. Susan, having completed her unfinished business with Henry, shoots him dead. Ned bursts in, and in a struggle with Susan accidentally stabs her to death. Outside, armed police are waiting for him.

== Cast ==
- Liam Aiken as Ned Rifle
- Aubrey Plaza as Susan
- Parker Posey as Fay Grim
- James Urbaniak as Simon Grim
- Thomas Jay Ryan as Henry Fool
- Martin Donovan as Rev. Daniel Gardner
- Karen Sillas as Alice Gardner
- Robert John Burke as Chet
- Melissa Bithorn as Clair Gardner
- Gia Crovatin as Olive
- Bill Sage as Bud
- Lloyd Kaufman as Zach

== Production ==
=== Development ===
Like Henry Fool (1997) and Fay Grim (2006), Ned Rifle was directed, written, co-produced and composed by Hal Hartley. While promoting Fay Grim in 2007, Hartley mentioned the possibility for a third film, hinting that Aiken's character Ned would be the story's focus. Hartley started writing Ned Rifle around 2012, and finished the script in two weeks. The film is titled after Hartley's pseudonym, Ned Rifle, the credited name that he typically uses as composer on his films. Ned Rifle was originally a character that Hartley made up for college writing assignments. For the third film, he thought it sounded like a better title than Ned Fool or Ned Grim.

The storyline is done on a smaller scale compared to Fay Grim, more in line with Henry Fool. This was done in part because of a small budget, and also because Hartley did not want to make another big-production project. He wanted the storyline to be simpler and more linear than Fay Grim. Hartley said the structure of Ned Rifle was heavily influenced by his 2011 short film Meanwhile, which chronicles a man "as he goes from one situation to the next". The character Susan and her relationship with Henry are briefly mentioned in Henry Fool. Re-watching the film over the years, Hartley regretted that the topic of this relationship was not expanded upon. While writing Ned Rifle, he felt that the story was lacking something. Upon watching Henry Fool again, he decided to incorporate Susan into the story.

In May 2013, Fortissimo Films acquired the global sales rights for the film at the 2013 Cannes Film Festival. On November 6, 2013, Hartley launched a fundraising campaign to produce the film through Kickstarter, seeking a total of $384,000 and offering various incentives to those who donated $1 or more. The main cast, as well as some crew members, appeared in several videos promoting the campaign. On November 25, Hartley added a $9,000 reward tier offering the film's distribution rights for seven years in the United States and other countries, notably the first Kickstarter to propose offering film distribution rights. Subsequently, Kickstarter notified Hartley that selling distribution rights is a form of investment, which is forbidden by Kickstarter's terms and conditions, and Hartley removed the option. The Kickstarter campaign ended on December 4, with 1,789 donors raising $395,292.

=== Casting ===
Liam Aiken, Parker Posey, James Urbaniak, and Thomas Jay Ryan reprise their roles from the first two films. In addition, Martin Donovan, Karen Sillas, Robert John Burke, and Bill Sage had worked with Hartley on his other previous films.

Casting for the character of Susan took months, with 60 to 70 women auditioning for the part, some of whom would later get other roles in the film. Gemma Arterton was reportedly attached at one point. In March 2014, it was announced that Aubrey Plaza joined the cast, playing the role of Susan. Hartley cast Plaza after seeing her prior acting performances, including Parks and Recreation. Her part in the 2012 film Safety Not Guaranteed convinced him that she would be right for the role of Susan. Plaza sought advice from Posey and Donovan to prepare for the role.

=== Filming ===
In March 2014, Hartley scouted locations in Queens, Brooklyn and the Bronx, as well as locations that could double for parts of Washington state.

Principal photography began in early April 2014, and took place entirely in New York. Filming locations included Brooklyn, Long Island City, and the SUNY Purchase campus. Urbaniak said, "Every time I revisit the character of Simon Grim I have to relearn how to be awkward and uptight". Posey shot her scenes in a day. Filming wrapped on April 26, after 22 days.

== Release ==
A teaser for Ned Rifle was released on July 22, 2014. The film premiered on September 7, 2014 at the 2014 Toronto International Film Festival. It was also screened in the Panorama section of the 65th Berlin International Film Festival on February 6, 2015. The film's US debut premiered at SXSW in Austin, Texas on March 13, 2015 and was available for viewing on demand on Hartley's official website beginning on April 1, 2015. The film was released in a limited release on the same day.

=== Critical reception ===
On review aggregator website Rotten Tomatoes, the film has an approval rating of 78% based on 32 reviews, and an average rating of 6.5/10. The website's critical consensus reads: "Ned Rifle serves as a satisfying conclusion to Hal Hartley's Henry Fool trilogy – and one of the strongest late-period works from a distinguished filmography." On Metacritic, the film has a weighted average score of 67 out of 100, based on 16 critics, indicating "generally favorable reviews".
