= Matt Malloy =

American actor and producer (born 1963)

- Born: Matthew Malloy; December 6, 1963 (age 62); Hamilton, New York, U.S.
- Education: State University of New York, Purchase (BFA)
- Occupations: Actor; producer
- Years active: 1988‒present
- Spouse: Cas Donovan

Matt Malloy (born December 6, 1963) is an American actor and producer who has appeared extensively on television, film, and radio. Malloy's break-out performance was his co-starring role alongside Aaron Eckhart and Stacy Edwards in the 1997 black comedy movie In the Company of Men, which he co-executive produced. He also co-starred in the Amazon Prime Video comedy series Alpha House as Mormon GOP Senator Louis Laffer from Nevada.

== Early life and education ==
Malloy was born in the village of Hamilton, New York. He graduated from State University of New York at Purchase. In the 2012 documentary, That Guy... Who Was in That Thing, Malloy stated that his uncle, actor Henry Gibson, inspired him to pursue an acting career.

== Career ==
In 1988, Malloy began his acting career in earnest appearing in the made-for-television movie, The Caine Mutiny Court-Martial, followed by the HBO mockumentary TV series, Tanner '88, as New York City filmmaker, Deke Conners.

In 1989, Malloy appeared in his first box office movie role as the bum Otis in The Unbelievable Truth.

Malloy has since appeared in over 100 television and movie roles and has contributed to voice-over work on radio programs like This American Life aired weekly on the Chicago, Illinois public radio station, WBEZ.

From 2013 to 2014, Malloy starred as Nevada Senator Louis Laffer in Amazon Studios's Alpha House, a political comedy written by Doonesbury creator Garry Trudeau. Along with John Goodman, Malloy played one of four Republican senators living in a house on Capitol Hill.

== Personal life ==
Malloy is married to director and producer Cas Donovan.

== Filmography ==
=== Film ===
Year	Title	Role	Notes
1989	The Unbelievable Truth	Otis	
1990	Basket Case 2	Toothy	
1990	Trust	Ed	
1992	Surviving Desire	Henry	
1992	Simple Men	Boyish Cop	
1992	My New Gun	Roy Benson	
1992	Wind	Lyle	
1994	Hand Gun	Security Guard #3	
1994	Mrs. Parker and the Vicious Circle	Marc Connelly	
1995	Across the Sea of Time	Wall Street Businessman	
1996	Boys	Bartender	
1997	In the Company of Men	Howard	
1997	The Alarmist	Morgue Technician	
1997	As Good as It Gets	Men's Store Salesman	
1998	Starstruck	William	
1998	Happiness	Doctor	
1998	The Impostors	Mike / Laertes	
1998	Armageddon	NASA Tech	
1998	Playing by Heart	Desk Clerk	Uncredited
1999	Cookie's Fortune	Eddie 'The Expert' Pitts	
1999	Election	Vice-Principal Ron Bell	
1999	Drop Dead Gorgeous	John Dough, Judge #1	
2000	Everything Put Together	Dr. Reiner	
2000	South of Heaven, West of Hell	Harvey	
2000	State and Main	Hotel Clerk	
2000	Dr. T & the Women	Bill	
2000	Finding Forrester	Bradley	
2001	The Anniversary Party	Sanford Jewison	
2001	A.I. Artificial Intelligence	Robot Repairman	
2001	Get Well Soon	Ronnie	
2002	Changing Lanes	Ron Cabot	
2002	Far from Heaven	Red Faced Man	
2003	The United States of Leland	Charlie	
2003	Elephant	Mr. Luce	
2003	Calendar Girls	Hotel Manager	
2004	Spartan	Mr. Reese	
2004	The Stepford Wives	Herb Sunderson	
2005	Hitch	Pete	
2005	Lords of Dogtown	Contest Official	
2006	Something New	Edwin	
2006	Wedding Daze	Stuart	
2007	Sunny & Share Love You	Principal Snark	
2008	Choke	Detective Foushee	
2008	Redbelt	Lawyer	
2008	Role Models	David Garvin	Uncredited
2009	Company Retreat	Bruce	
2010	The Bounty Hunter	Gary	
2010	Morning Glory	Ernie Appleby	
2011	Arthur	Spoon Guy	
2011	Jeff, Who Lives at Home	Barry	
2013	Night Moves	Boat Owner	
2014	Two-Bit Waltz	Guidance Counselor	
2016	Loving	Chet Antieau	
2017	Battle of the Sexes	Riggs' Therapist	
2017	Outside In	Russell	
2018	Sierra Burgess Is a Loser	Biology Teacher	
2022	Showing Up	Lee	

=== Television ===
Year	Title	Role	Notes
1988	The Caine Mutiny Court-Martial	Legal Assistant	TV movie
1988	Tanner '88	Deke Connors	Main cast
1991	Golden Years	Redding	Episode: "Time and Time Again"
1992–2009	Law & Order	Various roles	5 episodes
1996	Bloodhounds	Technician	TV movie
1997	Cracker	Richard Wheeler	Episode: "Madwoman"
1997	The Practice	Mr. Robinson	Episode: "The Means"
1998	Spin City	Ben	Episode: "Deaf Man Walking"
1999	NYPD Blue	Ken Jenkins	Episode: "Show & Tell"
1999	Now and Again	Civil Servant	Episode: "On the Town"
1999	Third Watch	Vincent	Episode: "History of the World"
2000	Perfect Murder, Perfect Town: JonBenét and the City of Boulder	Gary Merriman	Miniseries
2000	The Great Gatsby	Klipspringer	TV movie
2000	Early Edition	Mel Schwartz	Episode: "Mel Schwartz, Bounty Hunter"
2000	Running Mates	Aide Sam	TV movie
2000	Bette	Dr.Bidre	Episode: "Pilot"
2000	Ally McBeal	Dr.Spickett	Episode: "Two's a Crowd"
2000	Hamlet	Captain	TV movie
2001	Charmed	Dr. Griffiths	Episode: "All Hell Breaks Loose"
2001	Bad Haircut	Mr. Cerone	TV movie
2002	Star Trek: Enterprise	Grish	Episode: "Acquisition"
2002	Providence	Barrett Crouch	3 episodes
2002	Philly	Norman Foster	Episode: "Mojo Rising"
2002	The Mind of the Married Man	Edmund Niffle	2 episodes
2002	American Dreams	Mr. Healy	Episode: "Cold Snap"
2002	Touched by an Angel	Christopher Murphy	Episode: "The Christmas Watch"
2003	Tremors	Dr. Harold Baines	Episode: "Night of the Shriekers"
2003	Fargo	Norm Gunderson	TV movie
2004	Malcolm in the Middle	Mr. Sheridan	Episode: "Dewey's Special Class"
2004	Tanner on Tanner	Deke Connors	Main cast, miniseries
2004–2005	Six Feet Under	Roger Pasquese	Recurring role (Seasons 4–5)
2005	Law & Order: Special Victims Unit	Max Long	Episode: "Hooked"
2005	Warm Springs	Lionel Purdy	TV movie
2005	House	Aubrey Shifren	Episode: "Love Hurts"
2005	NCIS	Dr. George Petri	Episode: "Frame Up"
2005	Without a Trace	Sasha Nichols	Episode: "When Darkness Falls"
2006	Boston Legal	Donald Wharton	Episode: "Chitty Chitty Bang Bang"
2006	The West Wing	Herb	Episode: "Institutional Memory"
2006	Medium	Alan Gardener	Episode: "Four Dreams: Part 2"
2006	CSI: Crime Scene Investigation	Max Sullivan	Episode: "Loco Motives"
2006	Pink Collar	Marcel	Unsold ABC pilot
2006–2007	The Unit	Dr. Farris	3 episodes
2007	Lincoln Heights	Ryan Stoppler	Episode: "Spree"
2007	Raines	Stanley Rastow	Episode: "Stone Dead"
2007	Numbers	Professor Emmett Glaser	Episode: "Burn Rate"
2007	K-Ville	Sheldon Lear	Episode: "Flood, Wind, and Fire"
2008	Little Britain USA	Lewis Pincher	2 episodes
2009	Lie to Me	NASA Director Schaumburg	Episode: "A Perfect Score"
2009	Bones	Barney Reilly	Episode: "The Double Death of the Dearly Departed"
2009	Desperate Housewives	Dr. Kagan	Episode: "Rose's Turn"
2009	Hawthorne	Larry	3 episodes
2009	The Mentalist	Scott Price	Episode: "Code Red"
2010	Warren the Ape	Jerry Ranken	Episode: "Anger Management"
2011	Law & Order: LA	Attorney Limpett	Episode: "Reseda"
2011	The Good Wife	Kevin Haynes	Episode: "In Sickness"
2012	The Closer	Mr. Bateman	Episode: "Armed Response"
2013	House of Lies	Neil	Episode: "Liability"
2013	Phil Spector	Werner Spitz	TV movie
2013	Modern Family	Pat	Episode: "Games People Play"
2013	Royal Pains	Dr. Oren	3 episodes
2013–2014	Alpha House	Senator Louis Laffer, Jr.	Main cast
2015	Togetherness	Head Mixer	2 episodes
2015	Extant	Rogers	2 episodes
2015	Grandfathered	Headmaster Van Amburg	Episode: "Edie's Two Dads"
2016	Angie Tribeca	Bob Terrier	Episode: "A Coldie But a Goodie"
2017	Z: The Beginning of Everything	Harold Ober	2 episodes
2017	Halt and Catch Fire	Dr. Lebec	Episode: "Search"
2018	Lethal Weapon	Dr. Samuels	Episode: "Better Living Through Chemistry"
2018	Here and Now	Principal Schneider	4 episodes
2018	Liza on Demand	Liza on Demand	Episode: "The Phuneral"
2018	The Resident	Jake McCrary	2 episodes
2019–2020	At Home with Amy Sedaris	Leslie	Recurring role (Seasons 2–3)
2020	Perry Mason	Frank Dillon	3 episodes
2020	B Positive	Malcolm	Episode: "Joint Pain"
2021	The Blacklist	Vincent Duke	2 episodes
2021	The Sex Lives of College Girls	President Lacey	2 episodes
2022	I Love That for You	Chip Gold	Recurring role
2022	Alaska Daily	Bob Young	Main cast
2025–2026	Paradise	President Henry Baines	7 episodes

=== Video games ===
Year	Title	Role	Notes
2003	Star Trek: Elite Force II	Omag	
2009	G.I. Joe: The Rise of Cobra	M.A.R.S. Security Trooper / Black Viper	
