= Martin Donovan =

American actor (born 1957)

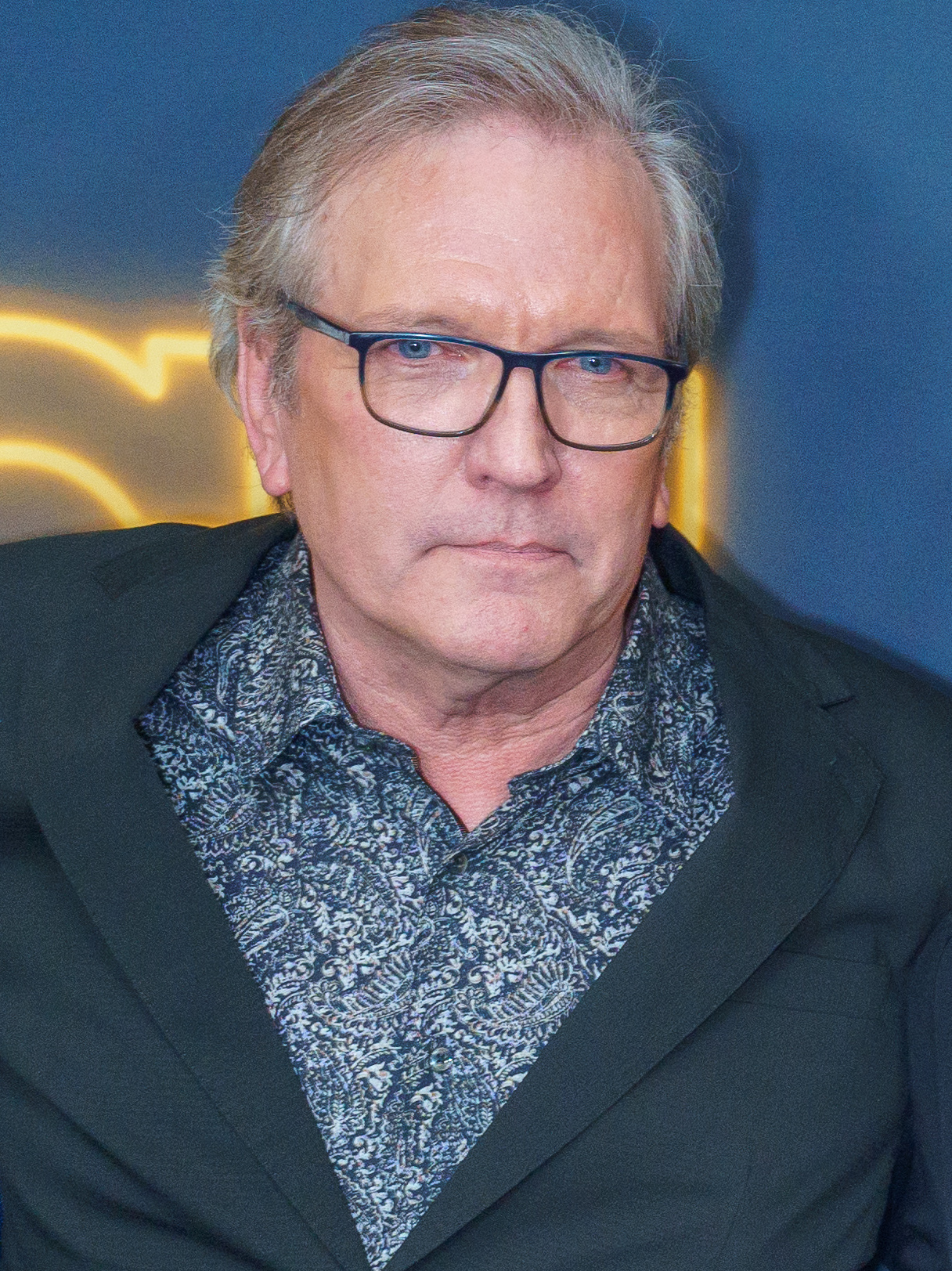
- Donovan in 2024
- Born: Martin Paul Smith; August 19, 1957 (age 69); Los Angeles, California, U.S.
- Occupation: Actor
- Years active: 1982–present
- Spouse: Vivian Lanko (m. 1984)
- Children: 2

Martin Donovan (born Martin Paul Smith; August 19, 1957) is an American actor. He has had a long collaboration with director Hal Hartley, appearing in many of his films, including Trust (1990), Surviving Desire (1991), Simple Men (1992), Amateur (1994), Flirt (1995), and The Book of Life (1998), starring as Jesus Christ in the latter. Donovan played Peter Scottson on Showtime's cable series Weeds. He made his writing/directorial debut with the film Collaborator (2011). Donovan played Detective Hap Eckhart in Christopher Nolan's psychological thriller Insomnia (2002) and the protagonist's CIA handler, Fay, in Nolan's science-fiction thriller Tenet (2020).

== Early life ==
Donovan was born Martin Paul Smith in Los Angeles, California, one of four children in an Irish Catholic family. He was raised in Reseda and graduated from Crespi Carmelite High School and attended Pierce College for two years. He attended American Theater Arts, a combined conservatory and theater company in Los Angeles, where he appeared in the plays Richard's Cork Leg by Brendan Behan and Private Life of the Master Race by Bertold Brecht. In 1983, he met his future wife, Vivian, and he moved to New York City. He joined the off-off-Broadway Cucaracha Theater on Greenwich Street.

== Career ==
Donovan had a long collaboration with director Hal Hartley, appearing in many of his films, including Trust (1990), Surviving Desire (1991), Simple Men (1992), Amateur (1994), Flirt (1995), and The Book of Life (1998), starring as Jesus Christ in the latter.

Donovan has appeared in 14 episodes of the Showtime television series Weeds, which stars Mary-Louise Parker, for which he was nominated for a SAG Award for Outstanding Performance by an Ensemble in a Comedy Series. He has also acted with Parker in Saved!, Pipe Dream, and The Portrait of a Lady. For the latter, he won the National Society of Film Critics' Award for best supporting actor.

== Personal life ==
Donovan married actress Vivian Lanko in 1984; they have two sons. They lived in New York City for many years before relocating to Vancouver.

== Filmography ==
=== Film ===
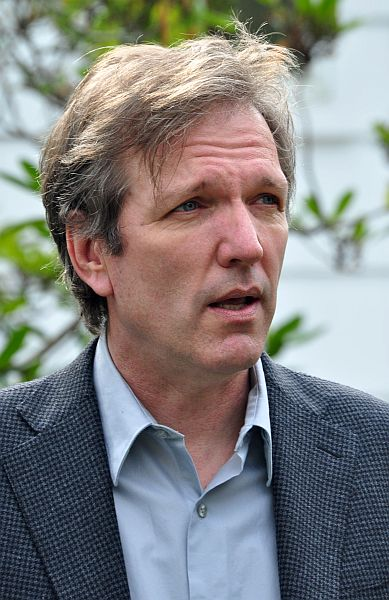
Donovan in 2011

Year	Title	Role	Notes
1985	Hard Choices	Josh	
1990	Trust	Matthew Slaughter	
1991	Surviving Desire	Jude	
1992	Malcolm X	FBI Agent	a.k.a. X (USA: poster title)
1992	Simple Men	Martin	a.k.a. Uomini semplici (Italy)
1993	Quick	Herschel Brewer	a.k.a. Crossfire (UK: video box title)
1994	The Rook	John Abbott	
1994	Nadja	Jim	
1994	Amateur	Thomas Ludens	
1995	Flirt	Walter	
1996	The Portrait of A Lady	Ralph Touchett	National Society of Film Critics Award for Best Supporting Actor; Nominated—New York Film Critics Circle Award for Best Supporting Actor(2nd place)
1996	Hollow Reed	Martyn Wyatt	
1998	The Opposite of Sex	Bill Truitt	
1998	Heaven	Robert Marling	
1998	Living Out Loud	Robert Nelson	
1998	The Book of Life	Jesus Christ	
1998	Spanish Fly	Carl	
1999	In a Savage Land	Dr. Phillip Spence	
1999	Onegin	Prince Nikitin	
2000	Desire		
2002	Insomnia	Detective Hap Eckhart	
2002	Pipe Dream	David Kulovic	
2003	The United States of Leland	Harry Pollard	
2003	Agent Cody Banks	Dr. Connors	
2004	The Pornographer: A Love Story		
2004	Saved!	Pastor Skip Wheeler	
2004	White Like Me	Gus	
2005	At Last	Mark Singleton	
2005	The Quiet	Paul Deer	
2006	The Visitation	Travis Jordan	
2006	The Garage	Adult Matt	
2006	The Sentinel	William Montrose	
2006	Day on Fire	Walter Evering	
2007	Wind Chill	Highway Patrolman	
2008	The Alphabet Killer	Jim Walsh	
2009	The Haunting in Connecticut	Peter Campbell	
2009	Duress	Richard Barnet	
2010	Shadows and Lies	Victor	
2010	Unthinkable	Jack Saunders	
2011	Collaborator	Robert Longfellow	Also writer and director Karlovy Vary International Film Festival: FIPRESCI Prize
2012	Silent Hill: Revelation 3D	Douglas Cartland	
2012	The Reluctant Fundamentalist	Ludlow Cooper	
2013	Nurse 3D	Larry Cook	
2014	Sabotage	Floyd Demel	
2014	Ned Rifle	Reverend Daniel Gardner	
2014	Inherent Vice	Crocker Fenway	
2015	Ant-Man	Mitchell Carson	
2017	Rememory	Gordon Dunn	
2017	Indian Horse	Jack Lanahan	
2018	Fahrenheit 451	Commissioner Nyari	
2019	The Art of Racing in the Rain	Maxwell	
2019	White Lie	Doug Arneson	
2019	Come to Daddy	Brian	
2020	Tenet	Fay	
2020	Percy	Rick Aarons	
2021	Redemption Day	Tom Fitzgerald	
2021	Crisis	Lawrence Morgan	
2023	BlackBerry	Rick Brock	
2024	The Apprentice	Fred Trump Sr.	

=== Television ===
Year	Title	Role	Notes
1987	At Mother's Request	Detective Rogen	Television movie
1993	Scam	Gordon Wexler	Television movie
1993	South Beach	Spencer Robinson	Episode: "School for Scandal"
1993	The Adventures of Pete & Pete		Episodes: "Apocalypse Pete" and "Space, Geeks, and Johnny Unitas"
1997	Night Sins	Paul Garrison	Television movie
1998	Rescuers: Stories of Courage - Two Couples	Aart Vos	TV movie Segment: "Aart and Johtje Vos"
1998	When Trumpets Fade	Captain Roy Pritchett	Television movie
1999	The Hunt for the Unicorn Killer	Richard DiBenedetto	Television movie
2000	The Great Gatsby	Tom Buchanan	Television movie
2000	Custody of the Heart	Dennis Raphael	Television movie
2000	Wonderland	Dr. Neil Harrison	8 episodes
2001	Amy & Isabelle	Peter Robertson	Television movie
2001–2002	Pasadena	Will McAllister	13 episodes
2002	RFK	John F. Kennedy	Television movie
2003	Law & Order: Special Victims Unit	Dr. Archibald Newlands	Episode: "Serendipity"
2003	CSI: Crime Scene Investigation	Howard Delhomme	Episode: "After the Show"
2004	Traffic	Brent Delaney	Television miniseries
2004	Dark Shadows	Roger Collins	Unaired TV pilot
2005–2006	Weeds	Peter Scottson	14 episodes Nominated—Screen Actors Guild Award for Outstanding Performance by an Ensemble in a Comedy Series (2005)
2006	Law & Order	Robert White	Episode: "Cost of Capital"
2007	The Dead Zone	Malcolm Janus	6 episodes
2007	Masters of Horror	Cliff Addison	Episode: "Right to Die"
2007	Ghost Whisperer	Tom Gordon	4 episodes
2010	Unnatural History	Bryan Bartlett	13 episodes
2011–2012	Boss	Ezra Stone	10 episodes
2012	The Firm	Kevin Stack	Recurring role
2012	The Listener	Michael Morrissey	Episode: "Cold Case Blues"
2012	The Selection	King Clarkson	Television movie
2013	King & Maxwell	Robert A. Scott	5 episodes
2013–2015	Rogue	Richard Campbell	11 episodes
2013	Homeland	Leland Bennett	3 episodes
2014	The Lottery	Darius Hayes	10 episodes
2016	Legends of Tomorrow	Zaman Druce	Recurring role 4 episodes
2017	Conviction	President Theodore Morrison	Episode: "Enemy Combatant"
2017–2018	Lethal Weapon	Grant Davenport	Episode: "Wreck the Halls" and "One Day More"
2017–2018	Beyond	Isaac Frost	5 episodes
2017	The Lost Wife of Robert Durst	Detective Struk	Television movie
2018	Electric Dreams	Odin	Episode: "Safe and Sound"
2018	Law & Order: Special Victims Unit	Captain Logan Carter	Episode: "Flight Risk"
2018	Carter	Hamilton Gerard	Episode: "The Ring"
2019	Big Little Lies	Martin Howard, Father of Bonnie	3 episodes
2019–2020	Nancy Drew	Everett Hudson	3 episodes
2020	Dead Still	Bushrod Whacker	3 episodes
2021	Firefly Lane	Wilson King	2 episodes
2022	Archive 81	Virgil Davenport	Main role
2023	Special Ops: Lioness	Errol Meade	Recurring role
2023	Sealed with a List	Silas Redmond	Television film
2024	Earth Abides	Milton	1 episode
