= Adrienne Shelly =

American actress and filmmaker (1966–2006)

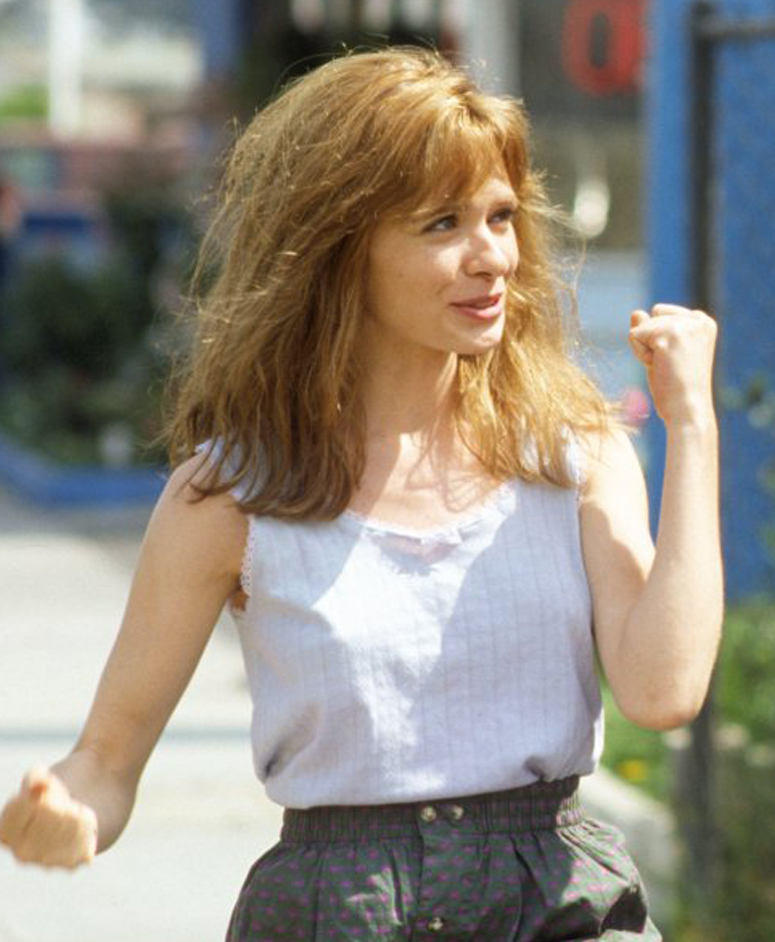
- Shelly in 1992
- Born: Adrienne Levine; June 24, 1966; Queens, New York City, U.S.
- Died: November 1, 2006 (aged 40); Manhattan, New York City, U.S.
- Cause of death: Homicide by strangulation and hanging
- Other name: Adrienne Shelley
- Occupations: Actress; director; screenwriter
- Years active: 1989–2006
- Spouse: Andy Ostroy (m. 2002)
- Children: 1

Adrienne Shelly (born Levine; June 24, 1966 – November 1, 2006) was an American actress, film director, and screenwriter. She gained recognition for her roles in independent films, particularly Hal Hartley's The Unbelievable Truth (1989) and Trust (1990). She later wrote, directed, and co-starred in Waitress (2007), which was released posthumously and later adapted into a Broadway musical.

On November 1, 2006, Shelly was found dead in her Manhattan office. Although her death was initially ruled a suicide, her husband, Andy Ostroy, pushed for further investigation. This led to the arrest of Diego Pillco, a 19-year-old construction worker, who confessed to the murder. Pillco was sentenced to 25 years in prison without parole.

Following her death, Ostroy established the Adrienne Shelly Foundation, a nonprofit dedicated to supporting women filmmakers. The foundation provides scholarships, production grants, finishing funds, and living stipends in collaboration with institutions such as NYU, Columbia University, and the Sundance Institute. One notable grant recipient, Cynthia Wade, won an Academy Award in 2008 for her documentary Freeheld, which the foundation helped fund.

Shelly's legacy is also honored by the Women Film Critics Circle, which presents the annual Adrienne Shelly Award to the film that "most passionately opposes violence against women." In 2021, Ostroy directed the HBO documentary Adrienne, which examines Shelly's life, career, and the impact of her death.

== Early life ==
Shelly was born Adrienne Levine in Queens, New York City to Jewish parents Sheldon Levine and Elaine (née Langbaum). She had two brothers and grew up on Long Island. She began performing when she was about 10 at Stagedoor Manor Performing Arts Training Center. Shelly made her professional debut in a summer stock production of the musical Annie while a student at Jericho High School in Jericho, New York. She enrolled in Boston University, majoring in film production, but dropped out after her junior year and moved to Manhattan.

== Career ==
Shelly's breakthrough came when she was cast by independent filmmaker Hal Hartley as the lead in The Unbelievable Truth (1989) and Trust (1990). Trust was nominated for the Grand Jury Prize at the Sundance Film Festival, where Hartley's script tied for the Waldo Salt Screenwriting Award. Shelly guest-starred in a number of television series including Law & Order, Oz, and Homicide: Life on the Street, and played major roles in over two dozen off-Broadway plays, often at Manhattan's Workhouse Theater. In 2005, she appeared in the film Factotum starring Matt Dillon.

During the 1990s, Shelly segued toward a career behind the camera. She wrote and directed 1999's I'll Take You There, in which she appeared alongside Ally Sheedy. She won a U.S. Comedy Arts Festival Film Discovery Jury Award in 2000 for direction of the film, and Prize of the City of Setúbal: Special Mention, at the Festróia (Tróia International Film Festival) held in Setúbal, Portugal, for best director. Her final work was writing, directing, co-set- and costume-designing, and acting in the film Waitress, starring Keri Russell and Nathan Fillion, which premiered at the 2007 Sundance Film Festival. Shelly's daughter, Sophie, has a cameo at the end of the film.

Shelly was also active in the theatre scene in New York. She wrote and directed plays for Naked Angels and Alice’s 4th floor, acted in off-Broadway shows, served as the creative director of the Missing Children Theater company for five years, taught acting at One on One Productions in Manhattan, and led a workshop at NYU in acting, directing, and writing.

== Personal life ==
Shelly, who took her professional surname from her late father's given name, was married to Andy Ostroy, the chairman and CEO of the marketing firm Belardi/Ostroy. They met in 2001 on Match.com, were married in 2002, and had a daughter, Sophie (born 2004), who was two years old at the time of her mother's death. Shelly had written the film Waitress during the time she was pregnant with her daughter. Shelly described herself as an "optimistic agnostic".

== Death and investigation ==
Shelly was found dead around 5:45 pm on November 1, 2006. Her husband, Andy Ostroy, discovered her body in the Abingdon Square apartment in Manhattan's West Village that she used as an office. Ostroy had dropped her off at 9:30 am. He became concerned that Shelly had not been in contact during the day and asked the doorman to accompany him to the apartment. They found her body hanging from a shower rod in the bathtub with a bed sheet around her neck.

Although money was missing from her wallet, the New York City Police Department believed Shelly had taken her own life. An autopsy found she had died as a result of neck compression. Ostroy insisted that his wife was happy in her personal and professional life, and would never have committed suicide leaving her two-and-a-half-year-old daughter motherless. His protests over the following days prompted further examination of the bathroom, which revealed a sneaker print in gypsum dust on the toilet beside where her body had been found. The print was matched to other shoe prints in the building where construction work had been done the day of Shelly's death.

Diego Pillco, a 19-year-old construction worker from Ecuador, was arrested on November 6 and confessed on tape to attacking Shelly and staging the fake suicide. Pillco's original version claimed that when Shelly demanded the construction noise be kept down, he threw a hammer at her. Afraid she might make a complaint that could result in his deportation, since he had immigrated into the United States illegally, he followed her back to her apartment. Pillco said Shelly slapped him when he grabbed her at her apartment door, and he retaliated by punching her in the face, knocking her to the floor, where she hit her head and fell unconscious. Believing he had killed her, he then hanged her to make it appear a suicide. This version of events was not supported given the lack of head trauma and the presence of neck compression as the cause of death.

Pillco gave a different account during trial in 2008. He said he was returning to work after lunch when he noticed Shelly returning to her apartment in the elevator, and decided to follow and rob her. He said he waited on the landing of Shelly's apartment as she entered and left the door open, and intended to steal from her purse. When Shelly caught him and threatened to call police, he grabbed the phone and covered her mouth to quiet her screaming. After rendering Shelly unconscious, Pillco bound a bed sheet around her neck and strangled her. He then dragged her to the bathroom, where he hanged her body from the shower rod to make her death look like suicide.

The second version was consistent with the lack of dust on Shelly's shoes that she was not wearing when found and was apparently a confession to murder. Prosecutors thought if charged with murder, Pillco might return to his original account and a jury trial could find him guilty of a lesser charge. The medical examiner determined that Shelly was still alive when hanged. Pillco pleaded guilty to first-degree manslaughter and was sentenced to 25 years in prison without parole. He is scheduled to be deported to Ecuador upon release.

At Pillco's sentencing on March 13, 2008, Shelly's husband and family members said that they would never forgive him. Andy Ostroy said of Pillco, "...you are nothing more than a cold-blooded killer" and that he hoped he would "rot in jail".

Ostroy said, "Adrienne was the kindest, warmest, most loving, generous person I knew. She was incredibly smart, funny, and talented, a bright light with an infectious laugh and huge smile that radiated inner and outer beauty ... she was my best friend, and the person with whom I was supposed to grow old."

=== Lawsuit ===
According to an acquaintance, Pillco said after eight months, he still owed a debt on the $12,000 he had paid to be smuggled into the US, and he lived in the basement of a building owned by his employer. One of Shelly's neighbors told reporters that Pillco's stare had made the neighbor feel uncomfortable when she walked past him. Shelly's husband sued contractor Bradford General Contractors, which had hired Pillco. The complaint alleged that Shelly would still be alive if the contracting firm had not hired him.

Ostroy also sought to hold the owners and management of the building liable for Shelly's murder. According to a New York Post article, among other allegations, the complaint stated, "'Pillco was an undocumented immigrant...' as were his co-workers, and "it was in Bradford General Contractors' interest not to have 'police and immigration officials [called] to the job site' because that would have ground their work to a halt".

On July 7, 2011, the lawsuit was dismissed by Judge Louis York. The court determined that Ostroy had not established legal grounds to hold the contractor liable, writing, "While this court sympathizes with [Ostroy's] loss, plaintiffs have not presented sufficient legal grounds upon which to hold Bradford ... liable for Pillco's vicious crime," and that there was likewise insufficient evidence presented to find that either the building's management agents or its owners "had reason to believe that Pillco was a dangerous person who should not have been allowed to work at the premises" in order to find them vicariously liable. Ostroy was said to be considering an appeal.

== Legacy ==
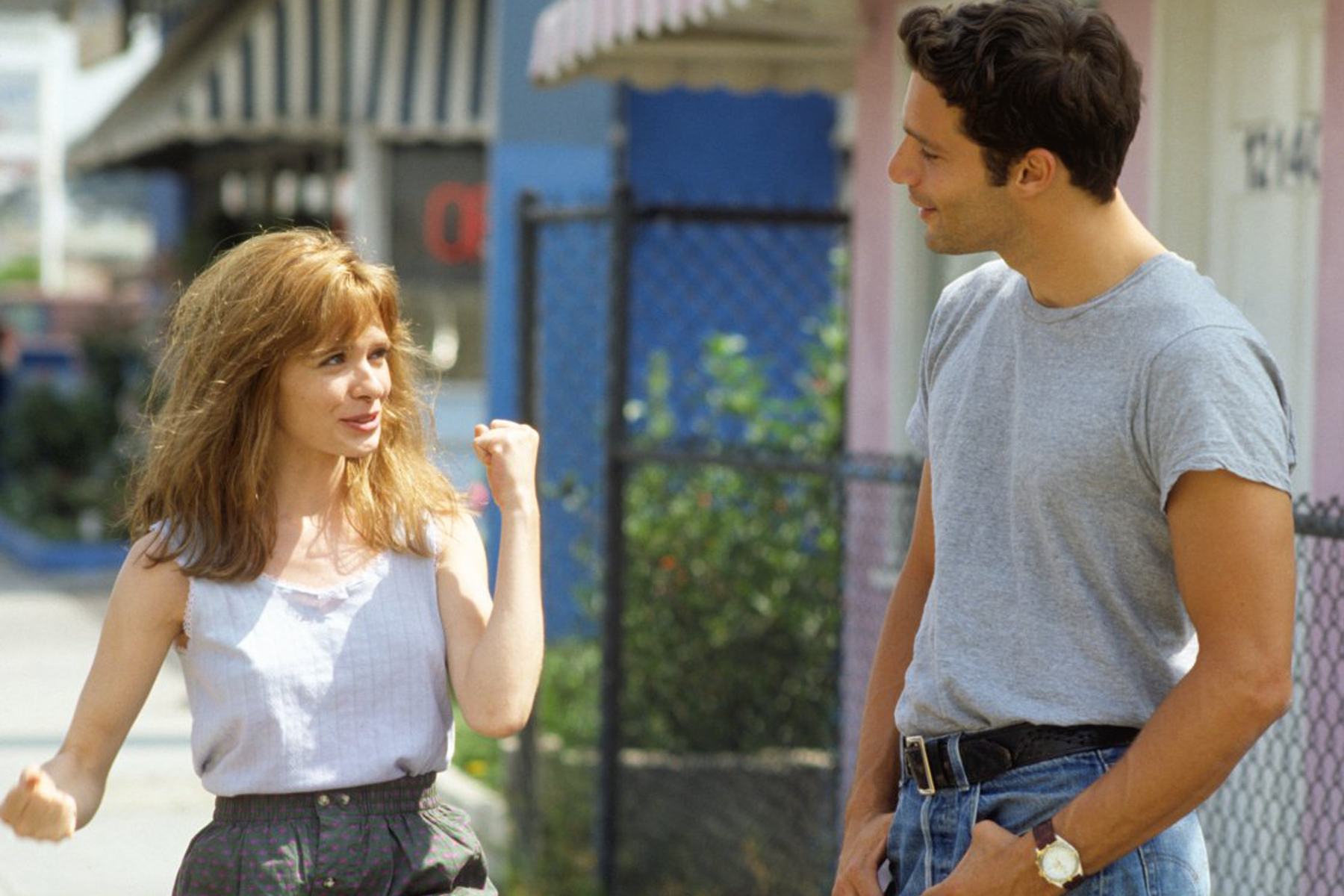
Shelly in 1992 on the set of Hold Me, Thrill Me, Kiss Me with Max Parrish

After his wife's death, Ostroy established the Adrienne Shelly Foundation, a nonprofit organization that awards scholarships, production grants, finishing funds, and living stipends through its partnerships with academic and filmmaking institutions NYU, Columbia University, Women in Film, IFP, AFI, Sundance Institute, Tribeca Film Institute, and the Nantucket Film Festival. One of its grant recipients, Cynthia Wade, won an Academy Award in 2008 for Freeheld, a short-subject documentary that the Foundation had helped fund. The foundation gave an early short film grant to Chloé Zhao, who eight years later became the second woman to win the Academy Award for Best Director. As part of its annual awards, the Women Film Critics Circle gives the Adrienne Shelly Award to the film that "most passionately opposes violence against women".

On February 16, 2007, the NBC crime drama series Law & Order broadcast a season-17 episode titled "Melting Pot", which was a loose dramatization of Shelly's murder. The plot of "Melting Pot" contains an alteration of the events wherein the murder is committed by the employer of the undocumented construction worker in an attempt to protect his lucrative business. Shelly also guest-starred on the show in the 2000 episode "High & Low".

Shelly's film Waitress was accepted into the 2007 Sundance Film Festival before her murder. The film, starring Keri Russell, Nathan Fillion, Cheryl Hines, Jeremy Sisto, Andy Griffith, and Shelly was bought during the festival by Fox Searchlight Pictures for an amount between $4 million and $5 million (news accounts on the actual amount vary), and the film realized a final box-office draw of more than $19 million. Waitress maintains a 90% "fresh" rating on Rotten Tomatoes.

Waitress and its cast have collectively won five film awards and received other nominations in various categories, including an audience award for a feature film at the Newport Beach Film Festival, where cast member Nathan Fillion received a feature film award for his role in the film, the Jury Prize at the Sarasota Film Festival for narrative feature, and the Wyatt Award by the Southeastern Film Critics Association Awards, as well as nominations for a Humanitas Prize and an Independent Spirit Award for best screenplay.

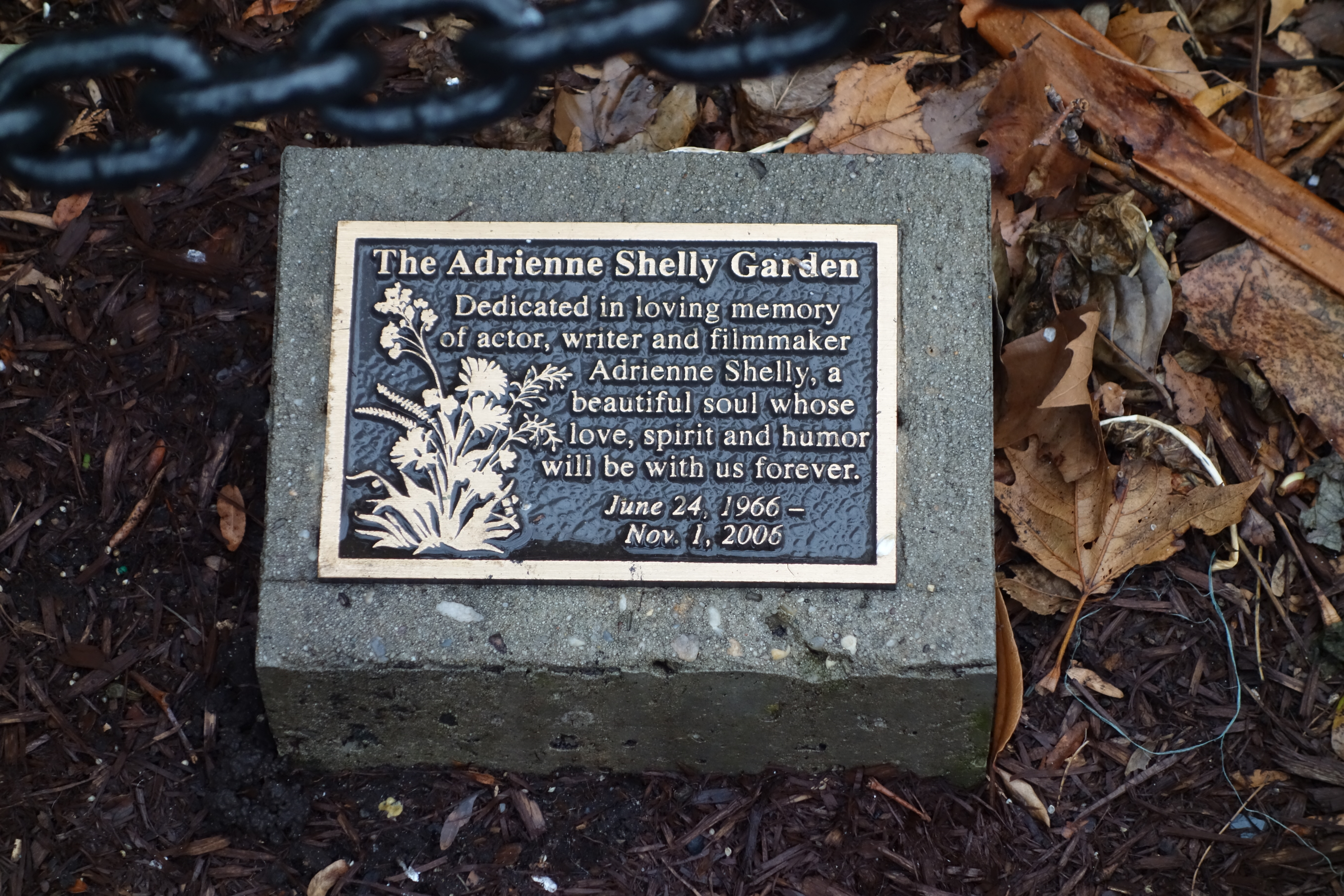
A commemorative plaque at the Adrienne Shelly Garden at Abingdon Square Park

Ostroy produced Serious Moonlight, a film written by Shelly and directed by Hines. The film stars Meg Ryan, Timothy Hutton, Kristen Bell, and Justin Long. It premiered at the Tribeca Film Festival in April 2009 and was released that December.

Ostroy spearheaded the establishment of a memorial to his wife. On August 3, 2009, the Adrienne Shelly Garden was dedicated on the southeast side of Abingdon Square Park at 8th Avenue and West 12th Street. It faces 15 Abingdon Square, the building where Shelly died.

The musical Waitress, based on the motion picture written by Shelly, opened on August 1, 2015, at the American Repertory Theater, which is at Harvard University. It was directed by Diane Paulus and featured a book by Jessie Nelson and music and lyrics by Sara Bareilles. It starred Jessie Mueller, winner of a Tony Award for her portrayal of Carole King in the musical Beautiful. After a sold-out limited engagement, the show moved to Broadway, starting in previews March 25, 2016, and officially opening April 24, 2016. The production closed on January 5, 2020, after 33 previews and 1,544 performances.

Shelly's murder and police investigation are dramatized in season four, episode two of the Investigation Discovery television series, The Perfect Murder. She is portrayed by actress Emily Stokes. The murder is also dramatized in season two, episode 15 of the Oxygen television series, New York Homicide.

Ostroy directed a documentary about Shelly's life, titled Adrienne, in which he meets and has a conversation with Diego Pillco in prison. It premiered on December 1, 2021, on HBO.

== Filmography ==
Acting
Year	Title	Role	Notes
1989	The Unbelievable Truth	Audry	
1990	Trust	Maria Coughlin	
1990	Lonely in America	Woman in Laundromat	
1992	Big Girls Don't Cry... They Get Even	Stephanie	
1992	Hold Me, Thrill Me, Kiss Me	Dannie	
1993	Hexed	Gloria O'Connor	
1994	Opera No. 1	Fairy #2	Short film
1994	Kalamazoo		Short film
1994	Sleeping with Strangers	Jenny	
1994	Homicide: Life on the Street	Tanya Quinn	Episode: "A Many Splendored Thing"
1994	Teresa's Tattoo	Teresa / Gloria	
1994	The Road Killers	Red	
1994	Sleep with Me	Pamela	
1996	Sudden Manhattan	Donna	Writer and director
1997	The Regulars		Short film
1997	Grind	Janey	
1997	Early Edition	Emma Shaw	Episode: "Phantom at the Opera"
1998	Oz	Sarah	Episode: "Ancient Tribes"
1998	Wrestling with Alligators	Mary	
1999	I'll Take You There	Lucy	Writer and director Festroia International Film Festival Prize of the City of Setúbal – Special Mention; The Comedy Festival Film Discovery Jury Award for Best Director
2000	Dead Dog	Mrs. Marquet	
2000	Law & Order	Wendy Alston	Episode: "High & Low"
2000	The Shadows of Bob and Zelda	Zelda	Short film
2001	The Atlantis Conspiracy	Samantha	TV movie
2001	Revolution #9	Kim Kelly	
2004	Tiger: His Fall & Rise	Terry	Short film
2005	Factotum	Jerry	
2007	Waitress	Dawn	Posthumous release Final film appearance Writer, director, and co-star Sarasota Film Festival Jury Prize for Best Narrative Feature; Nominated — Humanitas Prize for Sundance Film Category; Nominated — Independent Spirit Award for Best Screenplay
2021	Adrienne	Herself	Documentary about Shelly

Writer and Director
Year	Title	Role	Notes
1994	Urban Legend	Writer & Director	26-minute short film
1997	Lois Lives a Little	Writer & Director	
1997	Sudden Manhattan	Writer & Director	
2000	The Shadows of Bob and Zelda	Writer & Director	
2009	Serious Moonlight	Writer	
