= Fay Grim =

- Promotional one-sheet
- Directed by: Hal Hartley
- Written by: Hal Hartley
- Produced by: Hal Hartley; Jason Kilot; Joana Vicente
- Starring: Parker Posey; James Urbaniak; Liam Aiken; Jeff Goldblum
- Cinematography: Sarah Cawley
- Edited by: Hal Hartley
- Music by: Hal Hartley
- Distributed by: Magnolia Pictures
- Release dates: September 11, 2006 (TIFF); May 18, 2007 (United States)
- Running time: 118 minutes
- Countries: United States; Germany
- Language: English

Fay Grim is a 2006 espionage thriller film written and directed by Hal Hartley. The film is a sequel to Hartley's 1997 film Henry Fool, and revolves around the title character, played by Parker Posey, the sister of Simon Grim (James Urbaniak). The plot revolves around Fay's attempt to unravel an increasingly violent mystery in Europe.

Hartley began writing the script in 2002, and filming took place in Europe from January to March 2006. It premiered in September at the 2006 Toronto International Film Festival, and received a theatrical release in the United States on May 18, 2007. The film was shot almost entirely in Dutch angles, meaning the vast majority of shots are framed diagonally, or "tilted". At the 2007 Sundance Film Festival, Hartley revealed that the two shots in the film's final cut that are not "Dutched" occurred when he and the film crew forgot to tilt the camera.

A sequel, Ned Rifle, was released in 2014.

== Plot ==
Seven years after the events of Henry Fool, Fay Grim (Parker Posey) is contacted by a CIA agent (Jeff Goldblum) who, believing her husband Henry (Thomas Jay Ryan) to be deceased, coerces her to try to locate Henry's confession notebooks. Fay is launched into a world of espionage as she travels to Paris to retrieve some of the journals, each having mysteriously appeared in the hands of the most unlikely of people. Simon Grim, Fay's brother and Nobel Prize–winning poet, remains home with his sister's son, the CIA agent, and his publisher.

Fay is surrounded by competing agents all vying for her help in retrieving the notebooks. She and Simon start receiving clues to what the unpublished confession is about and why the CIA believes it contains information that could compromise U.S. security. A former air hostess befriends and aids Fay, revealing she was similarly touched by Henry's chaotic influence. The film culminates in a tense meeting with a notorious terrorist and friend of Henry, where she has to make the biggest decision of her life.

== Cast ==
- Parker Posey as Fay Grim
- James Urbaniak as Simon Grim
- Liam Aiken as Ned Grim
- Jeff Goldblum as Agent Fulbright
- Chuck Montgomery as Angus James
- D.J. Mendel as Father Lang
- Leo Fitzpatrick as Carl Fogg
- Saffron Burrows as Juliet
- Jasmin Tabatabai as Milla
- Elina Löwensohn as Bebe
- Thomas Jay Ryan as Henry Fool
- Anatole Taubman as Jallal
- Nikolai Kinski as Amin
- Peter Benedict as Raul Picard
- Miho Nikaido as Gnoc Deng
- Megan Gay as Principal
- John Keogh as Prosecutor
- Mehdi Nebbou as Islamic Cleric
- Claudia Michelsen as Judge
- David Scheller as Convict Husband
- Sibel Kekilli as Concierge Istanbul Hotel

== Production ==
Fay Grim, like its predecessor Henry Fool (1997), was directed, written, co-produced and composed by Hal Hartley. Plans for a Henry Fool sequel went back to 1994, when Hartley made a note to himself that the film would be the first in a series. During production of the first film, Hartley joked about making sequels but had no serious plans to do so. A few years after the release of Henry Fool, Hartley began to reconsider the idea of a sequel. When asked by Hartley in April 2002, Parker Posey said she wanted to reprise her role as Fay Grim, prompting Hartley to begin writing the script that year. Although Posey had a smaller role in the first film, Hartley was impressed with her acting and had always intended for the sequel to focus on her character. Reassembling other returning cast members was easy according to Hartley, as the project had been in discussion for years.

Hartley said that Fay Grim was inspired by current world events and the world around him, particularly after the September 11 attacks and the awareness that it raised about terrorism and espionage. He said he wanted to "pull the characters in this direction – into an international espionage farce – because the world was feeling crazy, mixed-up, and very dangerous". He envisioned Fay as "the representative American of a certain type: well-intentioned but ill-informed. This is a story of her getting tossed into the wider world, and hearing and learning about all the complexity at a political level. And she's sort of being a stand-in for people like me -- as hard as I try to understand everything, I never trust that I have a real good grip on it". Hartley read the 2003 mystery thriller novel The Da Vinci Code twice while writing the script as he "wanted to make good on all the genre expectations".

Fay Grim was produced for $2 million, an increase from the $900,000 budget of its predecessor. Executive producer Ted Hope, a longtime collaborator of Hartley's, contacted his friends Joana Vicente and Jason Kilot to produce the film and finance its budget, which included global travel and stunts. The project was announced during the 2005 Toronto International Film Festival. Filming began in Europe in mid-January 2006, and concluded by the end of March. The primary filming location was Berlin, where Hartley had lived since 2004. A number of locations in Berlin stood in for New York, as filming in the actual state was deemed too expensive. Other filming locations included Paris and Istanbul, with some exterior pick-up shots in New York City. It was the first film that Hartley shot in high definition.

== Release ==
Fay Grim premiered at the 2006 Toronto International Film Festival, and was released in theaters across America on May 18, 2007, with a DVD release the following Tuesday, May 22, in conjunction with Magnolia Pictures' "day-and-date" release strategy.

== Reception ==
=== Critical reception ===
On review aggregator website Rotten Tomatoes, the film has an approval rating of 46% based on 90 reviews, and an average rating of 5.4/10. The website's critical consensus reads, "Fay Grim is too concerned with its own farcical premise to present a coherent, involving story." On Metacritic, the film has a weighted average score of 52 out of 100, based on 26 critics, indicating "generally favorable" reviews.

=== Accolades ===
The film won the "Audience Choice Award" at the RiverRun International Film Festival in 2007.
