= Surviving Desire =

- DVD cover
- Directed by: Hal Hartley
- Written by: Hal Hartley
- Produced by: Jerome Brownstein; Ted Hope
- Starring: Martin Donovan; Julie Kessler; Matt Malloy; Merritt Nelson; Mary B. Ward
- Cinematography: Michael Spiller
- Edited by: Hal Hartley
- Music by: The Great Outdoors, Hal Hartley (as Ned Rifle)
- Distributed by: Wellspring Media (DVD)
- Release date: 1991
- Running time: 53 minutes
- Country: United States
- Language: English

Surviving Desire is a 1991 American comedy-drama film written and directed by Hal Hartley and starring Martin Donovan, Julie Kessler, Matt Malloy, Merritt Nelson, and Mary B. Ward.

== Plot ==
College professor Jude (Donovan) becomes smitten with a student named Sofie (Ward). The two enjoy a brief time together, only to find that numerous obstacles, both tangible and intangible, prevent them from moving forward. Their conflict begins to expose parallels with the themes Jude covers in his literature class.

== Cast ==
- Martin Donovan as Jude
- Matt Malloy as Henry
- Rebecca Nelson as Katie
- Julie Kessler as Jill (as Julie Sukman)
- Mary B. Ward as Sofie

== See also ==
Surviving Desire is generally distributed with two other short films by Hartley, Theory of Achievement and Ambition.
