= The Unbelievable Truth (film) =

1989 film by Hal Hartley

- Poster
- Directed by: Hal Hartley
- Written by: Hal Hartley
- Produced by: Hal Hartley; Bruce Weiss; Jerome Brownstein
- Starring: Adrienne Shelly; Robert Burke; Christopher Cooke; Julia McNeal; Gary Sauer; Mark Bailey; David Healy; Katherine Mayfield; Edie Falco; Matt Malloy
- Cinematography: Michael Spiller
- Edited by: Hal Hartley
- Music by: Jim Coleman
- Production companies: Possible Films; Action Features
- Distributed by: Miramax Films
- Release dates: May 15, 1989 (Cannes Film Market); July 20, 1990
- Running time: 90 minutes
- Country: United States
- Language: English
- Budget: $75,000 (est.)
- Box office: $546,541

The Unbelievable Truth is a 1989 American comedy-drama film written and directed by Hal Hartley and starring Adrienne Shelly in her film debut, Robert Burke, Christopher Cooke, Julia McNeal, Gary Sauer, Mark Bailey, David Healy, Katherine Mayfield, Edie Falco and Matt Malloy. It tells the story of Audry, who dumps her high-school boyfriend and becomes a successful fashion model, but all along is in love with a mysterious man called Josh, released after conviction for manslaughter. He, after his experiences, is uncomfortable with relationships, but learns that he cannot stay an observer of life and must fight to win her. The film was nominated for a Grand Jury Prize in 1990 at the Sundance Film Festival. Along with Trust (1990) and Simple Men (1992), it is part of the "Long Island trilogy."

== Plot ==
Back from prison to a small community on Long Island comes Josh, a sober young man whose crimes most cannot remember exactly and finds a job at Vic's auto repair shop. Vic's daughter Audry falls instantly in love with him, only to be rejected when she declares her feelings because he is not ready for such a relationship and fears Vic's reaction. In revenge, she gives up the place she has won at Harvard and goes off to New York to be a photographic model, appearing first in lingerie and then nude.

Horrified, her parents send the reliable Josh off to the city to reclaim her, but he gives up in disgust when he finds she is living with her agent. Returning home, he meets the daughter of the man he is supposed to have killed in a struggle, who says she can testify that he is innocent. Audry, overjoyed that Josh has re-entered her life, gives her money-obsessed father all her earnings from modeling and again offers herself to Josh, who this time is overjoyed too.

== Cast ==
- Adrienne Shelly as Audry Hugo
- Robert Burke as Joshua "Josh" Hutton
- Christopher Cooke as Vic Hugo
- Julia McNeal as Pearl
- Katherine Mayfield as Liz Hugo
- Gary Sauer as Emmet
- Mark Bailey as Mike
- David Healy as Todd Whitbread
- Matt Malloy as Otis
- Edie Falco as Jane
- Paul Schultze as Bill
- Bill Sage as Gus

== Production ==
For the making of this film, his feature directorial debut, Hal Hartley said he was influenced by European art films, particularly those of Jean-Luc Godard, as well as by Howard Hawks and Preston Sturges.

== Reception ==
The Unbelievable Truth received critical acclaim. On Rotten Tomatoes, it has a 100% rating based on reviews from 11 critics. On Metacritic, it has a score of 67 out of 100. Roger Ebert of the Chicago Sun-Times gave the film three out of four stars.

=== Box office ===
The film grossed $546,541 on a budget of an estimated $75,000.

== Home video ==
The region 1 DVD was released by Anchor Bay Entertainment on March 11, 2001, but it has been discontinued. The DVD contained the film's trailer and an interview with Hartley. Possible Films, Hal Hartley's company, released a 20th Anniversary DVD on October 19, 2010. Olive Films released the film on Blu-ray and DVD on May 14, 2013.
