= Karen Sillas =

American stage and film actress (born 1963)

- Born: New York City, Brooklyn, New York U.S.
- Occupation: Actress
- Known for: Under Suspicion; Simple Men

Karen Sillas (/ˈsɪləs/) is an American stage, film and television actress.

== Early life ==
The daughter of a Greek father and a Swedish mother, Sillas was born in Brooklyn.

== Career ==
Sillas appeared in Hal Hartley's 1992 film Simple Men. In 1994, she starred in What Happened Was... which won the Grand Jury Prize at the Sundance Film Festival.

In CBS's critically acclaimed detective series Under Suspicion, Sillas portrayed Rose Phillips, the only female detective in an otherwise male-dominated squad room.

Sillas and Tom Noonan appeared in a virtual interview conducted by the film critic Sheila O'Malley, hosted by Film Forum, February 9, 2021, discussing the re-release of the digitized version of What Happened Was on Film Forum's YouTube channel.

== Filmography ==
=== Film ===
Year	Title	Role	Notes
1984	Kid	Patsy	Short film
1987	The Cartographer's Girlfriend		Short film
1990	Trust	Nurse Paine	
1991	Liebestraum	Nurse #3	
1992	Simple Men	Kate	
1994	What Happened Was...	Jackie Marsh	
1994	Risk	Maya	
1995	Flirt	Doctor Clint	
1996	Female Perversions	Renee	
1998	Sour Grapes	Joan	
1998	Reach the Rock	Donna	
1999	Bad Money	Jan Wells	
2014	Ned Rifle	Alice Gardner	
2015	Stuff	Trish Murdoch	
2021	T11 Incomplete	Kate Murphy	

=== Television ===
Year	Title	Role	Notes
1990	True Blue	Sheila Maggio	Episode: "Fire Down Below"
1990	Monsters	Ellen	Episode: "Bug House"
1994	Law & Order	Cynthia Thomas	Episode 16: "Big Bang"
1994–1995	Under Suspicion	Detective Rose Phillips	Lead character, 18 episodes
1996	The Beast	Lt. Kathryn Marcus	TV movie
1997	Night Sins	Dr. Hannah Garrison	TV movie
1997	Lies He Told	Alyson Haywood	TV movie
1999	When Time Runs Out	Detective Janet Wise	TV Movie
1999	The Sopranos	Debbie	Episode: "Nobody Knows Anything"
2003	CSI Miami	Belle King	Episode: "Dead Woman Walking"
2004	Without a Trace	Martha Stanley	Episode: "Legacy"
2004	Law & Order: Criminal Intent	Beth Landau	Episode: "Consumed"
2005	Wanted	Mariah Belichek	8 episodes
