= No Such Thing (film) =

2001 film by Hal Hartley

No Such Thing Skrímsli
- Theatrical release poster
- Directed by: Hal Hartley
- Written by: Hal Hartley
- Produced by: Hal Hartley; Fridrik Thor Fridriksson; Cecilia Kate Roque
- Starring: Sarah Polley; Robert John Burke; Helen Mirren; Julie Christie
- Cinematography: Michael Spiller
- Edited by: Steve Hamilton
- Music by: Hal Hartley
- Production companies: United Artists; American Zoetrope; Icelandic Film Corporation
- Distributed by: MGM Distribution Co.
- Release dates: May 2001 (Cannes); March 29, 2002 (United States); November 15, 2002 (Iceland)
- Running time: 102 minutes
- Countries: United States; Iceland
- Languages: English; Icelandic
- Budget: $5 million
- Box office: $62,703

No Such Thing (previously titled Monster, Icelandic: Skrímsli) is a 2001 supernatural drama film directed by Hal Hartley. It tells the story of Beatrice (Sarah Polley), a journalist whose fiancé is killed by a monster in Iceland. The story is based very loosely on the Anglo-Saxon epic Beowulf. It was screened in the Un Certain Regard section at the May 2001 Cannes Film Festival.

== Plot ==
Beatrice (Sarah Polley) is a young woman working in a television network under a woman known only as The Boss (Helen Mirren). She receives a recording from her fiancé Jim, who has been sent as part of a small production crew to Iceland to investigate a Monster that lives there. Determined to find her fiancé, Beatrice convinces her boss to send her to Iceland, but her plane crashes. She is the only survivor and, in order to walk again, undergoes an extremely painful, radical surgery. As she recovers, she befriends Dr. Anna (Julie Christie), who helps her travel to the remote village where the monster lives.

After cajoling Beatrice into drinking herself into unconsciousness, the villagers strip her and leave her as an offering to the Monster himself (Robert John Burke), a foul-mouthed, alcoholic beast old enough to remember human ancestors crawling from the seas. Beatrice shows him no real fear, although the Monster tells her he has killed her friends and might kill her, too. He tells her that he wants to die, but is indestructible. In an effort to force Beatrice to try to kill him, he proves that he killed Jim and his crew. She shoots him twice and he reacts in obvious pain, but heals almost instantly. He tells her of a mad scientist, Dr. Artaud (Baltasar Kormákur, presumably named for Antonin Artaud), who had discovered a way to kill him, but Dr. Artaud had been "taken away in a straitjacket." Beatrice offers to help him find Dr. Artaud if the Monster comes with her to New York and promises not to kill anyone while he is there.

In New York, the Monster becomes a celebrity, with the Boss staging a media frenzy as they search for Dr. Artaud. They find that he is working for the government. While Beatrice revels in the attention, the Monster remains miserable and drunk. The Boss makes a deal with a government scientist to study the Monster and he's rushed away by army guards who mislead him into believing he is going to see Dr. Artaud. Instead, he is subjected to torturous experiments as the scientists try to discover the key to his indestructibility, one of them noting that he can't seem to tolerate new information. One of those experiments involves the Monster being ridiculed and beaten on the street to study his behavior. The Monster holds to his promise to Beatrice and does not kill anyone.

Meanwhile, Beatrice meets Dr. Artaud by chance. With Margaret (Annika Peterson), a remorseful former coworker of Beatrice's, they hatch a plan to escape back to Iceland with the Monster. They make their escape but are pursued by the government, who fears the Monster and Artaud might fall into the wrong hands. Artaud builds a machine that will kill the Monster. Beatrice bids the Monster a tearful farewell and kisses him goodbye. As the machine starts, the army storms their hideout. As the lights flicker on and off and the machine moves the Monster into place (in a process mirroring Beatrice's surgery), the Monster and Beatrice face each other one last time. Her face flickers in his vision for several minutes before the screen blackens.

== Cast ==
- Sarah Polley as Beatrice
- Robert John Burke as Monster
- Helen Mirren as The Boss
- Julie Christie as Dr. Anna
- Baltasar Kormákur as Dr. Artaud
- Annika Peterson as Margaret
- Erica Gimpel as Judy

== Production ==
For Hartley, writing and directing No Such Thing was like coming "full circle for a filmmaker": early in his career he had written a script for a horror film, later revised to be a vampire film; that movie was never made, but No Such Thing mirrors its ideas. It was shot in Iceland and New York City during September and October 2000. It was the first Hartley production for a major company, MGM/United Artists, and Francis Ford Coppola was one of the executive producers. The film was ill-received at the Cannes Film Festival, after which the studio demanded the movie be recut. Hartley refused, and Coppola supported him. These events, and the September 11 attacks, complicated the relation with the studio. The release, in early 2002, was a low-key affair; after two weeks, only three screens showed the film. It went to home video within months.

In 2012, the film's screenplay was made available on Hal Hartley's website in a book that also included the screenplays for The Book of Life and The Girl From Monday.

== Critical reception ==
No Such Thing was poorly received by critics. On Rotten Tomatoes, the film holds an approval rating of 33% based on 43 reviews with an average rating of 5.03/10. The website's critics consensus reads: "Stocked with talented stars but lacking any clear idea of what to do with them, No Such Thing is ultimately far too uneven to recommend." According to Metacritic, which sampled 21 critics and calculated a weighted average score of 36 out of 100, the film received "generally unfavorable reviews".

Film critic Roger Ebert gave the film one star, saying "No Such Thing is inexplicable, shapeless, dull. It doesn't even rise to entertaining badness."
