= Hal Hartley =

American film director and screenwriter (born 1959)

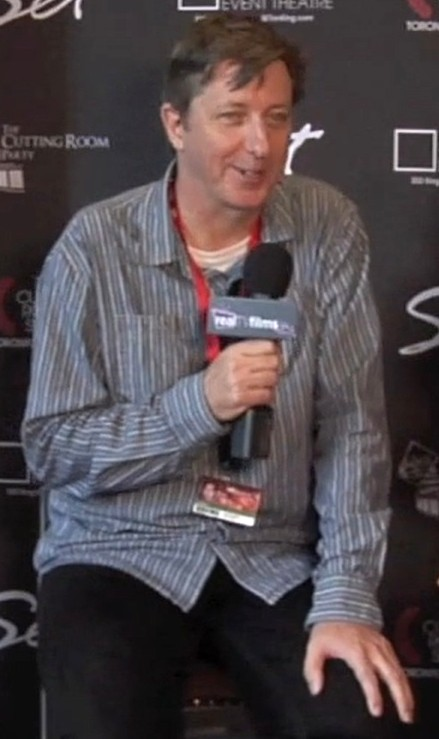
- Hartley in 2014
- Born: November 3, 1959 (age 67); Lindenhurst, New York, U.S.
- Education: Massachusetts College of Art; SUNY Purchase
- Occupations: Director, screenwriter, producer, composer
- Years active: 1984–present
- Spouse: Miho Nikaido (m. 1996)
- Website: halhartley.com

Hal Hartley (born November 3, 1959) is an American film director, screenwriter, producer and composer who became a key figure in the American independent film movement of the 1980s and '90s. His films include The Unbelievable Truth (1989), Trust (1990), Simple Men (1992), Amateur (1994) and Henry Fool (1997), which are notable for deadpan humour and offbeat characters quoting philosophical dialogue. Hartley frequently scores his own films, sometimes under the pseudonym Ned Rifle, and his soundtracks regularly feature music by Sonic Youth, Yo La Tengo and PJ Harvey.

His films provided a career launch for a number of actors, including Adrienne Shelly, Edie Falco, James Urbaniak, Martin Donovan, Karen Sillas and Elina Löwensohn.

== Early life ==
Hartley was born in Lindenhurst, New York, the son of an ironworker. Hartley had an early interest in painting and attended the Massachusetts College of Art in Boston, where he studied art and developed an interest in filmmaking. In 1980, he was accepted to the filmmaking program at the State University of New York at Purchase in New York, where he met a core group of technicians and actors who would go on to work with him on his feature films, including his regular cinematographer Michael Spiller.

== Early feature films ==
Hartley shot The Unbelievable Truth in 1988. Made on a shoestring budget and filmed in his native Long Island, it was an unconventional love story about a suburban Long Island teenager (played by Adrienne Shelly, a soon-to-be Hartley regular) falling in love with a handsome mechanic with a criminal past (Robert John Burke, also a soon-to-be Hartley regular). The screenplay featured what have become Hartley's trademarks – deadpan humour, offbeat, stilted, pause-filled dialogue, and characters posing philosophical questions about the meaning of life, combined with a degree of stylization in acting, choreography and camera movement. The film received positive reviews and was nominated for the Grand Jury Prize at the 1990 Sundance Film Festival.

Trust (1990) followed similar themes and style to The Unbelievable Truth, again an offbeat romantic comedy starring Adrienne Shelly as a Long Island teenager who forms a complex romantic relationship with a mysterious computer repairman (played by Martin Donovan, another Hartley regular). Trust won the Waldo Salt Screenwriting Award at the 1991 Sundance Film Festival. Hartley followed this with the short feature Surviving Desire (1991), a romantic comedy about a college professor (Donovan) who has an affair with a student (Mary B. Ward). Simple Men (1992), a drama about two brothers (played by Burke and Bill Sage) who reunite to search for their anarchist father and encounter two women in a small town (Karen Sillas and Elina Löwensohn), was entered in competition at the 1992 Cannes Film Festival.

Amateur (1994) marked a change of pace for Hartley, exploring somber themes. Described as "a metaphysical thriller", it starred Isabelle Huppert as a former nun trying to write pornographic fiction who meets Thomas (Martin Donovan), a man suffering from amnesia, and Sophia (Elina Löwensohn), Thomas's wife and a porn star, who reveals that Thomas was a violent criminal and pornographer.

Hartley developed Flirt (1995) as an extension of his short film of the same name made in 1993. The film is a triptych of three separate characters involved in romantic entanglements in different cities – New York, Berlin and Tokyo – with each story using the same dialogue. The film stars Hartley regulars Bill Sage, Parker Posey, Martin Donovan, Dwight Ewell and the Japanese actress Miho Nikaido, whom Hartley married in 1996.

== Later works ==
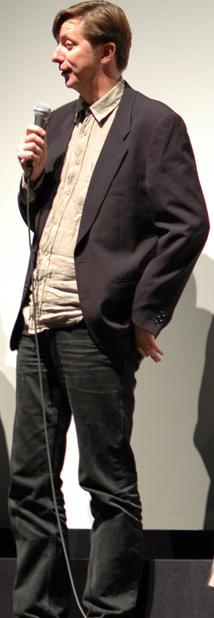
Hartley in 2006

Hartley achieved his greatest commercial and critical success with Henry Fool (1997), a comic drama about a near-catatonic garbageman Simon Grim (James Urbaniak) and his sister Fay (Parker Posey), who meet Henry Fool (Thomas Jay Ryan), a libertine and aspiring novelist who inspires Simon to write and seduces Fay and her depressed mother (Maria Porter). The film garnered positive reviews, and it was entered into competition at the 1998 Cannes Film Festival, where Hartley won the Best Screenplay Award.

Hartley was invited to contribute the American entry to 2000, Seen By... a series of films financed by French television to celebrate the 2000 millennium. His entry, a black comedy titled The Book of Life (1998) was shot entirely on digital video in New York City in 1998. According to the film summary "[t]he end of the millennium has taken on a certain significance in modern day prophecies", and Hartley's The Book of Life considers a scenario where Jesus Christ has second thoughts about the Apocalypse and argues with the Devil. The dialogue-heavy plot is driven the two along with Christ's assistant Magdelene, debating the end of the world, and the possibility of human redemption; The story imagines Jesus (Martin Donovan) returning to Earth on the eve of the 2000 millennium to open the Book of Life (the Seven Seals stored on an Apple Mac laptop), which will start the Apocalypse. English alt-rocker PJ Harvey stars as herself, the ethereal Magdalene. Some sources state that William Burroughs is featured, but according to Hartley, this is actually a shot of the film's production manager doing a Burroughs impression (Burroughs had actually died the previous year). The film screened on French television and had a limited commercial release in cinemas.

Hartley's next feature No Such Thing (2001) tells the story of Beatrice (Sarah Polley), a journalist whose fiancé is killed by a monster in Iceland. Beatrice's editor (Helen Mirren) orders Beatrice to go to Iceland to interview the monster (Robert John Burke), who is a sensitive philosopher. The film also stars Julie Christie as a doctor sympathetic to the monster's cause. The film was screened in the Un Certain Regard section at the 2001 Cannes Film Festival.

The Girl from Monday (2005), filmed in New York City and Puerto Rico, is set in a future dystopia where people are encouraged to record their sexual encounters as an economic transaction and thus increase their consumer buying power. The film stars Bill Sage, Sabrina Lloyd and Tatiana Abracos. It premiered at the 2005 Sundance Film Festival and received a limited cinematic release, receiving mostly negative reviews.

In late 2005, Hartley moved from New York to Berlin and began preparing Fay Grim, an intended sequel to Henry Fool. The film, which starred Parker Posey, James Urbaniak and Thomas Jay Ryan reprising their roles from Henry Fool, was a comedy-drama in which Fay is coerced by a CIA agent (Jeff Goldblum) to try to locate notebooks that belonged to Henry (now a fugitive). The film was shot in 2006 in locations in Berlin, Paris, and Istanbul and premiered at the 2006 Toronto International Film Festival. It had a limited cinematic release in 2007 and received mixed reviews.

Since 1999, Hartley's films predominantly have been shot with digital cameras, including the features The Book of Life, The Girl from Monday, Fay Grim and Meanwhile (2011), in addition to his short films. His digital aesthetic is significantly different from that seen in the 1990s, and his films shot by Michael Spiller on 35mm film, which exhibit blurring of the image (due to a very low shutter speed), the use of freeze frames, and shifts between colour and black-and-white footage, also display a considerable divergence from the washed-out colours and straightforward cinematography of the Long Island films from the early 1990s. Meanwhile received its world premiere at the Camerimage festival in Bydgoszcz, Poland on 29 November 2011. The hour-long feature was released on DVD in 2012 following a successful funding campaign by Hartley using the Kickstarter website.

In November 2013, Hartley funded Ned Rifle, the third film in the trilogy that began with Henry Fool and Fay Grim, via a Kickstarter campaign. The film premiered on September 7, 2014, at the 2014 Toronto International Film Festival.

From 2015 to 2017, Hartley directed eight episodes of Red Oaks.

== Short films ==
In addition to his feature work, Hartley has made a number of short films, many of which have been collected and re-released in DVD anthologies.

== Theatre ==
Hartley's stage play Soon, a drama dealing with the confrontation at Waco, Texas, between the religious community known as the Branch Davidians and the U.S. federal government, was first produced at the Salzburg Festival and then later that year in Antwerp. It was also staged in the U.S. in 2001.

== Awards ==
In 1996, Hartley was made Chevalier of the Order of Arts and Letters of the French Republic.

From 2001 through 2004, Hartley was a visiting lecturer at Harvard University while simultaneously editing No Such Thing, shooting The Girl from Monday and writing Fay Grim.

Hartley was awarded a fellowship by The American Academy in Berlin in late 2004, where he did research related to a proposed large-scale project concerning the life of French educator and social activist Simone Weil.

== Works ==
=== Feature films ===
Year	Title	Director	Writer	Producer	Composer	Notes
1989	The Unbelievable Truth	Yes	Yes	Yes	No	Also editor
1990	Trust	Yes	Yes	Yes	No	
1991	Surviving Desire	Yes	Yes	No	Yes	Also editor
1992	Simple Men	Yes	Yes	Yes	Yes	
1994	Amateur	Yes	Yes	Yes	Yes	
1995	Flirt	Yes	Yes	Yes	Yes	Also co-editor Acting role: Hal
1997	Henry Fool	Yes	Yes	Yes	Yes	
1998	The Book of Life	Yes	Yes	No	No	
2001	No Such Thing	Yes	Yes	Yes	Yes	
2005	The Girl from Monday	Yes	Yes	Yes	Yes	
2006	Fay Grim	Yes	Yes	Yes	Yes	Also editor
2011	Meanwhile	Yes	Yes	Yes	Yes	
2014	Ned Rifle	Yes	Yes	Yes	Yes	
2014	My America	Yes	No	Yes	Yes	Documentary
2025	Where to Land	Yes	Yes	Yes	Yes	

=== Short films ===
- Kid (1984)
- The Cartographer's Girlfriend (1987)
- Dogs (1988)
- Ambition (1991)
- Theory of Achievement (1991)
- Flirt (1993)
- Opera No. 1 (1994) (Possible Films Vol. 1)
- NYC 3/94 (1994) (Possible Films Vol. 1)
- Iris (1994)
- The Other Also (1997) (Possible Films Vol. 1)
- The New Math(s) (1999) (Possible Films Vol. 1)
- Kimono (2000) (Possible Films Vol. 1)
- The Sisters of Mercy (2004) (Possible Films Vol. 1)
- Regarding Soon (2004) (Possible Films Vol. 1)
- A/Muse (2010) (Possible Films Vol. 2)
- Implied Harmonies (2010) (Possible Films Vol. 2)
- The Apologies (2010) (Possible Films Vol. 2)
- Adventure (2010) (Possible Films Vol. 2)
- Accomplice (2010) (Possible Films Vol. 2)

=== Theatre ===
Year	Title	Credits	Venues
1998	Soon	Director, writer and composer	Salzburg Festival
2001	Soon	Director, writer and composer	Segerstrom Center for the Arts

=== Streaming television ===
Year	Title	Notes
2015–2017	Red Oaks	Directed 8 episodes

=== Bibliography ===
Year	Title	ISBN	Type
2021	Motherless Children	978-1-7321817-4-8	Unproduced television series screenplay
2021	Where to Land and other screenplays	978-1-7321817-6-2	Screenplay collection
2022	Acts	978-1-7379274-2-6	Screenplay collection
2022	Our Lady of the Highway	978-1-7379274-3-3	Novel
2022	Amateur and Flirt	978-1-7321817-9-3	Screenplay collection
