= Where to Land =

2025 independent film

- Official poster
- Directed by: Hal Hartley
- Written by: Hal Hartley
- Produced by: Hal Hartley
- Starring: Bill Sage; Edie Falco; Robert John Burke; Gia Crovatin; Kathleen Chalfant; Kim Taff
- Music by: Hal Hartley
- Release date: 2025
- Country: United States
- Language: English

Where to Land is a 2025 independent film written, directed and produced by Hal Hartley.

The film was funded by Kickstarter.

== Plot ==
A successful film director of romantic comedies seeks out a new life as a groundskeeper.

== Critical reception ==
/Film, "Though it’s among his most light-hearted and charming works, Where to Land’s ruminations on the quintessentially Hartley subjects of art, labor, commerce, aging, and mortality have rarely been far from my mind since my first viewing."

The Film Stage, "A true marvel of a movie, it’s equally enthralled by wind in the trees and a momentary pause in a conversation, patiently waiting for us to discover its calming power."

Vice, "In an age of brain-lacerating tech and herdlike algorithmic group-think, Hartley stands out in ever-greater contrast as a quietly intransigent auteur force."

Los Angeles Daily News, "It is quintessential Hartley, mixing musings about life and death and the meaning of it all with contemplations of storytelling and a steady dose of comedy, some of it playfully silly. (There are two young filmmaker characters named Mick and Keith who provide an Abbott and Costello-esque exchange about classic rock bands.)
