= Sudden Manhattan =

1996 film by Adrienne Shelly

- Directed by: Adrienne Shelly
- Written by: Adrienne Shelly
- Produced by: Marcia Kirkley
- Starring: Adrienne Shelly; Tim Guinee; Roger Rees; Louise Lasser
- Cinematography: Jim Denault
- Edited by: Jack Haigis
- Music by: Pat Irwin
- Distributed by: Phaedra Cinema
- Release date: March 7, 1996
- Running time: 80 minutes
- Country: United States
- Language: English

Sudden Manhattan is a 1996 comedy film written and directed by and starring Adrienne Shelly. The movie was distributed by Phaedra Cinema, which specialized in independent movies such as this. The cast included Tim Guinee and Roger Rees. It was filmed in New York and tells the story of a group of Manhattanites, one of whom, Donna (Shelly), witnesses a murder.

== Cast ==
- Adrienne Shelly as Donna
- Tim Guinee as Adam
- Roger Rees as Murphy
- Louise Lasser as Dominga
- Hynden Walch as Georgie
- Kevin Cahoon as Georgie's Brother
- Jon Sklaroff as Ian
