= Burn Country =

2016 film

- Theatrical release poster
- Directed by: Ian Olds
- Screenplay by: Ian Olds; Paul Felten
- Produced by: Jennifer Glynn; Caroline von Kuhn
- Starring: Dominic Rains; Melissa Leo; James Franco; Rachel Brosnahan; Thomas Jay Ryan; James Oliver Wheatley; Tim Kniffin
- Cinematography: Adam Newport-Berra
- Edited by: Scott Cummings; Joe Murphy; Ian Olds
- Music by: Jim McHugh
- Production company: ACE Productions
- Distributed by: Orion Pictures; Samuel Goldwyn Films
- Release dates: April 16, 2016 (Tribeca Film Festival); December 9, 2016 (United States)
- Running time: 102 minutes
- Country: United States
- Language: English

Burn Country (originally released as The Fixer) is a 2016 American crime film directed by Ian Olds and written by Ian Olds and Paul Felten. The film stars Dominic Rains, Melissa Leo, James Franco, Rachel Brosnahan, Tim Kniffin, Thomas Jay Ryan, Tim Kniffin, and James Oliver Wheatley. The film was released on December 9, 2016, by Orion Pictures and Samuel Goldwyn Films.

Principal photography took place largely in Sonoma County, California. Much of the film was shot in Sebastopol, California, Santa Rosa, California, and Bodega Bay, California.

== Synopsis ==
The film follows an exiled Afghan journalist living in Northern California who covers a local crime and is drawn into a world of violence.

== Cast ==
- Dominic Rains as Osman
- Melissa Leo as Gloria
- James Franco as Lindsay
- Rachel Brosnahan as Sandra
- Thomas Jay Ryan as Dmitri Sokurov
- James Oliver Wheatley as Gabe
- Gail Gamble as Critic
- Wendy Vanden Heuvel as Maddie
- Ari Vozaitis as Pyro Kid
- Tim Kniffin as Carl
- Gabe Maxson as Marcus
- Michelle Maxson as Karen

== Release ==
The film premiered at the Tribeca Film Festival on April 16, 2016. The film was released on December 9, 2016, by Orion Pictures and Samuel Goldwyn Films.
