= Meanwhile (2011 film) =

- Directed by: Hal Hartley
- Written by: Hal Hartley
- Produced by: Hal Hartley
- Starring: D.J. Mendel; Danielle Meyer; Pallavi Sastry
- Cinematography: Daniel Sharnoff
- Edited by: Kyle Gilman
- Distributed by: Possible Films
- Release date: November 29, 2011 (Camerimage Film Festival)
- Running time: 59 minutes
- Country: United States
- Language: English

Meanwhile is a 2011 American film written and directed by Hal Hartley.

== Plot ==
A man must traverse the city of Manhattan to get the keys to a friend’s apartment while coming in contact with various New Yorkers along the way.
