= Thomas Jay Ryan =

American actor (born 1962)

- Born: August 1, 1962 (age 64); Pittsburgh, Pennsylvania, U.S.
- Education: Carnegie Mellon University
- Occupation: Actor

Thomas Jay Ryan (born August 1, 1962) is an American actor. He may be best known for his starring role in the 1997 film Henry Fool.

== Early life and education ==
Born in Pittsburgh, Pennsylvania, Ryan attended Carnegie Mellon University and has worked in such theaters as the Guthrie Theater in Minneapolis and the Yale Repertory Theatre in New Haven. In addition, he has worked with avant garde playwright Richard Foreman and has played roles ranging from Dracula to Degas.

== Career ==
Ryan had supporting roles in a variety of films, including Teknolust, Eternal Sunshine of the Spotless Mind, The Book of Life, Dream Boy, and the sequels to Henry Fool, Fay Grim (2007) and Ned Rifle (2014).

He played pioneering gay activist Harry Hay in the initial production of the play The Temperamentals in 2009 in New York. In 2016, Ryan played Thomas Putnam in Ivo van Hove's production of Arthur Miller's play The Crucible at the Walter Kerr Theatre on Broadway. In 2019 he appeared in the off-Broadway play Eureka Day.

From August 8-25, 2023, Ryan performed as Serebryakov in Uncle Vanya, an off-off broadway production in an unmarked Manhattan loft. He replaced Bill Irwin, who had performed the role earlier in the summer.

== Filmography ==
=== Film ===
Year	Title	Role	Notes
1997	Henry Fool	Henry Fool	
1998	The Book of Life	Satan	
2000	The Legend of Bagger Vance	Spec Hammond	
2001	Dischord	Jimmy	
2002	Noon Blue Apples	Zeus	
2002	Teknolust	Preacher	
2004	Eternal Sunshine of the Spotless Mind	Frank	
2005	The Dying Gaul	Uncredited	
2005	The Pigs	Larry Wemuth	
2006	Fay Grim	Henry Fool	
2007	Strange Culture	Steve Kurtz	
2007	The Attic	Dr. Perry	
2008	Dream Boy	Harland Davies	
2008	South of Heaven	Hood 2	
2009	My Sweet Misery	Psychologist	
2014	Ned Rifle	Henry Fool	
2014	Sabbatical	Dan Keaton	
2015	Equals	Gideon	
2015	The Missing Girl	Stan Colvins	
2016	Burn Country	Dmitri Sokurov	
2018	Dedalus	Older unrequited lover	Part 2 of triptych
2018	My Entire High School Sinking into the Sea	Principal Grimm	Voice
2020	The Return of Tragedy	Chef de la police	
2021	Cryptozoo	Nicholas	Voice
2021	Scenes from an Empty Church	Father James	
2021	Ghostwritten	Martin	
2024	Darla in Space	Arnot Pickens	

=== Television ===
Year	Title	Role	Notes
1998	Degas and the Dancer	Edward Degas	Television film
1999	Mary Cassatt: An American Impressionist	Edward Degas	Television film
2012	Elementary	Ken Whitman	Episode: "Dead Mans's Switch"
2014	Nurse Jackie	—N/a	Episode: "Rat on a Cheeto"
2016	The Good Wife	Ed Janoway	Episode: "Targets"
2017	Blue Bloods	Judge Carter Metcalf	Episode: "Love Lost"

=== Stage ===
Year	Title	Role	Notes
1984	Twelfth Night	Malvolio/Sebastian/A Sea Captain	National Tour
1987	Cyrano de Bergerac	Vadim/Monk/Page/Ligniere	Mill Mountain Theatre
1990	Macbeth	Ross	Classic Theatre International
1992	Little Eyolf	Alfred Allmers	Target Margin Theater, Off-Broadway
1993	Samuel's Major Problems	Samuel	St. Mark's Theatre
1994	My Head Was a Sledgehammer	The Professor	St. Mark's Theatre
1996	Venus	The Young Man	The Public Theater, Off-Broadway
1997	South	Jan Wicziewsky	Target Margin Theater, Off-Broadway
1997	Christmas at the Ivanovs	Performer	Classic Stage Company, Off-Broadway
2000	Juno and the Paycock	Joxer	Gramercy Theatre, Off-Broadway
2001	The Philadelphia Story	Macauley "Mike" Conner	Hartford Stage
2002	This Thing of Darkness	Frank/Donald	Atlantic Theater Company, Off-Broadway
2004	Five by Tenn	Clerk/Carl/Two	Shakespeare Theatre Company
2004	Suitcase or Those That Resemble Flies from a Distance	Lyle	La Jolla Playhouse
2004	Sin (A Cardinal Deposed)	Orson Krieger	The New Group, Off-Broadway
2005	Celebration	Bert Hudd	Atlantic Theater Company, Off-Broadway
2005	The Room	Matt	Atlantic Theater Company, Off-Broadway
2006	In the Matter of J. Robert Oppenheimer	J. Robert Oppenheimer	Connelly Theater, Off-Broadway
2007	The Misanthrope	Philinte	New York Theatre Workshop, Off-Broadway
2007	Dulcy	Vincent Leach	Dorset Theatre Festival
2008	Tragedy: a tragedy	John in the Field	Berkeley Repertory Theatre
2008	Passion Play, A Cycle	VA/Visiting Englishman/Visiting Friar Yale Repertory Theatre	
2009	Six Degrees of Separation	Flanders Kittredge	Old Globe Theatre
2009	In the Next Room	Mr. Daldry	Lyceum Theatre, Broadway
2010	The Temperamentals	Harry Hay	New World Stages, Off-Broadway
2010	The Little Foxes	Oscar Hubbard	New York Theatre Workshop, Off-Broadway
2011	Tom Ryan Thinks He's James Mason Starring in a Movie By Nicholas Ray in which a Man's Illness Provides an Escape from the Pain, Pressure and Loneliness of Trying to be the Ultimate American Father, Only to Drive Him Further Into the More Thrilling Though Possibly Lonelier Roles of Addict and Misunderstood Visionary	Tom Ryan	St. Mark's Theatre, Off-Broadway
2011	Three Sisters	Nicolai Lvovich Tuzenbach	Berkeley Repertory Theatre
2012	The Lady from Dubuque	Edgar	Signature Theatre Company, Off-Broadway
2012	Hedda Gabler	Judge Brack	Hartford Stage
2013	Troublemaker, or the Freakin Kick-A Adventures of Bradley Boatright	Homeless Pirate Zombie/Guy/Hank Miller	Berkeley Repertory Theatre
2013	Red Speedo	Peter	Studio Theatre
2014	The Correspondent	Phillip	Rattlestick Theatre Company, Off-Broadway
2015	A Month in the Country	Doctor Shpigelsky	Classic Stage Company, Off-Broadway
2015	10 out of 12	Paul	SoHo Repertory Theatre, Off-Broadway
2015	Travels With my Aunt	Aunt Augusta	Keen Company, Off-Broadway
2016	The Crucible	Thomas Putnam	Walter Kerr Theatre, Broadway
2016	A View from the Bridge	Alfieri	Ahmanson Theatre
2017	Measure for Measure	Angelo	Theatre for a New Audience, Off-Broadway
2018	The Amateurs	Larking	Vineyard Theatre, Off-Broadway
2018	Dance Nation	Dance Teacher Pat	Playwrights Horizons, Off-Broadway
2018	The Nap	Danny Killeen	Samuel J. Friedman Theatre, Broadway
2019	Eureka Day	Don	Walkerspace, Off-Broadway
2020	West Side Story	Lt. Schrank	Broadway Theatre, Broadway
2021	Wintertime	Francois	Berkeley Repertory Theatre
2022	Becky Nurse of Salem	The Judge/The Jailer	Lincoln Center Theater, Off-Broadway
2023	Henry IV Part 1 and Henry IV, Part 2	King Henry IV	Theatre for a New Audience, Off-Broadway
2023	Richard II	Henry Bolingbroke	Theatre for a New Audience, Off-Broadway
2023	Arden of Faversham	Arden	Lucille Lortel Theatre, Off-Broadway
2023	Deep Blue Sound	John	Clubbed Thumb, Off-Broadway
2023	Arms and the Man	Paul Petkoff	Gingold Theatrical Group, Off-Broadway
2023	Uncle Vanya	Serebryakov (Replacement)	NYC Flatiron Loft
2024	An Enemy of the People	Aslaksen	Circle in the Square Theatre, Broadway
2024	Franklinland	Benjamin Franklin	Ensemble Studio Theatre, Off-Broadway
2026	Kramer/Fauci	Larry Kramer	NYU Skirball, Off-Broadway
2026	Kramer/Fauci	Larry Kramer	St. Ann's Warehouse, Off-Broadway
