= Henry Fool =

- Theatrical release poster
- Directed by: Hal Hartley
- Written by: Hal Hartley
- Produced by: Larry Meistrich; Hal Hartley
- Starring: Thomas Jay Ryan; James Urbaniak; Parker Posey
- Cinematography: Michael Spiller
- Edited by: Steve Hamilton
- Music by: Hal Hartley
- Distributed by: Sony Pictures Classics
- Release dates: September 7, 1997 (TIFF); June 19, 1998
- Running time: 137 minutes
- Country: United States
- Language: English
- Budget: $900,000
- Box office: $1.3 million

Henry Fool is a 1997 American black comedy-drama film written, produced and directed by Hal Hartley, featuring Thomas Jay Ryan, James Urbaniak, and Parker Posey. Set like previous Hartley films in less affluent parts of Long Island, it recounts how the lives of a fatherless family are overturned by a mysterious outsider and how, as in The Unbelievable Truth, expectation and reality again conflict.

The film won the best screenplay award at the 1998 Cannes Film Festival. A sequel, titled Fay Grim, was released in 2006. Another sequel, titled Ned Rifle, was released in 2014.

== Plot ==
Socially inept garbageman Simon Grim lives a monotonous life with his sister Fay, unemployed, and his mother Mary, who suffers from severe depression. Henry Fool, who's on probation from prison for statutory rape, sets himself up in their basement and proceeds to impinge himself on their daily lives. Seeing Simon's interest in literature, Henry encourages him to write his thoughts in a notebook. Simon fills several notebooks with what turns out to be a poem and Henry encourages him to try to get it published, even though it is dismissed by many as pornographic and scatological. Simon meets with one publisher, Angus, supposedly a friend of Henry's. Angus rejects the manuscript and claims no knowledge of Henry; his secretary reveals that Henry worked in Angus' office as a janitor.

Henry himself has a number of notebooks that he refers to as his Confession, a work that details his mysterious past and which he hopes to publish, although he won't let anyone read them. Meanwhile, Henry inflicts his hedonistic manner on all those around him, ultimately impregnating Fay, after which Henry and Fay marry. At Henry's suggestion, Fay uploads verses from Simon's poem to the Internet, where it elicits worldwide controversy, attracting adoration from those who appreciate Simon as a transgressive genius and condemnation from conservative politicians who see his work as degenerate. Excited by the opportunity to profit from the poem, Angus approaches Simon again and, after negotiations, ultimately offers him $200,000 up front and a 60/40 royalty split to publish it.

Henry is distressed over becoming a father, worried that the time spent working a job to support his family will conflict with his passions as a writer. In a gesture of gratitude for his help, Simon tells Henry he is going to insist Angus publish Henry's work as part of his contract. Henry finally allows Simon to read the notebooks; Simon dislikes the work, but brings it to Angus as promised. Angus hates the Confession and refuses to publish it, forcing Simon to reconsider his promise to Henry. As Fay gives birth to a son, Simon notifies Henry of Angus' refusal and reveals that he signed the contract anyway. The two men argue and Simon states he is going away. Henry is obviously distraught.

Seven years pass. Henry has a job at the garbage company where Simon used to work, while Simon is living elsewhere and has just won the Nobel Prize in Literature. One evening, Henry is informed by a neighbor girl that her stepfather has beaten her mother again and indicates he's also been abusing her; she offers a sexual favor if Henry will kill him. When Henry stops by the neighbors' house to check on the mother, he's confronted by the drunken husband, who begins to beat Henry viciously; Henry kills the man in self-defense. Henry's past conviction, coupled with the accounting by the girl of her offer, makes him appear guilty. Henry and Fay's young son, Ned, finds Simon and brings him back to help Henry. Simon was supposed to be on his way to the airport to catch a flight to Stockholm to accept his Nobel Prize, but instead has his passport altered and gives it and his ticket to Henry. They arrive late for the flight but, due to Simon's prestige and mission, the airline holds the plane as a courtesy. The flight attendants anxiously hurry Henry (as Simon) along as he painfully limps towards the plane, but he pauses and looks back. The last shot is a closeup of Henry running with his luggage.

== Cast ==
- Thomas Jay Ryan as Henry Fool
- James Urbaniak as Simon Grim
- Parker Posey as Fay Grim
- Liam Aiken as Ned
- Maria Porter as Mary
- Miho Nikaido as Gnoc Deng
- James Saito as Mr. Deng
- Kevin Corrigan as Warren
- Camille Paglia as herself
- Nicholas Hope as Father Hawkes
- Toy Connor as Teenager at World Of Donuts

== Production ==
Henry Fool was directed, written, co-produced and composed by Hal Hartley. He began writing the project in the 1980s, and spent years developing and fine-tuning it. Significant writing took place in 1995, and Hartley realized that Henry would be the story's main character, rather than Simon. Hartley wanted the story to incorporate current events, adding elements such as Congressional races and Internet censorship.

The characters of Henry and Simon were partly inspired by the relationship between writers James Joyce and Samuel Beckett. Goethe's Faust was also an inspiration for the film, with Hartley comparing Henry to Mephistopheles. Another inspiration for Henry was John Falstaff, while Hartley compared Simon with Kaspar Hauser. Hartley included gross-out humor, such as vomiting, because he wanted the film to discuss serious topics in a non-academic atmosphere: "I didn't want Henry and Simon to be wearing tweed coats and have Ph.D.s. They needed to be, to a certain degree, disgusting." He said about Henry: "I didn't want it to be too easy to like him. I mean, he's so bombastic, so funny and disgusting—it's easy just to fall in love with this man. So he really had to have been in prison for something inexcusable." Hartley considered Henry a compelling character because "we never know if he is lying or not".

Hartley chose not to show Simon's poem to the viewer, believing that films about artists "always get it wrong when they show the art. And they let the audience participate in the judgment of the art, whether the art is good or bad". He said that "for the most part, the artistic worth of Simon's poem is not the issue. The issue is the manner in which Simon's life changes as a result of knowing Henry and how that change begins to threaten Henry". The contents of Henry's confession are not specifically discussed either, although Hartley said they are "probably unbelievably pretentious".

Henry Fool marked the feature film debuts of Thomas Jay Ryan, James Urbaniak, and Liam Aiken. Ryan and Urbaniak were both stage actors. Ryan was cast after Hartley saw him in a play by Richard Foreman called My Head Was a Sledgehammer. Ryan said that Hartley wanted an actor "larger than life, likable, but also patently absurd". Urbaniak had previously appeared in short films made by Hartley. Maria Porter was cast at the suggestion of Ryan, who went to college with her. The role of Ned was narrowed down to three boys, and Aiken won the part because of his natural demeanor.

The start of filming was delayed several times because of financial setbacks, and Ryan had a year and a half to discuss his character with Hartley. Henry's confession is briefly glimpsed in the film, with Ryan's handwriting. Months before the start of production, Hartley gave him a notebook to write in, so it would be ready for filming. The film was produced on a budget of $900,000, a large portion of which went to the rental of camera and sound equipment. Filming took place in 1997, and the shoot lasted three or four weeks. Parker Posey filmed her scenes in four days.

== Reception ==
Based on 28 reviews collected by the film review aggregator Rotten Tomatoes, 89% of critics gave Henry Fool a positive review, with an average rating of 7.42/10. Metacritic, which uses a weighted average, assigned the film a score of 68 out of 100, based on 22 critics, indicating "generally favorable" reviews.

Leonard Maltin gives the film two and a half stars, saying Hartley "just misses the mark".
