= Robert John Burke =

American actor (born 1960)

- Born: September 12, 1960 (age 66); New York City, New York, U.S.
- Other name: Bobby Burke
- Education: State University of New York, Purchase (BFA)
- Occupations: Actor, firefighter
- Years active: 1986–present
- Children: 2

Robert John Burke (born September 12, 1960) is an American actor known for his roles in the early films of Hal Hartley as well as his roles in RoboCop 3 (1993), Tombstone (1993), Thinner (1996), and as General Fitzgerald in Digger (2026). Burke became well known for his portrayal of Mickey Gavin on Rescue Me (2004–11), Bart Bass in Gossip Girl (2007–12), Ed Tucker in Law & Order: Special Victims Unit (2002–20), Officer Patrick Simmons in Person of Interest (2011–2013), Seth in The Last of Us (2025), and a number of other film and television roles including Intrusion (2021).

== Early life and education ==
Burke was born in Washington Heights, Manhattan and attended the Acting Conservatory at the State University of New York at Purchase.

== Career ==
Burke's television roles include Mickey Gavin on Rescue Me, Bart Bass on Gossip Girl, Kidnapped, Six Degrees, Law & Order and IAB Captain Ed Tucker on Law & Order: Special Victims Unit, Officer Patrick Simmons on Person of Interest, Sex and the City, and The Sopranos.

Burke's film work began as a regular performer in fellow Purchase alumnus Hal Hartley's indie films, such as 1989's The Unbelievable Truth. Burke appeared opposite Laura Dern's Academy Award nominated performance in the 1991 feature Rambling Rose. He returned to work with Hartley again in 1992 in the Cannes Film Festival, Palme d'Or nominated Simple Men. He also appeared in Hartley's 1995 film Flirt. Burke took over the lead from Peter Weller in RoboCop 3.

He starred in Richard Stanley's 1993 film Dust Devil, and in 2001's No Such Thing. In 1996, he played the lead role in the film adaptation of Stephen King's Thinner. In 2004, Burke played the role of Mr. Neck in the independent film Speak. In 2005, Burke had a role in Hide and Seek, a psychological thriller.

He had roles in the Academy Award-nominated films Munich directed by Steven Spielberg and Good Night, and Good Luck, directed by George Clooney. In 2008, he portrayed James Mattis, Commanding General of 1st Marine Division in the HBO miniseries Generation Kill. Burke also portrayed General Ned Almond, commanding general of the 92nd Division, Buffalo Soldiers, in the 2008 Spike Lee film Miracle at St. Anna. He appeared in the 2012 film Safe. He played the Colorado Springs chief of police in Spike Lee's BlacKkKlansman (2018).

In 2015 and 2017, he appeared in three episodes of Last Week Tonight with John Oliver, once parodying his role on Law & Order. Burke is seen opposite Frieda Pinto in the Netflix thriller Intrusion. In 2022, he portrayed a CIA agent Smitty in Black Panther: Wakanda Forever. He next appeared alongside Keira Knightly in a remake of the crime drama The Boston Strangler. In 2025, he guest-starred as Seth in the second season of The Last of Us.

== Personal life ==
Burke holds a second degree black belt in Matsubayashi-ryū, Shorin-ryu Okinawan karate. He is currently a volunteer firefighter as the captain of Engine 7 of the Ocean Beach Fire Department Suffolk County, Long Island NY.

Burke's decision to become a firefighter was informed by the loss of his best friend, FDNY Capt. Patrick J. Brown, Ladder-3, on 9/11, along with many of his other friends that day. Burke worked at the site and was present for weeks during recovery efforts.

== Filmography ==
=== Film ===
Year	Title	Role	Notes
1989	The Unbelievable Truth	Josh	
1991	Rambling Rose	Dave Wilkie	
1992	Dust Devil	Dust Devil	
1992	Simple Men	Bill McCabe	
1993	A Far Off Place	Paul Parker	
1993	RoboCop 3	Alex Murphy / RoboCop	Credited as Robert Burke
1993	Heaven & Earth	G.I. Paul	
1993	Tombstone	Frank McLaury	
1995	Flirt	Men's Room Man #	
1995	Killer: A Journal of Murder	R.G. Greiser	
1996	If Lucy Fell	Handsome Man	
1996	Fled	U.S. Marshal Pat Schiller	
1996	Thinner	Billy Halleck	
1997	May day – Flug in den Tod	Tom Hutton	
1997	Cop Land	Officer B	
1997	First Love, Last Rites	Henry	
1998	Somewhere in the City	Frankie	
2001	No Such Thing	Monster	
2002	Confessions of a Dangerous Mind	Drill Instructor Jenks / TV Censor	
2003	Tea Time with Roy & Sylvia	Roy	Short film
2003	Piggie	Dad	
2004	Speak	Mr. Neck	
2004	Connie and Carla	Rudy	
2005	Hide and Seek	Steven	
2005	Good Night, and Good Luck.	Charlie Mack	Nominated — Screen Actors Guild Award for Outstanding Performance by a Cast in a Motion Picture (shared with cast)
2005	Munich	Belligerent American	
2006	The Oh in Ohio	Binky Taylor	
2006	Jack's Law	Det. Ron Banks	
2006	The Ex	Colonel	Previously titled Fast Track
2008	Miracle at St. Anna	General Ned Almond	
2010	Brooklyn's Finest	State Trooper #1	
2011	Limitless	Pierce	
2012	Safe	Captain Wolf	
2013	2 Guns	Jessup	
2015	True Story	Detective Greg Ganley	
2017	Future '38	General Sportwood	
2018	BlacKkKlansman	Chief Bridges	
2018	Boarding School	Mr. Holcomb	
2021	Intrusion	Detective Stephen Morse	
2022	The Retaliators	Captain Briggs	
2022	Black Panther: Wakanda Forever	Smitty	
2023	Boston Strangler	Eddie Holland	
2025	Where to Land	Leonard	
2026	Digger	General Fitzgerald	
TBA	Subversion	TBA	Post-production

=== Television ===
Year	Title	Role	Notes
1986	The Equalizer	O'Toole	Episode: "Torn"
1994	Roseanne	Bodyguard	Episode: "Girl Talk"
1995	Crazy for a Kiss	Steve	Television film
1995–2004	Law & Order	Arthur "Buzz" Palley / FBI Agent Ron Innes / Lt. Colonel Milton Danbury	3 episodes
1998	Homicide: Life on the Street	Jeffrey Andrews	Episode: "Abduction"
1998	From the Earth to the Moon	William Anders	2 episodes
1998	A Bright Shining Lie	Frank Drummond	Television film
1998	Midnight Flight	Paul Bacon	Television film
2000	Falcone	Jules Weller	Episode: "Windows"
2000–2003	Oz	Special Agent Pierce Taylor	8 episodes
2002	Witchblade	Det. Dean Gorner	Episode: "Agape"
2002	Sex and the City	Walker Lewis	2 episodes
2002	CSI: Miami	FBI Agent Jim Resdon	1 episode
2002–2020	Law & Order: Special Victims Unit	IAB Sergeant/Lieutenant/Captain Ed Tucker	30 episodes
2004	The Sopranos	Officer Zmunda	Episode: "Two Tonys"
2004–2011	Rescue Me	Mickey Gavin	54 episodes
2006	Six Degrees	David	2 episodes
2006–2007	Kidnapped	Bellows	10 episodes
2007	Queens Supreme	Special Agent Jeff Donaldson	Episode: "Permanent Markers"
2007–2012	Gossip Girl	Bart Bass	27 episodes
2008	Generation Kill	Major General James "Chaos" Mattis	3 episodes
2010	Blue Bloods	Jyle Hogan	3 episodes
2011	White Collar	Patrick O'Leary	Episode: "The Dentist of Detroit"
2011–2013	Person of Interest	Officer Patrick Simmons	16 episodes
2012	NYC 22	Deputy Inspector Dennis McClaren	Episode: "Thugs and Lovers"
2012–2013	Army Wives	Major General Kevin Clarke	16 episodes
2013	Golden Boy	Andrew Lightstone	Episode: "Next Question"
2014	Nurse Jackie	Dick Richards	2 episodes
2015	Allegiance	Special Agent Brock	8 episodes
2015–2017	Last Week Tonight with John Oliver	Forensic Scientist, Cop	2 episodes
2019	Project Blue Book	William Fairchild	6 episodes
2025	The Last of Us	Seth	4 episodes (season 2)
