= The Book of Life (1998 film) =

- Directed by: Hal Hartley
- Written by: Hal Hartley
- Produced by: Simon Arnal; Caroline Benjo
- Starring: Martin Donovan; PJ Harvey; Thomas Jay Ryan; Miho Nikaido
- Cinematography: Jim Denault
- Edited by: Steve Hamilton
- Release date: February 25, 1998
- Running time: 63 minutes
- Language: English

The Book of Life is a 1998 film directed by Hal Hartley. In the film, Jesus returns to earth on the eve of the new millennium planning to bring about the apocalypse, but finds himself surprisingly enamored of humanity. It stars Martin Donovan as Jesus, PJ Harvey as Mary Magdalene, and Thomas Jay Ryan as The Devil. Yo La Tengo appear as a Salvation Army band.

== Plot ==
On the eve of the year 2000, Jesus Christ (Martin Donovan) returns to Earth, arriving at Kennedy Airport in New York with his mysterious and magnetic assistant Mary Magdalena (PJ Harvey). Sent by his wrathful Father, they retrieve a laptop from a locker and, with a few simple clicks, open the seven seals of the Book of Life, fulfilling the prophecy and setting in motion the Apocalypse and Armageddon. Yet, as he confronts humanity at the brink of a new millennium confused, faithless, and immersed in technology, Jesus begins to doubt the destiny assigned to him.

Meanwhile, in a seedy New York bar, a young gambler (Dave Simonds) and the waitress (Miho Nikaido) secretly in love with him strike up a conversation with a charismatic stranger (Thomas Jay Ryan) - none other than the Devil in disguise. Their stories intertwine as heaven and earth seem to collide, bringing all the characters together in a hotel room to face the end, or the possible rebirth, of the world.

== Cast ==
- Martin Donovan as Jesus Christ
- PJ Harvey as Magdalena
- Thomas Jay Ryan as Satan
- Dave Simonds as Dave, the guy in Bar
- Miho Nikaido as Edie
- D.J. Mendel as the lawyer
- Katreen Hardt as the receptionis
- James Urbaniak as the "True Believer".
- Katreen Hardt as the lawyer's assistant.

== Production ==
The film was made for the 2000, Seen By... (2000 vu par...) project, initiated by the French company Haut et Court to produce films depicting the approaching turn of the millennium seen from the perspectives of 10 different countries.

== Reception ==
On the review aggregator website Rotten Tomatoes, 89% of 9 critics' reviews are positive, with an average rating of 7.5/10.

== Soundtrack ==
The soundtrack includes PJ Harvey, Yo La Tengo, David Byrne, Takako Minekawa, Le Mystère des Voix Bulgares, Osnabrucker Jugendchor, Ben Watt and others.
