= Simple Men =

1992 film by Hal Hartley

- Directed by: Hal Hartley
- Written by: Hal Hartley
- Produced by: Jerome Brownstein; Hal Hartley
- Starring: Robert John Burke; Bill Sage; Karen Sillas; Elina Löwensohn; Martin Donovan
- Cinematography: Michael Spiller
- Edited by: Steve Hamilton
- Music by: Hal Hartley
- Production company: Good Machine
- Distributed by: Fine Line Features
- Release dates: May 11, 1992 (Cannes); October 14, 1992 (United States)
- Running time: 105 minutes
- Country: United States
- Language: English

Simple Men is a 1992 American comedy-drama film written and directed by Hal Hartley and starring Robert John Burke, Bill Sage, Karen Sillas, and Martin Donovan. It was the debut film of actress Holly Marie Combs, in a supporting role. It was entered into the 1992 Cannes Film Festival.

== Plot ==
Brothers Bill and Dennis reunite after their anarchist father escapes from the hospital.

Bill is angry after being double-crossed after a robbery by his girlfriend, and he promises to break the heart of the next woman he meets, while Dennis is fresh out of college and somewhat naive about the world. Dennis is set on finding their father, and Bill is broke, so they set off to find him.

Their motorcycle breaks down near a diner in the middle of nowhere, where they meet the beautiful Kate, mysterious Elina, and short-tempered Martin. They decide to stay for a few days and gradually become entangled in local life.

== Cast ==
- Robert John Burke as Bill McCabe
- Bill Sage as Dennis McCabe
- Karen Sillas as Kate
- Elina Löwensohn as Elina
- Martin Donovan as Martin
- Mark Bailey as Mike
- Chris Cooke as Vic
- Jeffrey Howard as Ned Rifle
- Holly Marie Combs as Kim
- Joe Stevens as Jack
- Damian Young as Sheriff
- Marietta Marich as Mom (Meg)
- John MacKay as Dad
- Bethany Wright as Mary
- Richard Reyes as Security Guard
- Margaret Bowman as Nurse Louise

== Music ==
Simple Men features the song "Kool Thing" by the American alternative rock band Sonic Youth.

A portion of dialogue from the film can be heard in the song "Paradise" off the hip-hop album E&A by Eyedea and Abilities.
