= Trust (1990 film) =

Film by Hal Hartley

- Theatrical release poster
- Directed by: Hal Hartley
- Written by: Hal Hartley
- Produced by: Bruce Weiss
- Starring: Adrienne Shelly; Martin Donovan; Merritt Nelson; Edie Falco; John MacKay
- Cinematography: Michael Spiller
- Edited by: Nick Gomez
- Music by: Phillip Reed
- Production companies: Zenith Entertainment; True Fiction Pictures; Film Four International
- Distributed by: Fine Line Features; Republic Pictures (United States); Palace Pictures (United Kingdom)
- Release dates: September 9, 1990 (TIFF); July 26, 1991 (United States)
- Running time: 107 minutes
- Countries: United States; United Kingdom
- Budget: £610,000

Trust is a 1990 romantic black comedy film written and directed by Hal Hartley and starring Adrienne Shelly, Martin Donovan, Merritt Nelson, Edie Falco, and John MacKay. In the film, two young misfits with a troubled home life meet by chance in a Long Island town and through trials develop a platonic relationship based on mutual respect, admiration, and trust.

== Plot ==
On Long Island, New York, naïve and unbookish 17-year-old Maria Coughlin informs her parents that she has dropped out of high school and is pregnant by her boyfriend Anthony, whom she plans to marry. When Maria's father John calls her a "slut" and orders her to leave, she slaps him across the face. As Maria storms out, John dies of a sudden heart attack. She tells Anthony about the pregnancy, but he breaks up with her, fearing that a baby would interfere with his prospects for a football scholarship.

Meanwhile, Matthew, a highly intelligent but emotionally unstable electronics repairman, quits his job at the Ruark computer assembly plant after expressing his frustration with the company's defective equipment and placing his supervisor's head in a vise. When Matthew returns home, his abusive father Jim slaps him and admonishes him for his inability to hold a job.

After visiting an abortion clinic, Maria returns home and learns of John's death; her mother Jean blames her for her father's death and throws her out of the house. Maria walks into a liquor store to buy a six-pack of beer. The clerk initially refuses to sell alcohol to an underage girl before requesting sexual favors from her in exchange for the beers. Maria burns the clerk's eye with a cigarette and flees.

That evening, Matthew happens upon Maria in an abandoned house. After learning that she has nowhere to go, he invites her to stay at his house. The next morning, Matthew shows Maria a hand grenade his father brought back from the Korean War, which he carries everywhere "just in case". Upon meeting Maria, Jim, enraged to find a stranger in the house, slaps Matthew and orders Maria to leave.

Seeking refuge in a local bar, Matthew is approached by Peg, Maria's divorced older sister, but rebuffs her attempts to strike up a conversation. Maria soon arrives and invites Matthew to move in with her family in order to stay away from his father. Jean has not forgiven Maria but allows her to stay. When Matthew tries to kiss Maria that night, she confiscates his grenade and hides it in her dresser.

During his stay with the Coughlins, Matthew witnesses Jean subject Maria to constant emotional abuse. Jean privately tells Matthew that he is too old for Maria and suggests that he should be with Peg instead. Matthew tries to convince Maria to move away from her mother, whom he calls a psychopath, and they share their first kiss. The next day, Matthew proposes to Maria, and she accepts. In order to obtain medical benefits for Maria and her unborn child, Matthew returns to work at Ruark, but becomes frustrated when his supervisor instructs him to assemble computers with faulty equipment.

One night, while Maria is not home, Matthew informs Jean of his plans to marry Maria. Jean protests and tricks Matthew into a drinking contest to decide Maria's fate. Unaware that Jean's bottle is filled with water, Matthew drinks from a bottle of Scotch and eventually becomes intoxicated. Jean drags Matthew into Peg's bedroom and removes his clothes. Maria returns home to find Matthew and Peg in bed together, but hides her distress from Jean.

The next morning, Maria goes through with the abortion, while Matthew quits his job at Ruark. Jim later visits Matthew at the Coughlin house, asking him to return home. When Matthew refuses, Jim makes derogatory comments about Maria and a physical altercation ensues. Maria arrives and tells Matthew that she had the abortion and that she does not want to marry him; Matthew leaves.

Realizing that Matthew's grenade is missing, Maria searches for him at the Ruark plant, which is surrounded by police. Maria finds Matthew inside the building holding the grenade in one hand and the pin in the other. She throws the grenade across the room, and it explodes shortly afterward. Matthew is arrested and Maria watches as the police car drives away.

== Cast ==
- Adrienne Shelly as Maria Coughlin
- Martin Donovan as Matthew Slaughter
- Merritt Nelson as Jean Coughlin
- John MacKay as Jim Slaughter
- Edie Falco as Peg Coughlin
- Gary Sauer as Anthony
- Matt Malloy as Ed
- Karen Sillas as Nurse Paine
- Marko Hunt as John Coughlin

== Release ==
The film premiered at the Toronto Festival of Festivals on September 9, 1990, and was released theatrically in the United States on July 26, 1991.

== Reception ==
On the review aggregator website Rotten Tomatoes, 80% of 25 critics' reviews are positive, with an average rating of 7/10. Metacritic, which uses a weighted average, assigned the film a score of 67 out of 100, based on 22 critics, indicating "generally favorable" reviews.
