= Altered Innocence =

American film distribution company

- Industry: Entertainment
- Founded: 2015
- Founder: Frank Jaffe
- Headquarters: Los Angeles, United States
- Website: alteredinnocence.net

Altered Innocence is an American film distribution company specializing in films with LGBT and coming of age themes.

== History ==
Altered Innocence was founded in 2015 by former Strand Releasing employee, Frank Jaffe, to give queer cult films proper Blu-ray and digital releases. The company also distributes films for theatrical release.

In May 2021, Altered Innocence released a short film anthology, described as a "cinematic mixtape", titled Altered Innocence Volume 1.

In 2024, Altered Innocence partnered with film distribution company MVD Entertainment Group; the former had previously been affiliated with OCN Distribution, a sister company of Vinegar Syndrome.

== Releases ==
| Spine Number | Title | Director | Release year | Notes |
|---|---|---|---|---|
| | The School Duel | Todd Wiseman Jr. | 2024 | |
| AI-1 | Concrete Night | Pirjo Honkasalo | 2013 | U.S. distribution |
| AI-2 | Desire Will Set You Free | Yony Leyser | 2015 | U.S. distribution |
| AI-3 | Violet | Bas Devos | 2014 | 2017 Blu-ray release |
| AI-4 | Baby Bump | Kuba Czekaj | 2015 | 2017 Blu-ray release |
| AI-5 | Doors Cut Down | Antonio Hens | 2000 | |
| AI-6 | A Closer Walk With Thee | John C. Clark and Brie Williams | 2017 | 2017 Blu-ray release |
| AI-7 | Center of My World | Jakob M. Erwa | 2016 | 2017 Blu-ray release |
| AI-8 | Brothers of the Night | Patric Chiha | 2016 | 2017 Blu-ray release |
| AI-9 | Sleeping Giant | Andrew Cividino | 2015 | 2018 Blu-ray release |
| AI-10 | John From | João Nicolau | 2015 | 2018 Blu-ray release |
| AI-11 | The Poet and the Boy | Kim Yang-Hee | 2017 | U.S. distribution |
| AI-12 | The Wild Boys | Bertrand Mandico | 2017 | U.S. distribution |
| AI-13 | Queercore: How to Punk a Revolution | Yony Leyser | 2017 | U.S. distribution |
| AI-14 | Permanent Green Light | Dennis Cooper and Zac Farley | 2018 | 2018 Blu-ray release |
| AI-15 | Knife + Heart | Yann Gonzalez | 2018 | U.S. distribution |
| AI-16 | The Erlprince | Kuba Czekaj | 2016 | 2019 Blu-ray release |
| AI-17 | Tiger Milk | Ute Wieland | 2017 | U.S. distribution rights |
| AI-18 | The Harvesters | Etienne Kallos | 2018 | U.S. distribution |
| AI-19 | You'll Never Be Alone | Alex Anwandter | 2016 | 2020 Blu-ray release |
| AI-20 | Luz | Tilman Singer | 2018 | 2020 Blu-ray release |
| AI-21 | Equation to an Unknown | Frantz Salieri | 1980 | |
| AI-22 | Home | Fien Troch | 2016 | 2020 Blu-ray release |
| AI-23 | Starfish | A.T. White | 2018 | 2020 Blu-ray release |
| AI-24 | House of Cardin | P. David Ebersole and Todd Hughes | 2019 | 2020 DVD release |
| AI-25 | Rapture in Blue | Ryder Houston | 2020 | DVD release |
| AI-26 | Love Express: The Disappearance of Walerian Borowczyk | Kuba Mikurda | 2018 | U.S. distribution |
| AI-27 | Madame | Stéphane Riethauser | 2019 | Blu-ray release |
| AI-28 | Queer Japan | Graham Kolbeins | 2019 | North American distribution |
| AI-29 | Altered Innocence Vol. 1 | Cam Archer, Anna Cazenave Cambet, Antonio Hens, Yann GOnzalez, Caroline Poggi, Jonathan Vinel, Shaun Hughes, Peter Strickland, Alexis Langlois, Bertrand Mandico, João Nicolau, Gjertrud Maria Bergaust | 2000 - 2019 | |
| AI-30 | Adoration | Fabrice du Welz | 2019 | U.S. distribution |
| AI-31 | So Long Billie (Pompei) | Anna Falguères and John Shank | 2019 | 2021 Blu-ray release |
| AI-32 | Sound and Fury | Jean-Claude Brisseau | 1988 | |
| AI-33 | A Dim Valley | Brandon Colvin | 2020 | U.S. distribution |
| AI-34 | Wild Tigers I Have Known | Cam Archer | 2006 | |
| AI-35 | Death of Nintendo | Raya Martin | 2020 | DVD release |
| AI-36 | LA Plays Itself | Fred Halsted | 1972 | |
| AI-36 | Sex Garage | Fred Halsted | 1972 | |
| AI-36 | Sextool | Fred Halsted | 1975 | |
| AI-37 | Arrebato (Rapture) | Iván Zulueta | 1979 | |
| AI-38 | Pals (Colegas) | Eloy de la Iglesia | 1982 | |
| AI-39 | Hypnosis | Valery Todorovsky | 2020 | Blu-ray release |
| AI-40 | Stop-Zemlia | Kateryna Gornostai | 2021 | U.S. distribution |
| AI-41 | My Best Part | Nicolas Maury | 2020 | U.S. distribution |
| AI-42 | The Islands of Yann Gonzalez | Yann Gonzalez | 2006 - 2021 | |
| AI-42 | You and the Night | Yann Gonzalez | 2013 | |
| AI-43 | Passing Strangers | Arthur J. Bressan, Jr. | 1974 | |
| AI-43 | Forbidden Letters | Arthur J. Bressan, Jr. | 1979 | |
| AI-44 | Apocalypse After: Short Films by Bertrand Mandico | Bertrand Mandico | 1999 - 2018 | |
| AI-45 | Beyond Gravity | Garth Maxwell | 1989 | |
| AI-45 | Jack Be Nimble | Garth Maxwell | 1993 | |
| AI-46 | After Blue (Dirty Paradise) | Bertrand Mandico | 2021 | North American distribution |
| AI-47 | Saturday Night at the Baths | David Buckley | 1975 | |
| AI-48 | Grand Jeté | Isabelle Stever | 2022 | U.S. distribution |
| AI-49 | Élisa | Jean Becker | 1995 | |
| AI-50 | Dressed in Blue | Antonio Giménez Rico | 1983 | |
| AI-51 | Brother's Keeper | Ferit Kerahan | 2021 | U.S. distribution |
| AI-52 | Wild Reeds | André Téchiné | 1994 | |
| AI-53 | Beautiful Beings | Guðmundur Arnar Guðmundsson | 2022 | U.S. distribution |
| AI-54 | The Wounded Man | Patrice Chéreau | 1983 | |
| AI-55 | Irreversible | Gaspar Noé | 2002 | |
| AI-56 | Altered Innocence Vol. 2 | Osama Chami, Enrique Gimeno, William Laboury, Mathia Broe, Alexis Langlois, Adam Baran, Sam Max, Christian Tafdrup, Érica Sarmet, Christian Zetterberg, Naïla Guiguet, Sarah Veltmeyer | 2008 - 2021 | |
| AI-57 | Hidden Pleasures | Eloy de la Iglesia | 1977 | |
| AI-57 | Confessions of a Congressman | Eloy de la Iglesia | 1978 | |
| AI-58 | The Hole in the Fence | Joaquín del Paso | 2021 | U.S. distribution |
| AI-59 | Name Above Title | Carlos Conceição | 2020 | |
| AI-59 | Other Tales of Woe by Carlos Conceição | Carlos Conceição | 2010 - 2023 | |
| AI-60 | Coming Out | Heiner Carow | 1989 | |
| AI-61 | Astrakan | David Depesseville | 2022 | North American distribution |
| AI-62 | Fögi is a Bastard | Marcel Gisler | 1998 | |
| AI-63 | Stielke, Heinz, Fifteen | Michael Kann | 1987 | |
| AI-64 | The Strangler (L'Étrangleur) | Paul Vecchiali | 1970 | |
| AI-65 | Gay USA | Arthur J. Bressan, Jr. | 1977 | |
| AI-65 | Snapshots of 1970s LGBT Resistance | Lilli Vincenz, Sharon Hayes, Kate Millett, Ronald Chase, Wakefield Poole | 1970 - 1974 | |
| AI-66 | She Is Conann | Bertrand Mandico | 2023 | North American distribution |
| AI-67 | Sitcom | François Ozon | 1998 | |
| AI-67 | Criminal Lovers | François Ozon | 1999 | |
| AI-67 | Water Drops on Burning Rocks | François Ozon | 2000 | |
| AI-68 | The People's Joker | Vera Drew | 2022 | North American distribution |
| AI-69 | You Are Not Alone | Lasse Nielsen and Ernst Johansen | 1978 | |
| AI-70 | Suicide Room | Jan Komasa | 2011 | |
| AI-71 | Le Beau Mec | Wallace Potts | 1979 | |
| AI-72 | Endless Summer Syndrome | Kaveh Daneshmand | 2023 | |
| AI-73 | Eat the Night | Caroline Poggi, Jonathan Vinel | 2024 | |
| AI-74 | Juice | Arthur J. Bressan, Jr. | 1984 | |
| AI-74 | Daddy Dearest | Arthur J. Bressan, Jr. | 1984 | |
| AI-75 | Lost Country | Vladimir Perišić | 2023 | |
| AI-76 | Queens of Drama | Alexis Langlois | 2024 | |
| AI-77 | The Maiden | Graham Foy | 2022 | |
| AI-78 | So Unreal | Amanda Kramer | 2023 | |
| AI-79 | Zappa | Bille August | 1983 | |
| AI-79 | Twist and Shout | Bille August | 1984 | |
| AI-80 | Taxi zum Klo | Frank Ripploh | 1980 | |

== Short Film Collections ==
| Spine Number | Collection Title | Film title | Director | Release Year | Notes |
|---|---|---|---|---|---|
| AI-29 | Altered Innocence Vol. 1 | Our Time | Cam Archer | 2004 | |
| AI-29 | Altered Innocence Vol. 1 | Grabber Lover | Anna Cazenave Cambet | 2016 | |
| AI-29 | Altered Innocence Vol. 1 | Doors Cut Down | Antonio Hens | 2000 | |
| AI-29 | Altered Innocence Vol. 1 | Les Vacances Continuent | Yann Gonzalez | 2015 | |
| AI-29 | Altered Innocence Vol. 1 | After School Knife Fight | Caroline Poggi & Jonathan Vinel | 2017 | |
| AI-29 | Altered Innocence Vol. 1 | Bunny | Shaun Hughes | 2018 | |
| AI-29 | Altered Innocence Vol. 1 | GU04 | Peter Strickland | 2019 | |
| AI-29 | Altered Innocence Vol. 1 | Terror, Sisters! | Alexis Langlois | 2019 | |
| AI-29 | Altered Innocence Vol. 1 | Niemand | Bertrand Mandico | 2019 | |
| AI-29 | Altered Innocence Vol. 1 | Gambozinos (Wild Haggis) | João Nicolau | 2013 | |
| AI-29 | Altered Innocence Vol. 1 | Jakt (Hunt) | Gjertrud Maria Bergaust | 2018 | |
| AI-42 | The Islands of Yann Gonzalez | We Will Never Be Alone Again | Yann Gonzalez | 2012 | |
| AI-42 | The Islands of Yann Gonzalez | I Hate You Little Girls | Yann Gonzalez | 2008 | |
| AI-42 | The Islands of Yann Gonzalez | By the Kiss | Yann Gonzalez | 2006 | |
| AI-42 | The Islands of Yann Gonzalez | Three Celestial Bodies | Yann Gonzalez | 2009 | |
| AI-42 | The Islands of Yann Gonzalez | Intermission (Entracte) | Yann Gonzalez | 2007 | |
| AI-42 | The Islands of Yann Gonzalez | Land of My Dreams | Yann Gonzalez | 2012 | |
| AI-42 | The Islands of Yann Gonzalez | Islands | Yann Gonzalez | 2017 | |
| AI-42 | The Islands of Yann Gonzalez | Fou de Bassan | Yann Gonzalez | 2021 | |
| AI-44 | Apocalypse After: Short Films by Bertrand Mandico | The Blue Cavalier | Bertrand Mandico | 1999 | |
| AI-44 | Apocalypse After: Short Films by Bertrand Mandico | He Says He's Dead... | Bertrand Mandico | 2006 | |
| AI-44 | Apocalypse After: Short Films by Bertrand Mandico | The Life and Death of Henry Darger | Bertrand Mandico | 2010 | |
| AI-44 | Apocalypse After: Short Films by Bertrand Mandico | Boro in the Box | Bertrand Mandico | 2011 | |
| AI-44 | Apocalypse After: Short Films by Bertrand Mandico | Living Still Life | Bertrand Mandico | 2012 | |
| AI-44 | Apocalypse After: Short Films by Bertrand Mandico | Prehistoric Cabaret | Bertrand Mandico | 2013 | |
| AI-44 | Apocalypse After: Short Films by Bertrand Mandico | Salammbô | Bertrand Mandico | 2014 | |
| AI-44 | Apocalypse After: Short Films by Bertrand Mandico | Our Lady of Hormones | Bertrand Mandico | 2015 | |
| AI-44 | Apocalypse After: Short Films by Bertrand Mandico | Any Virgin Left Alive? | Bertrand Mandico | 2015 | |
| AI-44 | Apocalypse After: Short Films by Bertrand Mandico | Depressive Cop | Bertrand Mandico | 2015 | |
| AI-44 | Apocalypse After: Short Films by Bertrand Mandico | Ultra Pulpe (Apocalypse After) | Bertrand Mandico | 2018 | |
| AI-56 | Altered Innocence Vol. 2 | Young Diego | Osama Chami & Enrique Gimeno | 2021 | |
| AI-56 | Altered Innocence Vol. 2 | Yandere | William Laboury | 2019 | |
| AI-56 | Altered Innocence Vol. 2 | Amphi | Mathias Broe | 2018 | |
| AI-56 | Altered Innocence Vol. 2 | The Demons of Dorothy | Alexis Langlois | 2021 | |
| AI-56 | Altered Innocence Vol. 2 | Trade Center | Adam Baran | 2021 | |
| AI-56 | Altered Innocence Vol. 2 | Chaperone | Sam Max | 2022 | |
| AI-56 | Altered Innocence Vol. 2 | Awakening | Christian Tafdrup | 2008 | |
| AI-56 | Altered Innocence Vol. 2 | A Wild Patience Has Taken Me Here | Érica Sarmet | 2021 | |
| AI-56 | Altered Innocence Vol. 2 | Shower Boys | Christian Zetterberg | 2021 | |
| AI-56 | Altered Innocence Vol. 2 | Dustin | Naïla Guiguet | 2020 | |
| AI-56 | Altered Innocence Vol. 2 | Kiem Holijanda | Sarah Veltmeyer | 2017 | |
| AI-59 | Other Tales of Woe by Carlos Conceição | Bad Bunny | Carlos Conceição | 2017 | |
| AI-59 | Other Tales of Woe by Carlos Conceição | Versailles | Carlos Conceição | 2013 | |
| AI-59 | Other Tales of Woe by Carlos Conceição | Turquoise Boy | Carlos Conceição | 2023 | |
| AI-59 | Other Tales of Woe by Carlos Conceição | Goodnight Cinderella | Carlos Conceição | 2014 | |
| AI-59 | Other Tales of Woe by Carlos Conceição | Hell | Carlos Conceição | 2011 | |
| AI-59 | Other Tales of Woe by Carlos Conceição | The Flesh | Carlos Conceição | 2010 | |
| AI-65 | Snapshots of 1970s LGBT Resistance | Gay and Proud | Lilli Vincenz | 1970 | |
| AI-65 | Snapshots of 1970s LGBT Resistance | Gay Power | Sharon Hayes and Kate Millett | 1971 | |
| AI-65 | Snapshots of 1970s LGBT Resistance | Parade | Ronald Chase | 1972 | |
| AI-65 | Snapshots of 1970s LGBT Resistance | Freedom Day Parade | Wakefield Poole | 1974 | |
