= Karoline Rose Sun =

German musician

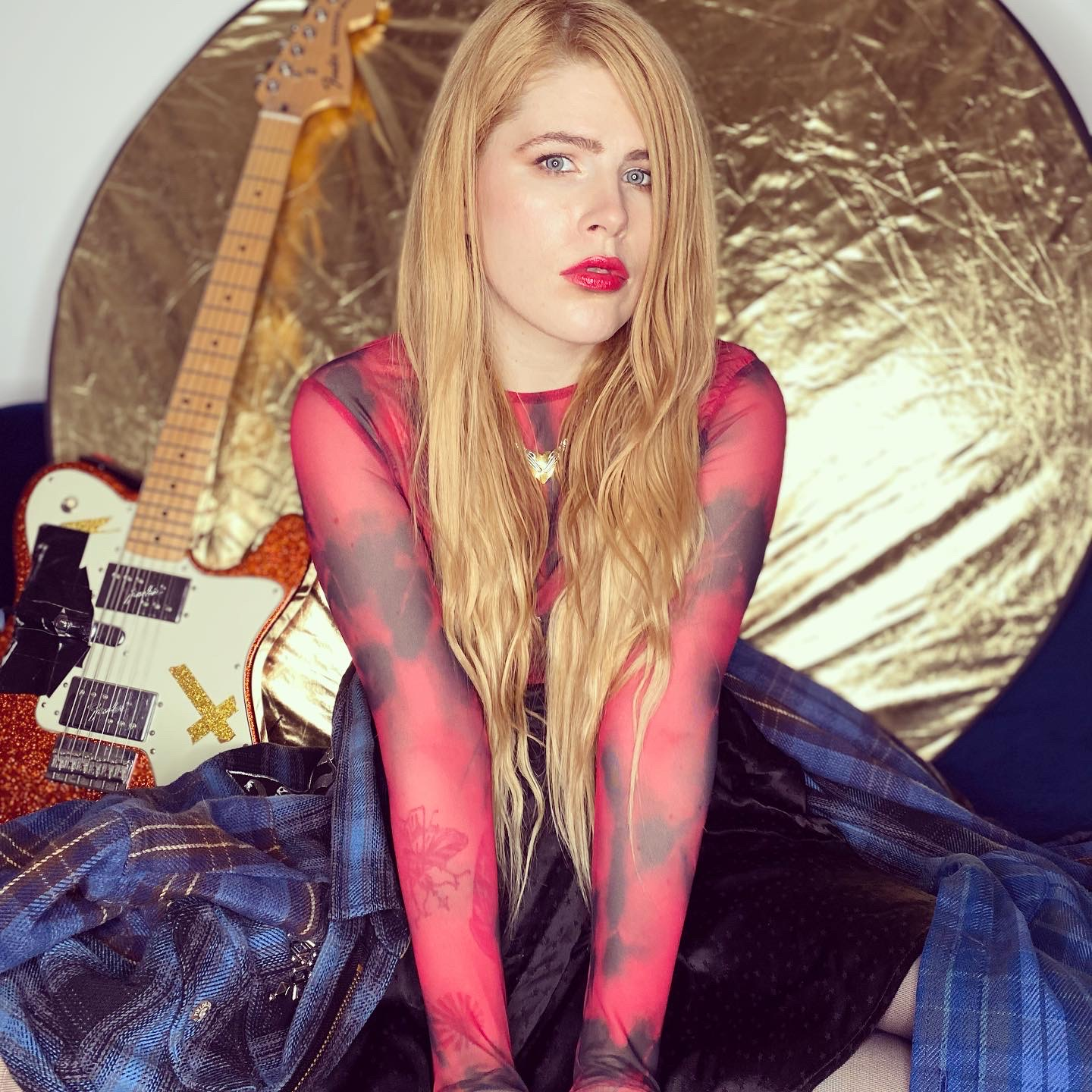
Sun with her Fender Telecaster Deluxe in 2021

Karoline Rose Sun, also known as SUN, is a German singer-songwriter and guitarist who was born in Karlsruhe, Germany. Her individual style, called "brutal pop", combines pop songs with metal influences, which she performs under the name SUN. She has performed in death metal shows, musicals, contemporary theater, and film, using her voice and growl/scream technique.

In 2021, SUN played the role of a blacksmith, singer, and guitarist in Tony Gatlif’s film Tom Medina, which premiered in the Official Selection at the 2021 Cannes Film Festival. She composed five songs for the film's soundtrack.

SUN was among the 2021 session 2 selections by FAIR, a French non-profit organization in support of musical artists.

== Early life ==
Born in Karlsruhe, Germany (Baden-Württemberg), she moved to France as a teenager. At the age of twelve she discovered her growl/scream technique and soon started touring with local rock bands.

== Music ==
Sun began her career between Germany and France as a growler, singer, and guitarist in the Brutal Death Metal band Psychobolia.

In 2010, she released her first solo EP More Immoral under the pseudonym Caroline Rose.

In 2013, she participated in the TV show The Voice on TF1 (as part of Florent Pagny’s team), reaching the final stage.

In 2014, she was shortlisted to represent Germany at the Eurovision Song Contest. At the preselection—broadcast on NDR—she sang the song Amber Sky, ultimately coming in second.

The same year, she collaborated with singer Babx on her EP EP#1 which she performed under the name Karoline Rose, and which was released on the label Bison Bison. The video clip for the single "Testosteron" was shot in the Black Forest, near her native village.

In 2016 and 2017, she opened for Nina Hagen, Jeanne Added, Poni Hoax, and Vick Moan.

Brutal Pop, her first EP under her current name SUN, was produced by Dan Lévy, producer of The Dø. The first SUN show took place at Rock en Seine Paris festival in August 2017.

In May 2019, SUN played at the Great Escape Festival in Brighton, and at the Trans Musicales in Rennes in December.

She has collaborated with the contemporary orchestra Geneva Camerata for a series of Metallica covers arranged by pianist and conductor David Greilsammer.

On May 26, 2021, SUN released the single "Golden". The track was co-produced and mixed by three-time Grammy Award winner Andrew Scheps, known for his work with Adele, Metallica, Beyoncé, Red Hot Chili Pepper, and U2.

== Cinema ==
In Tony Gatlif’s 2021 film Tom Medina, she played the role of Stella, blacksmith, singer, and guitarist. The film was part of the Official Selection at the 2021 Cannes Film Festival. In a concert performed before the first screening on a beach in Cannes, she sang with Nicolas Reyes, founder of the Gipsy Kings, bassist Bernard Paganotti, as well as gypsy musicians and the flamenco dancer Karine Gonzalez. The film was released on August 4, 2021 (Les Films du losange).

In 2023, Sun was cast as Ultra Lux in Bertrand Mandico's She Is Conann, based on Conan the Barbarian, and as Audrey in Vincent Must Die.

In 2024, she appeared in Mandico's film Dragon Dilatation.

== Performing arts ==
Using the pseudonym Caroline Rose, she began her performing arts career in 2009 with Arcosm company La mécanique des anges, which toured across France. In her musical choreography, she sang, growled, played guitar, and danced alongside artists from different artistic disciplines.

She was spotted by musical producers Dove Attia and Albert Cohen who cast her in the role of Solene in 1789: Les Amants de la Bastille, directed by Giuliano Pepparini. The show was performed at the Palais des Sports arena in Paris.

In 2015, director Guillaume Vincent offered her the role of the Countess of Geschwitz in his Mimi, Scènes de la vie de Bohème at the Théâtre des Bouffes du Nord, (Midi Minuit company). She played and sang alongside Camélia Jordana and other opera singers, to music by Giaccomo Puccini reinterpreted by Frédéric Verrière.

From 2016 to 2017, she played Edith Piaf in the play Piaf, une vie en rose et noir by Jacques Pessis (directed by François Chouquet).

In 2016, she appeared in H to H (Marion Aubert, Roland Auzet) at the Avignon Festival where she played the character of Nina Hagen in dialogue with Michel Houellebecq. In 2019, she acted, sang, played guitar, and wrote music for two plays by Roland Auzet: Hedda Gabbler, d'habitude on supporte l'inévitable (Henrik Ibsen) alongside L.E.J., and Nous l'Europe, banquet des peoples (text by Laurent Gaudé) performed at the Festival d'Avignon 2019.

== Music for films and musicals ==
In 2021, she composed five tracks for the soundtrack of Tony Gatlif’s film Tom Medina: "Through The Pain", "Paso Dobles", Goodbye, "Ultra Fauve", and "Pena".

In 2017, Sun wrote the music for Littéral, a ballet by choreographer Daniel Larrieu (Astrakan company).

== Literature ==
Director Pascale Henry asked Sun to write a text for the 2021 edition of Les Intrépides, an event initiated by the SACD. The book includes texts by Sun and six other authors: Marie Nimier, Carole Martinez, Odile Cornuz, Alice Zeniter, Aiko Solovkine and Céline Champinot. The texts were read by the authors at the Chartreuse de Villeneuve Les Avignon, and at the Conservatoire du grand Avignon during the Festival d’Avignon 2021, in a production by Pascale Henry and with music by Sun. The book was published by L’avant scène théâtre.

== Collaborations ==
Sun regularly collaborates with the Geneva Camerata Orchestra, conducted by pianist David Greilsammer. In 2018, they played The Metallica Journey, covering Metallica songs arranged for orchestra by Jonathan Kerren. In 2020, they shot a live video for a cover of Soundgarden’s Black Hole Sun.

In December 2021, they performed a tribute to Radiohead in Geneva. The video of Creep was released in early 2022, featuring SUN and cellist Ekachai Maskulrat.
