= Dragon Dilatation =

2024 film by Bertrand Mandico

- Directed by: Bertrand Mandico
- Screenplay by: Bertrand Mandico
- Produced by: Antoine Garnier
- Starring: Elina Löwensohn; Christophe Bier; Nathalie Richard; Clara Benador; Yuming Hey; Ekaterina Ozhiganova; Sandra Parfait; Pacôme Thiellement; Karoline Rose Sun; Julia Riedler; Camille Rutherford; Claire Duburcq
- Cinematography: Nicolas Eveilleau; Sylvain Verdet
- Edited by: Laure Saint-Marc; Helio Pu
- Music by: Pierre Desprats
- Production companies: Orphée Films; Venin Films; Ecce Films
- Release date: 8 August 2024 (Locarno)
- Running time: 114 minutes
- Country: France
- Languages: French; English; Japanese

Dragon Dilatation is a 2024 experimental French film written and directed by Bertrand Mandico. Shot in split-screen format, it combines two film essays: a free adaptation of Igor Stravinsky's ballet Petrouchka, and footage from a cancelled stage production rehearsed at the Théâtre Nanterre-Amandiers titled The Deviant Comedy. The film explores subjects such as the Russo-Ukrainian war, police violence in France, totalitarianism across Europe, the #MeToo movement, and sexual abuse in the modelling and fashion industries. The film had its world premiere at the 77th Locarno Film Festival out of competition on 8 August 2024.

== Premise ==
The two essays presented in the film, Petrouchka and The Deviant Comedy, address subjects such as the Russo-Ukrainian war, police violence in France, totalitarianism across Europe, the #MeToo movement, and sexual abuse in the modelling and fashion industries.

== Cast ==
- Elina Löwensohn
- Christophe Bier
- Nathalie Richard
- Clara Benador
- Yuming Hey
- Ekaterina Ozhiganova
- Sandra Parfait
- Pacôme Thiellement
- Karoline Rose Sun
- Julia Riedler
- Camille Rutherford
- Claire Duburcq

== Production ==
The film was written and directed by Bertrand Mandico; produced by Antoine Garnier with Mandico, Flavien Giorda and Emmanuel Chaumet serving as co-producers; Nicolas Eveilleau and Sylvain Verdet serving as cinematographers; Laure Saint-Marc and Helio Pu as editors, and Pierre Desprats composed the score. It was produced by Orphée Films and co-produced by Venin Films, Ecce Films and Nanterre-Amandiers Centre Dramatique Nationale; with international sales handled by Kinology.

Both films were commissioned to Mandico. Initially. he would not combine the two films. The adaptation of Igor Stravinsky's ballet Petrouchka was commissioned by the Aix-en-Provence Festival, while Philippe Quesne invited Mandico to create The Deviant Comedy at the Théâtre Nanterre-Amandiers and told him: "Make cinema on stage; it will serve as a show." Mandico took advantage of this opportunity to prepare the film She Is Conann (2023) that he was writing at the time, and wrote a show that portrayed a double, Octavia, who questions She Is Conann and begins rehearsing with actresses. The show ended up not happening because of the COVID-19 pandemic, but Mandico decided to film what it was supposed to be originally and it became The Deviant Comedy. Both films explore subjects such as the Russo-Ukrainian war, police violence in France, totalitarianism across Europe, the #MeToo movement, and sexual abuse in the modelling and fashion industries.

== Release ==
The film had its world premiere at the 77th Locarno Film Festival out of competition on 8 August 2024.

== Reception ==
Muriel Del Don of Cineuropa wrote; "Dragon Dilatation is - like all of Mandico’s movies – a bewildering, erotic-decadent and always incredibly poetic journey into fluid worlds (in all senses of the term), where reality as we know it crumbles away before eventually tumbling down."

Martin Kudlac of ScreenAnarchy wrote; "Dragon Dilatation is primarily for Mandico's dedicated fans and completists, showcasing his foray into stage performance and his engagement with performance art beyond the cinematic medium. While under ordinary circumstances these works might have appeared as DVD/Blu-ray extras or part of a retrospective, the festival's decision to present them on the big screen is fitting. It highlights Locarno's openness to avant-garde and experimental film hybrids, as both Mandico's pieces can be categorized as film essays."
