= Another Girl, Another Planet (disambiguation) =

"Another Girl, Another Planet" is a song by The Only Ones.

Another Girl, Another Planet may also refer to:

- Another Girl Another Planet (film)
- Another Girl, Another Planet, a Bernice Summerfield novel
- "Another Girl, Another Planet", My Lady Jane episode
