= After Blue =

2019 sci-fi film by Bertrand Mandico

- Release poster
- French: After Blue (Paradis sale)
- Directed by: Bertrand Mandico
- Written by: Bertrand Mandico
- Screenplay by: Bertrand Mandico
- Produced by: Emmanuel Chaumet
- Starring: Elina Löwensohn; Paula Luna; Vimala Pons; Agata Buzek
- Cinematography: Pascale Granel
- Edited by: George Cragg
- Music by: Pierre Desprats
- Production companies: Ecce Films; Ha My Productions
- Distributed by: Altered Innocence
- Release date: August 2021
- Running time: 129 minutes
- Country: France
- Language: French

After Blue, also called After Blue (Dirty Paradise) (French: After Blue (Paradis sale)), is a 2021 French science-fiction fantasy film written and directed by Bertrand Mandico.

== Plot ==
In an undetermined future, Roxy is a teenage girl who lives in a community with her mother, Zora, on the planet After Blue, a planet inhabited only by women. One day on a beach, Roxy and other girls from her community encounter a woman named Kate Bush stuck in the sand. Despite suggestion from the others that Kate Bush may be a criminal undergoing punishment, Roxy helps her and sets her free. Roxy sees Kate Bush has one hairy arm and an eye on her mons pubis and becomes infatuated with her, but Kate immediately resumes her criminal activities. Roxy and her mother are held responsible and are exiled from the community, tasked with murdering Kate Bush if they wish to return. Roxy and Zora encounter dangerous people and environments as they traverse the lands in search of their bounty.

== Cast ==
- Elina Löwensohn as Zora
- Paula Luna as Roxy
- Vimala Pons as Sternberg
- Agata Buzek as Kate Bush
- Michaël Erpelding as Olgar 2
- Mara Taquin as Chiara
- Claïna Clavaron as Luz
- Claire Duburcq as Ivresse

== Production ==
=== Filming ===
Principal photography began on 12 November 2019, occurring over seven and a half weeks, the movie was shot with 35 mm film. Filming largely took place in Corrèze and Creuse, France, while the beach scenes were filmed near La Tremblade, Charente-Maritime. A hangar in Brive-la-Gaillarde was used as a studio set.

== Reception ==
=== Critical Response ===
Film review aggregate Rotten Tomatoes reports that 74% of critics gave the film a positive rating, based on 50 reviews with an average score of 6.2/10. The site's consensus reads, "its overwhelming inscrutability may begin to feel more like a bug than a feature for some viewers, but After Blue is nothing if not original." Metacritic assigned the film a weighted average score of 52 out of 100, based on 12 reviews from mainstream critics, considered to be "mixed or average". Jude Dry, writing for IndieWire, gave the film a B score, describing the film as "a kaleidoscopic fantasy warped through the lens of a 1970s sci-fi Western, 'After Blue' is a synthetic siren song for the freaks of the future and the past."

=== Awards ===
Award	Category	Ref
74th Locarno Film Festival	FIPRESCI prize	
Fantastic Fest 2021	Best Film	
Sitges Film Festival 2021	Special Jury Prize	
Sitges Film Festival 2021	José Luis Guarner Critic's Award	
