= Nathalie Richard =

French actress (born 1963)

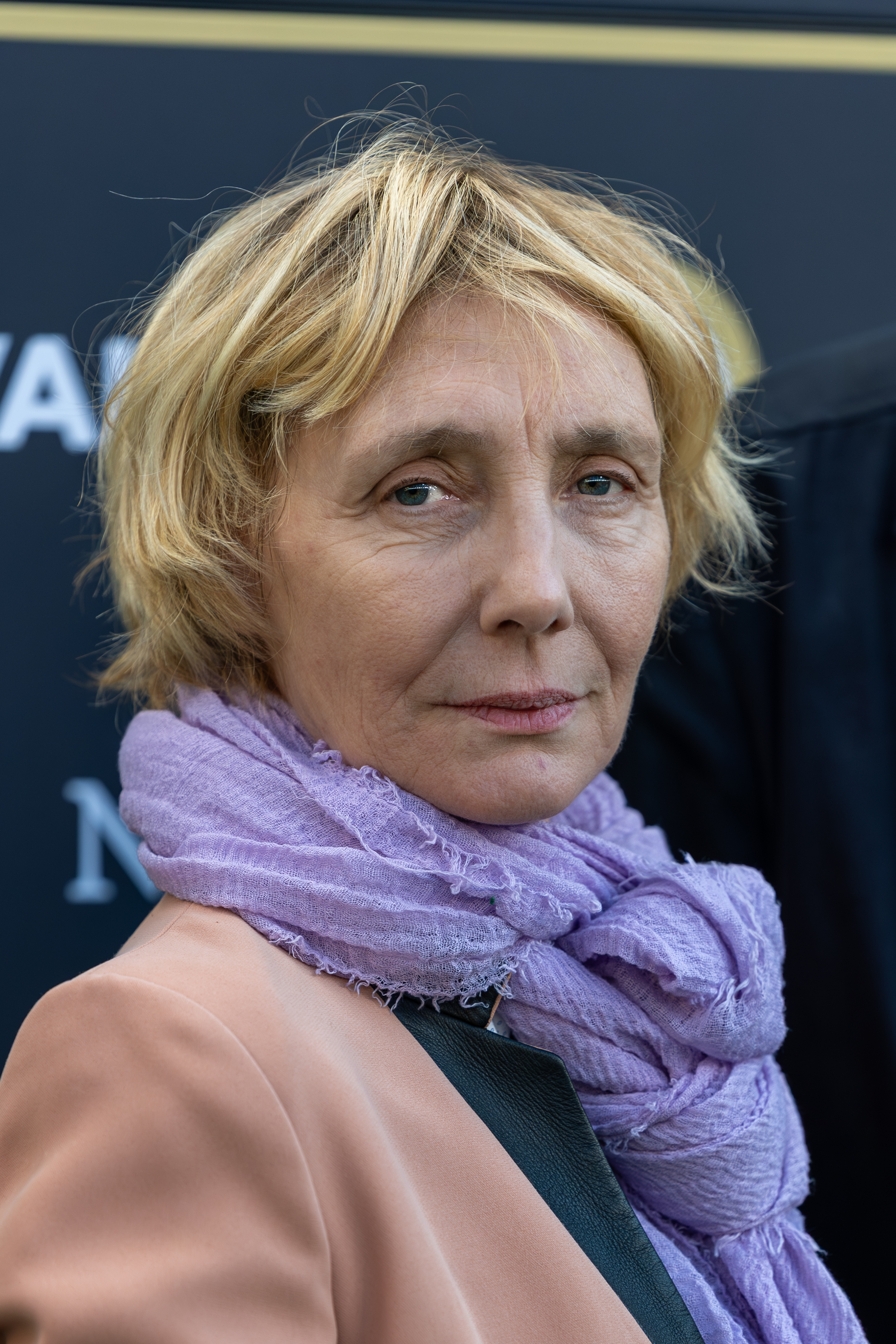
- Nathalie Richard on the Green Carpet at the 2025 Zurich Film Festival.
- Born: Paris, France
- Occupation: Actress
- Years active: 1983–present

Nathalie Richard is a French actress.

== Early life and education ==
Nathalie Richard was born in Paris, France. As a child, she practised dance and ice-skating.

She spent a year in New York with the Karole Armitage company, returning to join the Conservatoire national supérieur d'art dramatique and graduating in 1986.

== Career ==
Since graduating in 1986, Richard has worked regularly in both cinema and theatre, her first major role being Viviane in Catherine Corsini's Les Amoureux in 1993.

In 2018, alongside Liza Blanchard she took one of the principal roles in the staging of Anne Théron, created at the TNS of the play À la trace of Alexandra Badea which explores mother-daughter relations. The performance, in dialogue with pre-recorded audio-visual projections, was lauded by the press., breaking down the barriers between theatre and film.

== Recognition and awards ==
Richard received the Michel Simon Prize for most promising actress/actor for her role in the 1988 Jacques Rivette film Gang of Four.

== Filmography ==
=== Film ===
Year	Title	Role	Notes
1986	Window Shopping	La coiffeuse #6	
1987	Le Panorama		
1988	La bande des quatre	Cécile	Michel-Simon Prize 1989 (for Most Promising Actress)
1989	Winter's Child	Leni	
1989	La Jalousie		short
1989	Constance		short
1990	Monsieur	L'hôtesse d'accueil	
1990	Les dernières heures du millénaire		
1991	Cendrillon 90		short
1991	Bar des rails	Monique, the waitress	
1992	Riens du tout	Claire	
1992	Interdit d'amour	Mme Brémont	television film
1992	Weep No More, My Lady	Alicia	
1992	C'est trop con!	Jeanne	short
1993	Grand bonheur	Charly	
1993	Légendes de la forêt viennoise		
1993	Le linge sale		short
1994	Les amoureux	Viviane	
1994	Jeanne la Pucelle II - Les prisons	Catherine de la Rochelle	Cut version did not include her scene
1994	Comme un dimanche		short
1995	Up, Down, Fragile (Haut bas fragile)	Ninon	third film for Rivette
1995	Le Soleil a promis de se lever demain		short
1995	Lumière and Company (Lumière et compagnie)	Ninon	section directed by Rivette
1996	Irma Vep	Zoé	
1996	L'éducatrice	Louise	
1996	51 raisons		short
1996	Youth Without God (Jeunesse sans Dieu)		
1997	La vie en face	Claire	television film
1997	Eau douce	Marianne	
1998	Les Enfants de Scarlett	Kate	
1998	Late August, Early September (Fin août, début septembre)	Maryelle	
1998	A Soldier's Daughter Never Cries	Mademoiselle Fournier	
1998	Stolen Life (Voleur de vie)	Yann's wife	
1999	Afraid of Everything	Anne	
1999	Bruno n'a pas d'agent		short
1999	Le pourboire (ou la pitié)	Béatrice	short
2000	Confusion of Genders (La Confusion des genres)	Laurence Albertini	
2000	30 Years	Barbara	
2000	Pretend I'm Not Here (Faites comme si je n'étais pas là)	Carole	
2000	Modern Comforts (Confort moderne)	Irène	
2000	Code Unknown (Code inconnu)	Mathilde	
2000	La famille médicament	La mère	short
2001	Imago	Marianne	
2001	Mon meilleur amour	Corinne	short
2001	L'hiver sera rude	Solange	
2001	They Call This... Spring (On appelle ça... le printemps)	A naiad	
2002	Merci Docteur Rey	Radio Interviewer	
2002	Froid comme l'été	Claire	television film
2002	Nearest to Heaven (Au plus près du paradis)	Brigitte	
2002	Novo	Sabine	
2002	Étrangère	La serveuse	
2002	Maintenant	Else	short
2003	Les visages		short
2003	Le Divorce	Charlotte de Persand	
2003	La chaîne du froid	Client	short
2003	Le ventre de Juliette	Fafa	
2005	The Passenger	Suzanne	
2005	Belhorizon	Isabelle	
2005	Zim and Co.	Zim's mother	
2005	Caché	Mathilde	
2005	Les Enfants	Hélène	
2006	Le Pressentiment	Gabrielle Charmes-Aicquart	
2007	Parc	Hélène Clou	
2008	Le Plaisir de chant	Noémie	
2009	Une petite zone de turbulences	Psychiatrist	
2010	Never Let Me Go	Madame	
2012	Les Fraises des bois	The mother of Violette	
2013	Jeune and Jolie	Véronique	
2013	Violette	Hermine	
2015	The Great Game (Le Grand Jeu)	Pauline	
2017	Ma vie avec James Dean	Sylvia van den Rood	third film for Choisy
2017	Les Garçons sauvages	Teacher	
2017	Happy End	Estate agent	third film for Haneke
2020	After Love	Geneviève	
2022	Neneh Superstar	Jeanne-Marie Meursault	
2023	She Is Conann	Conann (Age 55)	
2023	Doppelgänger	Helga Steiner	
2023	A Place to Fight For (Une zone à défendre)	Séverine	
2023	The Animal Kingdom	Professor Valérie Beaudoin	
2024	Dragon Dilatation		
2024	Bonjour Tristesse		
2025	Affection Affection	Rita	

=== Television ===
Year	Title	Role	Notes
2000	Scénario sur la drogue	La mère	"Famille médicament, La"
2005	3 femmes... un soir d'été	Isabelle	
2022	Irma Vep	Ondine	Episode 3 'Dead Man's Escape' (fourth film for Assayas)
