= Nadja (film) =

- Theatrical release poster
- Directed by: Michael Almereyda
- Written by: Michael Almereyda
- Produced by: Mary Sweeney; Amy Hobby
- Starring: Suzy Amis; Galaxy Craze; Martin Donovan; Peter Fonda; Karl Geary; Jared Harris; Elina Löwensohn
- Cinematography: Jim Denault
- Edited by: David Leonard
- Music by: Simon Fisher Turner
- Production company: Kino Link Company
- Distributed by: October Films
- Release dates: September 13, 1994 (TIFF); September 1, 1995 (United States)
- Running time: 93 minutes
- Country: United States
- Language: English
- Budget: $1 million
- Box office: $443,169

Nadja is a 1994 American vampire art movie written and directed by Michael Almereyda, starring Elina Löwensohn in the title role and Peter Fonda as Abraham Van Helsing.

== Plot ==
Count Dracula dies of a stake in his heart. His daughter, Nadja, shows up to claim the body, hoping that his death will free her from the life he has forced on her. She has the body cremated and prepares to take the ashes to Brooklyn and pay a visit to her twin brother Edgar. Before she departs, she stops for a drink and meets Lucy, a similarly disillusioned young woman. They leave the bar and have sex.

Following his killing of Dracula, Van Helsing has been jailed, and his nephew, Jim (who is also Lucy's husband) bails him out. When Van Helsing learns that Dracula's body has been removed from the morgue, he enlists his nephew's help to destroy it properly, and thus ensure Dracula will never return.

Meanwhile, Nadja visits Edgar, who is sick, and meets his nurse and live-in lover, Cassandra. Nadja persuades Cassandra to move Edgar to her apartment and plans to heal him by transfusing him with plasma from the blood of shark embryos; Edgar revives enough to drink some of Nadja's blood.

Lucy has fallen under Nadja's trance. She leads Jim and Van Helsing to Edgar's house, where Nadja is staying with Renfield. Edgar awakens and warns Cassandra that she is in danger. Cassandra, revealed to be Van Helsing's daughter, attempts to escape with Nadja pursuing her, Lucy pursuing Nadja, and Jim pursuing Lucy. Cassandra runs into a gas station, where two mechanics attempt to protect her, but Nadja mesmerizes them and kills one of them. A policeman enters the gas station and shoots Nadja in the abdomen.

Edgar, who is improving, unites with the Van Helsings to stop Nadja. He receives a "psychic fax" from Nadja, telling him that she is injured and must return to Transylvania with Cassandra. As they approach the castle, Nadja begins a transfusion of Cassandra's blood while she sleeps. Edgar and Helsing drive a stake through Nadja's heart. Lucy is released, Nadja is destroyed, and Cassandra awakens.

Despite the assumed happy ending, Nadja narrates the epilogue: "They cut off my head... burned my body... no one knew... no one suspected that I was now alive in Cassandra's body. Edgar and I were married at City Hall... there is a better way to live."

== Cast ==
- Elina Löwensohn as Nadja
- Peter Fonda as Van Helsing
- Suzy Amis as Cassandra
- Galaxy Craze as Lucy
- Martin Donovan as Jim
- Karl Geary as Renfield
- Jared Harris as Edgar
- David Lynch as Morgue Attendant (cameo)
- Nic Ratner as Bar Victim
- Jack Lotz as Boxing Coach
- Isabel Gillies as Waitress
- Jose Zuniga as Bartender
- Bernadette Jurkowski as Dracula's Bride
- Jeff Winner as Young Dracula
- Bob Gosse as Garage Mechanics
- Rome Neal as Garage Mechanics
- Giancarlo Roma as Romanian Kid
- Anna Roma as Romanian Mother
- Thomas Roma as Romanian Policemen
- Aleksandar Rasic as Romanian Policemen
- Miranda Russell as Lucy's Baby

== Production ==
Nadja was written by Michael Almereyda after a planned project called Fever (centered around Edgar Allan Poe) failed to attract financing. The 1928 surrealist novel Nadja by André Breton served as an inspiration for the thematic approach, with Almereyda also studying several classic vampire films and lore. Even with a comparatively more commercial script than Fever, the production still faced hurdles in acquiring financing due to the decision to film Nadja in black and white rather than color, which was deemed necessary as both a cost-saving measure and thematically important. When financing fell through, David Lynch financed the entire film himself.

To attain a "blurry, out of focus" look to convey the point of view of the living dead, Almereyda shot part of the film using a Fisher-Price PixelVision camcorder. Almereyda attempted to make the film in a similar style to Roger Corman, with the Corman-produced Poe films a particular source of inspiration for not only style and tone, but frugal film-making. The movie was filmed over the course of five and a half weeks in New York City. An abandoned hospital on Central Park West was used to simulate a Transylvanian castle.

== Reception ==
On the review aggregator website Rotten Tomatoes, Nadja holds an approval rating of 70% based on 30 reviews. The website's critics' consensus reads: "Nadja approaches the Dracula legend from an idiosyncratic angle – and with just enough visual style to overcome uneven storytelling."

Roger Ebert, writing for the Chicago Sun-Times, gave the film a rating of two-and-a-half out of four stars, characterizing it as "an example of a genre we can call Deadpan Noir. It's the kind of movie that deals with unspeakable subjects while keeping a certain ironic distance and using dialogue that seems funny, although the characters never seem in on the joke."
