= Isabel Gillies =

American author and actress (born 1970)

- Born: Isabel Boyer Gillies; 1969 or 1970 (age 56–57); New York City, U.S.
- Occupations: Author, actress
- Years active: 1990–2011; 2021; 2023; 2025 (acting)
- Spouses: DeSales Harrison (m. 1999; div. 2005) Peter Lattman (m. 2007)
- Children: 3

Isabel Boyer Gillies (born 1969 or 1970) is an American author and actress. She played Kathy Stabler, Elliot Stabler's wife in Law & Order: Special Victims Unit. Her memoir Happens Every Day was a New York Times bestseller, and her most recent book is Cozy.

== Early life and education ==
As a student, Gillies struggled with severe dyslexia. She graduated from New York University with a BFA in film. Gillies is the daughter of Archibald and Linda Gillies.

== Career ==
=== Acting ===
Gillies landed her first movie role when Whit Stillman cast her as Cynthia McLean in his pioneering independent film, Metropolitan (1990). Other film credits include Finley in Another Girl Another Planet (1992), Alison in I Shot Andy Warhol (1996), Moira Ingalls in On Line (2002), Isabel in Happy Here and Now (2002), and Kathryn in New Orleans, Mon Amour (2008).

Prior to her role as Kathy Stabler on SVU, which she played from 1999 to 2011, Gillies appeared in "Bad Girl," an episode of the original Law & Order series, playing Monica Johnson, a young woman who murders an undercover police officer and then undergoes a religious conversion during her trial and is born again. In 2000, she played the role of Alison in the short-lived Fox series, The $treet.

In 2021, she reprised her role as Kathy Stabler for one episode during season 22 of SVU; the cross-over episode that launched Law & Order: Organized Crime. The hostile online reaction of SVU fans to her character's death led Gillies to discuss how fandom had changed due to social media. She has since reappeared in flashbacks, most recently in 2025.

=== Books ===
In addition to writing for a number of news outlets, including The Los Angeles Times The New York Times, Gillies has four books to her credit.

Her 2009 memoir, Happens Every Day, is about her leaving New York City to follow her first husband to Oberlin College. Happens Every Day was a New York Times bestseller. It was featured by Starbucks as a nationwide selection for its book program. NPR's Fresh Air selected it as a Top Ten Book of 2009. Her follow-up memoir, A Year and Six Seconds, was published in 2011.

In 2014, Gillies tried her hand with fiction with Starry Night. This young-adult novel was published by Farrar, Straus & Giroux in September 2014.

In 2019, she returned to non-fiction with Cozy. This was published by Harper Wave. The New York Times Book Review said of it, "For Gillies, coziness is a state of mind, the environments we create in our homes to feel at ease. Think of her as a companion to Marie Kondo, filling up all those spaces once they've been decluttered."

== Personal life ==
She was married to DeSales Harrison, an English professor at Oberlin College, from 1999 to 2005. Gillies married Peter Lattman, an editor at The New York Times, on October 13, 2007. Gillies spends her summers in Islesboro, Maine.

== Filmography ==
=== Film ===
Year	Title	Role	Notes
1990	Metropolitan	Cynthia McLean	
1992	Another Girl Another Planet	Finley	
1994	Nadja	Waitress	
1995	Comfortably Numb	Ashely Van Dyne	
1996	I Shot Andy Warhol	Alison	
1996	One Way Out	Betsy	
1997	Wishful Thinking	Susan - Roommate	
1998	Chocolate for Breakfast	K.C.	
2001	The Girl Under the Waves	Isabel	
2002	On Line	Moira Ingalls	
2002	Happy Here and Now	Isabel	
2008	New Orleans, Mon Amour	Kathryn	

=== Television ===
Year	Title	Role	Notes
1998	Law & Order	Monica Johnson	Episode: "Bad Girl"
1998	Sex and the City	Elaine	Episode: "Bay of Married Pigs"
1999–2021	Law & Order: Special Victims Unit	Kathy Stabler	Recurring role
2000	The Street	Alison	3 episodes
2021; 2023 & 2025	Law & Order: Organized Crime	Kathy Stabler	3 episodes
