= Diana Reiter =

Polish architect (1902–1943)

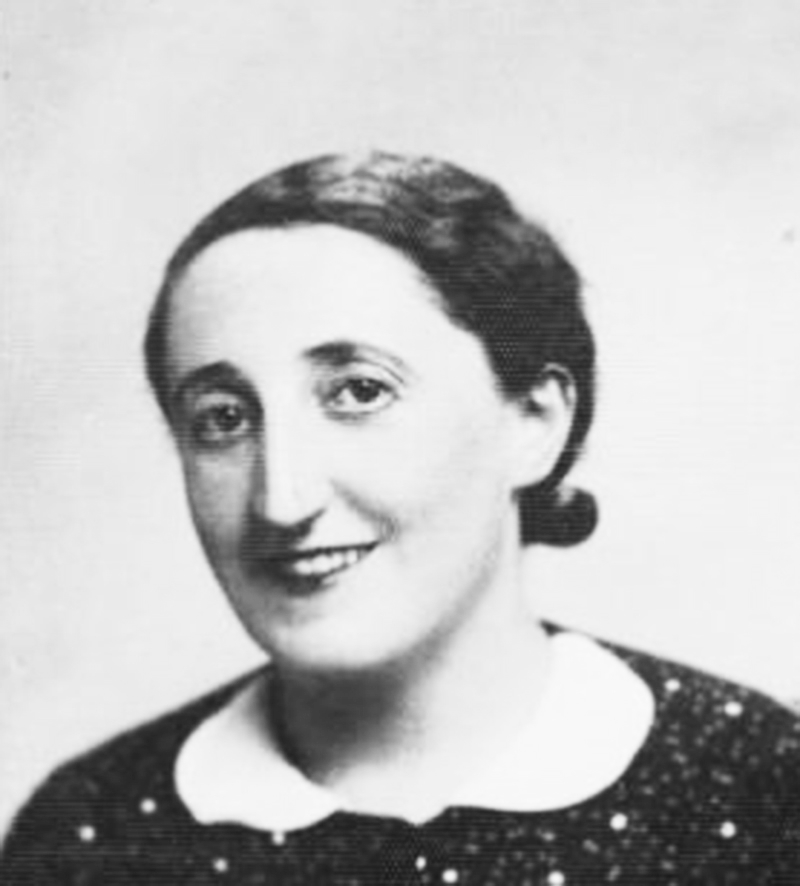
- Born: Diana Julia Reiter; 6 November 1902; Drohobych, Austria-Hungary
- Died: August 1943 (aged 40); Kraków, German-occupied Poland
- Education: Lviv Polytechnic (grad. 1927)
- Occupation: Architect
- Known for: Victim of the Holocaust

Diana Julia Reiter (6 November 1902 – August 1943), also known as Diana Reiterówna, was a Polish-Jewish architect. A graduate of Lviv Polytechnic, she was one of the first female architects in Kraków. In 1943, she was killed at the Kraków-Płaszów concentration camp during the Holocaust.

== Biography ==
Diana Julia Reiter was born on 6 November 1902 in Drohobych, Kingdom of Galicia and Lodomeria, into a wealthy assimilated Jewish family. She was the youngest of four daughters of Abraham Reiter and Sophie Heimberg. In 1927, Reiter graduated from the Faculty of Architecture at Lviv Polytechnic; she was one of 15 female graduates of that faculty between 1919 and 1930.

From 1928 to 1931, Reiter worked at the Directorate of Public Works of the Provincial Office in Kraków with two other architects: Zdzisław Kowalski and Adam Moscheni. From 1930 to 1931, she was a technical officer, giving opinions on the designs of newly built buildings in Krynica and dealing with appeals against decisions of the Kraków construction authorities. In 1928, the project she worked on with Kowalski and Moscheni was ranked third in the competition for the building of the Jagiellonian Library. At the request of the provincial conservator of monuments, she dealt with the restoration of the royal castle in Niepołomice. Due to the region's dwindling economic situation, however, she was dismissed at the end of 1931.

A year later, she began working at the office of Kazimierz Kulczyński, making architectural drawings until 1934. During this period, she was a member of the Union of Architects of the Kraków Province, renamed the Association of Architects of the Republic of Poland and the Union of Jewish Engineers (after 1937). Two buildings designed by her are extant: at 28 Beliny-Prażmowskiego Avenue (1933–1935) and 16 Pawlikowskiego Street (1937–1939)—a tenement house constructed for Józef and Eleonora Elsner.

== Death ==
Reiter lived with her mother at Królewska until the establishment of the Kraków Ghetto in 1941, two years after the German invasion of Poland during World War II. When it was liquidated, she was moved to the Kraków-Płaszów concentration camp, where she was murdered by Oberscharführer Albert Hujar in 1943, as part of the Holocaust.

== In popular culture ==
Reiter was portrayed by Romanian-Jewish actress Elina Löwensohn in the 1993 film Schindler's List, in which she is shot dead on the orders of Austrian S.S. officer Amon Göth following an argument over the foundation of the camp's barracks being built improperly.

== Completed projects gallery ==
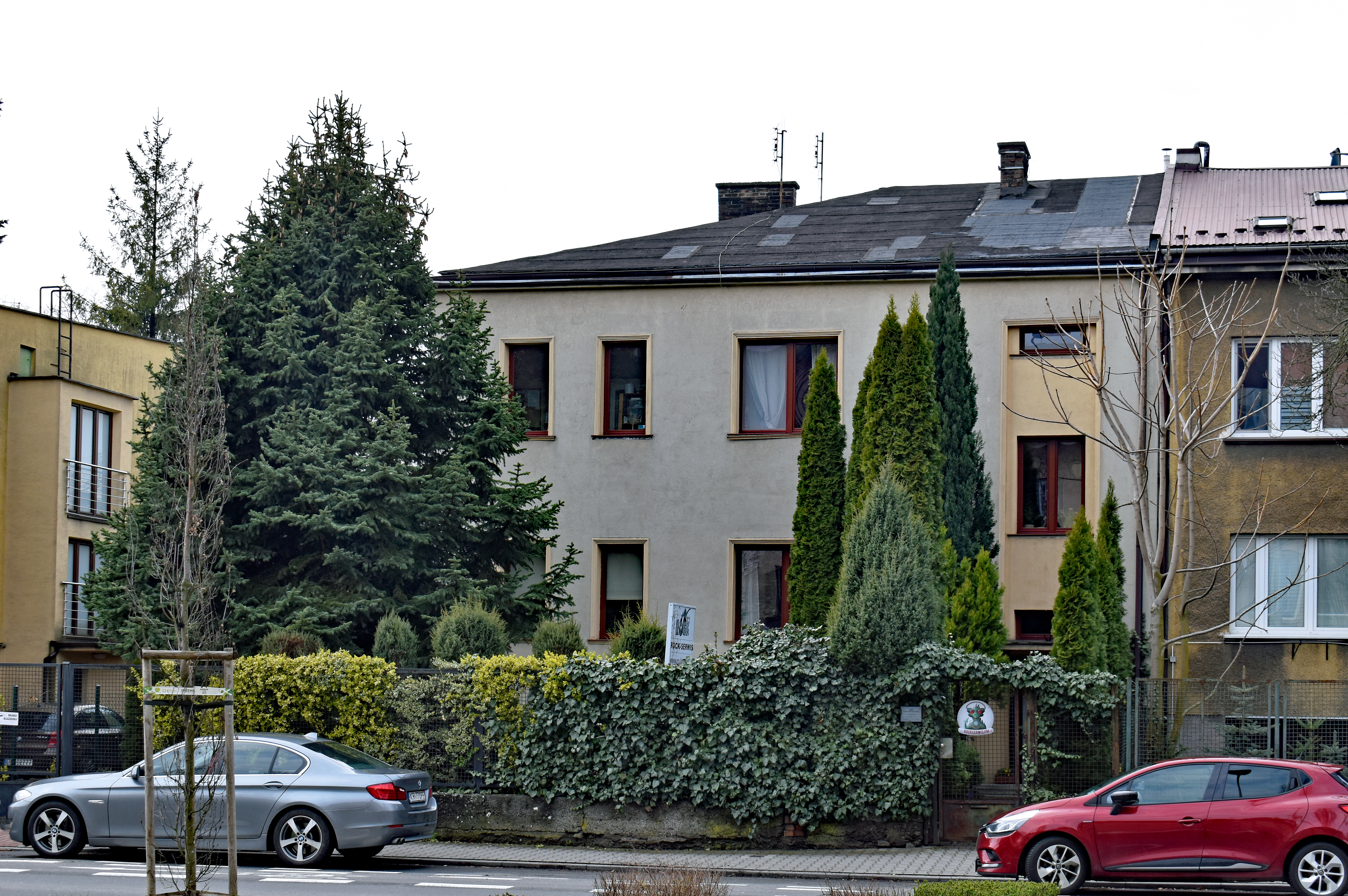
Villa (1934)
28 Beliny-Prażmowskiego Avenue, Kraków

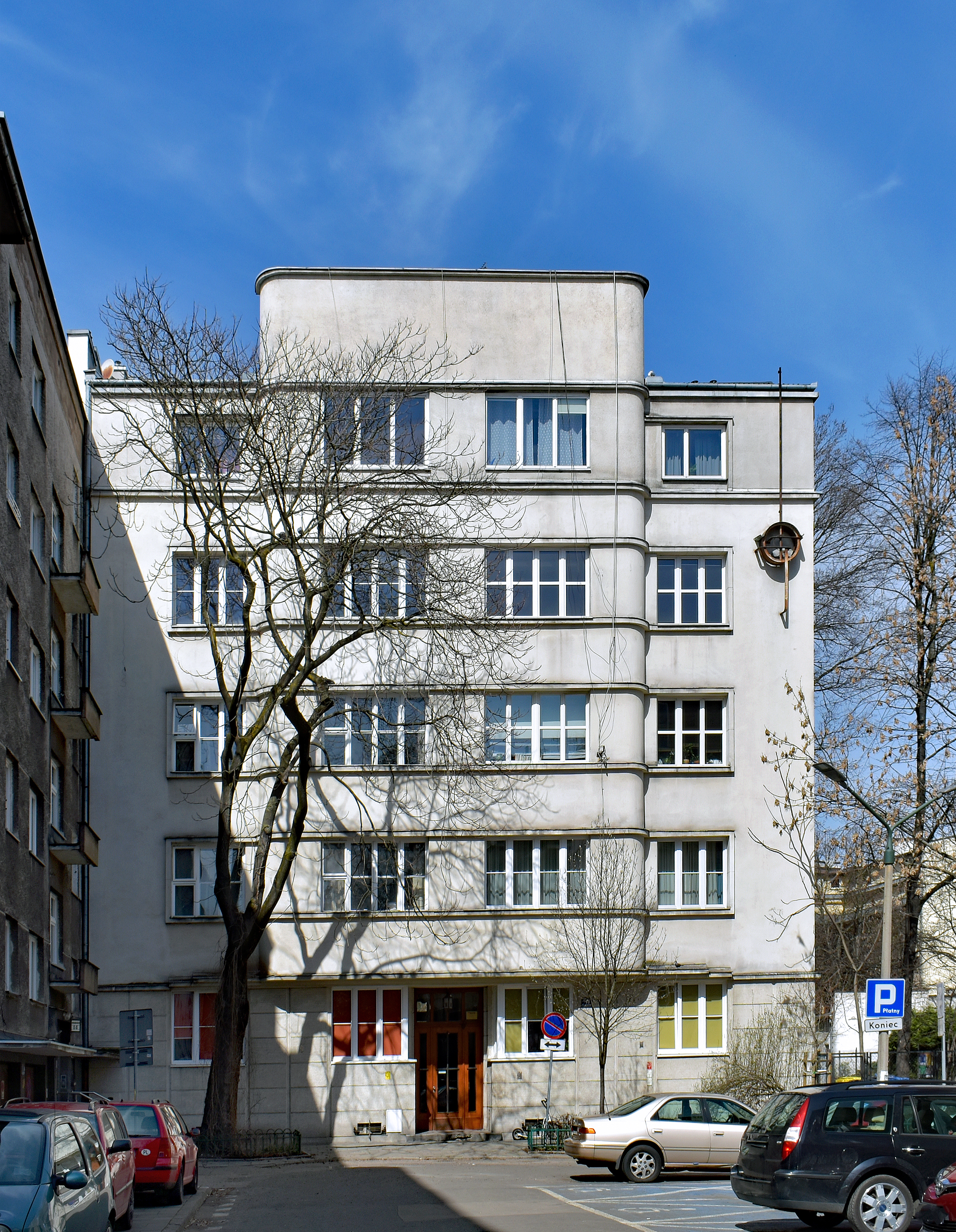
Elsners tenement house (1938)
16 Pawlikowskiego Street, Kraków

== Bibliography ==
- (in Polish) * Barbara Zbroja Leksykon architektów i budowniczych pochodzenia żydowskiego w Krakowie w latach 1868-1939, Wydawnictwo Wysoki Zamek, Kraków 2023, ISBN 978-83-966500-2-3 page 172-181 (Lexicon of architects and builders of Jewish origin in Krakow in the years 1868-1939)
