= Don't Let Me Die (film) =

2025 Romanian mystery film

- Promotional poster
- Romanian: Nu mă lăsa să mor
- Directed by: Andrei Epure
- Screenplay by: Andrei Epure; Ana Gheorghe
- Produced by: Ana Gheorghe; Alexandru Teodorescu
- Starring: Cosmina Stratan; Elina Löwensohn; Silvia Debu; Mihaela Sirbu
- Cinematography: Laurențiu Raducanu
- Edited by: Dragoș Apetri
- Music by: Dale Cooper Quartet & the Dictaphones
- Production companies: Saga Film; Handplayed; Tomsa FilmsArrogant Films
- Distributed by: Lights On
- Release date: 12 August 2025 (Locarno)
- Running time: 108 minutes
- Countries: Romania; Bulgaria; France
- Language: Romanian

Don't Let Me Die (Romanian: Nu mă lăsa să mor) is a 2025 mystery drama film co–written and directed by Andrei Epure in his feature debut. The film starring Cosmina Stratan, follows Maria, who gets entangled in a maze of bureaucracy and affairs of dead neighbour, when the corpse of her neighbour is found in front of her apartment window.

An international co-production among Romania, Bulgaria, and France, the film had its world premiere at the 78th Locarno Film Festival on 12 August 2025, in the Filmmakers of the Present Competition section, where it competed for Golden Leopard – Filmmakers of the Present

== Cast ==
- Cosmina Stratan as Maria
- Elina Löwensohn as Isabela
- Silvia Debu
- Mihaela Sirbu
- Ozana Oancea
- Gabriel Albert Costea
- Elias Ferkin
- Lucian Pavel
- Isabela Neamtu as Irina
- Ana Dumitrascu
- Ioana Crăciunescu
- Cezar Grumăzescu
- Georgi Yordanov

== Production ==
Development

In 2022, writer-director Andrei Epure conceived the idea for the film while riding a bus. He overheard a conversation between strangers about a Romanian journalist who had been found dead in her apartment, two weeks after her death. Struck by the tragedy, he was inspired to create a film that would “explore the anguish of passing away in complete indifference.” The project developed at the 44th Cannes’ Résidence du Festival, held from 1 March to 15 July 2022, had production commitment from Bucharest-based Saga Film and co-production by Paris-based Tomsa Films. It was scheduled for filming in 2024.

== Release ==
Don't Let Me Die had its world premiere in the 'Filmmakers of the Present Competition' section of the 78th Locarno Film Festival on 12 August 2025, vying for the Golden Leopard – Filmmakers of the Present.

It will compete in Meet the Neighbors Competition section at the Thessaloniki International Film Festival in November 2025.

== Accolades ==
Award	Date of ceremony	Category	Recipient	Result	Ref.
Locarno Film Festival	16 August 2025	Golden Leopard – Filmmakers of the Present	Don't Let Me Die	Nominated	
