= Suedama Ensemble =

The Suedama Ensemble is a chamber orchestra based in New York City.

It was founded in 2005 by the pianist and conductor David Greilsammer. The orchestra is made up of young musicians from many nationalities and backgrounds. Its repertoire goes from early baroque to contemporary music. The Suedama ensemble has made 2 recordings for the French label Naïve:

== Discography ==
- Mozart Early Piano Concertos, Naïve, 2006, David Greilsammer piano and conductor
- Mozart Piano Concertos nos. 22 and 24, Naïve, 2009, David Greilsammer piano and conductor

== Awards ==
- CD of the year, 2007, Daily Telegraph
- Supersonic Award, 2008, Pizzicato Magazine
