= Jim Denault =

American cinematographer

Jim Denault is an American cinematographer.

Graduating from the Rochester Institute of Technology in 1982 with a bachelor's degree in photo illustration, he would move to New York City in 1989 and worked in the camera department of several independent films. Denault first served as cinematographer for Michael Almereyda's 1992 film Another Girl Another Planet.

Notable credits for Denault include Kimberly Peirce's Boys Don't Cry, Matt Dillon's directorial debut City of Ghosts, and would work frequently with Jay Roach in film and television for Recount, Dinner for Schmucks, Game Change, The Campaign, Trumbo, All the Way and Coastal Elites.

Denault received two Primetime Emmy Award nominations for his work on Carnivàle and Game Change, as well as a nomination for the Independent Spirit Award for Best Cinematography for his work on Nadja.

== Filmography ==
=== Film ===
| Year | Title | Director | Notes |
|---|---|---|---|
| 1992 | Another Girl Another Planet | Michael Almereyda | 1st of 3 collaborations with Almereyda |
| 1994 | River of Grass | Kelly Reichardt | |
| 1995 | Nadja | Michael Amereyda | Nominated - Independent Spirit Award for Best Cinematography |
| 1996 | Layin' Low | Danny Leiner | |
| 1996 | Sudden Manhattan | Adrienne Shelly | |
| 1997 | Clockwatchers | Jill Sprecher | |
| 1998 | Illtown | Nick Gomez | |
| 1998 | Too Tired to Die | Wonsuk Chin | |
| 1998 | The Book of Life | Hal Hartley | |
| 1998 | The Eternal | Michael Amereyda | |
| 1999 | Taxman | Avi Nesher | |
| 1999 | A Good Baby | Katherine Dieckmann | |
| 1999 | Boys Don't Cry | Kimberly Peirce | |
| 1999 | Getting to Know You | Lisanne Skyler | |
| 2000 | Our Song | Jim McKay | |
| 2000 | Chasing Sleep | Michael Walker | |
| 2001 | The Believer | Henry Bean | |
| 2002 | Real Women Have Curves | Patricia Cardoso | |
| 2002 | City of Ghosts | Matt Dillon | |
| 2004 | Maria Full of Grace | Joshua Marston | |
| 2005 | Heights | Chris Terrio | |
| 2006 | The Night of the White Pants | Amy Talkington | |
| 2007 | Freedom Writers | Richard LaGravenese | |
| 2007 | Hounddog | Deborah Kampmeier | Co-cinematographer with Edward Lachman |
| 2008 | The Sisterhood of the Traveling Pants 2 | Sanaa Hamri | |
| 2010 | She's Out of My League | Jim Field Smith | |
| 2010 | Dinner for Schmucks | Jay Roach | |
| 2011 | Butter | Jim Field Smith | |
| 2012 | The Campaign | Jay Roach | |
| 2015 | Pitch Perfect 2 | Elizabeth Banks | |
| 2015 | Trumbo | Jay Roach | |
| 2016 | My Big Fat Greek Wedding 2 | Kirk Jones | |
| 2016 | Bad Moms | Jon Lucas; Scott Moore | |
| 2018 | The Grizzlies | Miranda de Pencier | |
| 2019 | What Men Want | Adam Shankman | |

=== Television ===
| Year | Title | Notes |
|---|---|---|
| 2002 | Push, Nevada | 1 episode |
| 2005 | Carnivàle | 6 episodes Nominated - Primetime Emmy Award for Outstanding Cinematography for a Series (One Hour) |
| 2005 | Six Feet Under | 6 episodes |
| 2008 | Recount | Television film 1st of 7 collaborations with Jay Roach |
| 2009 | In Plain Sight | 15 episodes |
| 2009 | Royal Pains | 7 episodes |
| 2011 | Suits | 6 episodes |
| 2012 | Game Change | Television film Nominated - Primetime Emmy Award for Outstanding Cinematography for a Limited or Anthology Series or Movie |
| 2013 | Clear History | Television film |
| 2013 | Muhammad Ali's Greatest Fight | Television film |
| 2013 | Getting On | 5 episodes |
| 2014 | Silicon Valley | 8 episodes |
| 2015 | Wayward Pines | 5 episodes |
| 2016 | All the Way | Television film |
| 2018 | The Looming Tower | Miniseries, 7 episodes |
| 2019 | The Affair | 6 episodes |
| 2019-2020 | Yellowstone | 7 episodes |
| 2020 | Coastal Elites | Television film |
| 2021-2025 | Law & Order: Organized Crime | 47 episodes |

== Accolades ==
| Year | Award | Category | Title | Result |
|---|---|---|---|---|
| 1995 | Independent Spirit Awards | Best Cinematography | Nadja | Nominated |
| 2005 | Primetime Emmy Awards | Outstanding Cinematography for TV Series | Carnivàle (Note: For episode "The Road to Damascus") | Nominated |
| 2012 | Primetime Emmy Awards | Outstanding Cinematography for TV Movie | Game Change | Nominated |
| 2017 | American Society of Cinematographers | Outstanding Achievement in Cinematography for Television | All the Way | Nominated |
