= La Loi de la jungle =

- Theatrical release poster
- Directed by: Antonin Peretjatko
- Written by: Antonin Peretjatko; Frédéric Ciriez; Maud Ameline
- Produced by: Alice Girard
- Starring: Vincent Macaigne; Vimala Pons; Pascal Légitimus; Mathieu Amalric; Jean-Luc Bideau; Fred Tousch
- Cinematography: Simon Roca
- Edited by: Antonin Peretjatko; Xavier Sirven
- Production companies: Rectangle Productions; France 3 Cinéma; Orange Studio; Scope Pictures; Imav Editions
- Distributed by: Haut et Court
- Release dates: 9 June 2016 (Cabourg); 15 June 2016 (France)
- Running time: 99 minutes
- Country: France
- Language: French
- Budget: $6 million
- Box office: $668.000

La Loi de la jungle (French pronunciation: [la lwa də la ʒœ̃ɡl], literally The law of the Jungle; English title: Struggle for Life) is a 2016 French comedy film directed by Antonin Peretjatko. It stars Vincent Macaigne, Vimala Pons, Pascal Légitimus and Mathieu Amalric. The film is set in French Guiana, where it was also shot on location.

== Cast ==
- Vincent Macaigne as Marc Châtaigne
- Vimala Pons as Tarzan
- Pascal Légitimus as Duplex
- Mathieu Amalric as Galgaric
- Jean-Luc Bideau as Rosio
- Fred Tousch as Friquelin
- Rodolphe Pauly as Damien
- Pascal Tagnati as Ulrich
- Thomas de Pourquery as Georges
- Philippe Laudenbach as De Rostiviec
