= Shelley (2016 film) =

2016 film

- Film poster
- Directed by: Ali Abbasi
- Written by: Ali Abbasi; Maren Louise Käehne
- Produced by: Jacob Jarek
- Starring: Ellen Dorrit Petersen; Cosmina Stratan; Peter Christoffersen
- Cinematography: Nadim Carlsen; Sturla Brandth Grøvlen
- Edited by: Olivia Neergaard-Holm
- Music by: Martin Dirkov
- Release dates: 14 February 2016 (Berlin); 1 December 2017 (Denmark)
- Running time: 92 minutes
- Country: Denmark
- Languages: Danish; English

Shelley is a 2016 Danish drama horror film directed and co-written by Ali Abbasi (in his feature directorial debut) and stars Ellen Dorrit Petersen and Peter Christoffersen as a couple who, faced with the inability to bear children, arrange for their Romanian maid (Cosmina Stratan) to be a surrogate mother, soon leading to increasingly sinister events as the due date approaches. It was shown in the Panorama section at the 66th Berlin International Film Festival.

== Plot ==
A young Romanian woman, Elena, is hired as a housekeeper for a Danish couple, Louise and Kasper. While wealthy, the couple chooses to live in a lakehouse without electricity, grow their own food, and raise chickens. Their only connection to the outside world is a landline phone. Louise is recovering from surgery and requires some extra help around the house. Although Elena feels uncomfortable with the unusual isolation of the house, she otherwise fits in easily. She also meets Leo, a spiritual healer and friend of Louise who tries to help Louise recover more quickly by purging the bad energy from her body.

Elena and Louise quickly bond, and Elena tells Louise that she is saving money so that she and her son, who currently live with Elena's parents, can have a home of their own. Louise in turn confides her difficulties in conceiving a child of her own. Louise asks if Elena would agree to be a surrogate mother for her and Kasper. In exchange, they would buy an apartment for Elena after she gave birth. To the chagrin of her parents, Elena agrees and is implanted with one of Louise's frozen eggs.

Though assured by her doctor that everything is going fine, Elena begins to feel unusual after the implantation and notices a number of bizarre events: the chickens become terrified of her, she begins to hallucinate sounds and images, and she suffers from nightmares. In one of these, she gives birth to a dead baby; in another, a blood-drenched Louise talks to her about someone named "Shelley." As the pregnancy progresses, Elena loses weight, is constantly exhausted, develops bloody gums, and experiences unusual and unwholesome pregnancy cravings that disturb her. Leo, trying to help Elena through her difficult pregnancy, senses bad energy coming from her belly. Elena believes that the baby is killing her, but when she voices her concerns to her doctor, she insists that the baby is healthy and that all her difficulties are normal. She also reveals that her baby is a girl, but when Elena asks to see an ultrasound, the machine mysteriously breaks down.

As the pregnancy progresses, Elena's condition worsens until she is in almost constant pain, forcing Louise to become her caretaker. One night during a bath, Elena reacts with pain when the water touches her, causing her to snap and beat at her own belly while screaming that she wants the child out. Later that night, Louise finds Elena wandering around in a daze, having attacked and attempted to eat a live chicken from their coop. Louise fears that if Elena returns home, her parents will keep her and the baby forever. They agree to keep Elena at the lakehouse and care for her until the child is born, but one afternoon, when Louise leaves Elena unattended, she returns to find that Elena has attempted to give herself an abortion with a knitting needle. Elena dies of internal bleeding, but the baby is unharmed.

Kasper and Louise name the baby Shelley and Louise instantly adores her. Shelley begins to demonstrate some of the same strange behavior as Elena: the chickens fear her, and she screams in pain when water is poured on her. When Leo visits the house, he senses such evil in Shelley that he is forced to flee, much to Louise's shock. Soon, Kasper also becomes uncomfortable around Shelley, insisting that she makes strange noises that Louise doesn't hear but which drive Kasper to a strange, shell-shocked state in which he becomes completely unresponsive, to the point that he does not even react when he accidentally cuts open his own leg while chopping wood. Louise believes none of this and is upset that Kasper doesn't seem to love their daughter.

Louise wakes in the middle of the night to find Shelly missing. Rushing outside, she finds Shelley with Kaspar, who has shut them both in the car with the engine running in an apparent murder-suicide attempt via carbon monoxide. Louise rescues Shelley and murders Kasper by slamming his head repeatedly in the car door. Shaken, Louise sits on the bed with Shelley as an unidentified figure in black stands in the room with them before suddenly disappearing. Louise and Shelley are left alone, with no explanation for the events of the film.

== Cast ==
- Björn Andrésen as Leo
- Ellen Dorrit Petersen as Louise
- Kenneth M. Christensen as Simon
- Cosmina Stratan as Elena
- Patricia Schumann as Nanna
- Peter Christoffersen as Kasper
- Marianne Mortensen as Isabella
- Marlon Kindberg Bach as Sigurd

== Reception ==
Shelley has an approval rating of 92% on review aggregator website Rotten Tomatoes, based on 12 reviews, and an average rating of 6.8/10. Metacritic assigned the film a weighted average score of 62 out of 100, based on 5 critics, indicating "generally favorable reviews".
