= Cosmina Stratan =

Romanian actress

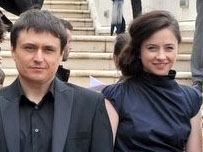
- Cristian Mungiu and Cosmina Stratan (2012)
- Born: 20 October 1984 (age 41); Iași, Romania
- Education: Caragiale National University of Theatre and Film
- Occupation: Actress
- Years active: 1986–present

Cosmina Stratan (born 20 October 1984) is a Romanian film actress. She is best known for her performance as Voichița in Beyond the Hills.

== Selected filmography ==
Film
Year	Title	Role	Notes
2012	Beyond the Hills	Voichița	
2016	Shelley	Elena	
2018	Cobain	Jadwiga	
2021	No One Gets Out Alive	Petra	
2022	Brother and Sister	Lucia	Premiered at the 75th Cannes Film Festival
2025	Don't Let Me Die	Maria	Premiered at the 78th Locarno Film Festival

== Awards ==
- Best Actress Award at the 2012 Cannes Film Festival (with Cristina Flutur).
