= Elina Löwensohn =

Romanian-American actress (born 1966)

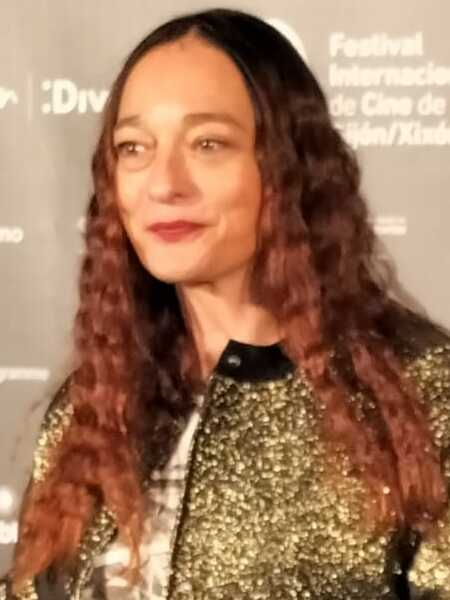
- Löwensohn in 2022
- Born: 11 July 1966 (age 60); Bucharest, Romania
- Citizenship: United States; France
- Occupation: Actress
- Years active: 1991–present
- Partner: Bertrand Mandico (c. 2010–present)

Elina Löwensohn (born 11 July 1966) is a Romanian-American actress. She has appeared in American, British and French films such as Simple Men (1992), Schindler's List (1993), Amateur (1994), Nadja (1994), Basquiat (1996), The Wisdom of Crocodiles (1998), A Very Long Engagement (2004), The Wild Boys (2017), After Blue (2021), She Is Conann (2023), and Dragon Dilatation (2024).

== Early life ==
Elina Löwensohn was born on 11 July 1966 in Bucharest, Romania. Her mother was a ballet dancer and her father worked in the government. After the death of her father, a Jewish Holocaust survivor, her mother emigrated to the United States with her when she was fourteen years old, where her mother went on a hunger strike to get a visa for her.

After finishing high school, Löwensohn studied acting at Michigan State University and at New York University's Playwrights Horizons Theater School and played in independent theatre productions.

== Career ==
Löwensohn started her film career in 1991 with the short film Theory of Achievement. Some of her notable roles are Diana Reiter in Schindler's List (1993), Katya in the 1994 Seinfeld episode "The Gymnast", Annina Nosei in Basquiat (1996), Iris in Six Ways to Sunday (1997), and Anne Levels in The Wisdom of Crocodiles (1998).

In the late 1990s, Löwensohn started working in French cinema and has since appeared in films such as Sombre (1998), Roberto Succo (2001), Doo Wop (2004), A Very Long Engagement (2004), and On War (2008).

In 2010, Löwensohn began a collaborative project with French filmmaker Bertrand Mandico named 20+1 Projections, where they are to make 21 short films in 21 years. Though each film is meant to be a unique narrative and formal work, they are to revolve around the themes of aging and desire. Their first collaboration was in Boro in a Box (2011). Löwensohn also appeared in Mandico's feature films The Wild Boys (2017), After Blue (2021), She Is Conann (2023), and Dragon Dilatation (2024).

In 2019, she played a fictionalized version of herself in Simple Women, the debut feature film of Italian director Chiara Malta.

In 2022, Löwensohn directed the short film Nothing Will Be the Same Again.

== Personal life ==
Löwensohn moved from the United States to France in the late 1990s. She holds dual American and French citizenship.

Since the 2010s, Löwensohn has been in a relationship with French filmmaker and frequent collaborator Bertrand Mandico, with whom she lives in Paris. Mandico and Löwensohn have collaborated on Mandico's 20+1 Projections, a project of 21 short films in 21 years directed by Mandico and starring Löwensohn which documents the aging process of an actress and began with Boro In The Box (2011). Mandico has described Löwensohn as his favorite actress, his artistic double and the actress he dreamed of being.

== Filmography ==
=== Film ===
Year	Title	Role	Notes
1991	Theory of Achievement		Short film
1992	Simple Men	Elina	
1992	Another Girl Another Planet	Mia	
1993	Schindler's List	Diana Reiter	
1993	Geborenka		Short film
1994	Amateur	Sofia Ludens	
1994	Nadja	Nadja	
1995	My Antonia	Antonia Shimerda	TV film
1995	Flirt	Nurse	
1995	Pictures of Baby Jane Doe	Lucinda	
1996	Basquiat	Annina Nosei	
1996	I'm Not Rappaport	Clara Lemlich	
1997	In the Presence of Mine Enemies	Rachel Heller	TV film
1997	Mauvais Genre	Lucie	
1997	Le Silence de Rak	Lucie	
1997	Six Ways to Sunday	Iris	
1997	The Other Also		Short film
1997	La fiancée	La fiancée	Short film
1998	Sombre	Claire	
1998	The Wisdom of Crocodiles	Anne Levels	
2000	Why Get Married the Day the World Ends?		
2000	The Wake	The Mother	Eight-hour long silent film
2001	Roberto Succo	Françoise Cottaz	
2001	Get Well Soon	Cindy	
2002	Portraits filmés		Short film
2002	Je n'ai jamais tué personne	Magali	Short film
2003	Quicksand	Vannessa	
2003	Intrusion	Klara	Short film
2004	Doo Wop	Maya	
2004	A Very Long Engagement	German woman	
2005	Orlando Vargas	Alice	
2005	Kitchen	La femme	Short film
2005	Dark Water	Dahlia's Mother	
2005	Hunt for Justice		TV film
2005	Teresa		Short film
2005	Histoire tragique avec fin heureuse		Short film
2006	L'immature		Short film
2006	À peine s'était-elle endormie...	Marion	Short film
2006	Fay Grim	Bebe	
2006	The Stone Council	Laura	
2006	The Little Cat Is Dead	Bettina	Short film
2007	Unloved	Maria Delmouly	TV film
2007	New Love	Alma	Short film
2007	L'institutriste		Short film
2008	Able Danger	Kasia	
2008	Wayfarer	Woman	Short film
2008	On War	Rachel	
2008	South of Heaven	Veronica	
2008	Corps perdus	Ewa	TV film
2008	D'une seule voix	Nadia	Short film
2009	Romaine 30° Below	Antonia	
2009	Corpus/Corpus	La patiente de la psy	Short film
2009	Regarder Oana	Oana	Short film
2009	Lourdes	Cécile	
2010	Des rêves pour l'hiver	Teen's Mother	
2010	Vasco		Short film
2010	J'étais à Nüremberg	Nina	TV film
2010	Black Venus	Jeanne	
2011	Declaration of War	Alex	
2011	Boro in the Box	Walerian Borowczyk	Short film
2011	Adèle's Choice	Vlora	TV film
2012	Living Still Life	Fièvre	Short film
2013	Some Place Else	Professeur Adamovitctz	TV film
2014	Prehistoric Cabaret		Short film
2014	Salammbô		Short film
2014	Souvenirs d'un montreur de seins	Le montreur de seins	Short film
2014	Le refuge	Marielle	Short film
2015	The Forbidden Room	Sister	
2015	Notre-Dame des Hormones	Lune	Short film
2015	Haldernablou - Triptyque		Short film
2015	Armorican Suite	Moon	
2015	Y a-t-il une vierge encore vivante?	Joan the Slut	Short film
2015	Parisienne	Bogdana	
2015	Le Miracle de Tekir	Lili	
2015	L'existence selon Gabriel		Short film
2015	Retour		Short film
2015	In Ecstasy		Short film
2016	Seances		Short film
2016	The Girl Without Hands	The Goddess	
2016	A Jew Must Die	Myria Bloch	
2016	Angel	Louise	
2016	Depressive Cop	The Mother	Short film
2017	Odile dans la vallée		Short film
2017	L'âne du Graveyron	La femme	Short film
2017	Let the Corpses Tan	Luce	
2017	The Wild Boys	Séverin(e)	
2018	Ni le jour, ni la nuit		
2018	The Apparition	Docteur de Villeneuve	
2018	Ultra Pulpe	Joy D'Amato	Short film
2018	Knife+Heart	Mrs. Favre	
2018	Histoire de Stefano		Short film
2019	Simple Women	Elina	
2020	Which is Witch?	Sister #2	Short film
2020	The Return of Tragedy.	Tragedy	Short film
2020	Féminisme, rafale et politique		Short film
2021	After Blue	Zora	
2021	Dead Flash		Short film
2023	She Is Conann	Rainer	
2023	The Beast	Clairvoyant	
2024	Dragon Dilatation		
2025	Don't Let Me Die	Isabela	Premiered at the 78th Locarno Film Festival

=== Television ===
Year	Title	Role	Notes
1994	Seinfeld	Katya	Episode: "The Gymnast"
2001	The Bill	Natasha Ivanova	Episode: "Common Language"
2004	Sex Traffic	Maria Danielski	Miniseries, 2 episodes
2006	Sable noir	Norma	Episode: "En attendant le bonheur"
2021	H24, 24 h de la vie d'une femme		Episode: "09H - Revenge porn"
2023	Parlement	Carmen	Season 3 and 4
