= Galaxy Craze =

British-American novelist (born 1970)

- Born: 1970 (age 55–56); London, England, U.K.
- Education: Barnard College (BA); New York University
- Occupations: Novelist, actress
- Children: 2
- Writing career
- Years active: 1991-present
- Genres: Young adult fiction Science fiction & fantasy Mystery fiction

Galaxy Craze (born 1970) is a British-American novelist and former actress.

== Early life ==
Craze was born in London, England. Her mother was 19 when Craze was born, and her father was a hairdresser during the 1960s. Her parents' marriage was tumultuous. She and her divorced mother moved to California when Craze was eight or 10 years old. She has said of her unusual name that her mother was a hippie and "I don't recommend people give their kids weird names." She has a younger brother.

Craze, her brother, and their mother lived on an ashram in Florida. Craze began attending boarding school at age 12, and her education was funded by a grandmother.

== Career ==
Craze attended Barnard College, where writing teacher Mary Gordon mentored her. As a college student, while staying at the apartment of Details magazine editor Joe Dolce, she wrote essays for the magazine, and interned at Interview magazine. She graduated with a Bachelor of Arts from Barnard in 1993.

Craze appeared as an actress in A Kiss Before Dying (1991), the Woody Allen film Husbands and Wives (1992), and the vampire film Nadja (1994). She chose to not pursue acting and enrolled in the New York University creative masters writing program on a full scholarship from The New York Times. She also received a teaching stipend. She began writing her first novel, By the Shore, as a grad-student. Craze showed early chapters of the novel to a book editor Jonathan Burnham and agent Kim Witherspoon. She was told the novel would be difficult to sell.

After moving from New York City to Amherst, Massachusetts, to continue writing, Craze sent the first three chapters of By the Shore to Dolce, who gave the manuscript to publisher Grove Atlantic. Editor Elisabeth Schmitz signed Craze to a two-book deal.

By the Shore, was published in 1999 and was greeted with acclaim. It follows the story of May, a 12-year-old girl with a young, self- absorbed mother who struggles with single parenthood, romance, and running a bed and breakfast.

Craze struggled to write her second novel. She wrote half a manuscript before abandoning it. She completed a 380-page manuscript that she also discarded. By the Shore's sequel, Tiger, Tiger, was published in 2008. The story takes place two years after By the Shore, and involves May's mother moving herself and her children to an ashram near Los Angeles. Craze has said that her first two novels are partially autobiographical. Tiger, Tiger was praised by AfterEllen as an "absolutely beautiful novel about a family that is struggling to stay together." The Los Angeles Times called it "a deceptively slight, simple, haunting story, a meditation on a disintegrating family." However, it received a quieter reception in the US than By the Shore.

Book packager Alloy Entertainment approached Craze to write The Last Princess, which she recalled as being enjoyable due to the collaborative nature with "a strict deadline." The Last Princess was published in 2012. It was described by Kirkus Reviews as "Princess Eliza Windsor fights comic-book evil in a post-apocalyptic United Kingdom," and criticized the narrative's rushed pace and lack of character development. A prequel, entitled Invasion, was published in 2015.

In 2013, Publishers Weekly announced that Soho Teen had bought the North American rights to a YA mystery co-written by Craze and screenwriter Mark Bomback. Publication was originally planned for the spring of 2014. Kim Witherspoon represented Craze in making the deal.

The novel, entitled Mapmaker, was published on April 14, 2015. Kirkus Reviews warned readings that the plot lacked closure, and was likely setting up a sequel.

Craze was interviewed by Ted Perch on the local television program In Studio by Easthampton Media to promote the book. She said Bomback primarily contributed the larger concept and story twists. Craze stated that she would like to write a sequel, but needed permission from the publisher.

== Personal life ==
Craze is an Anglophile. She married novelist and documentary film producer Sam Brumbaugh in 2002. They have two children. Rowan Brumbaugh, the pair's son, plays college basketball for the Tulane Green Wave.

== Filmography ==
Year	Title	Role	Notes
1991	A Kiss Before Dying	Susie	
1992	Husbands and Wives	Harriett	
1994	Nadja	Lucy	
1996	Winterlude	Betsy Dance	Short
1998	Myth America		Direct-to-video
1999	Pigeonholed	Kayleigh	
2010	Long Way Home	Woman	Short

== Bibliography ==
- By the Shore, Atlantic Monthly Press, May 1999. ISBN 978-0-87113-746-3
- Tiger, Tiger, Grove Press, 2008. ISBN 978-0-80217-054-5
- The Last Princess (Last Princess Series), Poppy, May 2012. ISBN 978-0-31618-548-6
- Invasion (Last Princess Series), Poppy, 2015. ISBN 978-0-31618-546-2
- Mapmaker (co-written with Mark Bomback), Soho Teen, 2015. ISBN 9781616953478
