= Knife+Heart =

2018 film by Yann Gonzalez

- Theatrical release poster
- French: Un couteau dans le cœur
- Literally: A Knife in the Heart
- Directed by: Yann Gonzalez
- Written by: Yann Gonzalez; Cristiano Mangione
- Produced by: Charles Gillibert
- Starring: Vanessa Paradis; Nicolas Maury; Kate Moran; Jonathan Genet; Romane Bohringer
- Cinematography: Simon Beaufils
- Edited by: Raphaël Lefèvre
- Music by: M83
- Production companies: CG Cinéma; Piano; Garidi Films; Arte France Cinéma; Radio Télévision Suisse
- Distributed by: Memento Films (France)
- Release dates: 17 May 2018 (Cannes); 27 June 2018 (France); 17 May 2019 (Mexico)
- Running time: 102 minutes
- Countries: France; Mexico; Switzerland
- Language: French
- Budget: €3.4 million
- Box office: $341,847

Knife+Heart (French: Un couteau dans le cœur, lit. 'A Knife in the Heart') is a 2018 horror thriller film directed by Yann Gonzalez, who co-wrote the screenplay with Cristiano Mangione. It was produced by Charles Gillibert and stars Vanessa Paradis, Nicolas Maury, Kate Moran, Jonathan Genet and Romane Bohringer. An international co-production of France, Mexico and Switzerland, the film was selected to compete for the Palme d'Or at the 2018 Cannes Film Festival. The lead character is loosely based on Anne-Marie Tensi, a female producer specialized in gay pornography who was active in France in the 1970s and 1980s.

== Plot ==
A young man dances in a nightclub. He spots a man wearing a leather mask and goes with him to a room to have sex. The masked man then straps him to a bed and kills him with a dildo with a blade concealed within. In the summer of 1979 in Paris, Anne, a producer and director of gay pornography, is abandoned by her girlfriend and editor, Loïs. Anne's best friend and actor Archibald is trying to maintain a good environment for the actors while they shoot Anne's next film. After being contacted and questioned by the police, it is revealed that the young man from the beginning, Karl, had starred in many of Anne's films. Karl's death forces Anne to find another actor; she meets a young miner named Nans, who despite being heterosexual agrees to star in her upcoming film. Anne decides to center the film on Karl's murder, naming it Anal Fury V.

Later, the killer murders Thierry, another of the film's actors, while he injects heroin. The whole studio is now frightened by the murders and the police's failure to protect them. Still confident, Anne hires four more actors to continue filming the film, now retitled Homocidal. The crew manages to finish the film and celebrate with a picnic in a forest. During the picnic, Anne is visited by Loïs to try to reconcile their relationship but are interrupted by a storm. Meanwhile, Misia, another actor, gets lost in the forest and is murdered by the masked killer.

In a manic state, Anne chases after Loïs and sexually assaults her. Loïs runs away, leaving Anne deeply devastated. After three more deaths, Anne tries to convince the police to protect them, but they dismiss her. However, an officer gives her a clue: in each crime scene, a grackle feather was found next to the corpse. Anne contacts a pet shop to learn more about the feather and is told that it belongs to a species of blind grackle. Anne travels to a small town where its forest houses the species.

In the forest, she spots a cemetery where a lonely woman is grieving. The woman tells Anne the story of her son Guy Favre, who had a secret affair with his friend Hicham. After the couple had sex in a barn, Guy's father caught them. He murdered Hicham, castrated Guy, and burned the barn with Guy inside. Guy's mother tells Anne that Guy managed to survive, albeit horribly disfigured. That night, Anne receives newspaper clippings of Guy's murder and realises that he is the killer. Intent on setting a trap for Guy, she tells the crew to film another scene with Archibald as the main actor. Meanwhile, Loïs is editing the latest scene from Homocidal when she spots Guy in the footage.

Back at the shooting, the film does not make any progress, which leads to an improvising that involves mini-blackouts. As these unfold, Guy appears and murders actor Luis and attempts to murder Anne. Loïs arrives and intervenes, which causes her to get stabbed by Guy. She dies in Anne's arms as Guy escapes. Sometime later, Anne and Nans attend the premiere of Homocidal at an adult movie theater. Guy is also there, sitting near Nans. After the film ends, another of Anne's films begins playing; she realises that the murdered actors all starred in a scene which recreated Guy's tragic story, and that he wants revenge by murdering all those involved, including Anne.

In a dark room, Guy attempts but is unable to murder Nans due to his physical resemblance to Hicham. Just as he is about to attack him, he is interrupted by Anne. Guy takes another man hostage and runs to another film screening, where the audience of gay men attack and kill him as payback for the fear he created in the community. In a flashback, Guy and Hicham's tragic love story is recalled with an addition: a blind grackle who revives the disfigured Guy after the fire. He suffered amnesia and went to live in Paris; his rage was later triggered when he watched Anne's film. Anne shoots her latest film and reconciles with Loïs' spirit.

== Cast ==
- Vanessa Paradis as Anne Parèze
- Nicolas Maury as Archibald Langevin
- Kate Moran as Loïs McKenna
- Jonathan Genet as Guy Favre
  - Renan Prévot as young Guy
- Romane Bohringer as Cathy Vannier
- Khaled Alouach as Nans / Fouad
- Félix Maritaud as Thierry
- Noé Hernández as Luis, known professionally as José
- Thibault Servière as Misia
- Bastien Waultier as Jean-Marie Duvernet, known professionally as Karl
- Bertrand Mandico as François Tabou
- Jules Ritmanic as Rabah
- Pierre Pirol as Golden Mouth
- Dourane Fall as Fabio
- Yann Collette as Inspector Morcini
- Jacques Nolot as M. Vannier
- Teymour El Attar as Hicham
- Elina Löwensohn as Mrs. Favre
- Gilles Carré as Mr. Favre
- Christophe Bier as a fan of Anne's

== Production ==
Filming took place in Tours, Joué-lès-Tours and the Île-de-France region.

== Reception ==
On the review aggregator website Rotten Tomatoes, the film holds an approval rating of 80% based on 82 reviews, with an average rating of 6.8/10. The website's critics consensus reads, "Knife + Heart wrings giallo-inspired thrills out of a boldly challenging story that defiantly succeeds on its own stylish merits." Metacritic, which uses a weighted average, assigned the film a score of 70 out of 100, based on 17 critics, indicating "generally favorable" reviews.

Katie Rife of The A.V. Club gave the film a grade of "B", calling it an "unabashedly queer tribute to the sleazier side of giallo cinema" and concluding: "Gonzalez seems to want us to admire the sex and violence rather than be aroused or frightened by them, a distinction that makes this perverse little thriller more of an intellectual pleasure than a prurient one. Still, maybe don't watch it with your mom."
