= Doo Wop (film) =

- Theatrical poster
- Directed by: David Lanzmann
- Written by: David Lanzmann
- Produced by: David Lanzmann; Richard Touil (associate producer)
- Cinematography: Pascal Lagriffoul
- Edited by: David Lanzmann
- Music by: Les Chausettes Sales
- Production companies: Les films de la Gaïole co-production: Les Aventuriers de l'Image; U-Bangui; Caravan Pictures
- Distributed by: Limelight Distribution
- Release date: June 29, 2004
- Running time: 90 minutes
- Countries: France; USA
- Language: French

Doo Wop is a 2004 French romantic drama film directed, produced and written by David Lanzmann. It won the Mannheim-Heidelberg International Filmfestival for Award of Independent Cinema Owners, FIPRESCI Prize, and Special Prize of the Jury. The plot of the film is centered on the figure of a band manage who manages former girlfriend's band but struggles for his debt of the loan sharks.

== Cast ==
- Michaël Fitoussi as Ziggy
- Caroline Ducey as Marie
- Elina Löwensohn as Maya
- Clovis Cornillac as Thierry
- Philippe Nahon as Michel
- Grégory Fitoussi as The seller
