= Vincent Must Die =

2023 film by Stéphan Castang

- Theatrical release poster
- French: Vincent doit mourir
- Directed by: Stéphan Castang
- Written by: Mathieu Naert; Stéphan Castang; Dominique Baumard
- Produced by: Claire Bonnefoy; Thierry Lounas
- Starring: Karim Leklou; Vimala Pons
- Cinematography: Manuel Dacosse
- Edited by: Méloé Poillevé
- Music by: John Kaced
- Production companies: Capricci Films; Bobi Lux; GapBusters; Arte France Cinéma; Auvergne-Rhône-Alpes Cinéma; RTBF; VOO; BE TV; Proximus
- Distributed by: Capricci Films
- Release dates: 19 May 2023 (Cannes); 15 November 2023 (France)
- Running time: 108 minutes
- Countries: France; Belgium
- Language: French
- Box office: $166,665

Vincent Must Die (French: Vincent doit mourir) is a 2023 satirical horror thriller film directed by Stéphan Castang in his feature-length directorial debut, and written by Mathieu Naert, Castang and Dominique Baumard. It stars Karim Leklou and Vimala Pons.

== Plot ==
Vincent is a graphic designer in Lyon who finds that everyone, starting with his coworkers but soon expanding out into the wider community, suddenly wants to kill him for no obvious reason. He eventually meets Margaux, a waitress who seems to be the only person not out to kill Vincent. Later when he tries to drive away with her, he hears of a plague on the radio, and sees a pile of cars with people who have gotten out and try to kill each other.

== Cast ==
- Karim Leklou as Vincent Borel
- Vimala Pons as Margaux Lamy
- François Chattot as Jean-Pierre Borel, Vincent's father
- Jean-Rémi Chaize as Alex
- Ulysse Genevrey as Hugo Monnier
- Karoline Rose Sun as Audrey
- Emmanuel Vérité as Yves
- Sébastien Chabane as Lionel
- Benoît Lambert as policeman
- Léna Dia as La jeune fille du bar
- Pierre Maillet as the psychiatrist
- Michaël Perez as Joachim DB
- Anne-Gaëlle Jourdain as Marie
- Guillaume Bursztyn as Le facteur
- Maurin Olles as Raph
- Jean-Christophe Folly as Lucas
- Suzy as Sultan

== Release ==
The film premiered in the Critics' Week program at the 2023 Cannes Film Festival. It was also invited at the 28th Busan International Film Festival in 'World Cinema' section and was screened on 7 October 2023.

It was theatrically released in France on 15 November 2023 by Capricci Films.

An English dub made using artificial intelligence was released in the United States on 31 October 2025 by XYZ Films as part of a double feature release, paired with Hallow Road.

== Reception ==
=== Critical response ===
On the review aggregator website Rotten Tomatoes, 93% of 30 critics' reviews are positive. The website's consensus reads: "Vincent Must Die's slow turn from absurd comedy to tense, horror-tinged drama is supported by smart storytelling and compelling work from Karim Leklou in the lead role."

Damon Wise of Deadline Hollywood reviewed the film positively, writing that "for all its deadpan humor — an altercation by an open sewer goes exactly the way you think/hope it might — Vincent Must Die is a really rather thoughtful film about the minefield of microaggressions that await us all. You can read the set-up as a metaphor for office politics, and the rest of it as allegory for the internecine nature of social media, where the mildest of opinions can ruin lives and reputations. Most of all, though, it is a joyfully absurdist tale of everyday alienation writ large. If Samuel Beckett had scripted Shaun of the Dead, it might have looked something like this."

Fabien Lemercier of Cineuropa wrote that "careering along at top speed and punctuated by fights which are all the more hellish for the fact the individuals involved don't have a liking for fights and they break out in the most unseemly of places (notably a septic tank), Vincent Must Die injects much needed dark humour (flirting with slapstick) into a razor-sharp, pre-apocalyptic societal portrait (based on an incredibly rich script whose underlayers come courtesy of Mathieu Naert). Carried by the formidable talent of its lead actor, and wonderfully enveloped by Manu Dacosse's photography and John Kaced's music, the film sucks the viewer into its many twists and turns, releasing enough in its uncompromising wake to make us reflect upon the state of the modern world. It's a highly promising prototype from an exciting new generation of French filmmakers who cite Carpenter and Romero among their sources of inspiration."

Christian Zilko of IndieWire was more dismissive, grading the film B− and opining that "Castang and screenwriter Mathieu Naert seem to tease us with the multitude of exciting paths that the film could go down before ultimately choosing the least interesting one. Instead of continuing with the dark comedy or fleshing out the mythology of The Sentinel, they take the darkest route and leave us with something that begins to resemble a generic zombie movie by the end. The natural response to the first few dozen attempts on Vincent's life is righteous indignation at the poor man's mistreatment. But after an hour and a half, it's fair to wonder if the possessed mob is onto something."

=== Accolades ===
At the 2023 Fantasia Film Festival, the film received a special mention from the Cheval Noir award jury.

Award	Date of ceremony	Category	Recipient(s)	Result	Ref.
Cannes Film Festival	27 May 2023	Caméra d'Or	Stéphan Castang	Nominated	
César Awards	23 February 2024	Best First Film	Vincent Must Die	Nominated	
Louis Delluc Prize	6 December 2023	Best First Film	Vincent Must Die	Nominated	
Lumière Awards	22 January 2024	Best Actor	Karim Leklou	Nominated	
Lumière Awards	22 January 2024	Best First Film	Vincent Must Die	Nominated	
Magritte Awards	9 March 2024	Best Foreign Film in Coproduction	Vincent Must Die	Won	
Magritte Awards	9 March 2024	Best Sound	Dirk Bombey, Emilie Mauguet, Xavier Thieulin and Bertrand Boudaud	Nominated	

== Remake ==
In September 2026, it was announced that AR Content, Vertigo Entertainment, Blumhouse–Atomic Monster, and Goodfellas are developing a remake with David Leslie Johnson-McGoldrick writing and directing the film.
