= Vimala Pons =

French actress (born 1983)

- Pons in 2024
- Born: 15 March 1986 (age 40); Thiruvananthapuram, Kerala, India
- Education: Conservatoire national supérieur d'art dramatique (CNSAD)
- Occupation: Actress
- Years active: 2006–present

Vimala Pons (born 15 March 1986) is a French actress and juggler of part Indian descent. Her notable films include The Rendez-Vous of Déjà-Vu (2013), La Loi de la jungle (2016), Elle (2016) and The Wild Boys (2017).

== Filmography ==
=== Feature films ===
Year	Film	Role	Notes
2006	Locked Out		
2006	President	Brown Mistress	
2007	Eden Log	The botanist	
2009	Around a Small Mountain	Barbara	
2009	Bazar	Marina	
2009	Bitter Victory	Anaïs Cluzel	
2011	Mangrove	Wife	
2012	Granny's Funeral	Berthe Jeune	
2012	You Ain't Seen Nothin' Yet	Eurydice	
2013	The Rendez-Vous of Déjà-Vu	Truquette	
2014	Métamorphoses	Atalante	
2014	Fidelio: Alice's Odyssey	Sarah	
2014	40-Love	Sylvie	
2014	Vincent	Lucie	
2015	The Sweet Escape	Mila	
2015	I'm All Yours	Hanna Belkacem	
2015	The Very Private Life of Mister Sim	Poppy	
2015	In the Shadow of Women	Lisa	
2016	Marie and the Misfits	Marie Andrieu	
2016	Elle	Hélène	
2016	Struggle for Life	Tarzan	
2017	The Wild Boys	Jean-Louis	
2018	Bécassine	Marie Quillouch	
2020	How I Became a Superhero (Comment je suis devenu super-héros)	Schaltzmann	
2023	Vincent Must Die (Vincent doit mourir)	Margaux Lamy	
2024	The Ties That Bind Us	Emillia Demetriu	

=== Short films ===
Year	Film	Role	Notes
2003	Le Blanc des yeux		
2010	J'aurais pu être une pute	Mina	
2014	L'Homme qui avait perdu la tête	The psychologist	

=== Television ===
Year	Show	Role	Notes
2006	Gaspard le bandit	Magali	Movie
2008	Nicolas Le Floch	The Duchess Marie of Langremont	Series
