= En malas compañías =

- Directed by: Antonio Hens
- Starring: Israel Rodríguez
- Release date: 2000
- Running time: 17 minutes
- Country: Spain
- Language: Spanish

En malas compañías (translation: In Bad Company or With a Bad Crowd), titled in English as Doors Cut Down, is a 2000 Spanish short comedy film directed by Antonio Hens.

== Plot ==
Sixteen-year-old Guillermo (Israel Rodríguez) does not exactly hide his sexual orientation, even though his parents disapprove of it. He also seduces his English language tutor who introduces him to the pleasures of anal sex, and moves on to frequently cruise the toilets of the local mall for gay sex, getting caught once by mall security guards. As a consequence of that incident, his parents learn of his activities, and take him to a mental health therapist, who pronounces Guillermo to be mentally healthy and in no need of conversion therapy but recommends further sessions for his parents to help them accept their son's sexual identity.

This short film was shown on British television network Channel 4. It is included in the gay and lesbian short film collection Boys Briefs 2.

== Awards ==
The movie won two Caja de Madrid awards at the short film festival ALCINE (Festival de Cine de Alcalá de Henares) in Alcalá de Henares in 2000, one for Best Male Actor (Israel Rodríguez) and another for Social Values. At the festival Madridimagen it won the prize for the best short in the same year.

== Restoration ==
The movie was restored in 2K High Definition in 2015 from the original camera negative. The release in the United States is being handled by Altered Innocence.
