= David Greilsammer =

Pianist and Conductor (born 1977)

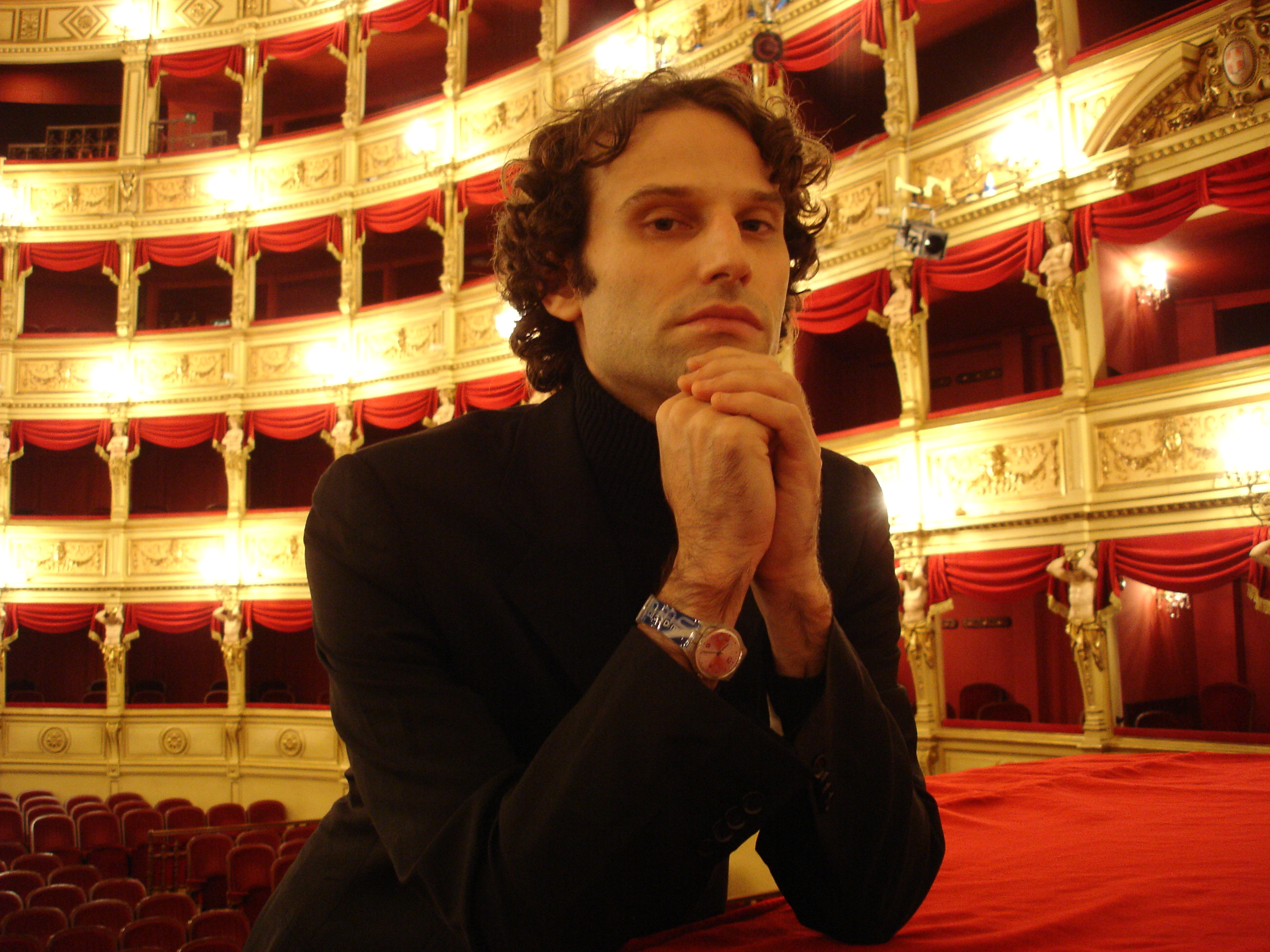

David Greilsammer (10 August 1977) is a pianist and conductor.

== Biography ==
David Greilsammer is the eldest of five brothers, and lives nowadays between Paris, Geneva and Medellín. His brother Michael Greilsammer is a professional violinist. David Greilsammer studied at the Juilliard School in New York City, as a student of pianist Yoheved Kaplinsky. At Juilliard, he received a Bachelor and Master’s degree, and later on he studied with American pianist Richard Goode, in New York.

In 2004, David Greilsammer made his debut at Lincoln Center in New York, in a performance that was praised by The New York Times. He then signed his first recording contract with Vanguard Records, releasing his first album, dedicated to Mozart's Early Piano Concertos, which he played and conducted. It is at that period of his life that he started appearing also as a conductor, in addition to his engagements as pianist. Shortly after his first album was released, David Greilsammer started performing in a variety of concert halls and festivals internationally as pianist and conductor, like the Wigmore Hall in London, Suntory Hall in Tokyo, Théâtre du Châtelet in Paris, and the Forbidden City Theatre in Beijing.

In 2006 David Greilsammer founded the Suedama Ensemble in New York. He recorded with this orchestra several albums, all dedicated to Mozart - a composer that he has been passionate about all his life. He was also appointed to the role of Music Director of the Geneva Chamber Orchestra in 2009.

Since 2013, David Greilsammer has served as Music and Artistic Director of the Geneva Camerata, an orchestra that presents eclectic multidisciplinary projects, in Switzerland and around the world. Swiss journalist Jean-Philippe Rapp is the President of the orchestra’s board. With the Geneva Camerata, David Greilsammer has performed at the Berlin Philharmonie, Hamburg Elbphilharmonie, 92nd Street Y in New York, Théâtre des Champs-Elysées in Paris, Musashino Hall in Tokyo, Sala São Paulo, Teatro Solis in Montevideo and the Seoul Arts Center.

Since 2022, David Greilsammer also serves as Chief Conductor and Music Director of the Medellín Philharmonic Orchestra in Colombia.

As a conductor and pianist, David Greilsammer has appeared with the BBC Philharmonic Orchestra, the San Francisco Symphony, Orchestre Philharmonique de Radio France, Hamburg Symphony Orchestra, the Tokyo Metropolitan Symphony Orchestra, the Mozarteum Orchestra Salzburg, the Mexico National Symphony Orchestra, the Hong Kong Philharmonic Orchestra, La Verdi Orchestra in Milano, the Beijing National Symphony Orchestra, and the Jerusalem Symphony Orchestra.

David Greilsammer's recitals - always featuring innovative and ground-breaking programmes - have been presented at the Amsterdam Concertgebouw, Salle Pleyel in Paris, Mostly Mozart Festival in New York, Ravinia Festival in Chicago, Kennedy Center in Washington D.C, Hong Kong City Hall Concert Hall in Hong Kong, Shanghai Oriental Art Center, CENART in Mexico City, the Verdi Auditorium in Milano, the Picasso Museum in Malaga, Centro Cultural de Belém in Lisbon, and the Israeli Opera House.

== Artistic vision and projects ==
David Greilsammer has always been passionate about innovation and creating new, eclectic, and audacious musical projects. Throughout his life, his goal has been to bring classical music to a wider and younger public, making it more accessible and open. He has made several recordings dedicated to Mozart. In 2008, he performed, in one single day in Paris, all of Mozart’s Piano Sonatas, without any intermission, from 10am to 10pm. The same year, he also performed this Mozart “marathon" at the Verbier Festival in Switzerland and on tour in various other venues. David Greilsammer has created numerous projects that bring to life unexpected links between Baroque music and Contemporary music. His "Scarlatti:Cage:Sonatas” recital is an example of such a project, creating an encounter between past and present. He has also collaborated with many jazz, rock and world music artists. Following his mission to open classical music to new audiences, he has also created a variety of projects bringing together classical music with dance, theatre and visual arts.

In 2011, he signed an exclusive contract with Sony Classical, recording four award-winning albums for this label. In 2020, he signed an exclusive contract with naïve, releasing a new solo album named “Labyrinth”. This album has been praised by The New York Times among other newspapers, magazines, and radio stations.

== Discography ==
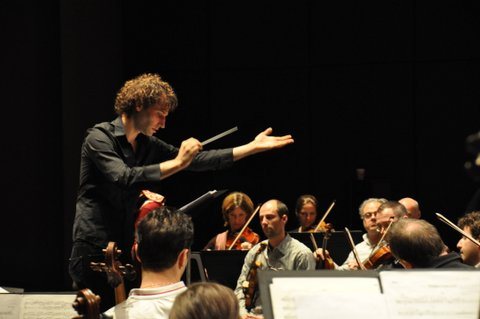
David Greilsammer conducting the Geneva Chamber Orchestra

- Mozart, Early Piano Concertos - with Suedama Ensemble, David Greilsammer, piano and conductor (2006, Vanguard Records).
- fantaisie_fantasme - piano solo (2007, naïve)
- Mozart, Concertos No. 22 and 24 - with Suedama Ensemble, David Greilsammer piano and conductor (2009, naïve).
- Gershwin/Tansman/Boulanger - live concert at Salle Pleyel in Paris, with the Orchestre Philharmonique de Radio France (2010, naïve).
- Baroque Conversations - piano solo (2011, Sony Classical)
- Mozart In-Between (2012, Sony Classical)
- Scarlatti:Cage:Sonatas - piano and prepared piano (2014, Sony Classical)
- Sounds of Transformation, with the Geneva Camerata and jazz pianist Yaron Herman (2018, Sony Classical)
- Labyrinth - piano solo (2020, naïve)

== Awards and distinctions ==
- French Classical Awards "Victoires de la Musique Classique": Revelation of the Year - Instrumental Soloist, 2008
- Mozart: Concertos de jeunesse, disque de l'année selon le Daily Telegraph, 2007
- fantaisie_fantasme, « Choc », Le Monde de la musique
- fantaisie_fantasme, Album of the year, Sunday Times, 2008
- fantaisie_fantasme, Maestro Prize, Pianiste Magazine, 2008
- Baroque Conversations, Selection "Best Classical Music Recordings of 2012", New York Times
- Mozart In-Between, Selection "Times Critics Favorite Classical Recordings of 2013", New York Times
- Scarlatti:Cage:Sonatas, "Un des dix plus importants événements musicaux de l'année", New York Times, 2014
- Scarlatti:Cage:Sonatas, Selection "NPR Music's 25 Favorite Albums Of 2014 (So Far)", NPR
- Sounds of Transformation, Selection "Best Classical Releases of January 2018", WQXR
- Best performance of the year, Geneva Camerata's "Dance of the Sun", New York Times, 2019
- Labyrinth, Selection "The Best Music Of 2020: NPR Staff Picks", NPR
- Labyrinth, Selection "Top 10 classical music albums of 2020", The Boston Globe, 2020
- Labyrinth, Selection "10 best classical albums of 2020", Haaretz, 2020
- Labyrinth, Selection "The 25 Best Classical Music Tracks of 2020", The New York Times, 2020
