= Bertrand Mandico =

French film director (born 1971)

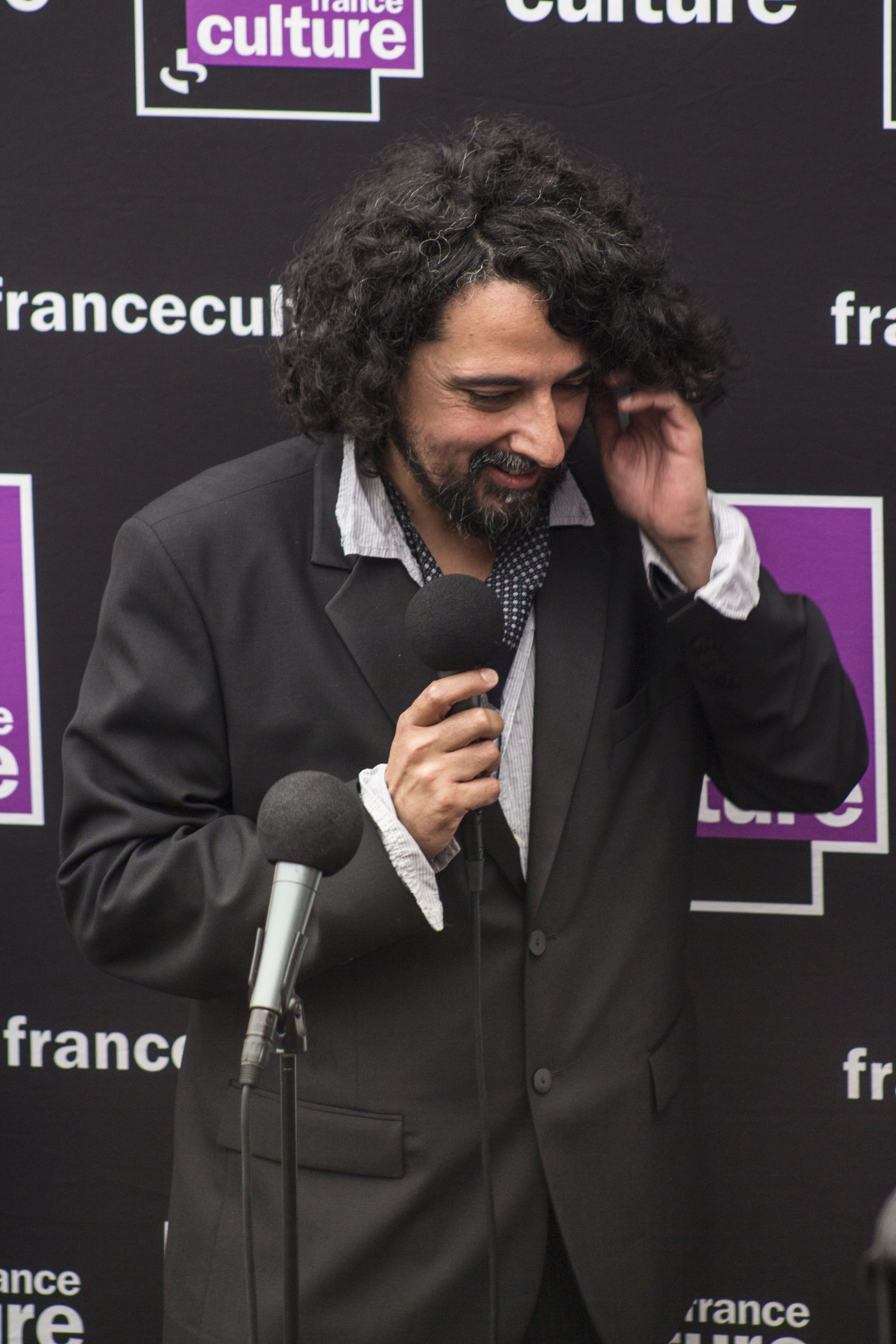
- Mandico at Cannes 2018
- Born: 21 March 1971 (age 55); Toulouse, France
- Occupations: Film director; screenwriter
- Years active: 1997–present
- Partner: Elina Löwensohn (c. 2010–present)

Bertrand Mandico (born 21 March 1971) is a French film director and screenwriter. His first feature film, The Wild Boys (2017), was named the best film of 2018 by Cahiers du Cinéma. He has also written and directed After Blue (2021), She Is Conann (2023), Dragon Dilatation (2024), and Roma Elastica (2026). His films are often interested in the body and gender fluidity and incorporate photos and written elements.

== Early life ==
Mandico was born on 21 March 1971 in Toulouse, France. He graduated from the film directing program at the Gobelins school in Paris in 1993.

== Career ==
Mandico has directed short films, medium-length films, experimental essays, and feature films. Mandico has an unusual working method. He prefers to create the audio for his films in post-production. Actors post-synchronize themselves, and the environmental sounds and music are layered on. However, he always shoots his images on color film, with no post-production images. Background projection and superimposition are done during the shoot.

Mandico's first animated short film, The Blue Cavalier, won the Annecy Prize Grant in 1998.

Mandico created the Incoherence Manifesto in 2012 with Icelandic filmmaker Katrín Ólafsdóttir. He states that:

To be incoherent means to have faith in cinema, it means to have a romantic approach, unformatted, free, disturbed and dreamlike, cinegenic, an epic narration.

A group of young filmmakers including Yann Gonzalez, Caroline Poggi and Jonathan Vinel have been influenced by the manifesto.

In 2010, Mandico commenced 20+1 Projections, a collaborative project with Romanian-American actress Elina Löwensohn, where they are to make 21 short films in 21 years. Though each film is meant to be a unique narrative and formal work, they are to revolve around the themes of aging and desire. Their first collaboration was in Boro in a Box (2011).

Mandico explores non-binary identities and gender fluidity in his films, often casting women to play male characters. He was named best director at the Vilnius International Film Festival in 2018 for The Wild Boys (2017), in which all five male protagonists were played by women. It was also named the best film of 2018 by French film magazine Cahiers du Cinéma.

In 2021, he wrote and directed the science fiction film After Blue. In 2023, he wrote and directed the action fantasy She Is Conann, a feminist take on Conan the Barbarian. In 2024, he wrote and directed the experimental film Dragon Dilatation, combining two film essays: an adaptation of Igor Stravinsky's ballet Petrouchka, and footage from a cancelled stage production rehearsed at the Théâtre Nanterre-Amandiers titled The Deviant Comedy.

His upcoming fifth feature film, Roma Elastica, starring Marion Cotillard, premiered at the Midnight Screenings section of the 2026 Cannes Film Festival.

== Personal life ==
Mandico identifies as non-binary, pansexual, agender and xenogender. Mandico uses both male and female pronouns.

Since the 2010s, Mandico has been in a relationship with Romanian-American actress and frequent collaborator Elina Löwensohn, with whom he lives in Paris. Mandico and Löwensohn have collaborated on Mandico's 20+1 Projections, a project of 21 short films in 21 years directed by Mandico and starring Löwensohn which documents the aging process of an actress and began with Boro In The Box (2011). Mandico has described Löwensohn as his favorite actress, his artistic double and the actress he dreamed of being.

== Filmography ==
Mandico has directed feature films, short films, TV-commercials and musical films.

=== Feature films ===
Year	English title	French title
2017	The Wild Boys	Les Garçons sauvages
2021	After Blue or After Blue (Dirty Paradise)	After Blue (Paradis sale)
2023	She Is Conann	Conann
2024	Dragon Dilatation	
2026	Roma Elastica	

=== Short films ===
Year	English title	French title	Notes
1997	La Chanson du Jardinier Fou		
1999	The Blue Cavalier	Le cavalier bleu	
2000	Monsieur Flupersu		
2002	Osmose		
2002	Chris Dangoisse: De droite		
2002	Chris Dangoisse: Ils dansent		
2003	C’était le chien d’Eddy		
2004	All You Have Seen Is True	Tout ce que vous avez vu est vrai	
2006	He Says He's Dead	Il dit qu'il est mort...	
2007	Mie l’enfant descend du songe		
2007	Essai 135		
2009	His Majesty Little Beard	Sa majesté petite barbe	
2010	The Life and Death of Henry Darger	Lif og daudi Henry Darger	
2010	Burlesque and Cold	Burlesque et froid	
2011	Boro in the Box		
2012	Living Still Life	La résurrection des natures mortes (Living Still Life)	
2013	Féminisme, rafale et politique		
2013	Prehistoric Cabaret		
2014	S... Sa... Salam... Salammbô...		
2014	Memories of a Boobs Flasher	Souvenirs d'un montreur de seins	
2015	Our Lady of Hormones	Notre-Dame des Hormones	
2015	Any Virgin Left Alive?	Y a-t-il une vierge encore vivante?	
2015	Depressive Cop		
2017	Odile of the Valley	Odile dans la vallée	
2018	L’île aux robes		
2018	Apocalypse After	Ultra pulpe	Part of Ultra Rêve, a collection of three short films by Mandico, Caroline Poggi and Jonathan Vinel, and Yann Gonzalez.
2018	À rebours		
2019	Niemand		
2019	ExtaZus		
2020	The Return of Tragedy		
2021	HUYSwoMANS		
2022	The Last Cartoon		Part of L’émission a déjà commencé.
2022	J’ai tué Kate Bush		Unused footage from the feature film After Blue.
2023	Rainer, A Vicious Dog in a Skull Valley		Part of L’émission a déjà commencé.
2023	We Barbarians	Nous les barbares	Part of L’émission a déjà commencé.
