= Geneva Camerata =

Orchestra

- Orchestra
- Short name: GECA
- Founded: 2013
- Location: Geneva, Switzerland
- Music director: David Greilsammer
- Website: genevacamerata.com/en

The Geneva Camerata (GECA), is an orchestra composed of forty international musicians of the young generation. Based in Geneva, it performs music of all periods and styles, from early baroque music to contemporary music, as well as jazz, rock, world music, electronic music, in addition to creating a variety of multidisciplinary projects involving dance, theatre, and visual arts.

The music and artistic director of the Geneva Camerata is conductor and pianist David Greilsammer. The orchestra was founded in 2013 by Céline Meyer and David Greilsammer, and since then the group has performed at festivals and venues such as the Berliner Philharmonie, Théâtre du Châtelet in Paris, Kings Place in London, Montreux Jazz Festival, Centro Nacional de las Artes in Mexico City, Istanbul International Music Festival, Rheingau Musik Festival, NCPA in Beijing and Oriental Art Center in Shanghai.

== History ==
The Geneva Camerata was founded in 2013 by Céline Meyer and David Greilsammer. The journalist and film maker Jean-Philippe Rapp is the president of the orchestra's board. Since its first season, the Geneva Camerata's mission has been to open the classical music world to wider and younger audiences and to create unusual projects that bring together different styles, genres, and forms of art. Today, the orchestra gives forty concerts per season, ranging from baroque music performances on period instruments and classical concerts with international soloists, to collaborations with jazz and world music artists, and to special projects with dancers and actors.

== Guest artists ==
Since it was founded in 2013, the Geneva Camerata has collaborated with the flutist Emmanuel Pahud, the violinists Viktoria Mullova, Patricia Kopatchinskaja, Daniel Hope, Christian Tetzlaff, and Nemanja Radulovic, the cellists Steven Isserlis, Jean-Guihen Queyras, Gautier Capuçon and Johannes Moser, the mandolin player Avi Avital, the clarinettist Gilad Harel, and with the singers Anne Sofie von Otter, Sandrine Piau, Véronique Gens, and Marie-Nicole Lemieux. The orchestra has also collaborated with the jazz artists Richard Galliano, Didier Lockwood, Tigran Hamasyan, Yaron Herman, Jacky Terrasson, and Stefano Bollani. In the field of contemporary dance, the Geneva Camerata has collaborated with the choreographers Juan Kruz Diaz de Garaio Esnaola, Nicolas Cantillon, Laurence Yadi, Cindy van Acker, and Kirsten Debrock.

== Concert series ==
In Geneva, the orchestra presents every season three main concert series. The first, called Prestige Concerts is the ensemble's subscription series, in which the orchestra features international soloists from the worlds of baroque, classical, contemporary, and jazz music. The second, called Crazy Concerts is the orchestra's most experimental series, in which the group presents shows that bring together classical music, pop, rock, techno, musicals, free jazz, and folk music. The third series, called Family Concerts, is the orchestra's educational series, presenting to young audiences shows that feature opera singers, actors, magicians, shadow theatre artists, and circus artists. In addition to these three series, the orchestra goes regularly to hospitals, clinics, and shelters, in order to share music with those who are in need or in suffering.

== Multidisciplinary projects ==
The orchestra's multidisciplinary projects have included an original show for a dancing orchestra based on Jean-Baptiste Lully's opera Le Bourgeois gentilhomme, with a choreography by the Spanish choreographer and dancer Juan Kruz Diaz de Garaio Esnaola. The orchestra has presented several projects with the DJ Francesco Tristano, mixing music by Johann Sebastian Bach and techno music. For the Antigel Festival, the orchestra created a video art project, bringing together the music of the American composer John Adams with a video art creation by Jeff Gaudinet and Hendrik van Boetzelaer. The orchestra has also worked with the circus company Les Objets Volants, with the Romanian puppeteer Liviu Berehoi, the Swiss actress and puppeteer Laure-Isabelle Blanchet, and with the French magician and shadow theatre artist Philippe Beau, creating mini-operas and original shows for children and adolescents.

== World premieres ==
The Geneva Camerata regularly commissions young composers and gives world premiers of their works. Since 2013, the orchestra has given world premieres of new symphonic works by Martin Jaggi, Núria Giménez-Comas, Jannik Giger, Ofer Pelz, Jonathan Keren, Massimo Pinca, Cécile Marti, Marcos Balter, Nicolas von Ritter-Zahony, Francesco Tristano, Sergei Abir, and Michael Pelzel.

== Discography ==
The orchestra's first album, released by Sony Classical, will present an encounter between the worlds of baroque, classical, jazz, and improvisation, with jazz pianist Yaron Herman and jazz drummer Ziv Ravitz. The programme of this album, which received its live world premiere at the Berliner Philharmonie on 8 September 2016, also features Ravel's Piano Concerto in G major, played and conducted by David Greilsammer.
