= Another Girl Another Planet (film) =

1992 American film

- Directed by: Michael Almereyda
- Written by: Michael Almereyda
- Produced by: Bob Gosse
- Starring: Barry Del Sherman; Isabel Gillies; Bob Gosse
- Cinematography: Jim Denault
- Release date: 1992
- Running time: 56 minutes
- Country: United States
- Language: English

Another Girl Another Planet is a 1992 film written and directed by Michael Almereyda. The film is notable for being shot on a Fisher-Price PXL 2000 children's camera.

== Premise ==
Bill struggles to find a lasting relationship and meaningful connection through a succession of women, who have all been touched in some form by the death of someone in their lives.

== Cast ==
- Barry Del Sherman as Bill (credited as Barry Sherman)
- Isabel Gillies as Finley
- Bob Gosse as Man in Bar
- Elina Löwensohn as Mia
- Paula Malcomson as Bartender
- Lisa Perisot as Prudence
- Nic Ratner as Nic
- Tom Roma as Man in Bar
- Maggie Rush as Trish
- Mary B. Ward as Ramona

== Critical reception ==
Vincent Canby of The New York Times wrote "Michael Almereyda's 56-minute 'Another Girl, Another Planet' is something else entirely. It's as American as the East Village walk-up in which it was made, and as comically angst-ridden and gray as its images. 'Another Girl, Another Planet' was initially shot on a Fisher-Price Pixel toy video camera, then transferred to 16-millimeter film."

The National Society of Film Critics gave the film a special citation in its 1992 awards for "expanding the possibilities of experimental filmmaking, including the use of a Pixelvision toy camcorder."
