= The Wild Boys (film) =

2017 French film by Bertrand Mandico

- Directed by: Bertrand Mandico
- Screenplay by: Bertrand Mandico
- Produced by: Emmanuel Chaumet; Mathilde Delaunay
- Starring: Vimala Pons; Diane Rouxel; Anaël Snoek; Mathilde Warnier; Pauline Lorillard; Sam Louwyck; Elina Löwensohn
- Cinematography: Pascale Granel
- Edited by: Laure Saint-Marc
- Music by: Pierre Desprats
- Production company: Ecce Films
- Distributed by: UFO Distribution
- Release dates: 4 September 2017 (Venice); 28 February 2018 (France)
- Running time: 110 minutes
- Country: France
- Languages: French; English

The Wild Boys (French: Les garçons sauvages) is a 2017 French fantasy drama-surrealist film written and directed by Bertrand Mandico in his feature directorial debut. It stars Vimala Pons, Diane Rouxel, Anaël Snoek, Mathilde Warnier, Pauline Lorillard, Sam Louwyck and Elina Löwensohn. Notably, all the five male protagonists in the film were played by female actors.

The film premiered at the 2017 Venice Film Festival under the International Critics' Week, where it won the Mario Serandrei – Hotel Saturnia Award for the Best Technical Contribution. It was released theatrically in France by UFO Distribution on 28 February 2018, and named the best film of 2018 by Cahiers du Cinéma.

== Synopsis ==
Set in the beginning of the 20th century on the island of La Réunion, it is about five French adolescent boys from wealthy families who commit a brutal crime and are in turn taken in by a Dutch Captain for rehabilitation on his dilapidated sailboat, who sail for a tropical island on which they will secretly be changed into women.

== Cast ==
- Vimala Pons as Jean-Louis
- Anaël Snoek as Tanguy
- Diane Rouxel as Hubert
- Mathilde Warnier as Sloane
- Pauline Lorillard as Romuald
- Sam Louwyck as Le Capitaine
- Elina Löwensohn as Séverin(e)

== Production ==
The Wild Boys was written and directed by Bertrand Mandico in his feature directorial debut. It was produced by Ecce Films, with Emmanuel Chaumet and Mathilde Delaunay serving as producers, Pascale Granel as director of photography, Laure Saint-Marc as editor, and with a score composed by Pierre Desprats.

== Release ==
The film premiered at the 74th Venice International Film Festival under the International Critics' Week, where it won the Mario Serandrei – Hotel Saturnia Award for the Best Technical Contribution. UFO Distribution released the film theatrically in France on 28 February 2018.

The streaming service Mubi released the film in the United States on 14 September 2018.

== Reception ==
The Wild Boys received mostly positive reviews from critics. On Rotten Tomatoes, the film holds an approval rating of 90% based on 21 reviews; the site's critics consensus states: "Debuting writer-director Bertrand Mandico's The Wild Boys impresses with the breadth of its ambitions -- and the skill with which they're often triumphantly realized." On Metacritic it has a weighted average score of 64 out of 100, based on 5 critics, indicating "generally favorable reviews". AlloCiné, a French cinema site, gave the film an average rating of 3.6/5, based on a survey of 27 French reviews.

Cath Clarke of The Guardian called the film an "uninhibited, deeply bizarre sex-swap drama". She wrote: "Some might find the movie outrageously self-indulgent, but I was drawn into its hermetically sealed world of oddness – and Mandico pays attention to character to a degree that experimental film-makers often don’t bother with. [...] Mandico has made a wildly strange debut, striking enough to make you sit up and pay attention." Andrew Todd of Birth.Movies.Death noted that "there's also a robust streak of eroticism running through the whole film." He wrote: "It’s the kind of eroticism that would probably make you feel dirty if you really interrogated what you were watching, but it’s achieved with such wide-eyed innocence and tactile texture that you never even think about doing so."

== Accolades ==
French film magazine Cahiers du Cinéma named The Wild Boys the best film of 2018.
