= Yann Gonzalez =

French film director (born 1977)

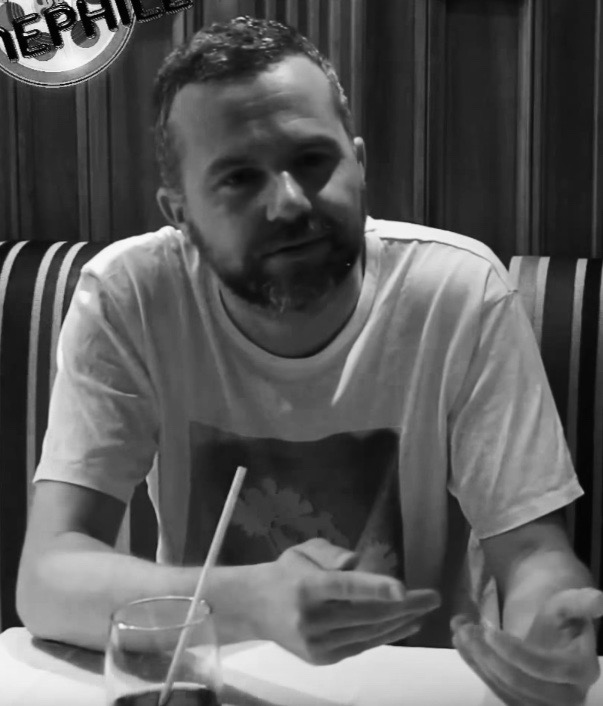
- Gonzalez in 2018
- Born: 1977 (age 48–49); Nice, Alpes-Maritimes, France
- Occupations: Film director; screenwriter
- Years active: 2000s–present

Yann Gonzalez (born 1977, Nice, France) is a French film director, most noted as a recipient of the Prix Jean Vigo in 2018 for his film Knife+Heart.

== Early life ==
The older brother of musician Anthony Gonzalez of M83, he grew up in Antibes, Alpes-Maritimes. He and his brother have frequently collaborated, with Anthony writing and performing the scores to Yann's films and Yann directing several of M83's music videos and contributing to the writing of some songs.

== Career ==
He wrote and directed numerous short films before releasing his debut feature film, You and the Night (Les Rencontres d'après minuit), in 2013. The film premiered at the 2013 Cannes Film Festival, where it was a nominee for the Queer Palm for best LGBTQ-themed feature film.

His 2017 short film Islands (Les Îles) won the Queer Palm for short films at the 2017 Cannes Film Festival.

Knife+Heart, his second feature film, premiered at the 2018 Cannes Film Festival, where it was again a nominee for the Queer Palm.

Gonzalez directed the short film Hideous for Oliver Sim's debut album Hideous Bastard. The short premiered at the 2022 Cannes Film Festival on 22 May, and was later released exclusively on Mubi on 8 September.

== Filmography ==
=== Feature films ===
Year	English Title	Original Title	Notes
2013	You and the Night	Les Rencontres d'après minuit	
2018	Knife+Heart	Un couteau dans le cœur	
2026	I’ll Forget Your Name	J'oublierai ton nom	Post-production
