= She Is Conann =

2023 action fantasy film

- Directed by: Bertrand Mandico
- Written by: Bertrand Mandico
- Produced by: Gilles Chanial; Emmanuel Chaumet; Avi Amar; Antoine Garnier; Olivier Dubois
- Starring: Elina Löwensohn; Christa Théret; Julia Riedler; Claire Duburcq; Sandra Parfait; Agata Buzek; Nathalie Richard; Françoise Brion
- Cinematography: Nicolas Eveilleau
- Edited by: Laure Saint-Marc
- Music by: Pierre Desprats
- Production companies: Les Films Fauves; Ecce Films; Floréal Films; Novak Prod; Orphée Films; Nanterre-Amandiers
- Distributed by: UFO Distribution (France); Altered Innocence (North America)
- Release dates: 19 May 2023 (Cannes); 29 November 2023 (France); 2 February 2024 (United States)
- Running time: 105 minutes
- Countries: France; Belgium; Luxembourg
- Languages: French; English; German

She Is Conann is a 2023 action fantasy film written and directed by Bertrand Mandico. A reworking of Conan the Barbarian, the film follows six incarnations of Conann across different eras, each eventually killed by her future self.

== Release ==
The film had its world premiere in the Directors' Fortnight program at the 2023 Cannes Film Festival on 19 May 2023, where it was in competition for the Queer Palm. It subsequently screened out of competition at the Locarno Film Festival and was selected for Fantastic Fest and the Official Fantàstic Competition of the Sitges Film Festival.

UFO Distribution released the film theatrically in France on 29 November 2023. Altered Innocence began a limited theatrical release in the United States on 2 February 2024.

== Reception ==
On the review aggregator website Rotten Tomatoes, 85% of 33 critics' reviews are positive. Metacritic, which uses a weighted average, assigned the film a score of 74 out of 100 based on seven critics, indicating "generally favorable" reviews.

Katie Rife of RogerEbert.com called the film Mandico's best work to date and praised its "clear, propulsive story arc". William Repass of Slant Magazine described it as "gleefully hostile to realism" and likened it to a French Symbolist poem.
