= Théâtre Nanterre-Amandiers =

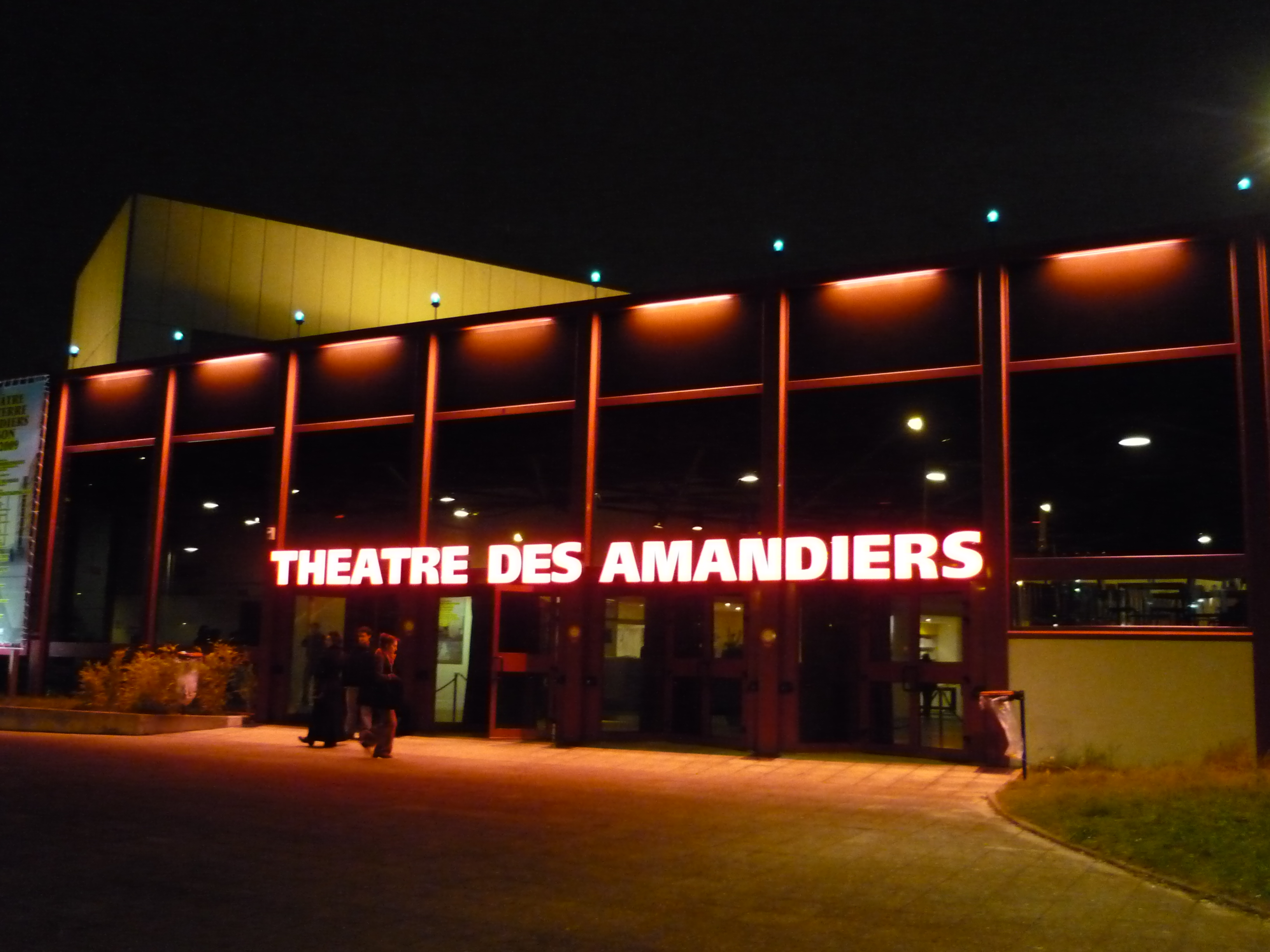
- Interactive map of Théâtre Nanterre-Amandiers
- Address: 7 avenue Pablo Picasso; Nanterre; France
- Coordinates: 48.8932°N 2.2140°E
- Capacity: 900
- Type: Public theatre

Construction
- Opened: 1976

Website
- www.nanterre-amandiers.com

The Théâtre Nanterre-Amandiers (French pronunciation: [teɑtʁ nɑ̃tɛʁ amɑ̃dje]), also Théâtre des Amandiers, is a theatre in Nanterre and a known theatre outside of Paris. The present building opened in 1976. The company is a Centre dramatique national (National dramatic center), a national public theatre. Artistic directors included Patrice Chéreau and Catherine Tasca (1982), Jean-Pierre Vincent (1990) and Jean-Louis Martinelli (2002). The theatre runs a film studio and an acting school which is connected to theatre studies at the Paris West University Nanterre La Défense.

== History ==
The theatre developed from the Festival de Nanterre, first staged in 1965 in a circus tent. In 1966 it was moved to the University of Nanterre. From 1971 it was made a Centre dramatique national, a national public theater, and received public funding.

In 1976 the theatre moved to the Maison de la Culture. That event is considered the inauguration of the theater. The building, which seats 900 people, is at 7 avenue Pablo Picasso in Nanterre. In 1982 the theatre was named Théâtre des Amandiers and directed by Patrice Chéreau and Catherine Tasca. Chéreau established a theatre school and a film studio. His first staging was Combat de nègres et de chiens by Bernard-Marie Koltès, followed by the author's Quai Ouest, Dans la solitude des champs de coton and Le retour au désert. Productions of Arthur Schnitzler's Das weite Land by Luc Bondy and a staged version of Louis-Ferdinand Céline's novel Journey to the End of the Night by André Engel were also notable. Chéreau staged plays by Jean Genet, Pierre de Marivaux, Heiner Müller, Jean Racine, and Shakespeare. The work of Chéreau in the Théâtre Nanterre-Amandiers is depicted in the 2022 French-Italian film Forever Young.

Jean-Pierre Vincent directed the theatre from 1990 to 2001. From 1991 to 2001 Georges Aperghis, the leader of the group L'ATEM, directed music productions. From 2001 to 2013 Jean-Louis Martinelli directed the theatre and Philippe Quesne from 2014 to 2020. In 2021, Christophe Rauck has been appointed Director of the Nanterre-Amandiers Theatre.

== Directors ==
- Maison de la Culture
  - 1969–1974 Pierre Debauche / Pierre Laville
  - 1974–1978 Pierre Debauche
  - 1978–1982 Raoul Sangla
- Centre Dramatique National
  - 1974–1982 Xavier Pommeret
  - 1982–1990 Patrice Chéreau / Catherine Tasca
  - 1990–2001 Jean-Pierre Vincent
  - 2002-2013 Jean-Louis Martinelli
  - 2014-2020 Philippe Quesne
  - since 2021 Christophe Rauck

== Literature ==
- Manfred Brauneck, Gérard Schneilin (editors): Theaterlexikon 1. Begriffe und Epochen, Bühnen und Ensembles. Rowohlt Taschenbuch Verlag Reinbek bei Hamburg, 5th edition, August 2007, ISBN 978-3-499-55673-9.
