= List of avant-garde films of the 2000s =

This is a list of avant-garde and experimental films released in the 2000s.

Title	Director	Cast	Country	Notes
2000
And the Pig was Born	Julius Ziz		Lithuania	
Appearances	Barbara Meter		Netherlands	
As I Was Moving Ahead Occasionally I Saw Brief Glimpses of Beauty	Jonas Mekas		United States	
Dance	Stan Brakhage		United States	
Dancer in the Dark	Lars von Trier	Björk, Catherine Deneuve, David Morse, Peter Stormare, Joel Grey	Denmark	
Energy Lithuania	Deimantas Narkevičius		Lithuania	
The God of Day Had Gone Down Upon Him	Stan Brakhage		United States	
The Heart of the World	Guy Maddin	Leslie Bais, Caelum Vatnsdal, Shaun Balbar	Canada	
Jesus Trilogy and Coda	Stan Brakhage		United States	
Kimono	Hal Hartley	Miho Nikaido	United States	
Little Otik	Jan Švankmajer	Jan Hartl, Veronika Zilkova	Czech Republic; United Kingdom	
Moilsome Toilsome	Stan Brakhage		United States	
Mysterious Object at Noon	Apichatpong Weerasethakul		Thailand	
Persian Series#6	Stan Brakhage		United States	
Persian Series#7	Stan Brakhage		United States	
Persian Series#8	Stan Brakhage		United States	
Persian Series#9	Stan Brakhage		United States	
Persian Series#10	Stan Brakhage		United States	
Persian Series#11	Stan Brakhage		United States	
Persian Series#12	Stan Brakhage		United States	
Songs from the Second Floor	Roy Andersson	Sten Andersson, Bengt C.W. Carlsson, Torbjörn Fahlström, Stefan Larsson, Lars Nordh	Sweden	
A Story about a Bad Dream	Pavel Stingl		Czech Republic	
Water for Maya	Stan Brakhage		United States	
Werckmeister Harmonies	Béla Tarr, Ágnes Hranitzky	Peter Fitz, Lars Rudolph, Hanna Schygulla	Hungary	
2001
386 DX	Alexei Shulgin		Russia	
Baby Jesus	Stan Brakhage		United States	
The Battle of Orgreave	Jeremy Deller		United Kingdom	
Dark Night of the Soul	Stan Brakhage		United States	
Dream Work	Peter Tscherkassky		Austria	
Garden Path	Stan Brakhage		United States	
Her Glacial Speed	Eve Heller		Austria	
Lovesong	Stan Brakhage		United States	Part of Lovesong cycle
Lovesong 2	Stan Brakhage		United States	Part of Lovesong cycle
A Memory of the Players in a Mirror at Midnight	Constanze Ruhm		Austria	
Micro Garden	Stan Brakhage		United States	
Mulholland Dr.	David Lynch	Justin Theroux, Naomi Watts, Laura Elena Harring	United States	
Night Mulch	Stan Brakhage		United States	
Occam's Thread	Stan Brakhage		United States	
Perisan Series#13	Stan Brakhage		United States	
Perisan Series#14	Stan Brakhage		United States	
Perisan Series#15	Stan Brakhage		United States	
Perisan Series#16	Stan Brakhage		United States	
Perisan Series#17	Stan Brakhage		United States	
Perisan Series#18	Stan Brakhage		United States	
Pistol Opera	Seijun Suzuki	Makiko Esumi	Japan	
Rounds	Stan Brakhage		United States	
Les Soviets plus l'électricité	Nicolas Rey		France	
Southlander	Steven Hanft	Rory Cochrane, Rossie Harris, Lawrence Hilton Jacobs	United States	
Very	Stan Brakhage		United States	
Waking Life	Richard Linklater	Wiley Wiggins, Lorelei Linklater, Trevor Jack Brooks	United States	
2002
11'09"01 September 11	Various		France	
Ascension	Stan Brakhage		United States	
Tamala 2010: A Punk Cat in Space	t.o.L		Japan	2D-3D animated black-whie film.
Blissfully Yours	Apichatpong Weerasethakul	Miho Nikaido, D.J. Mendel, Lisa Walter	France; Thailand	
Claire	Milford Thomas	Toniet Gallego, Mish P. DeLight, James Ferguson	United States	
The Cloud of Unknowing	Richard Sylvarnes	Miho Nikaido, D.J. Mendel, Lisa Walter	United States	
*Corpus Callosum	Michael Snow	Kim Plate, Greg Hermanovic, John Massey	Canada	
Decasia	Bill Morrison		United States	
The Decay of Fiction	Pat O'Neill	Various	United States	
Gerry	Gus Van Sant	Casey Affleck, Matt Damon	United States	
I-San Special	Mingmongkol Sonakul	Mesini Kaewratri, Phurida Vichitphan	Thailand	
The Loser Takes It All	Nikos Nikolaidis	Giannis Aggelakas, Simeon Nikolaidis, Jenny Kitseli	Greece	
Max	Stan Brakhage		United States	
Meanwhile a Butterfly Flies	Julius Ziz		Lithuania	
Naqoyqatsi	Godfrey Reggio		United States	
Nikita Kino	Vivan Ostrovsky		United States	
Panels for the Walls of Heaven	Stan Brakhage		United States	Part of the Vancouver Island films
Resurrectus Est	Stan Brakhage		United States	
Russian Ark	Alexander Sokurov	Sergei Dreiden, Maria Kuznetsova, Leonid Mozgovoy	Russia; Canada; Denmark; Germany	
Seasons...	Stan Brakhage		United States	
Song of the Mushroom	Stan Brakhage		United States	
Ten	Abbas Kiarostami	Mania Akbari, Amin Maher	Iran	
The Tracker	Rolf de Heer	David Gulpilil, Gary Sweet, Damon Gameau	Australia	
Uzak	Nuri Bilge Ceylan		Turkey	
2003
( )	Morgan Fisher		United States	
(untitled)	Johann Lurf		Austria	
Alice in Wonderland, or: Who is Guy Debord?	Robert Cauble		United States	
Alila	Amos Gitai	Yael Abecassis, Ronit Elkabetz, Hanna Laslo, Uri Klauzner	Israel	
Bengali Tourist	Sarnath Banerjee		India	
Bodysong	Simon Pummell		United Kingdom	
Chinese Series	Stan Brakhage		United States	
Cowards Bend the Knee	Guy Maddin	Darcy Fehr, Melissa Dionisio, Amy Stewart	Canada	
Dogville	Lars von Trier	Nicole Kidman, John Hurt, Paul Bettany	Denmark	
The Five Obstructions	Lars von Trier, Jørgen Leth	Lars von Trier, Jørgen Leth, Claus Nissen	Denmark	
I Love My India	Tejal Shah		India	
The Mesmerist	Bill Morrison		United States	
The Missing	Lee Kang-Sheng	Lu Yi-ching, Chang Chea, Miao Tien	Taiwan	
Parc central	Dominique Gonzalez-Foerster		France	
Quay	Barbara Meter		Netherlands	
The Role of a Lifetime	Deimantas Narkevičius	Peter Watkins	Lithuania	
The Saddest Music in the World	Guy Maddin	Mark McKinney, Isabella Rossellini, Maria de Medeiros	Canada	
San Yuan Li	Ou Ning, Cao Fei		China	
Scena	Deimantas Narkevičius		Lithuania	
Stan's Window	Stan Brakhage		United States	
Tarnation	Jonathan Caouette		United States	
Tie Xi Qu: West of the Tracks	Wang Bing		China	
Woodenhead	Florian Habicht	Nicholas Butler, Theresa Peters, Tony Bishop	New Zealand	
2004
Anatomy of Hell	Catherine Breillat	Amira Casar, Rocco Siffredi, Catherine Breillat	France	
Cake and Steak	Abigail Child		United States	
The Future is Behind You	Abigail Child		United States	
A Hole in My Heart	Lukas Moodysson	Björn Almroth, Sanna Bråding, Thorsten Flinck, Goran Marjanovic	Sweden	
Innocence	Lucile Hadžihalilović	Zoe Auclair, Berangere Haubruge, Lea Bridarolli	Belgium; United Kingdom; France	
Light is Calling	Bill Morrison		United States	
Mira Corpora	Stéphane Marti		France	
Notre Musique	Jean-Luc Godard	Sarah Adler, Nade Dieu	Switzerland; France	
Once in the XX Century	Deimantas Narkevičius		Lithuania	
Palindromes	Todd Solondz	Ellen Barkin, Stephen Adly-Guirgis, Jennifer Jason Leigh	United States	
Planet Earth: Dreams	D.J. Mendel	Tim Donovan Jr., Denise Greber	United States	
Proteus	David Lebrun	Marian Seldes, Corey Burton, Richard Dysart	United States	
The Raspberry Reich	Bruce LaBruce	Susanne Sachsse, Daniel Batscher	Germany	
Scenes from Freedonia	Cordelia Swann		United Kingdom	
Stages of Mourning	Sarah Pucill		United Kingdom	
Star Spangled to Death	Ken Jacobs		United States	
Tropical Malady	Apichatpong Weerasethakul	Banlop Lomnoi, Sakda Kaewbuadee	Italy; Germany; Thailand; France	
X-Nana - Subroutine	Constanze Ruhm		Austria	
Yes	Sally Potter		United Kingdom	
2005
Blockade	Sergei Loznitsa		Ukraine	
Bye Bye Havana	J. Michael Seyfert		Cuba	
Drawing Restraint 9	Matthew Barney	Matthew Barney, Björk	United States	
Instructions for a Light and Sound Machine	Peter Tscherkassky		Austria	
Johanna	Kornél Mundruczó	Orsolya Toth, Zsolt Trill, Eszter Wierdl	Hungary	
Kinetta	Yorgos Lanthimos		Greece	
Last Days	Gus Van Sant	Michael Pitt, Lukas Haas, Asia Argento	United States	
Lunacy	Jan Švankmajer	Pavel Liska, Jan Triska, Anna Geislerová	Slovakia; Czech Republic	
Manderlay	Lars von Trier	Bryce Dallas Howard, Isaach de Bankolé, Danny Glover	Netherlands; Sweden; Denmark; Italy; France; United Kingdom; Germany	
Matrioškos	Deimantas Narkevičius		Lithuania	
One Day in People's Poland	Maciej Drygas		Poland	
The Piano Tuner of Earthquakes	Stephen Quay, Timothy Quay		United Kingdom	
Rubber Johnny	Chris Cunningham		United Kingdom	
The Space Between	Brad Butler, Noor Afshan Mirza		United Kingdom	
Straight 8	Avisha Abraham		India	
Super Mario Bros. Movie	Cory Arcangel, Paper Rad		United States	
Untitled No. 1	Masha Godovannaya		Russia	
The Wayward Cloud	Tsai Ming-Liang	Lee Kang-Sheng, Chen Shiang-Chyi, Lu Yi-ching	Taiwan; France	
Welt Spiegel Kino	Gustav Deutsch		Austria	
What is it?	Crispin Glover	Michael Blevins, Rikky Wittman, John Insinna	United States	
The Wild Blue Yonder	Werner Herzog	Brad Dourif	Denmark; France; Germany	
The Zero Years	Nikos Nikolaidis	Vicky Harris, Jenny Kitselli, Arhontisa Mavrakaki	Greece	
2006
'All that's solid melts into air' (Karl Marx)	Vong Phaophanit		Vietnam	
Brand Upon the Brain!	Guy Maddin	Erik Steffen Maahs, Gretchen Lee Krich, Sullivan Brown	United States; Canada	
Container	Lukas Moodysson	Peter Lorentzon, Mariha Aberg, Jena Malone	Sweden	
Daft Punk's Electroma	Thomas Bangalter, Guy-Manuel de Homem-Christo	Peter Hurteau, Michael Reich	United States	
Dark Glass	Clio Barnard		United Kingdom	
East Side Story	Igor Grubić		Croatia	
Glass Lips	Lech Majewski	Patryk Czajka, Joanna Litwin, Grzegorz Przybyl	United States; Poland	
Gradiva	Alain Robbe-Grillet		France	
The Highwater Trilogy	Bill Morrison		United States	
Inland Empire	David Lynch	Laura Dern, Jeremy Irons, Harry Dean Stanton	Poland; France; United States	
The Surging Sea of Humanity	Ken Jacobs		United States	
Zidane: A 21st Century Portrait	Douglas Gordon, Philippe Parreno	Zinedine Zidane	United Kingdom; France; Spain	
2007
Caesural Variation I	Raqs Media Collective		India	
The Head	Deimantas Narkevičius	Lev Kerbel	Lithuania	
It Is Fine! Everything Is Fine	Crispin Glover	Steven C. Stewart, Margit Carstensen, Carrie Szlasa	United States	
Japan Japan	Lior Shamriz	Imri Kahn	Israel	
Lovely Andrea	Hito Steyerl		Japan	
Manuelle Labor	Marie Losier	Marie Losier	United States	
Mister Lonely	Harmony Korine	Diego Luna, Samantha Morton, Denis Lavant	Ireland; United States; United Kingdom; France	
My Winnipeg	Guy Maddin	Ann Savage	Canada	
Revisiting Solaris	Deimantas Narkevičius	Donatas Banionis, Deimantas Narkevičius	Lithuania	
You, the Living	Roy Andersson	Björn Englund, Elisabet Helander, Jessika Lundberg	Sweden	
The Full Monteverdi	John La Bouchardiere	I Fagiolini	United Kingdom	
VERTIGO RUSH	Johann Lurf		Austria	
2008
12 Explosions	Johann Lurf		Austria	
History of Cinema	Rouzbeh Rashidi		Iran; Ireland	Short film
Langue sacrée, langue parlée	Nurith Aviv		France; Israel	
Synecdoche, New York	Charlie Kaufman	Philip Seymour Hoffman, Samantha Morton	United States	
Tony Conrad, DreaMinimalist	Marie Losier	Tony Conrad	United States	
Waltz With Bashir	Ari Folman		Germany; France; Israel	
2009
Antichrist	Lars von Trier	Charlotte Gainsbourg, Willem Dafoe, Storm Acheche Sahlstrøm	Denmark	
Atlantiques	Mati Diop		Senegal	
Cinématon	Gérard Courant		France	
Dogtooth	Yorgos Lanthimos	Christos Stergioglou, Michelle Valley, Angeliki Papoulia, Mary Tsoni, Christos Passali	Greece	
Guilt (2009 film)	Vassilis Mazomenos	Nikos Arvanitis, Yannis Tsortekis, Arto Apartian	Greece	
Enter the Void	Gaspar Noé	Paz de la Huerta, Nathaniel Brown	France	
Into the Unknown	Deimantas Narkevičius		Lithuania	
Trash Humpers	Harmony Korine	Rachel Korine, Brian Kotzur, Travis Nicholson	United States; United Kingdom	
Ville Marie	Alexandre Larose		Canada	
Wild Grass	Alain Resnais	Sabine Azéma, André Dussollier, Anne Consigny	France; Italy	
Saturn Returns	Lior Shamriz	Chloé Griffin, Tal Meiri, Heinz Emigholz	Germany	
The Quick Brown Fox Jumps Over the Lazy Dog	Johann Lurf		Austria	
