= Constanze Ruhm =

Austrian filmmaker and professor (born 1965)

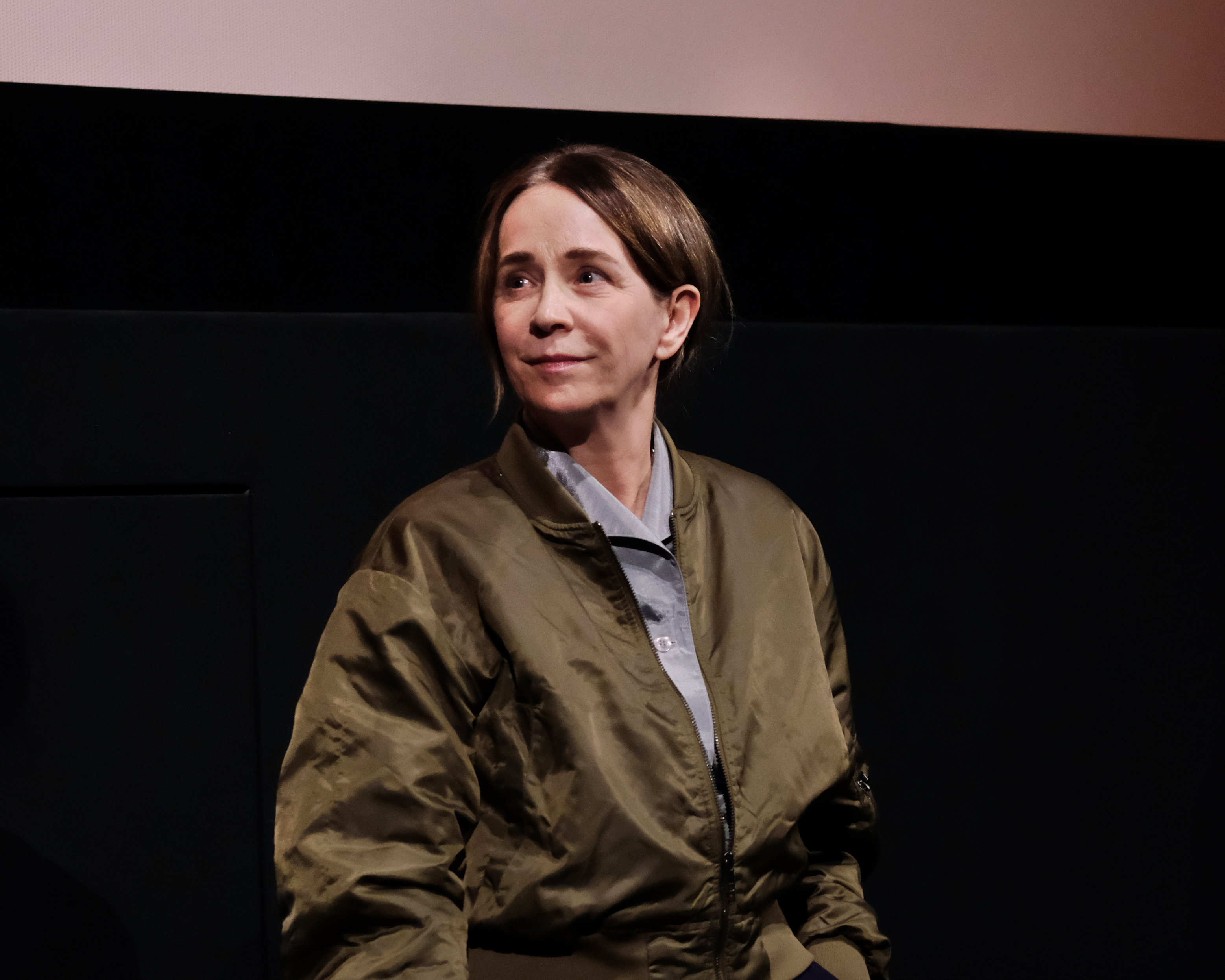
- Ruhm at the Munich Film Archive in 2025
- Born: Vienna, Austria
- Citizenship: Austria
- Education: Academy of Applied Arts, Städelschule
- Occupations: Director; producer; screenwriter; professor; visual artist; curator
- Years active: 1987--present

Constanze Ruhm (born 1965) is an Austrian filmmaker, screenwriter, artist, author, professor, and curator. Her works include films, videos, installations, photographs, texts, and digital projects. She graduated from the Academy of Applied Arts in Vienna and the Städelschule in Frankfurt. Since 1996, she has been teaching internationally as a professor of film and video art. In 2006, she became a tenured professor at the Academy of Fine Arts in Vienna.

Ruhm lives and works in Vienna and Berlin.

== Education ==
Ruhm began studying visual media design with Peter Weibel at the Academy of Applied Arts in 1987. In the early 1990s, she moved with Weibel to the Städelschule in Frankfurt, where she became increasingly exposed to film and media theory discourses from Germany and France. During this time, she worked as a research assistant for artists such as Dara Birnbaum and Matt Mullican. She received her diploma from the Academy of Applied Arts in 1993, while continuing to work at the Städelschule until 1994.

== Career ==
Ruhm spent the year of 1995-96 working on projects in New York. In 1996/97, Ruhm was a visiting professor for visual media at the Offenbach am Main College of Design. In 1998, she received the Schindler Scholarship from the Museum of Applied Arts and as a result spent a year as artist-in-residence at the MAK Center for Art and Architecture in Los Angeles. From 1999 to 2001, she was Vice President of the Vienna Secession. From 2000 to 2003, Ruhm worked at the Künstlerhaus in Stuttgart, curating projects with Fareed Armaly.

In 2005/2006, she was appointed professor of film and video at the Merz Akademie in Stuttgart. Since 2006, she has held a professorship at the Academy of Fine Arts in Vienna, in the Department of Art and Digital Media. From 2007 to 2011, alongside her work in Vienna, she was an adjunct professor at Lesley University in Cambridge, Massachusetts. In 2017, she founded the queer feminist concept choir Mala Sirena with musician Florian Paul Ebner. In 2023, the Austrian Film Museum dedicated a retrospective to Ruhm's film and video work.

== Ruhm's style, technique and themes ==
In her artistic work, Ruhm explores film, other media, and archives, as well as feminist historiography.

Her practice is characterized by an interest in dramaturgically open and networked figures, in the reciprocal constitutional processes of theory and artistic production and, in authorship, in the transition between cinema and new media. Ruhm's work oscillates between a decoding of representational chains and performative shifts.

She often accompanies her films with installations that expand on the films' ideas, themes and references.

=== Early digital work ===
Ruhm's initial work was in digital art: at the time she was working with Weibel, Birnbaum and Mullican—creating 3D environments for the latter—it was a field that "appeared unbelievably promising and exciting." The culmination of this period in her work was her collaboration with Peter Sandbichler on an installation for the Venice Biennale of 1995. But shortly after this project, her interest in narrative cinema came to the fore, though still filtered through her background in digital art, as she reworked and re-envisioned the presuppositions of the earlier form by means of the new medium.

"Since the late 1990s, [Ruhm's] work has been characterized mainly by references to certain films." Apartment (1998), while still a digital piece, explicitly evokes a classic film of the French New Wave, Jean-Luc Godard's Contempt (Le mépris), foregrounding "the representation of female characters within the cosmology of this male-dominated auteur cinema." In Ruhm's reworking of the breakup between the characters played by Brigitte Bardot and Michel Piccoli,

I digitally reconstructed the apartment where this separation takes place [...]. A tracking camera moved through this digitally created architecture, following Brigitte Bardot's body and her patterns of moment, so that all the paths she takes in this key scene are reflected in the continuous movement of the virtual camera. Thus, the gaze of the camera is turned away from the female body as an object and represented as a subjective perspective. [...] Much of what I would be dealing with later was already being applied here: the focus on the female figure in cinema, a dislocation in the staging of the gaze, analysis of the relationship between director and representation, staging and representation, as well as the interest in cinematic architecture, which would later become very important.

=== A move to working with actors and scripted features; the "seven characters" ===
In 2001, Ruhm started the process of moving "to real, analogue space, to work with real people, with actors [...].". This provided a better match with her literary background: "[M]y works develop not least from a writing practice, from text, and through narrative storytelling, or rather through the script." But one last digital work, A Memory of the Players in a Mirror at Midnight (2002), named after a Joyce poem, served as a bridge between the digital period and the shift toward working with actors. Like Apartment, A Memory is built upon a digital reconstitution of a set from a narrative feature, in this case Irvin Kershner's Eyes of Laura Mars. But the narration of Ruhm's work is based on an assemblage of the dialogue of female characters from that film as well as from several other films—what Ruhm calls her "matrix films." In the decade to come, she will return regularly to these characters and films in her projects. In addition to the character of Laura Mars played by Faye Dunaway in Kershner's film, these characters include:

- Nana, from Godard's Vivre sa vie (originally played by Anna Karina)
- Giuliana, from Antonioni's Red Desert (originally played by Monica Vitti)
- Alma, from Bergman's Persona (originally played by Bibi Andersson)
- Bree, from Alan J. Pakula's Klute (originally played by Jane Fonda)
- Hari, from Tarkovsky's Solaris (originally played by Natalya Bondarchuk)
- Rachel, from Ridley Scott's Blade Runner (originally played by Sean Young)

A Memory exists both as a standalone 26-minute film and as an installation. In a review of the installation, Michael Hall noted that Ruhm "sifted through this popular suspense film and eliminated nearly all the pertinent information, except for the elements that most interested her [...] leaving an obscure digital picture that looked neither real nor fake." In this process of "emptying out" the original film, "Ruhm's main concern centers on how the space of cinematic narratives and the stories invented by others can add to the understanding of our own social reality."

X Characters / RE(hers)AL (2003) was Ruhm's first film with on-screen actors. Here all seven of the characters appear in the flesh and interact with each other. Ruhm worked out the script in a collaborative process with seven friends, each focusing on one of the main roles. The film was shot in Berlin, with help from colleagues such as Harun Farocki, a fellow professor at the Academy in Vienna. In the film the seven characters,

due to a series of flight delays [...] find themselves stranded together in an airport lobby and strike up a conversation. It's about the question of how fictional protagonists can survive their supposed death and continue to exist in other versions beyond the end of the film.

Ruhm had originally planned on naming the series of films X Characters in Search of an Author, alluding to the Pirandello play. As for the "X" with which the titles of this film and the two next ones begin, normally it "is used in theater and film production to mark the position of an actor, and is applied with chalk or tape to a usually black-painted wooden floor. In her films, Constanze Ruhm turns the 'X' into a protagonist, into a transmitter between character and space."

X Characters is also her first film in which rehearsals play a key on-screen role. The exploration of the world of rehearsals—the postures, the gestures, the struggles, the shifts in identity—will become an integral part of nearly all of her films up to the present day. "The rehearsal as form and method forms the basis for most of my works."

X NaNa / Subroutine (2004), in which Farocki has a small role, was the first in an intended series of standalone films about each of the seven characters—thus a "subroutine" of the main "program" featuring all seven. X NaNa imagines Godard's Nana (who prefers spelling her name with two capital "N"s) working in a record shop while participating in hacking operations and interrogating her creator via an Internet chat screen. The soundtrack echoes her name through judicious selections from various pop songs.

Ultimately the only other film made in the series of standalone films was X Love Scenes / Pearls without a String (2007), centered on Giuliana. Here the "X", drawn on a piece of black cloth used in film shoots and called a "flag," figures physically and prominently as Giuliana, now an actress, not only plays herself but also Bree and Hari, "creating a kaleidoscopic fragmentation of identities." She is often obliged to act with the flag as her only partner (this is an evocation of a real film shoot during which Maureen O'Hara often had to perform love scenes alone with such a flag while her co-star Errol Flynn was too drunk to function). The director, also a woman, is a relatively overbearing, unfriendly presence, often criticizing Giuliana's acting. Only Nana, who has become a script supervisor in this film, tries to give Giuliana constructive advice.

Crash Site / My_Never_Ending_Burial_Plot (2010) was the last of Ruhm's films to feature any of the seven characters. Here, those remaining are Hari, Nana, and Giuliana, who has become "Julian" and is played by a male actor (wearing a slip). Although it is not presented as such, the film could be seen as centered on Hari this time, as

she comes to a clearing and meets female figures from other movies, some of them male after a sex change, all of them unstable characters who share her condition and attempt, loop-like, to kill themselves (or others in their place). Suicide seems to be the only way out of the vortex of the story, the only way to assume power over one's own identity, an Oedipus interruptus. But this fails precisely because those attempting to perform it lack their own lives.

The other characters therefore emulate Hari's behavior in Solaris where she attempts more than once to commit suicide but is unsuccessful, being a mere projection from the surface of the planet Solaris.

Film	Nana	Giuliana	Alma	Bree	Hari	Laura Mars	Rachel
A Memory of the Players in a Mirror at Midnight	Yes	Yes	Yes	Yes	Yes	Yes	Yes
X Characters / RE(hers)AL	Yes	Yes	Yes	Yes	Yes	Yes	Yes
X NaNa / Subroutine	Yes						
X Love Scenes / Pearls without a String	Yes	Yes		Yes	Yes		
Crash Site / My_Never_Ending_Burial_Plot	Yes	Yes —as "Julian"			Yes		

=== Partnerships with co-directors ===
==== Cold Rehearsal ====
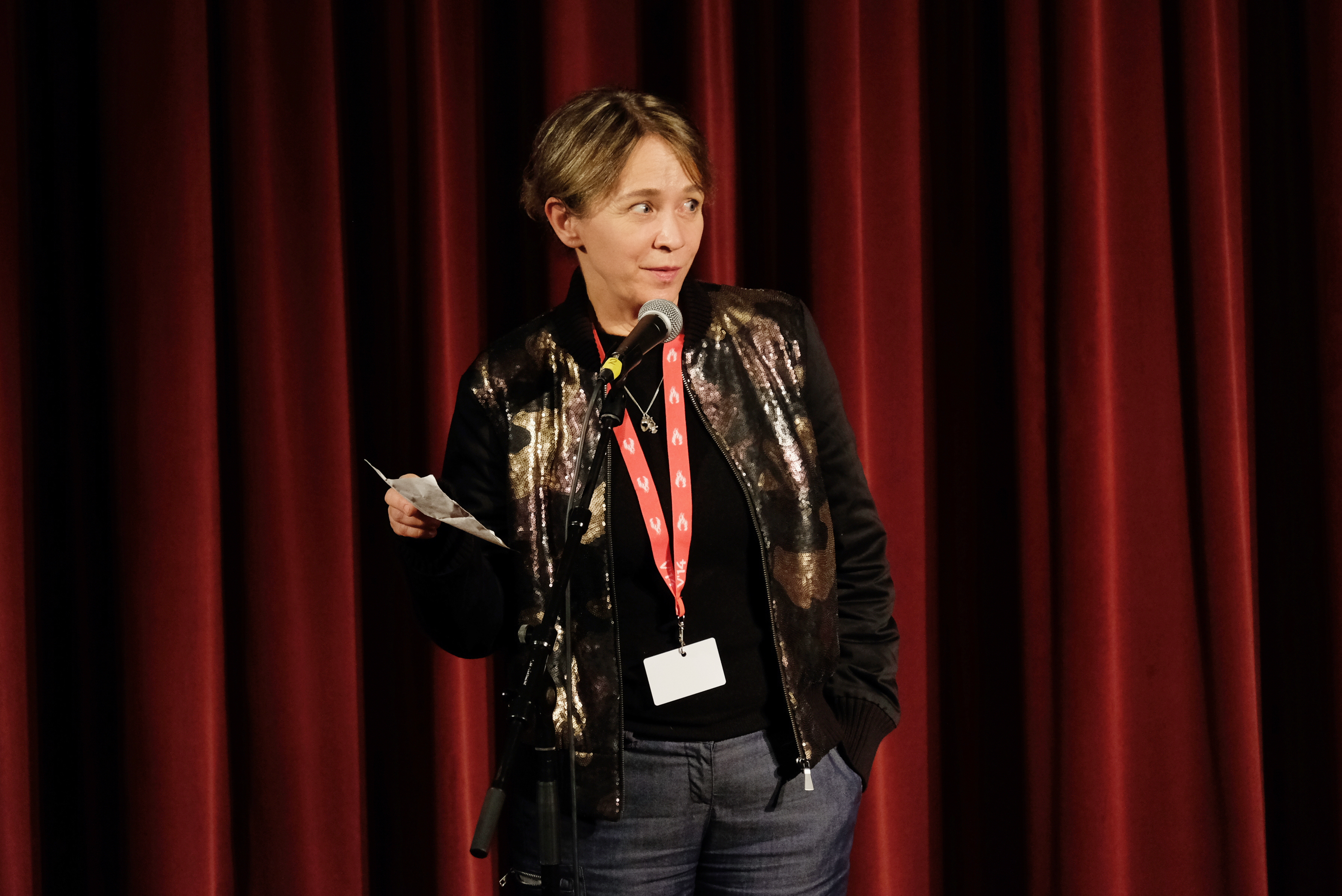
Constanze Ruhm (2020)

The end of the period centered on the seven characters inaugurated a new one where Ruhm worked in collaboration with other directors. Again, a film bridges the divide between the two periods: in this case, it is Cold Rehearsal (Kalte Probe) (2011/12), co-directed by Christine Lang. The two main characters are Anna, clearly based on Anna Karina and as such a callback to Nana from the earlier films, and Hans, played by the same actor who played Julian in the previous film and evoking a name Godard used to pseudonymously sign several articles of film criticism.

The film begins, however, with three figures who Ruhm has identified as dead actresses formerly in Hans's films and marooned in a realm of detritus—a patch of land with folding chairs and a tent—that she calls "hell." But she has also said that the characters from the earlier series "find themselves together again," implying that the actresses are continuations or interpolations of the seven earlier characters. The actresses exact punishment on Hans by imagining him as a janitor on a talk show, made to appear on it as a guest with Anna (Note: This is an allusion to an appearance by Godard and Karina on a French talk show in the 1980s, years after their separation.) (played by one of the dead actresses). Through a process of redoubling he is also forced to witness the events in the talk show studio with two other instances of Anna (played by the other two dead actresses) and himself (always himself, sometimes dirtier, sometimes stupider).

Other elements connect Cold Rehearsal to the earlier series: some of the actors (Judith van der Werff, Irina Kastrinidis, Dominic Oley); a sardine can; shovels for digging graves and knocking people unconscious; and the male character explaining that he is undergoing an identity crisis. "The film explores forms of female (self-)representation and the autonomy of female film characters as opposed to their male writers and directors." The dialogue in the film serves as "hidden instructions for the plot as well as its interpretation, thereby exposing the cinematic illusion -- in a very Brechtian sense -- by laying bare the modes of production." Ruhm has reiterated this lineage of her work: "By showing the contrived aspect of fiction, I am working in the Brechtian tradition, so to speak."

==== Panoramis Paramount Paranormal ====
Panoramis Paramount Paranormal (2014–16), co-directed by Emilien Awada, continues the connection with Godard and Karina. The film starts at Le Panoramis, an apartment complex in the Paris suburbs that was once the site of the Saint-Maurice studios, the French division of Paramount. Godard had shot scenes from A Woman Is a Woman at these studios. However, Ruhm saw this film as the beginning of a "new cycle" where "the form has become much more open and essayistic." Indeed, the film is less dominated by on-screen characters and features long passages of the surroundings of Le Panoramis with only ambient sound and the occasional passerby.

Alongside Laurent Lacotte, actors from Ruhm's previous films rehearse passages from Marcel Carné's Juliette, or Key of Dreams, a film shot at the Saint-Maurice studios. They alternate between French and German, an allusion to the former practice of filming versions of films in multiple languages on the same sets with different directors and lead actors. Again, this was a practice associated with these studios.

The "paranormal" element of the film comes from two ghosts who prolong in a sense the role played in the earlier films by characters existing beyond their original films, or dead actresses imposing plotlines from their place in hell. For Stefanie Schulte Strathaus, the film "examines the role of cinema in the production of memory." She then quotes an unpublished text by Ruhm: "What form does the work against oblivion have to assume, and how can you live in peace with the specters, and should one even wish for it? Derrida responds that one cannot do anything but learn to live with the phantoms [...]."

=== The "Italian period" ===
In 2012 Schulte Strathaus invited Ruhm to participate in "Living Archive -- Archive Work as a Contemporary Artistic and Curatorial Practice," a long-term project of the Berlin Arsenal "in which artists are encouraged to appropriate and rework the films and footage stored in [its] vaults." Here, Ruhm encountered the film Anna (1975) by Alberto Grifi and Massimo Sarchielli. Schulte Strathaus has suggested that "it may have caught her eye because of its title: Anna, like Anna Karina [...]." Jan Lumholdt describes it as a "three-hour-plus cinéma vérité piece [...] [s]hot on video in 1972" that "portrays a 16-year-old homeless drug addict who is eight months pregnant, discovered by the directors in central Rome and intimately explored, possibly also exploited, throughout the movie."

On the basis of the Grifi/Sarchielli film, Ruhm created Gli appunti di Anna Azzori / Uno specchio che viaggia nel tempo (The Notes of Anna Azzori / A Mirror that Travels through Time) (2019). But here again, as with Ruhm's earlier works, we have the theme of the character rebelling against her representation. In her article on Ruhm's film, Marina Pavido imagines Anna's thoughts: "What do these men want from her? Why do they film her? Why do they laugh when they talk about her in her absence?" We also have examples of Ruhm's predilection for revealing the "reverse shot" of what is shown, or what was "left on the cutting room floor." The "notes" of the title did not really exist, except in a slip of the tongue by one of the directors in a moment that was cut out of the original film; Ruhm provides them through "Anna's" voiceover (the casting of "Anna" is characteristically a major component of her film). In another outtake of the original film, Ruhm discovered Anna's last name, which is never mentioned in the finished product whereas all the other members of the crew were duly credited with their full names.

Ruhm's discovery of Anna "prompted her to undertake studies in the history of the Italian feminism of the 1970s." Around the same time, the Belvedere Museum in Vienna, which had presented a solo exhibition of Ruhm's work featuring Apartment in their 20er Haus space in 1998, renewed their interest in her work by proposing another collaboration. "In this instance, she delved into the history of the women's movement in Italy and discovered the Italian writer and art critic Carla Lonzi, who passed away too early." While doing research for Gli appunti di Anna Azzori Ruhm had come across the Casa Internazionale delle Donne (International Women's House) in Rome, and the herSTORY archive located there. On the basis of its resources, she developed La strada (è ancora) più lunga (2021), first a series of photographs and then an installation. She later incorporated the photographs into the exhibition Come una pupilla al variare della luce (2023) at the Belvedere, which also featured screenings of Gli appunti di Anna Azzori.

The research incorporated into La strada, Come une pupilla and another installation, A Shard is a Fragment of a Life, found filmic form in Ruhm's most recent feature, È a questo punto che nasce il bisogno di fare storia (It Is at This Point That the Need to Write History Arises) (2024). Here she combines her exploration of the work of Lonzi—and the Rivolta Femminile group that Lonzi co-founded—with a look back at the Précieuses, "a group of proto-feminist activists" in 17th century France. Molière parodied this movement in his plays Les précieuses ridicules and Les femmes savantes. (Note: However, in the preface to the published version of Les précieuses ridicules, Molière did say that "the true Precieuses would be in the wrong to be angry, when the pretentious Ones are exposed, who imitate them awkwardly.")

The seventeenth-century phenomenon of the précieuses is of great interest to Lonzi, who identifies with the lives of those intellectual women, discredited and ridiculed for "publicly expressing the desire to refuse and defer physical love, and for presuming to judge authors’ works, thereby trespassing into the phallic domain." The précieuses were women who, for the first time on the scene of French belles lettres, "spoke out for their own eroticism and claimed a self-bestowed faculty of judgement," two elements that clearly resonate with the pillars of feminism as practised by Rivolta. [...] Historically deprived of the privilege of being able to narrate themselves from their own perspectives, women have often been turned into grotesque caricatures by the gaze and the pen of authors such as Molière. [...] The unfortunate protagonist of the Femmes savantes is Armande, with whom Lonzi identifies at a difficult time in her life.

At one point in her film, Ruhm imagines an encounter between Lonzi and Armande.

Many sections of È a questo punto are accompanied only by an ambient soundscape: this is in particular the case for reenactments of paintings by Artemisia Gentileschi. The film is thus a development of the "open and essayistic" direction that Ruhm has pursued since Panoramis. But Godard has not been forgotten: the restaged paintings recall similar tableaux in Passion, and there are several images of hands reaching out to each other, a motif seen in Nouvelle Vague and Goodbye to Language among others. Unlike Godard's films, however, no men participate in these tableaux, and the women involved are staging themselves, imagining their own representations. The film also features archival footage of feminist demonstrations in Italy in the 1970s. Sight and Sound listed it as one of the best video essays of 2024.

== Works ==
=== Filmography ===
- 1998: Apartment (18 min., b/w, silent)
- 1999: Evidence (5:30 min., color, silent)
- 1999: ID Remix (4:55 min., color, silent) (co-director: Elisabeth Fiege)
- 1999/2005: Travelling / Plan 234 / Extérieur Nuit (2:40 min., b/w, silent)
- 2001: A Memory of the Players in a Mirror at Midnight (26 min., color, sound)
- 2003-04: X Characters / RE(hers)AL (62 min., color, sound)
- 2004: X NaNa / Subroutine (30 min., color, sound)
- 2007: X Love Scenes / Pearls without a String (58 min., color, sound)
- 2010: Crash Site / My_Never_Ending_Burial_Plot (69 min., color, sound)
- 2011-12: Kalte Probe (Cold Rehearsal) (90 min., color, sound) (co-director: Christine Lang)
- 2012: Trailer Park (26 min., color, sound) (co-director: Christine Lang)
- 2014-16: Panoramis Paramount Paranormal (54 min., color, sound) (co-director: Emilien Awada)
- 2015: Comparing Local Spectres (18 min., b/w, sound)
- 2019: Gli appunti di Anna Azzori / Uno specchio che viaggia nel tempo (The Notes of Anna Azzori / A Mirror that Travels through Time) (72 min., color, sound)
- 2020: Pearls Without a String -- Trailer (3 min., color, sound)
- 2020: Pearls Without a String (72 min., color, sound)
- 2023: Dark Mirrors Turning Brighter (2:36 min., b/w, silent)
- 2024: È a questo punto che nasce il bisogno di fare storia (It Is at This Point That the Need to Write History Arises) (96 min., color & b/w, sound)

=== Installations ===
- 2013: Replay: ANNA
- 2021: La strada (è ancora) più lunga (2 channel installation / 2 x 60 min., color, sound)
- 2023: A Shard is a Fragment of a Life (2 channel installation / 2 x 23 min., color, sound)
- 2024: A Woman's Work is Never Done (2 channel installation / 2 x 12 min., color, sound)

=== Photographic works ===
- 1993: Un Coup De Dés, series of photographs / 3D-objects based on Mallarmé's poem
- 1997-98: Day for Night, series of digital photographs (C-print on aluminum): "10:45" (105 × 230 cm), "Cendrier" (105 × 230 cm), "Surdité" (105 × 230 cm), "Scaffold" (105 × 230 cm)
- 1999: Off, series of six digital photographs (C-print on aluminum): "Suburbia," "Desert," "Dancing," "Swamp," "Two Suns," "Kiss"
- 1999: Evidence, series of digital photographs (C-print on aluminum): "Snack" (180 × 300 cm), "Hut" (240 × 180 cm), "Terror" (214 x 180 cm), "Hangar" (214 x 180 cm)
- 2001-02: A Memory of the Players in a Mirror at Midnight, series of four photographs
- 2008: Renewal of Perspective: La Difficulté d'Être, series of 24 photographs, 37 x 25 cm, color (Photos: Jean-Luc Bertini)
- 2013: La Difficulté d'Une Perspective: A Life of Renewal, series of 22 photographs, variable dimensions, color (Photos: Emilien Awada)
- 2016: Panoramis Paramount Paranormal
- 2021: La strada (è ancora) più lunga, series of 59 analogue photographs, 41 cm x 28,5 cm
- 2024: A Woman's Work Is Never Done, series of 24 analogue photographs, 40 x 50 cm, b/w baryta prints

=== Selected exhibitions ===
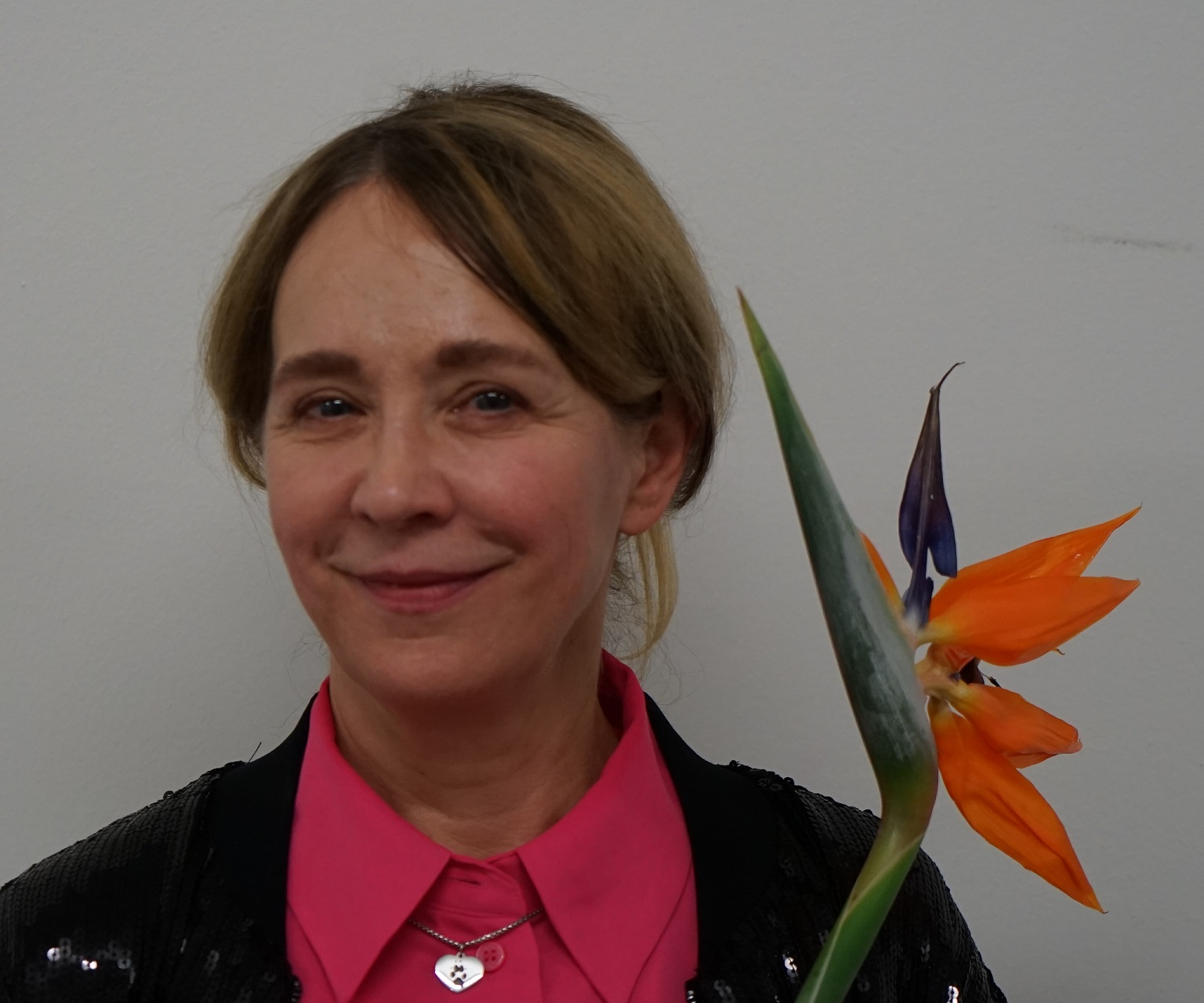
Constanze Ruhm (2023)

==== Solo exhibitions ====
- 1991: A House Has a Top and Four Walls, Galerie Krinzinger, Vienna
- 1993: True / False / Else, Neue Galerie, Graz
- 1994: Secret of Life (with Peter Sandbichler), Galerie Grita Insam, Vienna
- 1994: Ars Electronica: Intelligente Ambiente (with Sandbichler), Brucknerhaus, Linz (new presentation of Secret of Life)
- 1995: kanal (with Sandbichler), Galerie Gaudens Pedit, Lienz, Austria
- 1995: kanal / The Media Pavilion (with Sandbichler), Austrian Pavilion, Venice Biennale
- 1995: The (W)hole Room (with Sandbichler), Galerie Trabant, Vienna
- 1996: knot.project (with Sandbichler), New York (a project in various spaces around the city such as the New Museum, Cooper Union, and the Austrian Cultural Institute)
- 1997: bo.track.32, Public Netbase, Vienna
- 1998: ...time and not the end of desire... (curated by Rainer Fuchs), mumok, 20er Haus, Vienna
- 1998: 10:45 / and then I often think of you (with Gert Rappenecker), Menotti Gallery, Baden / Vienna
- 1999: Apartment, Tyrolean State Museum Ferdinandeum, Innsbruck
- 1999: Off, Kerstin Engholm Gallery, Vienna
- 2000: Art Statements, Art Basel
- 2000: Never Alone Again, La Panadería, Mexico City
- 2001: A Memory of the Players in a Mirror at Midnight, Entwistle Gallery, London, and Kerstin Engholm Gallery, Vienna
- 2003: blindstorey / silencetracks, commissioned work for the collection of Admont Abbey, Austria
- 2003: Constanze Ruhm, Remont Gallery, Belgrade (as part of the 2nd International Danube Conference on Art and Culture)
- 2004: X Subroutines, Kunsthalle Bern
- 2005: X NaNa / Subroutine (The Difficulty of Being), Kerstin Engholm Gallery, Vienna
- 2007: X Love Scenes, Kerstin Engholm Gallery, Vienna
- 2010: X Love Scenes/Pearls Without a String, The UAG / Room Gallery, University of California, Irvine
- 2010: My_Never_Ending_Burial_Plot, Kerstin Engholm Gallery, Vienna
- 2012: Trailer Park (with Christine Lang), Galerie der Stadt Schwaz, Schwaz
- 2013: Garage Exchange: Constanze Ruhm & Christine Lang and First Office, MAK Center for Art and Architecture, Mackey Apartments Garage Top, Los Angeles
- 2014: Panoramis Paramount Paranormal (with Emilien Awada), Kerstin Engholm Gallery, Vienna
- 2015: Constanze Ruhm Re: Rehearsals (No Such Thing as Repetition), Zeit Kunst Niederösterreich, Lower Austria Museum, St. Pölten
- 2021: La strada (è ancora) più lunga, Kulturni center Tobačna 001, Ljubljana (as part of the When Gesture Becomes Event exhibition, but in Ljubljana the works by other artists were presented at the Mestna Galerija)
- 2023: Come una pupilla al variare della luce, Belvedere Museum, Vienna
- 2024: A Woman's Work Is Never Done -- the Culture of Women for the Preservation of Humanity, Charim Galerie, Vienna

==== Group exhibitions -- 1980s-1990s ====
- 1987: Cultura Digitalis, Academy of Applied Arts, Vienna
- 1988: Samples, Skala, Vienna
- 1992: Découvertes (with U.K.F.), Grand Palais, Paris
- 1992: Visual Communications Lab, Boğaziçi University, Istanbul
- 1992: CVC -- Computer Video Camera, Galerie Grita Insam, Vienna
- 1992: Die Idee einer Sammlung -- 20 Jahre Galerie Grita Insam, Dorotheum, Vienna
- 1992: On Justifying the Hypothetical Character of Art and Its Non-Identicality in the Object World (in collaboration with Peter Weibel), Galerie Tanja Grunert, Cologne
- 1993: Eigenwelt der Apparatewelt, Institut für Neue Medien an der Städelschule, Frankfurt am Main
- 1993: Photosynthese, Galerie Vorsetzen, Hamburg
- 1993: Eigenwelt der Apparatewelt II, Galerie Stadtpark, Krems
- 1993: Keimfreie Wesen befehlen mir die Galerie keimfrei zu halten, Galerie Hubert Winter, Vienna
- 1993: Gedanken, Skizzen, Entwürfe, Galerie Karin Sachs, Munich
- 1993: Computerkünstler Künstlerwerkstatt Lothringer Straße, Munich
- 1993: Transparenz, Palais Liechtenstein, Feldkirch, Austria
- 1994: Translucent Writings, Neuberger Museum of Art, Purchase, NY / USF Contemporary Art Museum, Tampa, Florida
- 1994: Lokalzeit: Wiener Künstler im Spiegel des Unbehagens, Kunstraum Strohal, Vienna / Museum of Modern Art, Ljubljana / Fondazione Querini, Venice
- 1995: D. O. G. Radio, Internet radio project
- 1995: Auf den Leib geschrieben, Kunsthalle, Vienna
- 1995: Skizzen, Modelle, Notizen, Galerie Martin Janda / Raum für Aktuelle Kunst, Vienna
- 1995: Self Construction, mumok, Vienna
- 1995: Raum annehmen IV, Galerie Grita Insam, Vienna
- 1996: Balance.akte, Niederösterreichische Landesgalerie, Vienna / Kunsthalle, Krems
- 1996: V6 -- We Six, Galerie Brasilica, Vienna
- 1996: Jenseits von Kunst / Beyond Art, Ludwig Museum, Budapest
- 1996: Film Stills, Galerie Grita Insam, Guadalajara
- 1996: Co właściwie sprawia, że dzisiejsze miasta są tak odmienne, tak seksy? (Just what is it that makes today's cities so different, so sexy?), BWA Galerie Grita Insam, Vienna / Państwowa Galeria Sztuki, Łódź
- 1996: Schrägspuren: Tage zeitgenössischer Videokunst in Klagenfurt, Haus der Architektur, Klagenfurt
- 1996: Rom suchen -- Artisti Austriaci a Roma, Palazzo Braschi / Museo di Roma, Rome
- 1996: Dress, Galleria Planita, Rome
- 1996: Habitus, Abito, Abitare, Centro per l'arte contemporanea Luigi Pecci, Prato
- 1996: Out of the Dark, Elga Wimmer Gallery, New York
- 1997: 10 Jahre Trabant, Galerie Trabant, Vienna
- 1997: Freeze Frame, Galerie Grita Insam, Vienna
- 1997: Time Is A Man -- Space Is A Woman, Galleria Viafarini, Milan
- 1997: Jenseits von Kunst / Beyond Art, Neue Galerie, Graz
- 1998: sincerely yours -- Videoart in Austria, Municipal Gallery, Sofia
- 1998: There Might be a Place Where One Goes to Feel Better, MAK Center, Los Angeles
- 1998: Positionen österreichischer Gegenwartskunst / positionen hedendaagse oostenrijkse kunst, Scharpoord, Knokke-Heist, Belgium
- 1998: Die österreichische Vision / A Visão Austriaca / The Austrian Vision / La visión austriaca, mumok, Vienna / Calouste Gulbenkian Foundation, Lisbon / Denver Art Museum, Denver / Museo Nacional de Bellas Artes, Buenos Aires
- 1998: Interactus V, Accademia d'Ungheria, Rome (in cooperation with mumok, Vienna)
- 1998: Bestandsaufnahme Sehen, transmediale, Berlin
- 1999: Richtung Museumsquartier -- Die neue Sammlung, mumok, Vienna
- 1999: Mars, Post Gallery, Los Angeles
- 1999: D.A.CH.com, Galerie Krinzinger at Benger Park, Bregenz
- 1999: Das Jahrhundert der Frauen, Kunstforum, Vienna
- 1999: Punkt Linie Fläche Raum: Abstrakte Fotografie aus den Beständen der Österreichischen Fotogalerie Rupertinum Salzburg, Projektraum im WUK, Vienna
- 1999: D.A.CH.com, Galerie Krinzinger im Semperdepot, Vienna
- 1999: Junge Kunst: Aus der Sammlung Morgenbesser, Kunstverein Horn, Horn, Austria

==== Group exhibitions -- 2000s ====
- 2000: Illicit Form of Meditation, haus.0 program, Künstlerhaus, Stuttgart
- 2000: Skulptur als Möbel / Möbel als Skulptur: Objekte und Grafiken aus der Sammlung der Neuen Galerie Graz, Franziskanerkloster, Frohnleiten
- 2000: Medienturm, Galerie & Edition Artelier, Graz
- 2000: Video Art Festival, Saint Petersburg
- 2000: LKW Lebenskunstwerke -- Kunst in der Stadt 4, Kunsthaus, Bregenz
- 2000: New Austrian Spotlight, Faculty of Fine Arts, Marmara University, Istanbul
- 2000: Kampfzone, Ottakringer Straße 20, Vienna
- 2000: Ankauf: NÖ. Werke aus dem Bestand der Artothek des Bundes, Kunstraum Palais Porcia, Vienna / Karmeliterhof, St. Pölten / Artothek des Bundes, Belvedere Museum, Vienna
- 2000: cultural sidewalk, Gumpendorf 2000, Unit F - büro für mode / NIN.design / Informationsbüro Vektor K. / public and commercial spaces, Vienna
- 2001: Diesseits und jenseits des Traums: 100 Jahre Jacques Lacan, Sigmund Freud Museum, Vienna
- 2001: Im Buchstabenfeld, Neue Galerie, Graz
- 2001: Action, on tourne -- endtroducing, Villa Arson, Nice
- 2001: Shopping, Generali Foundation, Vienna
- 2001: Interiors, Six / Ungar Gallery, Munich
- 2001: Artfilm, Art Basel / Stadtkino, Basel
- 2001: Life goes on, IG Bildende Kunst, Vienna
- 2002: Future Cinema, ZKM, Karlsruhe
- 2002: Transfer, Sammlung Falckenberg / Phönix-Hallen, Hamburg
- 2002: > redirect, haus.0 program, Künstlerhaus, Stuttgart
- 2002: Límits de la percepció, Fundació Joan Miró, Barcelona
- 2002: Uncommon Denominator, Mass MOCA, North Adams MA, USA
- 2002: Travelling, Kunstwerke, Berlin
- 2003: Made for Admont, Auftragsarbeit für die Sammlung Stift, Admont, Austria
- 2004: Busan Biennale, Busan, Korea
- 2004: 3rd Berlin Biennale for Contemporary Art
- 2004: Virtual Frame by 3, Kunsthalle Karlsplatz, Vienna
- 2004: Communauté, Institut d'art contemporain, Villeurbanne
- 2005: The Postmedia Condition, Neue Galerie, Graz
- 2005: Nach Rokytnik -- Die Sammlung der EVN, mumok, Vienna
- 2005: Lebt und arbeitet in Wien II / Living and working in Vienna II, Kunsthalle, Vienna
- 2005: Simultan: Zwei Sammlungen österreichischer Fotografie, Museum der Moderne, Salzburg
- 2006: Demolition, Kerstin Engholm Gallery, Vienna
- 2006: Why Pictures Now, mumok, Vienna
- 2006: The Postmedia Condition, Centro Cultural Conde Duque, Madrid
- 2006: Kino wie noch nie / Cinema like never before, Generali Foundation, Vienna
- 2006: Österreich: 1900-2000 -- Konfrontationen und Kontinuitäten, Essl Museum, Klosterneuburg, Austria
- 2007: Kino wie noch nie / Cinema like never before, Academy of Arts, Berlin
- 2008: System Mensch, Works from the collection of the Museum der Moderne, Salzburg
- 2008: Paraflows, MAK Contemporary Art Depot, Arenbergpark Flak Tower, Vienna
- 2008: Femmes 'R' Us: Feminism in Pop Music Art Film Today, Radialsystem, Berlin (curated by Christine Lang and Ina Wudtke)
- 2008: Mimétisme, Extra City, Antwerp (curated by Anselm Franke)
- 2008: Under Pain of Death, Austrian Cultural Forum, New York
- 2009: Empfindung: In der Nähe der Fehler liegen die Wirkungen, Augarten Contemporary / Belvedere Museum, Vienna (curated by Eva Maria Stadler and Sabeth Buchmann)
- 2009: Die Fragilität des Seins: Ein medialer Bildessay in 9 Kapiteln, Works from the collection of the Museum der Moderne Salzburg, National Museum of Contemporary Art (MNAC), Bucharest, Romania
- 2009: See this Sound, Lentos Art Museum, Linz (curated by Cosima Rainer)
- 2009: Asian Village, as part of the Vienna Festival (curated by Susanne Rogenhofer)
- 2009: Another Tomorrow -- Young Video Art from the Collection of the Neue Galerie Graz, Slought Foundation, Philadelphia
- 2009: Rewind / Fast Forward, Neue Galerie, Graz

==== Group exhibitions -- 2010s-2020s ====
- 2011: Living Archive, Arsenal Institute for Film and Video Art, Berlin (ongoing project, curated by Stefanie Schulte Strathaus)
- 2011: Pieces, Kerstin Engholm Galerie, Vienna
- 2011: History Lessons, mumok, Vienna (curated by Matthias Michalka)
- 2011: Plumpe Spekulation (as part of the project The Art of Knowing / The Limits of Knowledge), Garage X, Vienna
- 2011: Moderne: Selbstmord der Kunst?, Neue Galerie, Graz
- 2012: DLF 1874 -- Die Biografie der Bilder, Camera Austria, Graz (curated by Ruth Horak)
- 2012: Liebhaber des Halbschattens, Metropolis Kino—Kinemathek, Hamburg (curated by Susan Chales de Beaulieu)
- 2012: Utopia Gesamtkunstwerk, 21er Haus, Belvedere Museum, Vienna
- 2012: medien.kunst.sammeln: Perspektiven einer Sammlung, Kunsthaus, Graz
- 2013: Die Sammlung #4, 21er Haus, Belvedere Museum, Vienna
- 2013: Living Archive, Kunstwerke, Berlin
- 2013: Screening Room, Temporary Gallery, Cologne (curated by Regina Barunke)
- 2013: Theatrical Fields, Bildmuseet, Umeå, Sweden (curated by Ute Meta Bauer)
- 2013: FOTOS -- Österreichische Fotografien von den 1930er Jahren bis heute, 21er Haus, Belvedere Museum, Vienna (curated by Severin Dünser and Axel Köhne)
- 2014: There Was Nothing To It: Sigmund Freud and the Play on the Burden of Representation, 21er Haus, Belvedere Museum, Vienna
- 2014: Theatrical Fields, Centre for Contemporary Art, Singapore (curated by Ute Meta Bauer)
- 2015: Forum Expanded, Museum of Modern Art, Seoul (curated by Uli Ziemons)
- 2015: Self-timer Stories, MUSAC, León, Spain (curated by Felicitas Thun-Hohenstein)
- 2015: To the Sound of the Closing Door: FORUM EXPANDED / Berlinale 2015, Academy of Arts, Berlin (curated by Bettina Steinbrügge, Anselm Franke, Nanna Heidenreich, Stefanie Schulte Strathaus, and Uli Ziemons)
- 2015: Libidinal Economies: Art in the Age of Bull Markets, UCI Gallery, University of California Irvine (curated by Juli Carson)
- 2015: Vienna for Art's Sake! / Archive Austria, Winterpalais, Vienna
- 2015: Now, at the latest, Kunsthalle, Krems
- 2016: Sensuous Discontent: Critical Aesthetics The First 10 Years film series, UCI Gallery, University of California Irvine (curated by Kelly Donahey and Ian Meares)
- 2016: Putting Rehearsals to the Test / It's not about models, it's about modelling, Leonard and Bina Ellen Gallery, Concordia University, Montreal
- 2016: FIAC Hors Les Murs, Paris
- 2017: ever elusive | thirty years of transmediale, Haus der Kulturen der Welt, Berlin
- 2017: Remastered -- Die Kunst der Aneignung, Kunsthalle, Krems (curated by Verena Gamper and Naoko Kaltschmidt)
- 2018: The Remains of Cinema, Künstlerhaus, Halle für Kunst and Medien, Graz (curated by Norbert Pfaffenbichler)
- 2018: Die 90er-Jahre | 3. Aufzug - Mobile Kunst im mobilen Markt, MUSA, Vienna
- 2019: When Gesture Becomes Event, Künstlerhaus, Vienna (curated by Felicitas Thun Hohenstein and Alenka Gregorič)
- 2020: Cybernetics of the Poor, Tabakalera International Centre for Contemporary Culture, Donostia/San Sebastián, Spain / Kunsthalle, Vienna
- 2021: Wake Words (lecture performance by and with Golden Pixel Cooperative), Kunstraum Niederösterreich, Vienna (curated by Enar de Dios Rodriguez, Olena Newkryta and Marlies Poeschl)
- 2023: On Stage -- Kunst als Bühne, mumok, Vienna (curated by Rainer Fuchs)
- 2024: I love you and leave you, Charim Galerie, Vienna
- 2024: Auf den Schultern von Riesinnen (On the Shoulders of Giantesses), Künstlerhaus Vienna (curated by Nina Schedlmayer)

=== Curatorial projects ===
- 1999: Hotel Utopia (film program), Summerstage Festival, Vienna
- 2001: Inextinguishable Fire / Traces of a Staging: Harun Farocki, Olaf Metzel, Wendelien van Oldenborgh, haus.0 program, Künstlerhaus, Stuttgart
- 2001: Economy of Desire (Isaac Julien film retrospective), Neue Galerie / Steirischer Herbst, Graz
- 2002: The Other Side: Missing Link, Wien 1970–1980, haus.0 program, Künstlerhaus, Stuttgart
- 2002: Wendelien van Oldenborgh / heaven's gift, MAK / CAT Contemporary Art Tower, Vienna
- 2003: Fate of Alien Modes, Secession, Vienna
- 2003: How We Got Into Pictures (Noël Burch film retrospective), ZKM, Karlsruhe, and haus.0 program, Künstlerhaus, Stuttgart
- 2003: Laura Cottingham: Not for Sale (Feminism and Art in the USA in the 1970s), Medienwerkstatt, Vienna
- 2004: Fate of Alien Modes (film program), ZKM, Karlsruhe
- 2006: Cinema Is Not A Bad School (presentation series as part of a lecture series), Merz Akademie, Stuttgart (co-curated with Elfi Mikesch, Christa Blümlinger, Babette Mangolte, Thomas Tode)
- 2008: Mimétisme (film program), Hebbel am Ufer (HAU), Berlin (exhibition curated by Anselm Franke)
- 2012: Keine Zeit (film program), 21er Haus, Vienna (exhibition curated by Bettina Steinbrügge)
- 2013: Positions in Experimental Films & Video: Familienfilme, University of the Arts, Berlin (co-curated with Christine Lang)
- 2013: Proben aufs Exempel (film and lecture series), mumok, Vienna (co-curated with Sabeth Buchmann)
- 2014: For the Birds (film program), Kunsthalle, Vienna
- 2015: You’ve Seen Me Before: Between Appropriation and Déjà-vu (projections and performances by students of the Art and Media class), Academy of Fine Arts, Vienna
- 2015: Blühendes Gift (collection exhibition), mumok, Vienna (co-curated with Diedrich Diederichsen and the students in the Master program in Critical Studies at the Academy of Fine Arts)
- 2016: Laura Mulvey: Feminismus und/im Kino, 1. mumok Kino, Vienna
- 2016: Putting Rehearsals to the Test / La répétition mise à l’épreuve, VOX, centre de l'image contemporaine / Leonard and Bina Ellen Gallery, Concordia University / SBC Gallery / Cinémathèque Québécoise, Montreal
- 2017: Erkennen und Verfolgen (a series of events on the work and teaching of Harun Farocki), Academy of Fine Arts, Vienna (co-curated with Michael Baute, Christa Blümlinger, Sezgin Boynik, Filipa César, Diedrich Diederichsen, Antje Ehmann, Thomas Elsaesser, Maren Grimm, Thomas Heise, Tom Holert, Jens Kastner, Christine Lang)
- 2017: Jene Tage (film and lecture series on Iran), topkino, Vienna (co-curated with the Golden Pixel Cooperative: Marlies Pöschl, Bernhard Staudinger, Lydia Nsiah)
- 2018: Casting a Shadow (film and lecture series), mumok and mumok Kino, Vienna (co-curated with Sabeth Buchmann)
- 2022: Raise and Unraise Your Voices! Choirs in Moving Images (three-part series), mumok Kino, Vienna (co-curated with Marietta Kesting)
- 2022: La Lotta Non È Ancora Finita (multi-part film program), Filmmuseum Vienna (co-curated with Annamaria Licciardello and Katharina Müller)

=== Film festival screenings ===
- 2007: X Love Scenes / Pearls without a String : Berlinale 2007 (premiere)
- 2010: Crash Site / My_Never_Ending_Burial_Plot: Berlinale, Forum; New Horizons Film Festival, Wrocław, Poland; Tel Aviv 5th Video Biennial, Tel Aviv
- 2013: Kalte Probe (Cold Rehearsal): Forum Expanded - Berlinale 2013 (premiere); Diagonale 2013, Graz
- 2015: Panoramis Paramount Paranormal: Diagonale 2015, Graz
- 2016: Panoramis Paramount Paranormal: FIDMarseille 2016
- 2020: Gli appunti di Anna Azzori / Uno specchio che viaggia nel tempo: Berlinale, Forum (world premiere); Diagonale, Graz; Jeonju International Film Festival, Jeonju, Korea; New Horizons Film Festival, Wrocław; FIDMarseille (International Competition); Festival Films Femmes Mediterranée, Marseille; She Makes Noise Festival, Madrid; Viennale; Mar del Plata International Film Festival, Mar del Plata, Argentina ; 44th Duisburger Filmwoche, Duisburg, Germany; Perugia Social Film Festival, Perugia; Essay Film Festival, London
- 2024: È a questo punto che nasce il bisogno di fare storia: FIDMarseille (world premiere); Pravo Ljudski Festival, Sarajevo; She Makes Noise, Madrid; Festival dei Popoli, Florence; Festival Efebo d'Oro, Palermo; Villa Medici Festival, Rome
- 2025: È a questo punto che nasce il bisogno di fare storia: DOK.fest, Munich; Diagonale, Graz; Image Ouverte, Paris; Pensa Festival, Barcelona; Exground Filmfest, Wiesbaden

=== Bibliography ===
==== As author ====
- Ruhm, Constanze (1993). True, false, else: give the self a shelf (in German). Graz: Neue Galerie am Landesmuseum Joanneum. OCLC 312981671.
- Meierhofer, Christine; Redl, Erwin; Ruhm, Constanze; Sandbichler, Peter; Sandbichler, Thomas (1996). Out of the dark. New York: Elga Wimmer. OCLC 49880056.
- Ruhm, Constanze; Sandbichler, Peter (1996). Knot projects: 1995-1996. Vienna: Publisher not identified. OCLC 49343110.
- Ruhm, Constanze (2002). "Spaces of Translation: Speaking one Language, Understanding Another -- A Conversation with Isaac Julien". Camera Austria international. No. 79. pp. 17–28.
- Ruhm, Constanze (2003). "Coming Attraction: X Characters (in search of an author)". In Shaw, Jeffrey; Weibel, Peter (eds.). Future cinema: the cinematic imaginary after film. Cambridge MA: MIT Press. p. 244. ISBN 978-0-262692861.
- Ruhm, Constanze (2004). Video Works From 1999-2004 (DVD). Vienna: Index. ISBN 978-1-350-91843-6.
- Ruhm, Constanze (2006). "(My/Theme) in Parenthesen". In Baute, Michael; Pantenburg, Volker (eds.). 93 Minutentexte: The night of the hunter (in German). Berlin: Brinkmann & Bose. pp. 185–190. ISBN 978-3-922660941.
- Ruhm, Constanze (1 October 2006). "X Characters: Shifting Identities". Cinéma & Cie. Film and Media Studies Journal. 6 (8).
- Ruhm, Constanze (September 2008). "Die Produktivität unsicherer Zeichen: Über Judith Barry im DA2 Domus Artium, Salamanca". Texte zur Kunst (in German) (71): 258–262.
- Ruhm, Constanze (2009). "La difficulté d'être (Renewal of Perspective)". In Buchmann, Sabeth; Husslein-Arco, Agnes (eds.). Empfindung: Oder in der Nähe der Fehler liegen die Wirkungen (in German). Vienna: Österreichische Galerie Belvedere. p. 69. ISBN 978-3-901508-61-5.
- Ruhm, Constanze; Ehlers, Ekkehard (2009). "blindstorey / Fitzwilliam Version, 2003–2009". In Rainer, Cosima; Rollig, Stella; Daniels, Dieter; Ammer, Manuela (eds.). See This Sound: Promises of Sound and Vision. Cologne: Walther König. p. 99. ISBN 978-3-86560-683-9.
- Buchmann, Sabeth; Ruhm, Constanze (2013). "Subject Put to the Test". Texte zur Kunst (90): 88–107.
- Ruhm, Constanze (2013). "Une femme est une femme -- Jean-Luc GODARD". In Busch, Annett; Gunkel, Henriette (eds.). Frieda Grafe -- 30 Filme: Heft 3. Berlin: Brinkmann & Bose. pp. 208–217. ISBN 978-3-940048189.
- Ruhm, Constanze (2013). "Replay: ANNA" (PDF). In Schulte Strathaus, Stefanie; Ziemons, Ulrich (eds.). Living archive: archive work as a contemporary artistic and curatorial practice. Berlin: b-books. pp. 150–159. ISBN 978-3-942214148.
- Ruhm, Constanze (13 February 2014). "Experimental Emulations in Breaking Bad, Mad Men and The Sopranos". Think:Film.
- Ruhm, Constanze (November 2014). Aranda, Julieta; Wood, Brian Kuan; Vidokle, Anton (eds.). "Attachment". e-flux (59).
- Buchmann, Sabeth; Ruhm, Constanze (2014). "Subject Put to the Test". In Thun-Hohenstein, Felicitas (ed.). Performing the Sentence: Research and Teaching in Performative Fine Arts. Berlin: Sternberg Press. pp. 200–207. ISBN 978-3-956790539.
- Ruhm, Constanze (2016). "Schlussel und Werke: The Key Works (Or It Doesn't)". In Diederichsen, Diedrich (ed.). Blühendes Gift: Zur feministischen Appropriation des österreichischen Unbewussten (in German). Cologne: Walther König. pp. 134–141. ISBN 978-3-902947-32-1.
- Ruhm, Constanze (2017). "'Yes, but...': Morgan Fisher's Alien Modes". In Antoine, Jean-Philippe; Blümlinger, Christa (eds.). Morgan Fisher: Off-Screen Cinema. Dijon: Les presses du réel. ISBN 978-2-84066-942-5.
- Ruhm, Constanze (2018). "TITEL, THESEN UND TALENTE oder auch ADRIANO oder auch YUPPI DU (kann mich nicht entscheiden)". In Audick, Janina (ed.). Talent (in German). Zürich: Patrick Frey. pp. 6–27. ISBN 978-3-906803708.
- Ruhm, Constanze (2018). "Mala Sirena: DD Geburtstagslied". In Buchmann, Sabeth; Kastner, Jens; Sonderegger, Ruth; Spiegl, Andreas (eds.). Die Stimme als Voice & Vote: Festschrift für Diedrich Diederichsen (in German). Berlin: b_books. pp. 6–27. ISBN 978-3-942214278.
- Armaly, Fareed; Ruhm, Constanze (2019). "On the haus.o program (1999-2002) im Künstlerhaus Stuttgart: Gespräch zwischen Fareed Armaly und Constanze Ruhm". In Paflik-Huber, Hannelore (ed.). Künstlerhaus Stuttgart: 40 Jahre 1978-2018 (in German). Stuttgart: avedition. pp. 372–387. ISBN 978-3-899862874.
- Ruhm, Constanze (2020). "Pearls Without a String". In Gregorič, Alenka; Thun-Hohenstein, Felicitas (eds.). When Gesture Becomes Event (PDF). Vienna: Künstlerhaus. pp. 16–21. ISBN 978-3-900354-67-1.
- Ruhm, Constanze (15 July 2020). "Ein Mann vor einem Bild". Texte zur Kunst (in German).
- Buchmann, Sabeth; Ruhm, Constanze (2021). "Casting A Shadow". In Huber, Leonie; Ludwig, Valerie; Zabric, Andrea (eds.). Big Critical Energy. Vienna: Schlebrügge. pp. 212–231. ISBN 978-3-903172739.
- Ruhm, Constanze (2021). "La Difficulté d'Une Perspective: A Life of Renewal". In Stracke, Caspar (ed.). Godard Boomerang: Artists on Godardian Conceptualism. Helsinki: Academy of Fine Arts. pp. 212–231. ISBN 978-9-523534056.
- Ruhm, Constanze (2 February 2021). "Was zu sehen gewesen sein wird: Screen Sharing". PROTOKULT DUISBURGER PROTOKOLLE (in German).
- Ruhm, Constanze (March 2022). "TATJANA TURANSKYJ (1966-2021)". Texte zur Kunst (in German) (125): 242.
- Ruhm, Constanze (2023). "An Archive of the Future, An Archive for the Past". In Schulte Strathaus, Stefanie; Hediger, Vinzenz (eds.). Accidental Archivism: Shaping Cinema's Futures with Remnants of the Past. Lüneburg, Germany: Meson Press. ISBN 978-3-95796-054-2.

==== As editor ====
- Ruhm, Constanze, ed. (2003). Fate of alien modes. Vienna: Secession. ISBN 978-3-901926549.
- Ruhm, Constanze; Diederichsen, Diedrich, eds. (2010). Immediacy and Non-Simultaneity: Utopia of Sound. Vienna: Schlebrügge. ISBN 978-3-851601732.
- Ruhm, Constanze; Buchmann, Sabeth; Lafer, Ilse, eds. (2016). Putting Rehearsals to the Test -- Practices of Rehearsal in Fine Arts, Film, Theater, Theory, and Politics. Berlin: Sternberg Press. ISBN 978-3-95679-211-3.

==== Analysis ====
- Huck, Brigitte (1998). "Constanze Ruhm: ...time and not the end of desire -- Museum moderner Kunst / 20er Haus, Wien". Camera Austria international (in German). No. 64.
- Schmatz, Ferdinand (1999). "Constanze Ruhm: Umgesetzte Gebung". Camera Austria international (in German). No. 66.
- Blümlinger, Christa (1999). "Constanze Ruhm: Das Trauma feststellen". Camera Austria international (in German). No. 66.
- Gsöllpointner, Katharina; Hentschläger, Ursula (1999). Paramour: Kunst im Kontext Neuer Technologien (in German). Vienna: Triton. ISBN 978-3-854860303.
- Huck, Brigitte (May–August 2002). "Screen Memories -- Constanze Ruhm". Parnass (in German). No. 2. pp. 104–109.
- Blümlinger, Christa (2005). "Visualisierung des filmischen Raums". In Koch, Gertrud (ed.). Umwidmungen : architektonische und kinematographische Räume (in German). Berlin: Vorwerk8. pp. 58–70. ISBN 978-3-930916702.
- Blümlinger, Christa (2009). "Visualisierung des filmischen Raums (Constanze Ruhm)". Kino aus zweiter Hand: zur Ästhetik materieller Aneignung im Film und in der Medienkunst (in German). Berlin: Vorwerk8. pp. 255–258. ISBN 978-3-940384096.
- Carson, Juli (June 2010). "Liebe Arbeit Kino, Galaxie der Signifikanten: Über "Crash Site/My_Never_Ending_Burial_Plot" von Constanze Ruhm". Texte zur Kunst (in German) (78): 166–169.
- Frank, Rike, ed. (2012). Constanze Ruhm: Coming Attractions (in German). Vienna: Schlebrügge. ISBN 978-3-902833-24-2.
- Scheyerer, Nicole (8 March 2013). "Proben für die perfekte Performance". Der Standard (in German).
- Blümlinger, Christa (Spring 2014). "Stratégies de virtualisation de l'image filmique: L'art archivistique (post)féministe de Constanze Ruhm". Intermédialités (in French) (23).
- Schantl, Alexandra, ed. (2015). Constanze Ruhm: Re: Rehearsals (No Such Thing as Repetition). Bielefeld: Kerber. ISBN 978-3-7356-0103-2.
- Hinrichsen, Jens (5 February 2015). "Wohin zur Berlinale?". Monopol (in German).
- Angeli, Cem (21 October 2015). "Constanze Ruhm - RE: REHEARSALS (NO SUCH THING AS REPETITION)". CastYourArt.
- Schwärzler, Dietmar (April 2016). "Constanze Ruhm -- Re: Rehearsals (No Such Thing As Repetition)". Springerin (in German). No. 2/2016. pp. 67–69.
- Stuckey, Lisa (2018). "Uncanny Fragment / Spectral Evidence: In Investigationen von Constanze Ruhm und Forensic Architecture". In Ballhausen, Thomas; Huez, Robert (eds.). Der Zeitungsausschnitt: Begleitbuch zur Ringvorlesung (in German). Vienna: danzig & unfried. pp. 123–140. ISBN 978-3-902752437.
- Benzer, Christa (2020). "Der Film als Bühne für ... Performative Strategien in ausgewählten Videos und Filmen: Constanze Ruhm, Carola Dertnig, Annja Krautgasser, Michaela Schwentner und Miriam Bajtalar". In Reicher, Isabella (ed.). Eine eigene Geschichte: Frauen Film Österreich seit 1999 (in German). Vienna: Sonderzahl. pp. 262–269. ISBN 978-3-854495505.
- Nord, Cristina (2020). "The Charm of Fog". Berlinale.
- Blümlinger, Christa (Fall 2020). "Un voyage féministe: Les 'appunti' de Constanze Ruhm". Trafic (in French). No. 115. pp. 37–40. ISBN 978-2-818051283.
- Wurmitzer, Michael (21 December 2020). "'When Gesture Becomes Event' im Künstlerhaus: Gemeinsam bestäuben". der Standard (in German).
- Stuckey, Lisa (2022). Forensische Verfahren in den zeitgenössischen Künsten: Forensic Architecture und andere Fallanalysen (in German). Berlin: De Gruyter. ISBN 978-3-11-073772-1.
- Watzenboeck, Susanne (2022). "L'unico movimento è il ritorno: Constanze Ruhms 'La strada (è ancora) più lunga'". In Laussegger, Armin; Sam, Sandra (eds.). Tätigkeitsbericht 2021 der Landessammlungen Niederösterreich und des Zentrums für Museale Sammlungswissenschaften (in German). St. Pölten: Landessammlungen Niederösterreich. pp. 112–115. ISBN 978-3-903436-01-5.
- Rollig, Stella; Slanar, Claudia, eds. (2023). Constanze Ruhm: Come una pupilla al variare della luce. Cologne: Walther und Franz König. ISBN 978-3-7533-0446-5.
- Scheyerer, Nicole (21 June 2023). "Der zerbrochene Spiegel: Besuch in der römischen casa delle Donne". Falter (in German). No. 25/2023.
- Beeston, Alix; Solomon, Stefan (23 March 2025). "The Multiplying Pathways of the Feminist Incomplete". UC Press Blog.

==== Reviews ====
- Huck, Brigitte (1998). "Wien: Herbstlicher Ausstellungsrundgang". Eikon (in German). No. 26/27. pp. 111–114.
- Aigner, Claudia (18 January 2000). "Quer durch Galerien: Eine Staubmilben-Psychose?". Wiener Zeitung (in German).
- Medina, Cuauhtémoc (13 December 2000). "El Ojo Breve: Recorridos por el espacio indefinible del presente". Reforma (in Spanish). p. 4c.
- Metzger, Rainer (23 January 2001). "Gruppenschau als Interferenzzone". www.artmagazine.cc (in German).
- Probst, Ursula Maria (23 November 2001). "Was geschah mit Laura Mars?". www.artmagazine.cc (in German).
- Krumpl, Doris (26 November 2001). "Beziehungsreich: Constanze Ruhm bei Engholm". Der Standard online (in German).
- Hoffmann, Gabriele (4 December 2001). "In der Schußlinie". taz (in German).
- Dusini, Matthias (12 December 2001). "Unsichtbare Gegner". Falter (in German). No. 50/2001. p. 76.
- Tietjen, Friedrich (January–February 2002). "Vienna: Constanze Ruhm, Kerstin Engholm". Flash Art. No. 222. p. 100. OCLC 192975934.
- Aigner, Claudia (4 January 2002). "Quer durch Galerien: Die Spezies namens Nachbar". Wiener Zeitung (in German).
- Hall, Michael (March–April 2002). "Reviews: Constanze Ruhm, Kerstin Engholm Galerie, Vienna". Tema Celeste. No. 90. p. 95.
- "Uncommon Denominator: New Art from Vienna". absolutearts.com. 24 May 2002.
- Jansen, Gregor (January 2003). "1997 -- Scream and Scream and Scream again". Springerin.
- Rebhandl, Bert (15 February 2003). "berlin biennale: Parallelaktion zum Alltagsbetrieb". der Standard (in German).
- "Brüllender Löwe, Loch in der Wand". Die Presse (in German). 10 May 2003.
- Aigner, Claudia (13 April 2010). "Galerien: Begrabt ihn tiefer!". Wiener Zeitung (in German).
- Power, Nina (August 2010). "Immediacy and Non-Simultaneity: Utopia of Sound". The Wire. No. 318. p. 82.
- Higashino, Yuki (Spring 2013). "Rike Frank (Hg.), Constanze Ruhm -- Coming Attractions". Springerin (in German). No. 2/2013. p. 72.
- Benzer, Christa (5 December 2014). "Prolog ohne Anfang und Ende". der Standard (in German).
- Weh, Vitus (20 February 2015). "Constanze Ruhm / Emilien Awada -- Kerstin Engholm Galerie, Vienna". Frieze.
- Higashino, Yuki (5 November 2015). "Zeit Kunst Niederösterreich | Museum of Lower Austria | Kulturbezirk 5, September 26, 2015 -- January 24, 2016". artforum.
- Schedlmayer, Nina (30 November 2015). "Constanze Ruhm -- RE: REHEARSALS (no such thing as repetition): Geisterbahn mit Campingstuhl". www.artmagazine.cc (in German).
- Gerold, Roman (17 December 2015). "Constanze Ruhm: Leg doch mal das Handbuch weg". der Standard (in German).
- Borchhardt-Birbaumer, Brigitte (30 December 2015). "Immer das falsche Kleid an". Wiener Zeitung (in German).
- Higashino, Yuki (Summer 2017). "Sabeth Buchmann, Ilse Lafer, Constanze Ruhm (Eds.) -- Putting Rehearsals to the Test: Practices of Rehearsal in Fine Arts, Film, Theater, Theory, and Politics". Springerin (in German). No. 3/2017. p. 72.
- Ekardt, Philipp (June 2017). "Probing Attitudes: Philipp Ekardt on 'Putting Rehearsals to the Test (eds. Buchmann, Lafer, Ruhm)'". Texte zur Kunst (106).
- Dubé-Moreau, Florence-Agathe; Johnson, Maude (Winter 2017). "La repetition mise a l'epreuve". Esse (in French). No. 89. pp. 92–94.
- Rich, B. Ruby (2020). "After Optimism: For The Forum at Fifty". Arsenal -- Institut für Film und Videokunst e.V.
- Lumholdt, Jan (25 February 2020). "Review: The Notes of Anna Azzori/A Mirror that Travels through Time". cineuropa.
- Pavido, Marina (29 February 2020). "GLI APPUNTI DI ANNA AZZORI -- UNO SPECCHIO CHE VIAGGIA NEL TEMPO". Cinema Austriaco.
- Grissemann, Stefan (29 February 2020). "Berlinale-Tagebuch (III): Provokation und Alltag". profil.at (in German).
- Kamalzadeh, Dominik (29 February 2020). "Berlinale unter neuer Leitung: Der Kurswechsel ist geglückt". der Standard (in German).
- Tsui, Clarence (18 March 2020). "The Projector | A filmmaker remakes a classic documentary about a homeless woman –- without the male bias". South China Morning Post. Archived from the original on 6 May 2020.
- Padovani, Elise (24 July 2020). "Critiques -- FIDMarseille 2020: un très beau film féministe, Gli appunti di Anna Azzori, en compétition internationale". Zibeline (in French).
- Raganelli, Giampiero (24 July 2020). "The Notes of Anna Azzori / A Mirror that Travels through Time". Quinlan (in Italian).
- Blümlinger, Christa (7 August 2020). "FEMINISTISCHE REISE: Christa Blümlinger über 'Gli appunti di Anna Azzori/Uno specchio che viaggia nel tempo' von Constanze Ruhm". Texte zur Kunst (in German).
- Schluge, Caroline (20 March 2023). "Feministische Laufbildkunst: Constanze Ruhm im Belvedere 21". Parnass (in German).
- Dirk, Valerie (28 April 2023). "Constanze Ruhm führt ins Spiegelkabinett des Feminismus". der Standard (in German).
- Winkler, Sabine (June 2023). "Constanze Ruhm: Come una pupilla al variare della luce". Eikon (in German). No. 122.
- Stuckey, Lisa (29 September 2023). "'TRANSFORM THE QUALITIES OF OBJECT/SCENES BY BREAKING THEM' on Constanze Ruhm at Belvedere 21, Vienna". Texte zur Kunst.
- "Neue Künstlerhaus-Schau: "Auf den Schultern von Riesinnen"". Salzburger Nachrichten (in German). 7 March 2024.
- Pavido, Marina (27 June 2024). "È a questo punto che nasce il bisogno di fare storia". Cinema Austriaco.
- Goldkind, Zachary (10 July 2024). "It is at this point that the need to write history arises -- Constanze Ruhm [FIDMarseille '24 Review]". In Review Online.
- Colla, Elisabetta (5 November 2024). "Festival dei popoli -- 'È a questo punto che nasce il bisogno di fare storia': dialogando tra femminismi vecchi e nuovi". Taxidrivers (in Italian).
- Meadows, Queline; Webb, Will; Harris, Cydnii Wilde (18 December 2024). "The best video essays of 2024". Sight and Sound.

==== Interviews ====
- Lübbke, Maren (1999). "Constanze Ruhm: The Logic of the Obliterated Moment". Camera Austria international. No. 66.
- Hasenlechner, Anja (2001). "Constanze Ruhm". Vorbilder & Nachbilder: Positionen österreichische Künstlerinnen zu neuen Medien (in German). Vienna: Triton. pp. 133–134. ISBN 978-3-901310874.
- Tjaben, Christian (January–February 2004). "siebenfrauen". Style and the Family Tunes (in German). No. 67.
- Morsch, Thomas (October 2008). "'It's Not TV!' Ein Gespräch zwischen Diedrich Diederichsen, Christoph Dreher und Constanze Ruhm". kolik.film (in German). No. 10.
- Beckstette, Sven (December 2010). "Wenn Kunst auf Politik trifft". Texte zur Kunst (in German) (80): 104–111.
- Liska, Sylvie, ed. (2011). "2000: Doug Aitken, with Constanze Ruhm". The Secession Talks: Exhibitions in Conversation 1998-2010. Cologne: Walther König. pp. 164–173. ISBN 978-3-863350925.
- Liska, Sylvie, ed. (2011b). "2003: Constanze Ruhm, with Nomeda and Gediminas Urbonas". The Secession Talks: Exhibitions in Conversation 1998-2010. Cologne: Walther König. pp. 302–311. ISBN 978-3-863350925.
- Hassenfratz, Celestine (27 February 2020). "Constanze Ruhm über die Ausbeutung einer jungen Frau und den Film als feministisches Manifest: 'Wir haben keine Angst'". Neues Deutschland (in German).
- "Künstler im Lockdown: Was tun, Ina Loitzl?". der Standard (in German). 17 May 2021.
- Hösl, Leon (27 May 2022). "Constanze Ruhm: Immer Weiter Proben". PW–Magazine (in German).

==== Exhibition catalogs ====
- Ascott, Roy; Wiener, Zelko (1987). Cultura Digitalis. Vienna: Academy of Applied Arts. OCLC 502143455.
- Fleck, Robert, ed. (1992). Peter Weibel: On Justifying the Hypothetical Nature of Art and the Non-Identicality Within the Object World. Cologne: Walther König. ISBN 978-3-8837-5166-5.
- Gerbel, Karl; Weibel, Peter, eds. (1994). "Secret of Life: Constanze Ruhm / Peter Sandbichler". intelligent environment. Vienna: PVS Verleger. ISBN 978-3-901196119.
- Schellerer-Kos, Désirée, ed. (1994). "Constanze Ruhm". Translucent Writings. Purchase, NY: Neuberger Museum of Art, State University of New York. pp. 68–69. OCLC 501335470.
- Weibel, Peter, ed. (1994). Lokalzeit -- Wiener Material im Spiegel des Unbehagens (in German). Vienna: Raum Strohal. ISBN 978-3-901456008.
- Fuchs, Rainer, ed. (1995). "Illustrations". "Self construction": Museum moderner Kunst Stiftung Ludwig, 20er Haus, Vienna, 24.11.1995-25.2.1996. Klagenfurt: Ritter. pp. 121–149. ISBN 978-3-854151838.
- Faber, Monika; Huck, Brigitte, eds. (1995). "Constanze Ruhm". Auf den Leib geschrieben (in German). Vienna: Kunsthalle Wien. pp. 113–120. ISBN 978-3-852470061.
- Weibel, Peter, ed. (1995). The Media Pavilion: Art and Architecture in the Age of Cyberspace. New York: Springer. ISBN 978-3-211-82722-2.
- Scharf, Andreas, ed. (1996). "Constanze Ruhm: Niederösterreichisches Landesmuseum". Balance.Akte 96 / Bd. 2 (in German). Vienna: Amt der Niederösterreichische Landesregierung. pp. 46–47. ISBN 978-3-854601739.
- Sandner, Oscar, ed. (1996). Rom suchen -- Artisti austriaci a Roma 1964-1996 (in German and Italian). Vienna: Folio. ISBN 978-3-852560472.
- Corà, Bruno; Pistoletto, Michelangelo, eds. (1996). Habitus, Abito, Abitare (in Italian). Milan: Skira. ISBN 978-8-881181155.
- Gloggengiesser, Christine, ed. (1996). Co właściwie sprawia, że dzisiejsze miasta są tak odmienne, tak seksy? / Just what is it, that makes today's cities so different, so sexy? (in Polish). Vienna: Bösmüller.
- Haaser, Sophie, ed. (1998). Constanze Ruhm, ...time and not the end of desire: eine Projektion im Kinosaal, 20er Haus ; Museum Moderner Kunst Stiftung Ludwig Wien, 20er Haus, 12.9.98 bis 1.11.98. Vienna: Museum moderner Kunst Stiftung Ludwig. ISBN 978-3-900776-76-3.
- Schrage, Dieter, ed. (1998). Positionen -- Hedendaagse Oostenrijkse Kunst (in Dutch). Knokke-Heist (Belgium): Cultureel Centrum. OCLC 1513649816.
- Großmann, Willi, ed. (1998). "CONSTANZE RUHM: Recent Works". Transmediale 98 11. VideoFest: Bestandsaufnahme Sehen: video, television, multimedia. Berlin: Berliner Kulturveranstungs-GmbH. p. 37. OCLC 255938015.
- Rollig, Stella (1999). "Künstlerinnen: Positionen der Gegenwartskunst". In Brugger, Ingried (ed.). Das Jahrhundert der Frauen: vom Impressionismus zur Gegenwart, Österreich 1870 bis heute (in German). Vienna: Kunstforum. pp. 265–277. ISBN 978-3-701712045.
- Abrell, Herbert, ed. (2000). "Constanze Ruhm". LKW Lebenskunstwerke -- Kunst in der Stadt 4 (in German). Cologne: Walther König. p. 196. ISBN 978-3-883754444.
- Coronabless, Notburga (2000). New Austrian Spotlight: Österreichische Kunst aus der Sammlung der Artothek des Bundes (in German). Vienna: Bundeskanzleramt Kunstsektion Artothek. OCLC 863635536.
- Weibel, Peter, ed. (2001). "Constanze Ruhm: True / False / Else; Un coup de dés". Im Buchstabenfeld: die Zukunft der Literatur (in German). Graz: Droschl. pp. 319–344. ISBN 978-3-854206002.
- Rehm, Jean-Pierre (2001). "Endtroducing (Or, the Invention of the Cinema Within the Scope of the Exhibition)". In Gateau, Laurence (ed.). Action, we're filming. Paris: Réunion des musées nationaux. pp. 169–180. ISBN 978-2-711843145.
- Brichs, Victòria Izquierdo, ed. (2002). Límits de la percepció. Barcelona: Fundació Joan Miró. ISBN 978-8-493215941.
- Heon, Laura Steward, ed. (2002). Uncommon Denominator: New Art from Vienna. North Adams MA: MASS MoCA. ISBN 978-0-970073853.
- CHOI, Taeman; LEE, Sunghuhn; PARK, Manu, eds. (2004). Busan Biennale Catalogue. Busan: Busan Biennale Organizing Committee. OCLC 469356647.
- Wagner, Renate (2004). "constanze ruhm". In Bauer, Ute Meta (ed.). Exhibition Catalogue, 3rd Berlin Biennale for Contemporary Art. Cologne: Oktagon. p. 107. ISBN 978-3-883757896.
- Weibel, Peter, ed. (2005). "Constanze Ruhm". Beyond Art. Vienna: Springer. p. 501. ISBN 978-3-211-24562-0.
- Gehrmann, Lucas; Matt, Gerald, eds. (2005). "Constanze Ruhm". Living and working in Vienna II: 25 positions in contemporary art. Vienna: Kunsthalle Wien. pp. 160–163. ISBN 978-3-852470573.
- Fiedler, Elisabeth; Steinle, Christa; Weibel, Peter, eds. (2005). "Constanze Ruhm". The Postmedia Condition. Graz: Neue Galerie am Landesmuseum Joanneum. p. 74. ISBN 978-3-902241146.
- Husslein-Arco, Agnes, ed. (2005). Simultaneous: Two Collections of Austrian Photography from the Collections of the Federal Chancellery and the Museum der Moderne. Vienna: Christian Brandstätter. ISBN 978-3-902510204.
- Huck, Brigitte, ed. (2005). "Constanze Ruhm". EVN Sammlung 95-05. Cologne: Walther König. pp. 274–275. ISBN 978-3-883759708. (catalog for the Nach Rokytnik exhibition)
- Artaker, Anna (2006). "Constanze Ruhm". In Hochdörfer, Achim (ed.). Why pictures now -- Fotografie, Film, Video heute. Nuremberg: Verlag für Moderne Kunst. pp. 152–153. ISBN 978-3-902490193.
- Ehmann, Antje; Farocki, Harun, eds. (2006). Cinema like never before. Cologne: Walther König. ISBN 978-3-901107481.
- Krejci, Harald; Husslein-Arco, Agnes; Steinbrügge, Bettina, eds. (2012). "Marc Adrian, Tom Burr, VALIE EXPORT, Peter Friedl, Liam Gillick, Franz Graf, Christian Jankowski, Paul McCarthy, Jonathan Meese, Seb Patane, Constanze Ruhm, Markus Schinwald, Gregor Schneider, SUPERFLEX, Franz West, Fritz Wotruba". Utopia Gesamtkunstwerk. Cologne: Walther König. pp. 140–173. ISBN 978-3-863351403.
- Bauer, Ute Meta; Rujoiu, Anca, eds. (2014). "Constanze Ruhm, X CHARACTERS / RE[HERS]AL". Theatrical fields: Critical strategies in Performance, Film and Video. Singapore: NTU Centre of Contemporary Art. pp. XL–XLI. ISBN 978-9-811103629.
- Maier-Rieper, Heike, ed. (2015). "Constanze Ruhm". 95-2015 Jubilee: evn collection. Vienna: Verlag für Moderne Kunst. p. 314. ISBN 978-3903004528.
- Steininger, Florian; Gamper, Verena, eds. (2017). "Constanze Ruhm". Remastered: The Art of Appropriation. Cologne: Walther König. pp. 184–185. ISBN 978-3-960982524.
- Diederichsen, Diedrich; Etxeberria, Oier, eds. (2020). "Constanze Ruhm". Cybernetics of the Poor. Berlin: Sternberg Press. p. 159. ISBN 978-3-956795930.

== Awards ==
- 1993: Austrian State Scholarship for Fine Arts
- 1993: Prix Ars Electronica Recognition for Computer Graphics
- 1996: Recognition Award for Media Art of the State of Lower Austria
- 2000: Women's Media Art Prize of the Minister for Women, Ministry of Culture, Vienna
- 2002: Wilfried Skreiner Prize of the State of Styria
- 2004: City of Vienna Prize for Fine Arts
- 2009: Lower Austrian Cultural Prize for Media Art
- 2009: Austrian Art Prize for Fine Arts
- 2020: Diagonale Prize for Innovative Cinema for Gli appunti di Anna Azzori / Uno specchio che viaggia nel tempo
- 2021: Outstanding Artist Award for Film in the category Feature Film and Documentary Film of the Austrian Ministry of the Arts, Culture, Civil Service and Sport

== Works cited ==
- Rollig, Stella (2023). "Foreword". In Rollig, Stella; Slanar, Claudia (eds.). Constanze Ruhm: Come una pupilla al variare della luce. Cologne: Walther und Franz König. ISBN 978-3-7533-0446-5.
- Ruhm, Constanze (2015). "Cold Rehearsal, 2013". In Schantl, Alexandra (ed.). Constanze Ruhm: Re: Rehearsals (No Such Thing as Repetition). Bielefeld / Berlin: Kerber Verlag. ISBN 978-3-7356-0103-2.
- Schantl, Alexandra (2015). "'My work is a process of continuous adaptation': Constanze Ruhm in conversation with Alexandra Schantl, June 2015". Constanze Ruhm: Re: Rehearsals (No Such Thing as Repetition).
- Schantl, Alexandra, ed. (2015b). "Biography, Exhibitions, Film Festivals, Bibliography, Filmography". Constanze Ruhm: Re: Rehearsals (No Such Thing as Repetition).
- Schulte Strathaus, Stefanie (2015). "Living Archives, Boundary Dissolutions in Cinema, and Other Elective Affinities". In Schantl, Alexandra (ed.). Constanze Ruhm: Re: Rehearsals (No Such Thing as Repetition).
- Stuckey, Lisa (2022). Forensische Verfahren in den zeitgenössischen Künsten: Forensic Architecture und andere Fallanalysen. Berlin / Boston: de Gruyter. ISBN 978-3-11-073772-1.
- Tsui, Clarence (18 March 2020). "The Projector | A filmmaker remakes a classic documentary about a homeless woman –- without the male bias". South China Morning Post. Archived from the original on 6 May 2020.
