= A Low Life Mythology =

- Film poster
- Directed by: Lior Shamriz
- Written by: Lior Shamriz and the cast
- Produced by: Lior Shamriz
- Starring: Nina Fog; Johannes Hendrik Langer; Imri Kahn; Lucas Confurius; Katja Sallay; Hito Steyerl; Wolfgang Müller
- Cinematography: Marco Armborst
- Music by: Assaf Gidron
- Distributed by: spektakulativ
- Release date: 19 April 2012 (Achtung Berlin)
- Running time: 80 minutes
- Country: Germany
- Language: English
- Budget: $50,000

A Low Life Mythology is a 2012 film directed by Lior Shamriz and starring Nina Fog and Johannes Hendrik Langer. It was written by the director with some improvisations by the cast and includes guest appearances by artists Hito Steyerl, Wolfgang Müller and others. The film premiered at the 2012 Achtung Berlin Film Festival.

== Plot ==
Mana Avaris is a foreign art student from an obscure country who lives in Berlin, Germany. According to her own testimony in the film, she is attending the school solely for the purpose of obtaining a visa. At a house party in Kreuzberg, Mana runs into Asten, a young dreamy man. The story of their relationship unfolds throughout the film.

Within the film are the art works supposedly made by Mana, Asten and their social circle. They are mostly essay films but some were materialized as real performances to an unsuspecting audience, such as the full-nudity monologue by Shirley Rosenthal which was recorded live at the Barbie Deinhoff queer bar, a known establishment in Berlin.

The film deals with an imaginary world based in narrative deconstruction, in the deformation and experimentation of the figure, in the image that overflows its materiality to break down, revive and divide itself. Many historical references dealing with foreignness and multiculturalism appear in the film, in characters' names (Avaris being the capital of the Hyksos in Egypt) and the films the characters present each other, such as Nabonidus and Cyrus and the destruction of the Library of Alexandria. The writing credits were attributed to Pierre Menard, a fictional character from a short story by Jorge Luis Borges

== Cast ==
Actor	Role
Nina Fog	Mana Avaris
Johannes Hendrik Langer	Asten Büchner
Kirsten Burger	Justine Heidelberg
Hito Steyerl	Mana's mother
Imri Kahn	Xenakiss Paul
Katja Sallay	Xandra Mantra
Chloe Griffin	Musician Friend
Patrizia Cavalliere	Shirley Rosenthal

== Production ==
The film was produced with a grant by Medienboard Berlin-Brandenburg and the French art foundation Bambi. It showed at the Thessaloniki International Film Festival as part of a retrospective for the director and was later nominated to the Prize of the German National Gallery for young Film Art.

== See also ==
- Lior Shamriz filmography
