= Charlie (2007 film) =

- Directed by: Salvatore Interlandi
- Written by: Salvatore Interlandi
- Starring: D.J. Mendel; Denise Greber; Timothy Donovan Jr. Britt Genelin; Ewa da Cruz; Kourtney Rutherford; Robert Cucuzza; Margaret Rose Champagne
- Cinematography: Daniel Sharnoff
- Release date: 2007
- Running time: 88 minutes
- Country: United States
- Language: English

Charlie is a 2007 American film starring D.J. Mendel and is the directorial debut film of writer-director Salvatore Interlandi.

Film critic Aaron Hillis described Interlandi as being under the influence of director John Cassavetes during the filming Charlie.

== Plot ==
Charlie, a working class stiff, who suspects his wife has been cheating on him, goes on a drunken rampage throughout New York City in hopes of finding his wife's lover.

== Critical reception ==
The Village Voice, "As a story, Charlie is slight, but as an experimental character study, it's a rich and moving tangle of emotional schizophrenia."

New York Post, "All in all, a lot of talented people are showcased on both sides of the camera in "Charlie." It's enough to renew your faith in the future of cinema."

The New York Times, "“Charlie” has too much maudlin emoting, too many raggedy or redundant scenes... But it also has guts and soul, and a keen appreciation of grown-up pain — qualities sorely lacking in American independent film today."
