= Saturn return (disambiguation) =

Saturn return is an astrological phenomenon based on the movement of the planet Saturn, reflecting the age of achieving full adulthood. Saturn return, Saturn returns, or Saturn's return or variants may also refer to:

== Film ==
- Saturn Returns, a 2001 telemovie with screenplay by Christos Tsiolkas
- Saturn Returns (film), a 2009 German/Israeli film by Lior Shamriz
- Saturn Return (2024 film), a Spanish/French film by Isaki Lacuesta and Pol Rodríguez
- Saturn Return (2026 film), an upcoming romantic drama film

== Music ==
- Myths and Hymns, a 1998 song cycle and musical originally known as Saturn Returns
- Saturn Return (The Secret Sisters album), (2020)
- Saturn Return (Rêve album) (2023)
- Saturnz Return, a 1998 album by Goldie
- "Saturn Return", a song by Eraserheads from Aloha Milkyway (1998)
- "Saturn Return", a song by R.E.M. from Reveal (2001)
- "Saturn Returns Interlude", a song by Ariana Grande from Eternal Sunshine (2024)

== Plays ==
- Saturn Returns (play), an American play by Noah Haidle first staged in New York in 2008
- Saturn's Return, an Australian play by Tommy Murphy, first staged in Sydney in 2008

== Other uses ==
- Saturn Return (manga), Japanese manga series written and illustrated by Akane Toriaki since 2019
- Saturn's Return to New York, a 2001 novel by Sara Gran

== See also ==
- Saturn (disambiguation)
- Return of Saturn, 2000 album by No Doubt
