= The Garden of Earthly Delights (2004 film) =

2004 Polish film

- Directed by: Lech Majewski
- Written by: Lech Majewski
- Produced by: Guido Cerasuolo
- Starring: Claudine Spiter; Chris Nightingale
- Distributed by: Gutek Film
- Release date: March 12, 2004 (Poland)
- Running time: 103 minutes
- Language: English

The Garden of Earthly Delights (Ogród rozkoszy ziemskich) is a 2004 film by the Polish director Lech Majewski. It follows two lovers as they roam Venice, Italy.

== Plot ==
Claudine is a British art scholar who has a terminal case of throat cancer. She is in Venice to give a lecture on the Bosch triptych from which the film gets its name.

Claudine is accompanied in Venice by her lover, Chris, a nautical engineer. Together they explore the canals of Venice. Chris has brought his video camera, and the audience watches Claudine and Chris hang out, make love, swim, converse, rent an apartment, and recreate vignettes from the triptych.

== Cast ==
- Claudine Spiteri as Claudine
- Chris Nightingale as Chris
- Barry Chipperfield as National Gallery Warder
- Maria Novella Martinoli as Real Estate Agent
- Gian Campi as Professor Carrini
- Mariosa Marchiori as Woman in Black
- Lucrezia Unterholzner as Child

== Evaluation ==
Ágnes Pethő suggests that the tableau vivant performances by the lovers to recreate images from the Bosch artwork break down the differences between and to celebrate art and life.
