= My America (film) =

- Directed by: Hal Hartley
- Written by: Neil Labute; Greg Allen; Bekah Brunstetter; Kia Corthron
- Produced by: Hal Hartley
- Starring: Gia Crovatin; Cody Nickell; Femi Lawal; David Ross; D.J. Mendel; Thomas Jay Ryan
- Release date: 2014
- Country: United States
- Language: English

My America is a 2014 documentary film directed by Hal Hartley.

== Overview ==
Twenty-one monologues written by American playwrights that form a fractured portrait of the American psyche.

== Critical reception ==
The Hollywood Reporter, "Few episodes offer much in the way of flag-waving optimism, but even the darker scenes tend to be more fascinated by the challenges Americans face than despairing about them."

Paste, "While My America is too short to possibly encapsulate contemporary American life and attitudes, it comes close enough within its sub eighty minute running time that it’s easy to self-identify with the ideas it espouses on one level or another."

The A.V. Club, "What emerges is a cross-section view of the American stage, with 21 playwrights (Neil LaBute is the biggest name here) each getting a few minutes of screen time. Hartley, whose work has often flirted with theatrical conventions, serves as a perfect channel, conveying strengths and weaknesses alike."
