= Lech Majewski =

Polish film and theater director

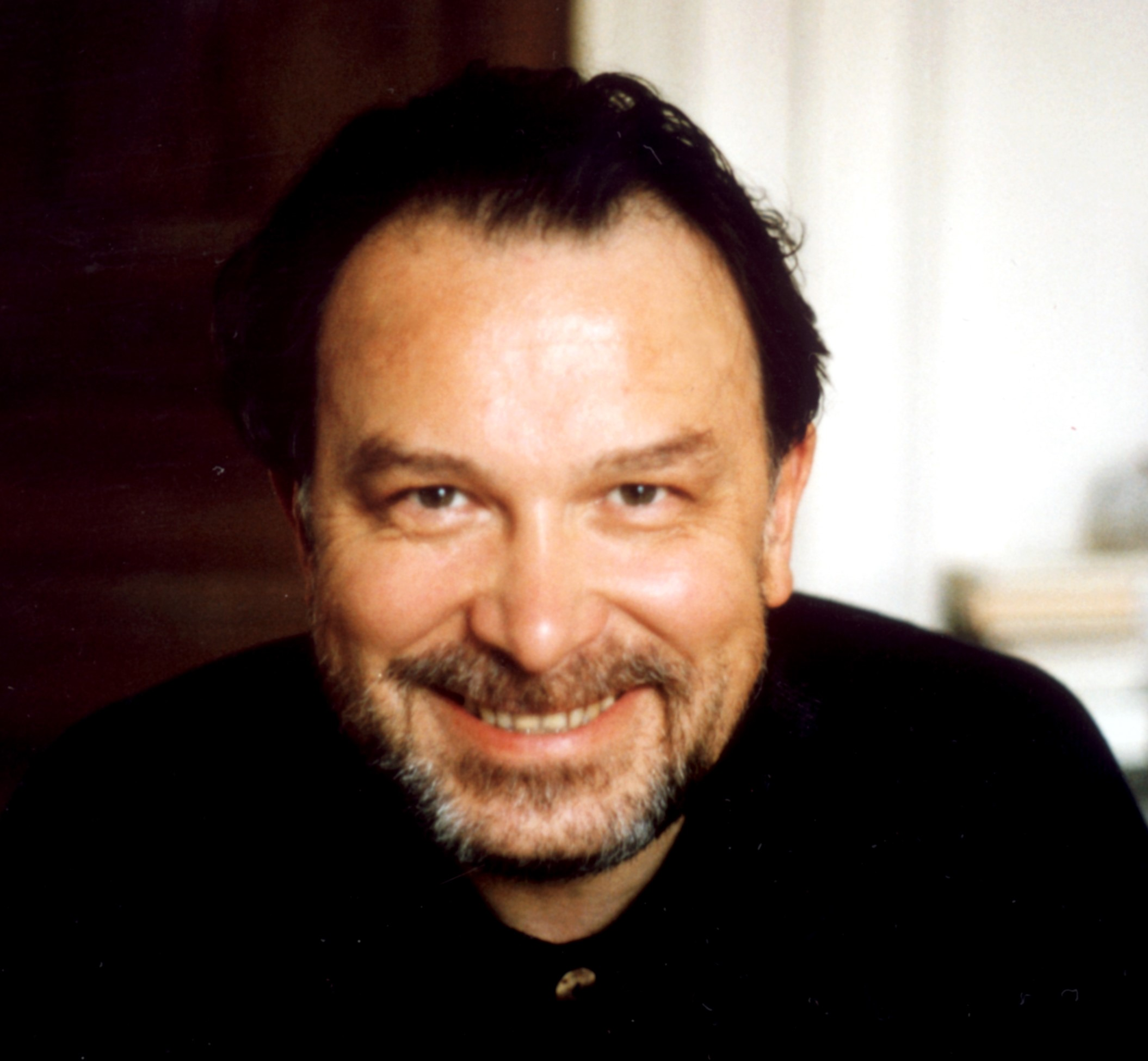
- Born: August 30, 1953 (age 73); Stalinogród, Polish People's Republic
- Education: Łódź Film School
- Website: lechmajewski.com

Lech Majewski (pronounced [maˈjɛfski], ‘Ma-yev-ski’) (born 30 August 1953) is a Polish-American poet, filmmaker, media artist, writer, and theater director. He is a member of the Directors Guild of America and the Academy of Motion Picture Arts and Sciences.

== Biography ==
Lech Majewski was born in Katowice, Poland.

His experimental film Wojaczek (1999) received over 20 international awards and was called by The New York Times a "virtuoso achievement." In 2000, Majewski released Angelus.

== Museum exhibitions and video art ==
Majewski’s works have been exhibited at the Museum of Modern Art (MoMA) in New York, the Louvre, and the Venice Biennale. In 2006, MoMA hosted a retrospective titled Lech Majewski: Conjuring the Moving Image.

His video art series Blood of a Poet premiered at MoMA in 2006 and became part of the 52nd Venice Biennale. The work was later reassembled into the film Glass Lips (2007), praised by The New York Times for its "hypnotic expressiveness."

== Later works ==
Majewski’s 2011 film The Mill and the Cross, starring Rutger Hauer, Charlotte Rampling, and Michael York, was based on Pieter Bruegel’s painting The Way to Calvary and received critical acclaim at the Sundance Film Festival. Roger Ebert described it as a "film of great beauty and attention before which words fall silent."

His subsequent works include Onirica / Field of Dogs (2014), a contemporary adaptation of Dante’s Divine Comedy, and Valley of the Gods (2019), featuring John Malkovich and Josh Hartnett.

== Filmography ==
- The Annunciation (Zwiastowanie) (1978) writer/director
- The Knight (Rycerz) (1980) writer/director
- The Flight of the Spruce Goose (Lot Świerkowej Gęsi) (1986) writer/director/producer
- Prisoner of Rio (Więzień Rio) (1988), produced between England and Brazil, a fictionalized story of Ronnie Biggs, mastermind of The Great Train Robbery of 1963 writer/director/producer
- The Gospel According to Harry (Ewangelia według Harry'ego) (1992) writer/director/producer
- Basquiat (developed project, eventually credited as co-writer and co-producer) (1996) writer/producer
- The Roe's Room (Pokój Saren) (1998) writer/director/producer/composer/set designer
- Accident (Wypadek) (1998) writer/director/producer
- Wojaczek (aka Life Hurts) (1999) writer/director/editor
- Angelus (2001) writer/director/set designer/composer/editor
- The Garden of Earthly Delights (2004) writer/director/producer/composer
- Glass Lips (2007) (feature film version of the Blood of a Poet installation (2006)) writer/director/producer/cinematographer/ editor/composer
- The Mill and the Cross (2011) writer/director/producer/cinematographer/set designer/editor/composer
- Field of Dogs / Onirica (2014) writer/director/producer/cinematographer/set designer/editor/composer
- Valley of the Gods (2019) writer/director/producer/cinematographer/set designer/editor/composer
- Brigitte Bardot Forever (Brigitte Bardot cudowna) (2021) writer/director/producer/cinematographer/set designer/editor/composer

== Opera ==
- Ubu Rex (1995) director
- Carmen (1995) director/producer
- Pokój Saren (1996) composer/librettist/director/producer/set designer/choreographer
- Carmen (2002) director/producer
- Harnasie / King Roger (2008) director/set designer
