= Glass Lips =

- Directed by: Lech Majewski
- Written by: Lech Majewski
- Produced by: Lech Majewski; Angelus Silesius
- Starring: Patryk Czajka; Grzegorz Przybył; Joanna Litwin; Ryszarda Celinska; Dorota Lis
- Cinematography: Lech Majewski
- Edited by: Eliot Ems; Norbert Rudzik
- Music by: Lech Majewski; Jozef Skrzek
- Distributed by: Opus Film
- Release date: 2007
- Running time: 100 minutes
- Countries: Poland; United States

Glass Lips (Szklane Usta) is a feature film with almost no words, directed by Lech Majewski.

The film began life as an installation of interrelated short films, entitled Blood of a Poet (alluding to Jean Cocteau’s surreal film The Blood of a Poet). The installation had its world premiere at the Museum of Modern Art in New York City on May 3, 2006, curated by Laurence Kardish. Its Polish debut was at the Atlas Sztuki Gallery in Łódź from 2006-05-19 to 2006-06-18 (Polish-language name “Krew poety”)., The installation also was exhibited at the Wrocław Opera House from 2006-07-20 to 2006-07-30 during the Era New Horizons Film Festival; and, in the same year, in Gallery 2Πr, Poznań, and National Museum, Szczecin. It was described there as:

a video art screened on eight walls, the remaining works will be shown in loops on 24 screens. Entering this labyrinth, every viewer walks from one stage to another and builds his or her private story out of ready elements.

Blood of a Poet was further exhibited as a video installation from 2007-02-08 to 2007-02-18 in Berlin, during Berlinale. There it was described as “a circuit of 33 short films and a series of interrelated photographic works”.

On June 6, 2007, Blood of a Poet installation became a part of the 52nd Venice Biennale. For almost six month, until November 21, it was shown in two locations: as the non-stop outside projection on Campo San Pantalon, and on 19 screens inside the Teatro Junghans on Giudecca.

The short films of the video installation Blood of a Poet were assembled into a single feature film entitled Glass Lips, premiering in that form in February 2007 in Vancouver.,

In Poland the film in its feature-length format is known as Szklane usta and premieres on 2007-03-23.,

Glass Lips played also in Boulder, Colorado at the University of Colorado International Film Series in March/April 2007, the National Gallery of Art in Washington, D.C., and Locarno Film Festival in August 2007; The Art Institute of Chicago showed it in September 2007; the UCLA Film Archive in October, and in November it was presented by SIFF Seattle; Portland Art Museum; Cleveland’s Wexner Arts Center; and Berkeley Art Museum / Pacific Film Archive.

On November 7, 2007, Glass Lips opened in New York City. The New York Times critic, Jeannette Catsoulis, wrote: “Lech Majewski creates an aesthetic of dysfunction that’s as beautiful as it is disturbing. After a while the film’s expressiveness becomes so hypnotic that it’s difficult not to make your own connections.” Joe Leydon of Variety wrote: “Glass Lips exerts a chilly fascination from minute to minute… Experimental pic by noted Polish-born artist-filmmaker is a harshly beautiful, dialogue-free meditation on the indelible influence of childhood trauma.” New York Post film critic, V. A. Musetto, gave the film three and a half stars (out of four) and wrote: “The hypnotic, painterly images of Glass Lips combine with haunting music in one of the most unusual, beautiful films of the year.”

The film stars Patryk Czajka as Sebastian, Joanna Litwin as Sebastian’s mother, and Grzegorz Przybył as Sebastian’s father. As the film begins, Sebastian is in a mental asylum; he recalls events from his life beginning with his birth. Many of the sequences of the film are surrealistic. None of the actors speak any words, but the electronic voice of an answering machine gives the date at one point, and there is a voice-over song that gets repeated.

The film includes some shocking images, such as a woman who gives birth to a large bloody rock, and a man eating dog food.

In addition to directing, Majewski is credited as the writer, producer, and cinematographer.

== Cast ==
- Patryk Czajka as Sebastian
- Joanna Litwin as Mother
- Grzegorz Przybył as Father
- Ryszarda Celińska as Older Mother
- Leonard Brzoza as Sebastian - teenage boy
- Warner Widera as Sebastian - kid
- Dorota Lis as Doris
- Michalina Rutowska as Maid
