= Lior Shamriz =

German film director (born 1978)

Lior Shamriz (born September 13, 1978) is a writer, producer, and film director. They reside in Oakland, California.

== Early life ==
Shamriz was born to a Jewish-Iraqi mother and a Jewish-Iranian father in Ashkelon, a working-class city in southern Israel. Their mother was born in Amarah, Iraq, and their father in Shiraz, Iran. Both emigrated with their families as children in the aftermath of the 1948 war. At 19, Shamriz dropped out of the army for personal and political reasons and moved to Tel Aviv, where they began working on collective art publications and computer-generated music. Critical of Israeli nationalism in press interviews and in their film work, Shamriz immigrated to Berlin in 2006, pursuing graduate studies at the Institute for Time-Based Media of the Berlin University of the Arts, and eventually gave up their Israeli citizenship.

== Career ==
Dimitri Eipides from the Thessaloniki International Film Festival noted that Shamriz "develops his own écriture, experimenting with form, deconstructing narratives and reconstructing their pieces into something unique, which bears his own personal trademark". Working in the intersection of art cinema, performance, and essay films, Shamriz's work draws on various legacies, such as queer cinema, underground film, and Persian pop.

Their first long film, Japan Japan (2006-2007), a micro-budget independent production, was presented at about fifty international film festivals, among them the Locarno International Film Festival, the Sarajevo Film Festival, Buenos Aires International Festival of Independent Cinema and MoMA's New Directors/New Films Festival where chief film curator Rajendra Roy had noted it as one of the top ten film of the year. A controversial and polarizing film, it tells a kaleidoscopic story of a young queer pacifist drop-out who is unable to leave Israel, juxtaposing saturated pop music, pixelated virtual travelogues with poetry by Constantine P. Cavafy and Charles Olson, together with dramatic scenes and pornographic imagery.

Saturn Returns (2009), their next long film, premiered opening Torino Film Festival's Onde, was nominated for the Max Ophüls Preis at the film festival in Saarbrücken, Germany and co-won the New Berlin Award at Achtung Berlin film festival. Return Return (2010), a non-narrative video based on clips from Saturn Returns, premiered at the 60th Berlin Film Festival’s Forum Expanded, where later The Runaway Troupe of the Cartesian Theater (2013) and Cancelled Faces (2015) would have their world premiere as well. In addition to long films they created many short films, winning awards at the International Short Film Festival Oberhausen in 2013, 2014 and 2015, as well as dozens of commissioned poetry videos for writers such as Heather McHugh, Ocean Vuong, Douglas Kearney, and Victoria Chang.

In 2021, Shamriz was one of the participants in John Greyson's experimental short documentary film International Dawn Chorus Day. In 2022, they premiered their feature-film Estuaries, a drama/comedy about a musician with a past as an activist in Israel/Palestine, who struggles with his immigration status following the death of his U.S. partner.

== Filmography ==
- (2005) Return to the Savanna (6 Short Movies, approx. 75 minutes)
- (2006) Ho! Terrible Exteriors (28 minutes)
- (2007) The Farewell (45 minutes)
- (2007) Before the flowers of friendship faded friendship faded (7 minutes)
- (2007) Japan Japan (65 minutes)
- (2007) The Whitman Project (50 minutes, co-directed with Heinz Emigholz)
- (2008) The vacuum cleaner (8 minutes)
- (2008) The Magic Desk (10 minutes)
- (2009) Saturn Returns (90 minutes)
- (2010) Ritenuto (63 minutes) – Saturn Returns - Satellite Film
- (2010) Titan (50 minutes) – Saturn Returns - Satellite Film
- (2010) Return Return (26 minutes) – Saturn Returns - Satellite Film
- (2011) Mirrors For Princes (60 minutes)
- (2012) A Low Life Mythology (80 minutes)
- (2012) Beyond Love and Friendship (18 minutes)
- (2013) The Present of Cinema (7 minutes) (commissioned by International Short Film Festival Oberhausen)
- (2013) The way of the Shaman (multiscreen video installation with Naama Yuria)
- (2013) The Runaway Troupe of the Cartesian Theater (18 minutes)
- (2014) L'amour sauvage (25 minutes)
- (2014-2015) 6 music videos for Kreidler (6 videos, approx. 35 minutes)
- (2015) The night (7 minutes)
- (2015) Cancelled Faces (80 minutes)
- (2016) Fallen Blossoms (70 minutes)
- (2017) The Cage (65 minutes)
- (2022) Estuaries (101 minutes)
- (2022) Port Saïd, Santa Cruz, Sarmad Kashani (14 minutes)
- (2023) Even a Dog in Babylon is Free (17 minutes)
