= Pravo Ljudski Film Festival =

- Location: Sarajevo, Bosnia and Herzegovina
- Founded: 2006; 20 years ago
- Festival date: Every September
- Language: International
- Website: www.pravoljudski.org

The Pravo Ljudski Film Festival (Bosnian: Pravo ljudski festival / Право Људски Фестивал) is an annual human rights documentary film festival held in Sarajevo, Bosnia and Herzegovina. The name translates to Totally Human. It was established in 2006 with the goal of promoting socially engaged non-fictional audiovisual projects, dedicated to the development of critical spectatorship through socially engaged documentaries and independent art cinema. It is held for two weeks in November. The festival has developed an independent non-profit civic association under the same name. It is the largest festival of its kind in Southeastern Europe.

== History ==
The festival takes its roots from a 2005 documentary film screening for students of the European Regional MA in Democracy and Human Rights in South East Europe. It was established one year later as an international documentary festival. The first edition was held in June 2006 and it organized screenings of 17 films, while hosting 7 international filmmakers. The next year's edition widened the program and launched numerous annual workshops as part of the festival. Pravo Ljudski screens over 100 films from 45 different countries a year.

Since its inception, the festival has remained committed to a non-commercial model, offering all screenings and events free of charge to ensure accessibility and inclusive engagement with its diverse audiences.

== Format and programmes ==
The festival is made up of several programs, of which only one carries a competition format: the Best New Film program and it awards the Extra Muros Award to the best young director of the festival. The Zoom Rights Youth Program is an experience-sharing platform merging socially engaged cinema and art, youth activism and experiential and non-formal educational opportunities. As an educational program, it functions on three levels: critical (understanding and analysing films and themes covered by different films or artworks through interactive discussions and workshops); cultural (widening youth experiences of film through interactive lectures) and creative (young people creating films themselves). Although the Zoom Rights Youth Program functions as a year-long platform of activities run by the Pravo Ljudski civic association, its festival activities, in the form of a three-day youth festival within the annual Pravo Ljudski Film Festival aimed at audience aged 14 to 25 is the most prominent activity. Central to Zoom Rights is Zoom Documentary Film, which features screenings of creative documentary cinema covering a range of topics. The Zoom Lights is another program that presents socially engaged audio projects from across the world and organizes sound design workshops.

=== A-Lab Activist Art Laboratory ===
A screening during the 2023 edition.

The A-Lab is an annual multi-discipline workshop designed to promote collaborations between artists that use different media such as photography, film, sound design and animation. It is structured around three creative disciplines – photography, creative documentary film and comic book art. Participants focus on one chosen discipline, but rely on experience sharing and an interdisciplinary approach to execute their respective projects. The working language for all projects must be English.

=== Zoom School ===
The Zoom School is an educational platform created with the goal of supporting public educators in the process of formal and informal education. The program works with primary and secondary school teachers by familiarizing them with audio-visual material and films that can help them in the educational process. The school organizes three-day long seminars four times a year, with an annual symposium being held during the festival. One of the primary goals of the School is developing a sensibility towards independent cinema and audiovisual arts in school children.

=== Pravo Ljudski on the road ===
Pravo Ljudski on the road is an initiative founded by the festival in 2009. It extends the festival's reach by screening its programs in various cities and towns across Bosnia and Herzegovina. The initiative works in cooperation with numerous NGOs and civic associations in the towns that are visited by the festival.

== Jugo Film ==
Jugo Film is a film production department established in 2011 by the festival and its sister civic association with the aim of connecting socially engaged filmmakers from the Former Yugoslavia and producing their projects. It has, as of 2018, produced more than 20 documentary films that have been broadcast on Bosnian national television.

== Extra Muros Award winners ==
Year	English title	Original title	Director(s)	Country
2007	Colors of the Invisible	Boje nevidljivog	Magdalena Petrović	Croatia
2008	God Looks Like Me	—N/a	Osato Dixon	United States
2009	War Child	—N/a	Karim Chrobog	United States
2010	Nowhere in Europe	Nigdzie w Europie	Kerstin Nickig	Germany
2011	Regretters	—N/a	Marcus Lindeen	Sweden
2012	Our Way of Life	A Nossa Forma de Vida	Pedro Filipe Marques	Portugal
2013	beyond Wriezen	Nach Wriezen	Daniel Abma	Germany
2014	Secret	Segreto	Cyop& Kaf	Italy
2015	I Am the People	Je Suis Le Peuple	Anne Roussillon	France
2016	Ama-san	—N/a	Claudia Varejao	Portugal
2017	Without Noise, the Dummy of the Desert	Sans bruit, les figurants du desert	Gilles Lepore	Switzerland
2018	Without Noise, the Dummy of the Desert	Nad-egzistencijalizam	Anur Hadžiomerspahić	Bosnia and Herzegovina
2019	Burning Field	Goruće polje	Mila Panić	Germany

== Gallery ==
The 2022 edition.

Kumjana Novakova and Diana Toucedo, 2018.

Ian Soroka, 2018.

Hrvoje Klasić lecturing on May 68, 2018.
