= ( ) (film) =

2003 film by Morgan Fisher

- Directed by: Morgan Fisher
- Written by: Morgan Fisher
- Produced by: Morgan Fisher
- Cinematography: Morgan Fisher
- Release date: October 18, 2003 (US)
- Running time: 21 minutes
- Country: United States
- Language: Silent

( ) is a 2003 silent film directed by Morgan Fisher.

== Summary ==
The film consists entirely of insert shots extracted from feature films, considering the "status of the insert shot in an ingenious way", according to film expert Susan Oxtoby.

Fisher said of his film, "Inserts are above all instrumental. They have a job to do, and they do it; and they do little, if anything, else. Sometimes inserts are remarkably beautiful, but this beauty is usually hard to see because the only thing that registers is the news, the expository information, that the insert conveys... By chance, I learned that the root of 'parenthesis' is a Greek word that means the act of inserting. And so I was given the title of the film."

== Synopsis ==
P. Adams Sitney, Professor of Visual Art at Princeton University, wrote a short essay for Artforum International "Medium Shots: the films of Morgan Fisher" in which he describes the film "( )." "Fisher's most recent film, ( ), succeeds astonishingly where Frampton's parallel effort, Hapax Legomena: Remote Control (1972) failed; it uses aleatory methods to release the narrative unconscious of a set of randomly selected films. ( ) is made up entirely of "inserts" from feature films organized according to Oulipian principles. Inserts were usually shot by assistants when star actors, large crews, or expensive sets were not needed. These include details of weapons, wounds, letters, signs, tombstones, machinery, games of chance, timepieces, money, and even intimate caresses. Fisher culled the inserts from a number of films he collected for that purpose and edited them together under constraints he does not fully reveal; he places the inserts from a given film in the order in which they appeared in that film, but two inserts from the same film never follow each other directly in his assemblage. Alternating among them we catch glimpses of violence, intrigue, high-stakes gambling, and sexual adventure."

== Screening ==
( ) was screened on October 18, 2003, during the New York Film Festival, and on September 13, 2004, at the 2004 Toronto International Film Festival as part of the Wavelengths programming.
