= D.J. Mendel =

- Born: United States
- Occupations: Actor, playwright, screenwriter, director, author
- Known for: Meanwhile

D.J. Mendel is an American actor, playwright, screenwriter, director and author known for his work with film director Hal Hartley.

Mendel is known for such films and theater productions as Meanwhile, My America, Suppose Beautiful Madeline Harvey, Dick Done Broke, Charlie, Panic! (How to Be Happy!) and Fay Grim.

== Critical reception ==
The New York Times said in its review of Mendel's theater piece Dick Done Broke that he wrote and starred in, "The production represents Mr. Mendel’s return to a role he originated 12 years ago, and he imbues it with a feverish drive. The intervening years don’t seem to have diminished — perhaps they have even enhanced — his grip on the character."
