= Japan Japan =

- Hebrew: יפאן יפאן
- Directed by: Lior Shamriz
- Starring: Imri Kahn
- Release date: 8 August 2007
- Running time: 65 minutes
- Country: Israel
- Languages: Hebrew; English
- Budget: US$200

Japan Japan (Hebrew: יפאן יפאן, Japanese:日本日本) is a 2007 film directed by Lior Shamriz, starring Imri Kahn.

== Cast ==
Actor	Role
Imri Kahn	Imri
Tal Meiri	Tal
Irit Gidron	Irit
Naama Yuria	Naama
Amnon Friedman	Amnon
Benny Ziffer	Benny

== Plot ==
The film tells the story of Imri, who at 19 goes to live in Tel Aviv, but dreams of moving to Japan. Through his relationships and encounters and in diverse cinematic tools, the young man's life is introduced. An exploration of living in the exotic city of Tel Aviv is presented through a hero who is himself in the midst of exploring his own choice of an exotic place. A unique correlation is formed between the hero's misconception of Japan and ours of him. The movie was constructed by both improvised and pre-scripted scenes, as required by the nature of each scene.

The film presents internal conflicts in a personal way and explores themes of otherness and difference, as well as "the lives of lost and young people," according to the director.

== Production ==
The film was reportedly produced for as little as US$200, with volunteer actors and no additional crew. Nevertheless, it was presented at some prestigious venues around the world such as the Locarno Film Festival, the New York Museum of Modern Art, the Buenos Aires Independent Film Festival, and more than fifty film festivals. Due to dozens of copyright violations, the film has not been commercially released. It is, however, well distributed through the underground network of illegal art distribution.

== Awards ==
The film participated in dozens of film festivals and received extensive coverage. Among the most notable and prestigious: the Locarno Film Festival in Switzerland, selected as the best film at Mexico's Film Week, screened at the Museum of Modern Art in New York (MoMA), and featured at the Buenos Aires Independent Film Festival.

== Critical reception ==
The film received polar reviews from the critics, ranging from cutting edge and brilliant to the horror of video when it falls into the wrong hands. The film was named by MoMA chief curator as one of the top ten films of 2008.

The filmmaker said about the film: "One interesting challenge was how to create an interesting viewing experience in a film where it is impossible for the viewer to experience the film through the hero's eyes. As the hero says himself: 'Whoever looks at me, expects to see the drama or the thoughts, but the face is empty."

== See also ==
- Lior Shamriz filmography
