= Barbara Meter =

Dutch filmmaker (born 1939)

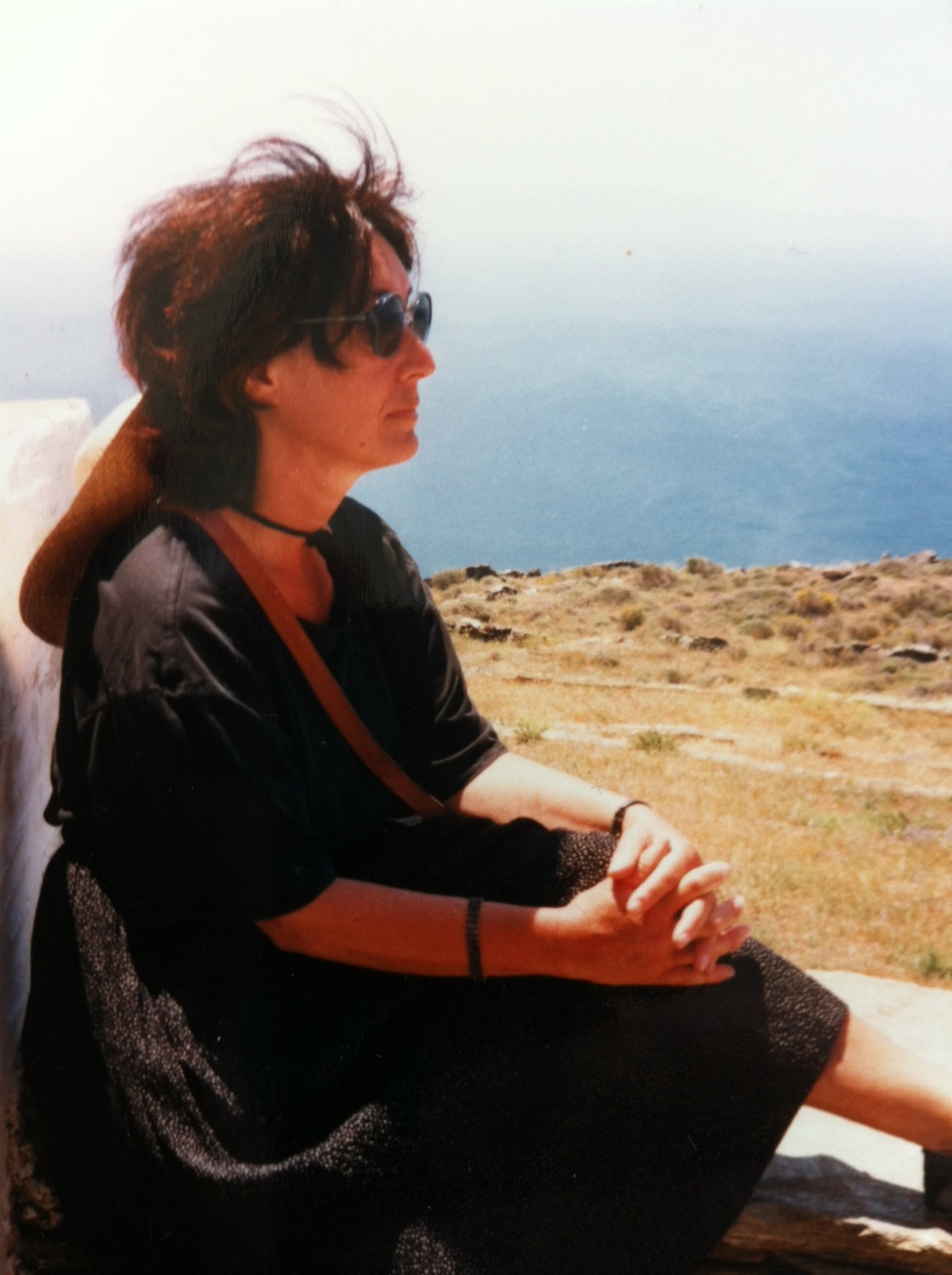
- Barbara Meter in 1992
- Born: 1939 (age 86–87); Amsterdam
- Education: Netherlands Film Academy, London College of Communication

Barbara Meter is a Dutch filmmaker and co-founder of Electric Cinema.

== Early life and career ==
Barbara Meter was born in Amsterdam in 1939 to Jewish-German parents. Meter graduated from the Netherlands Film Academy in 1963.

Meter co-founded Electric Cinema in Amsterdam sometime in the early 1970s. Electric Cinema was made to multi-screen presentations, performance-based films, and videos. The Eye Filmmuseum described Electric Cinema as a "platform for experimental and avant-garde film in Amsterdam". Electric Cinema only lasted a few years.

Meter got an MA from London College of Printing. Her thesis was on found footage.

The EYE Filmmuseum featured some of Meter's short films in an exhibit curated by Mónica Savirón.

== Filmography ==
- Aap Noot Mies (1963)
- Song for Four Hands (1970)
- Een herfstig dagje in Ruigoord (1981)
- Graffiti Amsterdam '78-'81 (1981)
- De afstand tot dichterbij (1982)
- Binnenstebuiten (1982)
- Legato (1984)
- In het voorbijgaan (1985)
- Weer-bericht (1989)
- Ins & Outs (1989)
- Laura (1994)
- Departure on Arrival (1996)
- Apparances (2000)
- Ariadne (2004)
- A Touch (2008)
- Stretto (2005)
- Bis an den Himmel und noch viel mehr (2015)
- Nachtlicht, a search for security (2022)
