= Morgan Fisher (artist) =

American experimental filmmaker and artist

Morgan Hall Fisher
- Born: 1942 (age 83–84); Washington, D.C., United States
- Occupations: Experimental filmmaker, artist
- Years active: 1968–present
- Known for: Structuralist and minimalist films
- Awards: Guggenheim Fellowship (1987)

Morgan Hall Fisher (born 1942, in Washington, D.C.) is an American experimental filmmaker and artist best known for his structuralist and minimalist films referencing the material processes of celluloid film and the means and methods of producing moving images, including the camera, the director and crew, and the editing process. Since the 1990s, Fisher has also been producing paintings and installation works. His work has been included in three Whitney Biennial exhibitions, 1985, 2004 and 2014. He was awarded a Guggenheim Fellowship in 1987.

Fisher's work has been noted for its relationship to the Southern California landscape and its architecture during a time when the region was staking an aesthetic and intellectual claim in the larger art world. Curator and critic Stuart Comer writes, "Windshields, billboards, movie screens, ocean views, econ-o-box apartment buildings and long expanses of asphalt and concrete form a unique Angeleno vocabulary of monochrome surfaces on which the symbolic configuration called California is played out. This seemingly limitless expanse of flat planes is the arena in which Fisher has staked his challenge to existing regimes of representation and narrative."

== Early life and education ==
Fisher majored in Art History at Harvard University (1960–1964) before moving to the West Coast. He attended USC from 1964 to 1965, and worked toward an MFA in the Motion Picture Division at UCLA the following year.

== Work ==
After ending his studies, Fisher worked in the Hollywood film industry, working in support roles on projects by low-budget master Roger Corman and Oscar-winning cinematographer Haskell Wexler. Between 1968 and 1974, he created ten of his own films. His 1984 16 mm film, Standard Gauge, was widely acclaimed, and inspired the title for his 2005 exhibition at the Whitney Museum.

Fisher cites visual artists, such as Sol LeWitt and Andy Warhol, as influences. His 2003 film, (), consists of a series of inserts—shots from an alternate angle, usually of details, actions, or objects that clarify the action of the main shots—harvested from 16 mm commercial films and assembled according to a system influenced by LeWitt, allowing the order of the shots to be determined by this system. Fisher explains in the film's program notes: "A rule, or a method, underlies (), and I have obeyed it, even if the rule and my obedience to it are not visible."

Fisher's work is in the collections of the Whitney Museum of American Art, New York; Centre Georges Pompidou, Paris, France; FRAC Ile-de-France, Paris, France; Museum of Modern Art, San Francisco, California; Museum of Contemporary Art, Los Angeles, California; Museum of Modern Art, New York; Moderna Museet, Stockholm, Sweden; Deutsche Kinemathek, Berlin, Germany; and Generali Foundation, Vienna, Austria. Fisher's paintings have been exhibited at the Generali Foundation in Vienna, Austria; Neuer Aachener Kunstverein in Aachen, Germany; Stedelijk Museum in Amsterdam, Netherlands; Portikus in Frankfurt, Germany; and Museum Abteiberg in Mönchengladbach, Germany.

== Preservation ==
The Academy Film Archive has preserved a number of Morgan Fisher's films, including Documentary Footage, Turning Over, and Projection Instructions.

== Filmography ==
- The Director and His Actor Look at Footage Showing Preparations for an Unmade Film, 1968
- Screening Room, 1968
- Phi Phenomenon, 1968
- Documentary Footage, 1968
- Production Stills, 1970
- Picture and Sound Rushes, 1974
- Cue Rolls, 1974
- Turning OÇver, 1975
- Projection Instructions, 1976
- Protective Coloration, 1979
- Color Balance, 1980
- Red Boxing Gloves/Orange Kitchen Gloves, 1980
- Standard Gauge, 1984
- (), 2003
- Another Movie, 2018
