= Edgewise (book) =

2014 book by Chloé Griffin

Edgewise: A Picture of Cookie Mueller
- Author: Chloé Griffin
- Language: English
- Genre: Biography
- Published: 2014
- Publisher: Bbooks Verlag
- Pages: 340
- ISBN: 9783942214209
- OCLC: 892746808

Edgewise: A Picture of Cookie Mueller is a book by Chloé Griffin published in 2014. Published by Bbooks Verlag, Edgewise is an oral history of the actress and writer Cookie Mueller.

== Background ==
Edgewise is an oral history of the actress and writer Cookie Mueller. Griffin spent roughly eight years researching and writing Edgewise. She spent half a decade interviewing nearly 90 people for the book. The book discusses Mueller's life in John Waters' Baltimore from 1966–1969, the "hippie commune" Provincetown, Massachusetts, from 1969–1976, and New York City from 1976–1988. The book contains images and photomontages of Cookie, which reviewer Emily Gould of Paper magazine said "give a beautiful visual sense of Cookie's life and times".

Griffin interviewed Sharon Niesp, who was Mueller's longtime partner and caretaker when she became ill because of AIDS-related causes. Griffin interviewed Provincetown, Massachusetts, resident Earl Devries, who said, "She wanted my sperm." He donated his sperm to Mueller, who had a son, Max. Griffin interviewed Mueller's friend Gabriel Rotello who told her, "Her memorial was incredibly well attended for a time when people were really getting tired of them."

== Reception ==
Alexandra Molotkow noted that some books spent too much time justifying the time spent discussing "unsung artists" or are more about the author rather than the subject. She praised Griffin's book, writing that unlike those books, Edgewise "feels like a tribute that wrote its own terms". Molotkow found it to be "a love story, a true love story – true love, and raw grief, for a woman who died 25 years ago". Steve Desroches lauded the book for being "impeccable in its artistry, its biography, and in its attention to, sifting through an unruly archive of Mueller's life that has yet to be assembled and cataloged".

Pati Hertling of Bomb magazine praised Edgewise for being a "a sensitive and thrilling oral history that captures her life from her childhood in suburban Maryland, through the wild times with John Waters, Divine, Sue Lowe, Mink Stole, and others in Baltimore". Travis Jeppesen wrote that Griffin "has synthesized a detail-rich biographical tapestry woven of the voices that knew Mueller best". Richard Hell, who was interviewed for the book, said when Griffin approached him, he was initially cynical of the project because Griffin had not known Mueller. But he found that Griffin's book "[did] Cookie justice" and "gives us Cookie's life and world in epic 3-D detail by seamlessly weaving together the loving and astonished testimony of most of the people who knew her".

Matt Kessler wrote in The Rumpus that Edgewise is "a definitive archive of Cookie’s life" and "a stunning portrait of both Cookie and the worlds that she inhabited". The Brooklyn Rail's Jarrett Earnest wrote, "It's great that this handsome and thorough book exists because it is the celebration Indiana calls for, and anyone interested in Cookie Mueller or New York in the ’80s will be grateful it exists." Matthew Hays of Xtra! extolled Griffin for "penn[ing] an amazing tribute to the late icon" and found the book to be "an exhilarating read".

== Chloé Griffin ==
Chloé Griffin is a Canadian artist, actress, and author who is a Berlin resident. She lives and works in Kreuzberg in Berlin. Born in California, she was raised in Canada.

Griffin's visual arts works have been showcased at New York's Gavin Brown's Enterprise. She starred in the 2009 film Saturn Returns, the 2013 film L'Amour Sauvage, and a few low-cost French and Canadian horror movies. She also starred in the 2015 film Desire Will Set You Free, a movie about Berlin's queer art locale.

Griffin grew interested in Cookie Mueller after seeing Mueller in Female Trouble in "my first year out of high school in Montreal" and reading Mueller's short stories book Walking Through Clear Water in a Pool Painted Black. She found Mueller's "intensely free and wild way of living" to be "hugely inspirational".
