= H. Nelson Tracey =

American filmmaker

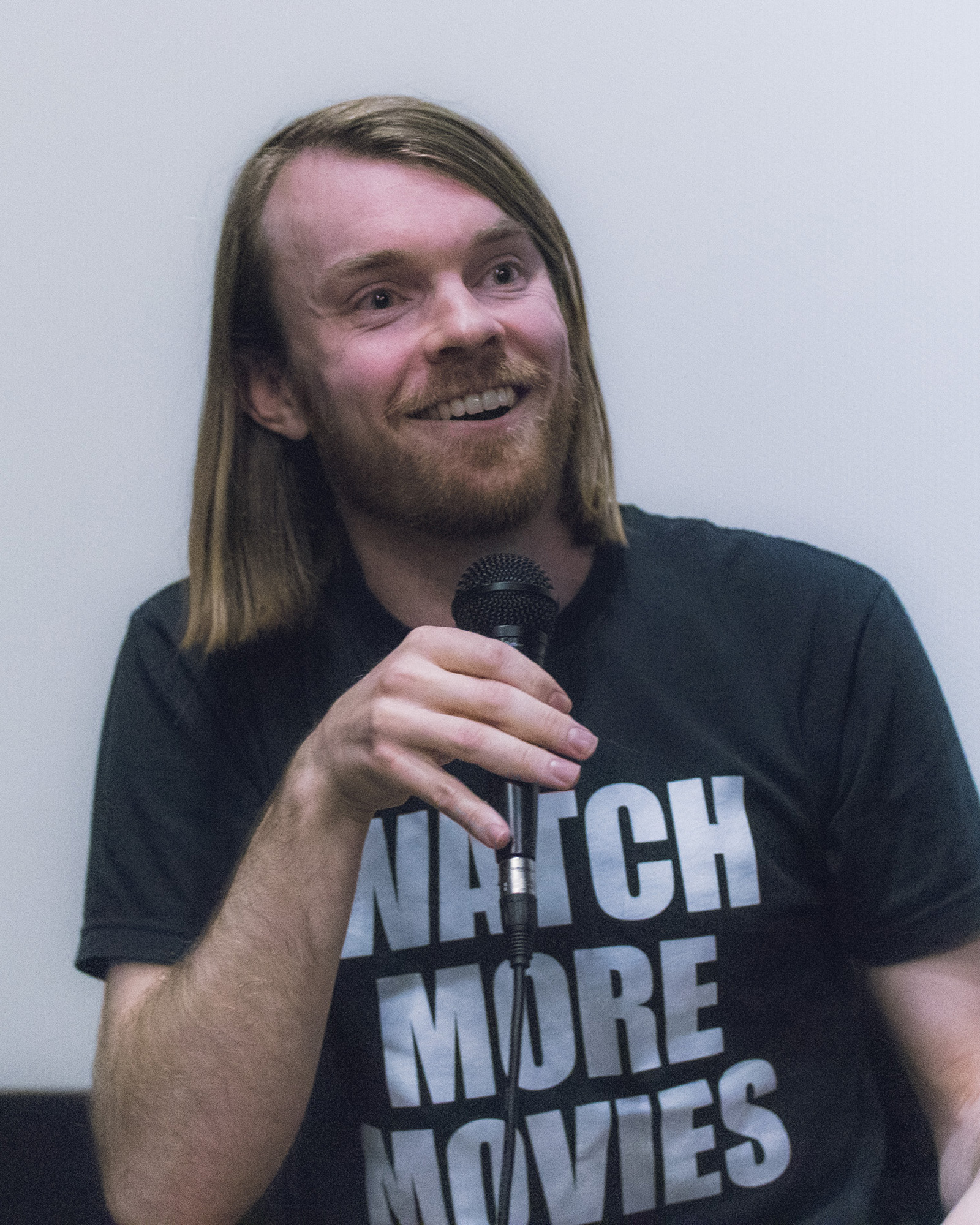
- Tracey at a Q&A for Breakup Season in 2024
- Born: Denver, Colorado, U.S.
- Education: Chapman University
- Occupations: Film director; producer; screenwriter; editor
- Years active: 2010 - present
- Website: hnelsontracey.com

H. Nelson Tracey is an American writer, director and producer best known for his debut feature film Breakup Season.

== Early life and education ==
Tracey grew up in Denver, Colorado. He had an early fascination with movies and was exposed early on to independent cinema through cinemas in his neighborhood such as the Esquire Theatre.

Tracey attended Chapman University in Orange County, California and graduated with a BFA in Film Production in 2015. He moved to Los Angeles and directed short films while concurrently working in post-production on documentaries.

== Career ==
=== 2010s ===
Tracey wrote and directed short films beginning in high school and while attending Chapman University. In the subsequent years, he'd continue directing both narrative and documentary shorts. After moving to Los Angeles, he also began working in post-production, primarily on documentary films.

From 2014 to 2019, Tracey was a movie critic and a contributing writer for Cinemacy, run by Morgan Rojas and Ryan Rojas.

In 2016 Tracey launched the YouTube channel Hint of Film, analyzing movies in the video essay format. His videos were covered by outlets such as NoFilmSchool, FirstShowing, and the BFI.

In 2019 Tracey was an associate producer and assistant editor on Ski Bum: The Warren Miller Story, directed by Patrick Creadon. It premiered at the Slamdance Film Festival where it won the Audience Award for Breakout Feature.

In 2019 Tracey directed the short documentary Picture Jasper, which was shot in Jordan Valley, Oregon near the Oregon-Idaho border. The film premiered at festivals including the Eastern Oregon Film Festival, which marked Tracey's first visit to La Grande, Oregon.

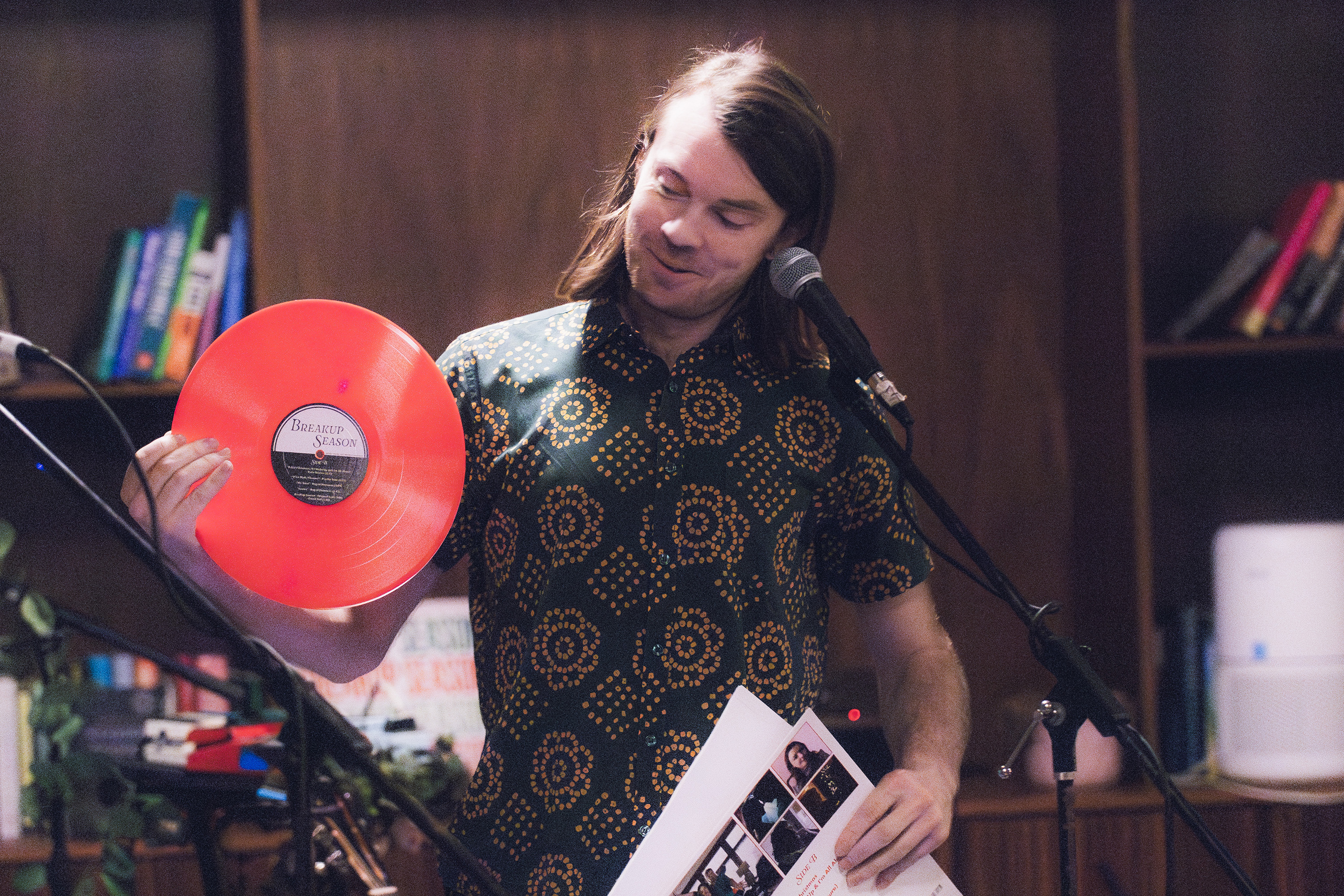
Tracey holds up a vinyl of the Breakup Season soundtrack at a release party in December 2025

=== Feature debut: Breakup Season (2024) ===
Tracey wrote, directed, produced, and edited his feature directorial debut, Breakup Season, from 2021 to 2024.

In May 2021, Tracey was invited to participate in the Eastern Oregon Film Festival's Filmmaker Residency program, where he spent a month writing and developing scripts with the intention of supporting a future film production in La Grande, Oregon. This laid the early foundations for what would become Breakup Season, Tracey's feature directorial debut.

The project was announced in October 2022, with producers Stephen Mastrocola, Rafi Jacobs, Liana Montemayor, and Christopher Jennings boarding the production. In February 2023 the cast of Breakup Season was announced to include Chandler Riggs, Samantha Isler, James Urbaniak, Jacob Wysocki, Carly Stewart, Brook Hogan, and Kailey Rhodes. Principal photography took place in February 2023 in La Grande, Oregon.

Breakup Season held its World Premiere on March 29, 2024, at the Desertscape International Film Festival in St. George, Utah. It would go on to screen at 39 film festivals across the United States. Breakup Season was released theatrically in 18 cities in the United States beginning November 15, 2024. The film was released on digital platforms on December 6, 2024, and on DVD September 30, 2025 via distributor Buffalo 8. The film's soundtrack was released onto vinyl in December 2025.

=== 2020s ===
In 2025, Tracey directed the music video “What if I Die Flying Over Oklahoma?” by artist Rae Isla.

In 2026 Tracey produced and edited the feature documentary Transforming the Beautiful Game: The Clyde Best Story, a biography of football/soccer player Clyde Best. Tracey was selected as the Port Townsend Film Festival's Filmmaker in Residence.

== Critical reception ==
On the review aggregator website Rotten Tomatoes, 94% of 16 critics' reviews are positive for Breakup Season, highlighting the writing and performances.

On The Oregonian, Kristi Turnquist wrote that "Breakup Season offers characters who don’t always act in ways you might expect, lets the good cast of actors shine, and by the end, earns genuine emotion, with a conclusion that feels totally right." On Film Threat, Sabina Dana Plasse scored the film an 8 out of 10, writing in her review consensus section: "a promising seasonal classic for 20-somethings and the rest of us."

Tracey received awards for Breakup Season, including a special jury commendation for screenplay from the Port Townsend Film Festival, from a jury composed of Kirsten Smith, SJ Chiro, and Ariel Estrada.

== Filmography ==
=== Director ===
==== Feature films ====
- Breakup Season (2024)

==== Short films ====
- The Hook Up (2010)
- A Private Matter (2013)
- Spare the Kid (2013)
- Don't Tell My Mom (2015)
- Out of Focus (2015)
- Rock Men (2016)
- Picture Jasper (2019)
- Conspiracy Party (2019)

=== Producer / Associate Producer ===
- Ski Bum: The Warren Miller Story (2019)
- The King of Color (2025)
- Transforming the Beautiful Game: The Clyde Best Story (2026)
