= Breakup Season =

2024 independent film

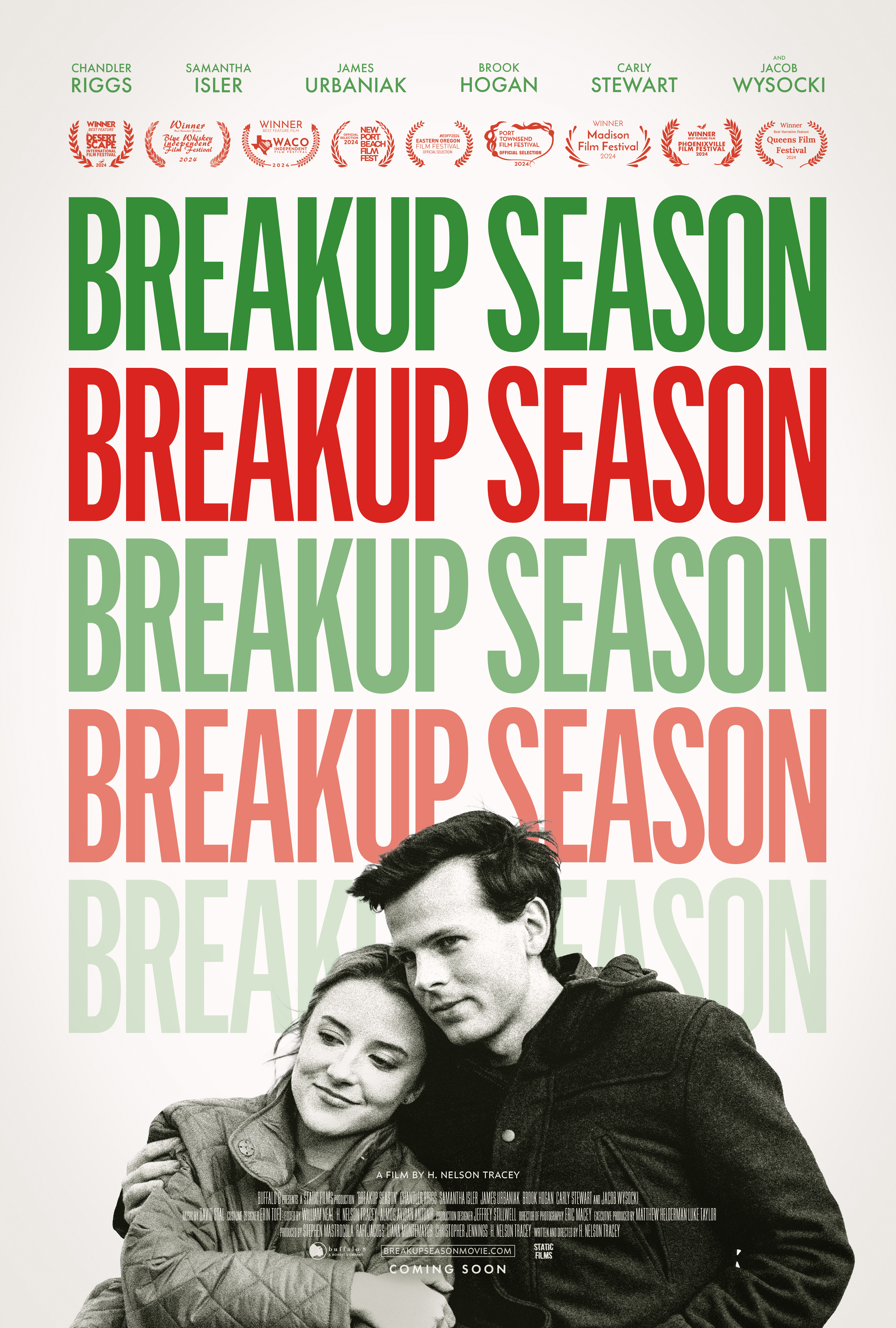
- Theatrical release poster
- Directed by: H. Nelson Tracey
- Written by: H. Nelson Tracey
- Produced by: Stephen Mastrocola; Rafi Jacobs; Liana Montemayor; Christopher Jennings; H. Nelson Tracey
- Starring: Chandler Riggs; Samantha Isler; James Urbaniak; Brook Hogan; Carly Stewart; Jacob Wysocki
- Cinematography: Eric Macey
- Edited by: Almog Avidan Antonir; William Neal; H. Nelson Tracey
- Music by: David Stal
- Production company: Static Films
- Distributed by: Buffalo 8
- Release dates: March 29, 2024 (Desertscape International Film Festival); November 15, 2024 (U.S.)
- Running time: 102 minutes
- Country: United States
- Language: English

Breakup Season is a 2024 American romantic dramedy film written & directed by H. Nelson Tracey. The film stars Chandler Riggs, Samantha Isler, and James Urbaniak, and follows a young couple whose relationship unravels during a Christmas visit to a rural Oregon hometown. Independently produced and financed, the project was developed through the Filmmaker Residency at the Eastern Oregon Film Festival. It was filmed on location in La Grande, Oregon.

Breakup Season had its world premiere at the Desertscape International Film Festival in St. George, Utah on March 29, 2024. It had a limited theatrical release starting November 15, 2024, followed by a worldwide digital release on December 6, 2024. It received generally positive reviews from critics.

== Plot ==
Ben Russell (Chandler Riggs) brings his girlfriend Cassie (Samantha Isler) to his rural hometown for Christmas. Not long after they arrive, tensions within the family and unresolved issues in the couple's relationship lead to an argument that ends in a breakup. Cassie plans to return home, but winter weather and the town's remote location make travel impossible. Forced to remain together for the rest of the holiday, she and Ben navigate the discomfort of their recent breakup while spending Christmas together alongside Ben's family.

== Cast ==
- Chandler Riggs as Ben
- Samantha Isler as Cassie
- James Urbaniak as Kirby
- Brook Hogan as Mia
- Carly Stewart as Liz
- Jacob Wysocki as Gordon
- Kailey Rhodes as Cristina

== Development ==
Breakup Season was developed through the Filmmaker Residency program at the Eastern Oregon Film Festival, which provided writer-director H. Nelson Tracey with time, creative space, and resources to develop the screenplay, marking his feature-length debut as a writer and director. The script evolved through live readings and local engagement, forming the foundation for the film's emotional and geographic setting.

== Production ==
Principal photography took place in February 2023 in La Grande, Oregon. Local community members participated as extras and provided logistical support. The production was featured in local coverage for its positive impact on the community.

== Release ==
=== World premiere ===
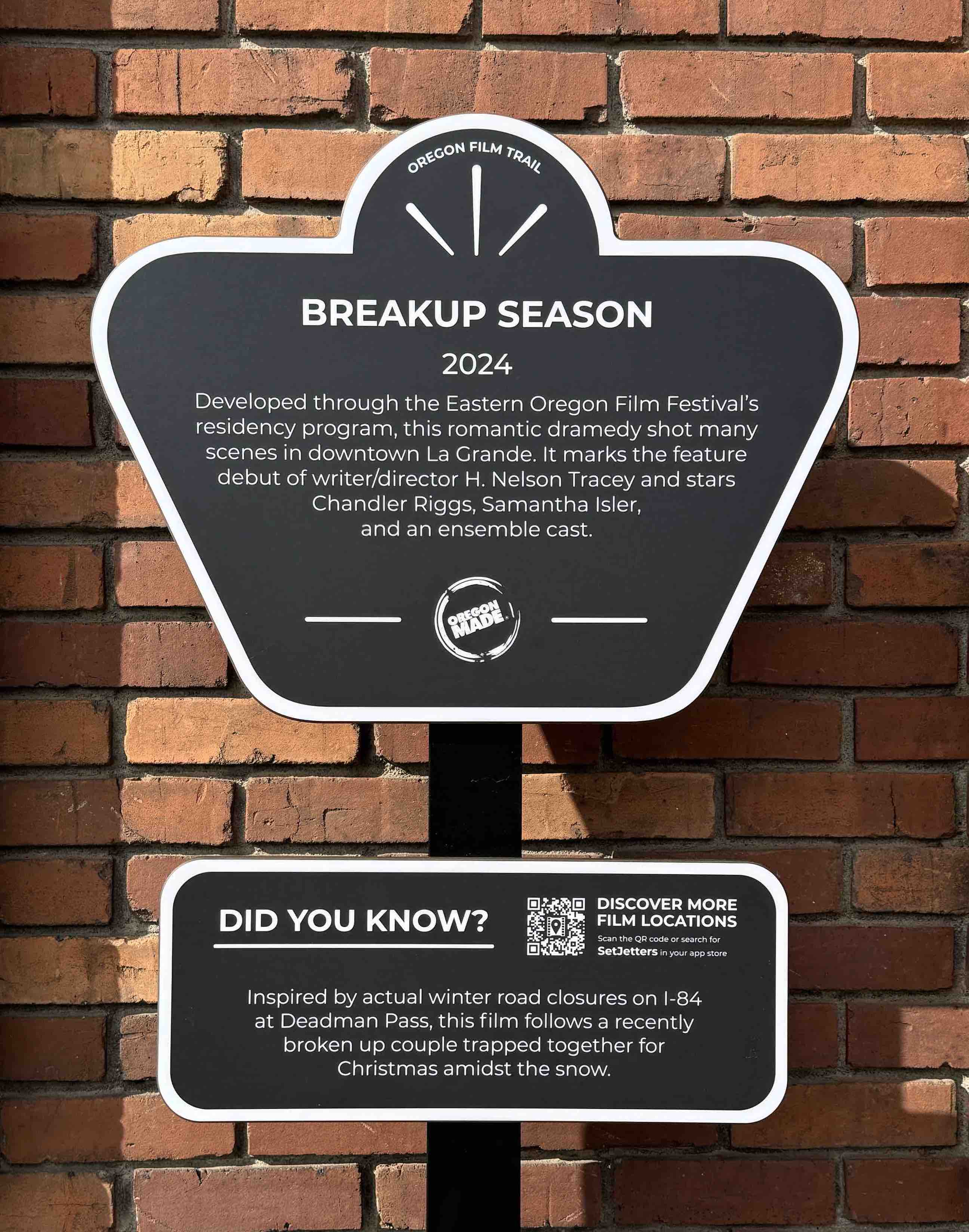
The Oregon Film Trail marker for Breakup Season in Downtown La Grande, added October 2024 in conjunction with the La Grande premiere

Breakup Season held its World Premiere on March 29, 2024 at the Desertscape International Film Festival in St. George, Utah. Cast and crew attended the premiere, including all 6 members of the principal ensemble cast, and the film received 4 awards from the festival.

=== Festival circuit ===
Breakup Season screened at 39 film festivals in the United States. Notable Film Festival selections included: Newport Beach, Port Townsend, Waco Independent, Julien Dubuque, RiverRun, and San Antonio. The film received multiple jury and audience awards on the festival circuit.

Denver premiere

Breakup Season had its Denver premiere at the Esquire Theatre on June 19, 2025. The film's writer-director H. Nelson Tracey grew up blocks away from the Esquire Theatre, and the sold-out screening was one of the final public events at the historic 97-year-old venue before its closure. It was covered by several local news outlets.

Tulsa premiere

Breakup Season held its Tulsa premiere at the Circle Cinema Film Festival on July 15, 2024, where it served as the festival's closing night selection. The sold-out screening also coincided with Tulsa born actress Samantha Isler receiving a Circle Cinema Walk of Fame medallion, an honor she described as a surreal milestone given her long history with the theater.

La Grande premiere

Breakup Season held its premiere in La Grande, Oregon, the movie's filming location, during the Eastern Oregon Film Festival on October 18, 2024. The film screened to a sold-out audience at Eastern Oregon University's McKenzie Theatre and received a standing ovation. The screening also coincided with La Grande's addition to the Oregon Film Trail, with a marker unveiled in the downtown core the following day recognizing Breakup Season as the 43rd film featured on the statewide trail showcasing movie locations within Oregon.

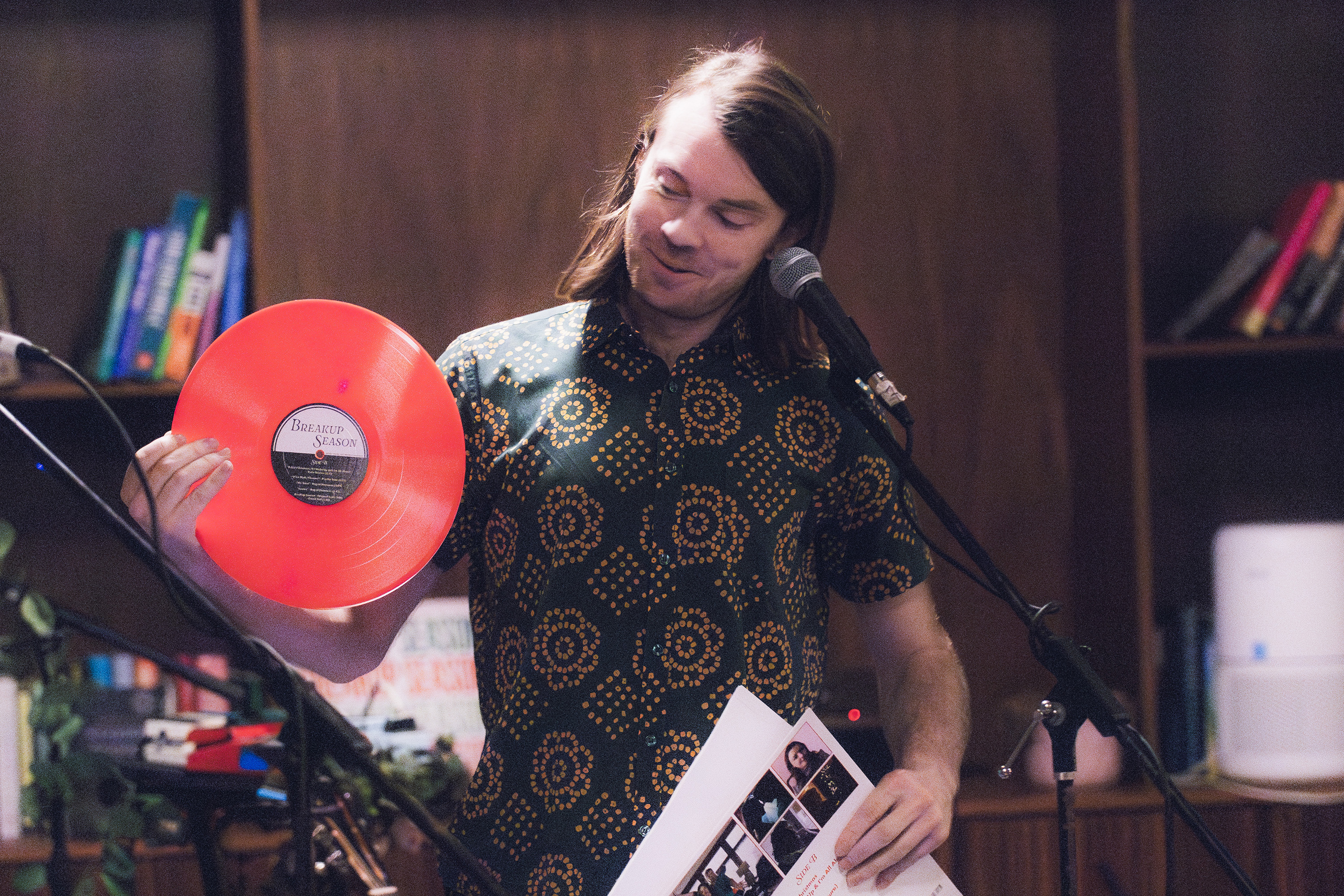
Director H. Nelson Tracey holds up a vinyl of the Breakup Season soundtrack at a release party in December 2025

=== Theatrical release ===
Breakup Season was released theatrically in 18 cities in the United States including Los Angeles, San Jose, Lexington, Mount Vernon, Tulsa, Oklahoma City, and Corvallis, beginning November 15, 2024.

=== Home media ===
The film was released on digital platforms on December 6, 2024 via distributor Buffalo 8. The film was released on DVD on September 30th, 2025, with bonus features including deleted scenes, director's commentary, and a making-of featurette.

== Soundtrack ==
Breakup Season's soundtrack was composed primarily by artists from the Pacific Northwest. It features two original songs by Bag of Hammers, who are from La Grande where the film was set. The original score was composed by David Stal.

No.	Title	Writer(s)	Length
1.	"Sweetheart"	Stephan Eicher	4:47
2.	"Alone Sitting on a Bench"	Travis Ward, Hillfolk Noir	2:21
3.	"Steady on My Merry Way"	Lucky Wüthrich	5:21
4.	"Need it or Not"	Tylor James Ketchum, Tylor & the Train Robbers	3:54
5.	"Change Your Mind"	Bart Budwig	3:12
6.	"Be My Eyes"	Nick Delffs	3:35
7.	"It Ain't Christmas (If I Wake Up and I'm All Alone)"	Katie Buxton	3:15
8.	"Christmas Tree"	Shem Thomas	2:00
9.	"It's a Myth"	Psychic Twin, Erin Fein, Nick Schneider, Dusty Ineman	4:12
10.	"We Tried" (Written for the film)	Bag of Hammers, Luke McKern and Holly Sorenson	3:33
11.	"Fences" (Written for the film)	Bag of Hammers, Luke McKern and Holly Sorenson	5:20

=== Vinyl Release ===
The Breakup Season soundtrack was released onto Vinyl in December 2025 after a Kickstarter fundraiser. The vinyl soundtrack release featured 9 tracks from the film in addition to the song "Free to Love" by Rae Isla which was used in the film's trailer, as well as a score suite by composer David Stal.

No.	Title	Writer(s)	Length
1.	"Free to Love" (From the "Breakup Season" trailer)	Rae Isla	3:28
2.	"Alone Sitting on a Bench"	Travis Ward, Hillfolk Noir	2:21
3.	"Steady on My Merry Way"	Lucky Wüthrich	5:21
4.	"Need it or Not"	Tylor James Ketchum, Tylor & the Train Robbers	3:54
5.	"Change Your Mind"	Bart Budwig	3:12
6.	"Be My Eyes"	Nick Delffs	3:35
7.	"It Ain't Christmas (If I Wake Up and I'm All Alone)"	Katie Buxton	3:15
8.	"It's a Myth"	Psychic Twin, Erin Fein, Nick Schneider, Dusty Ineman	4:12
9.	"We Tried" (Written for the film)	Bag of Hammers, Luke McKern and Holly Sorenson	3:33
10.	"Fences" (Written for the film)	Bag of Hammers, Luke McKern and Holly Sorenson	5:20
11.	"Breakup Season - Score Suite" (Compilation)	David Stal	5:00

== Reception ==
On the review aggregator website Rotten Tomatoes, 94% of 16 critics' reviews are positive.

On The Oregonian, Kristi Turnquist wrote that "Breakup Season offers characters who don’t always act in ways you might expect, lets the good cast of actors shine, and by the end, earns genuine emotion, with a conclusion that feels totally right." On Film Threat, Sabina Dana Plasse scored the film an 8 out of 10, writing in her review consensus section: "a promising seasonal classic for 20-somethings and the rest of us."

== Accolades ==
List of accolades received by Breakup Season
Film Festival	Award	Recipient	Result
Desertscape International Film Festival	Best Feature Film	Breakup Season	Won
Desertscape International Film Festival	Best Actress	Samantha Isler	Won
Desertscape International Film Festival	Best Ensemble	Ensemble Cast	Won
Desertscape International Film Festival	Audience Choice Award	Breakup Season	Won
Blue Whiskey Film Festival	Best of Fest	Breakup Season	Won
Blue Whiskey Film Festival	Best Narrative Feature	Breakup Season	Won
Blue Whiskey Film Festival	Best Director	H. Nelson Tracey	Won
Blue Whiskey Film Festival	Best Screenplay	H. Nelson Tracey	Won
Blue Whiskey Film Festival	Best Supporting Actress	Carly Stewart	Won
Waco Independent Film Festival	Best Feature Film	Breakup Season	Won
Waco Independent Film Festival	Best Performance in a Feature	Chandler Riggs	Won
Waco Independent Film Festival	Best Director – Feature	H. Nelson Tracey	Nominated
Cobb International Film Festival	Best Domestic Feature	Breakup Season	Won
Cobb International Film Festival	Best Actress in a Leading Role	Samantha Isler	Won
Cobb International Film Festival	Best Editing	William Neal, H. Nelson Tracey, Almog Avidan Antonir	Won
Madison Film Festival	Best Narrative Feature	Breakup Season	Won
Queens Film Festival	Best Narrative Feature	Breakup Season	Won
Oak Park Illinois Film Festival	Best Narrative Feature	Breakup Season	Won
Oak Park Illinois Film Festival	Best Actress	Samantha Isler	Won
Richmond Film Festival	Grand Jury Prize for Feature Film	H. Nelson Tracey	Nominated
Phoenixville Film Festival	Best Feature Film	Breakup Season	Won
Port Townsend Film Festival	Audience Award – Best Narrative Feature	Breakup Season	Won
Port Townsend Film Festival	Jury Commendation – Best Screenplay	H. Nelson Tracey	Won
Mystic Film Festival	Best Screenplay	H. Nelson Tracey	Won
Mystic Film Festival	Best Actor, Feature Film	James Urbaniak	Won
North Idaho Film Festival	Grand Jury Prize – Best in Show	Breakup Season	Won
North Idaho Film Festival	Best Feature Film	Breakup Season	Won
North Idaho Film Festival	Best Director	H. Nelson Tracey	Won
North Idaho Film Festival	Best Actor in a Feature Film	Jacob Wysocki	Won
North Idaho Film Festival	Best Actress in a Feature Film	Samantha Isler	Won
Gig Harbor Film Festival	Best Performance in a Feature Film	Carly Stewart	Nominated
Gig Harbor Film Festival	Best Director	H. Nelson Tracey	Nominated
Gig Harbor Film Festival	Best Narrative Feature	Breakup Season	Nominated
Gig Harbor Film Festival	Jury Prize	Breakup Season	Nominated
Klamath Independent Film Festival	Grand Jury Prize – Best Northern Feature	Breakup Season	Won
Eastern Oregon Film Festival	Audience Choice – Best Narrative Feature	Breakup Season	Won
Naples International Film Festival	Best First Feature	H. Nelson Tracey	Won
Mentone Film Festival	Best Feature	Breakup Season	Won
Mentone Film Festival	Best Actor	Chandler Riggs	Won
El Dorado Film Festival	Best Feature Film	Breakup Season	Won

== See also ==
- List of romantic comedy films
- List of films set in Oregon
- List of films shot in Oregon
- List of American films of 2024
