= James Urbaniak =

American actor (born 1963)

- Urbaniak in 2026
- Born: James Christian Urbaniak; September 17, 1963 (age 63); Bayonne, New Jersey, U.S.
- Occupation: Actor
- Years active: 1985–present
- Spouses: Julie Marie Anderson (m. 2003; div. 2014) Sara Pocock (m. 2017)
- Children: 2

James Christian Urbaniak (born September 17, 1963) is an American actor. As a character actor, he is best known for voicing Dr. Thaddeus "Rusty" Venture on Cartoon Network/Adult Swim's animated series The Venture Bros. (2003–2023) and as Simon Grim in three Hal Hartley films: Henry Fool (1997), Fay Grim (2006) and Ned Rifle (2014). Urbaniak also portrayed Robert Crumb in American Splendor (2003), Grant Grunderschmidt on Review (2014–2017), and Arthur Tack on Difficult People (2015–2017).

In 2005, he was nominated for the Drama Desk Award for Outstanding Solo Performance for portraying the titular character in Will Eno's play Thom Pain (based on nothing).

== Personal life ==
Urbaniak was born in Bayonne, New Jersey and lives in Los Angeles, California. He is of Polish descent.

== Career ==
Urbaniak's first media appearance occurred in 1983 when, at the age of 20, he went onstage from the audience of Late Night with David Letterman to try his hand at a monologue joke that Letterman had flubbed.

One of his first noteworthy roles was in the avant-garde playwright/director Richard Foreman's The Universe, for which Urbaniak won an Obie. He has also been acclaimed for his acting in the films Henry Fool and American Splendor, in the latter of which he played legendary cartoonist R. Crumb. He was nominated for a Drama Desk Award for his role in Thom Pain (based on nothing). He provides the voice for main character Dr. Thaddeus Venture on The Venture Bros. as well as the Doctor's brother Jonas Venture Junior, (in his first appearance, the role of Jonas Venture Junior was played by Paul Boocock for all subsequent appearances) and the super-villain Phantom Limb.

Urbaniak played a pizza guy in the famous "Whassup?" television commercials for Budweiser. The commercial was especially prominent on commercial television networks in the United Kingdom, where it became a cultural phenomenon. He also portrayed the moderator in "Human Centipede Anonymous", a Funny or Die short depicting three men who grapple with their past as a human centipede.

Urbaniak appeared on Ken Reid's TV Guidance Counselor podcast on May 13, 2015.

From 2015 to 2017, Urbaniak played Arthur Tack for all three seasons of the critically-acclaimed Hulu comedy series Difficult People, opposite Julie Klausner and Billy Eichner.

In 2017, Urbaniak played Dr. Kincaid in the film Wonderstruck, directed by Todd Haynes. Also in 2017, he played the Maaldorian Doctor on the hit series Supergirl.

In 2018, Urbaniak played the recurring role of Special Agent Owen Quinn on the CBS series Criminal Minds.

In 2019, Urbaniak played Marcus Strang in the film Where'd You Go, Bernadette, written and directed by Richard Linklater. Also in 2019, he played the recurring role of Gavin Donahue on the Apple TV+ series For All Mankind.

In 2020, Urbaniak played Professor Anthony in the film Tesla, opposite Ethan Hawke. Also in 2020, he played The Trinket Man on the Netflix series The Chilling Adventures of Sabrina.

In 2021, Urbaniak played Bram in the film Things Heard & Seen, opposite Amanda Seyfried. Also in 2021, he appeared on the television shows Dickinson, 9-1-1: Lone Star, and as the Backstage Manager on The Morning Show.

In 2022, Urbaniak played the Principal of Grand View High School in the film The Fabelmans, directed by Steven Spielberg. Also in 2022, he appeared on the television series Made for Love and appeared as Norm Wakely in an episode of the series Better Call Saul.

In 2023, Urbaniak played Kurt Godel in the film Oppenheimer, directed by Christopher Nolan. The film won 7 Academy Awards, including Best Picture.

In 2024, Urbaniak played the character Kirby in the independent film Breakup Season, alongside an ensemble cast which included Chandler Riggs, Samantha Isler, and Jacob Wysocki. Urbaniak won Best Actor at the Mystic Film Festival for his work on the film.

== Filmography ==
=== Film ===
Year	Title	Role	Notes
1994	NYC 3/94		Short film
1994	Opera No. 1	James	Short film
1997	Henry Fool	Simon Grim	
1997	The Sticky Fingers of Time	Isaac	
1998	Aphrodisiac	Deli Assistant	
1998	The Book of Life	True Believer	
1999	Ride with the Devil	Poker Player	
1999	Sweet and Lowdown	Harry	
2000	Intern	Olivier Di Santo	
2001	No Such Thing	Concierge	
2001	Upheaval	Martin	Short film
2002	Confessions of a Dangerous Mind	Rod Flexnor	
2002	Teknolust	Agent Hopper	
2002	Passengers	Man	Short film
2002	Daypass	Simple Simon	Short film
2003	Legally Blonde 2: Red, White & Blonde	Lab Technician	
2003	Briar Patch	Druden Hunt	
2003	Grasshopper	James	Short film
2003	American Splendor	Robert Crumb	
2004	Thanksgiving	Willy	Short film
2004	B Movie	Professor Friend	
2004	Boutique	Nick	Short film
2005	Fortunes	Lewis Croshere	
2005	Road	The Ranger	
2005	The Girl from Monday	Funk	
2006	Fay Grim	Simon Grim	
2006	The Last Romantic	Alex Scarvey	
2006	Death of a President	Dr. James Pearn	
2007	Across the Universe	Sadie's Manager	
2007	The Nanny Diaries	Educational Consultant	
2007	Chicago 10	Rennie Davis, Richard Schultz	Voice, documentary
2008	The Bentfootes	Jim Raritan	
2008	The Diagnosis	Dr. Besman	Short film
2010	Beware the Gonzo	Principal Roy	
2010	Hello Lonesome	Gary	
2010	Human Centipede Anonymous	James	Short film
2010	Drones	Pete	
2011	The Music Never Stopped	Mike Tapplin	
2011	Sound of My Voice	Mr. Pritchett	
2011	From the Head	Danny	
2012	Pig Goat Banana Mantis	Mantis	Voice, short film
2013	iSteve	Bill Gates	
2013	Bitter Orange	Sweetie	Short film
2014	The Boxtrolls	Sir Broderick, Workers	Voice
2014	Ned Rifle	Simon Grim	
2014	The Occupants	Glen	
2014	Such Good People	Dr. Cooper Whitehead	
2015	Advantageous	Fisher	
2016	After Adderall	The Agent	
2017	Dave Made a Maze	Harry	
2017	Rebel in the Rye	Gus Lobrano	
2017	Wonderstruck	Dr. Kincaid	
2018	Suicide Squad: Hell to Pay	Professor Pyg	Voice
2019	Where'd You Go, Bernadette	Marcus Strang	
2020	Tesla	Professor Anthony	
2020	For Madmen Only	Del Close	Documentary
2021	Things Heard & Seen	Bram	
2022	Beauty	Irv Merlin	
2022	The Fabelmans	Grand View High School Principal	
2023	Condor's Nest	Heinrich Himmler	
2023	Invitation to a Murder	Gordon	
2023	Taz: Quest for Burger	Rocky	Voice
2023	The Country Club	Victor Simmons	
2023	Oppenheimer	Kurt Gödel	
2023	The Venture Bros.: Radiant Is the Blood of the Baboon Heart	Dr. Thaddeus "Rusty" Venture	Voice
2023	Gonzo Girl	Lionel	
2024	The Rainbow Bridge	Herb	Short film
2024	Puddysticks	Boss	
2024	Breakup Season	Kirby	
2024	Thelma the Unicorn	Confused Fan	Voice
2024	Test Screening	The Observer	
2024	Laws of Man	Proprietor Isaac	
2025	Every Heavy Thing	William Shaffer	
2025	Theatre People	Drama Teacher	
2026	Grind	Richard	
2026	The Last Temptation of Becky	Dr. Friedrich Metzger	
2026	Play House	Mr. Morton	

=== Television ===
Year	Title	Role	Notes
1999	Sex and the City	Buster	Episode: "La Douleur Exquise!"
2000	Daria	Police Officer #1	Voice, episode: "Fire!"; Credited as Christian Collingwood
2003	Ed	Gallery Owner	Episode: "Blips"
2003	Law & Order: Criminal Intent	Dr. Roger Stern	Episode: "Zoonotic"
2003	Berserk	Ubik / Dungeon Master	Voice, English dub, 4 episodes Credited as Christian Collingwood
2003	Space Pirate Mito	Owari	Voice, English dub, 4 episodes
2003–2018	The Venture Bros.	Dr. Venture / Phantom Limb / Jonas Venture Jr. / Various voices	Voice, main role
2004	Hi no tori	Susanoo	Voice, English dub, 2 episodes
2004	Law & Order: Special Victims Unit	Wade Donato	Episode: "Head"
2006–2007	Kidnapped	The Accountant	7 episodes
2007	SuperNormal	Meowman/Mr. Tabby	Voice, episode: "Evil Barks and Wets the Carpet"
2007	Numb3rs	Binky Moore	Episode: "Primacy"
2008	Terminator: The Sarah Connor Chronicles	Cafe Manager / Sarkissian	2 episodes
2008	Without a Trace	Damon Lafloer	Episode: "Closure"
2008	The Starter Wife	Gary	4 episodes
2008	CSI: Miami	Max Paulson	Episode: "Power Trip"
2009	NCIS	Dr. Rod Daniels	Episode: "Love & War"
2009	Medium	Mr. Enright	Episode: "Soul Survivor"
2009	Snake 'n' Bacon	Bacon	Voice, pilot
2009	Weeds	The Wizard	Episode: "Van Nuys"
2009–2013	The Office	Rolf	4 episodes
2010	The Life & Times of Tim	Adam	Voice, episode: "The Salty Jazz/Jews Love to Laugh"
2010	You Don't Know Jack	Jack Lessenberry	Television film
2011	Cinema Verite	Dick Cavett	Television film
2011	Wizards of Waverly Place	Rob Robinson	Episode: "Alex the Puppetmaster"
2011–2012	Homeland	Larry	2 episodes
2011–2013	H+: The Digital Series	Francis Peters	5 episodes
2012	Metalocalypse	Dr. Fsmilejera Irlelwoll	Voice, episode: "Going Downklok"
2012	Electric City	Mr. Orwell	Voice, episode: "What Aren't We Capable Of?"; web series
2012	The Good Wife	Judge Bernard Temple	Episode: "And the Law Won"
2012	The New Normal	Mr. Blakeney	Episode: "The XY Factor"
2012	Unforgettable	Walter Morgan / John Fox	3 episodes
2012	Body of Proof	Daniel Grubstick	Episode: "Mind Games"
2013	Scandal	Mike Sylva	Episode: "Whiskey Tango Foxtrot"
2013	Childrens Hospital	Future Doctor	Episode: "Old Fashioned Day"
2013	The Mentalist	Aaron Kalinoski	Episode: "Black-Winged Redbird"
2013	Monsters vs. Aliens	Rule-Bot	Voice, 2 episodes
2013	Hawaii Five-0	Gary Nathan	Episode: "Pukana"
2014	Teen Wolf	The Chemist	Episode: "Weaponized"
2014	You're the Worst	Army Priest	Episode: "PTSD"
2014	Comedy Bang! Bang!	Victor Kahn	Episode: "The Lonely Island Wear Holiday Sweaters & White Pants"
2014	All Hail King Julien	Lemur #1	Voice, episode: "Enter the Fanaloka"
2014	Infomercials	Rev. Boxley Fryer	Episode: "Book of Christ"
2014–2016	Adventure Time	Various roles	Voice, 2 episodes
2014–2017	Review	Grant Grunderschmidt	19 episodes
2015	Agent Carter	Miles Van Ert	2 episodes
2015	Newsreaders	Carob Landis	Episode: "The FMK Killer; Newsreaders: Behind the Scenes"
2015	Pig Goat Banana Cricket	Nose Picker Fish	Voice, episode: "Pig Goat Banana Cricket High Five!"
2015	Gigi Does It	Gigi's Attorney	Episode: "Glock Schlock"
2015	Dr. Ken	James Miller	Episode: "The Seminar"
2015	Brooklyn Nine-Nine	Nick Lingeman	Episode: "Boyle's Hunch"
2015–2016	The Adventures of Puss in Boots	Thriffith	Voice, 3 episodes
2015–2016	Gortimer Gibbon's Life on Normal Street	Dr. Grapehall	2 episodes
2015–2017	Guardians of the Galaxy	Ebony Maw, Acolyte	Voice, 6 episodes
2015–2017	Difficult People	Arthur Tack	28 episodes
2016	Dice	Director of the "Welcome to Vegas" Commercial	Episode: "Prestige"
2017	Supergirl	Maaldorian Doctor	Episode: "Supergirl Lives"
2017	Lego Star Wars: The Freemaker Adventures	M-OC	Voice, 10 episodes
2017	Teachers	Carl Fromm	Episode: "Dire Straights"
2017	Apollo Gauntlet	Dr. Benign, Prince Belenus	Voice, 5 episodes
2017–2018	OK K.O.! Let's Be Heroes	Mr. Logic, Joff the Shaolin Monk, Baby Ernesto	Voice, 4 episodes
2018	Criminal Minds	Special Agent Owen Quinn	2 episodes
2018	Elementary	Doctor Leo Demopoulos	Episode: "Our Time Is Up"
2018	Big Hero 6: The Series	Art Teacher	Voice, episode: "Rivalry Weak"
2019	Fam	Tom	Episode: "It's Been a While"
2019	At Home with Amy Sedaris	Denny Shnarks	Episode: "Creativity"
2019	Documentary Now!	Howard Pine	Episode: "Original Cast Album: Co-Op"
2019	Too Old to Die Young	Stevie Crockett	Episode: "The Fool"
2019	Ollie & Scoops	Dr. Toodles	Voice, episode: "Gimmie a Hand"
2019	Lodge 49	Tony	2 episodes
2019	Just Add Magic	Pierce Hamilton	Episode: "New Protectors"
2019	For All Mankind	Gavin Donahue	3 episodes
2020	Just Add Magic: Mystery City	Pierce Hamilton	9 episodes
2020	Close Enough	Commercial Bot	Voice, episode: "Robot Tutor/Golden Gamer"
2020	Chilling Adventures of Sabrina	The Trinket Man	2 episodes
2020	Red Bird Lane	Tanner	Pilot
2021	Dickinson	Ophthalmologist	Episode: "Before I Got My Eye Put Out"
2021	9-1-1: Lone Star	Imp	Episode: "Friends with Benefits"
2021	The Morning Show	Backstage Manager	Episode: "My Least Favorite Year"
2022	Better Call Saul	Norm Wakely	Episode: "Wine and Roses"
2022	Made for Love	Gogol Interviewer	2 episodes
2022	Bubble Guppies	Julius Rangoon	Voice, Episode: "Escape from Volcano Island!"
2023	History of the World, Part II	Roman Soldier	Episode: "II"
2023	Carol & the End of the World		Voice, 2 episodes
2024–2025	Palm Royale	Palm Royale Manager	5 episodes
2024	Code Geass: Rozé of the Recapture	Christoph Scissorman	Voice, English dub, 5 episodes
2024	FBI	Mike Holland	Episode: "Trusted"
2026	Batman: Caped Crusader	Hugo Strange	Voice, Episode: "Brute Force"

=== Video games ===
Year	Title	Voice role
2003	Manhunt	Innocentz gang member
2007	Manhunt 2	Bloodhound member
2009	Avatar: The Game	RDA
2011	Fallout New Vegas: Old World Blues	Dr. 0
2011	Star Wars: The Old Republic	C2-D4, Needles
2014	Star Wars: The Old Republic – Shadow of Revan	C2-D4
2015	Code Name: S.T.E.A.M.	Randolph Carter
2015	The Magic Circle	Ishmael Gilder
2019	Star Wars: The Old Republic - Onslaught	C2-D4 / Additional voices
2022	High on Life	Nipulon / Additional voices
2023	Redfall	Hollow Man / Kildere's Father
2024	Destiny 2: The Final Shape	Targe
2025	The Outer Worlds 2	Officer Durban / Middle Manager Twombly
2026	High on Life 2	Nipulon / Additional voices

== Stage ==
Year	Title	Role	Venue
1996	The Universe	James	Ontological Theater, Off-Off-Broadway
1997	South	Ensemble	HERE Arts Center, Off-Off-Broadway
2000	Sueño	Astolfo	MCC Theater, Off-Broadway
2001	Lipstick Traces: A Secret History of the 20th Century	Guy Debord / Steve Jones / Hugo Ball	Vineyard Theatre, Off-Broadway
2001	Helsinor	Claudius	Present Company Theatorium, Off-Off-Broadway
2001–2002	[sic]	Frank	Soho Repertory Theatre, Off-Broadway
2002	Shoppers Carried by Escalators into the Flames	TV / Pastor Rock	Dimson Theatre, Off-Broadway
2002	The World Over	Various roles	The Duke, Off-Broadway
2003	Fear: An Issues Project	Ensemble	Greenwich Street Theatre, Off-Broadway
2004	Thom Pain (based on nothing)	Thom Pain	The Pleasance, Edinburgh
2004	Thom Pain (based on nothing)	Thom Pain	Soho Theatre, London
2004–2005	The Rivals	Fag	Vivian Beaumont Theatre, Broadway
2005	Thom Pain (based on nothing)	Thom Pain	DR2 Theatre, Off-Broadway
2006	Leftover Stories To Tell	Performer	Performance Space New York
2006–2007	An Oak Tree	The Father	Barrow Street Theatre, Off-Broadway
2012	Travesties	Henry Carr	McCarter Theatre, Princeton, New Jersey
2024	Brushstroke	Ted Berkow	Odyssey Theatre Ensemble, Los Angeles
2024	Primary Trust	Clay / Others	La Jolla Playhouse, San Diego
2025	Parents in Chains		New Vic Theatre, Santa Barbara
2026	Primary Trust	Clay / Others	Mark Taper Forum, Los Angeles

== Other works ==
Year	Title	Role	Notes
2012	Getting On With James Urbaniak	Narrator	Podcast
2014	God is Disappointed in You	Narrator	Audio book
2014-2016, 2019, 2025 - 2026	Welcome to Night Vale	Intern James, Leonard Burton	Podcast (7 episodes, 1 live show recording, and 1 live show recording bonus track)
2015	Special Relativity	Mr. Wandell, Art Director	Radio
2016	A Night Called Tomorrow	Arch Hutton	Podcast; also writer and producer
2016	Apocrypha Now	Narrator	Audio book
2017	Patient Zero	The Dresser	Music Video Written and performed by Aimee Mann
2021	Suicide Is Murder	Man	Music Video Written and performed by Aimee Mann
