= List of films set in Oregon =

This is a list of films set in the U.S. state of Oregon. A list of films shot in Oregon is also available.

== List ==
- Antitrust (2001)
- Are We Done Yet? (2007)
- Are We There Yet? (2005)
- Bandits (2001)
- Bend of the River (1952)
- Besetment (2017)
- Big Nothing (2007)
- ‘’Blue Like Jazz’’ (2012)
- Body of Evidence (1993)
- Bongwater (1998)
- Breaking In (1989)
- Breakup Season (2024)
- Buddymoon (2016)
- The Burning Plain (2009)
- Canyon Passage (1946)
- Clear Cut: The Story of Philomath, Oregon (2006)
- Closed Mondays (1974)
- Cold Weather (2010)
- Coraline (2009)
- Dark Honeymoon (2008)
- A Day Called 'X' (1950s)
- Drugstore Cowboy (1989)
- The Edge of Seventeen (2016)
- Elephant (2003)
- Emperor of the North Pole (1973)
- Feast of Love (2007)
- Fire with Fire (1986)
- First Love (1977)
- Five Easy Pieces (1970)
- Foxfire (1996)
- Free Willy (1993)
- The Go-Getter (2007)
- Gone (2012)
- The Goonies (1985)
- Green Room (2015)
- Hear No Evil (1993)
- How to Beat the High Co$t of Living (1980)
- The Hunted (2003)
- I, Tonya (2017)
- If I Stay (2014)
- The Indian Fighter (1955)
- Just Before Dawn (1981)
- Kindergarten Cop (1990)
- The Last Innocent Man (1987)
- The Lathe of Heaven (1980)
- The Lazarus Project (2008)
- Leave No Trace (2018)
- Little Wing (2024)
- Longlegs (2024)
- Love at Large (1990)
- Mala Noche (1985)
- Maverick (1994)
- Mean Creek (2004)
- Meek's Cutoff (2010)
- Men of Honor (2000)
- Mr. Brooks (2007)
- Mr. Holland's Opus (1995)
- My Own Private Idaho
- Nearing Grace (2006)
- Old Joy (2006)
- One Flew Over the Cuckoo's Nest (1975)
- One Minute to Nine (2007)
- Overboard (1987)
- Paint Your Wagon (1969)
- Paranoid Park
- Pay It Forward (2000)
- Personal Best (1982)
- Phantasm (1979)
- Phantasm II (1988)
- Pig (2021)
- The Postman (1997)
- Prefontaine (1997)
- Rampage (2009)
- The Ring Two (2005)
- Sacred Ground (1983)
- Say Uncle (2005)
- Seven Brides for Seven Brothers (1954)
- Short Circuit (1986)
- Sometimes a Great Notion (1970)
- Sometimes I Think About Dying (2023)
- Stand by Me (1986)
- Sunshine Daydream (1972)
- The Temp (1993)
- Thumbsucker (2005)
- Tillamook Treasure (2006)
- Twinless (2025)
- Untraceable (2008)
- Wendy and Lucy (2008)
- What the Bleep Do We Know?! (2004)
- Wildwood (2026)
- Without Limits (1998)
- Without A Paddle (2004)
- Zero Effect (1998)

== See also ==
- Lists of Oregon-related topics
- Oregon Film Trail
