= Home Run (film) =

- Theatrical release poster
- Directed by: David Boyd
- Screenplay by: Brian Brightly, Candace Lee, Eric Newman, Melanie Wistar
- Produced by: Carol Spann Mathews, Tom Newman
- Starring: Scott Elrod; Dorian Brown; Charles Henry Dyson Adrian
- Cinematography: David Boyd
- Edited by: Ken Conrad
- Music by: Scott Allan Mathews
- Production company: Samuel Goldwyn Films/Provident Films
- Release date: April 19, 2013
- Running time: 113 minutes
- Country: United States
- Language: English
- Box office: $2.8 million

Home Run is a 2013 Christian sports drama film directed by David Boyd and stars Scott Elrod, Dorian Brown, Vivica A. Fox. The film was released in theaters on April 19, 2013.

== Plot ==
Pro baseball player Cory Brand is forced into a rehabilitation program in his Oklahoma hometown of Okmulgee after several alcohol-related incidents and being responsible for injuring his brother Clay in an alcohol-related car crash. Cory reluctantly enters Celebrate Recovery after phoning Clay to meet him at their deceased father's barn at the now deserted farm. Clay encourages his younger brother to keep trying. Cory eventually finds new hope when he gets honest about his checkered past and takes on coaching duties for an Okmulgee Little League team that Tyler and his best friend Carlos both play on. Emma has never told 12-year-old Tyler that Cory was his father. Tyler finds out late in the film when a newspaper article comes out about pro ballplayer Cory Brand finally devoting himself to his family. The article has a photo of Cory with Tyler, so Coach Pajerski that coaches another little league team hands the newspaper to Tyler and tells him it looks like he has a new daddy. After Carlos asks if that is Tyler, then Tyler rides off on his bicycle clutching the newspaper in search of Cory to ask Cory if he is his father. Emma realizes Tyler is not at home and jumps in her car and finds Tyler with Cory in front of the bar. She accuses Cory of using her and Tyler to get back his spot on the team in Tulsa. Tyler tells his mother Emma she lied to him about his father as Emma forces Tyler to go home with her. Before they drive off Tyler tells his mother that nothing great will ever happen as long as she is holding back. She burst into tears and jumps out of the car and rushes into Cory's arms. Cory ultimately rebuilds his relationship with his family and forgives his deceased abusive father, breaking generations of abuse that was handed down. The movie ends with the audience knowing Cory will marry Emma and do right by her and Tyler as he tells his story of recovery and redemption from their church pulpit.

== Main Cast ==
- Scott Elrod as Cory Brand
- Dorian Brown as Emma
- Charles Henry Wyson as Tyler
- Vivica A. Fox as Helene
- James Devoti as Clay
- Nicole Leigh as Karen
- Drew Waters as Pajerski
- Robert Peters as J.T.
- Samantha Isler as Kendricks
- Juan Martinez as Carlos

== Release and reception ==
The film had a limited release on April 19, 2013 in the United States and has grossed over $2,861,020.

The film was endorsed by numerous current and former baseball players, including Mariano Rivera, Adam LaRoche, Andy Pettitte, Craig Stammen, Ben Zobrist, R. A. Dickey, Barry Lyons, Bill Buckner, Tim Salmon, Dwight Evans, Jim Sundberg, Brett Butler, and Jose Alvarez, among other sports figures.

On the review aggregator Rotten Tomatoes, the film received 55% positive reviews from 11 critics.

Sean O'Connell of The Washington Post gave the film three stars out of four, saying, "Boyd uses upbeat musical cues and sun-dappled cinematography to manifest an authentic small-town, minor-league atmosphere that’s warm and welcoming, even as it addresses potentially devastating personal problems. There are religious undertones to “Home Run” as Brand labors through his rehabilitation, but Boyd doesn’t succumb to the pressure of clubbing his audience over the head with a metaphorical Louisville Slugger. The director trusts his cast to convey the message. ... Those seeking riveting baseball sequences might leave frustrated...The strongest scenes take place in dingy hotel rooms, on a deserted farm or in the rehab sessions where Brand and his fellow addicts open their hearts in search of forgiveness."

Betsy Sharkey of the Los Angeles Times was less positive, saying, "Almost from the beginning the message overwhelms the medium," and that the message was "overplayed". She said the portrayal of Cory's alcoholism "unfolds in such fits and starts that we rarely feel Cory's pain." However, she did praise Elrod's acting.

Tom Long of The Detroit News wrote, "Considering it's a movie with an avowed mission; considering that mission has to do with addiction and spiritual righteousness; And considering that the story involves a major league baseball player coaching a Little League team made up of spunky kids... Home Run is actually pretty OK." He added that "director David Boyd has an eye for crisp, lovely compositions. This movie may be preaching to the choir, but at least the preacher has good taste."

== See also ==
- List of baseball films
