= David Boyd (cinematographer) =

American cinematographer

- Born: David Russell Boyd; Cripple Creek, Colorado, U.S.
- Occupations: Cinematographer film director television director
- Years active: 1979–present
- Organization: American Society of Cinematographers
- Known for: Firefly; Without a Trace; The Walking Dead
- Spouse: Barbara Crampton (divorced)

David Russell Boyd, A.S.C. is an American cinematographer and director of television and film known for his role as director of photography for the Fox television series Firefly and the AMC series The Walking Dead. He also worked as cinematographer on the first three episodes of HBO's Deadwood. On the NBC television series Friday Night Lights he served as director of photography on 18 of 22 episodes in the first season and moved up to direct two more. He also directed the film Home Run, which was released in 2013.

== Early life ==
Boyd was born in Cripple Creek, Colorado, to a military father, and spent his early childhood in Paris, France. He was inspired to become a cinematographer after stumbling onto the set of Is Paris Burning?, where he was spontaneously recruited by the crew to drag cables for camera and lighting equipment. While attending the University of California, San Diego as physics major, he took an elective film-watching class called "Thursday Night at the Movies." The class was taught by Jean-Luc Garande, a veteran of the French New Wave and colleague of Jean-Luc Godard. Garande inspired Boyd to drop his physics major and attend the UCLA Film School to become a cinematographer and director.

== Career ==
=== Television ===
For the first ten years of his career, Boyd worked primarily as a documentary cameraman and camera operator. His big break came when he met actor-turned-director Charles Haid, who hired him as DP on the television series Buddy Faro. Boyd shot nine episodes between 1998 and 2000, and subsequently served as DP on the series Big Apple and the Syfy miniseries Firestarter: Rekindled.

Boyd served as director of photography on all 14 episodes of the cult series Firefly, imbuing the science fiction property with a Western-inspired aesthetic. Boyd got the job after quoting a line from The Searchers during an interview with creator Joss Whedon. Whedon and Boyd developed a look for the series inspired by Golden Age Western films and the 1981 film Outland. Boyd worked to incorporate lighting into the show's recurring sets, much like Gilbert Taylor's work on Star Wars twenty years prior. The series' interiors was shot almost entirely utilizing two handheld cameras on 35mm film, using wide-angle lens and wide focal lengths to create a sense of claustrophobia and confinement within the ship's interior. Boyd's work on the series has become some of the most well-known and widely acclaimed of his career.

Boyd carried over his Western aesthetic to the first three episodes of the HBO series Deadwood. He was series DP on Without a Trace, shooting a total of 42 episodes, and shot 21 episodes of Friday Night Lights in addition to directing 6 episodes. He shot 19 episodes of The Walking Dead and directed 7, using Super 16mm film to create a gritty, realistic visual aesthetic. Other television series he has worked on include Sons of Anarchy, Men of a Certain Age, Do No Harm, and Agents of S.H.I.E.L.D. Since 2014, Boyd has focused more on directing, and has served as both a regular and guest directors on shows including Once Upon a Time, Sleepy Hollow, The Night Shift, Shades of Blue, and The Mist.

=== Film ===
For much of his early career, Boyd worked as a camera operator on B-horror movies like Evilspeak, Ghoulies, From Beyond, Prison, Return of the Living Dead Part II, and DeepStar Six. Boyd had a cameo role in Puppet Master, a film on which he served as assistant camera operator, alongside his then-wife Barbara Crampton. He worked frequently with producer Charles Band's production companies Empire Pictures and Full Moon Features, and served as 2nd unit director of photography on to To Die For, a vampire horror film directed by Deran Sarafian. He was also 2nd unit DP on high-profile films in the late 1990s and early 2000s like Galaxy Quest, Cast Away, Bubble Boy, and Joy Ride. He replaced Don Burgess on What Lies Beneath after the cinematographer proved unavailable for reshoots.

Boyd's debut feature film as primary DP was Kit Kittredge: An American Girl. The following year, he shot the Renny Harlin-helmed action film 12 Rounds and the period drama Get Low starring Robert Duvall, Sissy Spacek, and Bill Murray. He made his directorial debut in 2013 with Home Run, a religiously-themed sports drama on which he also served as director of photography. That same year, he shot the sci-fi horror film Dark Skies for producer Jason Blum.

== Filmography ==
=== Television ===
Year	Title	Notes	Network
1998–2000	Buddy Faro	9 episodes	CBS
2001	Big Apple	8 episodes	CBS
2002	Firestarter: Rekindled	Miniseries 2 episodes	Syfy
2002–2003	Firefly	14 episode	Fox
2003	Threat Matrix	Pilot episode	ABC
2004	Deadwood	3 episode	HBO
2003–05	Without a Trace	42 episodes	CBS
2006–07	Friday Night Lights	21 episodes Director – 6 episodes	NBC Audience
2007	Bionic Woman	Director – 1 episode	
2009	Sons of Anarchy	2 episodes	FX
2009–10	Men of a Certain Age	5 episodes Director – 7 episodes	TNT
2010	No Ordinary Family	1 episode	ABC
2010–21	The Walking Dead	9 episodes Director – 13 episodes	AMC
2013	Once Upon a Time	Director – 1 episode	ABC
2013	Do No Harm	3 episodes	NBC
2013–14	Agents of S.H.I.E.L.D.	12 episodes	ABC
2014	Once Upon a Time in Wonderland	Director – 1 episode	ABC
2014	Revolution	Director – 1 episode	NBC
2014	Believe	Director – 1 episode	NBC
2014	Mind Games	Director – 1 episode	ABC
2014	The Night Shift	Pilot episode Director – 4 episodes	NBC
2014	Gang Related	Director – 1 episode	Fox
2014	Sleepy Hollow	Director – 1 episode	Fox
2015	Backstrom	Director – 1 episode	Fox
2015	Constantine	Director – 1 episode	NBC
2015	Murder in the First	Director – 1 episode	TNT
2015	12 Monkeys	Director – 1 episode	Syfy
2015–16	Longmire	Director – 3 episodes	A&E Netflix
2016–18	Shades of Blue	Director – 4 episodes	NBC
2016	Of Kings and Prophets	Director – 1 episode	ABC
2016	Containment	Director – 1 episode	The CW
2016	Aquarius	Director – 1 episode	NBC
2016–18	Queen of the South	Director – 7 episodes	USA Network
2017	The Mist	Director – 1 episode	Spike
2018	The Brave	Director – 1 episode	NBC
2018	The Crossing	Director – 1 episode	ABC
2019	The Enemy Within	Director – 1 episode	NBC
2020	Away	Director – 1 episode	Netflix
2025	Daredevil: Born Again	Director - 2 episodes	Disney+

=== Film ===
Year	Title	Dir.	Notes
1999	Galaxy Quest	Dean Parisot	2nd unit director of photography
2000	What Lies Beneath	Robert Zemeckis	Additional photography; uncredited with Don Burgess
2000	Cast Away	Robert Zemeckis	2nd unit director of photography
2001	Bubble Boy	Blair Hayes	2nd unit director of photography
2001	Joy Ride	John Dahl	2nd unit director of photography
2008	Kit Kittredge: An American Girl	Patricia Rozema	
2009	12 Rounds	Renny Harlin	
2012	Get Low	Aaron Schneider	
2012	Joyful Noise	Todd Graff	
2013	Home Run	N/A	Also director
2013	Dark Skies	Scott Stewart	
