= Thom Pain (based on nothing) =

Play written by Will Eno

- Original language: English
- Written by: Will Eno
- Characters: Thom Pain

Premiere
- Date: 2004
- Place: Soho Theatre, London

Thom Pain (based on nothing) is a 2004 one man show written by Will Eno. It is a rambling monologue in which the protagonist, who has suffered a lot in his life, tells the story of a bee sting, a boy with a dog that died, and his experience with a woman.

== Production history ==
The play started as a reading at the Soho Theatre and was then performed at the Edinburgh Festival Fringe in 2004. The play next opened in London at the Soho Theatre, running from 3 to 24 September 2004. It received the First Fringe Award.

Thom Pain (based on nothing) premiered in the United States Off-Broadway at the DR2 Theatre on February 1, 2005 and closed on September 4, 2005. The original production starred James Urbaniak, and was directed by Hal Brooks. Urbaniak was nominated for the Drama Desk Award for Outstanding Solo Performance for his portrayal of Thom Pain.

The play was revived at the Off-Broadway Signature Theatre Company on October 23, 2018 (previews), starring Michael C. Hall and directed by Oliver Butler.

The play has been translated into over a dozen languages, and since 2005 has been produced regularly around the U.S. and the world. Some notable American productions have been presented at Seattle Rep, the Dallas Theater Center, Theatre Wit, Hyde Park Theatre, Actor's Express, among many more. Worldwide the play has appeared in Finland, France, Israel, Holland, Norway, Portugal, China, Mexico, Germany, Greece and elsewhere.

The play was a finalist for the 2005 Pulitzer Prize for Drama, which was won by Doubt, A Parable by John Patrick Shanley.

== Critical reception ==
The play received enthusiastic reviews. David Gritten of the Telegraph wrote, "It's hard to imagine more dazzling writing on any stage in Edinburgh this year."

The Theatre Journal wrote: "Why did this production receive some of the strongest reviews of the season and a twice-extended run in the heart of New York City? The production aesthetics seem to work against popularity."

Charles Isherwood, in his review for The New York Times wrote: "It's one of those treasured nights in the theater - treasured nights anywhere, for that matter - that can leave you both breathless with exhilaration and, depending on your sensitivity to meditations on the bleak and beautiful mysteries of human experience, in a puddle of tears. Also in stitches, here and there. Speechless, in any case."

The Theatremania.com critic wrote:

At its conclusion, audience members may not know exactly what they just saw or what it was supposed to mean. Is Thom Pain a meditation on disappointment? An exercise in futility? Perhaps both. One thing is certain, however. Even if the piece is based on nothing, as its subtitle proclaims, its unconventional style makes it far more interesting than many other plays that are currently on the boards.

Ten years after the original production, Lyn Gardner of the Guardian wrote, "it's still one of the best monologues I've ever seen".
