= Sean Saves the World =

- Genre: Sitcom
- Created by: Victor Fresco
- Directed by: Marc Buckland; James Burrows
- Starring: Sean Hayes; Megan Hilty; Echo Kellum; Samantha Isler; Thomas Lennon; Linda Lavin
- Composer: Scott Clausen
- Country of origin: United States
- Original language: English
- No. of seasons: 1
- No. of episodes: 15 (2 unaired)

Production
- Executive producers: Sean Hayes; Todd Milliner; James Burrows; Victor Fresco
- Camera setup: Multi-camera
- Running time: 22 minutes
- Production companies: Garfield Grove Productions; Hazy Mills Productions; Universal Television

Original release
- Network: NBC (episodes 1–13); iTunes (episodes 14–15)
- Release: October 3, 2013 – March 24, 2014

Sean Saves the World is an American sitcom television series created by Victor Fresco and starring Sean Hayes that aired on NBC from October 3, 2013, to March 24, 2014, as part of the 2013–14 American television season. It was announced on January 28, 2014, that Sean Saves the World had been cancelled after 13 episodes had aired. Of the 18 ordered, only 15 were filmed.

== Plot ==
Sean is a divorced gay father with a successful, yet demanding, career. When his 14-year-old daughter moves in with him full-time, he is forced to juggle his work life, his mom, and fatherhood. Determined not to give life a half-hearted attempt, he reads up on parenting and about keeping a vibrant family alongside a thriving career. However, sudden work pressures dampen his grand family plans and skew his work/life balance.

== Cast and characters ==
=== Main ===
- Sean Hayes as Sean Harrison
- Linda Lavin as Lorna Harrison, Sean's mother
- Samantha Isler as Ellie Harrison, Sean's street-smart teenage daughter
- Thomas Lennon as Max Thompson, Sean's temperamental new boss
- Megan Hilty as Liz, Sean's best friend and co-worker
- Echo Kellum as Hunter, Sean's co-worker and friend

=== Recurring ===
- Stacy Keach as Lee Thompson, Max's arrogant, lustful father
- Parvesh Cheena as Jerry, Max's loyal assistant

=== Notable guest stars ===
- Craig Ferguson as Andrew Summer, Sean's ex-boss who he had a one night stand with
- Portia de Rossi as Jill, Sean's ex-wife and Ellie's mom
- Guy Pearce as Liam Stone, Max's fencing instructor who dates Sean

Hayes' Will & Grace co-star Megan Mullally was set to guest star in the seventeenth episode as Sean's sister; however, the episode was not produced due to the series' cancellation.

== Development and production ==
The series first appeared as part of the NBC development slate in December 2012, with Sean Hayes attached to star. On January 22, 2013, NBC placed a pilot order under the title Happiness. The pilot was written by Victor Fresco and directed by James Burrows. Burrows had previously worked with Hayes on Will & Grace.

Casting announcements for the remaining series regular roles began in February 2013, with Linda Lavin cast in the role of Lorna, Sean's tough and assertive mother. Echo Kellum was the next actor cast in the series, in the role of Hunter, one of Sean's co-workers, who is very passionate about his music, art, photography and poetry. Thomas Lennon then joined the series in the role of Max, the new owner of the online retail company where Sean works. In late-February, Samantha Isler joined the cast as Ellie, Sean's quick-witted daughter. Shortly after, Lindsay Sloane boarded the series as Liz, Sean's co-worker and best friend, a former therapist. Vik Sahay later signed onto the series in the recurring role of Howard, a slightly aggressive IT guy, who works alongside Sean.

On May 9, 2013, NBC placed a series order, under the new title Sean Saves the World. Two days after the series order, Lindsay Sloane exited the role of Liz: Megan Hilty was cast soon after. On November 8, 2013, NBC ordered an additional five episodes for the first season, bringing the total to 18 episodes.

With few exceptions, Sean Saves the World was shot on a closed set with a laugh track added during post-production, a point several critics have derided. Jodi Walker from Entertainment Weekly commented on Hayes' animated performance — dubbing it "flailing" — by saying, "flailing is key to cueing this show’s laugh track." Matthew Gilbert of The Boston Globe commented, "why would we want their jokes to succeed or fail based on their own merit when a laugh track can tell us what is funny and exactly when to laugh?" Ed Bark of National TV Reviews & News added that "Hayes seems wedded to the old-time sitcom religion, which calls for multiple cameras...and a laugh track...his is the only NBC comedy series with such additives, but Hayes gets a bit snippy when asked if it’s a format he favors." Beginning with Episode 12 ("The Wrath of Sean"), a live studio audience is utilized for scenes taking place in Sean's apartment and workplace.

== Episodes ==
The first two episodes of the series were directed by James Burrows, but all subsequent episodes were directed by Marc Buckland.

No.	Title	Written by	Original release date	U.S. viewers (millions)
1	"Pilot"	Victor Fresco	October 3, 2013	4.43
Sean Harrison, a single gay father, is now stuck with the task of raising his 14-year-old daughter Ellie. On the night he wants to bond with Ellie at dinner, he and his friends Liz and Hunter are stuck at work by Sean's new boss, Max. After several failed attempts to escape, Sean finally does, but Max finds out, leaving Sean at risk of being fired.
2	"Busted"	Claudia Lonow	October 10, 2013	3.26
When Ellie needs a bra, Liz offers to take. But, when the bra Liz got Ellie is inappropriate, Lorna takes her only to creep Ellie out. Liz and Lorna end up finding out, Sean is left to clear the air. Meanwhile, Max bans Sean from the break room after he overhears him talking to Liz about Ellie's problem.
3	"Date Expectations"	Michael A. Ross	October 17, 2013	3.36
Lorna sets Sean up on a date without his knowledge, forcing Sean to let Ellie go to a party. But, the date goes awry when Sean worries about Ellie the entire time.
4	"Shut Your Parent Trap"	Rick Wiener & Kenny Schwartz	October 24, 2013	3.96
5	"Nobody Puts Sean in a Corner"	Aseem Batra	October 31, 2013	3.72
Sean is unhappy when Lorna takes Hunter to dancing classes after he refuses.
6	"Sean Comes Clean"	Matt Ward	November 7, 2013	4.55
7	"The Good, the Bad and the Sean"	Mike Rosolio	November 14, 2013	2.64
8	"Of Moles and Men"	Joe Keenan	November 21, 2013	2.99
When company secrets leak out, Max forces Sean to play detective, but this backfires when Sean's secret one-night stand with their old boss Andrew (Craig Ferguson) is revealed, and everyone now thinks Sean might be the company mole.
9	"Best Friends for Never"	Seth Raab & Nicholas Darrow	December 12, 2013	3.40
10	"Sean the Fabulous"	Claudia Lonow	January 2, 2014	2.79
In order to be more involved at Ellie's school, Sean tries to be more flamboyant to impress a group of snobby women.
11	"Trapped in the Closet (Part 2)"	Michael A. Ross	January 9, 2014	3.12
12	"The Wrath of Sean"	Matt Ward	January 16, 2014	2.67
13	"I Know Why the Caged Bird Zings"	Joe Keenan	January 23, 2014	2.58
Sean decides to go on a date with his ex-boyfriend Colin (played by Humphrey Ker). Meanwhile, Max's hotel will not let him keep his birds, and he tries to get someone to take care of them.
14	"The Joy of Ex"	Matt Ward	March 24, 2014 (online)	N/A
Sean's ex-wife Jill (played by Portia de Rossi) returns on a political campaign with her new partner. Both Jill and Sean compete to win over Ellie. Lorna and Lee meet up in the same hotel that Jill booked, and Sean continually interrupts them to help Jill smooth things over with her partner, who has a nervous breakdown after getting drunk.
15	"The Dark Sean Rises"	Seth Raab & Nicholas Darrow	March 24, 2014 (online)	N/A
Sean meets Max's fencing coach, Liam (played by Guy Pearce), who secretly likes being a superhero. Sean tries to meet his every demand, which often ends up with him being hurt, and Lorna becomes vocal in trying to stop the two of them. Meanwhile, Liz gets mad at Sean for stealing her man and tries to sabotage their relationship.

== Release and home media ==
On March 24, 2014, the last two filmed episodes became available on iTunes.

The entire series is available as a made-on-demand DVD set from Universal Studios Home Entertainment, which they released in April 7, 2014.

== Reception ==
The show has received mixed reviews from critics. Glenn Garvin of The Miami Herald gave the series critical acclaim saying "Sean Saves the World is like a comedy cruise to self-discovery, with both Sean and his daughter learning of strengths and weaknesses they didn't know they had, the process punctuated with keenly funny dialogue and precision timing". David Hinckley of the New York Daily News gave the show 2 out of 5 stars.
