= Scott Elrod =

American actor

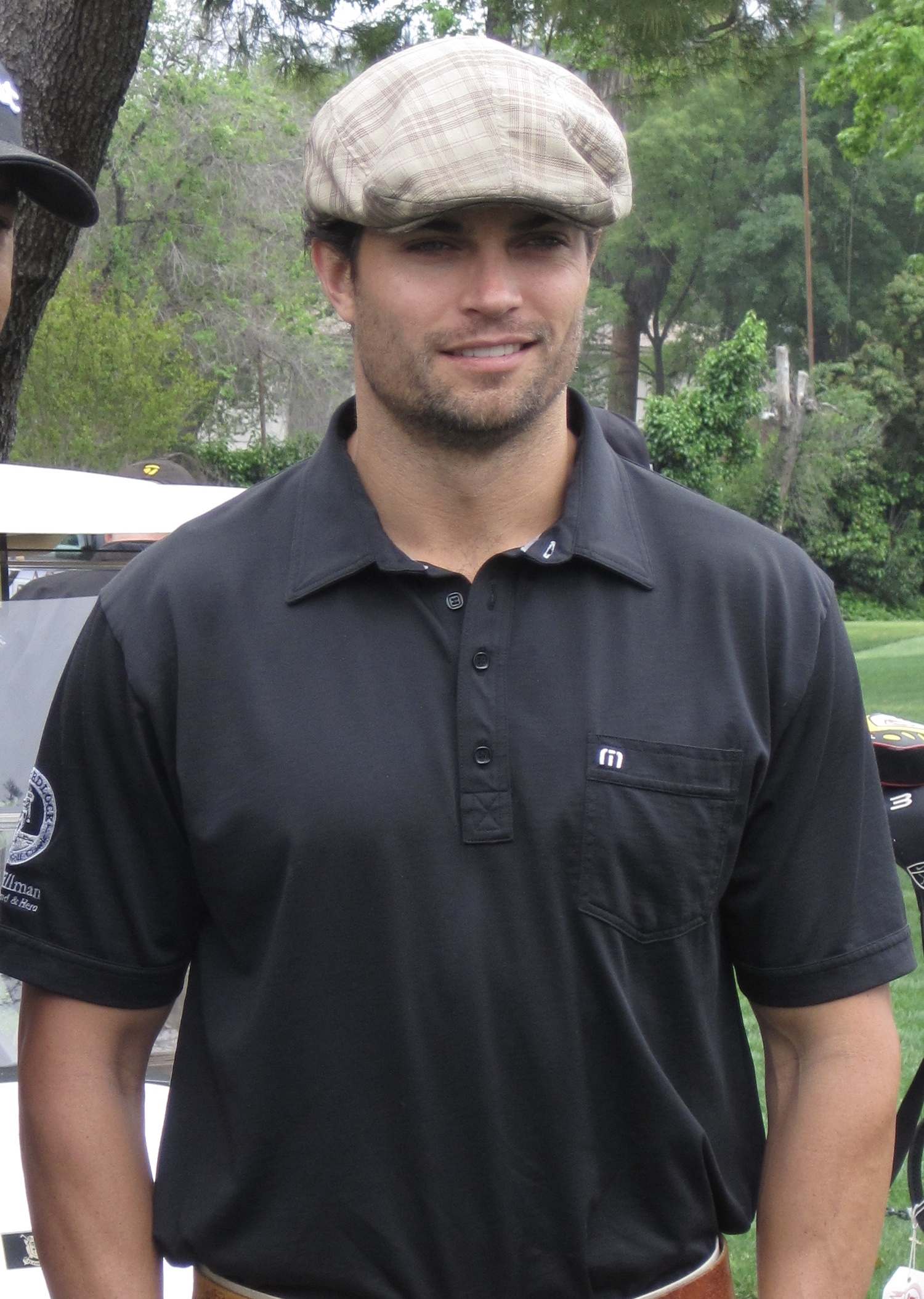
- Elrod in 2011
- Born: Scott Michael Elrod; February 10, 1975 (age 51); Bitburg, Germany
- Occupation: Actor
- Years active: 2005–2017
- Children: Lilli & Easton

Scott Michael Elrod (born February 10, 1975) is an American former actor.

== Early life ==
Elrod was born into an American military family in Bitburg, Germany. After moving around the Philippines with his family, he was raised in Parker, Colorado. His father was an F-16 pilot and Elrod wanted to become a pilot himself. He earned his pilot license after graduation and became an air traffic controller.

== Career ==
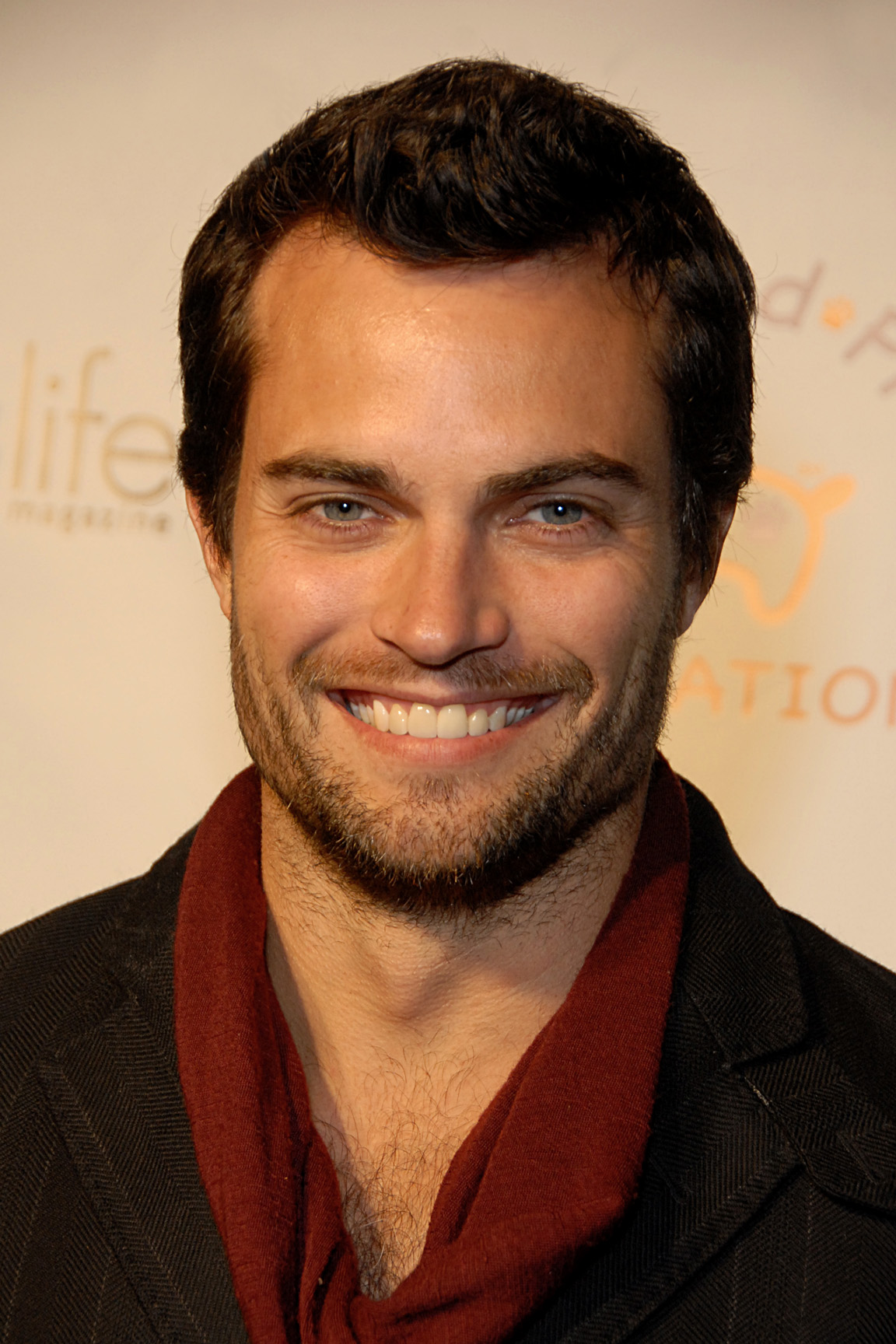
Elrod in 2010

After seeing the film Top Gun, Elrod decided to become an actor. He relocated to Los Angeles, in April 2004, to pursue a career in acting. Eventually, his performances in small parts in CSI: NY, Days of Our Lives, and the “Nothing In This World” music video by Paris Hilton, brought him to the attention of the casting crew of Men in Trees, in which he played the part of Anne Heche's friend, occasional roommate, and sometimes love interest "Cash". In 2013, he starred in the films Home Run and Lone Survivor. In 2016 he played Meredith's new man in Grey's Anatomy. On August 1, 2016, he was cast as celebrity Travis Brenner in Chicago Fire.

== Personal life ==
In December 2015, Elrod announced he and fiancée, Vanessa Vazart, were expecting a child together. Their son, Easton, was born in June 2016.

== Filmography ==
List of film roles
Year	Title	Rolev	Notes
2008	Tricks of a Woman	Rex Waverly	Hellhounds (2009) with Amanda Brooks.
2010	The Switch	Declan	
2010	Death and Cremation	Matt Fairchild	
2010	Hard Breakers	Bobby	
2011	Knifepoint	Adam	
2011	Escapee	Officer Carter Thomas	Credited as Scott Michael Elrod
2012	Vanished	Brio	Short film
2012	Stolen Child	John	Direct-to-video
2012	Argo	Achilles Crux	
2013	Home Run	Cory	
2014	Lone Survivor	Peter Musselman	

List of television roles
Year	Title	Role	Notes
2005	CSI: NY	Young male	Episode: "Grand Murder at Central Station"
2006	Desire	Daniel	
2007–2008	Men in Trees	Leonard "Cash" Morrissey	14 episodes
2008	CSI: Miami	Jim Farber	Episode: "Rock and a Hard Place"
2008	Mother Goose Parade		Television film
2009	Hellhounds	Kleitos	Television film
2009	Uncorked	Andrew Browning	Television film
2010	True Blue	Kevin Ulster	Television film
2010	Castle	Brad Dekker	Episode: "The Third Man"
2012	NCIS: Los Angeles	Brett Turner	Episode: "Neighborhood Watch"
2014	Anger Management	Tim	Episode: "Charlie Catches Jordan in the Act"
2014–2015	The Young and the Restless	Joe Clark	93 episodes
2015	How To Get Away With Murder	Gideon Holt	Episode: "It's Called the Octopus"
2016	Grey's Anatomy	Dr. Major Will Thorpe	4 episodes
2016	Chicago Fire	Travis Brenner	recurring role
2017	Sun, Sand & Romance	Eric	Television film
