= Rats! (film) =

- Directed by: Maxwell Nalevansky; Carl Fry
- Written by: Maxwell Nalevansky; Carl Fry
- Produced by: Maxwell Nalevansky; Carl Fry; Adam Levin; Alison Moses; Harrison Nalevansky; Danielle Evon Ploeger; Ariel Ash
- Starring: Danielle Evon Ploeger; Luke Wilcox; Darius Autry; Khali Sykes; Ariel Ash; Jacob Wysocki; Pineapple Tangaroa; Neville Archambault
- Cinematography: Carmen Hilbert
- Edited by: Carl Fry
- Production companies: Yellow Veil Pictures; With Pleasure Cinemagroup
- Distributed by: Yellow Veil Pictures
- Release dates: November 19, 2023 (Work in Progress Screening at Cucalorus Film Festival); July 28, 2024 (World Premiere at Fantasia Festival); February 28, 2025 (Theatrical Release); March 11, 2025 (Video on Demand Release)
- Running time: 85 minutes
- Country: United States
- Language: English
- Box office: $22,577

Rats! (stylized in all caps) is a 2024 American independent black comedy film written and directed by Maxwell Nalevansky and Carl Fry, produced by With Pleasure Cinemagroup, and distributed by Yellow Veil Pictures. The film is set in the fictional town of Pfresno, Texas in the year 2007 and follows Raphael, who, after being arrested by an overzealous police officer, gets caught up in a chaotic world of drug kingpins, ecoterrorists, mallrats, and rappers. The film blends gross-out humor with social commentary, highlighting the disorder of small-town life and youth counterculture in 2000s Texas. The film received the bronze audience award for Best International Feature at the 2024 Fantasia Film Festival.

Rats! was released in select theaters by Yellow Veil Pictures on February 28, 2025.

== Plot ==
Raphael, a young man from Pfresno, Texas, is arrested by the unhinged Officer Williams for graffiti. After his release from jail, he becomes entangled in a mission targeting his cousin Mateo, suspected of possessing nuclear weapons. Raphael's confession to Mateo uncovers a personal vendetta Officer Williams has against him from high school, complicating the situation further.

== Summary ==
After being caught doing graffiti, Raphael "Raphi" Tinski is pressured by deranged Pfresno cop and sometime waffle house waitress Officer Williams to go undercover at his cousin Mateo's house, and prove that he is dealing in drugs and guns, and smuggling nuclear materials to terrorists. Raphael quickly admits what is going on to Mateo, who is sharing his home with little-seen housemate Jay, a crackhead squatter named Nestor, and Nestor's crazy girlfriend.

Mateo's home is surrounded by a string of odd characters, including aspiring news reporter Shay Burrata and her timid husband/cameraman Paul; nosey neighbor Jeremy Pillows; a pair of gossiping old women; up-and-coming rapper Pflophaus; and FBI agents Clark and Nelvin, who are keeping tabs on the street from inside a disguised surveillance van. The town is also being menaced by a serial killer who has been chopping off his victim's hands.

While doing community service, Raphael meets Bernadette, a cute goth girl and the pair go shoplifting together. Bernadette says she will be leaving to go to college in Iowa, where her uncle lives.

That night, Jeremy Pilllows calls up Officer Williams and tells her that he saw two men carrying a large black trash bag out of Mateo's house. Williams resolves to investigate, unaware that Pillows is harbouring the serial killer, who is chopping up a man in his kitchen as they speak.

Raphael returns home to find Mateo and Nestor distraught: Jay has hung himself. Raphael persuades Mateo to hide his drugs and call the police, but when he goes up to inspect the body he realises that Jay's hands have been chopped off. Williams arrives and handcuffs and abuses Mateo and Raphi until the rest of the police turn up, free them and humiliate Williams. Mateo goes to the police station for an interview. Jeremy Pillows and his hand-stealing accomplice wave the police off, laughing at how clueless they are.

With Mateo away, Nestor takes control of the house and launches a massive house party full of his Satanist friends. The two gossiping old women turn up to the party, join in the drinking, but report the party to Williams anyway, blaming Mateo, who has just returned from the police station after being questioned all night. Williams employs a heavily tattooed man Panda, to buy drugs and guns from Mateo that night so she can arrest him.

In the FBI van, agents Clark and Nelvin get confirmation that Jeremy Pillows, not Mateo, is the arms dealer, and that nuclear devices will be exchanged at his house that night. As the local PD is useless, they will also be backed up by "a notorious cop and pardoned war criminal" who single-handedly wiped out an Afghan village.

Panda goes to buy from Mateo's place, but recognises Nestor and declines to rat them out. When Williams refuses to give him his money, he stabs her and she shoots him dead. Enraged, Nestor runs out and shoots Williams in the gut while Raphi, Mateo and Bernadette peer from a window. The FBI agents shoot and kill Nestor. With their cover blown, the agents raid Jeremy Pillows' home, but are slain by his goons. The war criminal arrives and kills almost everyone in Jeremy Pillows' home, but Jeremy manages to get the jump on her and guns her down before fleeing. Meanwhile, an injured Williams invades Mateo's home intent on killing him, but Mateo can't bring himself to hurt her. Raphi picks up a knife to defend the group, but before he can attack, Nestor's girlfriend makes a surprise appearance, knocks Williams to the floor and crushes her head with a wrestling move. Paul and Shay Burrata arrive on the scene to film the carnage, and Paul dies of a heart attack.

In the aftermath Raphi, Mateo, and his pet pig Larry leave Pfresno to join Bernadette on her uncle's farm in Iowa.

== Cast ==
- Danielle Evon Ploeger as Officer Williams
- Luke Wilcox as Raphael Tinski
- Darius Autry as Mateo
- Khali Sykes (credited as Khali McDuff-Sykes) as Bernadette
- Ariel Ash as Shay Burrata
- John Ennis as Jeremy Pillows
- Heath Allyn as Agent Clark
- Reynolds Washam as Agent Nelvin
- Brian Villalobos as Paul
- Pineapple Tangoroa as Panda
- Ka5sh as Pflophouse
- Jacob Wysocki as Billy

== Production ==
Rats! was shot in Pflugerville, Texas, a town located near Austin, where co-writer and co-director Carl Fry has lived for the past decade. The story was brought to life in just 16 days with a cast and crew largely based in Austin. The film draws inspiration from the anarchic energy of the Austin 1990s DIY film scene.

== Release and reception ==
=== Festivals ===
Rats! was selected to screen at the following film festivals:

- 2023 Cucalorus Film Festival (Work in Progress Screening)
- 2024 Fantasia Film Festival (World Premiere)
- 2024 Calgary Underground Film Festival
- 2024 New/Next Film Festival
- 2024 Tallahassee Film Festival
- 2024 Seattle International Film Festival
- 2024 Florida Film Festival
- 2024 FogFest Horror Film Festival
- 2024 Saskatoon Fantastic Film Festival
- 2024 Splat! Film Festival
- 2024 Indy Film Fest
- 2024 New Hampshire Film Festival
- 2024 Fantaspoa International Fantastic Film Festival

=== Critical response ===
Rats! received praise for its offbeat and outrageous humor. Dread Central stated that Rats! was “repulsive and crude, but it's also full of heart.” The Houston Chronicle remarked that the film's raw, no-holds-barred approach "boasts a level of exaggerated bad taste that John Waters might admire." The Gauntlet praised the film's tribute to indie cinema, stating that it "serves as a testament to the personal allure of independent cinema," showcasing the unique draw of low-budget filmmaking.
