= Rae Isla =

American singer-songwriter

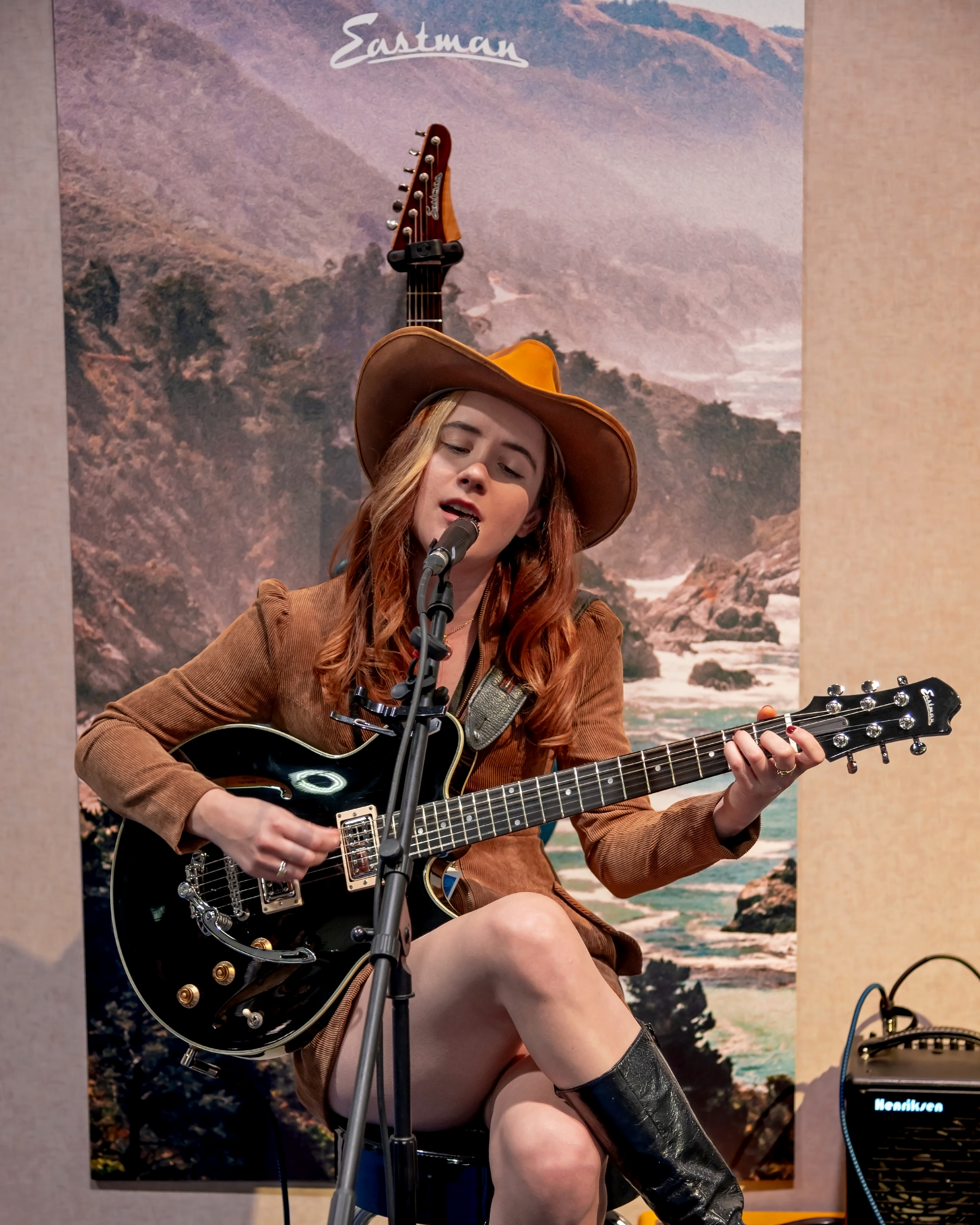
- Isla performing in January 2024
- Born: Bainbridge Island, Washington
- Education: Berklee College of Music
- Occupation: Singer-songwriter
- Years active: 2017 - present
- Website: https://raeisla.com/

Rae Isla is an American singer-songwriter from Bainbridge Island, Washington.

== Early career ==
Isla had early involvement in local arts programs and theater productions. She attended Berklee College of Music before beginning her professional music career in New York City. She performed at venues such as Mercury Lounge and built a following through live performances and early releases. During this period, she released singles including “Just Because,” which received exposure through platforms such as Sofar Sounds and MTV Latin America.

== Music career ==
=== Early releases and Another Life ===
Rae Isla’s debut EP "No Longer Blue" released in 2018 and featured a collaboration with producer Gianluca Buccellati.

Isla’s follow-up singles, including “American Paradise” (2019) and “Lovely Lies” (2021), helped further define her sound, blending introspective lyrics with pop and Americana elements.

She released her debut album Another Life, which featured both songs.

During the COVID-19 pandemic, Isla adapted her creative process to a remote environment, writing and recording music from home while maintaining connections with her audience often through live-streamed performances of her singing outside.

=== Second album: New Frontier ===
In 2024, Isla released her second album, New Frontier, produced with Pablo Valero of the Mexican rock band Santa Sabina

== Film, television, and media work ==
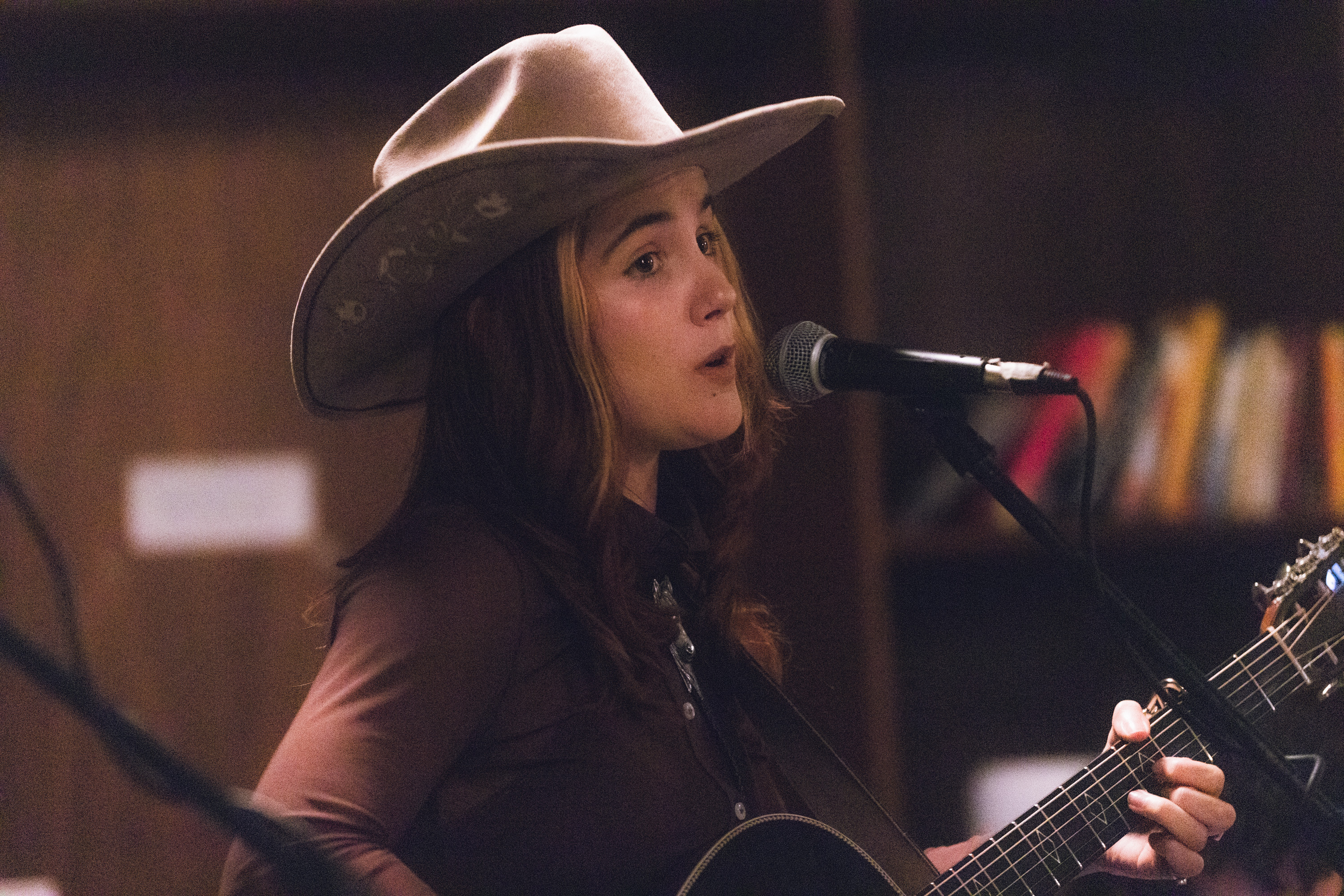
Isla performing at the Breakup Season vinyl soundtrack release party in December 2025

Isla’s music has been featured in film and television projects. She contributed the title song to the soundtrack of Ezra, a 2023 film directed by Tony Goldwyn and starring Robert De Niro.

During the 2023 SAG-AFTRA strike, Isla attended the Toronto International Film Festival in connection with Ezra, where she performed at the film premiere's after party.

Isla’s single “Free to Love” is featured in the trailer for the 2024 film Breakup Season and was included in the film’s vinyl soundtrack release. Isla performed at events in conjunction with the soundtrack’s release in December 2025.

She also contributed the theme song to SCENE: a new docuseries and podcast, exploring the development and cultural history of neighborhoods across the country, starting with the Los Angeles suburb of Silver Lake.

== Bainbridge Island and touring ==
Isla has maintained ties to her hometown of Bainbridge Island, WA. In 2025, she launched an island tour with a hometown performance at the Treehouse Cafe in Lynwood Center.

== Technology and Web3 involvement ==
In addition to her music career, Isla has been an early adopter of blockchain and music NFTs.

Isla has also created projects combining her music with interactive gaming experiences built on the blockchain.

== Discography ==
=== Studio albums ===
- Another Life (2021)
- New Frontier (2024)

=== Selected singles ===
- “American Paradise”
- “Lovely Lies”
- “Just Because”
- “Free to Love”
- “What if I Die Flying Over Oklahoma?”
- “Ezra”
