= Circle Cinema =

Independent movie theater in Tulsa, Oklahoma

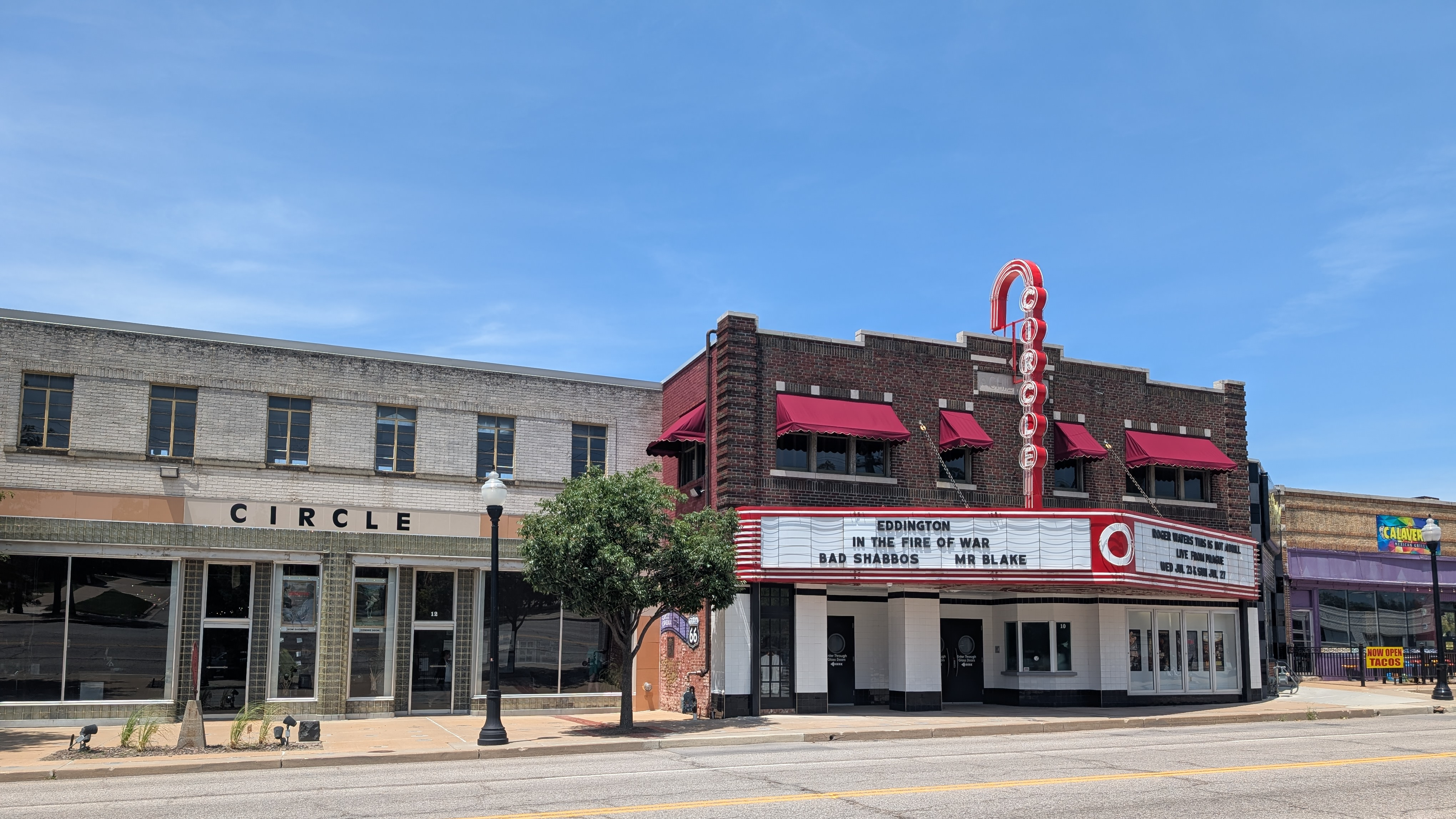
- Interactive map of Circle Cinema
- Address: 10 S Lewis Ave, Tulsa, OK 74104
- Location: Tulsa, Oklahoma

Construction
- Opened: July 15, 1928
- Renovated: 2013

Website
- www.circlecinema.org

Circle Cinema is a non-profit arthouse movie theater located in the Kendall-Whittier neighborhood of Tulsa, Oklahoma, on the corner of Lewis Avenue and Admiral Boulevard. As the city's oldest movie theater, it supports four auditoriums, a concession stand, and an art gallery, as well as a functioning Robert Morton pipe organ and a walk of fame.

The cinema was built in 1928 on the 1926-1932 alignment of U.S. Route 66. It is a cinema hub for Oklahoma's Green Country, serving as a Satellite Screen for the 2021 Sundance Film Festival. It is listed on the National Register of Historic Places.

== History ==
The cinema opened as The Circle Theatre on July 15, 1928, as a single-screen silent picture house. Its opening night show was the Warner Bros. film Across the Pacific.

In 1978, due to a decline in business in the neighborhood, the cinema converted to an adult movie theater under the name The New Circle Theater. In the late 1980s, the theater reopened as Cine Centro with a focus on Hispanic-language films.

The building was featured in the opening scene of the 1983 Francis Ford Coppola film The Outsiders, based on the S.E. Hinton book The Outsiders.

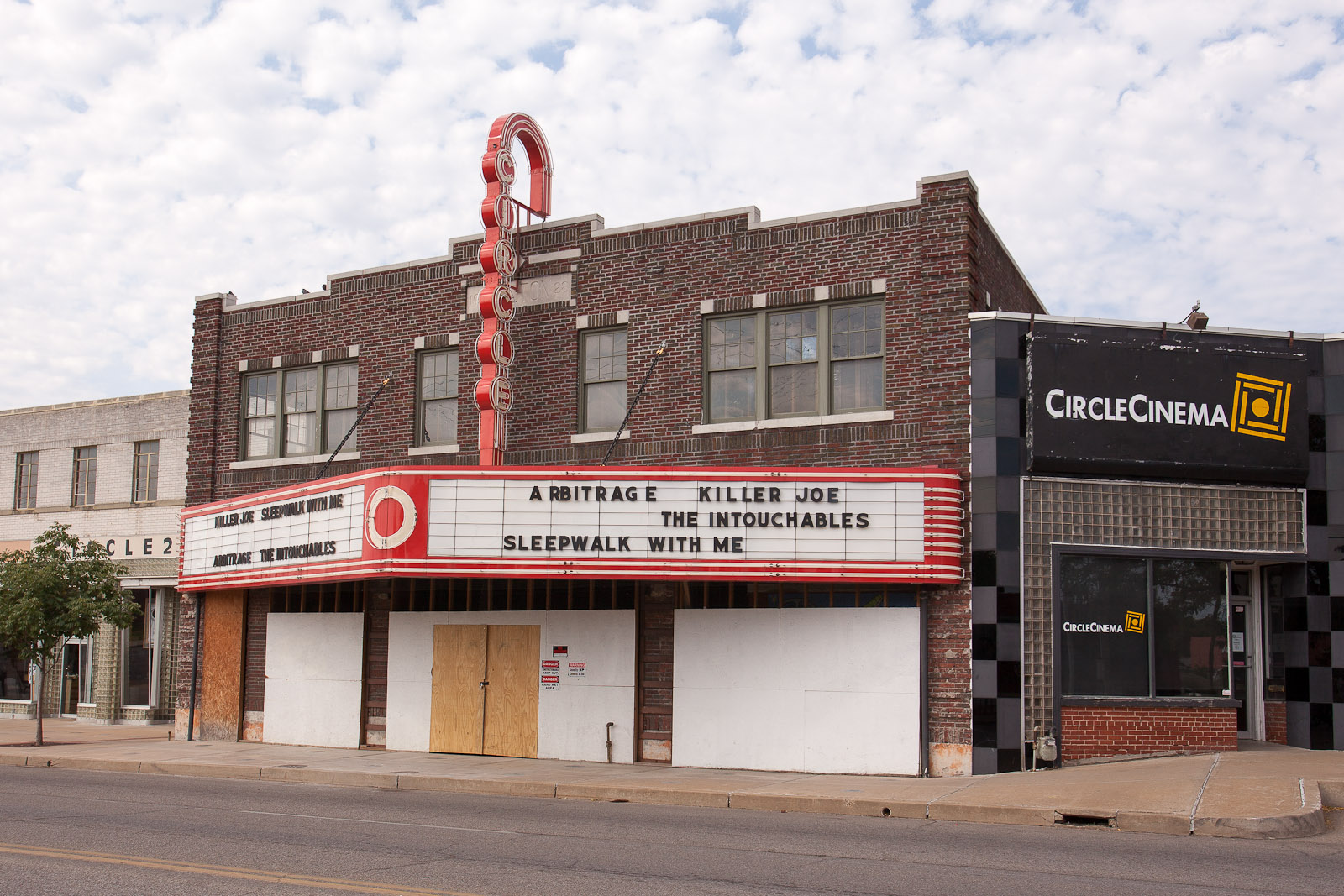
Circle Cinema during its renovation in September 2012

In the Mid-1990s, the theater closed and remained dormant for a decade until it was reopened in October 2004 as Circle Cinema by the non-profit The Circle Cinema Foundation, which continues to operate it today.

After many years of fundraising and renovations, the restoration project was completed and the cinema celebrated its grand re-opening on July 15, 2013, its 85th anniversary.

== Operation ==
The cinema is open year-round and seats a total of 800 patrons in all four theaters. The programming is a mix of first-run art, independent, and foreign films as well as event repertory screenings. The theaters are equipped with high-quality digital projection, and its main theater is equipped to operate 35mm prints.

In addition to cinema operations, the Circle Cinema Foundation runs an annual youth film camp and a local film festival.

The exterior has a renovated neon sign and neon-lit marquee in reference to the cinema's former 1952 appearance. On the front sidewalk is an Oklahoma Walk of Fame featuring the likes of Will Rogers, Hoot Gibson, Tim Blake Nelson, Kristin Chenoweth, and Sterlin Harjo as well as a commemorative plaque from The Outsiders House Museum dedicated by Danny Boy O'Connor and Tulsa mayor G.T. Bynum in 2021.
