= Carly Stewart =

American actress

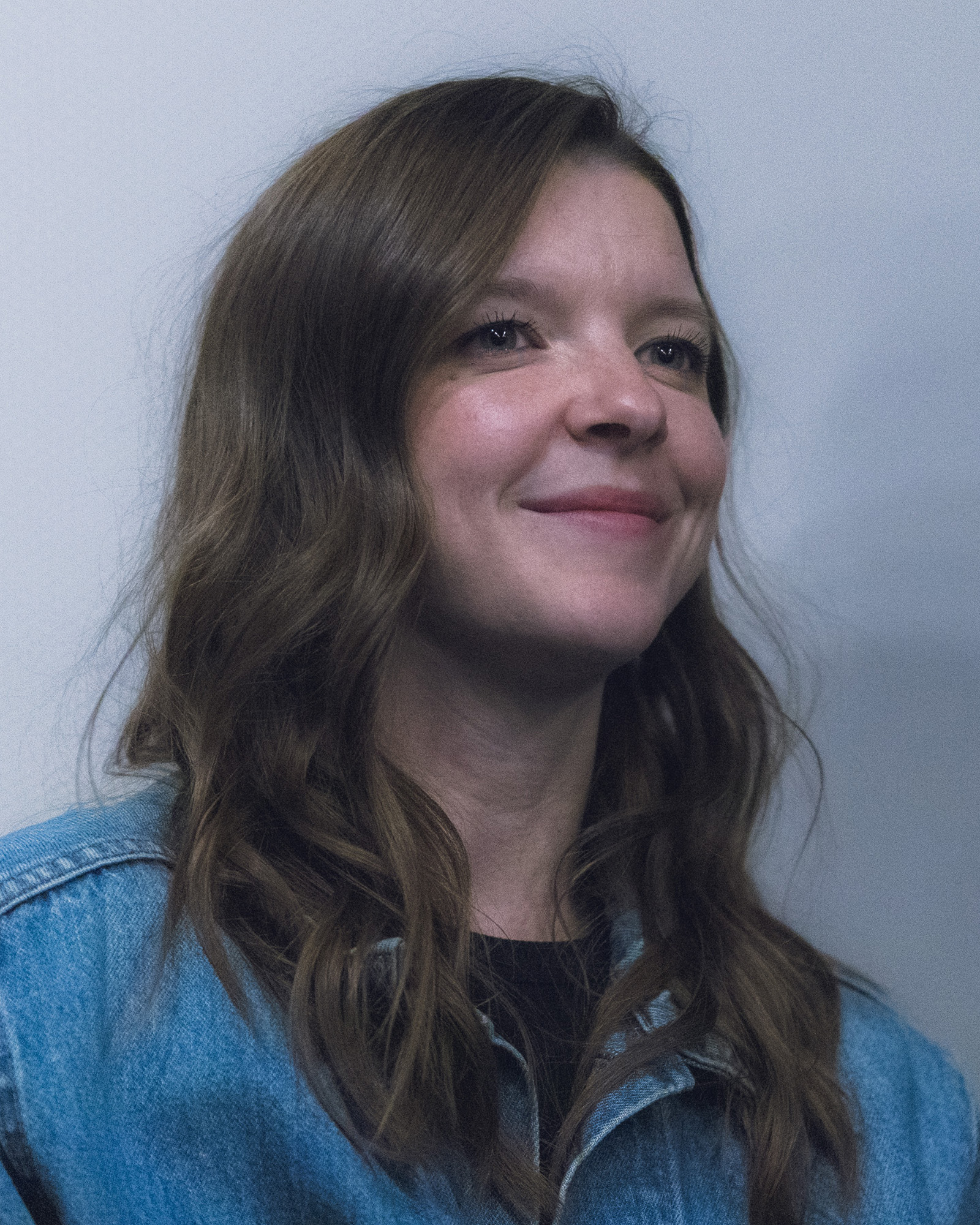
- Stewart at a Q&A for Breakup Season in 2024
- Born: Sedro-Woolley, Washington, U.S.
- Education: Eastern Washington University
- Occupation: Film/Television Actress
- Years active: 2018 - present

Carly Stewart is an American actress. She made her feature debut in the independent feature film Breakup Season (2024). In that film she played Liz Russell, the younger sister of protagonist Ben Russell (Chandler Riggs).

== Early life ==
Stewart grew up in Mount Vernon, Washington, and got into theatre at the age of 6. She performed in numerous shows at the Lincoln Theatre. For college, she attended Eastern Washington University.

== Career ==
Stewart has appeared in multiple short films, starting with Haunt (2018).

In 2024, Stewart made her feature film debut in Breakup Season, an independent film shot in La Grande, Oregon. The film played at 39 film festivals before being released in November 2024. For her work in the movie, Stewart received the award for Best Supporting Actress at the 2024 Blue Whiskey Independent Film Festival in Chicago, Illinois.

In 2025, Stewart became attached to Erie, a horror film from writer-director Alison-Eve Hammersley. Hammersley previously directed Stewart in the short film Fragile.com (2019).

== Filmography ==
=== Feature Films ===
- Breakup Season (2024)
- Erie (TBD)

=== Short Films ===
- Haunt (2018)
- Fragile.com (2019)
- Uncradled (2022)
