= Samantha Isler =

American actress (born 1998)

- Born: October 26, 1998 (age 27)
- Other name: Sami Isler
- Occupation: Actress
- Years active: 2009–present

Samantha Isler (born October 26, 1998) is an American actress. She starred as Ellie in the NBC sitcom Sean Saves the World. Isler started her career in 2009, where she took part in NBC's Today as a kid reporter. She then played the role of teenage Amara/The Darkness on The CW series Supernatural.

== Filmography ==
=== Film ===
Year	Title	Role	Notes
2012	No One Knows	Hannah	Short
2013	Home Run	Kendricks	
2014	Dig Two Graves	Jake Mather	
2016	Captain Fantastic	Kielyr Cash	
2017	Molly's Game	Molly Bloom (age 13-15)	
2024	Breakup Season	Cassie	

=== Television ===
Year	Title	Role	Notes
2009	NBC’s Today	kid reporter	
2013–14	Sean Saves the World	Ellie Harrison	Main role
2015	Supernatural	Amara (teen)	"Our Little World"
2016	Grey's Anatomy	Maya Roberts	"All I Want Is You"
