= Jacob Wysocki =

American actor and comedian (born 1990)

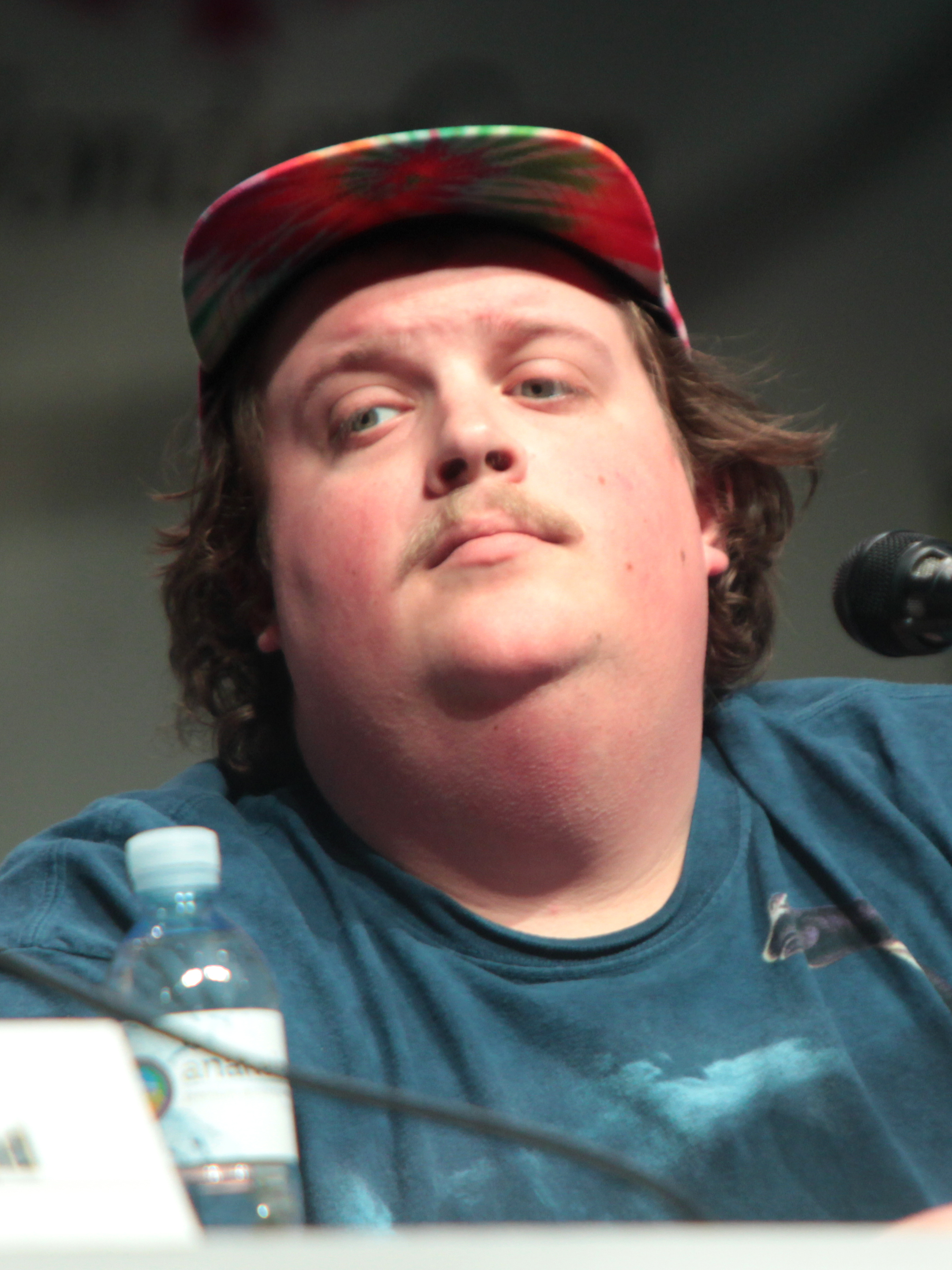
- Wysocki at WonderCon 2015
- Born: June 20, 1990 (age 36); Lomita, California, U.S.
- Education: El Camino College
- Occupations: Actor, comedian
- Years active: 2010–present

Jacob Wysocki (/waɪˈsɒki/ wy-SOK-ee; born June 20, 1990) is an American actor and comedian.

== Life and career ==
Wysocki is an only child. He became interested in acting while attending Narbonne High School, joining in school plays as well as performing with ComedySportz. After graduating high school in 2008, Wysocki went on to earn an English degree from El Camino College while continuing to perform improv, eventually leading to him being scouted as Dante Piznarski in the ABC Family drama series Huge.

He took his first leading role in 2011 alongside John C. Reilly in the dramedy Terri, which was shown at the 2011 Sundance Film Festival. In 2014, he starred in the horror movie Unfriended. Since 2022, Wysocki has appeared in multiple productions on the streaming service Dropout.

Wysocki is also a member of the improv group Yeti, and he has appeared on various podcasts, including Rotating Heroes, Improv 4 Humans, Get Played, Chillumanati, Artists on Artists on Artists on Artists, ManDogPod, Expo Exposé, Comedy Bang! Bang!, Best Friends, Hello From the Magic Tavern, and his own podcast I Don't Want To Talk About Fight Club Anymore.

== Filmography ==
=== Film ===
Year	Title	Role	Notes
2009	Jack's Box	Jacob	Short film
2010	Sandland: Episode 1 - Summer's Kiss	Lacksee	Short film
2011	Terri	Terri Thompson	
2011	Lend Me a Whale	Jacob	Short film
2012	Fat Kid Rules the World	Troy	
2012	Pitch Perfect	Justin	
2013	Nsfw	"Kayla"	Short film
2014	Unfriended	Ken Smith	
2016	Neighbors 2: Sorority Rising	Live Tinder Guy	
2016	Schlep	Jacob	
2016	Good Crazy	Jacob	Short film
2018	An Evening with Beverly Luff Linn	Lawrence Doggi	
2018	Please Stand By	Male Nurse	
2018	Funny Story	Tyler	
2020	Sales Ready	Alister	Short film
2023	Shadow Brother Sunday		Short film
2024	Tunnel Rave	Nathan	Short film
2024	Breakup Season	Gordon	
2024	Rats!	Billy	
2025	Trigger Happy		

=== Television ===
Year	Title	Role(s)	Notes
2010	Huge	Dante Piznarski	Main role; 10 episodes
2013	Glee	Electra's D.P.	Episode: "Naked"
2013	Super Fun Night	MC	Episode: "Anything for Love"
2014	Interns	Jacob	Television mini-series; 13 episodes
2015	Residents Advisors	Charles	Recurring role; 3 episodes
2015	Key & Peele	Improv #2	Episode: "A Cappella Club"
2016	Comedy Bang! Bang!	Son	Episode: "Kevin Bacon Wears a Blue Button Down Shirt and Brown Boots"
2016–2018	Loosely Exactly Nicole	Devin	Recurring role (season 1); main role (season 2)
2017	I'm Dying Up Here	Male Heckler	Episode: "Pilot"
2019	Apocalypse Goals	Diesel	Episode: "TFW Your Ex Won't Let Go..."
2021	Superstore	Frisco	Episode: "Biscuit"
2026	The Rookie	Himself	Episode: "Fun and Games"

=== Web series ===
Year	Title	Role(s)	Notes
2016	Quality Sketch		Episode: "Mid-Century Modern Family"
2016	CollegeHumor Originals	Brad / Hippie Guy	Guest roles; 2 episodes
2017	The UCB Show	Actor	Episode: "Twenty GIFs of Gifts"
2022–present	Make Some Noise	Himself	6 episodes
2022–present	Game Changer	Himself	8 episodes
2024-2026	Very Important People	Zonton de la Doll; Hayes Steele; Ollie	3 episodes
2024	Dimension 20 — Never Stop Blowing Up	Andy "Dang" Lightfoot / Greg Stocks	Main role; 10 episodes
2025	Adventuring Academy	Himself	Season 6, episode 3: "Normal People Worry Me (with Jacob Wysocki)"
2026	Dimension 20 — Gladlands	Kokomo	Main role; 6 episodes

== Awards and nominations ==
Year	Award	Category	Work	Result
2011	Gotham Independent Film Awards	Breakthrough Actor	Terri	Nominated
2024	North Idaho Film Festival	Best Actor in a Feature Film	Breakup Season	Won
