= List of Miramax films =

This is a selected list of feature films originally released and/or distributed by Miramax. Dates are US release dates.

== 1980s ==
Release date	Title	Notes
November 26, 1980	Rockshow (Note: Owned by MPL Communications, with distribution rights currently licensed to Eagle Rock Entertainment)	
May 8, 1981	The Burning	distributed by Filmways (Orion Pictures took over early in its theatrical run)
December 11, 1981	Spaced Out	
May 21, 1982	The Secret Policeman's Other Ball	US version
December 23, 1983	Ziggy Stardust and the Spiders from Mars (Note: Owned by Rhino Entertainment)	US distribution with 20th Century Fox
April 27, 1984	Eréndira	Nominated - Palme d'Or
June 3, 1984	Édith et Marcel	
August 23, 1985	Crossover Dreams	
October 25, 1985	The Dog Who Stopped the War	
March 14, 1986	Cool Change	
May 1, 1986	The Quest	
September 26, 1986	Twist and Shout	
October 3, 1986	Playing for Keeps	distributed by Universal Pictures
February 27, 1987	Working Girls (Note: Owned by its director Lizzie Borden, with U.S. distribution rights currently licensed to Janus Films and The Criterion Collection)	North American distribution only Nominated - Grand Jury Prize Dramatic
March 27, 1987	Ghost Fever	
September 11, 1987	I've Heard the Mermaids Singing (Note: Owned by Film Associates International, with North American distribution rights currently licensed to Kino Lorber)	Nominated - Genie Award for Best Motion Picture
December 11, 1987	Crazy Moon	
December 22, 1987	The Magic Snowman	US distribution only
January 22, 1988	The Grand Highway	Nominated - César Award for Best Film
January 29, 1988	Light Years	
March 18, 1988	Aria (Note: Owned by Lightyear Entertainment)	Nominated - Palme d'Or
May 7, 1988	Riders of the Storm	
May 20, 1988	Caribe	
June 10, 1988	The Land of Faraway	
June 17, 1988	Going Undercover	
August 25, 1988	The Thin Blue Line (Note: Owned by IFC Films)	distribution only National Board of Review Award for Best Documentary Film; Nominated - Independent Spirit Award for Best Feature; Inducted into the National Film Registry in 2001
September 23, 1988	Murder One	
December 2, 1988	Dakota	
December 21, 1988	Pelle the Conqueror (Note: Owned by Film Movement)	US distribution only Academy Award for Best Foreign Language Film; Bodil Award for Best Danish Film; Golden Globe Award for Best Foreign Language Film; Palme d'Or; Nominated - BAFTA Award for Best Film Not in the English Language; Nominated - European Film Award for Best Film
March 31, 1989	Warm Nights on a Slow Moving Train	
March 31, 1989	Edge of Sanity (Note: Owned by MGM (via Orion Pictures))	first film released under Millimeter Films label
April 28, 1989	Scandal	North American distribution only
May 12, 1989	The Return of Swamp Thing	released under Millimeter Films label
August 4, 1989	Sex, Lies, and Videotape (Note: Owned by Sony Pictures)	North American distribution only Independent Spirit Award for Best Feature; Palme d'Or; Nominated - César Award for Best Foreign Film; Inducted into the National Film Registry in 2006
August 25, 1989	The Little Thief	
September 29, 1989	The Girl in a Swing (Note: Owned by Astrablu Media)	released under Millimeter Films label
October 27, 1989	Animal Behavior	released under Millimeter Films label
November 3, 1989	Stepfather II (Note: Owned by Shout! Studios)	released under Millimeter Films label
November 10, 1989	My Left Foot	US distribution only; produced by Granada Television; Independent Spirit Award for Best International Film; Nominated - Academy Award for Best Picture; Nominated - BAFTA Award for Best Film

== 1990s ==
Release date	Title	Notes
January 26, 1990	Strike It Rich	released under Millimeter Films label
February 9, 1990	Torrents of Spring	released under Millimeter Films label Nominated - Palme d'Or
February 23, 1990	Cinema Paradiso	U.S. distribution only Academy Award for Best Foreign Language Film; BAFTA Award for Best Film Not in the English Language; Grand Prix (Cannes Film Festival); Golden Globe Award for Best Foreign Language Film; Nominated - César Award for Best Foreign Film; Nominated - David di Donatello for Best Film
April 6, 1990	The Cook, the Thief, His Wife & Her Lover (Note: Owned by Focus Features)	U.S. distribution only
April 13, 1990	Mama, There's a Man in Your Bed	
May 4, 1990	Tie Me Up! Tie Me Down! (Note: Owned by Pathé)	U.S. distribution only Nominated - César Award for Best Foreign Film; Nominated - Golden Bear
May 18, 1990	Strapless	
May 25, 1990	King of the Wind	U.S. distribution only
July 20, 1990	The Unbelievable Truth	
August 31, 1990	The Lemon Sisters	
September 14, 1990	Hardware (Note: Co-owned by Severin Films)	co-production with Palace Pictures, released under Millimeter Films label
September 21, 1990	The Tall Guy	U.S. distribution only
October 26, 1990	The Nasty Girl	U.S. distribution only BAFTA Award for Best Film Not in the English Language; Nominated - Academy Award for Best Foreign Language Film; Nominated - Golden Bear; Nominated - Golden Globe Award for Best Foreign Language Film
November 9, 1990	The Krays	U.S. distribution only
November 23, 1990	Mr. & Mrs. Bridge	distribution only
December 5, 1990	The Grifters	Independent Spirit Award for Best Feature
December 21, 1990	The Long Walk Home	
February 8, 1991	¡Ay Carmela!	released under Prestige Films label Goya Award for Best Film; Nominated - European Film Award for Best Film
March 6, 1991	Ju Dou	U.S. distribution only Nominated - Academy Award for Best Foreign Language Film; Nominated - Palme d'Or
March 13, 1991	Paris Is Burning (Note: Owned by its director Jennie Livingston and Vogling Films LLC, with North American distribution rights currently licensed to Janus Films and The Criterion Collection)	released under Prestige Films label Grand Jury Prize Documentary (tied with American Dream); Inducted into the National Film Registry in 2016
April 26, 1991	Dancin' Thru the Dark	distribution
April 26, 1991	Drowning by Numbers (Note: Owned by Severin Films)	distribution only, released under Prestige Films label
April 26, 1991	Journey of Hope	U.S. distribution only Academy Award for Best Foreign Language Film
May 1, 1991	Harley	released under Millimeter Films label
May 3, 1991	A Rage in Harlem	US distribution; co-production with Palace Pictures.
May 17, 1991	Auntie Danielle	released under Prestige Films label
May 24, 1991	Madonna: Truth or Dare	U.S. distribution only
May 31, 1991	Ambition	
May 31, 1991	Everybody's Fine	U.S. distribution only Nominated - Palme d'Or
June 28, 1991	The Reflecting Skin	released under Prestige Films label
July 3, 1991	The Miracle	released under Prestige Films label
July 26, 1991	Bullet in the Head	
August 2, 1991	Voyeur	released under Prestige Films label
August 9, 1991	Crossing the Line	US distribution only
August 14, 1991	Iron & Silk	released under Prestige Films label
August 23, 1991	Pastime	
August 23, 1991	Uranus	released under Prestige Films label
August 30, 1991	The Pope Must Die	co-production with Channel Four Films and Palace Pictures
October 11, 1991	Antonia and Jane	
October 30, 1991	Exposure	U.S. distribution only
November 15, 1991	Kafka	
November 15, 1991	Prospero's Books	distribution only
November 22, 1991	The Double Life of Veronique (Note: Owned by RLJE Films)	U.S. distribution only Nominated - Golden Globe Award for Best Foreign Language Film; Nominated - Independent Spirit Award for Best International Film; Nominated - Palme d'Or
December 5, 1991	Black Rainbow	
December 6, 1991	Young Soul Rebels (Note: Owned by the British Film Institute, with U.S. distribution rights currently licensed to Strand Releasing)	released under Prestige Films label
December 20, 1991	High Heels (Note: Owned by Sony Pictures (via Sony Pictures Classics))	U.S. distribution only César Award for Best Foreign Film; Nominated - Golden Globe Award for Best Foreign Language Film
December 27, 1991	Hear My Song	
January 24, 1992	Love Crimes	
March 18, 1992	American Dream (Note: Owned by Cargo Films)	released under Prestige Films label Academy Award for Best Documentary Feature; Grand Jury Prize Documentary (tied with Paris is Burning)
March 22, 1992	Mediterraneo	distribution only Academy Award for Best Foreign Language Film; David di Donatello for Best Film
April 3, 1992	Delicatessen (Note: Owned by StudioCanal with Lionsgate handling U.S. distribution)	North American distribution only Nominated - BAFTA Award for Best Film Not in the English Language
May 1, 1992	K2 (Note: Owned by Paramount Pictures)	co-production with Paramount Pictures
May 22, 1992	Zentropa	released under Prestige Films label
June 26, 1992	Incident at Oglala	
July 31, 1992	Enchanted April	distribution only Nominated - Golden Globe Award for Best Motion Picture - Musical or Comedy
August 14, 1992	Johnny Suede	
August 28, 1992	Freddie as F.R.O.7	U.S. distribution only; produced by Hollywood Road Films
September 4, 1992	Bob Roberts (Note: Owned by Lionsgate in the U.S. and Universal Pictures internationally)	co-distribution with Paramount Pictures, PolyGram Filmed Entertainment, LIVE Entertainment and Working Title Films
September 18, 1992	Sarafina!	co-production with Hollywood Pictures
October 9, 1992	Breaking the Rules	
October 23, 1992	Reservoir Dogs (Note: Owned by Lionsgate)	US theatrical distribution only; produced by LIVE America
October 30, 1992	Close to Eden	European Film Award for Best Film; Golden Lion; Nominated - Academy Award for Best Foreign Language Film; Nominated - César Award for Best Foreign Film; Nominated - Golden Globe Award for Best Foreign Language Film; Nominated - Independent Spirit Award for Best International Film; Nominated - Nika Award for Best Picture
October 30, 1992	Rampage	
November 6, 1992	The Efficiency Expert	Nominated - AACTA Award for Best Film
November 6, 1992	Sumo Do, Sumo Don't	U.S. distribution only Japan Academy Film Prize for Picture of the Year
November 25, 1992	The Crying Game	distribution only; co-production with Palace Pictures and Channel Four Films; BAFTA Award for Outstanding British Film; Independent Spirit Award for Best International Film; Producers Guild of America Award for Best Theatrical Motion Picture; Nominated - Academy Award for Best Picture; Nominated - David di Donatello for Best Foreign Film; Nominated - Golden Globe Award for Best Motion Picture - Drama; Nominated - Goya Award for Best European Film
December 11, 1992	Passion Fish (Note: Owned by Sony Pictures (via Columbia Pictures); some distribution rights are also currently licensed to Samuel Goldwyn Films)	North American theatrical and television distribution only
February 12, 1993	Strictly Ballroom	AACTA Award for Best Film; Toronto International Film Festival People's Choice Award; Nominated - BAFTA Award for Best Film; Nominated - Golden Globe Award for Best Motion Picture - Musical or Comedy
February 17, 1993	Like Water for Chocolate	North American distribution only Ariel Award for Best Picture; Nominated - Golden Globe Award for Best Foreign Language Film; Nominated - Independent Spirit Award for Best International Film
March 12, 1993	Ethan Frome	
March 19, 1993	Just Another Girl on the I.R.T.	Nominated - Grand Jury Prize Dramatic
March 26, 1993	The Opposite Sex and How to Live with Them	
April 23, 1993	Map of the Human Heart	U.S. distribution only Nominated - AACTA Award for Best Film
April 30, 1993	The Night We Never Met	
June 25, 1993	House of Cards	distribution pickup from Penta Pictures
July 16, 1993	Benefit of the Doubt	first film to be released by Miramax during their Disney tenure
July 30, 1993	Tom and Jerry: The Movie (Note: Owned by Warner Bros. (via Turner Entertainment Co.))	North American distribution only; produced by Turner Entertainment Co. and Film Roman; distributed by Turner Pictures outside of the US
August 13, 1993	Especially on Sunday	distribution; co-production with Intérmedias, Titanus, Paradis Films, Basic Cinematografica and Dusk Motion Pictures
August 20, 1993	El Cid (Note: After the Weinsteins' departure from Miramax in 2006, El Cid was issued for the first time on DVD in late January 2008 by The Weinstein Company as part of "The Miriam Collection" and an HD remaster was made available for the month of January 2014 on DirecTV Cinema. Following the closure of TWC, the film's distribution rights are presumably owned by either Spyglass Media Group or Lionsgate.)	re-release
September 17, 1993	Into the West	distribution only
October 15, 1993	Farewell My Concubine	distribution in English-speaking territories only BAFTA Award for Best Film Not in the English Language; Golden Globe Award for Best Foreign Language Film; National Board of Review Award for Best Foreign Language Film; Palme d'Or (tied with The Piano); Nominated - Academy Award for Best Foreign Language Film; Nominated - César Award for Best Foreign Film
October 29, 1993	Deception	
November 17, 1993	The Piano	North American, Australian, New Zealand and Scandinavian distribution only; produced by Ciby 2000; AACTA Award for Best Film; Bodil Award for Best Non-American Film; César Award for Best Foreign Film; Independent Spirit Award for Best International Film; Palme d'Or (tied with Farewell My Concubine); Nominated - Academy Award for Best Picture; Nominated - BAFTA Award for Best Film; Nominated - Golden Globe Award for Best Motion Picture - Drama
December 3, 1993	The Snapper	Toronto International Film Festival People's Choice Award; Nominated - César Award for Best Foreign Film
December 5, 1993	Three Colours: Blue (Note: Owned by mk2 Films, with U.S. distribution rights currently licensed to Janus Films and The Criterion Collection)	U.S. distribution only Golden Lion (tied with Short Cuts); Goya Award for Best European Film; Nominated - Golden Globe Award for Best Foreign Language Film
February 18, 1994	Three Colours: White	U.S. distribution only Nominated - European Film Award for Best Film; Nominated - Golden Bear
April 1, 1994	The House of the Spirits	North American distribution only
May 23, 1994	Desperate Remedies	
May 25, 1994	Little Buddha	distribution only
July 15, 1994	Ciao, Professore!	distribution only
August 24, 1994	Fresh	Nominated- Grand Jury Prize Dramatic
August 24, 1994	The Advocate	North American distribution only
October 14, 1994	Pulp Fiction	David di Donatello for Best Foreign Film; Independent Spirit Award for Best Feature; Palme d'Or; National Board of Review Award for Best Film (tied with Forrest Gump); Nominated - Academy Award for Best Picture; Nominated - BAFTA Award for Best Film; Nominated - César Award for Best Foreign Film; Nominated - Golden Globe Award for Best Motion Picture - Drama; Inducted into the National Film Registry in 2013
October 19, 1994	Clerks	distribution only; produced by View Askew Productions; Nominated - Grand Jury Prize Dramatic; Inducted into the National Film Registry in 2019
October 21, 1994	Bullets Over Broadway (Note: Owned by WestEnd Films, with U.S. distribution handled by Quiver Distribution)	distribution only; produced by Sweetland Films; Nominated - Independent Spirit Award for Best Feature
November 3, 1994	Sirens	
November 16, 1994	Heavenly Creatures	Silver Lion; Nominated - AACTA Award for Best Foreign Film; Nominated - Golden Lion
November 23, 1994	Mrs. Parker and the Vicious Circle	international distribution only
November 25, 1994	Camilla	U.S. and French distribution only
December 2, 1994	Tom & Viv (Note: Owned by Samuel Goldwyn Films)	
December 9, 1994	Queen Margot (Note: Owned by Cohen Film Group)	
December 25, 1994	Ready to Wear	
December 25, 1994	Three Colours: Red	U.S. distribution only Bodil Award for Best European Film; Independent Spirit Award for Best International Film; Nominated - BAFTA Award for Best Film Not in the English Language; Nominated - César Award for Best Film; Nominated - Palme d'Or
January 20, 1995	Strawberry and Chocolate	North American distribution only Goya Award for Best Spanish Language Foreign Film; Nominated - Academy Award for Best Foreign Language Film
January 21, 1995	Rumble in the Bronx	International distribution only
February 17, 1995	Through the Olive Trees	distribution only Nominated - Independent Spirit Award for Best International Film; Nominated - Palme d'Or
February 24, 1995	Federal Hill	
March 3, 1995	Exotica (Note: Owned by Ego Film Arts)	U.S. distribution only Genie Award for Best Motion Picture; Nominated - Independent Spirit Award for Best International Film
March 10, 1995	Muriel's Wedding (Note: Co-owned by TF1 Studio, with distribution rights outside the U.S. licensed to multiple parties, including Signature Entertainment for SVOD and AVOD in the U.K., Ireland, Australia and New Zealand and Altitude Film Distribution for all other media in the U.K. and Ireland)	U.S. and select international distribution only AACTA Award for Best Film
March 24, 1995	Priest	North American distribution only Toronto International Film Festival People's Choice Award; Nominated - BAFTA Award for Outstanding British Film
May 5, 1995	Picture Bride	distribution outside Japan only
May 12, 1995	The Englishman Who Went up a Hill but Came down a Mountain (Note: International rights retained by Disney (via Buena Vista International))	
May 12, 1995	Gordy	
June 2, 1995	The Glass Shield	
June 9, 1995	Smoke	Bodil Award for Best American Film; Silver Bear Grand Jury Prize; Nominated - César Award for Best Foreign Film; Nominated - David di Donatello for Best Foreign Film; Nominated - Golden Bear
June 14, 1995	Il Postino: The Postman	distribution outside Italy only BAFTA Award for Best Film Not in the English Language; Nominated - Academy Award for Best Picture; Nominated - César Award for Best Foreign Film; Nominated - David di Donatello for Best Film
June 28, 1995	Belle de Jour	re-release under the Miramax Zoë label
July 7, 1995	The Crude Oasis	
July 12, 1995	Grosse Fatigue	distribution only Nominated - Palme d'Or
July 28, 1995	Country Life	
August 11, 1995	Unzipped (Note: North American distribution rights currently owned by Janus Films)	
August 25, 1995	The Thief and the Cobbler	distribution only; theatrically known as Arabian Knight
September 1, 1995	The Innocent	North American distribution only; co-production with Island World
September 22, 1995	A Month by the Lake	
October 6, 1995	The Horseman on the Roof	release under the Miramax Zoë label Nominated - César Award for Best Film
October 13, 1995	Blue in the Face	
October 27, 1995	Mighty Aphrodite	distribution only; produced by Sweetland Films; Nominated - David di Donatello for Best Foreign Film
November 9, 1995	The Star Maker	Grand Jury Prize (Venice Film Festival); Nominated - Academy Award for Best Foreign Language Film; Nominated - David di Donatello for Best Film; Nominated - Golden Lion
November 16, 1995	The Crossing Guard	
November 22, 1995	Two Bits	North American distribution only
December 1, 1995	Things to Do in Denver When You're Dead	
December 8, 1995	Georgia	North American distribution only; produced by Ciby 2000
December 15, 1995	Cry, the Beloved Country	North American distribution only
December 25, 1995	Four Rooms	co-production with A Band Apart
December 29, 1995	Restoration	Nominated - Golden Bear
January 12, 1996	Don't Be a Menace to South Central While Drinking Your Juice in the Hood	co-production with Island Pictures
January 19, 1996	French Twist	release under the Miramax Zoë label Nominated - César Award for Best Film; Nominated - Golden Globe Award for Best Foreign Language Film; Nominated - GLAAD Media Award for Outstanding Film - Limited Release
January 26, 1996	The Journey of August King	
February 2, 1996	The NeverEnding Story III: Escape from Fantasia	U.S. distribution only; produced by CineVox Entertainment, Studio Babelsberg and Dieter Geissler Filmproduktion
February 9, 1996	Beautiful Girls	
March 8, 1996	Chungking Express	released under the Rolling Thunder Pictures label Hong Kong Film Award for Best Film
March 22, 1996	Flirting with Disaster	
April 3, 1996	Faithful	co-production with New Line Cinema, Price Entertainment and Savoy Pictures
April 12, 1996	Jane Eyre	
April 26, 1996	The Stendhal Syndrome	distribution only
May 3, 1996	Captives	
May 3, 1996	The Pallbearer	
May 10, 1996	Dead Man (Note: Owned by Cinesthesia Productions, with U.S. distribution rights currently licensed to Janus Films and The Criterion Collection)	North American distribution only Nominated - Independent Spirit Award for Best Feature; Nominated - Palme d'Or
May 10, 1996	Of Love and Shadows	distribution
May 18, 1996	Norma Jean & Marilyn	International distribution only; US and Canada distribution by HBO Pictures
June 28, 1996	Purple Noon	re-release under the Miramax Zoë label
July 14, 1996	The Visitors	U.S. distribution under Miramax Zoë only; produced by Gaumont, France 3 Cinéma, Alplles Productions and Amigo Productions
July 17, 1996	Walking and Talking	co-production with PolyGram Filmed Entertainment, Channel Four Films, Zenith Productions, Pandora Film, Mikado Films (France), Electric, TEAM Communications Group and Good Machine
July 19, 1996	Trainspotting	North American distribution only; produced by Channel Four Films and the Noel Gay Picture Company; Bodil Award for Best Non-American Film; Nominated - BAFTA Award for Outstanding British Film; Nominated - Independent Spirit Award for Best International Film
July 26, 1996	Billy's Holiday	
August 2, 1996	Emma	
August 9, 1996	Basquiat (Note: Owned by Brant Industries, with distribution rights currently licensed to Janus Films and the Criterion Collection)	distribution outside Japan and Korea only
September 27, 1996	Curdled	co-production with A Band Apart
October 9, 1996	Microcosmos	
October 11, 1996	Hard Core Logo	
October 18, 1996	Swingers	
November 15, 1996	Miracle at Oxford	
November 22, 1996	Ridicule	release under the Miramax Zoë label only BAFTA Award for Best Film Not in the English Language; César Award for Best Film; David di Donatello for Best Foreign Film; National Board of Review Award for Best Foreign Language Film; Nominated - Academy Award for Best Foreign Language Film; Nominated - Golden Globe Award for Best Foreign Language Film; Nominated - Palme d'Or; Nominated - Satellite Award for Best Foreign Language Film
November 27, 1996	Sling Blade (Note: Co-owned by Larry Meistrich)	co-production with The Shooting Gallery
December 6, 1996	The English Patient (Note: Co-owned by Teatro della Pace Films)	Academy Award for Best Picture; BAFTA Award for Best Film; Golden Globe Award for Best Motion Picture - Drama; Nominated - César Award for Best Foreign Film; Nominated - European Film Award for Best Film; Nominated - Golden Bear; Nominated - Goya Award for Best European Film
December 6, 1996	Everyone Says I Love You	
December 13, 1996	Citizen Ruth	
December 13, 1996	Victory	
December 18, 1996	Marvin's Room	
January 3, 1997	Shine	select international distribution only AACTA Award for Best Film; National Board of Review Award for Best Film; Toronto International Film Festival People's Choice Award; Nominated - Academy Award for Best Picture; Nominated - BAFTA Award for Best Film; Nominated - Critics' Choice Movie Award for Best Picture; Nominated - Golden Globe Award for Best Motion Picture - Drama; Nominated - Japan Academy Film Prize for Outstanding Foreign Language Film; Nominated - Satellite Award for Best Film - Drama
January 17, 1997	Albino Alligator	North American distribution only
January 24, 1997	Kolya	North American and select international distribution only Academy Award for Best Foreign Language Film; Czech Lion Award for Best Film; Golden Globe Award for Best Foreign Language Film; Nominated - BAFTA Award for Best Film Not in the English Language; Nominated - European Film Award for Best Film; Nominated - Satellite Award for Best Foreign Language Film
February 14, 1997	Unhook the Stars	
March 5, 1997	Rhyme & Reason	
March 14, 1997	The Substance of Fire	
April 4, 1997	Chasing Amy	co-production with View Askew Productions; Nominated - Independent Spirit Award for Best Feature
April 11, 1997	Cosi	
April 30, 1997	Children of the Revolution	
May 23, 1997	Addicted to Love	studio credit only; co-production with Outlaw Productions, distributed by Warner Bros. Pictures
May 23, 1997	Brassed Off	co-production with Channel Four Films
June 6, 1997	Squeeze	
June 12, 1997	Robinson Crusoe	
June 13, 1997	Temptress Moon	
July 11, 1997	Shall We Dance?	
July 18, 1997	Her Majesty, Mrs Brown	distribution outside Australia and New Zealand only Nominated - BAFTA Award for Best Film
August 1, 1997	Love Serenade	
August 15, 1997	Cop Land	
August 27, 1997	She's So Lovely	distribution in North and Latin America and Europe excluding France only
September 5, 1997	Mouth to Mouth	distribution only
October 10, 1997	The House of Yes	North American, U.K., Irish and Mexican distribution only
November 7, 1997	The Wings of the Dove	
November 26, 1997	Welcome to Sarajevo	distribution in North America, Australia, New Zealand, France, Spain, Germany and Austria only; co-production with Channel Four Films; Nominated - Palme d'Or
December 3, 1997	Office Killer	international theatrical and worldwide home video distribution only
December 5, 1997	Good Will Hunting	Nominated - Academy Award for Best Picture; Nominated - Golden Bear; Nominated - Golden Globe Award for Best Motion Picture - Drama; Nominated - Satellite Award for Best Film - Drama
December 25, 1997	Jackie Brown (Note: Owned by Lionsgate and Quentin Tarantino)	co-production with A Band Apart
December 25, 1997	Wishful Thinking	
December 25, 1997	Shades of Fear	
January 19, 1998	Jerry and Tom	co-production with Lionsgate Films
January 30, 1998	Four Days in September	North American distribution only Nominated - Academy Award for Best Foreign Language Film; Nominated - Golden Bear
February 20, 1998	Little City	distribution in North America, the U.K., Ireland, Australia, New Zealand and Scandinavia only
March 14, 1998	God Said Ha!	distribution only
March 20, 1998	Wide Awake	
March 27, 1998	A Price Above Rubies	
April 10, 1998	The Big One	North and Latin American and Asian distribution only; co-production with BBC Films
April 10, 1998	Sonatine	North American distribution only
April 10, 1998	Summer Fling	
April 18, 1998	Since You've Been Gone	TV movie
April 24, 1998	Sliding Doors (Note: Owned by Library Rights Company (UK), Ltd. and Zelus Film Holding Company, LLC, with U.S. distribution rights currently licensed to Shout! Studios)	U.S. theatrical and television and Canadian distribution only; co-acquisition with Paramount Pictures; produced by Intermedia Films and Mirage Enterprises
April 24, 1998	The Truce	North American distribution only
May 8, 1998	Artemisia	U.S., English-speaking Canadian and Brazilian distribution only; released under the Miramax Zoë label Nominated - Golden Globe Award for Best Foreign Language Film
June 5, 1998	Beyond Silence	North American distribution only Nominated - Academy Award for Best Foreign Language Film
June 6, 1998	St. Ives	U.S. distribution only
June 19, 1998	Hav Plenty	
June 26, 1998	Smoke Signals	co-production with ShadowCatcher Entertainment; Inducted into the National Film Registry in 2018
July 31, 1998	Full Tilt Boogie	distribution only
August 7, 1998	Telling You	
August 14, 1998	The Young Girls of Rochefort	U.S. and English-speaking Canadian distribution only; re-release under the Miramax Zoë label
August 21, 1998	Next Stop Wonderland	
August 28, 1998	54	
September 4, 1998	All I Wanna Do	distribution in the U.S., Spain and Latin America excluding Mexico only
September 4, 1998	Firelight (Note: Retained by Disney (via Hollywood Pictures))	
September 11, 1998	Rounders	
September 25, 1998	Monument Ave.	
October 6, 1998	The Bear	direct-to-video
October 9, 1998	The Mighty	distribution only; produced by Scholastic Productions
October 23, 1998	Life Is Beautiful	distribution outside Italy only Academy Award for Best Foreign Language Film; César Award for Best Foreign Film; David di Donatello for Best Film; European Film Award for Best Film; Goya Award for Best European Film; Grand Prix (Cannes Film Festival); Satellite Award for Best Foreign Language Film; Toronto International Film Festival People's Choice Award; Nominated - Academy Award for Best Picture; Nominated - BAFTA Award for Best Film Not in the English Language; Nominated - Czech Lion Award for Best Foreign Film
October 30, 1998	Talk of Angels	
November 6, 1998	Velvet Goldmine	North American distribution only Nominated - GLAAD Media Award for Outstanding Film - Limited Release; Nominated - Independent Spirit Award for Best Feature; Nominated - Palme d'Or
November 20, 1998	Celebrity	distribution only; produced by Sweetland Films
December 4, 1998	Little Voice	
December 11, 1998	Shakespeare in Love	North American distribution only; co-production with Universal Pictures; Academy Award for Best Picture; BAFTA Award for Best Film; Golden Globe Award for Best Motion Picture - Musical or Comedy; Satellite Award for Best Film - Musical or Comedy; Silver Bear; Nominated - David di Donatello for Best Foreign Film; Nominated - Golden Bear
December 18, 1998	Playing by Heart (Note: Distribution rights co-owned by Resurgence Media Group)	co-production with Intermedia
December 25, 1998	Down in the Delta	North American theatrical and home video distribution only
December 25, 1998	Sweet Revenge	North American distribution only
January 22, 1999	Children of Heaven	distribution outside Iran only
January 24, 1999	Get Bruce	
January 29, 1999	She's All That	co-production with FilmColony and Tapestry Films
February 18, 1999	Central Station	distribution in the U.K., Ireland, Australia, New Zealand, Scandinavia, the Netherlands, Central and South America excluding Brazil, Africa, Eastern Europe, Greece and the Middle East only BAFTA Award for Best Film Not in the English Language; Golden Bear; Golden Globe Award for Best Foreign Language Film; National Board of Review Award for Best Foreign Language Film; Nominated - Academy Award for Best Foreign Language Film; Nominated - César Award for Best Foreign Film; Nominated - David di Donatello for Best Foreign Film; Nominated - Independent Spirit Award for Best International Film; Nominated - Satellite Award for Best Foreign Language Film
March 12, 1999	The Harmonists	North American distribution only
March 26, 1999	A Walk on the Moon (Note: Co-owned by Alcon Entertainment)	distribution in North and Latin America, France, Japan, the Netherlands and Eastern Europe only; co-production with Village Roadshow Pictures and Punch Productions
April 23, 1999	The Mighty Peking Man	re-release
April 30, 1999	Heaven	North American distribution only; co-production with Midnight Film Productions
May 7, 1999	The Castle	North American distribution only
June 18, 1999	An Ideal Husband	North American, Spanish and Italian distribution only
June 25, 1999	My Son the Fanatic	North American distribution only
June 25, 1999	Rogue Trader	North American distribution only; produced by Granada and Newmarket Capital Group
July 2, 1999	The Lovers on the Bridge	U.S. and English-speaking Canadian distribution only; release under the Miramax Zoë label
July 23, 1999	My Life So Far	
August 27, 1999	The Very Thought of You	U.S. distribution only; produced by FilmFour
September 1, 1999	Outside Providence	
September 10, 1999	B. Monkey	
September 11, 1999	My Voyage to Italy	
September 24, 1999	Guinevere	North American, U.K., Irish, Australian and New Zealand distribution only; co-production with Millennium Films
October 1, 1999	Happy, Texas	distribution only
October 8, 1999	The Grandfather	
October 29, 1999	Music of the Heart	
October 29, 1999	Princess Mononoke (Note: Non-Japanese rights owned by GKIDS in North America and Goodfellas internationally)	English dub North American distribution only; produced by Studio Ghibli; Japan Academy Film Prize for Picture of the Year; Nominated - Satellite Award for Best Animated or Mixed Media Feature
November 12, 1999	Dogma (Note: Currently owned by Triple Media Film and View Askew Productions, with North American rights licensed to Iconic Events and international rights licensed to Goodfellas)	International distribution only; domestic distribution rights sold to Lionsgate Films; co-production with View Askew Productions
November 19, 1999	Mansfield Park	co-production with BBC Films
December 1, 1999	Spanish Fly	
December 3, 1999	Holy Smoke!	
December 10, 1999	The Cider House Rules	Nominated - Academy Award for Best Picture
December 10, 1999	Diamonds	
December 25, 1999	The Talented Mr. Ripley	International distribution only; produced by Mirage Enterprises and Timnick Films; distributed by Paramount Pictures in North America

== 2000s ==
Release date	Title	Notes
January 21, 2000	Down to You	
February 25, 2000	Reindeer Games	
April 14, 2000	East Is East	North American, Australian and New Zealand distribution only, produced by FilmFour; BAFTA Award for Outstanding British Film
April 28, 2000	Committed	
May 5, 2000	Human Traffic	North American distribution only
May 12, 2000	Hamlet	
June 9, 2000	Love's Labour's Lost	North American distribution only; co-production with Intermedia
June 16, 2000	Butterfly's Tongue	U.S. distribution only Nominated - Goya Award for Best Film
July 14, 2000	Immortality	also known as The Wisdom of Crocodiles
September 1, 2000	Highlander: Endgame	
October 20, 2000	Calle 54	Nominated - European Film Award for Best Documentary; Nominated - Satellite Award for Best Documentary Film
October 20, 2000	The Yards	
November 17, 2000	Bounce	
December 1, 2000	A Hard Day's Night (Note: Owned by the estate of Walter Shenson under HDN, LLC, with U.S. distribution rights currently licensed to Janus Films and The Criterion Collection)	re-release
December 15, 2000	Chocolat	Nominated - Academy Award for Best Picture; Nominated - David di Donatello for Best Foreign Film; Nominated - Golden Bear; Nominated - Golden Globe Award for Best Motion Picture - Musical or Comedy; Nominated - Goya Award for Best European Film; Nominated - Japan Academy Film Prize for Outstanding Foreign Language Film
December 25, 2000	All the Pretty Horses	U.S. theatrical distribution only; co-production with Columbia Pictures
December 25, 2000	Malèna	distribution outside Italy only Nominated - BAFTA Award for Best Film Not in the English Language; Nominated - Golden Bear; Nominated - Golden Globe Award for Best Foreign Language Film; Nominated - Satellite Award for Best Foreign Language Film
December 25, 2000	Vatel	North American distribution only; produced by Gaumont
February 9, 2001	The Taste of Others	U.S. co-distribution with Offline Releasing only; produced by Pathé; César Award for Best Film; David di Donatello for Best Foreign Film; Nominated - Academy Award for Best Foreign Language Film; Nominated - European Film Award for Best Film
March 7, 2001	Blow Dry	North American, U.K. and Irish distribution only; co-production with Mirage Enterprises and IM: Intermedia Films
March 9, 2001	Get Over It	co-production with Ignite Entertainment
April 13, 2001	Bridget Jones's Diary	North American distribution only; co-production with Universal Pictures, StudioCanal and Working Title Films; Nominated - BAFTA Award for Best Film; Nominated - BAFTA Award for Outstanding British Film; Nominated - European Film Award for Best Film; Nominated - Golden Globe Award for Best Motion Picture - Musical or Comedy; Nominated - Goya Award for Best European Film; Nominated - Satellite Award for Best Film - Musical or Comedy
April 20, 2001	With a Friend Like Harry...	U.S. distribution only; released under the Miramax Zoë label Nominated - BAFTA Award for Best Film Not in the English Language; Nominated - César Award for Best Film; Nominated - European Film Award for Best Film; Nominated - Palme d'Or
May 18, 2001	About Adam	co-production with BBC Films
June 8, 2001	The Son's Room	U.S. and English-speaking Canadian distribution only David di Donatello for Best Film; Palme d'Or; Nominated - César Award for Best Foreign Film
June 29, 2001	The Closet	released under the Miramax Zoë label
June 29, 2001	Everybody's Famous!	U.S. and English-speaking Canadian distribution only Nominated - Academy Award for Best Foreign Language Film
August 3, 2001	Apocalypse Now Redux	re-edit of 1979 film Apocalypse Now distribution in North America theatrically, U.K., Ireland, Latin America and Italy only
August 17, 2001	Captain Corelli's Mandolin	distribution in the U.K., Ireland, Australia, New Zealand, Japan and the CIS only; co-acquisition with Universal Pictures; produced by StudioCanal and Working Title Films
September 7, 2001	The Musketeer	U.K. and Irish distribution only; co-acquisition with Universal Pictures; produced by MDP Worldwide and Crystal Sky Pictures
October 5, 2001	Serendipity	co-production with Tapestry Films
October 12, 2001	Iron Monkey	
October 26, 2001	On the Line	co-production with Tapestry Films
October 26, 2001	Daddy and Them	co-production with Shooting Gallery
November 16, 2001	Amélie (Note: Distribution rights in the U.S. and English-speaking Canada currently owned by Sony Pictures Classics)	North and Latin American distribution only; released under the Miramax Zoë label César Award for Best Film; European Film Award for Best Film; Toronto International Film Festival People's Choice Award; Nominated - Academy Award for Best Foreign Language Film; Nominated - BAFTA Award for Best Film; Nominated - BAFTA Award for Best Film Not in the English Language; Nominated - Golden Globe Award for Best Foreign Language Film
December 7, 2001	Baran	North American and Italian distribution only Nominated - Satellite Award for Best Foreign Language Film
December 12, 2001	Behind the Sun	distribution outside France, Switzerland and Brazil only Nominated - BAFTA Award for Best Film Not in the English Language; Nominated - Golden Bear; Nominated - Golden Globe Award for Best Foreign Language Film
December 13, 2001	Piñero	co-production with Greenestreet Films
December 14, 2001	Iris	with The BBC Film Finance and Intermedia Films; Nominated - BAFTA Award for Outstanding British Film; Nominated - Golden Bear
December 25, 2001	In the Bedroom	North American, U.K., Irish, Australian, New Zealand and Indian distribution only Nominated - Academy Award for Best Picture; Nominated - Golden Globe Award for Best Motion Picture - Drama; Nominated - Satellite Award for Best Film - Drama
December 25, 2001	Kate & Leopold	
December 25, 2001	The Shipping News	
January 18, 2002	Italian for Beginners	U.S., English-speaking Canadian and Mexican distribution only; produced by Zentropa Entertainments; Silver Bear Grand Jury Prize
February 1, 2002	Birthday Girl	U.S. distribution only; co-production with Film4 and Mirage Enterprises
March 1, 2002	40 Days and 40 Nights	U.S. distribution only; co-production with Universal Pictures, StudioCanal and Working Title Films
March 22, 2002	Stolen Summer	
April 19, 2002	Enigma (Note: U.K. distribution rights currently owned by Icon Film Distribution)	select international distribution only; produced by Broadway Video, Jagged Films, Senator Entertainment and Intermedia Films
April 19, 2002	Lucky Break	Australian and New Zealand distribution only; co-acquisition with Paramount Pictures; produced by Fragile Films and Film4
May 17, 2002	The Importance of Being Earnest	co-production with Ealing Studios
May 31, 2002	The Third Wheel	
June 7, 2002	Asterix & Obelix: Mission Cleopatra	distribution in the U.S., English-speaking Canada and Hispanic America only
August 2, 2002	Tadpole	distribution only Nominated - Grand Jury Prize Dramatic
August 2, 2002	Full Frontal	
August 20, 2002	Shiner	
August 23, 2002	Undisputed	U.S., U.K. and Irish distribution only; produced by Millennium Films
August 23, 2002	Jeepers Creepers	Italian distribution only; produced by Capitol Films, American Zoetrope and Cinerenta
September 20, 2002	The Four Feathers	international distribution only; co-production with Jaffilms; distributed by Paramount Pictures in North America
October 4, 2002	Heaven	distribution outside Germany, Austria and Switzerland only Nominated - Golden Bear
October 11, 2002	Comedian	distribution only
October 11, 2002	Pokémon 4Ever	distribution outside Asia only; produced by Pokémon USA, Inc., 4Kids Entertainment, Nintendo and OLM, Inc.
October 18, 2002	Naqoyqatsi	
October 25, 2002	Frida	Nominated - GLAAD Media Award for Outstanding Film - Wide Release; Nominated - Golden Lion; Inducted into the National Film Registry in 2025
October 25, 2002	Waking Up in Reno	
November 8, 2002	The Deep End	Italian distribution only; produced by i5 Films
November 15, 2002	Ararat	U.S. distribution only Genie Award for Best Motion Picture
November 29, 2002	Rabbit-Proof Fence	North and South American, U.K., Irish and Italian distribution only AACTA Award for Best Film
December 20, 2002	Gangs of New York	North American, Benelux, Bulgarian and Scandinavian distribution only; co-production with Touchstone Pictures, Initial Entertainment Group and Alberto Grimaldi Productions; Nominated - Academy Award for Best Picture; Nominated - BAFTA Award for Best Film; Nominated - Cesar Award for Best Foreign Film; Nominated - Golden Globe Award for Best Motion Picture - Drama; Nominated - Japan Academy Film Prize for Outstanding Foreign Language Film
December 25, 2002	Pinocchio	distribution outside Italy only
December 25, 2002	Speakeasy	
December 27, 2002	Chicago	Academy Award for Best Picture; Golden Globe Award for Best Motion Picture – Musical or Comedy; Nominated - BAFTA Award for Best Film; Nominated - David di Donatello for Best Foreign Film; Nominated - Japan Academy Film Prize for Outstanding Foreign Language Film
December 27, 2002	The Hours	international distribution only; co-production with Scott Rudin Productions; distributed by Paramount Pictures in North America; GLAAD Media Award for Outstanding Film - Wide Release; Golden Globe Award for Best Motion Picture - Drama; National Board of Review Award for Best Film; Nominated - Academy Award for Best Picture; Nominated - BAFTA Award for Best Film; Nominated - BAFTA Award for Outstanding British Film; Nominated - Bodil Award for Best American Film; Nominated - César Award for Best Foreign Film; Nominated - Golden Bear; Inducted into the National Film Registry in 2025
December 31, 2002	Confessions of a Dangerous Mind	Nominated - Golden Bear
January 17, 2003	City of God	distribution in North and Latin America, the U.K., Ireland, Australia, New Zealand and Italy only Grande Prêmio do Cinema Brasileiro for Best Film; Satellite Award for Best Foreign Language Film; Nominated - BAFTA Award for Best Foreign Language Film; Nominated - Independent Spirit Award for Best International Film
January 21, 2003	Ordinary Decent Criminal	North American distribution only
February 7, 2003	The Quiet American	Nominated - Satellite Award for Best Film - Drama
March 12, 2003	View from the Top	co-production with Cohen Pictures and Brad Grey Pictures
March 13, 2003	You Can't Stop the Murders	Australian and New Zealand distribution through Buena Vista International only
April 4, 2003	Dysfunktional Family	co-production with Gold Circle Films
April 25, 2003	People I Know	North American distribution only; produced by Myriad Pictures
May 2, 2003	Blue Car	distribution only
May 9, 2003	Only the Strong Survive	
May 16, 2003	Pokémon Heroes	distribution outside Asia only; produced by Pokémon USA, Inc., 4Kids Entertainment, Nintendo and OLM, Inc.
June 13, 2003	Jet Lag	distribution in the U.S., Australia, New Zealand and South Africa only
July 18, 2003	Dirty Pretty Things	distribution outside U.K. television only; co-production with BBC Films; Nominated - BAFTA Award for Outstanding British Film; Nominated - European Film Award for Best Film; Nominated - Golden Lion
July 25, 2003	Buffalo Soldiers	U.S. distribution only; produced by Film4
August 1, 2003	The Magdalene Sisters	Golden Lion; Nominated - Cesar Award for Best Film from the European Union; Nominated - European Film Award for Best Film; Nominated - Independent Spirit Award for Best International Film
August 22, 2003	The Battle of Shaker Heights	
September 26, 2003	Duplex	
October 3, 2003	The Station Agent	distribution in North America, the U.K., Ireland, Australia, New Zealand, South Africa and Italy only Nominated - Grand Jury Prize Dramatic
October 10, 2003	Kill Bill: Volume 1	co-production with A Band Apart; Saturn Award for Best Action, Adventure or Thriller Film
October 31, 2003	The Human Stain	U.S. and select international distribution only; co-production with Lakeshore Entertainment
November 14, 2003	Master and Commander: The Far Side of the World	studio credit, Japanese theatrical and Italian distribution only; co-production with 20th Century Fox, Universal Pictures and Samuel Goldwyn Films; Nominated - Academy Award for Best Picture; Nominated - BAFTA Award for Best Film; Nominated - David di Donatello for Best Film; Nominated - Golden Globe Award for Best Motion Picture - Drama; Nominated - Satellite Award for Best Film - Drama
November 21, 2003	The Barbarian Invasions	U.S. distribution only Academy Award for Best Foreign Language Film; César Award for Best Film; David di Donatello for Best Foreign Film; European Film Award for Best Non-European Film; Genie Award for Best Motion Picture; National Board of Review Award for Best Foreign Language Film; Nominated - BAFTA Award for Best Film Not in the English Language; Nominated - Golden Globe Award for Best Foreign Language Film
December 25, 2003	Cold Mountain	Nominated - BAFTA Award for Best Film; Nominated - Golden Globe Award for Best Motion Picture - Drama
January 9, 2004	My Baby's Daddy	
February 27, 2004	Dirty Dancing: Havana Nights	international distribution outside Asia and Turkey only; co-production with Artisan Entertainment and A Band Apart
March 26, 2004	Jersey Girl	co-production with View Askew Productions
April 2, 2004	Shaolin Soccer	distribution outside China, Hong Kong and Taiwan only Hong Kong Film Award for Best Film
April 9, 2004	Ella Enchanted	
April 9, 2004	I'm Not Scared	distribution in North America, the U.K., Ireland, Australia, New Zealand and France only Nominated - Bodil Award for Best Non-American Film; Nominated - David di Donatello for Best Film
April 16, 2004	Kill Bill: Volume 2	co-production with A Band Apart; Saturn Award for Best Action, Adventure or Thriller Film; Nominated - Satellite Award for Best Film
May 7, 2004	Valentín	North and Latin American distribution only; produced by First Floor Features
June 1, 2004	Pokémon: Jirachi, Wish Maker	distribution outside Asia only; co-production with Pokémon USA, Inc., 4Kids Entertainment, Nintendo and OLM, Inc.
June 4, 2004	Zatōichi	U.S., Latin American, Australian and New Zealand distribution only Japan Academy Film Prize for Picture of the Year; Silver Lion; Toronto International Film Festival People's Choice Award; Nominated - Golden Lion; Nominated - Hong Kong Film Award for Best Asian Film
June 8, 2004	Carolina	U.S. distribution only
July 28, 2004	Garden State	international distribution outside Eastern Europe, the CIS, the Middle East, Israel and Asia only; co-production with Camelot Pictures and Fox Searchlight Pictures
August 27, 2004	Hero	distribution in North and Latin America, the U.K., Ireland, Australia, New Zealand, South Africa and Italy only; produced by Edko Films, Sil-Metropole Organisation, China Film Co-Production Corporation, Elite Group Enterprises, Zhang Yimou Studio and Beijing New Picture Film; Nominated - Academy Award for Best Foreign Language Film; Nominated - Golden Bear; Nominated - Golden Globe Award for Best Foreign Film; Nominated - Hong Kong Film Award for Best Film
September 24, 2004	Infernal Affairs	distribution in North and Latin America excluding Mexico, Spain and Italy only; produced by Media Asia Films and Basic Pictures; Hong Kong Film Award for Best Film
September 28, 2004	My Name Is Modesty	distribution only
October 15, 2004	Shall We Dance?	
October 21, 2004	Chestnut: Hero of Central Park (Note: Main rights owned by WildBrain; distribution rights currently owned by Lionsgate)	
November 19, 2004	Bridget Jones: The Edge of Reason	studio credit only; co-production with StudioCanal and Working Title Films; distributed worldwide by Universal Pictures excluding France
November 23, 2004	In Search of Santa	
November 24, 2004	Finding Neverland	National Board of Review Award for Best Film; Nominated - Academy Award for Best Picture; Nominated - BAFTA Award for Best Film; Nominated - Golden Globe Award for Best Motion Picture - Drama
December 22, 2004	The Chorus	North and Hispanic American, Australian and New Zealand distribution only
December 25, 2004	The Aviator	distribution in the U.S. theatrically and on television, the U.K., Ireland, Germany, Austria, France and Italy only; co-acquisition with Warner Bros. Pictures; produced by Initial Entertainment Group, IMF Productions, Appian Way Productions and Forward Pass; distributed by Warner Bros. Pictures in the U.S. on home media, Canada and Latin America; BAFTA Award for Best Film; Golden Globe Award for Best Motion Picture - Drama; Nominated - Academy Award for Best Picture; Nominated - Satellite Award for Best Film - Drama
January 22, 2005	Pokémon: Destiny Deoxys	distribution only; co-production with The Pokémon Company, 4Kids Entertainment, Nintendo and OLM, Inc.
February 11, 2005	Bride and Prejudice	North and South American, Australian and New Zealand distribution only
February 25, 2005	Cursed	
March 2, 2005	The Best of Youth	distribution in the U.S., English-speaking Canada, the U.K., Ireland, Australia and New Zealand only David di Donatello for Best Film; Un Certain Regard Award; Nominated - César Award for Best Film from the European Union
March 4, 2005	Dear Frankie	distribution in North and South America, Spain, Italy, Germany, Austria, Portugal, Australia, New Zealand, South Africa, the CIS and Asia only
March 11, 2005	Hostage	North American distribution only; co-production with Stratus Film Company and Cheyenne Enterprises
March 19, 2005	Prozac Nation	U.S., U.K., Irish and Italian distribution only; co-production with Millennium Films and Cinerenta
March 22, 2005	Beyblade: Fierce Battle	distribution only; co-production with Toho, d-rights, Nelvana and Nippon Animation
May 6, 2005	Twin Sisters	North American distribution only Nominated - Academy Award for Best Foreign Language Film
June 3, 2005	Cinderella Man	co-production with Imagine Entertainment; distributed by Universal Pictures in North America and Touchstone Pictures through Buena Vista International internationally Nominated - Japan Academy Film Prize for Outstanding Foreign Language Film; Nominated - Satellite Award for Best Film - Drama
June 3, 2005	Deep Blue	North American distribution only
July 15, 2005	The Warrior	distribution in North and South America, Australia, New Zealand, China and Italy only BAFTA Award for Outstanding British Film; Nominated - BAFTA Award for Best Film Not in the English Language
August 5, 2005	Secuestro Express	
August 12, 2005	The Great Raid	
August 26, 2005	The Brothers Grimm	co-production with Dimension Films
September 2, 2005	Underclassman	co-production with Tapestry Films
September 9, 2005	An Unfinished Life	co-production with Revolution Studios and The Ladd Company
September 25, 2005	Daltry Calhoun	
September 30, 2005	Proof	last film to be released during the Weinsteins' management of Miramax; Nominated - Golden Lion
November 4, 2005	Show Me	
November 11, 2005	Derailed	International distribution only; co-production with The Weinstein Company and Di Bonaventura Pictures
November 12, 2005	Undertaking Betty	
December 6, 2005	Two Hands	U.S. distribution only
December 30, 2005	The Matador	U.K., Irish, German and Austrian distribution only; co-production with The Weinstein Company, Stratus Film Company and Irish DreamTime
February 24, 2006	Tsotsi	North American distribution only Academy Award for Best Foreign Language Film; Toronto International Film Festival People's Choice Award; Nominated - David di Donatello for Best Foreign Film
March 16, 2006	Mrs. Henderson Presents	Latin American, German and Austrian distribution through Buena Vista International only Nominated - Critics' Choice Movie Award for Best Comedy; Nominated - David di Donatello for Best European Film; Nominated - Golden Globe Award for Best Motion Picture - Musical or Comedy
April 14, 2006	Kinky Boots	
April 14, 2006	Scary Movie 4	International distribution only; co-production with The Weinstein Company, Dimension Films and Brad Grey Pictures
May 12, 2006	Keeping Up with the Steins	
July 7, 2006	The Heart of the Game	North American distribution only
July 7, 2006	Once in a Lifetime: The Extraordinary Story of the New York Cosmos	
August 4, 2006	The Night Listener	North American distribution only
September 8, 2006	Hollywoodland	International distribution only; co-production with Focus Features; Nominated - Golden Lion
September 22, 2006	Renaissance	North American distribution only; produced by Pathé, Onyx Films, LuxAnimation, France 2 Cinema and Odyssey Entertainment
October 6, 2006	The Queen	North American distribution only; produced by Pathé, Granada Productions, Scott Rudin Productions, BIM Productions, France 3 Cinema and Canal+ BAFTA Award for Best Film; Goya Award for Best European Film; Nominated - Academy Award for Best Picture; Nominated - BAFTA Award for Outstanding British Film; Nominated - César Award for Best Foreign Film; Nominated - David di Donatello for Best Foreign Film; Nominated - European Film Award for Best Film; Nominated - Golden Globe Award for Best Motion Picture - Drama; Nominated - Satellite Award for Best Film - Drama
December 21, 2006	Venus	North American, U.K. and Irish distribution only; produced by FilmFour and UK Film Council; Nominated - Satellite Award for Best Film - Musical or Comedy
January 26, 2007	Breaking and Entering	International distribution only; co-production with The Weinstein Company and Mirage Enterprises; distributed by Metro-Goldwyn-Mayer in the U.S.
March 30, 2007	The Lookout	distribution outside Australia, New Zealand, Greece, Cyprus, Portugal, Angola, Mozambique, Poland and Hungary only; co-production with Spyglass Entertainment
April 6, 2007	The Hoax	North American distribution only
June 15, 2007	Golden Door	U.S., Australian and New Zealand distribution only Silver Lion; Nominated - David di Donatello for Best Film; Nominated - Golden Lion
June 15, 2007	Eagle vs Shark	North American distribution only
July 27, 2007	No. 2	Australian and New Zealand distribution through Buena Vista International only
August 10, 2007	Becoming Jane	North American distribution and U.K. and Irish theatrical distribution only; co-production with HanWay Films, BBC Films and Blueprint Pictures
October 19, 2007	Gone Baby Gone	co-production with The Ladd Company
November 21, 2007	No Country for Old Men	North American distribution only; co-production with Paramount Vantage, Scott Rudin Productions and Mike Zoss Productions; Academy Award for Best Picture; David di Donatello for Best Foreign Film; National Board of Review Award for Best Film; Satellite Award for Best Film - Drama; Nominated - BAFTA Award for Best Film; Nominated - Golden Globe for Best Motion Picture - Drama; Nominated - Japan Academy Film Prize for Outstanding Foreign Language Film; Nominated - Palme d'Or; Inducted into the National Film Registry in 2024
November 30, 2007	The Diving Bell and the Butterfly	North American distribution only; produced by Pathé, France 3 Cinema and The Kennedy/Marshall Company; Golden Globe Award for Best Foreign Language Film; Nominated - BAFTA Award for Best Film Not in the English Language; Nominated - Palme d'Or
December 26, 2007	There Will Be Blood	international distribution only; co-production with Paramount Vantage and Ghoulardi Film Company; Nominated - Academy Award for Best Picture; Nominated - BAFTA Award for Best Film; Nominated - César Award for Best Foreign Film; Nominated - David di Donatello for Best Foreign Film; Nominated - Golden Globe Award for Best Motion Picture - Drama
February 29, 2008	City of Men	distribution in North America, the U.K., Ireland, Australia, New Zealand and South Africa only
April 11, 2008	Smart People	North American distribution only, co-production with Grosvenor Park
May 16, 2008	Reprise	U.S. co-distribution with Red Envelope Entertainment only Nominated - Bodil Award for Best Non-American Film; Nominated - European Film Award for Best Film; Nominated - Satellite Award for Best Foreign Language Film
July 25, 2008	Brideshead Revisited	North American and Italian distribution and U.K. and Irish theatrical distribution only; produced by BBC Films and Recorded Picture Company; Nominated - GLAAD Media Award for Outstanding Film - Wide Release
October 3, 2008	Blindness	U.S. distribution only Nominated - Palme d'Or
October 10, 2008	Happy-Go-Lucky	North American distribution only; produced by Summit Entertainment, Ingenious Film Partners and Film4; Satellite Award for Best Film - Musical or Comedy; Nominated - Golden Bear; Nominated - Golden Globe Award for Best Motion Picture - Musical or Comedy
November 28, 2008	The Boy in the Striped Pajamas	co-production with BBC Films and Heyday Films; Nominated - Goya Award for Best European Film
December 25, 2008	Doubt	
February 21, 2009	Dean Spanley	U.S. distribution only
April 3, 2009	Adventureland	co-production with Sidney Kimmel Entertainment; rights licensed to Roadshow Films for Australia and New Zealand
June 26, 2009	Chéri	North American distribution only Nominated - Golden Bear
September 4, 2009	Extract	North American distribution only; co-production with Ternion Entertainment
September 25, 2009	The Boys Are Back	distribution in North America and Western Europe excluding Spain only; co-production with BBC Films limited release
December 4, 2009	Everybody's Fine	distribution outside Italy only; co-production with Radar Pictures

== 2010s ==
Release date	Title	Notes
August 20, 2010	The Switch	North American distribution only; co-production with Mandate Pictures, last film to be released by Miramax during their Disney tenure before being sold to Filmyard Holdings
December 10, 2010	The Tempest	co-production with Touchstone Pictures and Chartoff/Hendee Productions
February 11, 2011	Gnomeo & Juliet	copyright holder only; released by Touchstone Pictures; produced by Rocket Pictures and Starz Animation
May 6, 2011	Last Night	distribution in North and Latin America, the U.K., Ireland, Australia, New Zealand and South Africa only; co-production with Gaumont; co-distributed theatrically in the U.S. by Tribeca Film
August 26, 2011	Don't Be Afraid of the Dark	U.S. co-distribution with FilmDistrict only
August 31, 2011	The Debt	co-production with MARV; distributed by Focus Features in the U.S. and Universal Pictures internationally
August 22, 2014	Sin City: A Dame to Kill For	co-production with Dimension Films, Aldamisa Entertainment and Troublemaker Studios; distributed by The Weinstein Company
January 16, 2015	The Wedding Ringer	co-production with Rainforest Films; distributed by Screen Gems
July 17, 2015	Mr. Holmes	U.S. co-distribution with Roadside Attractions only; produced by BBC Films, See-Saw Films, AI-Film and FilmNation Entertainment
November 2, 2015	The Leisure Class	distributed by HBO Films
August 26, 2016	Southside with You	North American, U.K., Irish, Australian and New Zealand distribution only; co-distributed in North America by Roadside Attractions
September 2, 2016	The 9th Life of Louis Drax	co-production with Summit Premiere, Brightlight Pictures and Sierra/Affinity; distributed by Lionsgate
September 16, 2016	Bridget Jones's Baby	co-production with Working Title Films and StudioCanal; distributed by Universal Pictures
November 23, 2016	Bad Santa 2	co-production with Ingenious Media, Talent Group and Gunn Films; distributed by Broad Green Pictures in the U.S.
October 13, 2017	American Satan	distribution only; produced by Sumerian Films, Jeff Rice Films and Intrinsic Value Films; co-distributed theatrically in the U.S. by AMC Independent
July 6, 2018	Whitney	distribution in North and Latin America, Eastern Europe, the Benelux, the CIS, Greece, Cyprus, Portugal, Israel and China only; co-distributed in the U.S. by Roadside Attractions
October 19, 2018	Halloween	co-production with Blumhouse Productions, Trancas International Pictures and Rough House Pictures; distributed by Universal Pictures
May 24, 2019	The Perfection	co-production with Capstone Film Group; distributed by Netflix
October 15, 2019	Jay and Silent Bob Reboot	co-production with Destro Films, Mewesings, SModCo, View Askew Productions, Hideout Pictures, and Intercut Capital; distributed by Saban Films in the U.S. and Universal Pictures internationally

== 2020s ==
Release date	Title	Notes
January 24, 2020	The Gentlemen	co-production with Toff Guy Films; distributed by STXfilms in the U.S.
November 25, 2020	Uncle Frank	co-production with Your Face Goes Here Entertainment, Byblos Entertainment, Cota Films and Parts & Labor; distributed by Amazon Studios
March 19, 2021	City of Lies	co-production with Good Films, Lipsync, Romulus Entertainment, VXII 9, Infinitum Nihil, Global Road Entertainment; distributed by Saban Films in the U.S.
May 7, 2021	Wrath of Man	co-production with Metro-Goldwyn-Mayer and Toff Guy Films; distributed by United Artists Releasing in the U.S.
August 27, 2021	He's All That	co-production with Offspring Entertainment; distributed by Netflix
October 15, 2021	Halloween Kills	co-production with Blumhouse Productions, Trancas International Pictures and Rough House Pictures; distributed by Universal Pictures
December 17, 2021	Mother/Android	co-production with 6th & Idaho Productions; distributed by Hulu in the U.S.
September 16, 2022	Confess, Fletch	distributed by Paramount Pictures
October 14, 2022	Halloween Ends	co-production with Blumhouse Productions, Trancas International Pictures and Rough House Pictures; distributed by Universal Pictures
January 13, 2023	Sick	co-production with Blumhouse Productions and Outerbanks Entertainment; distributed by Peacock
March 3, 2023	Operation Fortune: Ruse de Guerre	co-production with STXfilms and Toff Guy Films; distributed by Lionsgate in the U.S.
October 20, 2023	Old Dads	co-production with All Things Comedy; distributed by Netflix
October 27, 2023	The Holdovers	co-production with Gran Via Productions; distributed by Focus Features; Satellite Award for Best Film - Musical or Comedy; Nominated - Academy Award for Best Picture; Nominated - BAFTA Award for Best Film; Nominated - Golden Globe Award for Best Motion Picture - Musical or Comedy; Nominated - Producers Guild of America Award for Best Theatrical Motion Picture
January 12, 2024	The Beekeeper	co-production with Metro-Goldwyn-Mayer, Cedar Park Entertainment and Punch Palace Productions; distributed by Amazon MGM Studios in the U.S.
June 21, 2024	The Exorcism	co-production with Outerbanks Entertainment; distributed by Vertical
August 23, 2024	Strange Darling	co-production with Spooky Pictures; distributed by Magenta Light Studios in the U.S.
November 1, 2024	Here	co-production with ImageMovers; distributed by TriStar Pictures in the U.S.
January 24, 2025	Inheritance	co-production with Nota Bene Films; distributed by IFC Films in North America
February 14, 2025	Bridget Jones: Mad About the Boy	co-production with Working Title Films and StudioCanal; distributed by Universal Pictures; releasing on Peacock in the U.S.
July 25, 2025	The Home	co-production with BlockFilm and Man in a Tree Productions; distributed by Lionsgate and Roadside Attractions in the U.S.
October 10, 2025	Roofman	co-production with FilmNation Entertainment, Limelight, High Frequency Entertainment, Hunting Lane and 51 Entertainment; distributed in the U.S. and U.K. by Paramount Pictures
June 5, 2026	Scary Movie	co-production with Paramount Pictures and Wayans Bros. Entertainment

== Upcoming films ==
Release date	Title	Notes
January 15, 2027	The Beekeeper 2	co-production with Amazon MGM Studios, Punch Palace Productions and Long Shot Productions

=== Undated films ===
Release date	Title	Notes
2027	4 Kids Walk Into a Bank	co-production with Point Grey Pictures, Picturestart, Wild Atlantic Pictures, Aperture Media Partners, Round Mound Media, Black Mask Studios and Uncle Pete Productions; distributed in the U.S. by Amazon MGM Studios through Orion Pictures
2027	Supermax	co-production with The Picture Company and Westbrook Studios; distributed by Amazon MGM Studios
TBA	The Burnout	
TBA	Everything We Never Said	co-production with Alloy Entertainment
TBA	Forever	co-production with Amazon MGM Studios and Somewhere Pictures
TBA	How to Make Millions Before Grandma Dies	
TBA	I Can See You're Angry	co-production with BoulderLight Pictures
TBA	John Doe	co-production with Punch Palace Productions
TBA	London Ghost Tour	co-production with Di Bonaventura Pictures
TBA	Monster Mash	co-production with Reservoir Media and Capizzi Music Co.
TBA	Ruins	co-production with Scott Free Productions, Linden Entertainment and Aluna Entertainment
TBA	Scandalous!	
TBA	Serendipity	co-production with Semi-Formal Productions; distributed by Amazon MGM Studios
TBA	Silent Retreat	
TBA	Untitled The Faculty remake	co-production with BoulderLight Pictures and Troublemaker Studios
TBA	Vigilant	

== Direct-to-video films ==
Release date	Title	Notes
October 13, 1993	Dust Devil	direct-to-video
April 11, 1995	Roadflower	direct-to-video
September 17, 1996	Hidden Assassin	direct-to-video
August 26, 1997	How the Toys Saved Christmas	direct-to-video
June 16, 1998	The Rage	direct-to-video
August 6, 2002	The Adventures of Tom Thumb and Thumbelina	direct-to-video
October 22, 2002	Warriors of Virtue: The Return to Tao	direct-to-video
September 16, 2003	Bionicle: Mask of Light	direct-to-video
April 13, 2004	Paul McCartney: Music & Animation	direct-to-video
October 19, 2004	Bionicle 2: Legends of Metru Nui	direct-to-video
August 30, 2005	My Scene Goes Hollywood: The Movie	direct-to-video
September 27, 2005	Go Hugo Go	direct-to-video; distribution
September 27, 2005	Hugo the Movie Star	direct-to-video; distribution
October 11, 2005	Bionicle 3: Web of Shadows	direct-to-video

== Notes ==
Film rights notes
