= Misfire: The Rise and Fall of the Shooting Gallery =

- Film poster
- Directed by: Whitney Ransick
- Produced by: Gil Gilbert; Bob Gosse; Whitney Ransick
- Starring: Robin Tunney; Ray Angelic; Miguel Arteta
- Edited by: Gil Gilbert
- Music by: Sam Bisbee; Dave Thomas Junior
- Distributed by: TSG Documentary, Inc.
- Release date: October 11, 2013
- Running time: 78 minutes
- Country: United States
- Language: English

Misfire: The Rise and Fall of the Shooting Gallery is a 2013 documentary about the American independent film distributor The Shooting Gallery, directed by Whitney Ransick. The film had its world premiere on October 11, 2013 at the Hamptons International Film Festival.

== Synopsis ==
The documentary looks at the independent film distribution company The Shooting Gallery, which experienced a rise in popularity due to their distribution of films like You Can Count on Me and Laws of Gravity. Ransick looks at the company starting with their start in the early nineties to their crash in later years.

== Appearances ==
Listed alphabetically

- Ray Angelic
- Miguel Arteta
- Mark Chandler Bailey
- Eamonn Bowles
- Peter Broderick
- Maggie Carino Ganias
- Jamie Chvotkin
- Barry Cole
- Edie Falco
- Hampton Fancher
- George Feaster
- F.X. Feeney
- James Foley
- Elizabeth Garnder
- Steven Gaydos
- Nick Gomez
- Bob Gosse
- Matthew Harrison
- Ted Hope
- J. Christian Ingvordsen
- William Jennings
- Eli Kabilio
- Jason Kliot
- Danny Leiner
- Tim Blake Nelson
- Amy Nicken
- Amos Poe
- Whitney Ransick
- Brandon Rosser
- Larry Russo
- James Schamus
- John Sloss
- Holly Sorenson
- Paul Speaker
- Michael Spiller
- Morgan Spurlock
- Henry Thomas
- Lina Todd
- Adam Trese
- Robin Tunney
- Christine Vachon
- Chris Walsh
- Boaz Yakin

== Reception ==
Indiewire gave a favorable review of Misfire: The Rise and Fall of the Shooting Gallery, writing that "What makes “Misfire” so powerful is that it isn’t just the story of the Shooting Gallery — which is tragic but one that doesn’t resonate all that well today because their output was often iffy and unmemorable — but the story of independent cinema of that period." The Hollywood Reporter and Grolsch Film Works were more mixed in their reviews and The Hollywood Reporter commented that "Gosse comes across sympathetically, and the film captures the shock of the company's 2001 collapse. But the "rise and fall" chronology is thinner than it should be, leaving us to marvel at the train wreck without exposing anything new about its causes."
