= TSG Pictures =

Defunct film production company

The Shooting Gallery a/k/a TSG Pictures
- Type: Corporation
- Industry: Film production, financing and post production facilities
- Fate: Bankrupt

TSG Pictures (also known as The Shooting Gallery) was a film production company established in 1990 by Bob Gosse, Larry Meistrich, Larry Russo, Whitney Ransick, Christopher Walsh, Eli Kabillio, Daniel Silverman and David Tuttle in association with Hal Hartley, Ted Hope, Nick Gomez and Michael Almereyda. Larry Meistrich was key in raising financing for the newly found film consortium. Its mission was to nurture New York City filmmakers to make director-driven pictures. Meistrich brought into the firm Steve Carlis to share financial oversight responsibilities and bring in new funding sources.

An important participant in the New York independent film industry of the 1990s, associated with fellow New York City director-driven production companies including Good Machine and Killer Films, it produced a number of critically successful films. It was financially powered mostly by two significant business successes, Laws of Gravity (1992) and Sling Blade (1996). It was also noted for its Shooting Gallery Film Series of art-house releases. The company expanded and pursued a variety of business models including ventures in the new media sector, ultimately failing in 2001 under the weight of expenses and debts. Reports of its closure were as early as June. The Shooting Gallery collapsed after hemorrhaging tens of millions of dollars, and one of its founders, Larry Meistrich, declared bankruptcy as well. After TSG failed, it was sued for fraud by banks, law firms, investors, and former employees. In 1999, the company begin financing films with the Starz Encore Group in addition to a pay television deal.

A 2013 documentary by Whitney Ransick, Misfire: The Rise and Fall of the Shooting Gallery, covers the history of the company.

== Filmography ==
Partial List

- Laws of Gravity (1992)
- Hand Gun (1994)
- New Jersey Drive (1995)
- Drunks (1995)
- Cafe Society (1995)
- Comfortably Numb (1995)
- Sling Blade (1996)
- Non-Stop (1996)
- The Last Home Run (1996)
- Layin' Low (1996)
- Niagara, Niagara (1997)
- Henry Fool (1997)
- I Went Down (1997)
- One (1997)
- Too Much Sleep (1997)
- Illtown (1998)
- Frogs for Snakes (1998)
- Strangeland (1998)
- Orphans (1998)
- Croupier (1998)
- Such a Long Journey (1998)
- Free Tibet (1998)
- The 24 Hour Woman (1999)
- The Bumblebee Flies Anyway (1999)
- The Minus Man (1999)
- Judy Berlin (1999)
- Loving Jezebel (1999)
- Southpaw (1999)
- Adrenaline Drive (1999)
- Barenaked in America (1999)
- Human Resources (1999)
- Chinese Coffee (2000)
- Once in the Life (2000)
- Eureka (2000)
- The Low Down (2000)
- A Time for Drunken Horses (2000)
- The Day I Became a Woman (2000)
- Last Resort (2000)
- When Brendan Met Trudy (2000)
- You Can Count on Me (2000)
- Daddy and Them (2001)
