= Larry Meistrich =

American film producer and streaming executive

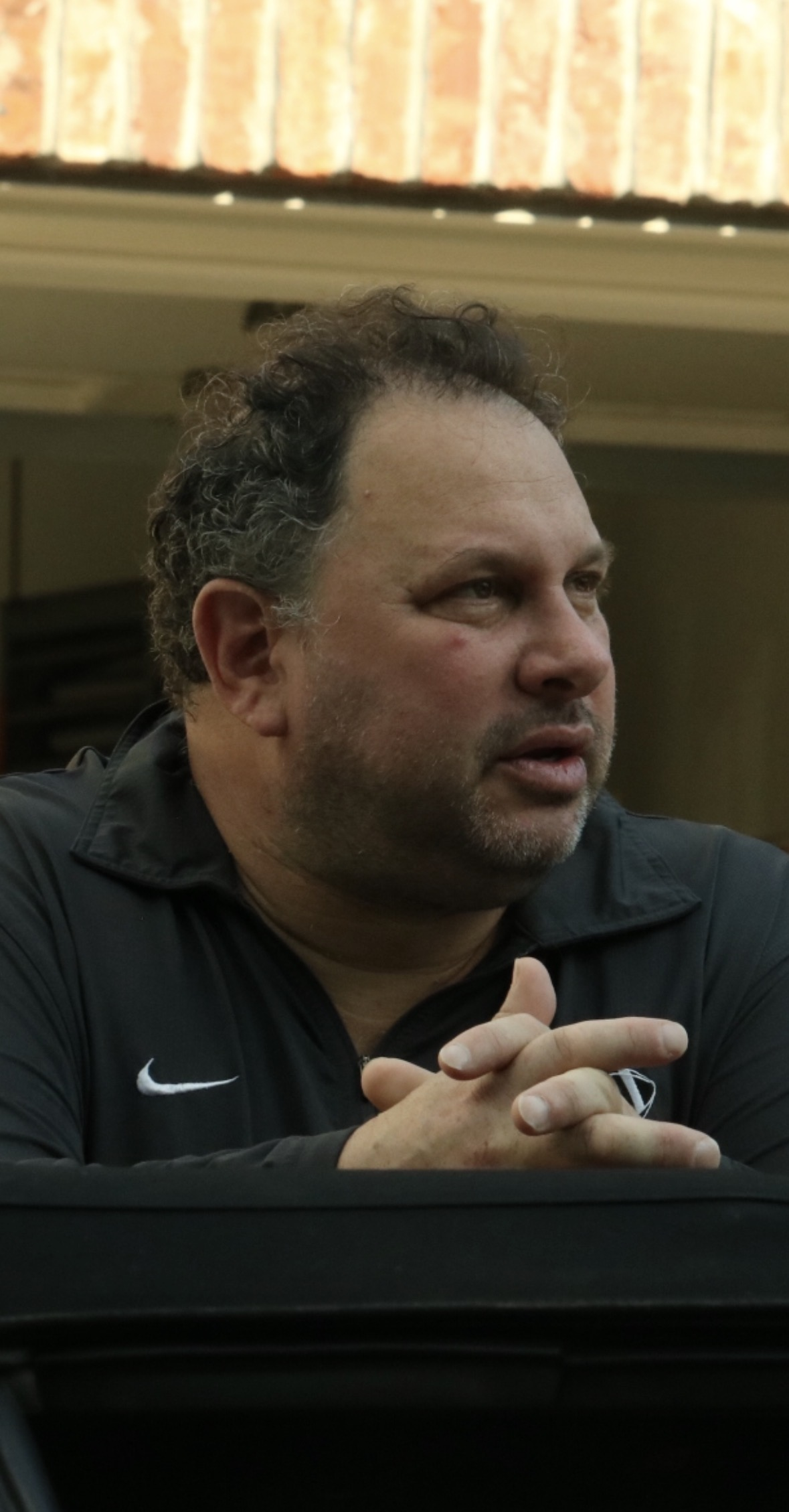
- Larry Meistrich
- Born: Lawrence Steven Meistrich; October 14, 1966 (age 60); The Bronx, New York City, USA
- Occupations: Film producer, streaming executive
- Children: 3

Larry Meistrich (born October 14, 1966) is an American film producer and streaming executive. He founded The Shooting Gallery, an independent film production company that rose to prominence during the 1990s American independent film boom, and later founded Red Coral Universe, an artist-focused streaming platform.

== Early life and education ==
Meistrich was born Lawrence Steven Meistrich on October 14, 1966, in The Bronx, New York City. He attended Horace Mann School in the Bronx before enrolling at Johns Hopkins University, graduating in 1989 with a degree in Writing Seminars. While at Hopkins, he was a member of the Alpha Delta Phi fraternity.

== Career ==
=== The Shooting Gallery (1990–2001) ===
Meistrich founded The Shooting Gallery in 1990, operating from offices on Broadway in Manhattan, where it also rented production space to outside filmmakers. The company produced several films.

The Shooting Gallery's breakthrough came with Nick Gomez's Laws of Gravity (1992), followed by a string of critically acclaimed independent films. As CEO, Meistrich oversaw producing Sling Blade (1996) with Billy Bob Thornton, which received the highest advance ever paid for an independent film at the time—$10 million from Miramax Films—and went on to win the Academy Award for Best Adapted Screenplay. Meistrich received an Independent Spirit Award nomination for Best First Feature for Laws of Gravity in 1993, and was awarded the Crain's Small Business Award in 1998 and the Ernst & Young Entrepreneur of the Year Award in 1999.

The company also produced Hal Hartley's Henry Fool (1997), Belly (1998), and Kenneth Lonergan's You Can Count on Me (2000), the last of which earned Meistrich an Independent Spirit Award for Best Feature and received an Academy Award nomination for Best Original Screenplay. In 2001, The Shooting Gallery produced The Hire, a series of short films for BMW's website directed by filmmakers including Ang Lee, Wong Kar-wai, Guy Ritchie, and Tony Scott, featuring Clive Owen.

In the late 1990s, The Shooting Gallery expanded beyond film production into web content and branded merchandise. The company collapsed in 2001.

=== Film Movement ===
Larry Meistrich has run some controversial film companies, including The Shooting Gallery. He has been sued for fraud due to losing tens of millions of dollars. People and entities who have sued him include banks, law firms, former employees and landlords.Forbes Everything Ventured, Everything LostFraudster or Failure

The Shooting Gallery's closure, Meistrich was chief executive officer of Film Movement, LLC, an independent film distribution company, from 2002 onward, helping to bring international and independent cinema to American audiences.

=== NEHST Studios and DigiNext Films ===
In 2007, Meistrich launched Nehst Media Enterprises, a production, financing, and distribution company focused on features, television, and direct-to-Web content. The company subsequently became NEHST Studios and later merged with another production entity to form DigiNext Films, through which he continued producing independent features and documentaries.

=== Red Coral Universe ===
Meistrich is the founder and CEO of Red Coral Universe, an artist-first AVOD OTT streaming platform dedicated to independent film, television, and music. He founded the company with a team comprising his children Quinn Meistrich and Jamen Meistrich and founding members Steven C. Young and Fisnik Bizati. Young is Head of Content and Bizati Head of Acquisitions.

The platform features a catalog of over 7,000 titles from more than 600 artists and offers creators a greater share of revenue compared with other streaming services. Red Coral Universe also finances, produces, and distributes original films and series. In 2024, the platform reacquired streaming rights to Sling Blade, one of Meistrich's productions.

== Filmography ==
=== As producer (The Shooting Gallery era) ===
| Year | Title | Notes |
|---|---|---|
| 1992 | Laws of Gravity | |
| 1995 | New Jersey Drive | |
| 1996 | Sling Blade | Academy Award for Best Adapted Screenplay |
| 1997 | Henry Fool | |
| 1997 | Niagara, Niagara | |
| 1998 | Belly | |
| 1998 | Strangeland | |
| 1998 | Frogs for Snakes | |
| 1999 | The Minus Man | |
| 1999 | The 24 Hour Woman | |
| 1999 | The Bumblebee Flies Anyway | |
| 2000 | You Can Count on Me | Film Independent Spirit Award for Best Feature; Academy Award nomination, Best Original Screenplay |
| 2000 | The Tic Code | |
| 2000 | Chinese Coffee | |
| 2001 | Daddy and Them | |

=== As producer (NEHST / DigiNext era) ===
| Year | Title | Notes |
|---|---|---|
| 2003 | The Song of the Little Road | |
| 2005 | The Numbers | |
| 2005 | Mechina: A Preparation | |
| 2007 | 41 | |
| 2007 | Intervention | |
| 2007 | Running the Sahara | |
| 2009 | Faded Glory | |
| 2009 | Article 32 | |
| 2009 | Running America | |
| 2010 | The 904: Shadow on the Sunshine State | |
| 2010 | Cut Poison Burn | |
| 2011 | Standing Silent | |
| 2011 | Lilith | |
| 2011 | Thank You For Judging | |
| 2012 | The Standbys | |
| 2012 | Kinderblock 66: Return to the Buchenwald | |
| 2013 | The United States of Football | |
| 2013 | A Miracle in Spanish Harlem | |
| 2013 | Mr. Sophistication | |
| 2014 | The American Nurse | |
| 2014 | Anita B. | |
| 2014 | Drunktown's Finest | |
| 2014 | African Exodus | |
| 2014 | Elephant Blues | |
| 2015 | Pass the Light | |
| 2016 | Leaves of the Tree | |
