= Open Window (film) =

2006 film by Mia Goldman

- Directed by: Mia Goldman
- Written by: Mia Goldman
- Produced by: Thomas K. Barad; Midge Sanford
- Starring: Robin Tunney; Cybill Shepherd; Matt Keeslar; Scott Wilson; Joel Edgerton; Shirley Knight; Elliott Gould
- Cinematography: Denis Maloney
- Edited by: Heather Persons
- Music by: Cliff Eidelman
- Release dates: January 19, 2006 (Sundance); July 16, 2007 (Showtime)
- Running time: 97 minutes
- Country: United States
- Language: English

Open Window is a 2006 American drama film written and directed by Mia Goldman and starring Robin Tunney and Joel Edgerton. Lasse Hallström and Todd Field served as executive producers of the film. It premiered at the Sundance Film Festival on January 19, 2006. It aired on Showtime on July 16, 2007.

== Synopsis ==
Izzy, a photographer, is engaged to Peter, a college professor. One night while working in her photo studio, an assailant breaks into the couple's home and Izzy is raped. In the aftermath, Izzy and Peter are left to deal with her trauma.

== Cast ==
- Robin Tunney as Izzy
- Joel Edgerton as Peter
- Cybill Shepherd as Arlene
- Elliott Gould as John
- Scott Wilson as Eddie
- Matt Keeslar as the Rapist
- Shirley Knight as Dr. Ann Monohan

== Production ==
The film was Mia Goldman's directorial debut. She had previously worked as an editor for films like The Big Easy and My Big Fat Greek Wedding. The film is semi-autobiographical.

The film spent four years in development; actress Robin Tunney remained attached to the film throughout. Said Goldman, "The hardest thing about making the movie was making the deal, getting the [financing]. Everyone told me, 'Anything that has rape in it is a TV movie.'"

== Release ==
The film premiered at the 2006 Sundance Film Festival. It later screened at the 23rd Jerusalem Film Festival that July.

== Home media ==
The film was released on DVD in Australia by Flashback Entertainment, Cat. 24176

== Reception ==
John Anderson of Variety said the film is "a righteous, genuine and emotionally precise movie", but "still goes down like medicine." The Hollywood Reporter's Sura Wood commended the cinematography and score, but felt the film was ultimately undermined by the weak script and characters. Matthew Gilbert of The Boston Globe found the film difficult to watch due to its subject matter, but he commended its "powerful message" and the "admirably pared-down performances by Tunney and Edgerton."
