= Filmyard Holdings =

American holdings company

Filmyard Holdings, LLC
- Type: Joint venture
- Industry: Media
- Founded: December 3, 2010; 15 years ago
- Defunct: March 2, 2016; 10 years ago
- Fate: Folded into Colony Capital
- Products: Movies
- Total assets: US$663 million (2010)
- Owners: Colony Capital; Tutor-Saliba Corporation; Qatar Investment Authority

Filmyard Holdings, LLC was an American pure holding company that owned the film studio Miramax. They operated in between the years of 2010 to 2016. Partners in Filmyard Holdings included Colony Capital, Tutor-Saliba Corporation and Qatar Investment Authority. Actor Rob Lowe was an investor in Colony's entertainment fund. The venture was successful for Filmyard's investors, as they managed to sell Miramax to Qatari state-owned beIN Media Group for roughly $1 billion in 2016, after paying $663 million for it in 2010.

== History ==
=== Miramax acquisition ===
On December 3, 2010, Disney closed the sale of Miramax to Filmyard Holdings. The sale did not include Miramax's genre specialty label Dimension Films, which Bob Weinstein and Harvey Weinstein bought from Disney when they left to form The Weinstein Company in 2005. However, Filmyard did gain control of the pre-October 2005 content library of Dimension, in addition to gaining the entire Miramax library. Regarding the 2010 sale, Tom Barrack of Colony Capital told CNN Business in 2016 "Harvey is probably one of the best independent moviemakers ever, so for a long time Disney was sponsoring Weinstein with Miramax and making independent movies. Iger then decided the Disney brand needed to be clear, clean and unfettered. And so during that period of time, Miramax didn't fit that distribution model. It was different selling a Disney movie than it was selling Shakespeare in Love or Pulp Fiction. And all of those movies were being sold through just that singular distribution method. And Disney had affiliates, since it was part of a family of TV stations. Miramax was left out, Harvey then moved on to build his own firm, they bought Harvey out, and Miramax was sitting in Disney as an orphan." Miramax was Colony Capital's first foray into the film industry. Previous Colony Capital investments included Michael Jackson's Neverland Ranch in 2008, which Jackson abandoned for the Middle East following a 2005 molestation trial, before his eventual death in 2009. In 2010, some in the media compared Colony investing in a Miramax without Harvey Weinstein's leadership as being similar to them investing in a Neverland Ranch without Michael Jackson's star power.

For the 2010 sale, Filmyard investors put in $200 million in capital while raising $400 million in liabilities through Barclays PLC led group of banks. Mike Lang, former business development executive at News Corporation, was selected as the CEO of Miramax, and the sale, estimated around US$663 million, included 700 film titles, as well as 90 book rights, 300 development projects and the "Miramax" name. Additionally, Miramax came with $50 million in cash, $10 million in adjusted fees and two finished films ready for release. Don't Be Afraid of the Dark and The Debt were released in 2011 by FilmDistrict and Focus Features, respectively.

=== Miramax ownership and sale ===
Filmyard was content with generating revenue off Miramax's film library, and in 2011 they sublicensed the library to Netflix for five years, in addition to striking home video distribution deals with Lionsgate and Echo Bridge Entertainment. Barrack later said that distributing to Netflix unlocked "amazing value" for the Miramax assets, since it had never been distributed that way during the Disney ownership, with Disney having only distributed through their own affiliates. On January 22, 2013, Ron Tutor of Tutor-Saliba Corporation sold his stake to co-owner Qatar Investment Authority. Qatar's stake was reported as 75% after this sale. Earlier in April 2012, Filmyard settled a lawsuit out of court with David Bergstein, a former business partner of Tutor and a key figure in orchestrating the Miramax acquisition. Bergstein had filed suit in Los Angeles Superior Court on April 9, 2012, claiming he was owed $6 million and a 3.3% equity stake in Miramax, valued at over $20 million. While the April 24, 2012 settlement terms were undisclosed, sources suggest Bergstein received approximately $4.5 million and relinquished any ongoing ownership interest in Miramax. As part of the settlement, Bergstein retracted claims he made against Filmyard, Miramax, Colony Capital, Richard Nanula (a Colony Capital global operator), and Josh Grode (a legal adviser to Colony Capital during the sale). Nanula subsequently exited Filmyard and Colony Capital in July 2013, amid allegations of a sex scandal that involved porn stars Trinity St. Clair and Samantha Saint.

In July 2015, the Los Angeles Times reported that Filmyard Holdings was considering selling Miramax, although representatives from Colony Capital declined to comment. Miramax was sold to Qatari state-owned beIN Media Group on March 2, 2016. On that day, Filmyard Holdings quietly ceased operations and was folded into Colony Capital (known as DigitalBridge since 2021). Colony Capital later made an attempt to purchase the assets of The Weinstein Company in the lead up to its bankruptcy, following Harvey Weinstein's October 2017 sexual assault allegations. In April 2020, Miramax became a joint venture between beIN and ViacomCBS (now known as Paramount Skydance), with these entities continuing to manage the studio, its library and the pre-October 2005 library of Dimension.

== See also ==
- List of Miramax films
- The Weinstein Company
