= Daddy and Them =

2001 film by Billy Bob Thornton

- Theatrical release poster
- Directed by: Billy Bob Thornton
- Written by: Billy Bob Thornton
- Produced by: Larry Meistrich
- Starring: Brenda Blethyn; Laura Dern; Andy Griffith; Diane Ladd; Kelly Preston; Billy Bob Thornton; Jamie Lee Curtis; Ben Affleck
- Cinematography: Barry Markowitz
- Edited by: Sally Menke
- Music by: Marty Stuart
- Distributed by: Miramax Films
- Release date: June 6, 2001
- Running time: 101 minutes
- Country: United States
- Language: English
- Budget: $5 million

Daddy and Them is a 2001 American independent Southern Gothic absurdist black comedy film written, directed by, and starring Billy Bob Thornton. It also stars John Prine, Laura Dern, Andy Griffith, Ben Affleck, Kelly Preston, Diane Ladd, Brenda Blethyn, Tuesday Knight, Jamie Lee Curtis, and Jim Varney.

Daddy and Them was filmed in 1998 in the wake of Thornton’s success with Sling Blade and was originally planned as a theatrical release. The release was ultimately delayed by Miramax Films, who found the film not "commercial" enough. The film debuted at the Newport International Film Festival on June 6, 2001. Miramax eventually aired the film on Showtime in January 2003 and released it on DVD on January 13, 2004.

== Plot ==
Arkansas highway department worker Claude Montgomery resides in suburban Lonoke County with his wife Ruby, who have an insecure and antagonist relationship, largely due to Claude's previous relationship with Ruby's older sister, Rose. Ruby's mother Jewel and Rose arrive from Nashville, Tennessee to travel with the couple to Little Rock when Claude's uncle, Hazel, is arrested for attempted murder and armed robbery.

== Cast ==
- Billy Bob Thornton as Claude Montgomery
- Brenda Blethyn as Julia Montgomery, Hazel's English wife
- Laura Dern as Ruby Montgomery, Claude's wife and Rose's sister
- Andy Griffith as O.T. Montgomery, father of Claude and Alvin
- Kelly Preston as Rose, Ruby's sister
- Jamie Lee Curtis as Elaine Bowen, a defense attorney and Lawrence's wife
- Ben Affleck as Lawrence Bowens, a defense attorney and Elaine's husband
- Diane Ladd as Jewel, mother of Ruby and Rose
- Sandra Seacat as Elbe Montgomery, O.T.'s wife and mother of Claude and Alvin
- John Prine as Alvin Montgomery, Claude's brother and son of O.T.
- Jim Varney as Hazel Montgomery, Claude's uncle and brother of O.T.
- Tuesday Knight as Billy Montgomery
- Walton Goggins as Tommy Christian, the alleged victim of Hazel
- Tamara Glynn as Tamara "Tammy" the Paramedic
- Jeff Bailey as J.C. Montgomery, Claude's cousin and son of Hazel

== Production ==
The film was shot in Arkansas from August to October 1998. Filming locations included various sites around Little Rock, including Pinnacle Mountain State Park and the interior of the Arkansas State Capitol.

The song from the same-titled album "In Spite of Ourselves" used during the closing credits was performed by John Prine and Iris DeMent.

== Release ==
Daddy and Them initially had a theatrical release date planned for sometime in late 1999 or early 2000. The release date was pushed back as Miramax Films wanted All the Pretty Horses, a studio film Thornton was directing at the time, to debut first. It continued to sit on the shelf long after Horses premiered in late 2000. Thornton has commented that friction with Miramax Films during the production of Horses played a role in the shelving of Daddy and Them.

The film had its world premiere at the Newport International Film Festival on June 6, 2001.

== Reception ==
Daddy and Them holds an 86% rating based on 7 reviews on the review aggregate site Rotten Tomatoes.

Eddie Cockrell of Variety wrote, "Beneath its deadpan and often absurdist exterior, Daddy and Them feels like a very personal piece of work about how family really does come first, warts and all." Brad Slager of Film Threat was more critical, writing, ”Plotless and pedantic, Daddy and Them is supposed to be a lighthearted look at family dysfunction in the Deep South, but the characters are not enjoyable enough to care about."
