= Mike Lang (film executive) =

American media executive

- Education: Claremont McKenna College (BA); Harvard Business School (MBA)
- Occupation: Media executive
- Employer: Discovery Channel
- Known for: Hulu co-founder

Mike Lang was chief executive officer of Miramax Films. He resigned March 16, 2012.

Lang was a former News Corp. executive, where he was involved in acquiring MySpace and starting the streaming service Hulu. Lang steered the deal for Filmyard Holdings to purchase Miramax Films from The Walt Disney Company. At closing he was named CEO of Miramax Films, where he licensed or sold the bulk of its Weinstein-era film catalog.

In February 2016, Lang joined the Discovery Channel network. That November, Discovery Networks International appointed him to lead its Nordic region of Norway, Sweden, Denmark and Finland, as president of International Development, Digital and Discovery Nordics.
