= Nick Gomez =

Nick Gomez may refer to:

- Nick Gomez (director)
- Nick Gomez (actor)

== See also ==
- Nicholas Gomez, Trinidadian cricketer
