= New Jersey Drive =

1995 film directed by Nick Gomez

- Theatrical Release Poster
- Directed by: Nick Gomez
- Written by: Nick Gomez
- Produced by: Larry Meistrich; Bob Gosse
- Starring: Sharron Corley; Gabriel Casseus; Saul Stein; Gwen McGee
- Cinematography: Adam Kimmel
- Edited by: Tracy Granger
- Music by: Wendy Blackstone
- Production company: 40 Acres and a Mule Filmworks
- Distributed by: Gramercy Pictures
- Release dates: January 1995 (Sundance): April 19, 1995
- Running time: 98 minutes
- Language: English
- Budget: $5 million
- Box office: $3.5 million

New Jersey Drive is a 1995 crime drama film written and directed by Nick Gomez and executive produced by Spike Lee. The film is about joyriding teenagers in 1990s Newark, New Jersey, then known as the "car theft capital of the world". The film was an official selection at the 1995 Sundance Film Festival.

== Cast ==
- Sharron Corley as Jason Petty
- Gabriel Casseus as Kyle "Midget"
- Saul Stein as Lieutenant Emil Roscoe
- Donald Faison as Tiny Dime
- Heavy D as Bo-Kane
- Roscoe Orman as Judge
- Michael Pincus as Emil Roscoe's Cousin - Curly
- Christine Baranski as Prosecutor
- Paul Schulze as Booking Sergeant
- Arthur Nascarella as Mr. Chop Shop
- Gwen McGee as Renee Petty
- T.K. Kirkland as House Rules
- Leslie Segar as Angry Resident

== Production ==
Director Nick Gomez originally pictured the film taking place in Boston or Washington Heights in Manhattan, but ultimately set his sights on Newark after reading about teenagers and joyriding in several articles by The New York Times. In an on-location interview, he stated that he himself used to steal cars for joyrides as a teenager in a working-class neighborhood in Boston, where he previously lived.

Upon seeking permission to shoot the film in the city of Newark itself, city officials would not give permission to film in the city limits. Therefore, locations in Williamsburg, Brooklyn and Glendale, Queens, New York were chosen. Ironically, director Gomez stated that even if he had been granted permission, he still would have shot some scenes in Brooklyn since it was more conveniently located near his home and film studio in Manhattan.

Filming commenced in late March 1994 and concluded on May 16 of that year.

Gomez had mixed thoughts about the finished film, explaining that though he was given a significantly larger budget than his directorial debut film Laws of Gravity, studio heads at Universal, which then had a partnership with Spike Lee's production company 40 Acres and a Mule, felt the script for New Jersey Drive contained elements that were too "germane to the basic thrust of the story. They wanted to push the more obvious action moments. There was also a lot of talk about narrative signposts and that kind of thing, which I just don't understand." The budget for the production was reduced from $8 million to $5 million, and though Gomez thought about taking the project to a different company, he was already 5 months long into developing the screenplay and did not want to have to start all over again somewhere else. However, Gomez did not completely disown the film, saying "The film is mine, and every decision and every compromise that had to made along the way was my decision, for better or for worse."

== Soundtrack ==
Year	Album	Peak chart positions		Certifications
Year	Album	U.S.	U.S. R&B	Certifications
1995	New Jersey Drive, Vol. 1: Released: March 28, 1995; Label: Tommy Boy	22	3	US: Gold
1995	New Jersey Drive, Vol. 2: Released: April 11, 1995; Label: Tommy Boy	58	9	

== Reception ==
On Rotten Tomatoes, the film holds a rating of 64% from 14 reviews, with an average rating of 6.3/10.

The film received critical acclaim for its realism and naturalistic performances. Roger Ebert gave the film three out of four stars, praising Gomez's "good ear for dialogue" and writing of his characters. He added, "The movie is expert on how cars are stolen (it takes about 10 seconds). It is also expert on how a smart and essentially prudent kid ends up inside a lot of stolen cars and gets into a lot of trouble." Ebert's colleague Gene Siskel of the Chicago Tribune also gave a positive review, calling it "A thoughtful, dense and ultimately sad mosaic of street life that communicates one idea very well—that a lot of street crime... derives from precious few alternatives." Siskel noted, "Director Nick Gomez fades in and out of scenes of carjackers and joy rides that escalate quite naturally into deadly trips. To the film's credit, the lasting memory is of more than just a brutal, rogue white cop."

== See also ==
- List of hood films
