= Robin Tunney =

American actress (born 1972)

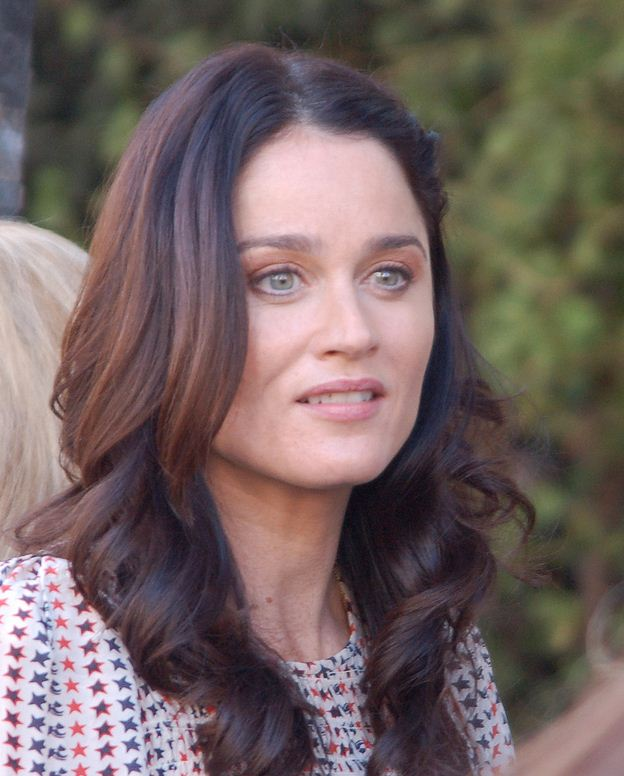
- Tunney in 2013
- Born: June 19, 1972 (age 54); Chicago, Illinois, U.S.
- Occupation: Actress
- Years active: 1991–present
- Spouse: Bob Gosse (m. 1997; div. 2006)
- Partner: Nicky Marmet (2012–present)
- Children: 2
- Relatives: Tom Tunney (cousin)

Robin Tunney (born June 19, 1972) is an American actress. She made her film debut in Encino Man (1992) and rose to prominence with leading roles in the cult films Empire Records (1995) and The Craft (1996). Her performance in Niagara, Niagara (1997) won her the Volpi Cup for Best Actress. She then headlined films like End of Days (1999), Supernova, Vertical Limit (both 2000), Cherish, The Secret Lives of Dentists (both 2002) and The In-Laws (2003).

Tunney's portrayal of a sexual assault victim in Open Window (2006) was praised. Her subsequent film credits include Hollywoodland (2006), August, The Burning Plain (both 2008), Passenger Side (2009), Looking Glass, and Monster Party (both 2018). She played Veronica Donovan in Prison Break (2005–2006) and Teresa Lisbon in The Mentalist (2008–2015), and starred in the short-lived ABC series The Fix (2019).

== Early life and education ==
Tunney was born in Chicago, Illinois, to a car-salesman father, Patrick, and a bartender mother, Cathy. Tunney's father was born in Straide, County Mayo, Ireland, and her maternal grandparents were from Clare Island, Ireland. She is a cousin of Chicago Alderman Tom Tunney.

Tunney grew up in Orland Park, a southwest suburb of Chicago. She was raised Irish Catholic, attended Carl Sandburg High School, Saint Ignatius College Prep in Chicago, and the Chicago Academy for the Arts in Chicago, and resided in Palos Heights, also in the Chicago area.

== Career ==
Tunney moved to Los Angeles and was cast in roles in Class of '96, Law & Order, Dream On, and Life Goes On, among other works. She appeared in the film Empire Records (1995), which was initially a box office flop but later became a cult film. Tunney realized subsequent success in the role of Sarah Bailey in horror-fantasy film The Craft, in which she starred alongside Fairuza Balk, Neve Campbell and Rachel True. The movie was a commercial success, earning $55 million against a budget of $15 million. She later led the independent film Niagara, Niagara, which was released in 1997, and earned critical praise; she won the Volpi Cup for Best Actress at the 1997 Venice International Film Festival. She was also featured opposite Arnold Schwarzenegger in the 1999 supernatural action film End of Days.

Tunney appeared in the 2004 pilot episode of the medical drama series House as a kindergarten instructor who has an aphasic condition. She subsequently portrayed Veronica Donovan on the first season of Prison Break, which was released in 2005 to critical acclaim. Tunney appeared in 2007's Closing the Ring. In the following year, she began one of her longest roles as Teresa Lisbon on the television series The Mentalist, which lasted seven years. In 2018, she led the thriller film Looking Glass alongside Nicolas Cage, which was negatively received although her performance earned praise. In 2019, she starred in the short-lived legal drama series The Fix.

On June 28, 2006, Tunney won her table in the eighth tournament series of Bravo's Celebrity Poker Showdown, moving on to the final table. The finale aired on July 5, 2006, where she finished second to Jason Alexander, earning $200,000 for her charity of choice, the Children's Health Fund. In August 2006, Tunney played in the World Series of Poker after having her entrance fee covered by the online cardroom PokerRoom.com.

== Personal life ==
Tunney married producer and director Bob Gosse on October 4, 1997; they divorced in 2006. Tunney was engaged to Australian writer and director Andrew Dominik from 2009 to 2010. Tunney became engaged to designer Nicky Marmet on December 25, 2012, while on vacation in Rio de Janeiro. Together they have two children.

== Filmography ==
=== Film ===
Year	Title	Role	Notes
1992	Encino Man	Ella	
1995	Empire Records	Debra	
1996	The Craft	Sarah Bailey	MTV Movie Award for Best Fight (shared with Fairuza Balk)
1997	Julian Po	Sarah	
1997	Niagara, Niagara	Marcy	
1998	Montana	Kitty	
1999	End of Days	Christine York	
2000	Supernova	Danika Lund	
2000	Vertical Limit	Annie Garrett	
2001	Investigating Sex	Zoe	
2002	Cherish	Zoe Adler	
2002	The Secret Lives of Dentists	Laura	
2003	The In-Laws	Angela Harris	
2003	Abby Singer	Herself	Cameo appearance
2004	Paparazzi	Abby Laramie	
2004	Shadow of Fear	Wynn French	
2005	The Zodiac	Laura Parish	
2005	Runaway	Carly	
2006	Open Window	Izzy	
2006	Hollywoodland	Leonore Lemmon	
2006	The Darwin Awards	Zoe	
2008	August	Melanie Hanson	
2008	The Burning Plain	Laura	
2012	See Girl Run	Emmie	
2015	My All-American	Gloria Steinmark	
2018	Looking Glass	Maggie	
2018	Monster Party	Roxanne Dawson	
2020	Horse Girl	Agatha Kaine	
2025	By Design	Irene	
2026	Ugly Cry		

=== Television ===
Year	Title	Role	Notes
1991	CBS Schoolbreak Special	Brooke	Episode: "But He Loves Me"
1991	Life Goes On	Mary	Episode: "Corky's Travels"
1992	Perry Mason: The Case of Reckless Romeo	Sandra Turner	Television film
1993	Class of '96	Linda Miller	5 episodes
1993	Frogs!	Hannah	Television film
1993	Cutters	Deborah Hart	5 episodes
1993	JFK: Reckless Youth	Kathleen "Kick" Kennedy	Television miniseries
1993	Dream On	Marybeth	Episode: "Silent Night, Holy Cow Part II"
1994	Law & Order	Jill Templeton	Episode: "Mayhem"
1996	Riders of the Purple Sage	Elizabeth "Bess" Erne	Television film
1998	Rescuers: Stories of Courage: Two Families	Melvina "Malka" Csizmadia	Television film
1998	Naked City: Justice with a Bullet	Merri Coffman	Television film
2003	The Twilight Zone	Edie Durant	Episode: "Developing"
2004	House	Rebecca Adler	Episode: "Pilot"
2005–2006	Prison Break	Veronica Donovan	23 episodes
2007	Robot Chicken	Madame Razz / Entrapta / Carole Demas / Skin Graft Patient (voice)	Episode: "Slaughterhouse on the Prairie"
2008–2015	The Mentalist	Teresa Lisbon	151 episodes
2008	The Two Mr. Kissels	Nancy Kissel	Television film
2016	Love	Waverly	Episode: "The End of the Beginning"
2018	Insatiable	Brandylynn Huggens	Episode: "Miss Bareback Buckaroo"
2019	The Fix	Maya Travis	10 episodes
2023	Dear Edward	Jane Adler	4 episodes

=== Music videos ===
Year	Title	Artist	Notes
1999	"Swingin'"	Tom Petty and the Heartbreakers	
2003	"Breathe In"	Frou Frou	

=== Stage ===
Year	Production	Role	Notes
2016	Smokefall	Violet	MCC Theater

== Awards and nominations ==
Year	Association	Category	Nominated work	Result	Ref.
1997	Fangoria Chainsaw Awards	Best Actress	The Craft	Nominated	
1997	MTV Movie Awards	Best Fight (shared with Fairuza Balk)	The Craft	Won	
1997	Venice Film Festival	Best Actress	Niagara, Niagara	Won	
1998	Gotham Awards	Best Breakthrough Performance	Niagara, Niagara	Nominated	
1999	Independent Spirit Awards	Best Female Lead	Niagara, Niagara	Nominated	
2001	Blockbuster Entertainment Awards	Favorite Actress – Action	Vertical Limit	Nominated	
2006	Boston Film Festival	Best Actress	Open Window	Won	
2015	People's Choice Awards	Favorite Crime Drama TV Actress	The Mentalist	Nominated	
