= Sling Blade =

1996 American drama film by Billy Bob Thornton

- Theatrical release poster
- Directed by: Billy Bob Thornton
- Written by: Billy Bob Thornton
- Based on: Some Folks Call It a Sling Blade (1994) by Billy Bob Thornton
- Produced by: Larry Meistrich; David L. Bushell; Brandon Rosser
- Starring: Billy Bob Thornton; Dwight Yoakam; J. T. Walsh; John Ritter; Lucas Black; Natalie Canerday; Robert Duvall
- Cinematography: Barry Markowitz
- Edited by: Hughes Winborne
- Music by: Daniel Lanois
- Production company: The Shooting Gallery
- Distributed by: Miramax Films
- Release date: November 27, 1996
- Running time: 135 minutes
- Country: United States
- Language: English
- Budget: $1.2 million
- Box office: $34.1 million

Sling Blade is a 1996 American independent Southern Gothic drama film written, directed by and starring Billy Bob Thornton. Set in Arkansas, it is the story of intellectually challenged Karl Childers and the friendship he develops with a boy and his mother. Karl was released from a psychiatric hospital where he had grown up due to having killed his mother and her lover when he was 12 years old. It also stars Dwight Yoakam, J. T. Walsh, John Ritter, Lucas Black, Natalie Canerday, James Hampton, and Robert Duvall.

The film was adapted by Thornton from his previous one-man show Swine Before Pearls, from which he also developed a screenplay for the 1994 short film Some Folks Call It a Sling Blade, directed by George Hickenlooper. Sling Blade was released by Miramax Films on November 27, 1996, and became a sleeper hit, launching Thornton into stardom while grossing $34.1 million against a $1.2 million budget. Thornton won the Academy Award for Best Adapted Screenplay, and he was also nominated for Best Actor. The music for the soundtrack was provided by French-Canadian musician/producer Daniel Lanois.

Sling Blade was filmed in 24 days, on location in Benton, Arkansas, produced by David L. Bushell and Brandon Rosser.

== Plot ==
Karl Childers is a developmentally disabled Arkansas man whose parents physically and mentally abused him when he was young. He has been in the custody of the state mental hospital since the age of 12 after murdering his mother and her teenage lover, who was also his tormentor, with a sling blade. Karl believed his mother was being raped and killed the teen in her defense. When he realized his mother was a willing participant in the affair, Karl killed her as well.

As a passive person, Karl spends his days quietly staring out a window at an open field and wringing his hands together. He is often forced by Charles, a fellow patient, to listen to his stories about unsolved crimes of murder and rape. Charles was, unbeknownst to the hospital, a serial killer. The state determines that Karl is no longer dangerous and releases him. Karl wants to stay, but is told that he has to leave. He goes back to his hometown, where he finds work as a small engine mechanic.

Karl befriends 12-year-old Frank Wheatley and shares details of his past, including the killings. Frank introduces Karl to his mother, Linda, and her gay best friend and boss, Vaughan. Vaughan is concerned about Karl's history, but Linda asks him to move into her garage, which her abusive and alcoholic boyfriend Doyle begrudgingly accepts. Vaughan tells Karl that he fears Doyle could hurt or kill Linda and Frank one day.

Karl becomes a role model to Frank, who misses his deceased father and despises Doyle. As they grow closer, Karl tells Frank that he is haunted by an incident that happened when he was six or eight years old. His parents did not want his baby brother so his father made him dispose of the body. Karl found the baby was still moving, but buried him alive anyway. Karl later visits his sickly father and tries to reconcile, but is rejected. He scolds his father for his past cruelty to him and to his brother. He says that he thought many times about killing him, but no longer sees the need, as he is an old man wasting away in a chair, and will be dead soon enough.

During Doyle's latest drunken outburst, where he refuses to leave Linda's house, Frank fights back. Linda later reconciles with Doyle, who announces that he is moving in with them. He tells Karl that he is no longer welcome. When Frank protests, Doyle grabs him, but Karl intervenes and warns him never to touch Frank again. Doyle insists that he is in charge and orders Karl to leave.

Realizing that an unhappy childhood or worse awaits Frank, Karl persuades him and Linda to spend the night at Vaughan's house. Karl tells Frank that he loves him, and gives him a brotherly hug. Karl then asks Vaughan to promise to look after Frank and Linda. Later that evening, he returns to the Wheatley home carrying a sharpened lawn mower blade, and finds Doyle drunk and alone in the living room. Karl asks Doyle how to call for the police. Doyle tells him to dial 9-1-1 and to tell them to send the police, and either an ambulance or a hearse. Karl then kills him with the lawn mower blade, calls 9-1-1, and sits down at the kitchen table to eat biscuits with mustard, a childhood favorite, while waiting for the police to arrive.

Karl is returned to the state hospital, but is now more assertive. Charles begins telling him more private stories about unsolved crimes involving sexual violence, and then questions him about his relationship with Frank. This angers Karl, and he turns on Charles and tells him to never speak to him again. As Charles walks away, Karl resumes looking out of the window toward the open field, a slight grin on his face.

== Cast ==
- Billy Bob Thornton as Karl Childers
- Dwight Yoakam as Doyle Hargraves
- J. T. Walsh as Charles Bushman
- John Ritter as Vaughan Cunningham
- Lucas Black as Frank Wheatley
- Natalie Canerday as Linda Wheatley
- James Hampton as Jerry Woolridge
- Robert Duvall as Frank Childers
- Jim Jarmusch as Deke, the Frostee Cream employee
- Rick Dial as Bill Cox
- Vic Chesnutt as Terence
- Brent Briscoe as Scooter Hodges
- Mickey Jones as Monty Johnson
- Col. Bruce Hampton as Morris
- Ian Moore as Randy Horsefeathers
- Christine Renee Ward as Melinda

== Production ==
Thornton conceived the character of Karl while working on the film The Man Who Broke 1,000 Chains. He developed the idea into a monologue, which became a one-man show to fund the film. He expanded the monologue into a short film, Some Folks Call it a Sling Blade, directed by George Hickenlooper and starring Thornton, Molly Ringwald, and J. T. Walsh.

The film was made with a production budget of $1 million financed by The Shooting Gallery, and was sold to Miramax for $10 million, which at the time was a record price for an independent film.

== Release ==
The film grossed $24,444,121 in the United States against a $1 million production budget. It grossed a further $9.7 million in other territories for a worldwide total of $34 million.

== Reception ==
On Rotten Tomatoes Sling Blade has a rating of 97% based on reviews from 58 critics with an average rating of 8.40/10. The site's consensus states "You will see what's coming, but the masterful performances, especially Thornton's, will leave you riveted." On Metacritic it has a score of 84% based on reviews from 26 critics.

The Washington Post called it a "masterpiece of Southern storytelling". Kevin Thomas wrote in the Los Angeles Times that the film is "a mesmerizing parable of good and evil and a splendid example of Southern storytelling at its most poetic and imaginative". The New York Times critic Janet Maslin praised the performances but said that "it drifts gradually toward climactic events that seem convenient and contrived".

=== Accolades ===
Award	Category	Nominee(s)	Result	Ref.
Academy Awards	Best Actor	Billy Bob Thornton	Nominated	
Academy Awards	Best Screenplay – Based on Material Previously Produced or Published	Billy Bob Thornton	Won	
Boston Society of Film Critics Awards	Best New Filmmaker	Billy Bob Thornton	Nominated	
Chicago Film Critics Association Awards	Best Actor	Billy Bob Thornton	Won	
Chicago International Film Festival	Special Jury Award	Billy Bob Thornton	Won	
Chlotrudis Awards	Best Picture		Won	
Chlotrudis Awards	Best Director	Billy Bob Thornton	Nominated	
Chlotrudis Awards	Best Actor	Billy Bob Thornton	Won	
Chlotrudis Awards	Best Supporting Actor	Lucas Black	Nominated	
Chlotrudis Awards	Best Supporting Actor	John Ritter	Nominated	
Edgar Allan Poe Awards	Best Motion Picture	Billy Bob Thornton	Won	
Independent Spirit Awards	Best First Feature		Won	
Kansas City Film Critics Circle Awards	Best Actor	Billy Bob Thornton	Won	
National Board of Review Awards	Top Ten Films		7th Place	
National Board of Review Awards	Special Achievement in Filmmaking	Billy Bob Thornton	Won	
Satellite Awards	Best Actor in a Motion Picture – Drama	Billy Bob Thornton	Nominated	
Satellite Awards	Best Screenplay – Adapted	Billy Bob Thornton	Nominated	
Satellite Awards	Best Original Score	Daniel Lanois	Nominated	
Saturn Awards	Best Performance by a Younger Actor	Lucas Black	Won	
Screen Actors Guild Awards	Outstanding Performance by a Cast in a Motion Picture	Lucas Black, Natalie Canerday, Robert Duvall, James Hampton, John Ritter, Billy Bob Thornton, J. T. Walsh, and Dwight Yoakam	Nominated	
Screen Actors Guild Awards	Outstanding Performance by a Male Actor in a Leading Role	Billy Bob Thornton	Nominated	
Writers Guild of America Awards	Best Screenplay – Based on Material Previously Produced or Published	Billy Bob Thornton	Won	
Young Artist Awards	Best Leading Young Actor in a Feature Film	Lucas Black	Won	
YoungStar Awards	Best Performance by a Young Actor in a Drama Film	Lucas Black	Won	
