= Bob Gosse =

American actor

- Born: January 9, 1963 (age 63); Long Island, New York, U.S.
- Occupations: Film director, film producer, actor
- Spouse: Robin Tunney (m. 1997; div. 2006)

Bob Gosse (born January 9, 1963) is an American film producer, film director and actor.

== Background ==
Gosse was born on Long Island, New York. Gosse attended SUNY Purchase where he would meet and collaborate with artists such as Hal Hartley, Nick Gomez, Parker Posey, Wesley Snipes and Edie Falco. After graduating with a BFA degree from the film program at SUNY Purchase in 1986, Gosse joined the independent film scene in New York City, creating short films and features. He was married to Robin Tunney but divorced in 2006. In 2010, he joined the faculty of the University of North Carolina School of the Arts, School of Filmmaking in Producing.

== New York operations ==
Gosse founded independent film company The Shooting Gallery with Larry Meistrich in 1991. His collaborators included Hal Hartley, Ted Hope, Nick Gomez and Michael Almereyda. The company's first feature was Gomez' Laws of Gravity (1992). Gosse also directed The Last Home Run, filmed in 1996 and released in 1998.

Gosse pushed the boundaries of "lo-fi" filmmaking when he produced Almereyda's PixelVision feature, Another Girl Another Planet (1992). It was cited by the National Society of Film Critics in 1992 "for expanding the possibilities of experimental filmmaking."

At The Shooting Gallery, Gosse supported other first-time filmmakers including Morgan J. Freeman, Danny Leiner and Billy Bob Thornton.

In 1995, Gosse co-produced the Nick Gomez-directed film, New Jersey Drive, released that April. He also directed the first screenplay by playwright Matthew Weiss. The result, Niagara, Niagara, premiered to acclaim. Lead actress Robin Tunney took home the prestigious Volpi Cup at the 1997 Venice International Film Festival for her portrayal of a woman with Tourette syndrome. In its American premiere, the film was panned by some critics.

Gosse's follow-up was an adaptation of journalist Alec Wilkinson's nonfiction book A Violent Act.

By late 1999, Gosse was at work on another adaptation, a play by theater scribe Wendy Hammond. The stage play, Julie Johnson, was shot as a feature film beginning in 2000 and it starred Lili Taylor, Courtney Love, Mischa Barton and Spalding Gray. It was released in 2005 by Regent Entertainment.

== Los Angeles operations ==
The Shooting Gallery went out of business in 2001 and Gosse moved west to Los Angeles to produce TV pilots and films. These would include Tim McCann's Runaway (2005) and Almereyda's Tonight At Noon (2006), the latter starring Connie Nielsen, Ethan Hawke, Rutger Hauer, and Lauren Ambrose.

Gosse lives in Winston-Salem, North Carolina and developing a new docu-series. He spent time working for the 2008 Democratic Party nomination of Barack Obama.

Gosse directed Tucker Max's film, I Hope They Serve Beer In Hell.

== Personal life ==
In the early 1990s, Gosse lived with actress Parker Posey, whom he met when they were both students at SUNY Purchase.

On October 5, 1997, Gosse married actress Robin Tunney in New York City; they had met while working together on Niagara, Niagara. They separated in late 2002, and divorced in 2006 but remain close friends.
