= Niagara, Niagara =

- Directed by: Bob Gosse
- Written by: Matthew Weiss
- Produced by: David L. Bushell
- Starring: Robin Tunney; Henry Thomas; Michael Parks; Stephen Lang; John Ventimiglia
- Cinematography: Michael Spiller
- Edited by: Rachel Warden
- Music by: Jeff Bird; Michael Timmins
- Distributed by: The Shooting Gallery
- Release date: August 30, 1997 (Venice Film Festival)
- Running time: 93 minutes
- Languages: English; Spanish

Niagara, Niagara is a 1997 film directed by Bob Gosse, and starring Henry Thomas, Robin Tunney, as well as Michael Parks, John Ventimiglia and Stephen Lang.

The film is a dark and tragic romantic tale about young love, drugs, a cross country trip and Tourette syndrome. Filmed locations were New Paltz, Highland and Poughkeepsie in upstate New York, as well as Niagara Falls and Canada. The film was produced by the New York City based Shooting Gallery.

The film was praised internationally, particularly in the UK, but American critics were mixed. Robin Tunney's performance garnered her the Volpi Cup Award for Best Actress at the 1997 Venice International Film Festival. The film has fallen into a cult status, due to underground popularity.

== Plot ==
The film begins with Seth and Marcy shoplifting items from a dollar type store. The two crooks crash into each other and soon a friendship ensues. After giving Marcy a ride to her weekend job, Seth goes home to his abusive and somewhat mentally unstable father.

The next day Seth is at a different store where he runs into Marcy. After driving over to her home and picking up some of Marcy's personal items, they begin a drive north to Canada in pursuit of a black Barbie styling head for Marcy.

On their drive north, Marcy is unable to hide her tics. At one point, she has an outburst in a parking lot and attacks a guy who was shouting insults to Seth. From this point on, the only things that keep her tics and behaviors at bay are sex and alcohol.

In desperation to get her hands on the antipsychotic haloperidol, they attempt to rob a pharmacy. The pharmacist catches them and shoots Seth in the leg with a shot gun. The two get away, but one of the car tires is hit in the process and eventually Marcy crashes the car.

An old man named Walter tows their truck to his place and helps take care of Seth's wound. Over the course of a week, he teaches the two how to shoot and catch fish.

After a local deputy comes by asking Walter if he'd seen the pair, Marcy has a severe outburst and beats Walter. Seth and Marcy take off in Walter's truck.

The pair make it to Canada and find the Barbie head. The only available black Barbie head is a display model that the store manager refuses to sell. Marcy again has a violent outburst and the cops are called. When the police arrive, she grabs the gun from one police officer and the other surprises her from a side aisle and shoots her dead. Seth is arrested.

Later, we see Walter reading an apologies letter with $20 from Seth. Seth narrates the happy ending that did not happen, as Walter reads his letter.

== Cast ==
- Henry Thomas as Seth
- Robin Tunney as Marcy
- Michael Parks as Walter
- Stephen Lang as Claude
- Candy Clark as Sally
- John Ventimiglia as Doug
- Clea DuVall as Convenience Store Hostage
- Shawn Hatosy as Parking Lot Teen
- Justin Salsberg as Parking Lot Teen
- Jonathan Wong as Onlooker

== Reception ==
On Rotten Tomatoes, the film received a 53% approval rating, based on 15 reviews.

American film critics Gene Siskel and Roger Ebert awarded the film two thumbs up with the latter voicing his disappointment with the film’s genre as a road movie, but nevertheless stated that, “The movie is good, but could have been better if it had been set free to explore.”
