= Nick Gomez (director) =

American film director and writer (born 1963)

- Born: April 13, 1963 (age 63); Providence, Rhode Island, U.S.
- Occupations: Film director, writer
- Years active: 1992–present

Nick Gomez (born April 13, 1963) is an American film director and writer. He has directed for a number of television and film. His first feature-length film was the 1992 movie Laws of Gravity, which won awards at both the Berlin International Film Festival and the Valencia International Film Festival. Gomez's next film was the 1995 crime drama New Jersey Drive, which was screened and competed for a Grand Jury Prize during that year's Sundance Film Festival.

== Life and career ==
Gomez was in Providence, Rhode Island.

Realizing he was not going anywhere fast with his life, he obtained his GED, moved to New York and attended State University of New York at Purchase with an interest in sound design, music, and movies. It was there he met a group of filmmakers, producers, and actors that he would work with for the next decade; producer Bob Gosse, director Hal Hartley, actors Edie Falco, Paul Schulze, Saul Stein, Adam Trese, all of whom Gomez would use in his films.

After SUNY, Gomez worked on commercials and features in NYC and wrote a few scripts that caught some attention around NYC. In the early 1990s Gomez's SUNY friend, Bob Gosse and Larry Meistrich started TSG Pictures in downtown New York to be a home for independent filmmakers. With them, Gomez would make Laws Of Gravity (1992) starring Edie Falco, Adam Trese, and Paul Schulze – heralding a return of American (specifically, New York City, and Brooklyn) cinema verité, for the first time since Sidney Lumet and Martin Scorsese in 1970s.

A reviewer for The Washington Post, De Segonzac, said Laws of Gravity "fills the screen with beautifully framed scenes that need little verbal underpinning."

From there, Gomez made New Jersey Drive (1995) starring Shar-Ron Corley, Gabriel Cassius, Saul Stein, and Donald Faison. Spike Lee, and his company; 40 Acres and A Mule, produced. Gomez received Independent Spirit Award nominations for best director on both the critically acclaimed, Laws of Gravity and New Jersey Drive. New Jersey Drive would also receive the Grand Jury Prize at Sundance in 1995 along with a nomination and win at the Torino and Berlin festivals.

Next, Gomez directed the feature Illtown, starring Michael Rapaport, Lili Taylor, Adam Trese, Kevin Corrigan, Angela Featherstone, Tony Danza, Isaac Hayes, Paul Schulze, Oscar Isaac, and Saul Stein. Of his third, and most experimental feature, Gomez told the Village Voice "The mood and tempo of Illtown express what I felt like at the time. I had to make it come out the other end. It was incredibly hard, but it was really satisfying working on a more intimate scale again."

In 1995, after a screening of Laws of Gravity, Gomez was approached by Tom Fontana and Barry Levinson to create with them a look and tone for their new series for NBC; Homicide: Life on the Street. Gomez would, in turn, direct the pilot for the series and subsequent episodes. In 1997, Gomez would again collaborate with Fontana in the creation of his new series, Oz for HBO.

Following Oz, Gomez, ensconced in the world of television – a place to express his ideas, found himself on the crest of the golden age of television with the explosion of cable. He has directed numerous television episodes over the past 20 years. During his career, he has worked frequently with the creators of Chicago P.D. and other television producers.

Gomez, an episodic director, recently inspired by the wealth of up-and-coming artists, will produce television and bring projects through his company, Eidophusikan Productions.

== Filmography ==
=== Television ===
Director (episodes)

- Elsbeth (CBS)
- So Help Me Todd (CBS)
- CSI: Vegas (CBS)
- La Brea (NBC)
- Charmed (CW)
- Titans (DC Universe/HBO Max)
- New Amsterdam (NBC)
- FBI (CBS)
- Shades of Blue (NBC)
- Imposters (Bravo)
- Midnight, Texas (NBC)
- Salvation (CBS)
- Queen of the South (USA)
- Daredevil (Netflix)
- Supergirl (CBS)
- Burn Notice (USA Network)
- Magic City (Starz)
- Awake (NBC)
- Blue Bloods (CBS)
- Damages
- Drop Dead Diva
- Lights Out (FX)
- Detroit 1-8-7 (ABC)
- Law & Order: Los Angeles
- Rubicon (AMC)
- FlashForward (ABC)
- House (Fox)
- Dark Blue (TNT)
- Eleventh Hour (CBS)
- Knight Rider (NBC)
- Brotherhood (Showtime)
- True Blood (HBO)
- Dexter (Showtime)
- Sleeper Cell (Showtime)
- The Sopranos (HBO)
- The 4400
- The Inside (Fox)
- The Shield (FX)
- Veronica Mars (UPN) (Episode: "You Think You Know Somebody")
- Law & Order: Special Victims Unit (NBC) (Episodes: "Amaro's One-Eighty" and "Townhouse Incident")
- Crisis (NBC)
- Oz (HBO)
- Devious Maids (Lifetime)
- Hap and Leonard (SundanceTV)
- Sneaky Pete (Amazon)
- The Expanse (Amazon)

=== Film ===
Director

- Lizzie Borden Took an Ax (2014, TV film)
- Ricochet (2011, TV film)
- Final Jeopardy (2001, TV film)
- Drowning Mona (2000)
- Illtown (1998)
- New Jersey Drive (1995)
- Laws of Gravity (1992)
