= Laws of Gravity (film) =

1992 film by Nick Gomez

- Film poster
- Directed by: Nick Gomez
- Written by: Nick Gomez
- Produced by: Bob Gosse; Larry Meistrich
- Starring: Peter Greene
- Cinematography: Jean de Segonzac
- Edited by: Tom McArdle
- Production company: Island World
- Distributed by: RKO Pictures
- Release date: March 21, 1992
- Running time: 100 minutes
- Country: United States
- Language: English
- Budget: $38,000

Laws of Gravity is a 1992 American crime drama film written and directed by Nick Gomez and starring Peter Greene.

== Plot ==
Jimmy and Johnny are two Brooklyn street toughs who never made it into workaday society. Danger is the hit that gets them out of bed. Jimmy owes a loan shark money and Johnny is wanted by the police. Things go further out of control when their old friend Frankie arrives in a stolen car with a trunkload of guns for sale.

== Cast ==
- Peter Greene as Jimmy
- Edie Falco as Denise
- Adam Trese as Jon
- Arabella Field as Celia
- Paul Schulze as Frankie
- Saul Stein as Sal
- Tony Fernandez as Tommy
- Larry Meistrich as Pete
- James Michael McCauley as Kenny (credited as James McCauley)
- Rick Groel as Kevin
- Anibal O. Lleras as Rey (credited as Anibel Leirras)
- John Gallagher as Bobby
- David Troup as Sullivan
- Miguel Sierra as Vasquez
- David Tuttle as Ted

== Reception ==
Vincent Canby give the film a positive review in The New York Times, writing that "Mr. Gomez's narrative is bleak, but it is kept in such tight focus, and dramatized with such intensity, that the effect is spellbinding even when the terrifically accomplished actors, all speaking at once, go sailing cheerfully over the top."

On the review aggregator website Rotten Tomatoes, 100% of 7 critics' reviews are positive.
