= Miramax =

American film and television production and distribution company

Miramax, LLC
- Logo used since 2010
- Formerly: Miramax Film Corporation (1979–2010)
- Type: Joint venture
- Industry: Film; Television
- Founded: December 19, 1979; 46 years ago Buffalo, New York, U.S.
- Founders: Harvey Weinstein; Bob Weinstein
- Headquarters: Los Angeles, California, U.S.
- Key people: Jonathan Glickman (CEO); Nasser Al-Khelaifi (chairman); Alexandra Loewy (president, Film); Alix Jaffe (president, Television); Kirby Adams (Head, Physical Production)
- Products: Motion pictures Television programs
- Owners: beIN Media Group (51%) (2016–present); Skydance (49%) (2020–present)
- Number of employees: 100+
- Parent: Walt Disney Studios (1993–2010); Filmyard Holdings (2010–2016); Paramount Pictures (2020–present)
- Divisions: Miramax Television; Miramax Family & Animation
- Website: Official website

Miramax, LLC, formerly known as Miramax Films, is an American film and television production and distribution company currently owned by Qatari state-owned beIN Media Group and Skydance. Based in Los Angeles, California, it was founded in 1979, by brothers Harvey and Bob Weinstein.

Miramax was a leading producer and distributor of independent films until it was acquired by the Walt Disney Company on June 30, 1993. In 2010, Disney sold Miramax to Filmyard Holdings, a joint venture of Colony NorthStar, Tutor-Saliba Corporation and Qatar Investment Authority. In March 2016, Miramax was sold to beIN Media Group, which later sold a 49% stake to ViacomCBS (now known as Skydance) on April 3, 2020.

== History ==
=== Independent era (1979–1993) ===
Miramax was founded as initially Miramax Films by the Weinstein brothers, Harvey and Bob, along with executive Corky Burger in Buffalo, New York, in 1979, and was named by combining the first names of their parents, Miriam and Max. It was created to distribute independent films deemed commercially unfeasible by the major studios.

The company's first major success came when the Weinsteins teamed up with British producer Martin Lewis and acquired the U.S. rights to two concert films Lewis had produced of benefit shows for human rights organization Amnesty International. The Weinsteins worked with Lewis to distill the two films into one film for the American marketplace. The resulting film, the American version of The Secret Policeman's Other Ball, was a successful release for Miramax in the summer of 1982. This release presaged a modus operandi that the company would undertake later in the 1980s of acquiring films from international filmmakers and reworking them to suit American sensibilities and audiences. In its early years, Miramax Films had to focus primarily as a catalyst for music and decided to do a licensing agreement with Thorn EMI Video to release several of Miramax's early films.

Among the company's other breakthrough films as distributors in the late 1980s and early 1990s were Pulp Fiction, Scandal, Sex, Lies, and Videotape, Tie Me Up! Tie Me Down!, The Crying Game, and Clerks. The company also made films such as Flirting with Disaster, Heavenly Creatures, and Shakespeare in Love.

Miramax Films acquired and/or produced many other films that did well financially. The company became one of the leaders of the independent film boom of the 1990s. Miramax Films produced or distributed seven films with box office grosses totaling more than $100 million; its highest grossing title, Chicago, earned more than $300 million worldwide.

The company was also successful in securing Academy Award nominations for its releases, many of which resulted in Oscar wins.

Miramax expanded its empire when the company launched two new labels Millimeter Films in 1988 by Bob Weinstein for genre films, and arthouse label Prestige Films in 1990, run by Mark Lipsky, later replaced by Gerry Rich, and Prestige was eventually folded into Miramax Films.

In 1991, Miramax had bought out the distribution rights to Hellraiser III: Hell on Earth and the Children of the Corn franchise, and as a result, the existing Miramax label Millimeter Films was reconfigured into Dimension Films, and also launched the Miramax Family Films label, designed for children's films. The company also launched a home video label, Miramax Home Video.

=== Disney era (1993–2010) ===
On June 30, 1993, The Walt Disney Company purchased Miramax Films for $60 million and assumed all of the company's debt, which was more than $40 million. The acquisition gave Disney entry to the independent film market. Harvey and Bob Weinstein continued to operate Miramax Films until they left the company on September 30, 2005. During their tenure, the Weinstein brothers ran Miramax Films independently of other Disney subsidiaries and, as a result, had more autonomy than the other Disney-owned companies. Disney, however, had the final say on what Miramax Films could release (for example, Disney had banned Miramax Films from releasing Kids, Dogma and Fahrenheit 9/11). Disney's Buena Vista Home Entertainment division released Miramax output on VHS, DVD, and Blu-ray Disc under the name Miramax Home Entertainment in some countries, including the United States; elsewhere, the overall distribution of Miramax Films' output was passed to the regional licensees of Miramax International, a distribution arm of Miramax Films that was fully autonomous from Disney's own distribution operations.

Miramax is also accused of ignoring their more artistic, less audience-friendly films, especially when directors refuse to re-cut them to make them less challenging. Dead Man, which director Jim Jarmusch refused to re-cut, got a very limited release and critics have accused the Weinsteins of burying the film.

With a more stable budget, Miramax Films began moving beyond acquisitions and distribution and into film production. Until September 30, 2005, the company also operated the label Dimension Films, which was solely founded by Bob to specialize in teen, horror, and other genre films, and created the Scream and Scary Movie film franchises. Harvey funded larger projects from up-and-coming directors, including Robert Rodriguez, Gus Van Sant, and Quentin Tarantino. Some of the films earned Oscars. At times the studio tried to release a film almost weekly.

In 1997, Miramax Films joined Peter Jackson as a primary financial backer in attempting to get the Lord of the Rings films produced. Disney disliked the cost of a two-parter, requesting that it be produced as a single film. Jackson and Saul Zaentz rejected Disney's request and looked for another studio or financier. Thus, Miramax Films sold the rights for The Lord of the Rings and The Hobbit to New Line Cinema in August 1998 for about $12 million, which led The Lord of the Rings to be produced as a trilogy. Miramax Films retained a 5% stake in the films' gross and then gave 2.5% to the Weinsteins. The potential editing of Princess Mononoke (1997) by Miramax has been the subject of rumor. The Guardian's Xan Brooks reported in 2005 that the film's director Hayao Miyazaki was rumored to have sent the then–head of Miramax Harvey Weinstein a samurai sword in the mail with the attached message "No cuts." In response, Miyazaki stated that "Actually, my producer did that." He also claimed that he "defeated" Weinstein's attempts to shorten the film's length. The claim has subsequently appeared in other media coverage. The media scholar Emma Pett wrote in 2018 that Miyazaki was "complicit in the construction of his auteur image" and the perpetuation of the rumor by these responses. The studio executive Steve Alpert wrote in his 2020 memoir that the producer Toshio Suzuki, after procuring a replica sword from a shop in Tokyo, presented it to Weinstein at a meeting in New York. He then "shouted in English and in a loud voice: 'Mononoke-hime, no cut!'"

One reason for the delays and non-releases of films was an accounting scheme that the Weinsteins used to shift potential money-losing films to future fiscal years and ensure they would receive annual bonuses from Disney, while trying to bar retailers from legally exporting authentic DVDs of the films. Defenders of the company point out that, prior to Miramax, most of the films purchased by the company would have had little to no chance of achieving U.S. distribution other than by very small distributors with minimal marketing expertise and funds. They also state that the purpose of the company's aggressive re-editing technique was always to try to help the films find a broader American audience than they might otherwise find. "I'm not cutting for fun", Harvey Weinstein said in an interview, "I'm cutting for the shit to work. All my life I served one master: the film. I love movies."

Through Miramax Films, Harvey founded Talk magazine with Tina Brown in 1998 (it shut down in 2002), albeit without the approval of then-Disney chief Michael Eisner, which upset Eisner. Also that year, 30 former employees filed suit over unpaid overtime wages.

By 2003, Miramax Films was less operative in the independent film market and became more of a mini-major as the company only acquired 3 films while producing Cold Mountain for $80 million. The Weinsteins claimed the company was profitable, but Walt Disney Company president Robert Iger indicated in June 2004 that they were not properly accounting for "account standard overhead, distribution fees, bonuses that we pay Harvey and Bob. Nor are they applying current accounting rules."

After extensive negotiations and much media and industry speculation, on March 30, 2005, Disney and the Weinsteins announced that they would not renew their contractual relationship when their existing agreements expired at the end of September 2005. The primary source of dispute was over distribution of Fahrenheit 9/11 by Michael Moore. Disney's film studio consortium, Buena Vista Motion Pictures Group, assumed control of Miramax Films, which was projected to have a smaller annual production budget. The Weinsteins started a new film production company called The Weinstein Company (TWC) and took the Dimension Films label with them. The Miramax Films name and library remained with the film studio owned by Disney. Production at Miramax Films was taken over by Daniel Battsek, who had been head of Buena Vista International in the UK. Battsek refocused Miramax Films to produce films of high quality but low budget. Maple Pictures held the rights to distribute Miramax films in Canada from 2008 up until August 10, 2011, when Maple Pictures was acquired by Alliance Films. At the time, the company was criticized for delaying or withholding release of Asian films to which it acquired the U.S. distribution rights. Previously, in 2003, the company was criticized for trying to bar retailers from legally exporting authentic DVDs of the films.

On October 3, 2009, Disney announced that the staff of Miramax Films was to be reduced by 70%, and the number of releases would be reduced by half to just three films per year. The label's marketing, distribution, and administrative functions, which had operated independently, would be folded into the parent studio in Burbank. The move became effective in January 2010. On October 30, 2009, Disney announced the resignation of Daniel Battsek as President of Miramax Films, effective when the transition from the studio in New York to Burbank was completed. The company's move of operations to The Walt Disney Studios in Burbank was completed on January 28, 2010, shutting down Miramax Films' separate New York and Los Angeles offices.

Though Disney Studio Chairman Dick Cook was a staunch supporter of Miramax Films, the brand was less of a priority for CEO Bob Iger, whose strategy was to focus on Disney's branded mass entertainment that could be exploited across Disney's theme parks, television, and consumer products. Following Disney's $4 billion acquisition of Marvel Entertainment in 2009, Cook was succeeded by Rich Ross. As a result, Miramax Films was relegated to the status of distribution label within the Walt Disney Company. Disney confirmed that it was looking into selling the Miramax label on February 9, 2010, with Iger explaining "We determined that continuing to invest in new Miramax movies wasn't necessarily a core strategy of ours".

=== Other companies and post-Disney ownership era (2010–2019) ===
On December 3, 2010, Disney closed the sale of Miramax for US$663 million to Filmyard Holdings, an investment group and joint venture of Colony NorthStar, Tutor-Saliba Corporation, and Qatar Investment Authority. The sale included 700 film titles, books, development projects, and the "Miramax" name. Mike Lang, the former News Corporation business development executive who was selected as the CEO of Miramax, indicated that the company would focus on their existing library, though they would continue making original content.

After the sale was closed, some films already developed at Miramax, including The Tempest and Gnomeo & Juliet, were eventually released by Disney under its Touchstone Pictures banner, and theatrical distribution of Don't Be Afraid of the Dark and The Debt were shifted to FilmDistrict and Focus Features respectively.

On December 16, 2013, Miramax entered into a deal with Harvey and Bob Weinstein's The Weinstein Company to develop and distribute select derivative works of films from the former studio. Sequels, television series, or stage productions of titles such as Rounders and Shakespeare in Love were among the projects said to be part of this agreement.

On July 17, 2015, Qatar and Colony NorthStar put Miramax up for sale for an offer of $1 billion. Harvey and Bob Weinstein had reportedly regained interest in reacquiring the studio via TWC in September. On March 2, 2016, Miramax was sold to beIN Media Group, a spinoff of Al Jazeera Media Network (which formerly owned its namesake beIN Sports).

On a July 21, 2016, interview, Harvey Weinstein stated that he was still interested in combining TWC's film library with Miramax's, after the acquisition of Miramax by beIN.

After Miramax's founder Harvey Weinstein was accused of sexual assault in October 2017, Miramax became one of 60 parties bidding on TWC on January 16, 2018. On April 27, Miramax and Lantern Capital emerged as the strongest contenders to acquire TWC's assets. Ultimately, it was Lantern that acquired TWC's library.

On June 7, 2019, beIN began the process of selling approximately 50% of Miramax in an effort to offer it for growth. Lionsgate (which distributed Miramax's titles on home video), Spyglass Media Group (owners of the Weinstein Company library, inherited via their deal with Lantern) and Viacom (Paramount's parent company who re-merged with CBS Corporation on December 4, 2019, to form ViacomCBS) were seen as the leading contenders to acquire a stake in the company. By August 19, 2019, Lionsgate and Viacom were the only contenders, as Spyglass Media Group dropped out of contention. On September 11, 2019, it was announced Lionsgate had dropped their bid, making Viacom the only bidder for the stake in Miramax. On November 8, 2019, Viacom exited the negotiations to acquire them. After merging with CBS Corporation to become ViacomCBS, the combined firm resumed talks with Miramax.

=== Skydance era (2019–present) ===
On December 20, 2019, ViacomCBS (later named Paramount Global) announced it would acquire a 49% stake in Miramax for at least $375 million, with Paramount Pictures gaining exclusive worldwide distribution rights to its film and television library. Paramount Pictures and Miramax will also co-produce new content based on titles from the library. The deal officially closed on April 3, 2020.

On June 24, 2020, Miramax and ViacomCBS announced their first co-production, The Turkish Detective, a television series based on the Cetin Ikmen novels by Barbara Nadel.

On October 2, 2023, it was announced that CEO Bill Block would be leaving the company that week following the end of his contract with them, starting his own production company, BlockFilm, later that month. In January 2024, Jonathan Glickman was reported to be in talks to join Miramax as CEO, with his company Panoramic Media expected to be acquired by Miramax if talks were successful. On April 2, 2024, Glickman was officially named Miramax's new CEO effective immediately. As part of the deal, Miramax also acquired certain film and television projects from Glickman's company Panoramic Media.

Following the acquisition of Warner Bros. Discovery by Paramount Skydance, Paramount agreed to a five-year consent decree which included releasing 30 films per-year for two years, and then at least 32 films for the next three years afterwards. If Paramount failed to meet the quota, the company will be required to divest its stake in Miramax.

== Divisions ==
=== Miramax Family & Animation ===
Miramax Family & Animation
- Type: Division
- Industry: Animation; Motion pictures
- Founded: December 16, 1991; 34 years ago (original); March 18, 2019; 7 years ago (revival)
- Defunct: June 2006; 20 years ago (original)
- Headquarters: United States
- Parent: Miramax

Miramax Family Films is the family division of Miramax Films, founded on December 16, 1991 and solidifed its foundation on September 2, 1993. After the Weinstein brothers left Miramax on September 30, 2005, the label was quietly discontinued in June 2006. After The Weinstein Company was completely shut down along with its website on July 16, 2018, Miramax revived its family and animation divisions, with both being founded as separate divisions within the company on March 18, 2019.

Michael Lachance, who had previously developed projects at DreamWorks Animation and Sony Pictures Animation, was named the division's executive vice president.

== Filmography ==
=== Film series ===
Title	Release date	Notes
Hellraiser	1992–2005	based on the novella The Hellbound Heart by Clive Barker; distribution under Dimension Films label
Children of the Corn	1993–2001	based on the short story of the same name by Stephen King; distribution under Dimension Films label
Three Colours	1993–1994	United States distribution only
The Crow	1994–2005	distribution under Dimension Films label
View Askewniverse	1994–2001; 2019	2001: distribution under Dimension Films label 2019: co-production
Best of the Best	1995–1998	distribution under Dimension Films label
The Prophecy	1995–2005	distribution under Dimension Films label
Halloween	1995–2002; 2018–present	1995–2002: distribution under Dimension Films label 2018–present: co-production
From Dusk till Dawn	1996–2000	distribution under Dimension Films label
Police Story	1996–1999	United States distribution only under Dimension Films label
Jungledyret Hugo (the first two movies: Go Hugo Go (1993) and Hugo the Movie Star (1996))	1998 (produced); 2005 (released)	United States distribution only
Scream	1996–2000	1996–2000: distribution under Dimension Films label
Operation Condor	1997	distribution under Dimension Films label
Mimic	1997–2003	distribution under Dimension Films label
Bounty Hunters	1997–2001	United States distribution only under Dimension Films label
Air Bud	1998–2003	United States distribution only under Dimension Films label; marketed under the Disney banner (Note: When Disney purchased Air Bud for an estimated $6 million for domestic rights and rights to sequels, the rights were through then-subsidiary Miramax Films; however, sometime during development, the first installment was moved to the Walt Disney Pictures label when it released in 1997, and the rights to all were retained by Disney following its sale of Miramax in 2010.)
She's All That	1999; 2021	
Asterix and Obelix	1999–2002	based on the comic book series of the same name by René Goscinny and Albert Uderzo; Italy distribution only
Scary Movie	2000–present	2000–2003: distribution under Dimension Films label; 2006: international distribution under Buena Vista International; 2025: distribution under Paramount Pictures
Dracula	2000–2005	distribution under Dimension Films label
Spy Kids	2001–2003	distribution under Dimension Films label
Bridget Jones	2001–present	based on the novel series of the same name by Helen Fielding; 2001: United States distribution only 2004, 2016 & 2025: co-production
Iron Monkey	2001–2002	
Pokémon: The Movie	2001–2004	based on the multimedia franchise of the same name by The Pokémon Company; distribution outside Asia only
Bionicle	2003–2005	based on the toyline of the same name by The Lego Group
Kill Bill	2003–2004	
Bad Santa	2003–2016	2003: United States distribution only under Dimension Films label 2016: co-production
Sin City (also known as Frank Miller's Sin City)	2005–2014	based on the comic book series of the same name by Frank Miller; 2005: distribution under Dimension Films label 2014: co-production

=== Highest-grossing films ===
Rank	Title	Year	Worldwide Gross
1	Chicago	2002	$306,776,732
2	Shakespeare in Love	1998	$289,317,794
3	Bridget Jones's Diary	2001	$281,929,795
4	Bridget Jones: The Edge of Reason	2004	$278,000,000
5	Halloween	2018	$259,939,869
6	The English Patient	1996	$231,976,425
7	Life Is Beautiful	1997	$230,099,013
8	Good Will Hunting	1997	$225,933,435
9	Pulp Fiction	1994	$213,928,762
10	The Aviator	2004	$213,719,942
11	Bridget Jones's Baby	2016	$211,952,420
12	Master and Commander: The Far Side of the World	2003	$211,622,535
13	Gangs of New York	2002	$193,772,504
14	Kill Bill: Volume 1	2003	$180,899,045
15	Scary Movie 4	2006	$178,262,620
16	Hero	2002	$177,395,557
17	Amélie	2001	$175,055,109
18	Cold Mountain	2003	$173,013,509
19	No Country for Old Men	2007	$171,632,777
20	Princess Mononoke	1997	$170,323,393
21	Shall We Dance	2004	$170,128,460
22	Kill Bill: Volume 2	2004	$154,118,514
23	The Beekeeper	2024	$152,720,535
24	Chocolat	2000	$152,700,626
25	Halloween Kills	2021	$133,000,000

Films and TV shows distributed by Miramax Family are listed here:

- Freddie as F.R.O.7 (1992)
- Tom and Jerry: The Movie (1992) (US theatrical distribution only; home media distributed by Warner Bros. Discovery Home Entertainment)
- Into the West (1993)
- Go Hugo Go (1993)
- The Thief and the Cobbler (1993) (originally released in cinemas as Arabian Knight)
- Little Buddha (1994)
- Gordy (1994)
- The NeverEnding Story III: Escape from Fantasia (1996) (US release only)
- Hugo the Movie Star (1996)
- Microcosmos (1996)
- How the Toys Saved Christmas (1997)
- The Phoenix and the Carpet (1997)
- Children of Heaven (1997)
- Princess Mononoke (1997) (North American distribution only)
- The Animal Train (1998)
- Wide Awake (1998)
- The Mighty (1998)
- The Bear (1998)
- Flipper & Lopaka (1999–2005)
- Asterix & Obelix Take On Caesar (2000)
- Pokémon 4Ever (2001)
- On the Line (2001)
- The Adventures of Tom Thumb and Thumbelina (2002)
- Asterix & Obelix: Mission Cleopatra (2002)
- Beyblade: Fierce Battle (2002)
- Pokémon Heroes (2002)
- The Best of Tokyo Pig (2002)
- Pinocchio (2002)
- Warriors of Virtue: The Return to Tao (2002)
- A Wrinkle in Time (2003)
- Bionicle: The Movie – Mask of Light (2003)
- Pokémon: Jirachi—Wish Maker (2003)
- MXP: Most Extreme Primate (2003)
- Shaolin Soccer (2004)
- Ella Enchanted (2004)
- Chestnut: Hero of Central Park (2004) (DVD only)
- Pokémon: Destiny Deoxys (2004)
- Bionicle 2: Legends of Metru Nui (2004)
- Finding Neverland (2004)
- In Search of Santa (2004)
- Paul McCartney: Music & Animation (2004)
- Bionicle 3: Web of Shadows (2005)
- My Scene Goes Hollywood: The Movie (2005)
- Spymate (2006)

== Miramax Television ==
Miramax Television
- Type: Division
- Industry: Television production
- Founded: 1987; 39 years ago
- Headquarters: Los Angeles, California, U.S.
- Key people: Marc Helwig (EVP)
- Parent: Miramax

Miramax Television is the television production division founded in 1987, assigned to producing television shows based on the existing Miramax film library and original concepts. Although Miramax produced its series as early as 1987, Miramax expanded its foray into game shows with an attempted version of What's My Line? in 1996, followed by a proper television division in 1998. In 2001, Mort Marcus became chairman of the company, only to leave in 2002 to reestablish Debmar Studios.

=== Filmography ===
Title	Years	Network	Notes
The World of David the Gnome	1987	T.V.E./Nick Jr.	English dub only; co-production with CINAR for BRB Internacional
Wasteland	1999	ABC	co-production with Outerbanks Entertainment
Clerks: The Animated Series	2000–2002	ABC (2000); Comedy Central (2002)	co-production with View Askew Productions, Woltz International Pictures Corporation, Touchstone Television and Walt Disney Television Animation (uncredited); based on the film Clerks
Project Greenlight	2001–2015	HBO (2001–2003, 2015); Bravo (2005)	co-production with Adaptive Studios, LivePlanet (seasons 1–3) and Pearl Street Films (season 4)
Glory Days	2002	The WB	co-production with Dimension Television and Outerbanks Entertainment
Tokyo Pig	2002–2003	ABC Family	English dub only; co-production with Studio E Productions and Buena Vista Sound Services
Semi-Homemade Cooking with Sandra Lee	2003	Food Network	co-production with Follow Productions
Project Runway	2004–2011	Bravo (2004–2008); Lifetime (2009–2011)	seasons 1–9 only; co-production with Full Picture Productions, Heidi Klum Productions (seasons 2–9), Magical Elves Productions (seasons 2–9), The Weinstein Company Television (seasons 2–9) and Bunim/Murray Productions (seasons 6–9)
From Dusk till Dawn: The Series	2014–2016	El Rey Network	co-production with Sugarcane Entertainment, FactoryMade Ventures, and Rodriguez International Pictures; based on the film From Dusk till Dawn
Crow's Blood	2017	El Rey Network	international distribution
Gone Baby Gone	2018	N/A	co-production with 20th Century Fox Television; unaired TV pilot; based on the film Gone Baby Gone
Spy City	2020	Magenta TV; AMC+	co-production with Odeon Fiction; miniseries
Project Greenlight: A New Generation	2023	Max	co-production with Hoorae Media, 3 Arts Entertainment and Alfred Street Industries; revival of the original 2001 series
The Turkish Detective	2023	Paramount+	co-production with Ay Yapin and Paramount Television International Studios; based on the novel The Turkish Detective
The Gentlemen	2024–present	Netflix	co-production with Moonage Pictures; based on the film The Gentlemen
City of God: The Fight Rages On	2024–present	HBO	co-production with O2 Filmes; based on the film City of God
Mimic	TBA	Apple TV	based on the film Mimic
The Henna Artist	TBA	Netflix	co-production with Freebird Films; based on the book The Henna Artist
The Rise and Fall of Little Voice	TBA	Pluto TV	co-production with Happy Prince; based on the play The Rise and Fall of Little Voice
Untitled Confessions of a Dangerous Mind series	TBA	Apple TV	co-production with Paramount Television Studios; based on the film Confessions of a Dangerous Mind and the book of the same name
Bloom County	TBA	Fox	co-production with Fox Entertainment, Bento Box Entertainment, Spyglass Media Group and Project X Entertainment; based on the comic strip Bloom County
Prêt-à-Porter	TBA	BBC	based on the film Prêt-à-Porter
The Gangs of New York	TBA	Paramount+	based on the book The Gangs of New York
Chocolat	TBA	MGM+	co-production with Mediawan; based on the film Chocolat
Cop Land	TBA	Paramount+	co-production with Paramount Television Studios; based on the film Cop Land
The English Patient	TBA	Netflix	based on the film The English Patient
Shall We Dance?	TBA	Amazon Prime Video	based on the film Shall We Dance?
The Holdovers	TBA	TBA	co-production with Universal Television; based on the film The Holdovers
The Christie Affair	TBA	TBA	co-production with The Gotham Group; based on the novel The Christie Affair
The Immortals	TBA	TBA	co-production with Mediawan; based on the novel The Immortals
The Key Man	TBA	TBA	based on the book The Key Man
The Maidens	TBA	TBA	co-production with Stone Village; based on the book The Maidens
Untitled Halloween series	TBA	TBA	co-production with Trancas International Films; based on the film Halloween
