= Billy Bob Thornton filmography =

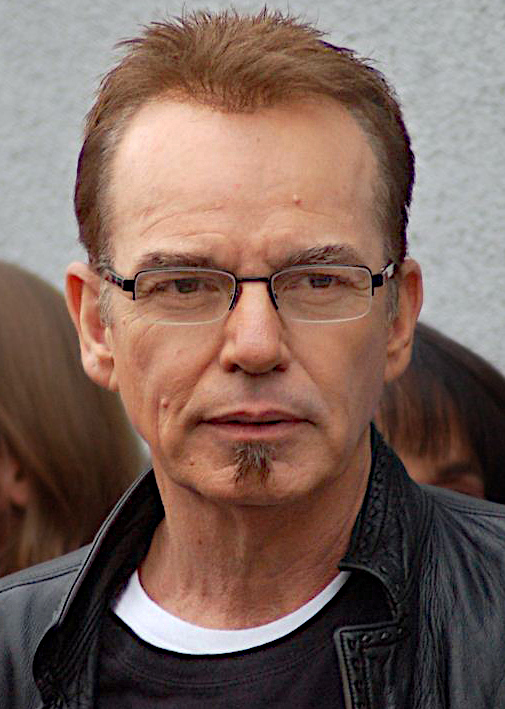
- Occupations: Actor; filmmaker; singer; songwriter
- Years active: 1986–present

The following is the filmography of American actor, filmmaker, singer and songwriter Billy Bob Thornton.

== Film ==
Year	Title	Role	Notes
1986	Hunter's Blood	Billy Bob	
1988	South of Reno	Counterman	
1989	Going Overboard	Dave	
1989	Chopper Chicks in Zombietown	Donny	
1991	The Dark Backward	Patron At Sloppy's	Uncredited
1991	For the Boys	Marine Sergeant In Korea	
1991	Widespread Panic: Live from the Georgia Theatre	—N/a	Short film; Director only
1992	One False Move	Ray Malcolm	Also writer
1993	Tombstone	Johnny Tyler	
1993	Blood In Blood Out	'Lightning'	
1993	Indecent Proposal	Day Tripper	
1993	Ghost Brigade	Langston	
1993	Trouble Bound	'Coldface'	
1994	On Deadly Ground	Homer Carlton	
1994	Floundering	Gun Clerk	
1994	Some Folks Call It a Sling Blade	Karl Childers	Short film; Also writer
1995	Dead Man	George 'Big George' Drakoulious	
1995	The Stars Fell on Henrietta	Roy	
1996	Sling Blade	Karl Childers	Also writer/director
1996	The Winner	Jack	
1996	A Family Thing	—N/a	Writer only
1997	The Apostle	Troublemaker	
1997	U Turn	Darrell	
1997	Princess Mononoke	Jigo	Voice only (English language dub)
1997	Burn Hollywood Burn	Himself	Cameo
1998	A Simple Plan	Jacob Mitchell	
1998	Armageddon	Dan Truman	
1998	Homegrown	Jack Marsden	
1998	Primary Colors	Richard Jemmons	
1998	The Thin Red Line	Narrator	Material deleted
1999	Pushing Tin	Russell Bell	
2000	The Gift	—N/a	Writer only
2000	The Last Real Cowboys	Tar	Short films; Also writer
2000	All the Pretty Horses	—N/a	Producer/director only
2001	South of Heaven, West of Hell	Brigadier General Smalls	
2001	Daddy and Them	Claude Montgomery	Also writer/director
2001	Monster's Ball	Hank Grotowski	
2001	Bandits	Terry Lee Collins	
2001	The Man Who Wasn't There	Ed Crane	
2001	Camouflage	—N/a	Writer only (credited as Reginald Perry)
2002	Waking Up in Reno	Lonnie Earl Dodd	Also producer
2002	The Badge	Sheriff Darl Hardwick	
2003	Bad Santa	Willie Soke	
2003	Love Actually	President of the U.S.	
2003	Intolerable Cruelty	Howard D. Doyle	
2003	Levity	Manuel Jordan	
2004	Friday Night Lights	Coach Gary Gaines	
2004	The Alamo	Davy Crockett	
2004	Chrystal	Joe	
2005	The Ice Harvest	Vic Cavanaugh	
2005	Bad News Bears	Coach Morris Buttermaker	
2006	School for Scoundrels	Dr. P. / Dennis Sherman	
2007	The Astronaut Farmer	Charles Farmer	
2007	Mr. Woodcock	Jasper Woodcock	
2008	Eagle Eye	FBI Agent Thomas Morgan	
2008	The Informers	William	
2009	My Run	Narrator	Voice only; Documentary
2009	The Smell of Success	Patrick	
2010	Faster	Detective Slade Humphries / Cop	
2011	The King of Luck	—N/a	Documentary; Director only
2011	Nashville Rises	Narrator	Voice only; Documentary
2011	Puss in Boots	Jack	Voice only
2013	Jayne Mansfield's Car	Skip Caldwell	Also writer/director
2013	The Baytown Outlaws	Carlos	
2013	Parkland	Forrest Sorrels	
2014	Cut Bank	Stan Steeley	
2014	The Judge	Dwight Dickham	
2015	Into the Grizzly Maze	Douglas	
2015	Entourage	Larsen McCredle	
2015	Our Brand Is Crisis	Pat Candy	
2016	Whiskey Tango Foxtrot	General Hollanek	
2016	Bad Santa 2	Willie Soke	
2018	London Fields	Samson Young	
2018	A Million Little Pieces	Leonard	
2022	The Gray Man	Donald Fitzroy	
2023	Devil's Peak	Charlie	
2024	Standing on the Shoulders of Kitties	Himself	
TBA	Somedays	TBA	

== Television ==
Year	Title	Role	Notes
1987	Matlock	Pawnshop clerk	Episode: "The Photographer"
1988	Circus	Billy Bob	Pilot
1990	The Outsiders	'Buck' Merill	10 episodes
1990	Evening Shade	Florist	Episode: "There Once Was a Boy Named Wood"
1992	Knots Landing	Timberman	Episode: "Letting Go"
1992–1995	Hearts Afire	Billy Bob Davis	54 episodes
1995	Out There	Jailbird	Television film
1996	Don't Look Back	Marshall	Television film; also writer
1997	Ellen	The Grocer	Episode: "The Puppy Episode: Part 2"
1998	King of the Hill	Boyce Hubert (voice)	Episode: "Nine Pretty Darn Angry Men"
2001, 2005	CatDog	CatDog's Father (Frog) (voice)	2 episodes
2014	Fargo	Lorne Malvo	10 episodes
2014	Robot Chicken	Grandpappy Schlorp (voice)	Episode: "Bitch Pudding Special"
2014	The Big Bang Theory	Dr. Oliver Lorvis	Episode: "The Misinterpretation Agitation"
2016	American Dad!	Himself (voice)	Episode: "N.S.A. (No Snooping Allowed)"
2016–2021	Goliath	Billy McBride	32 episodes
2017	Fargo	Narrator (voice)	Episode: "The Narrow Escape Problem"
2021	1883	Marshal Jim Courtright	Episode: "Behind Us, a Cliff"
2022	Harley Quinn	Himself (voice)	Episode: "The 83rd Annual Villy Awards"
2024–present	Landman	Tommy Norris	Main role

== Video games ==
Year	Title	Voice role
2009	Deadly Creatures	Wade

== See also ==
- List of awards and nominations received by Billy Bob Thornton
- Billy Bob Thornton discography

== Bibliography ==
- "Billy Bob Thornton – Filmography". AllMovie. AMN. allmovie.com.
- "Billy Bob Thornton – Filmography". Rotten Tomatoes. Flixster. rottentomatoes.com.
- "Billy Bob Thornton – Filmography". Film Reference. Advameg. filmreference.com.
