= Billy Bob Thornton discography =

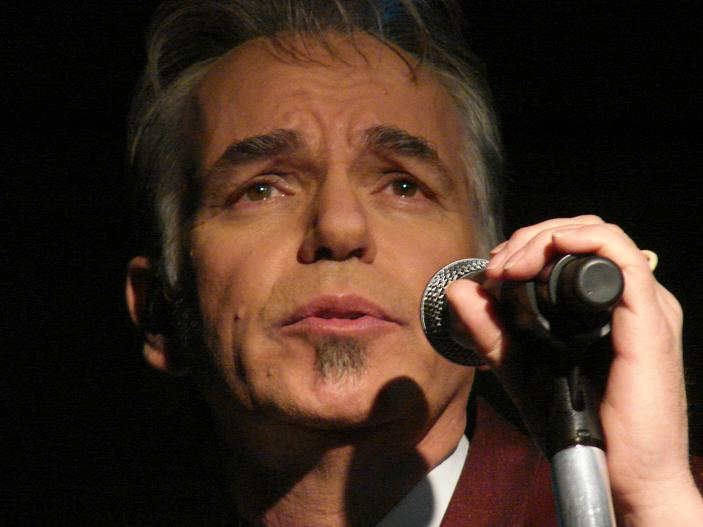
- Thornton performing live at Ramshead Annapolis on August 22, 2008
- Studio albums: 16
- EPs: 1
- Singles: 2
- Promotional singles: 1
- Other songs: 3

American actor and singer-songwriter Billy Bob Thornton has released sixteen studio albums, two singles, and one EP. Thornton founded the band The Boxmasters in 2007, with which he has released several albums.

== Albums ==
=== Studio albums ===
As main artist

Year	Album
2001	Private Radio: Release date: September 25, 2001; Record label: Lost Highway (#170 236); Format: CD
2003	The Edge of the World: Release date: August 19, 2003; Record label: Sanctuary (#SANCD212); Format: CD
2005	Hobo: Release date: September 13, 2005; Record label: Big Deal (#BDR 8981); Format: CD
2007	Beautiful Door: Release date: July 24, 2007; Record label: New Door (#B0009108); Format: CD

As featured artist

Year	Album
2008	The Boxmasters with The Boxmasters: Release date: June 10, 2008; Record label: Sawmill (#79862); Format: 2xLP, 2xCD
2008	Christmas Cheer (holiday album) with The Boxmasters: Release date: November 11, 2008; Record label: Vanguard (#); Format: CD
2009	Modbilly with The Boxmasters: Release date: April 21, 2009; Record label: Vanguard (#79926); Format: 2xLP, 2xCD
2015	Somewhere Down the Road with The Boxmasters: Release date: 2015; Record label: 101 Ranch (#Unknown); Format: 2xCD
2015	Providence with The Boxmasters: Release date: 2015; Record label: self-released, exclusively available via theboxmasters.com; Format: Digital download
2016	Boys And Girls... And The World with The Boxmasters: Release date: 2016; Record label: NDR Records; Format: 2xCD
2016	Tea Surfing with The Boxmasters: Release date: 2016; Record label: NDR Records; Format 1xCD
2018	In Stereo! with The Boxmasters: Release date: 2018; Record label: NDR Records; Format 1xCD
2019	Speck with The Boxmasters: Release date: 2019; Record label: Keentone Records; Format 1xCD
2020	Light Rays with The Boxmasters: Release date: 2020; Record label: Keentone Records; Format 1xCD
2021	Christmas in California with The Boxmasters: Release date: 2021
2022	Help...I'm Alive with The Boxmasters: Release date: 2022

== EPs ==
Year	Album	Notes
2006	NapsterLive – August 18, 2005: Release date: January 24, 2006; Record label: Big Deal (#Unknown); Format: CD	Three-track EP featuring live recordings of the songs "Hobo", "I Used to Be a Lion" and "That Mountain".

== Singles ==
Year	Song	Album
2007	"Hearts Like Mine"	Beautiful Door
2009	"The Poor House" with The Boxmasters	The Boxmasters

=== Promotional singles ===
Year	Song	Album
2001	"Angelina"	Private Radio

== Other songs ==
Year	Song	Notes
2001	"Ring of Fire" (featuring Earl Scruggs)	A cover of a Johnny Cash classic released on Southern Music CD by Oxford American.
2004	"The Wind"	Appears on tribute album to Warren Zevon Enjoy Every Sandwich, released on Artemis.
2007	Road To Kaintuck" (featuring The Peasall Sisters)	Appears on tribute album to June Carter Cash Anchored In Love.
2010	"Sylvia's Mother" (with The Boxmasters)	Appears on tribute album to Shel Silverstein Twistable, Turnable Man, released on Sugar Hill.
2015	"Raisin' Cain"	Single by Mark Collie.
2023	"The River Only Flows One Way (song)"	Appears on the album Peace... Like a River by Gov't Mule.

== See also ==
- List of awards and nominations received by Billy Bob Thornton
- Billy Bob Thornton filmography
