= Home for Christmas =

Home for Christmas may refer to:

== Music ==
=== Albums ===
- Home for Christmas (BarlowGirl album), a 2008 album by American Christian rock band BarlowGirl
- Home for Christmas (Debby Boone album), a 1989 album by American pop singer Debby Boone
- Home for Christmas (Susan Boyle album), a 2013 album by Scottish operatic pop singer Susan Boyle
- Home for Christmas (George Canyon album), a 2005 album by Canadian country music singer George Canyon
- Home for Christmas (Sheryl Crow album). a 2008 album by American pop rock singer Sheryl Crow
- Home for Christmas (Amy Grant album), 1992 album by Christian and pop music singer Amy Grant
- Home for Christmas (Hall & Oates album), a 2006 album by American pop rock duo Daryl Hall & John Oates
- Home for Christmas (Military Wives album), a 2016 album by the British choir Military Wives
- Home for Christmas (NSYNC album), a 1998 album by American boy band NSYNC
- Home for Christmas (Dolly Parton album), a 1990 album by American country singer-songwriter Dolly Parton
- Home for Christmas (John Schneider and Tom Wopat album), a 2014 album by duet album by American country singers John Schneider and Tom Wopat
- Home for Christmas (Luther Vandross album), a 2001 a repackaging of American R&B singer Luther Vandross's 1995 album This Is Christmas
- Home for Christmas (Celtic Woman album), a 2012 album by Irish new age/pop musical ensemble Celtic Woman

=== Songs ===
- "Home for Christmas" (Danity Kane song), a 2006 single by American girl group Danity Kane
- "Home for Christmas", a 1993 song by English art pop singer Kate Bush that is the B-side on both the "Rubberband Girl" and "Moments of Pleasure" singles

== Film ==
- Home for Christmas (1975 film), a Finnish film
- Little Miss Millions, a 1993 film starring Jennifer Love Hewitt, also known as Home for Christmas
- Home for Christmas (2010 film), a Norwegian film

== Television ==
- Home for Christmas (TV series), a 2019 Norwegian TV series

=== Episodes ===
- "Home for Christmas", All of Us season 2, episode 10 (2004)
- "Home for Christmas", Benson season 6, episode 13 (1984)
- "Home for Christmas", Casualty series 30, episode 16 (2015)
- "Home for Christmas", Ed season 4, episode 11 (2003)
- "Home for Christmas", Little Men season 2, episode 13 (1999)
- "Home for Christmas", Riptide (American) season 3, episode 9 (1985)
- "Home for Christmas (Part 1)" and "(Part 2)", Saved by the Bell season 3, episodes 24–25 (1991)
- "Home for Christmas", Teen Mom 2 season 2, episode 5 (2012)
- "Home for Christmas", The Beverly Hillbillies season 1, episode 13 (1962)
- "Home for Christmas", The New Leave It to Beaver season 2, episode 16 (1986)
- "Home for Christmas", The Roy Rogers and Dale Evans Show episode 13 (1962)
- "Home for Christmas", The Wonder Years (2021) season 1, episode 9 (2021)
- "Home for Christmas", When Calls the Heart special 5 (2019)

== Literature ==
- Home for Christmas, a 1982 novel by Helen Conrad under the pen name Jena Hunt
- Home for Christmas, a 1986 novella by Nora Roberts
- Home for Christmas, a 1987 children's book by Howard Bahr
- Home for Christmas, a 1994 novel by Francine Pascal; the eighth installment of the Sweet Valley University series
- Home for Christmas, a 1996 short story anthology by Debbie Macomber, Anne McAllister and Shannon Waverly
- Home for Christmas, a 1997 novel by Anita Stansfield
- Home for Christmas, a 2001 omnibus of four novellas by Colleen Coble, Carol Cox, Terry Fowler and Gail Gaymer Martin
- Home for Christmas, a 2005 novel by Carrie Weaver
- Home for Christmas, a 2009 novel by Andrew M. Greeley
- Home for Christmas, a 2011 novel by Victor J. Banis
- Home for Christmas, a 2011 novel by Penny Jordan under the pen name Annie Groves
- Home for Christmas, a 2011 novel by Cally Taylor
- Home for Christmas, a 2012 novel by Patricia Kay
- Home for Christmas, a 2013 novel by Jessica Burkhart
- Home for Christmas, a 2013 novel by Anne Marie Rodgers
- Home for Christmas, a 2013 omnibus of two novellas by JoAnn Ross and Jessica Scott
- Home for Christmas, a 2015 novel by Louisa Edwards under the pen name Lily Everett
- Home for Christmas, a 2015 novel by Ruth Ryan Langan
- Home for Christmas, a 2017 novella by Ruth Reid, featured in the omnibus volume An Amish Christmas Love
- Home for Christmas, a 2017 memoir by Alice Taylor

== See also ==
- Coming Home for Christmas
- "Driving Home for Christmas"
- I'll Be Home for Christmas (disambiguation)
- "I Won't Be Home for Christmas"
