= List of awards and nominations received by Billy Bob Thornton =

Billy Bob Thornton awards and nominations
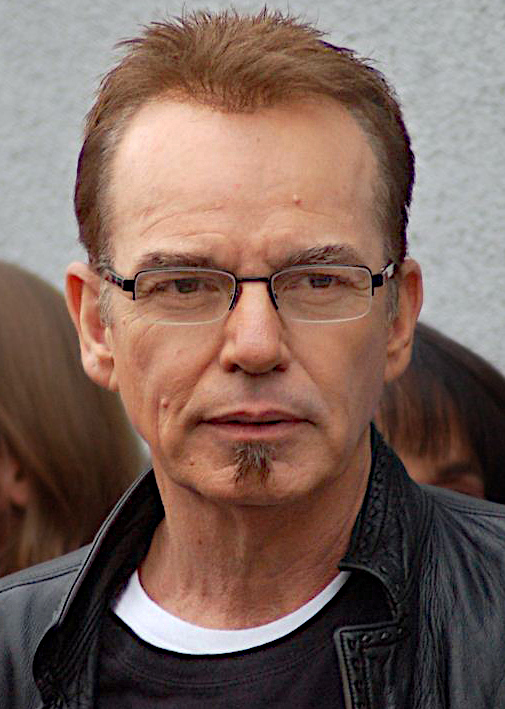
- Thornton in February 2012
Totals
Award	Wins	Nominations
Academy Awards	1	3
AFI Awards	0	1
BIFF Awards	0	1
BE Awards	0	1
BSFC Awards	1	2
COFCA Awards	0	1
CFCA Awards	2	2
CIFF Awards	1	1
CFF Awards	1	1
Crime Thriller Awards	0	1
Critics' Choice Movie Awards	2	2
DFWFCA Awards	0	1
DVD Exclusive Awards	0	1
Edgar Awards	1	1
Primetime Emmy Awards	0	2
Empire Awards	0	1
Fantasporto Awards	1	1
FFCC Awards	1	1
Golden Globe Awards	2	6
HWF Awards	1	1
Humanitas Prizes	0	1
Independent Spirit Awards	1	2
KCFCC Awards	1	1
LVFCS Awards	0	1
LFCC Awards	1	1
LAFCA Awards	1	1
NBR Awards	2	2
NSFC Awards	0	1
OFTA Awards	1	5
OFCS Awards	2	2
PFF Awards	0	1
PFCS Awards	0	2
RGFC Awards	1	1
SDFCS Awards	1	1
Satellite Awards	0	6
Saturn Awards	1	4
Screen Actors Guild Awards	0	3
SEFCA Awards	1	2
Teen Choice Awards	0	1
WAFCA Awards	1	1
Writers Guild of America Awards	1	1
Wins	27
Nominations	69

The following article is a list of awards and nominations received by Billy Bob Thornton.

Thornton has received several awards including two Golden Globe Awards as well as nominations for three Academy Awards, two Emmy Awards, and four Screen Actors Guild Awards.

Thornton won the Academy Award for Best Adapted Screenplay for Sling Blade (1996). He was nominated for Best Actor for playing a developmentally disabled man in Sling Bade and Academy Award for Best Supporting Actor for playing one of two brothers who discover a downed plane in A Simple Plan (1998). He was Golden Globe Award-nominated for his roles in A Simple Plan (1998), The Man Who Wasn't There (2001), Bandits (2001), and Bad Santa (2003). He has also received three nominations for the Screen Actors Guild Award.

On television, he portrayed Lorne Malvo in the first season of the FX television series Fargo (2014). For his performance he won the Golden Globe Award for Best Actor – Miniseries or Television Film and was nominated for the Primetime Emmy Award for Outstanding Lead Actor in a Limited or Anthology Series or Movie. He was further Globe-nominated for playing an alcoholic lawyer in the Amazon Prime Video legal series Goliath (2016–2021) and a landman in the Paramount+ drama series Landman (2024).

== Major associations ==
=== Academy Awards ===
Year	Category	Nominated work	Result	Ref.
1997	Best Adapted Screenplay	Sling Blade	Won	
1997	Best Actor	Sling Blade	Nominated	
1999	Best Supporting Actor	A Simple Plan	Nominated	

=== Emmy Awards ===
Year	Category	Nominated work	Result	Ref.
Daytime Emmy Awards
1999	Outstanding Special Class Special	Film Preservation Classics^{[D]}	Nominated	
Primetime Emmy Awards
2014	Outstanding Lead Actor in a Miniseries or Movie	Fargo	Nominated	

=== Golden Globe Awards ===
Year	Category	Nominated work	Result	Ref.
1999	Best Supporting Actor – Motion Picture	A Simple Plan	Nominated	
2002	Best Actor – Motion Picture Drama	The Man Who Wasn't There	Nominated	
2002	Best Actor – Motion Picture Musical or Comedy	Bandits	Nominated	
2004	Best Actor – Motion Picture Musical or Comedy	Bad Santa	Nominated	
2015	Best Actor – Miniseries or Television Film	Fargo	Won	
2017	Best Actor – Television Series Drama	Goliath	Won	
2025	Best Actor – Television Series Drama	Landman	Nominated	

=== Screen Actors Guild Awards ===
Year	Category	Nominated work	Result	Ref.
1997	Outstanding Performance by a Cast^{[H]}	Sling Blade	Nominated	
1997	Outstanding Actor in a Leading Role	Sling Blade	Nominated	
1999	Outstanding Actor in a Supporting Role	A Simple Plan	Nominated	
2015	Outstanding Actor in a Miniseries or Television Movie	Fargo	Nominated	

== Miscellaneous awards ==
Organizations	Year	Category	Work	Result	Ref.
American Film Institute Awards	2001	Actor of the Year – Male – Movies	The Man Who Wasn't There	Nominated	
Berlin International Film Festival	2012	Golden Bear	Jayne Mansfield's Car	Nominated	
Blockbuster Entertainment Awards	1999	Favorite Supporting Actor – Adventure/Sci-Fi	Armageddon	Nominated	
Chicago International Film Festival	1996	Special Jury Prize (Director)	Sling Blade	Won	
Cinequest Film Festival	2001	Maverick Tribute Award	Himself	Honored^{[B]}	
Crime Thriller Awards	2014	Best Supporting Actor	Fargo	Nominated	
DVD Exclusive Awards	2002	Best Audio Commentary: New Release	The Man Who Wasn't There	Nominated^{[C]}	
Edgar Awards	1997	Best Motion Picture	Sling Blade	Won	
Empire Awards	2001	Best Actor	The Man Who Wasn't There	Nominated	
Fantasporto Awards	1992	International Fantasy Film Award – Best Screenplay	One False Move	Won^{[E]}	
Hollywood Walk of Fame	2004	Motion Pictures Star	Himself	Honored	
Humanitas Prizes	1996	Feature Film Category	A Family Thing	Nominated^{[E]}	
Independent Spirit Awards	1992	Best Screenplay	One False Move	Nominated^{[E]}	
Independent Spirit Awards	1996	Best First Feature	Sling Blade	Won^{[F]}	
Paris Film Festival	2001	Grand Prix	All the Pretty Horses	Nominated	
Satellite Awards	1996	Best Motion Picture Screenplay – Original	Sling Blade	Nominated	
Satellite Awards	1996	Best Actor in a Motion Picture – Drama	Sling Blade	Nominated	
Satellite Awards	1998	Best Supporting Actor in a Motion Picture – Drama	A Simple Plan	Nominated	
Satellite Awards	2001	Best Actor in a Motion Picture – Drama	Monster's Ball	Nominated	
Satellite Awards	2003	Best Actor in a Motion Picture – Comedy or Musical	Bad Santa	Nominated	
Satellite Awards	2015	Best Actor – Television Series Drama	Fargo	Nominated	
Satellite Awards	2019	Best Actor in a Drama / Genre Series	Goliath	Nominated	
Saturn Awards	1996	The President's Memorial Award	Himself	Honored	
Saturn Awards	1999	Best Supporting Actor	A Simple Plan	Nominated	
Saturn Awards	2001	Best Writing	The Gift	Nominated^{[E]}	
Saturn Awards	2002	Best Actor	The Man Who Wasn't There	Nominated	
Teen Choice Awards	2004	Choice Movie: Villain	Bad Santa	Nominated	
Writers Guild of America Awards	1997	Best Adapted Screenplay	Sling Blade	Won	

== Critics awards ==
Organizations	Year	Category	Work	Result	Ref.
Boston Society of Film Critics	1996	Best New Filmmaker	Sling Blade	Runner-up	
Boston Society of Film Critics	1998	Best Supporting Actor	A Simple Plan	Tie^{[A]}	
Central Ohio Film Critics Association	2003	Best Actor	Bad Santa	Nominated	
Chicago Film Critics Association	1996	Best Actor	Sling Blade	Won	
Chicago Film Critics Association	1998	Best Supporting Actor	A Simple Plan	Won	
Critics' Choice Movie Awards	1999	Best Supporting Actor	A Simple Plan	Won	
Critics' Choice Movie Awards	1999	Best Supporting Actor	Primary Colors	Won	
Critics' Choice Television Awards	2014	Best Actor in a Movie/Miniseries	Fargo	Won	
Dallas–Fort Worth Film Critics Association	2001	Best Actor	The Man Who Wasn't There	Runner-up	
Florida Film Critics Circle	2001	Best Actor	Bandits	Won	
Florida Film Critics Circle	2001	Best Actor	The Man Who Wasn't There	Won	
Florida Film Critics Circle	2001	Best Actor	Monster's Ball	Won	
Kansas City Film Critics Circle	1996	Best Actor	Sling Blade	Won	
Las Vegas Film Critics Society	2001	Sierra Award – Best Actor	The Man Who Wasn't There	Nominated	
London Film Critics' Circle	2002	Actor of the Year	The Man Who Wasn't There	Won	
Los Angeles Film Critics Association	1998	Best Supporting Actor	A Simple Plan	Tie^{[G]}	
National Society of Film Critics	1998	Best Supporting Actor	A Simple Plan	3rd Place	
Online Film & Television Association	1998	Best Supporting Actor	A Simple Plan	Won	
Online Film & Television Association	2001	Best Actor	The Man Who Wasn't There	Nominated	
Online Film & Television Association	2003	Best Ensemble	Love Actually	Nominated	
Online Film & Television Association	2014	Best Actor in a Motion Picture or Miniseries	Fargo	Nominated	
Online Film & Television Association	2014	Best Ensemble in a Motion Picture or Miniseries	Fargo	Nominated	
Online Film Critics Society	1998	Best Supporting Actor	A Simple Plan	Won	
Online Film Critics Society	2001	Best Actor	The Man Who Wasn't There	Won	
Phoenix Film Critics Society	2001	Best Actor in a Leading Role	The Man Who Wasn't There	Nominated	
Phoenix Film Critics Society	2001	Best Actor in a Supporting Role	Bandits	Nominated	
Russian Guild of Film Critics	2002	Best Foreign Actor	The Man Who Wasn't There	Won	
San Diego Film Critics Society	1998	Best Supporting Actor	A Simple Plan	Won	
Southeastern Film Critics Association	1998	Best Supporting Actor	A Simple Plan	Runner-up	
Southeastern Film Critics Association	2001	Best Actor	The Man Who Wasn't There	Won	
Washington D.C. Area Film Critics Association	2003	Best Ensemble	Love Actually	Won^{[I]}	

== See also ==
- Billy Bob Thornton filmography
- Billy Bob Thornton discography

== Notes ==
- A Tied with William H. Macy for his roles of George Parker/James Gordon/Arbogast in Pleasantville/A Civil Action/Psycho.
- B The other honorees included Richard Leacock, Spike Lee, and Ron Shelton.
- C Shared with Joel Coen and Ethan Coen.
- D Shared with Marc Juris and Jessica Falcon for episode "Film Preservation Classics with Billy Bob Thornton".
- E Shared with Tom Epperson.
- F Shared with producers David L. Bushell and Brandon Rosser.
- G Tied with Bill Murray for his roles of Herman Blume and Kenneth Bowden in Rushmore and Wild Things (also known as Sex Crimes).
- H Shared with Lucas Black, Natalie Canerday, Robert Duvall, James Hampton, John Ritter, J. T. Walsh, and Dwight Yoakam.
- I Shared with the cast.
