= I'll Be Home for Christmas (disambiguation) =

"I'll Be Home for Christmas" is a Christmas song.

I'll Be Home for Christmas may also refer to:

- I'll Be Home for Christmas, an alternate name for the Norman Rockwell painting Freedom from Want

== Film ==
- I'll Be Home for Christmas (1988 film), an American NBC Christmas drama film
- I'll Be Home for Christmas (1997 film), an American CBS Christmas comedy-drama film directed by Jerry London
- I'll Be Home for Christmas (1998 film), an American Christmas family comedy film
- I'll Be Home for Christmas (2016 film), a Hallmark Mystery original film directed by and starring James Brolin

== Literature ==
- I'll Be Home for Christmas, a 2010 novel by Fern Michaels
- I'll Be Home for Christmas, a 2013 novel by Jessica Scott
- I'll be Home for Christmas, a 2015 novel by Roisin Meaney
- I'll Be Home for Christmas, a 2019 novel by Abbey Clancy

== Music ==
- I'll Be Home for Christmas (Brian McKnight album), 2008
- I'll Be Home for Christmas (Isley Brothers album), 2007
- I'll Be Home for Christmas (EP), a 2009 extended play by Sara Evans
- I'll Be Home for Christmas, a 2009 album by Crystal Shawanda
- I'll Be Home for Christmas, single by Sitti.

== Television ==
- Toot & Puddle: I’ll Be Home for Christmas, a 2006 animated television special

=== Episodes ===
- "I'll Be Home for Christmas", Cagney & Lacey season 2, episode 9 (1982)
- "I'll Be Home for Christmas", Designing Women season 2, episode 12 (1987)
- "I'll Be Home for Christmas", ER season 8, episode 10 (2001)
- "I'll Be Home for Christmas", Evening Shade season 3, episode 12 (1992)
- "I'll Be Home for Christmas", Step by Step season 4, episode 12 (1994)
- "I'll Be Home for Christmas", Thirtysomething season 1, episode 9 (1987)
- "I'll Be Home for Christmas", Wansapanataym season 4, episode 2 (2012)

== See also ==
- Home for Christmas
- Home for the Holidays
- "I Won't Be Home for Christmas", a 2001 song by American rock band Blink-182.
- "I'll Be Home for Christmas...Maybe", Kevin Can Wait season 1, episode 12 (2016)
- "I'll Be Homeless for Christmas", Freddie episode 9 (2005)
- "I'll Be Homeless for Christmas", What's Happening Now!! season 2, episode 18 (1987)
