= List of fellows of University College, Oxford =

This is a list of current and former fellows of University College, Oxford, sorted by broad academic disciplines. It does not include Masters, even if they were fellows of the college before their appointment.

== Current ==
=== Humanities ===
- William Allan, classicist
- Karen O'Brien, English literature
- Maren Schentuleit, Egyptologist
- Tian Yuan Tan, professor of Chinese
- Oliver Zimmer, historian

=== Sciences ===
- Jon Blundy, petrologist and geologist
- John Frederick Dewey, structural geologist
- Tao Dong, immunologist
- Elaine Fox, psychologist
- Daniel Freeman, psychologist
- Sarah Harper, gerontologist
- Jotun Hein, professor of bioinformatics
- Gideon Henderson, geochemist
- Laura Herz, physicist
- David Logan, theoretical chemist
- Tamsin Maher, earth scientist
- Peter Norreys, physicist
- Barry V. L. Potter, professor of medicinal and biological chemistry
- Rosalind Rickaby, biogeochemist
- Bill Roscoe, computer scientist
- John Wheater, physicist

=== Social sciences ===
- Ruth Chang, professor of jurisprudence
- Ngaire Woods, professor of global economic governance and dean of the Blavatnik School of Government

== Emeritus and former ==
- John Finnis, legal philosopher
- Joel David Hamkins, mathematician
