= Beautiful Door =

Studio album by Billy Bob Thornton
- Released: July 24, 2007
- Recorded: 2007
- Studio: The Cave, Los Angeles
- Genre: Country
- Length: 46:28
- Label: New Door
- Producer: Billy Bob Thornton & Jim Mitchell

Billy Bob Thornton chronology
Hobo (2005)	Beautiful Door (2007)

Beautiful Door is a 2007 country music album by Billy Bob Thornton; released by New Door Records, it is the fourth (and most recent) solo album by the American actor and singer-songwriter.

== Reception ==
The album was described by the Chicago Tribune as "blend(ing) folks, roots rock and country."

A review noted that "Thornton takes his music far more seriously than Ethan Hawke takes his fiction. But his fourth record's anodyne vocals and adequate roots-rock band rarely rise above the cliché." while All Music stated "here he leaves the concepts, social and political ideas, and American mythologies behind for something more personal." AllMusic gave the album 4 stars; the German website CountryMusicNews 4 stars and a half, Cinemaonline.dk, 3, upon 5.

The Oklahoman found that the album was "a musically interesting mix of country, folk and roots rock, but the album comes across as maudlin and lacks variety. Thornton's limited vocal range adds to the sense of monotony." An Italian review praised the songwriting and Il Popolo del blues found the album was the best of the artist so far. Another positive Italian review found that it was an album that required patience and several listenings to unfold. "Thornton isn't nearly as interesting a musician as the characters he portrays on screen.", commented however the Illinois Entertainer. CBS News also stated that "One of the weaknesses of the album is Thornton's voice — he has limited vocal range and seems to be stuck on one note. But what he lacks in vocal depth, he makes up for with his songwriting abilities. Each track is like mini-story, which is not surprising considering Thornton is an Oscar-winning screenwriter. While the singing is simple, the well-written lyrics will inevitably draw the listener in."

== Tour ==
In 2007 Thornton formed a ad hoc group, The Boxmasters, to play the album material on tour.

== Track listing ==
All tracks are written by Brad Davis and Billy Bob Thornton.

No.	Title	Length
1.	"It's Just Me"	4:01
2.	"Restin' Your Soul"	3:36
3.	"In The Day"	4:12
4.	"Beautiful Door"	4:06
5.	"I Gotta Grow Up"	4:08
6.	"Hearts Like Mine"	3:57
7.	"Carnival Girl"	4:16
8.	"Always Countin'"	3:09
9.	"Pretty People"	3:21
10.	"I Can Tell You"	3:22
11.	"Hope For Glory"	4:50
12.	"The Boys Is Gone"	3:30
Total length:		46:28

== Personnel ==
=== Musicians ===
- Billy Bob Thornton – drums, producer, shaker, tambourine, lead vocals, backing vocals
- Brad Davis – audio engineer, producer, acoustic & electric guitars
- Teddy Andreadis – accordion, organ, piano
- J.D. Andrew – audio engineer, shaker
- Leland Sklar – bass
- Graham Nash – backing vocals

=== Production ===
- Adam Day – guitar technician
- Mike Fasano – drum technician
- Richie Gallo – A&R
- Joe Gastwirt – mastering
- Jim Mitchell – audio engineer, mixing, producer
- Meire Murakami – design
- Ryan Null – photo
- Lisa Roy – management
- Kristin Scott – production coordination
- Beth Stempel – production coordination
- Steve Winstead – guitar technician
