= The Boxmasters =

American rock band

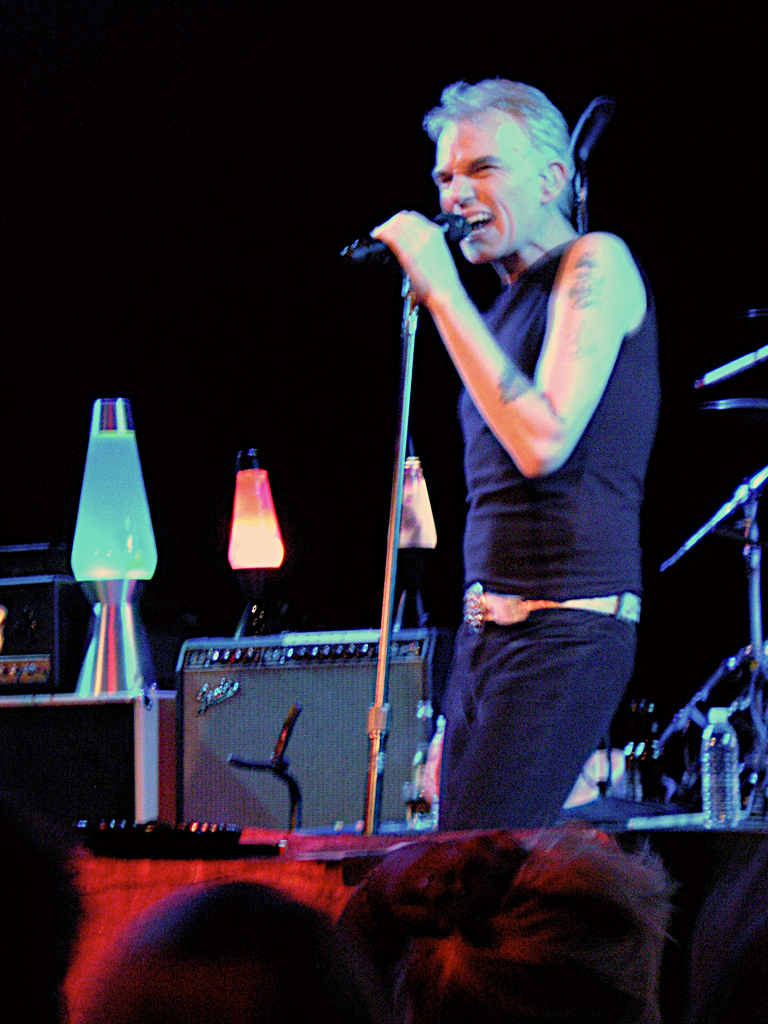
- The band performing at Slims in San Francisco, California, in September 2007

Background information
- Origin: Bellflower, California, United States
- Genres: Blues rock; country; country rock; psychobilly; rockabilly; roots rock
- Years active: 2007–2010, 2015–present
- Labels: Vanguard; NDR Records; Thirty Tigers
- Members: Billy Bob Thornton; J.D. Andrew; Kirk McKim; Raymond Hardy; Nick Davidson
- Past members: Micheal Wayne Butler; Brad Davis; Daniel Baker; Teddy Andreadis; Dave Fowler; Eric Rhoades; Marty Rifkin; Mike "Bubba" Bruce; Chuck Garric
- Website: theboxmasters.com

The Boxmasters is an American rock band founded in Bellflower, California, in 2007 by actor Billy Bob Thornton and Grammy Award-winning recording engineer J.D. Andrew. The group released their 19th album Pepper Tree Hill on July 11, 2025.

Before he formed the Boxmasters, frontman Thornton had played in bands since middle school, worked as a roadie, recorded in 1974 in Muscle Shoals, Alabama and in the 2000s released four solo albums. After listening to "Yesterday's Gone" by Chad & Jeremy and thinking about covering it in a hillbilly music style, he had the idea of making Americanized version of British Invasion pop songs. From mid-2008 to late 2008, the group embarked on a tour across the United States, ending in Los Angeles. They also played in the 2009 South by Southwest festival. After opening several tours for Willie Nelson in 2009 and 2010, The Boxmasters ceased touring for five years, which they used to write multiple albums and emerged with a more natural sound, as opposed to their early hillbilly leanings.

== History ==
=== Beginnings ===
Billy Bob Thornton—credited on the band's material as W. R. Thornton—has said that "[he] never intended to become a movie star, it happened accidentally. [...] Music is what I love." Before his acting career started, he played in cover bands of Creedence Clearwater Revival, ZZ Top, and also worked as a roadie with Nitty Gritty Dirt Band, Johnny Paycheck, Blood, Sweat & Tears, the Statler Brothers, and other bands during high school. He also released a record with a band called 'Hot Lanta' in 1974. During his acting career, Thornton released four solo albums from 2001 to 2007.

Thornton brought in sound engineer J. D. Andrew to help with his 2007 album Beautiful Door. After jamming together, they started to record some of their material. Andrew had known Mike Butler "for six or seven years" and called on him to play guitar for them. According to Andrew, after the trio played together, they said "Shoot, this sounds like a band." The three came up with the name "Boxmasters" after a piece of Southern slang, which they later described by saying "remember the bad boy in high school who got all the girls and left a trail of broken hearts ... and more?" Thornton had also briefly played in country star Porter Wagoner's similarly titled band 'The Wagonmasters', which he later said had brought chills down his spine.

=== Early career ===
The band started in Bellflower, California, in 2007. Their first album, The Boxmasters, was released on June 10, 2008, by Vanguard Records. The Washington Post praised the album, and the paper remarked that listeners will get their money's worth if they enjoy the music even half as much as the band did during the recordings.

The group resumed touring in July 2008, adding musicians Brad Davis on mandolin, guitar, and vocals, Teddy Andreadis on harmonica and organ, and James Michael "Bubba" Bruce on drums. Their tour across the United States ended on September 7, 2008, when they played at the House of Blues in Los Angeles. The band released their second album, Christmas Cheer, on November 11, 2008, also through Vanguard Records. Allmusic gave another critical review, calling the music "an acquired taste". USA Today music critic Brian Mansfield named it one of his favorite holiday albums. The Boxmasters went on a post-album 12-city tour with Willie Nelson, playing from November 22 in Enid, Oklahoma, to December 6 in Champaign, Illinois. They then embarked on a six-city tour of Texas in March 2009, which included a March 18 appearance at the South by Southwest music conference.

The band released Modbilly on Vanguard on April 21, 2009. Houston Press praised the album, saying that it "confirms that Billy Bob Thornton's writing talents aren't confined to his Oscar-winning screenplays." Allmusic stated that it "goes on far too long, never changing, never peaking". Prefix gave a mostly positive review, calling it "for real" and stating that "Thornton’s distinct voice continues to be a nice fit with the material". Entertainment Weekly criticized it as "unmemorable".

The group has covered The Beatles, The Who, The Rolling Stones, The Turtles, and Mott the Hoople in its unique style. It also plays original songs, mostly written or co-written by Thornton based on the "white trash" figures he had seen in his Arkansas childhood. The Montreal Gazette has called his original material "at turns dark and funny, with world-class hooks". The members play while wearing well-dressed 'Mod' outfits such as tailored black suits, white shirts, and narrow black neckties.

Aside from playing, Thornton has said that he plans on creating comic books based on him and other band members. Plots would involve the band coming to the aid of townspeople as they tour. He said, "We're not sure what our superpowers are going to be yet".

=== Canadian touring and controversy ===
In April 2009, the band was scheduled to tour across Canada, opening for country music veterans Willie Nelson and Ray Price. On April 8, the band appeared on the national CBC Radio One program Q, hosted by Jian Ghomeshi. During the first half of the interview, Thornton was "surly and uncooperative", and responded with "I don't know" when asked how long the band had been together. When asked about his musical tastes and influences as a child, he gave his longest answer, but it was about his favorite magazine Famous Monsters of Filmland. He also stated that he had "instructed" the show's producers to not ask any questions about his career as a screenwriter and actor. The interview is satirized in the Detective Crashmore sketch in Season 2, Episode 3 of I Think You Should Leave.

Ghomeshi, in introducing the band, mentioned the acting credentials of Thornton, but never based his questions to Thornton about his show business career. Thornton went on to say that Canadian audiences were generally reserved and that the band was used to playing in places where people move around and throw things at each other. He then added, "it's like mashed potatoes with no gravy." This caused an outpouring of criticism from across Canada and around the world for the star's behavior.

The following night, the band opened for Willie Nelson at Toronto's prestigious Massey Hall. A series of boos and catcalls erupted mid-set, with people in the audience yelling "here comes the gravy!" when Thornton tried to explain he liked Canadians but not the CBC radio host. Before the show, when asked about his "gravy" comment, Thornton claimed he was talking about the radio host. Local reviews of Thornton's Toronto performance were not positive. Toronto Star called Thornton's voice a "high, tinny whine" and The Globe and Mail commented that "Nelson could teach Billy Bob Thornton more than a few things". On April 10, The Boxmasters dropped out of the tour early, announcing that they would not be playing with Nelson during subsequent concerts scheduled in London, Ontario, and Montreal. Thornton said that band members had come down with the flu. Willie Nelson's publicist had no comment.

The band resumed touring in Stamford, Connecticut, on April 14. In the aftermath of the controversy, Thornton appeared on Jimmy Kimmel Live! and he said, "The fact that was news was astounding to me... But it gave humpbacked geeks all over the world something to do for a couple of days." He added that he only wants to be perceived as a musician in the context of the band, remarking that "I'm just in their band, I'm just one of those guys".

=== Touring hiatus ===
In 2010, The Boxmasters ceased touring for almost five years. During that time Billy Bob Thornton wrote & directed the feature film Jayne Mansfield's Car.

=== Return to album releases and touring ===
In 2015 the Boxmasters returned with the album Somewhere Down The Road released by 101 Ranch Records. Rolling Stone said "This sprawling double album, which amazingly doesn't feel Use Your Illusion bloated, finds him and the ace 'Masters — who play the Grand Ole Opry on August 18th — mixing country noir with bright jangle pop. One disc is all Americana gothic, while the other is Nuggets by way of Liverpool. "Always Lie," from the twangy half of the project, is Thornton devilishly sharing his trick for dealing with the press and ranks with some of country's most honest songwriting. (Or does it?)"

=== Post Pandemic Activity ===
The Boxmasters "2025 Pepper Tree Hill Tour" started August 15, 2025 in Clearwater, Florida. "The Boxmasters, fronted by Billy Bob Thornton, didn't just play Clearwater's Capitol Theatre last Friday night – they detonated it! From the first chord, the sold-out crowd was electrified. The house vibrated with an energy that could only be described as a full-blown rock and roll revival."

The Boxmasters also joined The Who in 2025 for two stops on "The Song Is Over" Tour. Sunrise, Florida and Newark, New Jersey are the first 2 stops on the legendary band's final tour.

=== Collaborations ===
In 2023 and 2024, Ian Hunter of Mott The Hoople released two albums, Defiance Part 1 and Defiance Part 2. On Part 1, Billy Bob added tracks on the song "Kiss 'N Make Up" and on part 2, both Billy Bob and J.D. Andrew joined on the track "Hope."

2024 also found the release of Gov't Mule's "Peace Like A River" album which features Billy Bob Thornton and others on the song "The River Only Flows One Way."

In 2023 The Boxmasters collaborated with Tausha Hanna for the 2023 release of the single "As I Ever Was" on Future Youth Records. The song, which dropped on October 10 in recognition of World Mental Health Day, confides Tausha’s own personal struggle with anxiety and depression and appealed to Thornton because those are issues he shares.

== Members ==
Current members

- J. D. Andrew – guitar, vocals
- Kirk McKim – guitar
- Raymond Hardy – bass
- Nick Davidson – drums
- Billy Bob Thornton (credited as "W.R. Thornton") – drums, vocals, acting

Former members

- Micheal Wayne Butler – guitar, lap steel
- Brad Davis – guitar, vocals
- Daniel Baker – guitar, vocals
- Eric Rhoades – drums
- Dave Fowler – bass
- Teddy Andreadis – organ, piano

== Discography ==
- The Boxmasters (Vanguard, 2008)
- Christmas Cheer (Vanguard, 2008)
- Modbilly (Vanguard, 2009)
- Somewhere Down the Road (101 Ranch Records, 2015)
- Providence (self-released, exclusively available via theboxmasters.com, 2015)
- Boys and Girls... And the World (NDR Records, 2016)
- Tea Surfing (NDR Records, 2016)
- In Stereo! (NDR Records, 2018)
- Speck (KeenTone Records, 2019)
- Light Rays (KeenTone Records, 2020)
- Christmas in California (KeenTone Records, 2021)
- Help...I'm Alive (KeenTone Records, Apr 15, 2022)
- Boxmasters '66 (KeenTone Records, Dec 24, 2022)
- Providence (Remix 2023) (KeenTone Records, Apr 20, 2023)
- '69 (KeenTone Records, May 5, 2023)
- Stranded in a Stain Vol. 1 + 2 (KeenTone Records, Dec 25, 2023)
- Love & Hate in Desperate Places (KeenTone Records, Aug 30, 2024)
- I'm Not Like Everybody Else (The Kinks cover, played as the encore song on the "2024 Love & Hate Tour", exclusively available via theboxmasters.com)
- Missing a Heart (KeenTone Records, Feb 14, 2025)
- Pepper Tree Hill (KeenTone Records, July 11, 2025)
