= My Run =

- Directed by: Tim VandeSteeg
- Written by: Kim Pederson
- Produced by: Tim VandeSteeg; Mark Castaldo
- Starring: Terry Hitchcock; Teri Sue Hitchcock; Chris Hitchcock; Jason Hitchcock
- Narrated by: Billy Bob Thornton
- Cinematography: Matt Ehling
- Edited by: David Frank
- Music by: Steve Horner
- Release dates: October 23, 2009 (Austin); March 31, 2011 (United States)
- Running time: 85 minutes
- Country: United States
- Language: English

My Run is a 2009 documentary film directed and produced by Tim VandeSteeg and produced by Mark Castaldo. The film chronicles Terry Hitchcock's journey of completing 75 marathons in 75 consecutive days to raise awareness for single parent families. It first screened at the Austin Film Festival on October 23, 2009.

== Plot ==
My Run tells the true story of two journeys. The first, which began in 1984, opens the film when Terry Hitchcock's wife Sue dies of breast cancer. Only a few days later he loses his job. Suddenly, he finds himself alone with his three young children and no income.

The film follows Terry as he learns to function as a single parent, and discovers how difficult it is to maintain and nourish a strong loving family and how faith can be instrumental in strengthening your will to keep moving forward. His experience also teaches him that single parents and their children are unsung everyday heroes.

The film jumps forward to 1996, when Terry takes the first step of his "Mega-Marathon" from Minneapolis to Atlanta. He runs every day, covering the equivalent of a marathon or more for 75 consecutive days to arrive just in time for the summer Olympic Games. He runs in honor of his wife and to bring attention and a voice to the everyday heroes; the single parents and their kids.

Terry expresses in the film that he wants to let everyone know that nothing is impossible, that ordinary people can do extraordinary things and by doing so inspire others. "Every one of us can do something", Terry says, "that's what it’s all about".

== Production ==
Director/Producer Tim VandeSteeg was inspired to make this film after meeting Terry Hitchcock through a mutual contact.

Billy Bob Thornton's narration was recorded in the same studio where his group The Boxmasters records.

== Critical reception ==
Josh Board, from Sandiego.com says "Run, don't walk, to catch this in the theatres when its released."

=== Accolades ===
Award	Date of ceremony	Category	Recipient(s)	Result
Austin Film Festival	November 5, 2009	Documentary Feature Competition Audience Award		Won
Newport Beach Film Festival	April 30, 2010	Outstanding Achievement in Documentary		Won
Mammoth Film Festival	December 17, 2009	Best Documentary		Won
Las Vegas Film Festival		Grand Jury Prize		Won
DocMiami International Film Festival		Audience Award		Won
Visionfest		Outstanding Achievement Documentary Filmmaking		Won
Big Bear Lake International Film Festival		Audience Award		Won
