= Louise Edwards =

Louise Edwards may refer to:

- Louise Edwards (astronomer), Canadian astronomer
- Louise Edwards (historian), Australian sinologist

== See also ==
- Louisa Edwards, American romance author
- Louis Edwards (disambiguation)
