= Lisa Roy =

Lisa Roy may refer to:

- Lisa Roy (rower)
- Lisa Roy (publicist)
- Lisa Roy, Manitoba Liberal Party candidate in the 1999 Manitoba provincial election
