= Nashville Rises =

- Produced by: Zac Adams; Camron Carrier; Mark Slaughter
- Narrated by: Billy Bob Thornton
- Cinematography: Bill Cornelius
- Edited by: Luke Dye
- Music by: Cody Westheimer
- Release date: April 14, 2011
- Running time: 30 minutes
- Country: United States

Nashville Rises is the first documentary film about the city of Nashville, Tennessee's response to the 2010 Tennessee floods. It premiered at the 42nd Nashville Film Festival on April 14, 2011 and received the festival's "Ground Zero Tennessee Spirit Award for Best Short Documentary Film". The film was narrated by Billy Bob Thornton and directed by Zac Adams.

== Production ==
Zac Adams, a graduate of Franklin High School and Watkins College of Art, Design & Film, first conceived of Nashville Rises after his company Skydive Films produced public service announcements for the American Red Cross and the Community Foundation of Middle Tennessee in the wake of the 2010 Tennessee floods. Citing the wider world's ignorance and negligence of the event, Adams wanted to spread the message of the floods, their repercussions, and Tennesseans' response to a wider audience.

Mirroring the volunteerism the film witnessed, the project itself was a non-profit venture; time, labor, equipment, media, expertise, and talent were freely donated to the project. Adams produced the film alongside filmmaker Camron Carrier, as well as American musician and Franklin resident Mark Slaughter. Cinematographer Bill Cornelius, film editor Luke Dye, and composer Cody Westheimer all donated their time to the production of Nashville Rises as well.

== Release ==
In January 2011, Nashville Rises was slotted to appear at Gatlinburg Screenfest (March 25–27, 2011), the 42nd Nashville Film Festival (April 22), as well as further showings at film festivals in New York City, Los Angeles, Chicago, San Francisco, and London. In May 2011, the film was screened at the Belcourt Theater in Hillsboro, Tennessee for the anniversary of the floods; Slaughter (vis-à-vis Mark Slaughter's involvement) joined singer-songwriter and Nashville Rises interviewee Julie Roberts and more in performing at the charity event.

Nashville Rises was scheduled to air on PBS late Summer 2011.

=== Finances ===
All proceeds from Nashville Rises will go to benefit Hands on Nashville, the Community Foundation of Middle Tennessee, and the American Red Cross.
