= Ruth Ryan Langan =

American writer

- Born: December 12, 1937 (age 88); Detroit, Michigan, U.S.
- Occupation: Writer
- Children: 5
- Writing career
- Pen name: Ruth Langan
- Genre: Romance
- Website: www.ryanlangan.com

Ruth Ryan Langan (born December 12, 1937 in Detroit) is an American writer of romance novels. She is a New York Times Bestselling author of over one hundred novels, both historical and contemporary under the penname Ruth Langan. She also writes contemporary Western romantic suspense for Grand Central Publishing, as well as some novellas for Jove under the pseudonym R. C. Ryan.

== Biography ==
Ruth Ryan Langan began her writing career in secret. Her family discovered her writings when her children came home unexpectedly from school one day and found her writing. When Langan's husband was told of her hobby, he bought her an electric typewriter "because 'writers need tools'". Her first book was published by Silhouette Books in 1981 after an editor picked it out of their slush pile. After the first sale was completed, Langan got an agent.

Langan is a charter member of the Romance Writers of America, and a member of DWW (Detroit Working Writers). She has five children and lives in Michigan.

== Bibliography ==
=== As Ruth Langan ===
==== Texas ====
1. Texas Heart (1989)
2. Texas Healer (1992)
3. Texas Hero (1993)

==== Highlander Series ====
1. One Christmas Night (1999) also in omnibus One Christmas Night
2. Highland Barbarian (1990) also in omnibus Ransomed Brides
3. Highland Heather (1991)
4. Highland Fire (1991)
5. Highland Heart (1992)
6. The Highlander (1994)
7. Highland Heaven (1995)

==== The Jewels of Texas ====
1. Diamond (1996)
2. Pearl (1996)
3. Jade (1997)
4. Ruby (1997)
5. Malachite (1998)

==== O'Neil Saga ====
1. Rory (2002)
2. Conor (1999)
3. Briana (1999)

==== Wildes of Wyoming ====
1. Chance (2000)
2. Hazard (2000)
3. Ace (2000)

==== Sirens of the Sea ====
1. The Sea Witch (2000)
2. The Sea Nymph (2001)
3. The Sea Sprite (2001)

==== Lassiter Law ====
1. By Honor Bound (2001)
2. Return of the Prodigal Son (2002)
3. Banning's Woman (2002)
4. His Father's Son (2002)

==== Sullivan Sisters ====
1. Awakening Alex (2001)
2. Loving Lizbeth (2001)
3. Seducing Celeste (2001)

==== Badlands ====
1. Badlands Law (2002)
2. Badlands Legend (2002)
3. Badlands Heart (2002)

==== Mystical Highlands ====
1. Highland Sword (2003)
2. The Betrayal (2003)
3. The Knight and the Seer (2003)

==== Devil’s Cove ====
1. Cover-Up (2004) also in Cover-Up / Shadows of the Past
2. Wanted (2004)
3. Vendetta (2004)
4. Retribution (2004)

==== Stand Alone Novels ====
- Just Like Yesterday (1981)
- Hidden Isle (1983)
- Beloved Gambler (1984)
- No Gentle Love (1984)
- Eden of Temptation (1984)
- Nevada Nights (1985)
- This Time Forever (1985)
- Star-crossed (1985)
- Family Secrets (1985)
- To Love a Dreamer (1985)
- September's Dream (1985)
- Mysteries of the Heart (1986)
- Whims of Fate (1986)
- The Proper Miss Porter (1987)
- Destiny's Daughter (1987)
- Mistress of the Seas (1988)
- Passage West (1988)
- The Heart's Secrets (1989)
- Captive of Desire (1990)
- Christmas Miracle (1992)
- Addy Starr (1992)
- Deception (1993)
- All That Glitters (1994)
- Christmas Miracle (1994)
- Dulcie's Gift (1996)
- The Courtship of Izzy McCree (1998)
- Blackthorne (1998)
- Paradise Falls (2004)
- Ashes of Dreams (2005)
- Duchess of Fifth Avenue (2006)
- Heart's Delight (2007)
- Angel (2014)
- Cross His Heart (2015)
- Passion's Law (2001) #7 in The Coltons Series
- Snowbound Cinderella (1999) #6 in the Fortunes of Texas Series
- Maverick Hearts (1996) also in omnibus Outlaw Brides

=== As R. C. Ryan ===
==== McCords ====
1. Montana Legacy (2010)
2. Montana Destiny (2010)
3. Montana Glory (2010)

==== Wyoming Sky ====
1. Quinn (2012)
2. Josh (2012)
3. Jake (2013)

==== Copper Creek Cowboys ====
1. The Maverick of Copper Creek (2014)
2. The Rebel of Copper Creek (2015)
3. The Legacy of Copper Creek (2015)

==== Home for Christmas ====
1. Home for Christmas (2015)
2. Christmas at Bitter Creek (2015) also in omnibus Historical Christmas Stories 1990 and Safe Haven for Christmas

==== Malloys of Montana ====
1. Matt (2016)
2. Luke (2016)
3. A Cowboy's Christmas Eve (2016)
4. Reed (2017)

==== Montana Strong ====
1. Cowboy on my Mind (2018)
2. Cowboy Next Door (2019)
3. A Cowboy To Love (2019)

=== Anthologies and collections ===
Anthology or Collection	Contents	Publication Date	Coauthor
Historical Christmas Stories 1990	Christmas at Bitter Creek	1990	Patricia Potter Nora Roberts
Outlaw Brides	Maverick Hearts	1996	Elaine Coffman Mary McBride
Holiday Inn	Rachel's Hero	1996	Debra Dier Linda Jones Linda Madl
Ransomed Brides	Highland Barbarian	1998	Patricia Potter
Once Upon A Castle	Falcon's Lair	1998	Jill Gregory Nora Roberts Marianne Willman
Once Upon A Star	The Curse of Castle Clough	1999	Jill Gregory Nora Roberts Marianne Willman
One Christmas Night	One Christmas Night	1999	Jacqueline Navin Lyn Stone
Once Upon A Dream	The Enchantment	2000	Jill Gregory Nora Roberts Marianne Willman
Once Upon A Rose	The Roses of Glenross	2001	Jill Gregory Nora Roberts Marianne Willman
Wild West Brides: Flanna and the Lawman/ This Side of Heaven/Second Chance Bride	This Side of Heaven	2002	Carolyn Davidson Cathy Maxwell
Once Upon a Kiss	Sealed With a Kiss	2002	Jill Gregory Nora Roberts Marianne Willman
Safe Haven for Christmas	Christmas at Bitter Creek	2002	Paula Marshall Deborah Simmons
Once Upon a Midnight	Dream Lover	2003	Jill Gregory Nora Roberts Marianne Willman
The Coltons: Brides of Privilege	Colton's Bride	2004	Kasey Michaels Carolyn Zane
Cover-Up / Shadows of the Past	Cover-Up	2004	Frances Housden
Her Passionate Protector / Wanted	Wanted	2004	Laurey Bright
Moon Shadows	Blood on the Moon	2004	Jill Gregory Nora Roberts Marianne Willman
Retribution / Makeover Mission	Retribution	2004	Mary Buckham
Bump in the Night	The Passenger	2006	Mary Blayney Mary Kay McComas J.D. Robb
Dead of Night	Timeless	2007	Mary Blayney Mary Kay McComas J.D. Robb
Suite 606	Cold Case	2008	Mary Blayney J.D. Robb
The Lost	Legacy	2009	Mary Blayney Patricia Gaffney J.D. Robb
The Other Side	Almost Heaven	2010	Mary Blayney Mary Kay McComas Patricia Gaffney J.D. Robb
The Unquiet	The Unforgiven	2011	Mary Blayney Patricia Gaffney Mary Kay McComas J.D. Robb
Mirror Mirror	Stroke of Midnight	2013	Mary Blayney Elaine Fox Mary Kay McComas J.D. Robb
Down the Rabbit Hole	Fallen	2015	Mary Blayney Elaine Fox Mary Kay McComas J.D. Robb
