= Hobo (Billy Bob Thornton album) =

Studio album by Billy Bob Thornton
- Released: September 13, 2005
- Recorded: 2005
- Genre: Country rock
- Label: Big Deal
- Producer: Billy Bob Thornton, Matt Laug, Randy Mitchell

Billy Bob Thornton chronology
The Edge of the World (2003)	Hobo (2005)	Beautiful Door (2007)

Professional ratings
Review scores
Source	Rating
AllMusic	3.5/5 stars

Hobo is the third album by American actor and singer-songwriter Billy Bob Thornton. It was released by Big Deal Records in 2005.

The song "Your Blue Shadow" was originally featured on his album Private Radio.

== Track listing ==
1. "Hobo"
2. "I Used to Be a Lion"
3. "The Late Great Golden State"
4. "El Centro on Five Dollars a Day"
5. "Purple Passion"
6. "Your Blue Shadow"
7. "Orange County Suicide"
8. "Smooth Me Over"
9. "At Least We Dreamed"
10. "Gray Walls"

== Trivia ==
During the filming of his movie The Astronaut Farmer in Santa Fe, New Mexico, Thornton held a "One stop publicity tour" (his words) for the movie and the album.
