= Suffix (disambiguation) =

A suffix is part of a word; an affix that follows the morphemes to which it can attach.

- Possessive suffix, a suffix used in word formation for creation of various possessive forms

Suffix may also refer to:

- Suffix (name), the style at the end of a person's name which gives additional identifying information about the person
- Suffix (computer science), the last part of a string of characters
- Suffix notation, a notation for manipulating vector quantities, also known as index notation
- Suffix array, an array of integers giving the starting positions of suffixes of a string in lexicographical order
- Suffix tree, a data structure that presents the suffixes of a given string in a way that allows for a particularly fast implementation of many important string operations

== See also ==
- Prefix (disambiguation)
