= Evening Shade =

American sitcom (1990–1994)

- Genre: Sitcom
- Created by: Linda Bloodworth-Thomason
- Starring: Burt Reynolds; Marilu Henner; Michael Jeter; Jay R. Ferguson; Hal Holbrook; Ossie Davis; Charles Durning; Elizabeth Ashley; Ann Wedgeworth; Linda Gehringer; Charlie Dell; Candace Hutson; Jacob Parker
- Narrated by: Ossie Davis
- Opening theme: Instrumental theme by Sonny Curtis (1990–92); Theme with lyrics by Bobby Goldsboro (1992–94)
- Country of origin: United States
- Original language: English
- No. of seasons: 4
- No. of episodes: 101 (list of episodes)

Production
- Executive producers: Linda Bloodworth-Thomason; Harry Thomason; Burt Reynolds
- Running time: 30 minutes (with commercials)
- Production companies: Bloodworth/Thomason Mozark Productions; Burt Reynolds Productions; MTM Enterprises; CBS Productions

Original release
- Network: CBS
- Release: September 21, 1990 – May 23, 1994

Evening Shade is an American sitcom that aired on CBS from September 21, 1990, to May 23, 1994. The series stars Burt Reynolds as Woodrow "Wood" Newton, an ex-professional football player for the Pittsburgh Steelers, who returns to rural Evening Shade, Arkansas, to coach a high-school football team with a long losing streak. Reynolds personally requested to use the Steelers as his character's former team because he was a fan.

The general theme of the show is the appeal of small-town life. Episodes often ended with a closing narration by Ossie Davis, as his character Ponder Blue, summing up the events of the episode, always closing with "... in a place called Evening Shade." The opening segment included clips from around Arkansas, including the famous McClard's Bar-B-Q in Hot Springs National Park.

== Summary ==
A former pro football player for the Pittsburgh Steelers who quit after an injury, Wood Newton has settled down to a quiet life in Arkansas as the coach of the Evening Shade High School football team, known for its long losing streak.

Wood and his wife Ava, whom he married when she was only 18 (a grievance frequently voiced by her father Evan Evans, owner of the local newspaper) are devoted to each other despite their age difference. Ava is an ambitious, successful practicing lawyer who in the first season is elected District Attorney while pregnant with their fourth (unintended) child Emily, who is born in the first-season finale. Among Wood and Ava's closest friends are the somewhat-older town doctor Harlan Eldridge and his trusting wife Merleen, who always believes the best of people.

The show's plots focus on the various difficulties that Wood faces in living a very different life than he ever expected, as well as the obvious family pressures of two jobs and four children. Additional tensions come from Ava's aunt Freida, Evan's perennially discontented sister, who especially disapproves when Evan begins dating town stripper Fontana Beausoleil, who discovers in season two that she is Merleen's long-lost daughter, whom she gave up for adoption at age 15. Evan and Fontana get married in a three-part episode in season two and have a child in season three.

The show also gets mileage out of the incongruity of the decidedly unathletic but well-meaning assistant coach Herman Stiles, the best the school's budget can afford. During the first season, he catches the eye of Evening Shade High's prim and proper principal, Margaret Fouch, and they start dating.

On July 12 and 19, 1993, CBS aired two parts of an hour-long pilot, Harlan & Merleen, as a proposed spin-off of the series. The pilot had the Elldridges open their home to young pregnant women who needed help (one of whom was played by Leah Remini). The pilot did not achieve series status.

== Characters ==
=== Main ===
Promotional cast photo

- Woodrow "Wood" Newton (Burt Reynolds)
- Ava Evans Newton (Marilu Henner)
- Evan Evans (Hal Holbrook)
- Ponder Blue (Ossie Davis)
- Dr. Harlan Eldridge (Charles Durning)
- Herman Stiles (Michael Jeter)
- Taylor Newton (Jay R. Ferguson)
- Molly Newton (Melissa Renée Martin, season 1), (Candace Hutson, seasons 2-4)
- Will Newton (Jacob Parker)
- Nub Oliver (Charlie Dell)
- Frieda Evans (Elizabeth Ashley)
- Merleen Eldridge (Ann Wedgeworth)
- Fontana Beausoleil (Linda Gehringer)
- Margaret Fouch (Ann Hearn)

=== Recurring ===
- Dorothy (Jane Abbott)
- Virgil (Burton Gilliam)
- Andrew Phillpot (David A. R. White), Taylor's best friend
- Neal "Thor" Heck (Pepper Sweeney, 1991–93)
- Aimee Thompson (Hilary Swank, 1991–92), (Ari Meyers, 1992–93), Taylor's girlfriend
- Irma Wallingsford (Alice Ghostley, 1992–94)
- Daisy (Leah Remini, 1993), a New York transplant who becomes Taylor's girlfriend after his break-up with Aimee
- Wanda (Wanda Jones, 1993–94), waitress at Blue's Bar-B-Que Villa
- Emily Newton (Alexa PenaVega, 1993–94), Ava and Wood's youngest child, who appears as a 5-year-old in the final season

== Episode list ==
Season	Episodes	Originally released	
Season	Episodes	First released	Last released
1	25	September 21, 1990	May 6, 1991
2	25	September 16, 1991	May 18, 1992
3	25	September 21, 1992	May 17, 1993
4	26	September 20, 1993	May 23, 1994

== Production ==
The show's production company, Mozark Productions, was a joint venture by creator Linda Bloodworth-Thomason of Missouri and her husband, Arkansas native Harry Thomason, which concurrently produced another successful show set in the South, Designing Women. Hal Holbrook's Designing Women character was killed off to free the actor to star in the newer program. The series was produced in association with CBS Productions, Burt Reynolds Productions, and MTM Enterprises. CBS retained full ownership of the series while MTM syndicated the series in the United States.

== Release ==
=== Home media ===
On July 15, 2008, CBS DVD/Paramount Home Entertainment released the first season on DVD, albeit with redone music and editing.

On April 12, 2019, Visual Entertainment released the complete series on DVD in Region 1 for the first time.

== Reception ==
The series enjoyed strong ratings during its entire run, hitting its peak in season two with a number 15 Nielsen ranking. At the time, this was a notably higher position than The Cosby Show, which had recently fallen from a five-year streak as TV's number-one program. Evening Shade was still a top-30 performer, after CBS cancelled the series in May 1994. Skyrocketing production costs, mainly attributed to the large salaries of the show's top-caliber, all-star cast, were the primary reason given for the cancellation (which was confirmed by Marilu Henner in her September 1994 appearance on Charlie Rose). However, some have speculated that the show's ending was a decision made by Reynolds, rather than CBS, as his recent marriage troubles with Loni Anderson (from whom he was divorced in 1993) were thought to have affected his work.

After its cancellation, reruns of Evening Shade were picked up by The Family Channel, which were also edited considerably from their original broadcast versions.

=== Nielsen ratings ===
Season	Timeslot	Rank	Rating	Households
1) 1990-91	Fridays at 8:00 pm (episodes 1-4, 6-7); Mondays at 8:00 pm (episodes 5, 8-24)	#49	12.1	N/A
2) 1991-92	Mondays at 8:00 pm	#15	15.6	14,367,600
3) 1992-93	Mondays at 8:00 pm	#19	14.5	13,499,500
4) 1993-94	Mondays at 8:00 pm	#27	13.2	12,434,400
