= The Edge of the World (Billy Bob Thornton album) =

Studio album by Billy Bob Thornton
- Released: August 19, 2003
- Recorded: 2003
- Genre: Country rock
- Label: Sanctuary
- Producer: Billy Bob Thornton, Jim Mitchell

Billy Bob Thornton chronology
Private Radio (2001)	''The Edge of the World'' (2003)	Hobo (2005)

The Edge of the World is the second album by American actor and singer-songwriter Billy Bob Thornton. It was released in 2003 on Sanctuary Records.

Professional ratings
Review scores
Source	Rating
Allmusic	4/5 stars
Entertainment.ie	link

== Track listing ==
All tracks composed by Billy Bob Thornton; except where indicated

1. "Emily" (Jimmy Don Thornton)
2. "Everybody Lies" (Billy Bob Thornton, Michael R. Shipp)
3. "Island Avenue" (Jimmy Don Thornton)
4. "The Desperate One" (Billy Bob Thornton, Brad Davis, Jim Mitchell)
5. "Everybody's Talking" (Fred Neil)
6. "Fast Hearts" (Billy Bob Thornton, Randy Mitchell)
7. "Baby Can I Hold You" (Tracy Chapman)
8. "The Edge of the World"
9. "God"
10. "Pieces of a Man" (Billy Bob Thornton, Randy Mitchell)
11. "Pieces of a Man (Part II)" (Billy Bob Thornton, Randy Mitchell)
12. "The Edge of the World (Reprise)"
13. "Do God Wop"
14. "Savior" (Billy Bob Thornton, Randy Mitchell)
15. "Midnight Train" (Billy Bob Thornton, Randy Mitchell)
16. "To The End of Time" (Billy Bob Thornton, Marty Stuart)
17. "The Edge of the World (Part II)"

== Reception ==
"Thornton proves himself at home across a range of rock, blues and country idioms.", commented The Guardian.
