= Tao Dong =

Chinese-British immunologist

- Education: Fudan University, Shanghai, China Oxford University, United Kingdom
- Scientific career
- Fields: Immunology
- Website: https://www.ndm.ox.ac.uk/principal-investigators/researcher/tao-dong

Tao Dong is a Chinese-British immunologist who is Professor of Immunology at Oxford University. Her work focuses on the study of T-cells which respond to viral infections and viral associated cancer. She is a founding director for both the CAMS-Oxford joint International Center for Transnational Immunology and the Chinese Academy of Medical Sciences Oxford Institute (COI).

== Career ==
Dong received her BSc degree in Physiology from Fudan University, Shanghai, China in 1987. After graduating, she worked as a research assistant and subsequently a research associate at the Academy of Science (CAS) in Xinjian, China. In 1993, she moved to Oxford where she worked as a research assistant in the Weatherall Institute of Molecular Medicine, working for Sarah Rowland-Jones and Andrew McMichael.

She continued her work for them as a doctoral candidate and in 1998 gained her DPhil in Immunology from Trinity College at Oxford University and the Nuffield Department of Medicine. Her work focused on the T-cells associated with HIV disease progression. Continuing as a postdoctoral researcher at Oxford, her research expanded to include the study of the Influenza virus. In 2010, she started her own research group, the Human T cell responses against Viruses & Cancer group. She has held the post of Professor of Immunology at Oxford University since 2014 and is a Supernumerary Fellow in Medicine at University College.

Dong is a member of the MRC Infection and Immunity board, and a program leader for the MRC Human Immunology Unit. Her collaborative work with several institutes in China on the Influenza, HIV, and Hepatitis B and C virus led to the founding of the first Chinese overseas Medical Science Institute based in Oxford (Chinese Academy of Medical Sciences Oxford Institute) and the CAMS-Oxford joint International Center for Transnational Immunology.

With the outbreak of the COVID-19 virus, Dong's work has included studying the immune response to SARS-Cov-2 infection in patients with COVID-19. She was integral in coordinating work between Oxford University, Chinese Academy of Medical Sciences, and Nankai University.

She was elected a Fellow of the Academy of Medical Sciences in 2026.

== Research and publications ==
Dong's research has focused on understanding the factors that influence the quality of the immune system's T cell response to viral infections and viral associated cancer. Her work also looks at the effect of the gene variation IFTIM3 on viral infections, including Influenza.

- Zhang Y, Makvandi-Nejad S, Qin L, Zhao Y, Zhang T, Wang L, Repapi E, Taylor S et al.2015. Interferon-induced transmembrane protein-3 rs12252-C is associated with rapid progression of acute HIV-1 infection in Chinese MSM cohort. AIDS, 29(8), pp. 889–894
- Zhang H, Han X, Zhao B, An M, Wang Z, Jiang F, Xu J, Zhang Z, Dong T, Shang H. 2015. Multilayered HIV-1 gag-specific T-cell responses contribute to slow progression in HLA-A*30-B*13-C*06-positive patients. AIDS, 29 (9), pp. 993–1002.
- Jayasooriya S, De Silva T.I., Njie-Jobe J, Sanyang C, Leese A.M., Bell A.I., McAulay K.A., Yanchun P, Lonh H.M., Dong T, Whittle H.C., Rickinson A.B., Rowland-Jones S.L., Hislop A.D., Flanagan, K.L. . 2015. Early virological and immunological events in asymptomatic Epstein-Barr virus infection in African children. PLoS Pathog, 11 (3), pp. e1004746.
- PENG Y, WANG B, TALAAT K, KARRON R, POWELL TJ, ZENG H, DONG D, LUKE CJ, MCMICHAEL A, SUBBARAO K, DONG T. 2015. Boosted Influenza-Specific T Cell Responses after H5N1 Pandemic Live Attenuated Influenza Virus Vaccination. Front Immunol, 6 (JUN), pp. 287.
- ZHANG YH, ZHAO Y, LI N, PENG YC, GIANNOULATOU E, JIN RH, YAN HP, WU H, LIU JH, LIU N, WANG DY, SHU YL, HO LP, KELLAM P, MCMICHAEL A, DONG T . 2013. Interferon-induced transmembrane protein-3 genetic variant rs12252-C is associated with severe influenza in Chinese individuals. Nat Commun, 4 pp. 1418.
- ZHAO Y, ZHANG YH, DENNEY L, YOUNG D, POWELL TJ, PENG YC, LI N, YAN HP, WANG DY, SHU YL, KENDRICK Y, MCMICHAEL AJ, HO LP, DONG T . 2012. High levels of virus-specific CD4+ T cells predict severe pandemic influenza A virus infection. Am J Respir Crit Care Med, 186 (12), pp. 1292–1297.
- RAJAPAKSA US, LI D, PENG YC, MCMICHAEL AJ, DONG T, XU XN. 2012. HLA-B may be more protective against HIV-1 than HLA-A because it resists negative regulatory factor (Nef) mediated down-regulation. Proc Natl Acad Sci U S A, 109 (33), pp. 13353–13358.
