= Home for the Holidays =

Home for the Holidays may refer to:

== Film and television ==
- Home for the Holidays (1972 film), an American television slasher film
- Home for the Holidays (1995 film), an American film directed by Jodie Foster
- Home for the Holidays, a 2017 holiday special of the TV series Home: Adventures with Tip & Oh
- "Home for the Holidays" (Home Improvement), a 1998 television episode
- "Home for the Holidays" (Roseanne), a 1996 television episode

== Music ==
=== Albums ===
- Home for the Holidays (Anthony Hamilton album) or the title song, 2014
- Home for the Holidays (Darius Rucker album), 2014
- Home for the Holidays (Glen Campbell album), 1993
- Home for the Holidays (Lynn Anderson album), 1999
- Home for the Holidays (Mormon Tabernacle Choir album), 2013
- Home for the Holidays (Point of Grace album), 2010
- Home for the Holidays, by LVRN, with 6lack and Summer Walker, 2020

=== Songs ===
- "Home for the Holidays" (song), a 1954 song popularized by Perry Como
- "Home for the Holidays", a song by Destiny's Child from 8 Days of Christmas, 2001
- "Home for the Holidays", a song by J Cole from his 2010 mixtape Friday Night Lights (mixtape)
