= Prefix (disambiguation) =

A prefix is a part of a word attached to a beginning of a word which modifies the meaning of that stem.

- Possessive prefix, a prefix used in word formation for creation of various possessive forms

Prefix may also refer to:

- In computing science:
  - Prefix (computer science), a substring starting at the initial position of a reference string
  - Opcode prefix, numerical code that alters the function of a following opcode
  - Prefix is one of the attributes defined by the RDFa extension
  - Network address prefix, the initial part of a network address, used in address delegation and routing
  - Binary prefix, a name or associated symbol that can precede a unit of measure in computing to indicate multiplication by a power of two
- Prefix order (mathematics), a generalization of the notion of prefix of a string, and of the notion of a tree
- Numerical prefix, a prefix derived from the words for numbers in various languages, most commonly Greek and Latin
- SI prefix or metric prefix, a name or associated symbol that precedes a unit of measure (or its symbol) to form a decimal multiple or submultiple
- Descriptor (chemistry), a prefix placed before the systematic substance name for chemical compounds
- Prefix code, a type of code in coding theory
- Namespace identifier of a Unique identifier
  - Trunk prefix, the initial number to be dialled in a domestic telephone call
  - Telephone prefix, the first set of digits in a telephone number not a country code or area code
  - ITU prefix, a call sign for radio and television stations
  - Ship prefix, a combination of letters used in front of the name of a civilian or naval ship
- Honorific, a title (of courtesy) used before a person's name
- Prefix notation or Polish notation, a method of mathematical expression
- Prefix (acoustics), the initial part of the sound, one of J. F. Schouten's five major acoustic parameters

== See also ==
- Suffix (disambiguation)
