= Coming Home for Christmas =

Coming Home for Christmas may refer to:

- "Coming Home for Christmas" (song), a 2005 song by Banaroo
- Coming Home for Christmas (film), a 2013 Canadian television film

== See also ==
- "Coming Home This Christmas", a 2025 song by Jonas Brothers
