= Private Radio =

Studio album by Billy Bob Thornton
- Released: September 25, 2001
- Recorded: 2001
- Genre: Country
- Label: Lost Highway
- Producer: Marty Stuart

Billy Bob Thornton chronology
Private Radio (2001)	The Edge of the World (2003)

Professional ratings
Review scores
Source	Rating
Allmusic	link

Private Radio is the debut album by American actor and singer-songwriter Billy Bob Thornton. His first foray into recorded music following a successful movie career up to the time of the album's release, it was a traditional country music album released by Lost Highway Records in September 2001.

The song "Angelina" is a song written for his then-wife Angelina Jolie.

== Track listing ==
All tracks composed by Billy Bob Thornton and Marty Stuart; except where indicated

1. "Dark and Mad"
2. "Forever"
3. "Angelina" (Billy Bob Thornton, Randy Scruggs)
4. "Starlight Lounge" (Billy Bob Thornton, Dwight Yoakam, Holly Lamar)
5. "Walk of Shame"
6. "Smoking in Bed"
7. "Your Blue Shadow"
8. "That Mountain"
9. "He Was a Friend of Mine" (Roger McGuinn)
10. "Private Radio" (Billy Bob Thornton, Marty Stuart, Mark Collie)
11. "Beauty at the Back Door"
12. "Lost Highway" (Leon Payne)

== Personnel ==
- Billy Bob Thornton – vocals; drums on "Your Blue Shadow"
- Marty Stuart – guitar, mandolin; bass on "Your Blue Shadow"
- Brad Davis – guitar
- Steve Armold – bass
- Barry Beckett – organ
- Jim Cox – piano
- Gregg Stocki – drums, percussion
- Billy Bob Thornton, Brad Davis, Dennis Locorriere, Marty Stuart – backing vocals

with:

- Randy Scruggs – guitar, bass, co-production on "Angelina"
- Holly Lander – vocals on "Starlight Lounge"
- Larry Paxton – bass on "Starlight Lounge"
- Hank Singer – fiddle on "Lost Highway"
- Don Helms – pedal steel on "Lost Highway"

== Reception ==
A review at All Music stated, "Still, this is a pretty good record all the same, better than most Americana records of the late '90s, thanks in no small part to a terrific stretch of songs mid-record ("Walk of Shame," the rollicking "Smoking in Bed," "Your Blue Shadow," and "That Mountain"), and a good cover of Hank Williams' "Lost Highway."" PopMatters assessed the album in a similar manner: ". Is it country? Is it pop? Is it blues? Clearly drawing his influences from all of these genres, Billy Bob Thornton has made a record that makes us think a little bit about the differences that make the world interesting. Appropriately, “Lost Highway” (a song Hank Williams made famous) is the record’s last track. It’s time for the storyteller to leave the Starlight Lounge and hit the road again, in search of new people and experiences for new songs."
