= Jayne Mansfield's Car =

- Theatrical release poster
- Directed by: Billy Bob Thornton
- Written by: Billy Bob Thornton; Tom Epperson
- Produced by: Alexander Rodnyansky; Geyer Kosinski
- Starring: Robert Duvall; John Hurt; Billy Bob Thornton; Kevin Bacon; Robert Patrick; Ray Stevenson; Katherine LaNasa; Frances O'Connor
- Cinematography: Barry Markowitz
- Edited by: Lauren Zuckerman
- Music by: Owen Easterling Hatfield
- Production companies: A.R. Films; Aldamisa Entertainment; Media Talent Group
- Distributed by: Anchor Bay Films; Aldamisa Releasing
- Release dates: February 13, 2012 (Berlin); September 13, 2013 (United States)
- Running time: 122 minutes
- Countries: United States; Russia
- Language: English
- Box office: $79,178

Jayne Mansfield's Car is a 2012 American Southern Gothic black comedy-drama film directed by Billy Bob Thornton and cowritten by Thornton and his longtime collaborator Tom Epperson. The film marks Thornton's first directorial work since his 2000 film adaptation of the Cormac McCarthy novel All the Pretty Horses.

Featuring an ensemble cast of Thornton, Robert Duvall, John Hurt, Kevin Bacon, Robert Patrick, Ray Stevenson, Katherine LaNasa and Frances O'Connor, the film focuses on the effects of an elderly woman's death on two dysfunctional families she was part of when they meet together in 1960s rural Alabama for her funeral.

The film had its world premiere at the 62nd Berlin International Film Festival in February 2012. The film was released in limited release on September 13, 2013.

One of the locations in which the movie was shot is Cedartown, Georgia, USA. Exterior home shots were filmed in Troup County, Georgia, while additional scenes were shot in Decatur, Georgia. For the Greek Revival home, the interior shots were filmed at The Bailey-Tebault House located in Griffin, Georgia.

== Plot ==
The film is set in 1969 Morrison, Alabama. The Caldwell family includes two World War II veterans, their sister Donna, brother Jimbo and a patriarch, Jim, who is a World War I veteran. The Caldwells are involved in a cultural clash with the Bedfords, a family which includes Phillip, a World War II veteran, his sister Camilla, and their father Kingsley, also a World War I veteran.

The Bedfords are a London family in Morrison for the funeral of Kingsley's wife, who is the ex-wife of Jim Caldwell and the mother of Caldwell's children. Duvall described the film in an interview as "putting Tennessee Williams in the back seat".

The film's title refers to the automobile in which movie star Jayne Mansfield was supposedly decapitated in 1967. When a nearby town has a side show displaying the vehicle, Jim Caldwell takes Kingsley Bedford along to gawk at the grisly artifact.

== Cast ==
- Robert Duvall as Jim Caldwell, the patriarch of the Caldwell family and Naomi's ex-husband
- John Hurt as Kingsley Bedford, the patriarch of the Bedford family who Naomi leaves Jim for.
- Billy Bob Thornton as Skip Caldwell, a son of Jim and brother to Jimbo, Carroll, and Donna
- Kevin Bacon as Carroll Caldwell, a son of Jim and brother to Skip, Jimbo, and Donna
- Robert Patrick as Jimbo Caldwell, a son of Jim, and brother to Skip, Carroll, and Donna
- Ray Stevenson as Phillip Bedford, son of Kingsley
- Frances O'Connor as Camilla Bedford, daughter of Kingsley
- Katherine LaNasa as Donna Baron, a daughter of Jim, and sister to Skip, Jimbo, and Carroll
- Marshall Allman as Alan Caldwell, son of Jimbo and Jim's grandson
- Shawnee Smith as Vicky Caldwell, Jimbo's wife
- John Patrick Amedori as Mickey Caldwell, son of Carroll
- Ron White as Neil Baron, Donna's husband
- Irma P. Hall as Dorothy Lambert
- Carissa Capobianco as April Baron, daughter of Donna and Jim's granddaughter
- Karli Barnett as Autumn Baron, daughter of Donna and Jim's granddaughter
- Tippi Hedren as Naomi Caldwell (uncredited; her scenes were cut), Jim's deceased ex-wife and lover of Kingsley

== Reception ==
On the review aggregator website Rotten Tomatoes, 35% of 37 critics' reviews are positive, with an average rating of 5.4/10. The website's consensus reads: "Jayne Mansfield's Car assembles an impressive number of talented actors, but the screenplay — co-written by director and star Billy Bob Thornton — never gives them much of anything to do." Metacritic, which uses a weighted average, assigned the film a score of 48 out of 100, based on 18 critics, indicating "mixed or average" reviews.

PopMatters contributor J.C. Macek III found criticism in Thornton's unfocused direction of the multiple stories and the screenplay being more suited for a mini-series than a condensed two hour film filled with vignettes. He did however give praise to the performances for adding substance to their given arcs, singling out Bacon, O'Connor and White as the highlights. Norm Schrager from Paste commended Thornton's direction for bringing out great performances from the cast and his scenes having competent execution but felt the film overall suffered from "a distinctive lack of cohesiveness" throughout the script in its handling of plot concepts and themes, concluding that: "[T]here's something here. It just needs a clearer road to travel." Alonso Duralde of TheWrap also voiced problems with Thornton and Epperson's screenplay, calling it "too sprawling and [too] tidy" with its generational family drama and misuse of plot devices towards the third act. Claudia Puig of USA Today felt the familial themes were elevated by "intriguingly impressionistic cinematography and a strong ensemble cast", but criticized the characterization of both families for containing stereotypical rednecks and stuffy aristocrats that conduct "tedious monologues and theatrical speechifying" and the misuse of the film's title for lacking "insight and depth." She concluded that: "Self-indulgent, heavy-handed and lumbering, Jayne Mansfield's Car is not a wreck, but it's certainly a vehicle for boredom."
