= Elaine Fox =

Neuroscientist and researcher

- Born: 1963 (age 62–63); Dublin
- Education: University College Dublin
- Known for: Study of emotion
- Scientific career
- Workplaces: University College Dublin; Victoria University of Wellington; University of Oxford

Elaine Fox (born 1963) is a Professor of Psychology and Director of the Oxford Centre for Emotions and Affective Neuroscience (OCEAN) at the University of Oxford. Her research considers the science of emotion and what makes some people more resilient than others. As of 2019 Fox serves as the Mental Health Networks Impact and Engagement Coordinator for United Kingdom Research and Innovation.

== Early life and education ==
Fox grew up in Dublin. She studied neuroscience and psychology at the University College Dublin and remained there as a research associate until 1988. She worked in Dublin's St. James's Hospital. In 1988, Fox was appointed as a lecturer at the Victoria University of Wellington in New Zealand. She returned to the University College Dublin in 1993, where she worked as a Senior Lecturer for one year.

== Research and career ==
Fox moved to work at the University of Essex, where she was made a Professor in 2000. In 2007, she was elected Head of the Department of Psychology and the Centre for Brain Science. In 2013, Fox joined the University of Oxford. Here she directs the Oxford Centre for Emotions & Affective Neuroscience (OCEAN). She was awarded a European Research Council Advanced Investigator Award to study emotional vulnerability, resilience and optimism. In particular, she evaluates why people respond differently to adversity and success. She leads the Cog-BIAS project that looks at what makes particular people vulnerable to developing anxiety disorders. This involves evaluating at how biases in information processing (for example in attention, interpretation) impact emotions. She showed that using Attention Bias Modification (ABM) can be used to modify biased attention to develop emotional resilience. The origins of this bias modification are in the variation of serotonin transporter polymorphism. She found that people who worry more are less likely to be able to control their attention.

Fox identified that the people who inherit two copies of the long variant of the 5-HTTLPR gene avoid negative imagery. She concluded that these people were ready to seek out positive events – an optimistic streak, whilst people with the short variant of the 5-HTTLPR gene are more prone to negative experiences and anxiety. Her work was confirmed by Jan-Emmanuel De Neve, who identified that having two copies of the long variant of the 5-HTTLPR gene correlates with happiness in teenagers.

In October 2019, Fox was appointed the United Kingdom Research and Innovation (UKRI) Mental Health Networks Impact and Engagement Coordinator. In this capacity she will facilitate engagement between the UKRI's mental health networks. She has personally been awarded £450,000 funding to support these activities. The group will progress themes such as inequalities in accessing care, social isolation, student mental health and the value of local communities.

Her research has received significant media coverage, including on ABC News and BBC Horizon, as well as in The New York Times and The Economist. As part of her public engagement around psychology, Fox taught Michael Mosley to be more optimistic. During the experiment, Fox scanned Mosley's brain, and attributed his pessimism to the activity in his right front cortex. She has discussed the power of positivity and mental health with Claudia Hammond.

=== Selected publications ===
Her publications include:

- Fox, Elaine (2013). Rainy Brain, Sunny Brain: The New Science of Optimism and Pessimism. Arrow. ISBN 978-0099547556.
- Fox, Elaine (2008). Emotion Science: An Integration of Cognitive and Neuroscientific Approaches. Palgrave Macmillan. ISBN 978-0230005174.
- Fox, Elaine (2001). "Do threatening stimuli draw or hold visual attention in subclinical anxiety?". Journal of Experimental Psychology: General. 130 (4): 681–700. doi:10.1037/0096-3445.130.4.681. PMC 1924776. PMID 11757875.
