= Lisa Roy (publicist) =

American music publicist

Lisa Roy (died December 31, 2021) was an American Music Industry Publicist and Audio consultant. She had a company called Rock & Roy. Lisa was paid tribute by the 64th Annual Grammy Awards in In Memoriam sagement.

== Professional life ==
Roy’s client list spanned wide names and companies, such as Audio-Technica and Intel. She worked with artists like Tori Amos, Ben Folds, and Jimmy Jam & Terry Lewis, bridging the gap between creative and technical worlds in music production, taking the role as a connector. Even through personal challenges such as the loss of her husband, Csaba Petocz, Roy maintained her vibrant and supportive spirit, making a lasting impact on those around her.
