= A Family Thing =

1996 American film directed by Richard Pearce

- Directed by: Richard Pearce
- Written by: Billy Bob Thornton; Tom Epperson
- Produced by: Michael Hausman; Robert Duvall; Brad Wilson; Todd Black
- Starring: Robert Duvall; James Earl Jones
- Cinematography: Fred Murphy
- Edited by: Mark Warner
- Music by: Charles Gross
- Production company: United Artists
- Distributed by: MGM/UA Distribution Co. (United States); United International Pictures (International)
- Release date: March 29, 1996
- Running time: 109 minutes
- Country: United States
- Language: English
- Box office: $10,125,417

A Family Thing is a 1996 American Southern Gothic comedy-drama film directed by Richard Pearce and written by Billy Bob Thornton and Tom Epperson. The film features Robert Duvall as a farm equipment rental and dealership owner in rural Arkansas who travels to Chicago, Illinois to meet his long-lost half brother, portrayed by James Earl Jones, after discovering that his biological mother was an African-American maid to his family.

== Plot ==
Earl Pilcher, a (white) farm equipment rental company business owner in a rural small Arkansas town, receives a shocking letter from his (white) mother, Carrie, on her deathbed. She reveals that she was not Earl's biological mother. Earl's biological mother was actually an African-American maid named Willa Mae, raped by Earl's (white) father, who died giving birth to Earl. Carrie's dying wish is that Earl go to Chicago to meet his half-brother, Raymond Murdock. Earl confronts his feeble father, who refuses to discuss the letter, but admits it is true. Earl sets off to find his brother.

Working at City Hall as a police officer, Ray reluctantly agrees to meet Earl at a local diner. During lunch, Ray reveals that he knew all along that Earl was his half-brother and that he has hated Earl and his father because Earl's birth killed his mother. Ray wants nothing to do with Earl. Before leaving the city, Earl is beaten up and carjacked by four black street toughs and hospitalized. Finding Ray's information in Earl's pocket, the hospital staff calls Ray, who comes reluctantly. The doctor tells him that Earl may have a concussion and cannot travel for a couple of days. The hospital is full, so Ray must take Earl home to recuperate.

At Ray's home, Earl meets Willa Mae's sister, Ray's Aunt T—also his aunt—a kind, generous elderly blind woman. Ray's son Virgil, a surly and hostile city bus driver, doesn't appreciate a white southerner sleeping in his bed, even when Ray explains that Earl is an old war buddy whose life he saved. Aunt T reveals that she knows who Earl really is and later scolds Ray and Virgil for not welcoming a member of their family unconditionally.

Knowing he is not wanted, Earl leaves Ray's house, walking unknowingly into a bad part of town. At Aunt T's urging, Ray quickly locates Earl on a nearby street, but Earl obstinately refuses to come back. The two argue and end up in an awkward wrestling match, with Earl using the word "nigger," realizing too late that he has gone too far. Angry at Earl's callous words, Ray tells Earl to stay away from him and heads back home.

Wandering Chicago, Earl gets drunk at a bar, where he is tossed out for becoming obnoxiously overfriendly with a black couple in his eagerness to establish a sense of acceptance. He ends up sleeping under a bridge. The next morning, after cooling down, Ray finds Earl under a bridge. Earl apologizes for his rude behavior, and the two begin to settle their differences. They bond as they find similarities between them, both having served in the Marines and Navy, respectively, during the Korean War, and receiving lifelong scars. Ray reveals that as a child, motivated by hatred, he once threw a rock at Earl that could have blinded him. When Virgil's estranged wife and their two daughters visit, Earl learns that Virgil's promising career in football was shattered by an injury in college and that Virgil's resulting bitterness has alienated his family. Taking Virgil aside, Earl tells him an anecdote that highlights that dwelling on his disappointments hurts his wife and children. They begin to develop a grudging respect for each other.

The police find Earl's truck, bullet-ridden but operational, and Earl is ready to go home. Aunt T recounts to Earl and Ray the dramatic tale of the night Earl was born and Willa Mae died. Earl's life was saved by Carrie, who brought a white doctor to Willa Mae's shack to help with the delivery. Since Earl was born with white features, Carrie and Willa Mae agreed that Earl should be raised by Carrie and his biological father. Aunt T gives Earl a picture of Willa Mae, which Earl accepts with pride, as he has begun to accept his new family. Earl convinces Ray to return to their Arkansas hometown to find their mother's grave. Standing over her grave marker, Earl decides to take Ray to meet his family and tell them their story. Earl jokes that when his bigoted nephew finds out he is part black, Virgil's initial hostility will seem mild.

== Cast ==
- Robert Duvall as Earl Pilcher Jr.
- James Earl Jones as Raymond "Ray" Lee Murdoch, Earl's elder half-brother
- Michael Beach as Virgil Murdoch, Ray's son
- Irma P. Hall as Aunt T., Ray and Earl's maternal aunt
- David Keith as Sonny Pilcher, Earl & Ruby's son
- Grace Zabriskie as Ruby Pilcher, Earl's wife
- Regina Taylor as Ann Murdoch, Virgil's wife
- Mary Jackson as Carrie Pilcher, Earl's adopted mother
- Paula Marshall as Karen Pilcher, Earl's daughter
- James Harrell as Earl Pilcher Sr., Earl's father

== Reception ==
The movie received a positive reception. It holds a 73% "Fresh" rating at Rotten Tomatoes, based on 22 reviews.
