= Brad Davis (musician) =

American singer-songwriter

- Origin: Commerce, Texas, United States
- Genres: Country
- Occupation: Singer-songwriter
- Instruments: Guitar; mandolin; banjo; bass; vocals
- Years active: 1980s–present
- Website: braddavismusic.com

Brad Davis is an American country/bluegrass/rock guitar virtuoso and singer-songwriter. Guitar World Magazine named Brad as one of the greatest Texas guitarist of all time in 2022. Initially, a member of country singer Marty Stuart's road band, Davis has also performed with David Lee Roth, Bela Fleck, Roger Miller, David Lee Roth, Earl Scruggs, Sam Bush, Billy Bob Thornton, ZZ TOP and many others, in addition to writing songs for artists like Tim McGraw, Jo-El Sonnier, Tony Trischka, Tommy Shaw, and Thornton.

== Discography ==
- Climbin' Cole Hill (1995)
- No Gold on the Highway (wHiTe wAter, 1997)
- I'm Not Gonna Let My Blues Bring Me Down (2003)
- This World Ain't No Child (2004)
- Where the Bluegrass Grows: The Bluegrass Tribute to Tim McGraw (2006)
- The Bluegrass Tribute to Brad Paisley (2007)
