= List of Evening Shade episodes =

List of episodes for the television sitcom Evening Shade

The following is a list of episodes for the television sitcom Evening Shade. The series premiered on September 21, 1990 and ended on May 23, 1994, with a total of 101 episodes over the course of 4 seasons.

== Series overview ==
Season	Episodes	Originally released	
Season	Episodes	First released	Last released
1	25	September 21, 1990	May 6, 1991
2	25	September 16, 1991	May 18, 1992
3	25	September 21, 1992	May 17, 1993
4	26	September 20, 1993	May 23, 1994

== Episodes ==
=== Season 1 (1990–91) ===
No. overall	No. in season	Title	Directed by	Written by	Original release date	Prod. code	Viewers (millions)
1	1	"A Day in the Life of Wood Newton"	Harry Thomason	Linda Bloodworth-Thomason	September 21, 1990	0601	18.3
2	2	"A Day in the Life of Wood Newton"	Harry Thomason	Linda Bloodworth-Thomason	September 21, 1990	0601	18.3
3	3	"There Once Was a Boy Named Wood"	Harry Thomason	Linda Bloodworth-Thomason	September 28, 1990	0603	13.5
4	4	"Whatever Happened to Clutch Newton?"	Harry Thomason	David Nichols	October 5, 1990	0604	13.0
5	5	"Sadie Hawkins Dance"	David Steinberg	Stephen A. Miller	October 26, 1990	0612	11.8
6	6	"Fast Women"	Frank Booner	Linda Bloodworth-Thomason	October 29, 1990	0607	22.4
7	7	"The Moustache Show"	Burt Reynolds	Linda Bloodworth-Thomason	November 2, 1990	0608	13.2
8	8	"All for Charity"	Richard Kline	David Nichols	November 9, 1990	0610	13.4
9	9	"Something to Hold On To"	Burt Reynolds	Sean Clark	November 19, 1990	0605	18.8
10	10	"Mr. Mom"	David Steinberg	Sean Clark & David Nichols	November 26, 1990	0614	21.2
11	11	"Hooray for Wood"	Burt Reynolds	Linda Bloodworth-Thomason	December 10, 1990	0609	17.1
12	12	"The Wood Who Stole Christmas"	Harry Thomason	Story by : Allen Crowe & Lyle Weldon; Teleplay by : Linda Bloodworth Thomason	December 17, 1990	0616	18.8
13	13	"Wood and Ava and Gil and Madeline"	David Steinberg	Linda Bloodworth-Thomason	January 7, 1991	0617	22.0
14	14	"Wood's Thirtieth Reunion"	Burt Reynolds	Stephen A. Miller	January 21, 1991	0613	21.0
15	15	"Vote Early and Vote Often"	David Steinberg	Stephen A. Miller	January 28, 1991	0615	16.1
16	16	"Chip Off the Old Brick"	Burt Reynolds	Story by : Burt Reynolds; Teleplay by : Sean Clark & David Nichols	February 4, 1991	0618	18.8
17	17	"The Trials of Wood Newton"	David Steinberg	David Nichols	February 11, 1991	0606	20.7
18	18	"Into the Woods"	David Steinberg	Don Rhymer	February 18, 1991	0619	22.0
19	19	"Nothing to Fear But Harvey Lujack"	Burt Reynolds	Bill Dial	February 25, 1991	0620	21.4
20	20	"Gambler Anonymous"	David Steinberg	Stephen A. Miller	March 4, 1991	0621	21.5
21	21	"Sex Education"	Harry Thomason	Don Rhymer	March 24, 1991	0623	23.2
22	22	"I Am Wood, Hear Me Roar"	David Steinberg	Sean Clark	April 1, 1991	0622	15.1
23	23	"Herman and Margaret Sitting in a Tree"	Harry Thomason	Sean Clark & Stephen A. Miller and David Nichols & Don Rhymer	April 8, 1991	0627	17.2
24	24	"Far from the Madden Crowd"	Burt Reynolds	Sean Clark & Stephen A. Miller	April 29, 1991	0625	19.9
25	25	"The Baby Show"	Burt Reynolds	Don Rhymer	May 6, 1991	0626	18.5

=== Season 2 (1991–92) ===
No. overall	No. in season	Title	Directed by	Written by	Original release date	Prod. code	Viewers (millions)
26	1	"Three Naked Men: Part 1"	Burt Reynolds	Linda Bloodworth-Thomason	September 16, 1991	2605	25.2
27	2	"Three Naked Men: Part 2"	Burt Reynolds	Linda Bloodworth-Thomason	September 23, 1991	2606	25.9
28	3	"I'm with Stupid"	Harry Thomason	David Nichols	September 30, 1991	2604	22.1
29	4	"Tying the Knot"	Burt Reynolds	Don Rhymer	October 7, 1991	2602	24.6
30	5	"Miss Emily's Wild Ride"	Harry Thomason	Thom Bray & Michael Ross	October 14, 1991	2601	23.3
31	6	"The Road Trip"	Burt Reynolds	Don Rhymer	October 21, 1991	2607	21.3
32	7	"Winning Isn't Everything"	Burt Reynolds	James Hampton	November 4, 1991	2608	22.9
33	8	"Where's My Watch?"	Harry Thomason	Don Rhymer	November 11, 1991	2609	23.0
34	9	"I Do, I Don't"	Harry Thomason	Don Rhymer	November 18, 1991	2613	23.1
35	10	"The Thanksgiving Show"	Charles Nelson Reilly	David Nichols	November 25, 1991	2610	23.9
36	11	"Busted"	Harry Thomason	David Nichols & Don Rhymer	December 9, 1991	2614	22.4
37	12	"Rear Window"	Charles Nelson Reilly	Michael A. Ross & Thom Bray	December 16, 1991	2611	22.3
38	13	"The Getaway"	Burt Reynolds	James Hampton	January 6, 1992	2621	22.7
39	14	"Herman in Charge"	Burt Reynolds	James Hampton	January 13, 1992	2603	23.0
40	15	"The Au Pair Affair"	Burt Reynolds	David Nichols	January 27, 1992	2615	23.7
41	16	"Goin' to the Chapel: Part 1"	Harry Thomason	Linda Bloodworth-Thomason	February 3, 1992	2617	23.6
42	17	"Goin' to the Chapel: Part 2"	Harry Thomason	Linda Bloodworth-Thomason	February 24, 1992	2618	24.0
43	18	"Goin' to the Chapel: Part 3"	Harry Thomason	Linda Bloodworth-Thomason	March 2, 1992	2624	23.2
44	19	"Play Herman for Me"	Charles Frank	Brian Bird & John Wierick	March 9, 1992	2616	24.0
45	20	"Callous Hearts of Rage"	Burt Reynolds	Don Rhymer	March 23, 1992	2622	24.0
46	21	"Taylor Buys a Car"	James Hampton	Paul Clay	April 6, 1992	2625	17.4
47	22	"Hasta la Vista, Baby"	James Hampton	Story by : James Hampton; Teleplay by : Michael A. Ross & Thom Bray	May 4, 1992	2627	19.8
48	23	"Cousin Readith"	Burt Reynolds	Thom Bray & Michael A. Ross	May 11, 1992	2623	19.1
49	24	"No Pain, No Gain"	Burt Reynolds	Victor Fresco	May 18, 1992	2626	19.2
50	25	"The Perfect Birthday Party, Sort Of"	Michael Jeter	David Nichols & Don Rhymer	May 18, 1992	2628	25.5

=== Season 3 (1992–93) ===
No. overall	No. in season	Title	Directed by	Written by	Original release date	Prod. code	Viewers (millions)
51	1	"First Heroes"	Burt Reynolds	Story by : Linda Bloodworth-Thomason & Burt Reynolds; Teleplay by : Linda Bloodworth-Thomason	September 21, 1992	3618	23.6
52	2	"The Diary of Molly Newton"	James Hampton	Michael A. Ross & Thom Bray	September 28, 1992	3605	23.4
53	3	"You Scratch My Back, I'll Arrest You"	Charles Frank	Victor Fresco	October 5, 1992	3606	22.9
54	4	"What a Night"	Burt Reynolds	Don Rhymer	October 12, 1992	3610	21.3
55	5	"Father-Child Campout"	James Hampton	Don Rhymer	October 19, 1992	3609	21.1
56	6	"The Whole Story"	Charles Nelson Reilly	Victor Fresco	October 26, 1992	3619	21.3
57	7	"Harlan Deals a Meal"	Charles Nelson Reilly	Don Rhymer	November 9, 1992	3615	21.3
58	8	"The Resurrection of Wood Newton"	James Hampton	Story by : Burt Reynolds & David Nichols; Teleplay by : David Nichols	November 16, 1992	3608	20.7
59	9	"The NFL on CBS"	Burt Reynolds	Victor Fresco	November 23, 1992	3613	21.6
60	10	"The Really Odd Couple"	James Hampton	David Nichols	December 7, 1992	3612	21.8
61	11	"Bring Me the Head of Carl the Mule"	Burt Reynolds	Michael A. Ross & Thom Bray	December 14, 1992	3616	19.8
62	12	"I'll Be Home for Christmas"	Burt Reynolds	Thom Bray & Michael A. Ross	December 21, 1992	3621	21.9
63	13	"Frieda and the Preacher"	James Hampton	James Hampton	January 4, 1993	3607	23.9
64	14	"Private School"	Robby Benson	Don Rhymer	January 18, 1993	3626	22.9
65	15	"Ava Takes a Shower: Part 1"	Burt Reynolds	Victor Fresco & Don Rhymer	February 1, 1993	3624	21.6
66	16	"Ava Takes a Shower: Part 2"	Burt Reynolds	Victor Fresco & Don Rhymer	February 8, 1993	3630	23.4
67	17	"They Can't Take That Away from Me"	Burt Reynolds	David Nichols	February 15, 1993	3628	23.4
68	18	"They Can't Take That Away from Me"	Burt Reynolds	David Nichols	February 15, 1993	3628	23.4
69	19	"She What?!"	James Hampton	Thom Bray & Michael A. Ross	March 1, 1993	3629	21.1
70	20	"Another Baby Show"	James Hampton	Story by : David Nichols; Teleplay by : Thom Bray & Michael A. Ross	March 15, 1993	3632	22.0
71	21	"Cousins Behind Bars"	Burt Reynolds	Don Rhymer	March 22, 1993	3631	21.5
72	22	"Mommy Goes AWOL"	James Hampton	Victor Fresco	April 12, 1993	3627	17.8
73	23	"Teaching Is a Good Thing"	Robby Benson	Victor Fresco	May 3, 1993	3614	18.6
74	24	"Saint Bobby"	Burt Reynolds	James Hampton	May 10, 1993	3620	15.2
75	25	"The Graduation"	Robby Benson	Story by : Victor Fresco; Teleplay by : Thom Bray & Michael A. Ross	May 17, 1993	3633	16.9

=== Season 4 (1993–94) ===
No. overall	No. in season	Title	Directed by	Written by	Original release date	Prod. code	Viewers (millions)
76	1	"Four Naked Women"	Harry Thomason	Victor Fresco	September 20, 1993	4604	21.1
77	2	"One Down, Three to Go"	Burt Reynolds	James Hampton	September 27, 1993	4601	19.9
78	3	"One Hot Game"	Burt Reynolds	Victor Fresco	October 4, 1993	4603	18.3
79	4	"Witness for the Prosecution"	James Hampton	Thom Bray & Michael A. Ross	October 11, 1993	4602	19.1
80	5	"Kiss of the Ice Cream Woman"	Burt Reynolds	Craig Hoffman	October 18, 1993	4605	17.9
81	6	"Night of the Living Newtons"	James Hampton	Allen Crowe	October 25, 1993	4607	19.6
82	7	"The Dance"	James Hampton	Michael A. Ross & Thom Bray	November 1, 1993	4606	20.3
83	8	"Wood and Evan's Excellent Adventure"	Robby Benson	Kim Friese	November 8, 1993	4608	18.9
84	9	"Small Town Girl"	Burt Reynolds	Susan Cridland Wick	November 15, 1993	4612	19.8
85	10	"Where There's Smoke"	Robby Benson	Craig Hoffman	November 22, 1993	4609	19.4
86	11	"Chain of Fools"	Robby Benson	Victor Fresco	November 29, 1993	4613	19.7
87	12	"Sleepless in Arkansas"	Robby Benson	Danny Zuker	December 13, 1993	4611	19.6
88	13	"The Proof Is in the Pudding"	James Hampton	Kim Friese	December 20, 1993	4615	18.8
89	14	"The People's Choice"	Robby Benson	Thom Bray & Michael A. Ross	January 3, 1994	4614	21.0
90	15	"Educating Calvin"	Burt Reynolds	Brent Briscoe & Mark Fauser	January 10, 1994	4610	20.8
91	16	"Paint the Town Nude"	Charles Frank	Danny Zuker	January 24, 1994	4617	20.0
92	17	"The Perfect Woman"	James Hampton	Danny Zuker	January 31, 1994	4620	21.3
93	18	"It's a Mad, Mad, Mad Wood"	Charles Frank	Craig Hoffman	February 7, 1994	4621	18.0
94	19	"The Fabulous Fraizer Girls"	Burt Reynolds	Craig Hoffman	February 28, 1994	4619	20.3
95	20	"I Did, I Did"	Dennis Erdman	Bob Lowry	March 7, 1994	4616	20.8
96	21	"Mr. Newton Goes to Hot Springs"	Harry Thomason	Susan Cridland Wick	March 14, 1994	4622	19.3
97	22	"Who's Afraid of the Big Bad Wood?"	James Hampton	Michael A. Ross & Thom Bray	March 28, 1994	4623	17.7
98	23	"Wood Climbs to New Heights"	Robert Ginty	Allen Crowe	April 11, 1994	4624	17.2
99	24	"Mama Knows Best"	John Ratzenberger	Mark Fauser & Brent Briscoe	May 9, 1994	4618	15.8
100	25	"The Odder Couple"	Sheldon Epps	Leslie Rieder	May 16, 1994	4625	15.0
101	26	"I Left My Ring in Evening Shade"	Burt Reynolds	Kim Friese & Susan Cridland Wick	May 23, 1994	4626	13.5
