= Louisa Edwards =

American author

The Honourable Louisa Edwards
- Born: Mary Louisa Edwards; November 4, 1979 (age 46); Austin, TX, United States
- Education: Bryn Mawr College
- Occupation: Novelist
- Spouse: Nicholas White
- Writing career
- Pen name: Louisa Edwards; Lily Everett
- Period: 2009–present
- Genre: Romance
- Website: www.louisaedwards.com

Louisa Edwards (born Mary Louisa Edwards on November 4, 1979) is an American author of contemporary romance novels. Before becoming a novelist, she was a book editor and restaurant reviewer, and her novels incorporate her love of food with their focus on chefs at high-class restaurants. Edwards also writes the Sanctuary Island series under the name Lily Everett.

Edwards lives in Austin, Texas, with her husband, Nicholas White, the founder of the online news site, The Daily Dot.

== Bibliography ==
=== As Lily Everett ===
- Sanctuary Island, St. Martin's Press, 2013
- Shoreline Drive, St. Martin's Press, 2014
- Homecoming, St. Martin's Press, 2014
- Heartbreak Cove, St. Martin's Press, 2015
- Home For Christmas, St. Martin's Press, 2015
- Three Promises, St. Martin's Press, 2016

=== As Louisa Edwards ===
- Can’t Stand the Heat, St. Martin’s Press, 2009
- On the Steamy Side, St. Martin’s Press, 2010
- Just One Taste, St. Martin’s Press, 2010
- Too Hot to Touch, St. Martin’s Press, 2011
- Some Like It Hot, St. Martin’s Press, 2011
- Hot Under Pressure, St. Martin’s Press, 2012
