= Jessica Scott =

Jessica Scott is an American author of contemporary military romance, supernatural suspense, and nonfiction about soldiers returning from the Iraq War and War in Afghanistan.

== Biography ==
=== Education ===
She holds a PhD in Sociology from Duke University.

=== Military career ===
Scott was a former Sergeant First Class before she commissioned at Officer Candidate School at Fort Benning.

=== Literary career ===
Scott is the author of the Homefront series and the Falling series, both about soldiers and veterans adjusting to life after returning from the wars in Iraq and Afghanistan. Her bestselling Falling series features soldiers integrating into life on college campuses.

She has also written for the New York Times "At War" blog, PBS POV, and Iraq and Afghanistan Veterans of America.

Her debut novel Because of You launched the return of Random House's "Loveswept" digital imprint. She was featured as one of Esquire Magazine's Americans of the Year for 2012.

== Bibliography ==
=== Coming Home series ===
- Because of You (2011)
- Anything for You (2011)
- Until There Was You - Loveswept (2012)
- I'll Be Home for Christmas (2013)
- Back to You - Grand Central Forever (2014)
- All for You - Grand Central Forever (2014)
- It's Always Been You - Grand Central Forever (2014)

=== Homefront series ===
- Come Home to Me (2014)
- Homefront (2015)
- After the War (2015)
- Into the Fire (Previously Forged in Fire) (2015)

=== Falling series ===
- Before I Fall (2015)
- Break My Fall (2016)
- After I Fall (2017)
- Until I Fall (2018)

=== Supernatural suspense ===
- The Long Night (2016)

=== Nonfiction ===
- The Long Way Home: One Mom's Journey Home from War (2013)
- To Iraq & Back: On War and Writing (2014)
