= Billy Bob Thornton =

American actor, filmmaker and singer-songwriter (born 1955)

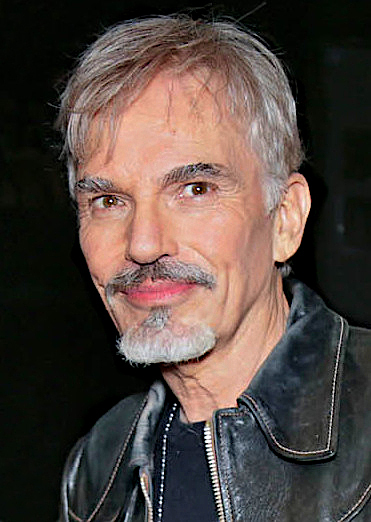
- Thornton in February 2017
- Born: August 4, 1955 (age 71); Hot Springs, Arkansas, U.S.
- Occupations: Actor; filmmaker; screenwriter; singer; songwriter
- Years active: 1974–present
- Works: Filmography; discography
- Spouses: Melissa Lee Gatlin (m. 1978; div. 1980) Toni Lawrence (m. 1986; div. 1988) Cynda Williams (m. 1990; div. 1992) Pietra Dawn Cherniak (m. 1993; div. 1997) Angelina Jolie (m. 2000; div. 2003) Connie Angland (m. 2014)
- Children: 4
- Awards: Full list
- Musical career
- Genre: Alternative country
- Instruments: Vocals; drums
- Label: Vanguard
- Member of: The Boxmasters
- Website: billybobthornton.net

William Robert "Billy Bob" Thornton (born August 4, 1955) is an American actor, filmmaker, screenwriter, and singer-songwriter. He received international attention after writing, directing and starring in the independent drama film Sling Blade (1996), for which he won an Academy Award for Best Adapted Screenplay and was nominated for an Academy Award for Best Actor. For his role in A Simple Plan (1998), he was nominated for the Academy Award for Best Supporting Actor.

Thornton is known for his film roles in One False Move (1992), Tombstone (1993), Dead Man (1995), Sling Blade (1996), U Turn (1997), Primary Colors (1998), Armageddon (1998), Monster's Ball (2001), The Man Who Wasn't There (2001), Intolerable Cruelty (2003), Bad Santa (2003), and Friday Night Lights (2004). He has written a variety of films, including A Family Thing (1996) and The Gift (2000) and has directed films such as All the Pretty Horses (2000), Daddy and Them (2001) and Jayne Mansfield's Car (2012).

Thornton is also known for his roles on television acting in the CBS sitcom Hearts Afire from 1992 to 1995. In 2014, he starred as Lorne Malvo in the first season of the FX anthology series Fargo, earning a nomination for the Primetime Emmy Award for Outstanding Lead Actor in a Miniseries or Movie and winning a Golden Globe Award for Best Actor in a Miniseries or Television Film. From 2016 to 2021, he played Billy McBride in the Amazon legal drama series Goliath, which earned him a Golden Globe Award for Best Actor – Television Series Drama. In 2024, he began playing the lead role of Tommy Norris in the Paramount+ series Landman.

Thornton has released four solo albums and is the vocalist of the rock band the Boxmasters. Thornton has been vocal about his distaste for celebrity culture, choosing to avoid the public eye. He has been married six times, including to Angelina Jolie from 2000 to 2003.

== Early life ==
Thornton was born on August 4, 1955, in Hot Springs, Arkansas, the son of Virginia Roberta (née Faulkner; 1934–2017), a self-proclaimed psychic, and William Raymond "Billy Ray" Thornton (1929–1974), a high school history teacher and basketball coach. His brother Jimmy Don (April 1958 – October 1988) wrote a number of songs; Thornton recorded two of them ("Island Avenue" and "Emily") on his solo albums. He is of English and part Irish descent. He has two other siblings.

Thornton lived in numerous places in Arkansas during his childhood, including Alpine, Malvern, and Mount Holly. He was raised Methodist. He attended Malvern High School. Thornton struggled academically in school due to dyslexia, for which he was not conclusively diagnosed until later in life. He worked several odd jobs the next few years, including as a roadie, drill press operator, bulldozer operator, and a sawmill worker. A good high school baseball player, he tried out for the Kansas City Royals but was released after an injury. He graduated from Malvern in 1973 and spent a short period laying asphalt for the Arkansas State Transportation Department, before attending Henderson State University to pursue a degree in psychology but dropped out after two semesters.

In the mid-1980s Thornton settled in Los Angeles to pursue his career as a musician with future writing partner Tom Epperson. He had a difficult time succeeding as a musician and worked in telemarketing, offshore wind farming, and fast food management while also auditioning for acting jobs. He played the drums and sang with South African rock band Jack Hammer. While working as a waiter for an industry event, he served film director and screenwriter Billy Wilder. He struck up a conversation with Wilder, who advised Thornton to consider a career as a screenwriter.

== Acting career ==
=== 1987–1995: Early roles and breakthrough ===
In September 1987, Thornton appeared on stage in a one-act play, Beethoven Symphonies, as part of the West Coast Theatre Ensemble in Los Angeles. His first on-screen acting role was playing a hillbilly named Billy Bob in the exploitation film Hunter's Blood. He was a stand-in on that film for the whole production, and then appeared in two scenes.

He subsequently appeared in minor roles in the film South of Reno and the 1987 Matlock episode "The Photographer". In 1989, he appeared as an angry heckler in Adam Sandler's debut film Going Overboard, and in 1992, he played the role of the villain in One False Move, which he also co-wrote with Tom Epperson. Another one of his early screen roles was as a cast member on the CBS sitcom Hearts Afire from 1992 to 1995. He also had roles in the 1990s films Tombstone (1993), Bound by Honor (1993), Indecent Proposal (1993), On Deadly Ground (1994), and Dead Man (1995).

=== 1996–2004: Sling Blade and acclaim ===
He went on to write, direct, and star in the 1996 independent film Sling Blade. The film, an expansion of the short film Some Folks Call It a Sling Blade, introduced the story of a mentally disabled man imprisoned for a gruesome and seemingly inexplicable murder. Sling Blade garnered international acclaim. Thornton's screenplay earned him an Academy Award for Best Adapted Screenplay, a Writers Guild of America Award, and an Edgar Award, while his performance received Oscar and Screen Actors Guild nominations for Best Actor. That same year, Thornton and Epperson co-wrote the comedy drama film A Family Thing.

Thornton appeared in several major film roles following the success of Sling Blade. In 1997, he played Darrell the mechanic in Oliver Stone's U Turn. In 1998, he portrayed the James Carville-like Richard Jemmons in Primary Colors. That same year, he appeared in the disaster film Armageddon, and the neo-noir thriller film A Simple Plan, the latter of which earned him a nomination for the Academy Award for Best Supporting Actor. His screen persona has been described by the press as that of a "tattooed, hirsute man's man".

Thornton adapted the book All the Pretty Horses into a 2000 film of the same name. The negative experience (he was forced to cut more than an hour of footage) led to his decision to never direct another film; a subsequent release, Daddy and Them, had been filmed earlier. Also in 2000, an early script which he and Epperson wrote together was made into The Gift, In 2001, he directed Daddy and Them while securing starring roles in three Hollywood films: the romantic drama Monster's Ball, the crime comedy-drama Bandits, and the neo-noir film The Man Who Wasn't There. In 2002, Thornton appeared in Travis Tritt's music video for the song "Modern Day Bonnie and Clyde".

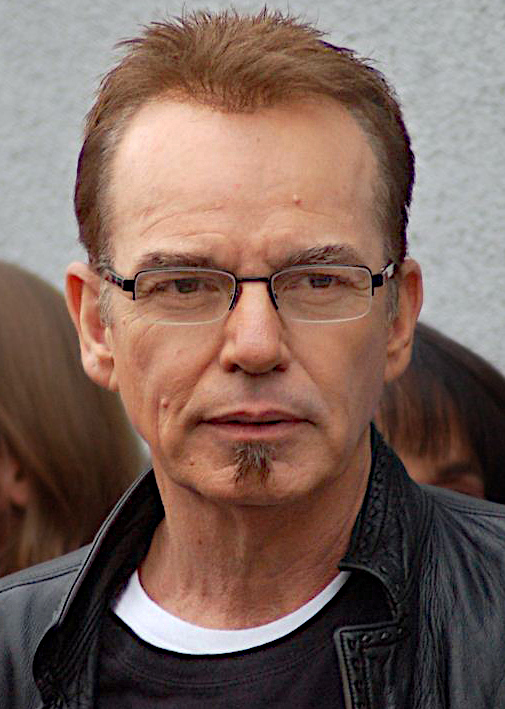
Thornton in 2012

Thornton played a malicious mall Santa in 2003's Bad Santa, a black comedy on the set of which he has admitted to getting drunk, and in the same year, portrayed an oil millionaire in the comedy film Intolerable Cruelty, and a womanizing President of the United States in the British romantic comedy film Love Actually. He stated that, following the success of Bad Santa, audiences "like to watch him play that kind of guy" and that "casting directors call him up when they need an asshole". He referred to this when he said that "it's kinda that simple... you know how narrow the imagination in this business can be". In 2004, Thornton starred as Davy Crockett in The Alamo, and played Coach Gary Gaines in the football drama film Friday Night Lights. Also that year, he received a star on the Hollywood Walk of Fame on October 7.

=== 2005–2013: Career fluctuations ===
He played a baseball coach in the 2005 sports comedy Bad News Bears, a remake of the 1976 film of the same name. He appeared in the 2006 comic film School for Scoundrels. In the latter film, he plays a self-help doctor, a role which was written specifically for him. Other films include the 2007 drama The Astronaut Farmer and the comedy Mr. Woodcock, in which he played a sadistic gym teacher. In September 2008, he starred in the action film Eagle Eye. He has also expressed an interest in directing another film, possibly a period piece about cave explorer Floyd Collins, based on the book Trapped!: The Story of Floyd Collins. In 2011, Thornton voiced Jack in the animated comedy film Puss in Boots. In 2012, he co-wrote (with Epperson), directed and starred in the film Jayne Mansfield's Car.

=== Since 2014: Fargo, Goliath and Landman ===
In 2014, he starred as sociopathic hitman Lorne Malvo in the FX miniseries Fargo, inspired by the 1996 film of the same name, for which he won a Golden Globe for Best Actor in a Mini-Series. Thornton made a guest appearance on The Big Bang Theory in 2014, where he played a middle-aged urologist who gets excited about every woman who touches him. That same year, he played a prosecutor in the legal drama The Judge. In 2015, Thornton appeared in Entourage, the film adaptation of the television series.

Goliath, a television series by Amazon Studios, featured Thornton as a formerly brilliant and personable lawyer, who is now washed up and alcoholic. It premiered on October 13, 2016, on Amazon Prime Video. Goliath was renewed for two additional seasons, with the final season released on September 24, 2021. Also in 2016, he reprised his role as a bad mall Santa in Bad Santa 2.

In 2017, Thornton starred in the music video "Stand Down" by Kario Salem (musically known as K.O.). It received the Best Music Video award from the Toronto Shorts International Film Festival.

Since 2024, Thornton has starred in Landman as Tommy Norris, a landman at an oil company.

== Music career ==
=== Early music career ===
In the 1970s, Thornton was the drummer of a blues rock band named Tres Hombres. Guitarist Billy Gibbons, whose band ZZ Top released an album titled Tres Hombres in 1973, referred to the band as "the best little cover band in Texas", and Thornton bears a tattoo with the band's name on it. In 1983, the band released their only studio album, Gunslinger on Trigger Records.

In 1985, Thornton joined Piet Botha in the South African rock band Jack Hammer, while Botha worked in Los Angeles. Thornton recorded one studio album with Jack Hammer, Death of a Gypsy, which was released in September 1986.

In 2001, Thornton released the album Private Radio on Lost Highway Records. Subsequent albums include The Edge of the World (2003), Hobo (2005) and Beautiful Door (2007). He performed the Warren Zevon song The Wind on the tribute album Enjoy Every Sandwich: Songs of Warren Zevon. Thornton recorded a cover of the Johnny Cash classic "Ring of Fire" with Earl Scruggs, for the Oxford American magazine's Southern Music CD in 2001. The song also appeared on Scruggs' 2001 album Earl Scruggs and Friends.

=== The Boxmasters (2007–2010, 2015–present) ===
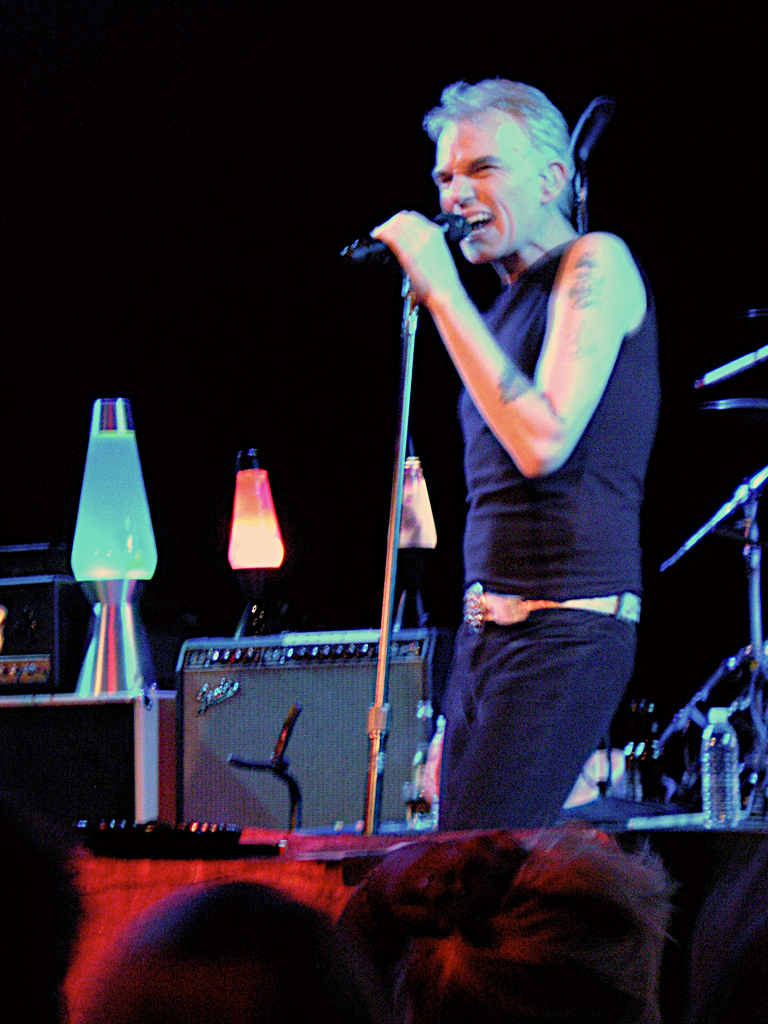
Thornton with The Boxmasters, 2007

In 2007, Thornton formed The Boxmasters with J.D. Andrew.

On April 8, 2009, Thornton and The Boxmasters appeared on the CBC Radio One program Q. The appearance was widely criticized and received international attention after Thornton was persistently unintelligible and discourteous to host Jian Ghomeshi. Thornton eventually explained that he had instructed the show's producers to not ask questions about his movie career. Ghomeshi had mentioned Thornton's acting in the introduction. Thornton had also complained Canadian audiences were like "mashed potatoes without the gravy." The following night, opening for Willie Nelson at Toronto's Massey Hall, Thornton said mid-set he liked Canadians but not Ghomeshi, which was greeted with boos and catcalls. The Boxmasters did not continue the tour in Canada as, according to Thornton, some of the crew and band had the flu.

== Personal life ==
=== Marriages and family ===
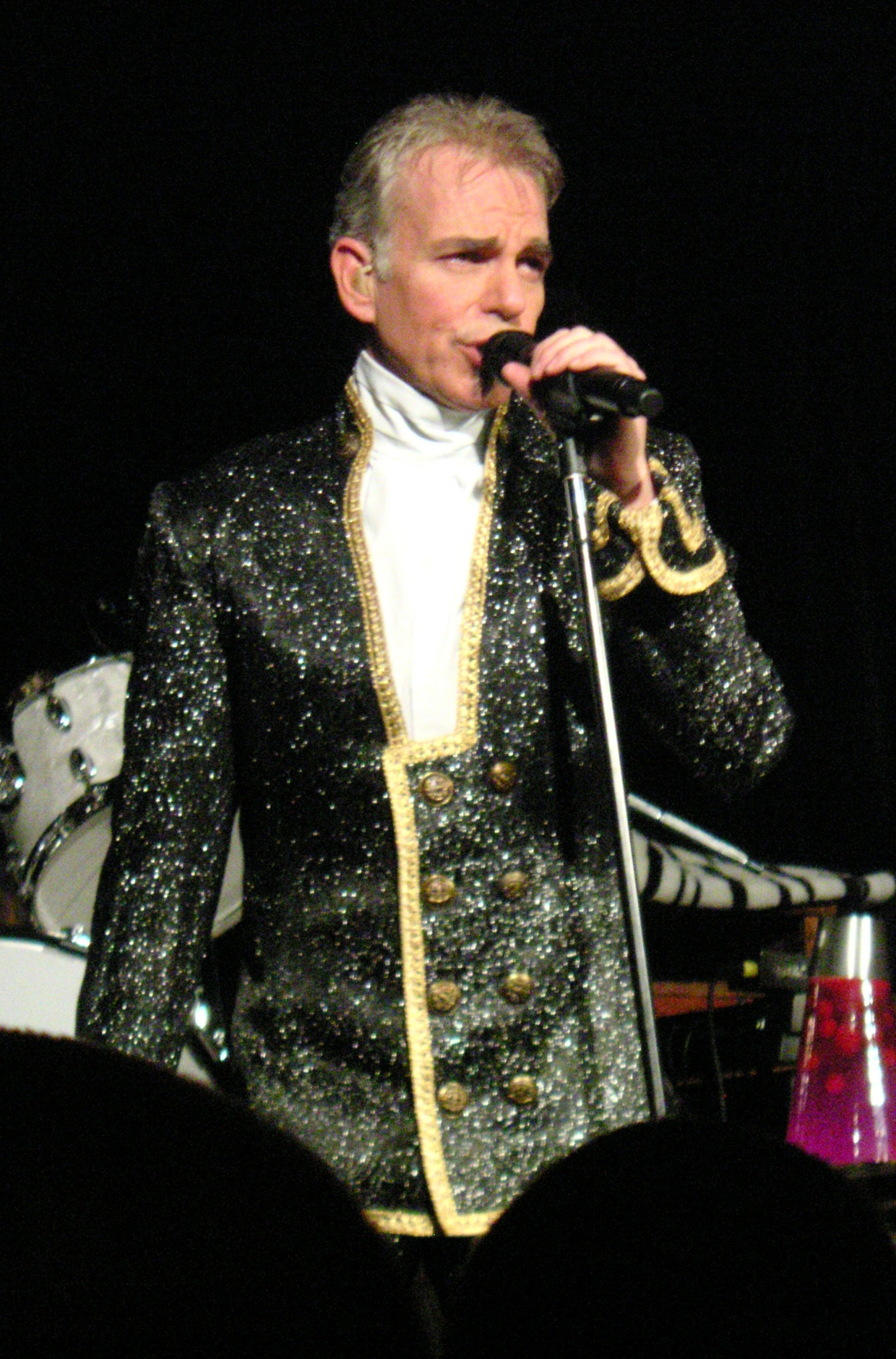
Thornton with the Boxmasters, 2007

Thornton has been divorced five times and is married to his sixth wife. He has four children by three women.

From 1978 to 1980, he was married to Melissa Lee Gatlin, who in her divorce petition cited "incompatibility and adultery on his part". They have a daughter Amanda (Brumfield), who in 2008 was sentenced to 20 years in prison for the death of her friend's one-year-old daughter. The Innocence Project of Florida began representing Amanda in 2015 and claims that the child's death was entirely accidental. Amanda was freed in 2020 after a deal was reached with prosecutors prior to an evidentiary hearing to provide medical and scientific evidence of her innocence.

Thornton married actress Toni Lawrence in 1986; they separated the following year and divorced in 1988. From 1990 to 1992, he was married to actress Cynda Williams, who was cast in his writing debut One False Move (1992). In 1993, Thornton married Playboy model Pietra Dawn Cherniak, with whom he had two sons. The marriage ended in 1997 with Cherniak accusing Thornton of spousal abuse, sometimes in front of his children.

Thornton dated Laura Dern from 1997 to 1999, and in 2000, he married actress Angelina Jolie, with whom he starred in Pushing Tin (1999) and who was nearly 20 years his junior. The marriage became known for the couple's eccentric displays of affection, which reportedly included wearing vials of each other's blood around their necks; Thornton later clarified that the "vials" were actually two small lockets, each containing only a single drop of blood. Thornton and Jolie announced the adoption of a child from Cambodia in March 2002, but it was later revealed that Jolie had adopted the child as a single parent. They separated in June 2002 and divorced the following year.

In 2003, Thornton began a relationship with makeup effects crew member Connie Angland, with whom he has a daughter. Although he once said that he likely would not marry again since marriage "doesn't work" for him, his representatives confirmed that he and Angland were married on October 22, 2014, in Los Angeles.

=== Health problems ===
During his early years in Los Angeles, Thornton was admitted to a hospital and diagnosed with myocarditis, a heart condition thought to be brought on by his diet. He has since said that he follows a vegan diet and is "extremely healthy", eating no junk food as he is allergic to wheat and dairy. In 2026, Thornton elaborated that he has the "A-B negative" blood type, which caused him to have fewer digestive enzymes and made him allergic to wheat, dairy, shellfish and meat.

Thornton has dyslexia and obsessive–compulsive disorder. Various idiosyncratic behaviors have been well documented in interviews with Thornton; among these is a phobia of antique furniture, a disorder shared by Dwight Yoakam's character Doyle Hargraves in the Thornton-penned Sling Blade and by Thornton's own character in the 2001 film Bandits. Additionally, he has stated that he has a fear of certain types of silverware, a trait assumed by his character in 2001's Monster's Ball, in which he insists on a plastic spoon for his daily bowl of ice cream.

In a 2004 interview with The Independent, Thornton explained,

It's just that I won't use real silver. You know, like the big, old, heavy-ass forks and knives, I can't do that. It's the same thing as the antique furniture. I just don't like old stuff. I'm creeped out by it, and I have no explanation why ... I don't have a phobia about American antiques, it's mostly French—you know, like the big, old, gold-carved chairs with the velvet cushions. The Louis XIV type. That's what creeps me out. I can spot the imitation antiques a mile off. They have a different vibe. Not as much dust.

=== Interests ===
Thornton is a baseball fan, particularly a fan of the St. Louis Cardinals. In his movie contracts, one of his conditions is a television in his trailer with a satellite dish so he can watch the Cardinals play. He narrated The 2006 World Series Film, the year-end retrospective DVD chronicling the Cardinals' championship season. He is also a professed fan of the Indianapolis Colts football team.

Asked about faith, Thornton said: "I'm not what you'd call a traditional religious person. We went to the Methodist church—every Sunday you put on your little creepy suit with your clip-on tie and went to church. But it wasn't like I paid any attention. Hardcore Christians and atheists—they both say they know exactly what the deal is. Anybody who says, 'I know what happens,' I don't believe them. That's kind of my religion."

== Filmography and awards ==
Thornton has received the President's Award from the Academy of Science Fiction, Fantasy & Horror Films, a Special Achievement Award from the National Board of Review, and a star on the Hollywood Walk of Fame. He has also been nominated for an Emmy Award, four Golden Globes, and three Screen Actors Guild Awards. July 27th 2026 Billy Bob was inducted into the SC Entertainment and Music Hall of Fame for significant contribution to the growth and advancement of South Carolina’s entertainment industry and creative community.

== Discography ==
Studio albums

- Private Radio (2001)
- The Edge of the World (2003)
- Hobo (2005)
- Beautiful Door (2007)
