= All the Pretty Horses (film) =

2000 Western film

- Theatrical release poster
- Directed by: Billy Bob Thornton
- Screenplay by: Ted Tally
- Based on: All the Pretty Horses by Cormac McCarthy
- Produced by: Robert Salerno; Billy Bob Thornton
- Starring: Matt Damon; Henry Thomas; Lucas Black; Penélope Cruz; Rubén Blades; Robert Patrick; Bruce Dern; Sam Shepard
- Cinematography: Barry Markowitz
- Edited by: Sally Menke
- Music by: Marty Stuart; Kristin Wilkinson; Larry Paxton
- Production companies: Miramax Films; Columbia Pictures
- Distributed by: Columbia TriStar Film Distributors International
- Release date: December 25, 2000
- Running time: 117 minutes
- Country: United States
- Languages: English; Spanish
- Budget: $57 million
- Box office: $18.1 million

All the Pretty Horses is a 2000 American Western film produced and directed by Billy Bob Thornton, based on 1992 novel of the same name by Cormac McCarthy. Starring Matt Damon, Henry Thomas, Lucas Black, Penélope Cruz, Rubén Blades, Robert Patrick, Bruce Dern, and Sam Shepard. All the Pretty Horses was the first film adaptation from a Cormac McCarthy novel.

The plot follows young Texas cowboys John Cole and Lacey Rawlins who head to Mexico in search of work, but have misadventures on the way, soon finding themselves in trouble with the law after one of them falls in love with a wealthy rancher's daughter.

The film was released on December 25, 2000, by Miramax Films and Columbia Pictures (through Columbia TriStar Film Distributors International) in other territories to mostly negative reviews. It grossed $18.1 million worldwide on a $57 million budget, making it a box office bomb.

== Plot ==
In 1949, young cowboy John Grady Cole is rendered homeless after his family's ranch is sold. He asks his best friend Lacey Rawlins to leave his family ranch in San Angelo, Texas, and join him to travel on horseback to cross the border 150 miles (241 km) south, to seek work in Mexico. They encounter a peculiar boy named Jimmy Blevins on the trail to Mexico, whom they befriend, but from whom they then separate from.

Later on, the cowboys meet a young aristocrat's daughter, Alejandra Villarreal, with whom Cole falls in love. Cole and Rawlins become hired hands for her father, who likes their work, but Cole's romantic interest in Alejandra is not welcomed by her wealthy aunt. After Alejandra's father takes her away, Cole and Rawlins are arrested by Mexican police and taken to jail.

There they see Blevins, who has been accused of stealing a horse, which was actually his, and of murder. Soon after, he is killed by a corrupt police captain. Cole and Rawlins are sent to a Mexican prison for abetting Blevins's crimes, where they must defend themselves against dangerous inmates. The pair are both nearly killed.

Alejandra's aunt frees Cole and Rawlins, on the condition that Alejandra never sees them again. While Rawlins returns to his parents' ranch in Texas, Cole attempts to reunite with her over her family's objections. Her aunt is confident that Alejandra will keep her word and not get back together with Cole – so much so that she even gives Cole her niece's phone number. He urges Alejandra to come to Texas with him. She, however, decides she must keep her word and though she loves him, cannot go with him.

Cole sets out to get revenge on the captain who took Blevins's life, as well as to get back his, Rawlins's and Blevins's horses. After making the captain his prisoner, he turns him over to a group of Mexican men, including one with whom Cole had previously shared a cell when he jailed them. Cole is spared the decision to kill the captain, but it is implied the men to whom the captain was turned over will.

Returning to the United States and riding through a small town in Texas, stringing the other two horses behind his, he stops to inquire what day it is. After the two men say it is Thanksgiving, he asks the pair if they would be interested in buying a rifle, as he needs the money. One is a sheriff's deputy, so arrests him because all three horses have different brands, therefore suspect Cole is a horse thief.

In court, Cole tells the judge his story from the beginning. The judge believes him and orders Cole freed and the horses returned to him. Later that evening, Cole appears at the judge's home, troubled. The judge had said good things about him in court, but Cole feels guilty that Blevins was killed, although there was nothing he could have done to prevent his death.

Cole is upset with himself for not having spoken up at the time. The judge tells him he is being too hard on himself and it could not have been helped; he must go on and live his life. Cole rides to Rawlins's family's ranch, where he returns his friend's horse.

== Cast ==
- Matt Damon as John Grady Cole
- Henry Thomas as Lacey Rawlins
- Lucas Black as Jimmy Blevins
- Penélope Cruz as Alejandra Villarreal
- Rubén Blades as Don Hector de la Rocha y Villarreal
- Robert Patrick as Cole
- Julio Oscar Mechoso as Captain Raul
- Míriam Colón as Doña Alfonsa
- Bruce Dern as The Judge
- Sam Shepard as J. C. Franklin
- Angelina C. Torres as Luisa
- J. D. Young as Grandfather
- Lonnie Rodriguez as Esteban
- Raul Malo as Singer
- Frederick Lopez as Lieutenant
- Vincente Ramos as Commandante
- J. D. Garfield as Carlos
- Julio C. Cedillo as Campesino
- Marc Miles as Deputy Smith

Additionally, Jesse Plemons had been cast as a younger John Grady Cole, but his scenes were cut.

== Production ==
All the Pretty Horses was filmed in New Mexico and Texas. The production was a partnership between Columbia Pictures and Miramax Films, with Columbia initially handling the film's domestic release and Miramax Films overseeing international distribution. The studios switched distribution roles reportedly, due to Billy Bob Thornton's refusal to cut the film, which was said to have a total runtime of three hours and 40 minutes. With Miramax Films now at the helm of the film's marketing efforts in the United States, studio co-chairman Harvey Weinstein demanded that the film be cut down to under two hours and also put aside the original musical score by Daniel Lanois, having Marty Stuart replace it. The theatrical cut was brought down to one hour and 55 minutes.

In his 2004 book Down and Dirty Pictures, Peter Biskind detailed the troubled post-production process of the film. Matt Damon publicly criticized Weinstein's decision to edit the film, and is quoted by Biskind as saying: "It was like you bake a soufflé and somebody wants you to make it half the size, and you just chop the thing in half and try to mold it and make it look like that was how you made it to begin with. It can't work." Damon added Weinstein "tried to make it look like a love story, so that teenagers would go see it. He made a trailer with me and Penélope Cruz swimming around in the water, skinny-dipping, with Bono singing ... And on the poster, they put, 'Some passions can never be tamed,' which is exactly what the movie's not about. There is no love story, it's about unrequited love, it's about life being bigger than these people and just crushing the passion out of them."

In a 2012 interview with Playboy, Damon reiterated his displeasure with the changes, saying: "Everybody who worked on All the Pretty Horses took so much time and cared so much. As you know, the Cormac McCarthy book is set in 1949 and is about a guy trying to hold on to his old way of life. The electric guitar became popular in 1949, and the composer Daniel Lanois got an old 1949 guitar and wrote this spare, haunting score. We did the movie listening to his score. It informed everything we did. We made this very dark, spare movie, but the studio wanted an epic with big emotions and violins. They saw the cast, the director, Billy Bob Thornton, and the fact that we spent $50 million, and they never released our movie—though the cut still exists. Billy had a heart problem at that time, and it was because his heart fucking broke from fighting for that film. It really fucked him up. It still bothers me to this day."

In 2008, Thornton confirmed his possession of the director's cut on VHS and said it is "two hours and 42 minutes" in length, not over three hours as has been reported. He said he has no intentions of releasing it to the public, despite offers from Miramax Films to release his cut on DVD with Lanois's original score, out of respect for Lanois who owns the rights to the score. Said Thornton, "Dan [Lanois] felt like, 'If my music wasn't good enough for them to put in the movie, then I don't know if I wanna put it in there on the DVD,' so I stood by him. I'm not gonna ever go side against an artist." In 2017, film writer Matt Zoller Seitz shared Thornton had told him the original cut shown to Weinstein was in fact an assembly cut that he had no intention of showing to anyone; however, Weinstein insisted on viewing it and based his editing decisions on what he saw of the cut.

== Critical response ==
Reviews for All the Pretty Horses were generally negative, criticizing it as a poor adaptation of the novel and a dramatically inert film. It holds a 32% score on review aggregator Rotten Tomatoes based on 100 reviews, with an average rating of 5.7/10. The site's consensus states: "This adaptation of Cormac McCarthy's novel comes off as rather flat and uninvolving. Scenes feel rushed and done in shorthand, and the romance between Damon and Cruz has no sparks." On Metacritic, the film holds a weighted average score of 55 out of 100 based on 29 reviews, indicating "mixed or average" reviews. Audiences polled by CinemaScore gave the film an average grade of "C+" on an A+ to F scale.

Entertainment Weekly critic Lisa Schwarzbaum said: "Faced with a choice of blunt instruments with which to beat a good book into a bad movie, director Billy Bob Thornton chooses heavy, random, arty imagery and a leaden pace." She also criticized the film's narrative incoherence, writing, "The trail from one plot advance to the next is so badly mapped as to leave anyone unfamiliar with the novel back in the dust." Schwarzbaum concluded, "Perhaps Thornton didn't know what he wanted from scene to scene and where he wanted to arrive at in the end, or perhaps too many cooks stuck their spoons in the gazpacho in the course of cooking up this 'prestige picture.'" The New York Times critic A. O. Scott thought the film "as slick and superficial as a Marlboro advertisement".

Roger Ebert disagreed, awarding the film three-and-a-half stars out of a possible four.

=== Awards ===
Wins

- Best Screenplay – National Board of Review (Ted Tally)

Nominations

- Best Original Score – Golden Globes (Marty Stuart, Kristin Wilkinson, and Larry Paxton)
- USC Scripter Award – Ted Tally
- Grand Prix – Paris Film Festival (Billy Bob Thornton)
- Best Supporting Actor – Young Artist Awards (Lucas Black)

== See also ==
- List of films about horses
