= Kent L. Wakeford =

American cinematographer (1928–2020)

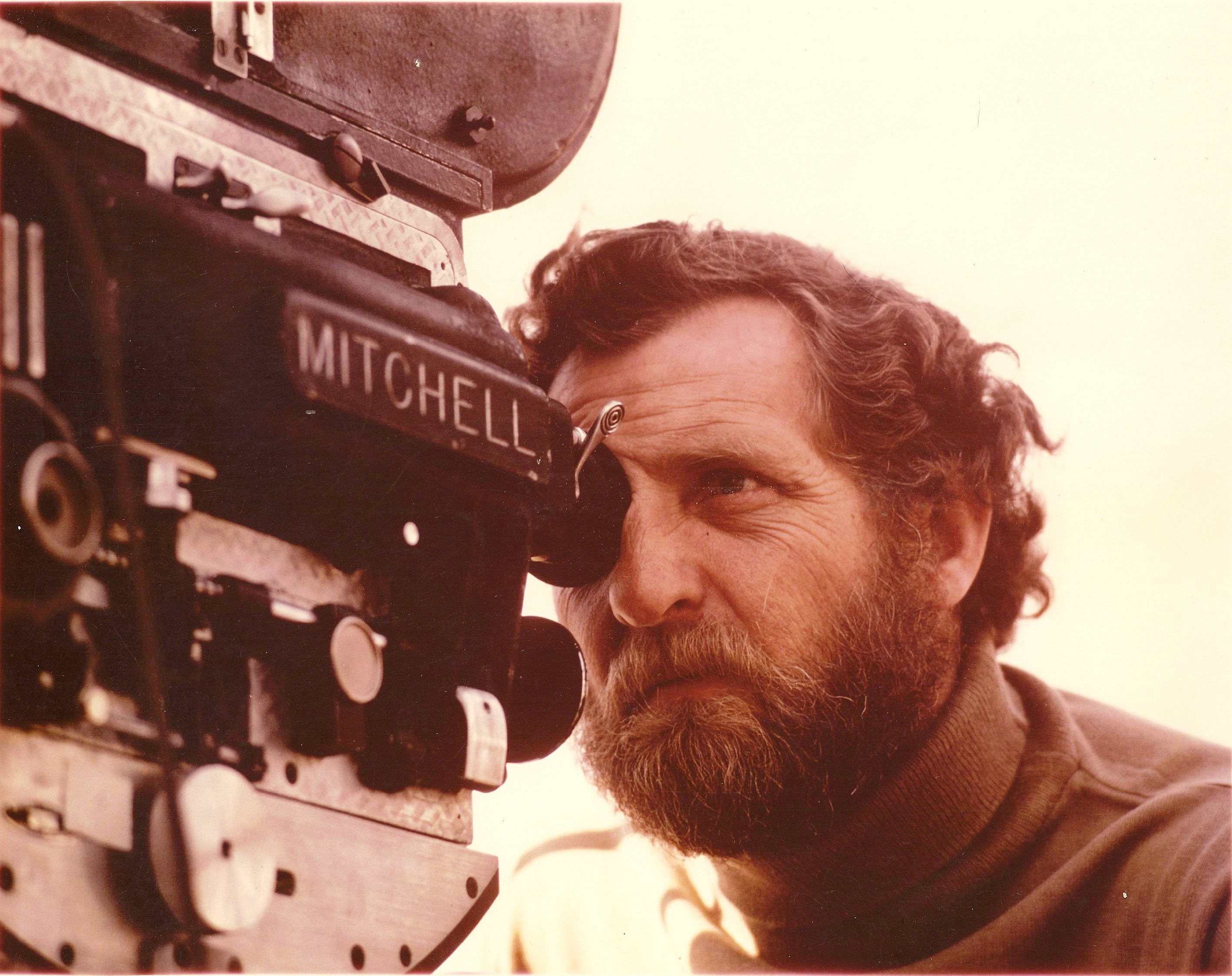
- Born: Kent Lon Wakeford; January 23, 1928; Los Angeles, California, U.S.
- Died: October 10, 2020 (aged 92); Calabasas, California, U.S.
- Occupations: Cinematographer, television commercial producer
- Years active: 1965–1998

Kent Lon Wakeford (January 23, 1928 – October 10, 2020) was an American cinematographer, the co-founder of Wakeford / Orloff Productions, and founder of Kent Wakeford and Associates, two commercial production companies.

Wakeford was most known for working on Martin Scorsese's films Mean Streets and Alice Doesn't Live Here Anymore as well as on the films China O'Brien, Some Folks Call It a Sling Blade and Wedding Bell Blues.

== Early life and career ==
Wakeford was born in 1928 and grew up in south Los Angeles. While finishing high school, Wakeford apprenticed with fashion photographer Earl Scott. Following his apprenticeship, Wakeford landed a job as a cameraman at The Douglas Aircraft Company, where he was responsible for filming new missiles, planes, and classified weapons tests at White Sands, New Mexico and Edwards Air Force Base becoming one of the early experts in super high speed cinema (5,000 to 8,000 frames per second). Wakeford's work at The Douglas Aircraft Company led him to the United States Army where he spent two years in the Signal Corp. as a motion picture cameraman in New York City and Germany.

Following his time in the Army, Wakeford began shooting documentary films. One of his early documentary films was on Wernher von Braun whom Wakeford had met and developed a relationship with at Douglas Aircraft. He advanced his documentary career by shooting films with Willard Van Dyke, a leading social documentary filmmaker who later went on to be director of the Department of Film at the Museum of Modern Art.

== Advertising career ==
To supplement his documentary work, Wakeford began freelancing on commercial projects. One of his first jobs was as a cameraman for Danger Is My Business, a reality show that traveled around California filming dangerous professions. During this time, he also created art films, including Fish which explored movement of color in synch to music and won an award at the Edinburgh International Film Festival.

Later Wakeford began shooting live action that would be incorporated into animation. Wakeford quickly began working for animators in Hollywood including Jose Cuauhtemoc "Bill" Malendez (Peanuts), and Hanna & Barbera. With this success, Wakeford started a commercial production company with John Orloff named Wakeford / Orloff Productions. Wakeford/Orloff Productions shot national commercials for brands including Budweiser, Mattel, Hot Wheels, Barbie, Boeing, Purina, Post Cereal, Chevrolet, United Airlines, Maybelline, Max Factor, Procter & Gamble, Rice-a-Roni, Gallo wine, Kellogg's, and McDonald's.

== Film career ==
Wakeford's first major motion picture was Mean Streets (1973) directed by Martin Scorsese and starring Harvey Keitel and Robert De Niro. Wakeford shot the film using handheld camera techniques to capture the self-destructive lives of shady characters in Little Italy New York. The Huffington Post called the cinematography by Wakeford "arguably the most original for this genre at the time and has been copied endlessly in other movies, down to his audacious tracking shots. The innovative handholding and lighting techniques used by Wakeford have since become mainstream practice in American cinema." In 1997, the United States National Film Registry elected to preserve Mean Streets for being "culturally, historically, or aesthetically significant."

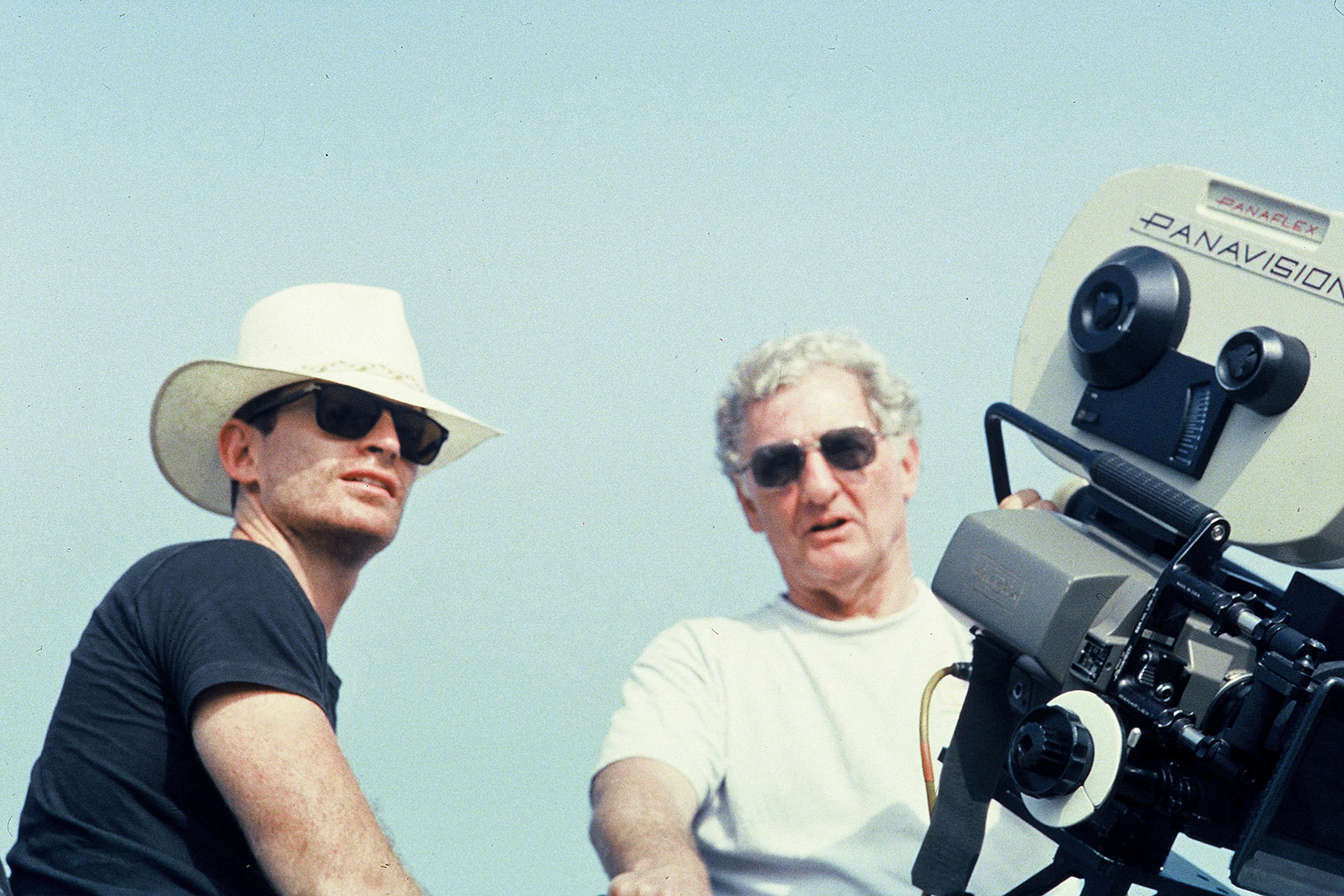
Wakeford (right) on set with director Joel Hershman on Hold Me, Thrill Me, Kiss Me in 1992.

Wakeford went on to shoot Alice Doesn’t Live Here Anymore (1974), directed by Martin Scorsese and starring Ellen Burstyn and Kris Kristofferson. The National Board of Review of Motion Pictures called Wakeford's cinematography "inventive." The film won the Academy Award for Best Actress (Ellen Burstyn) and was nominated for an Academy Award for Best Actress in a Supporting Role for Diane Ladd and Best Original Screenplay for Robert Getchell.

Wakeford later transitioned back into commercial work by starting production company Kent Wakeford & Associates.

He later spent a season shooting the television show L.A. Law. However, after 14 episodes he turned his attention to small independent films and shot over a dozen independent films over the next decade. Most of the films were action oriented using his gritty street-like sensibility from Mean Streets. He also shot short films such as the "This Ain't Bebop" segment of Imagining America, directed by Ralph Bakshi and starring Harvey Keitel and Ron Thompson.

== Death ==
Wakeford died at the Wasserman Campus of the Motion Picture & Television Fund on October 10, 2020, at the age of 92.

== Filmography ==
- Mean Streets (1973)
- Doctor Death: Seeker of Souls (1973)
- Black Belt Jones (1973)
- Alice Doesn't Live Here Anymore (1974)
- The Princess Academy (1987)
- The Women's Club (1987)
- L.A. Law (1987–1988)
- This Ain't Bebop (1989)
- China O'Brien (1990)
- China O'Brien II (1990)
- The Last Hour (1991)
- Total Exposure (1991)
- Night Eyes II (1991)
- Hold Me, Thrill Me, Kiss Me (1992)
- Ironheart (1992)
- Grey Knight (1992)
- Love, Cheat & Steal (1993)
- Some Folks Call It a Sling Blade (1994)
- Frame-Up II: The Cover-Up (1994)
- Loser (1994)
- Boy Crazy, Girl Crazier (1996)
- Power 98 (1996)
- Wedding Bell Blues (1996)
- Last Lives (1996)
- Waking Up Horton (1997)
- Halfway Home (1998)
