= Hold Me, Thrill Me, Kiss Me (film) =

- Theatrical release poster
- Directed by: Joel Hershman
- Written by: Joel Hershman
- Produced by: Travis Swords
- Starring: Adrienne Shelly; Timothy Leary; Sean Young; Max Parrish; Diane Ladd; Andrea Naschak
- Cinematography: Kent L. Wakeford
- Edited by: Kathryn Himoff
- Music by: Gerald Gouriet
- Distributed by: October Films; Mad Dog Pictures
- Release date: May 1992
- Running time: 92 minutes
- Country: United States
- Language: English

Hold Me, Thrill Me, Kiss Me is a 1992 American comedy film starring Adrienne Shelly, Max Parrish, Andrea Naschak, and written and directed by Joel Hershman. Supporting roles are played by Diane Ladd, Sean Young, and Timothy Leary.

A raunchy screwball comedy with a romantic subplot, Hold Me follows a small-time criminal hiding from his ex-fiancée and the law in an El Monte, California trailer park, where the production was filmed. While there he meets an assortment of oddball characters, and finds himself juggling the affections of two sisters, a sadistic porn star and a demure virgin.

According to The Austin Chronicle, "The strong points of Hershman's film are his wonderfully wacky story in combination with a terrific, top-notch cast whose performances easily render credible, slice-of-life images of life in the lower-class lane." Despite largely positive reviews, some of which went so far as to compare Hershman to John Waters and Paul Bartel, the film failed to break even at the box office. As of 2013, distribution for the film is handled by Farwest Enterprises, Inc.

== Plot ==
When small-time criminal Eli (Max Parrish) accidentally shoots his heiress fiancée (Sean Young) in a forced shot-gun wedding, he flees with her fortune. He winds up in a trailer park in El Monte, California. While waiting for fake ID from a shady criminal (Timothy Leary), he meets an assortment of oddball characters at the trailer-park. There's Sabra (Andrea Naschak) a sadistic porno star who collects Barbie dolls; her virginal younger sister Diana (Adrienne Shelly); Olga (Ania Suli) a washed out Hungarian opera singer/actress; her foul-mouthed son Laszlo (Bella Lehcozky), and two aging southern belles (Diane Ladd and her real life mother) who lust after Eli. After Sabra seduces Bud (Eli's new alias), his real problems begin. Sabra wants him for herself, but he's just interested in her sister.

== Cast ==
=== Characters ===
- Max Parrish as Eli/Bud/Fritz (protagonist)
- Adrienne Shelly as Dannie (virginal love interest)
- Andrea Naschak as Sabra (stripper)
- Sean Young as Twinkle (dominating heiress)
- Diane Ladd as Lucille (Southern belle)
- Ania Suli as Olga (washed up Opera singer)
- Bela Lehoczky as Laszlo (Olga's son)
- Timothy Leary as Mr. Jones (criminal)
- Joseph Anthony Richards as Duane
- Vic Trevino as Julio

=== Gallery ===
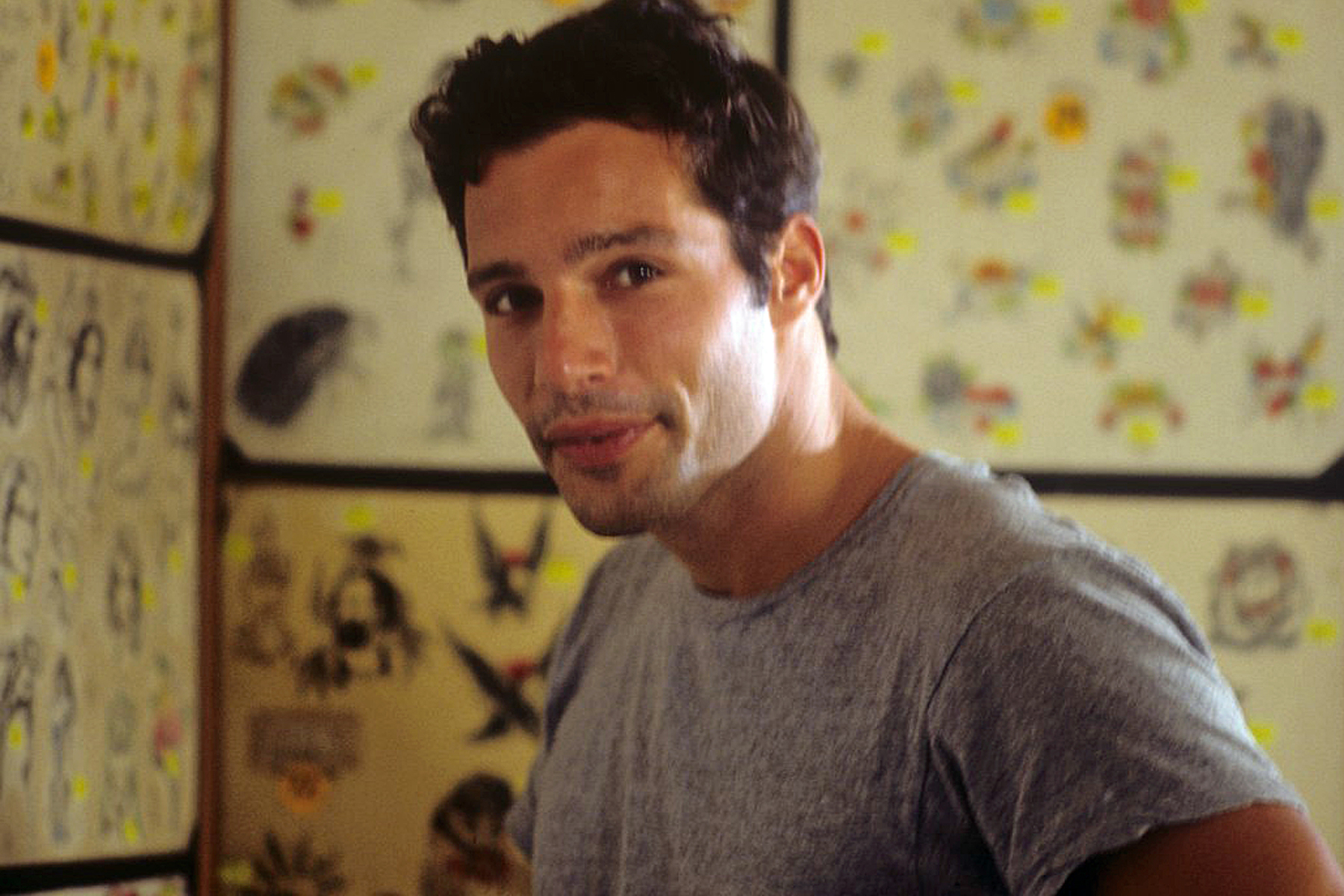
Hold Me marked Max Parrish's first film (pictured on set)

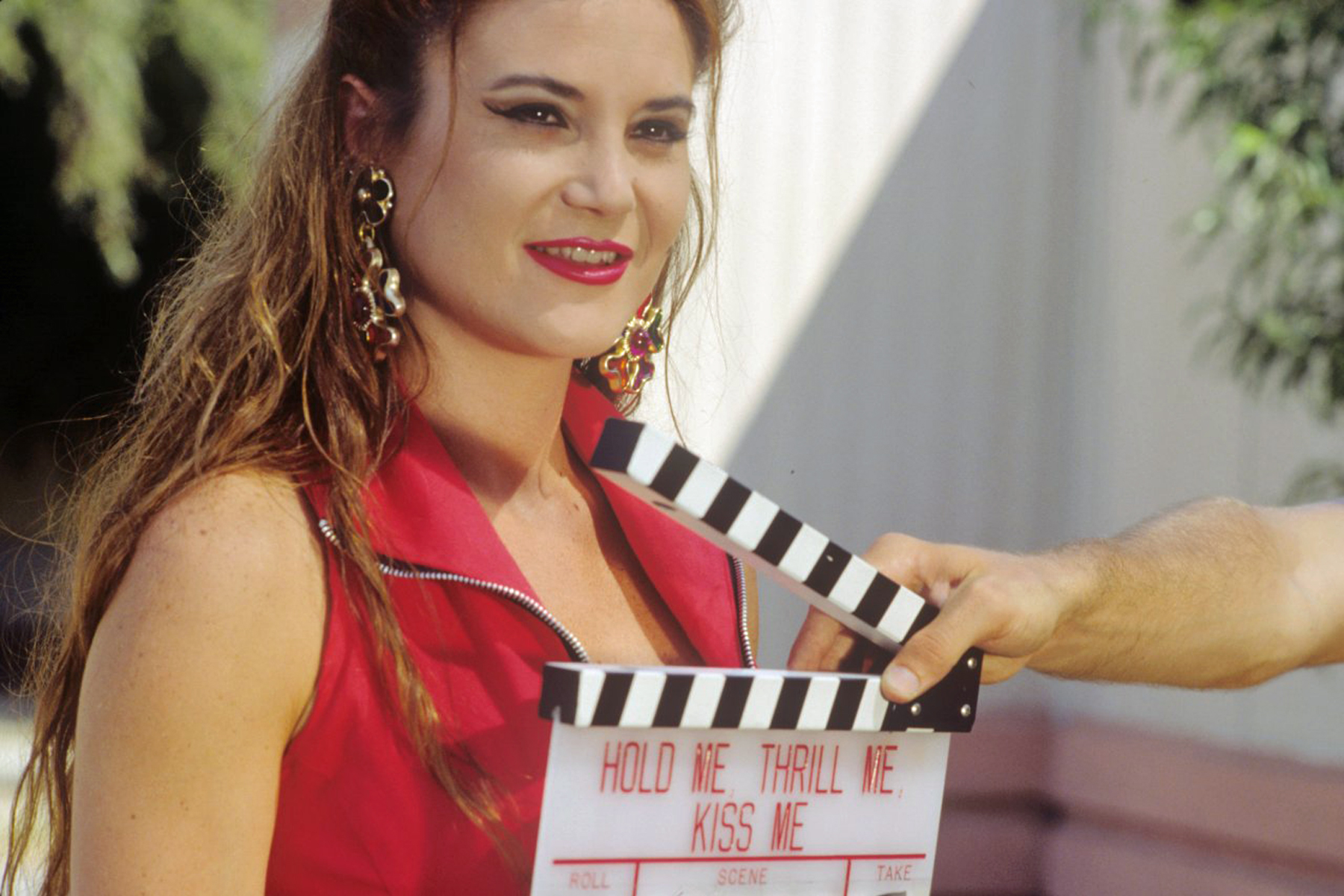
Andrea Naschak (on set as Sabra) was a veteran of both Shakespearean acting and adult films

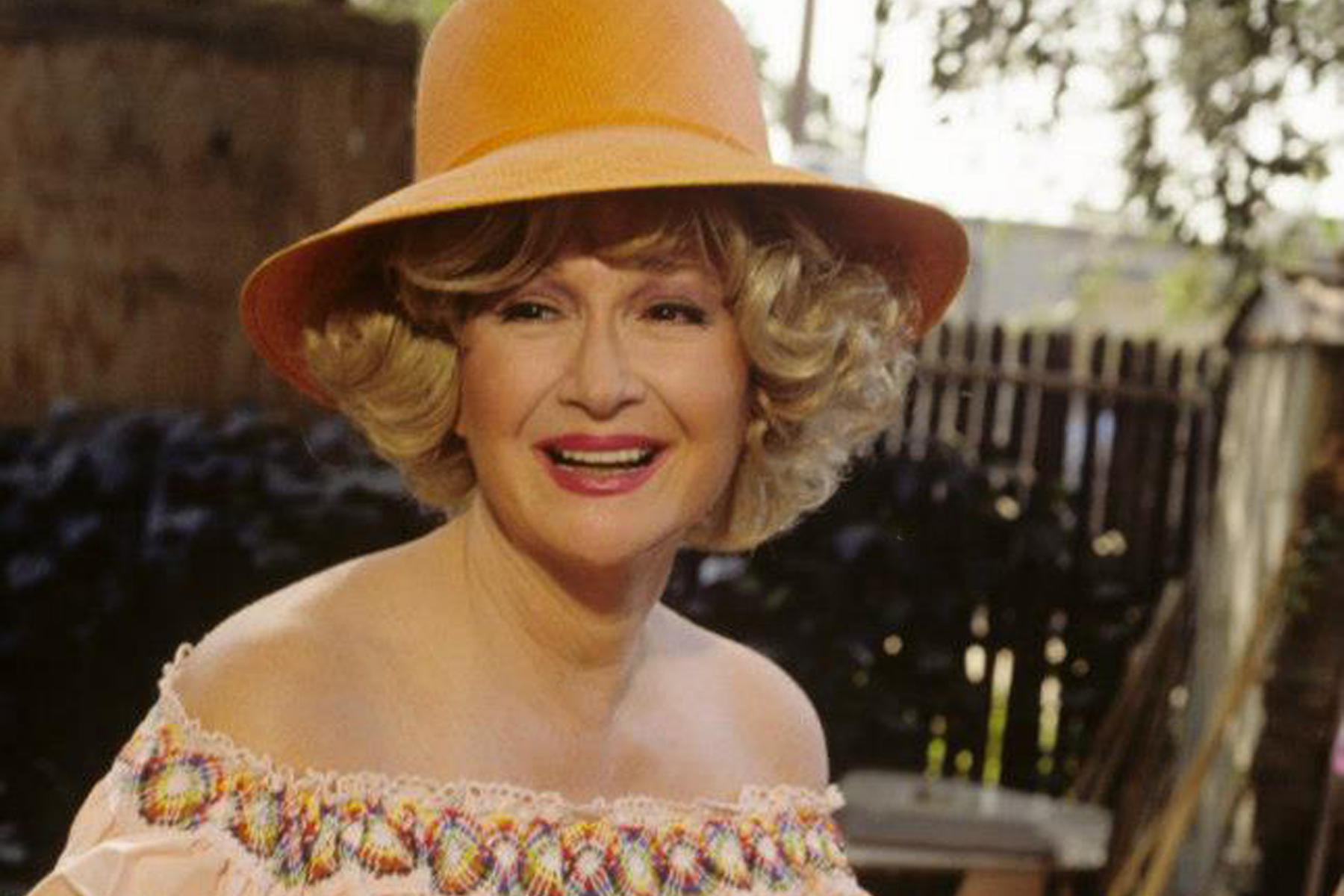
Golden Globe winner Diane Ladd (pictured as Lucille) played the character as a tongue-in-cheek spoof of herself

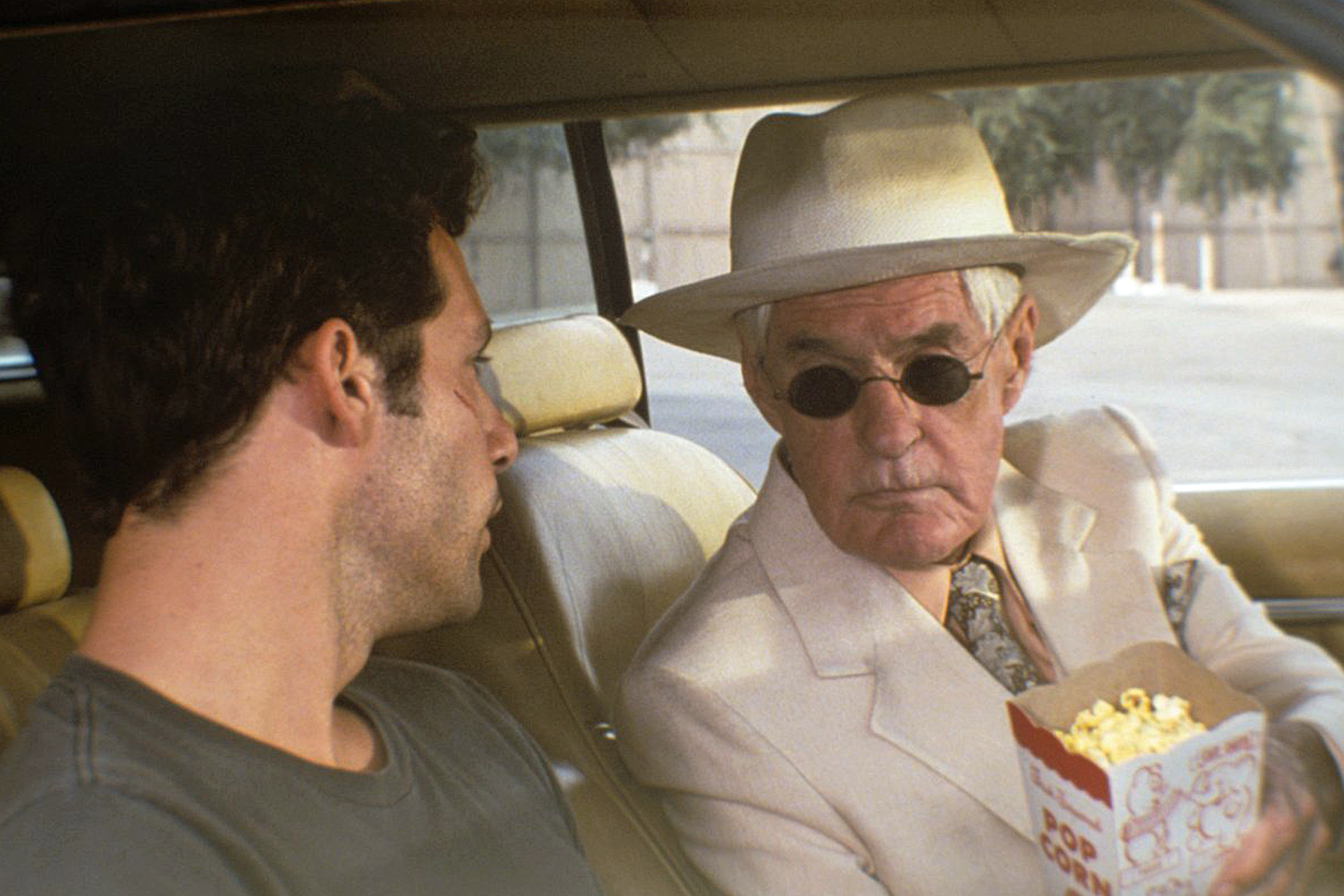
Cultural icon Timothy Leary (pictured in the film) had a supporting role

== Production ==
=== Filming ===
Pre-production

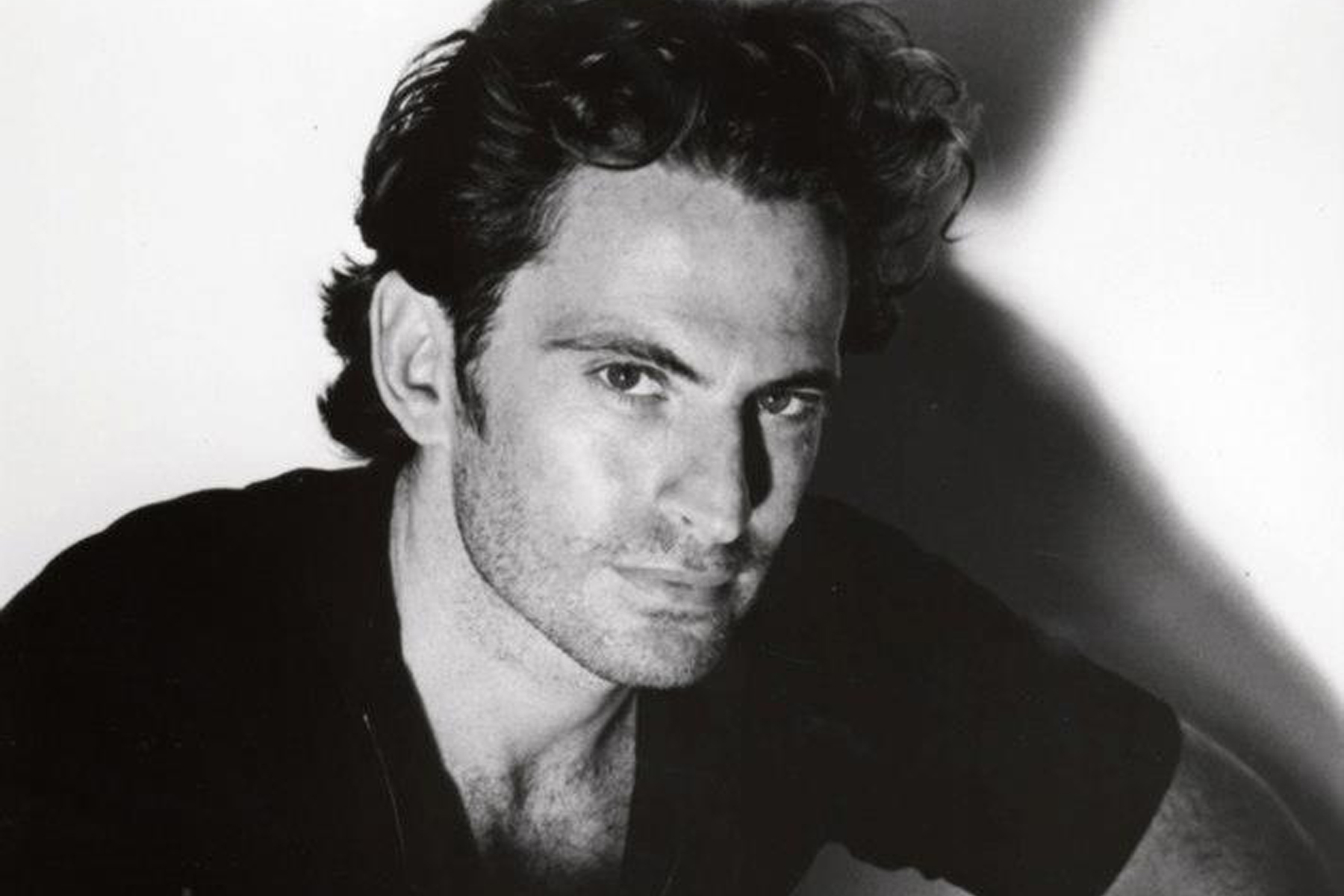
Actor headshot of director Joel Hershman, who also created the scenario and wrote the script

The concept and script for the film were created by first-time director Joel Hershman in 1991, whose background was as an actor. Hershman wrote the script in only ten days. Producers Travis Swords, Martin Ira Rubin, Bela Lehoczky, and Alain Silver soon came on board, and the production company Thrill Me Productions was created for the film. J B & Associates Inc. also had a production credit.

"[Actress] Sean Young rented her own limo and her own jet for the picture. We didn't pay for it because we couldn't afford to pay for it. She gave herself the star treatment. The first day that she worked, she was willing to jump in and wrestle with [actor Max Parrish] and roll around the ground. She's about giving a performance."
— Producer Alain Joel Silver

Casting

Casting was handled by Doreen Lane, and included both professional and non-professional actors. Sean Young had previously starred in Blade Runner, for example, while Max Parrish, the lead protagonist, was a first-time actor.

The role of Sabra, the nymphomaniacal stripper who takes in Eli, was played by Andrea Naschak, a one-time child actress who moved on to Shakespeare festivals, and who had spent 1990 to 1992 as adult film star April Rayne.

There are two real mother-child actor duos in the movie; Diane Ladd and her real-life mother, Mary Lanier, and Ania Suli and her real-life son Bela Lehoczky, also a producer. According to the Los Angeles Times, "the elegant Suli, like her character in the movie, was a prewar star of films and opera in her native Hungary." John Auxier, a real-life inhabitant of the trailer park where the film was shot, acted as the son of Diane Ladd's character.

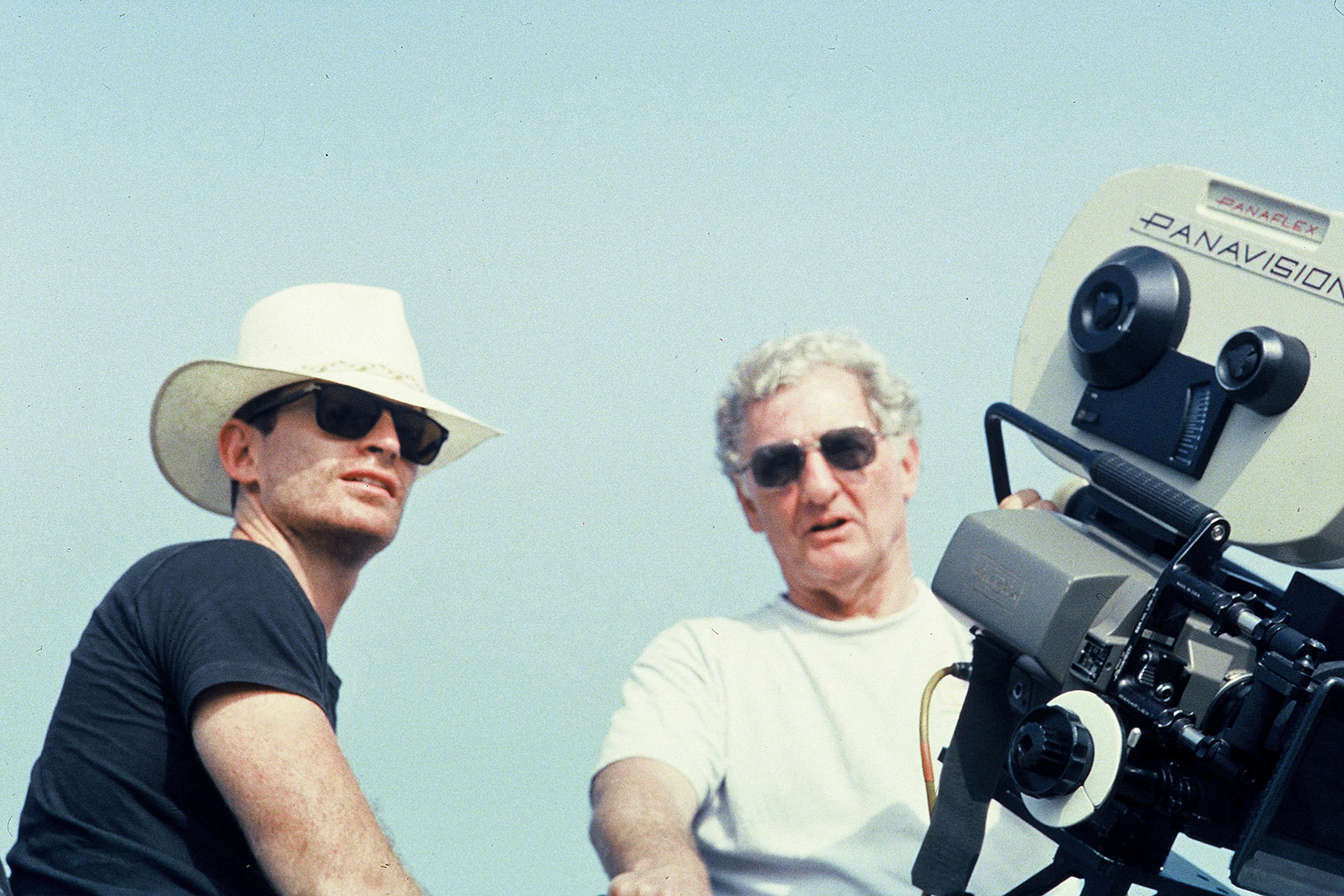
Hershman and cinematographer Kent L. Wakeford on set in Los Angeles

Shooting

Filming took place in Los Angeles, California and El Monte, California in just 18 days. According to producer Alain Silver, the production partly went so quickly because cinematographer Kent L. Wakeford used digital video instead of film stock. With a budget "significantly under one million dollars," Sean Young contributed props of her own to the production, and Diane Ladd and Timothy Leary were both on set for one day each.

Costumes and costume design were handled by Cathy Cooper, with help from actress Sean Young. According to a review, "This film is shot in the colors of sleaze--from Sabra's day-glow spandex to the hues of the trailer court. Everything is there to enhance the camp." The film was edited by Kathrym Imhoff.

=== Soundtrack ===
The original music was handled by Gerald Gouriet, who had previously been nominated for Golden Globe Award for Best Original Score for his work on Madame Sousatzka (1988). Other tracks came from a number of indie rock bands such as Violent Femmes and The Pixies.

No.	Title	Writer(s)	Length
1.	"Girl Trouble"	Violent Femmes
2.	"Dickweed"	Elvis Hitler
3.	"Monster"	Fred Schneider
4.	"Where Is My Mind"	The Pixies
5.	"Dames, Booze, Chains, and Boots"	The Cramps
6.	"Always Today"	The Honey Buzzards
7.	"My Heart Is A Flower"	King Missile
8.	"Don’t Push Me"	Elvis Hitler
9.	"She’s On Drugs"	The Jazz Butcher
10.	"I’m Free"	Violent Femmes
11.	"Hold Me Thrill Me Kiss Me"	Mel Carter
12.	"U Li La Lu"	Poi Dog Pondering
13.	"Rue Des Tempetes"	The Young Gods
14.	"La La Love You"	The Pixies

== Release, distribution ==
"Hold Me, Thrill Me, Kiss Me typifies the best you can hope for [at the box office] if you do a really quirky picture with a few names scattered here and there. Unfortunately, the best you can hope for in that type of picture is far short of a return on your investment."
— producer Alain Silver

Original release poster

The film was released in theaters in the United States on July 30, 1993. The domestic theatrical distributor was Mad Dog Films/October Films, and it was distributed in Canada by Cineplex Odeon as well as at various film festivals. It was released in foreign theaters by Films Number One, and foreign sales were handled by August Entertainment Inc. On January 26, 1994, about seven months later, it was released domestically on VHS through LIVE Home Video and around the same time in Canada by Cineplex Odeon Video and MCA Home Video.

Despite strong reviews, it came short of breaking even at the box office. After the release, the director received a development deal from Warner Brothers to turn it into a series, but it never came to fruition. Alain Joel Silver quoted casting problems, partly stemming from the low budget.

In 2013, American Laundromat Records announced via social media that they would be distributing the film on DVD and VOD (video on demand). The distributor was later revealed to be Farwest Enterprises, Inc.

== Reception ==
Early reviews as the film entered the festival circuit were largely positive. TV Guide gave it 3/4 stars, The Austin Chronicle 3.5/5 stars.

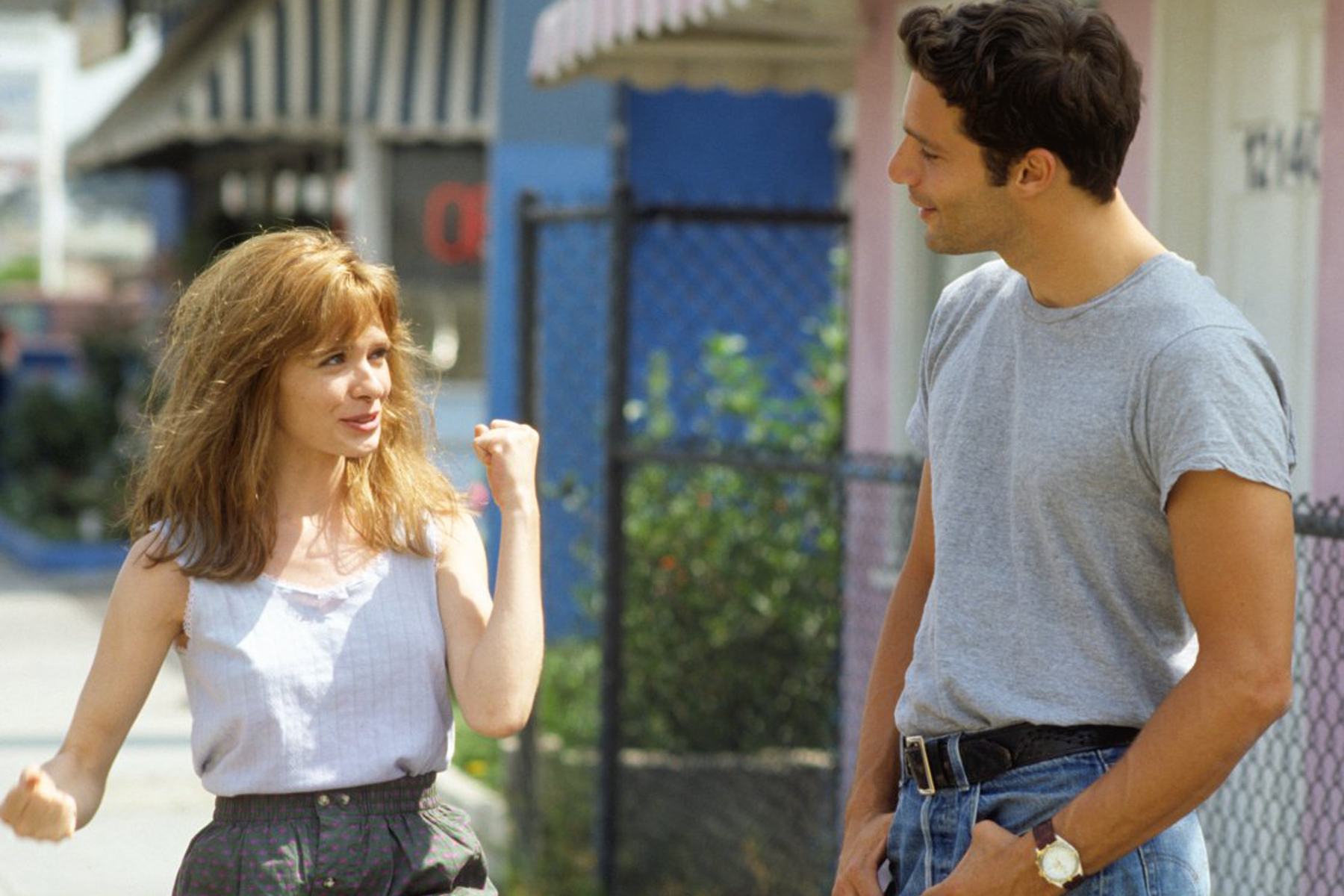
The romance between the characters played by Adrienne Shelly and Max Parrish (pictured on set) was praised by the Los Angeles Times

Reviews for the story and plotline were mixed. While The Washington Post called it a "crude and unimaginative parody of drive-in movie fare," The Austin Chronicle gave the film glowing praise, going so far as to write "Move over, John Waters and Paul Bartel. There's a new, fresh auteur on the guilty pleasure/psychotronic/cult film block. Hershman...manages to turn out a hilariously trashy, raunchy, dark, and thoroughly entertaining film that is uniquely his own. The strong points of Hershman's film are his wonderfully wacky story in combination with a terrific, top-notch cast whose performances easily render credible, slice-of-life images of life in the lower-class lane."

The Los Angeles Times praised the acting performances, in particular the roles of the newcomers, and said the film works best as a romance, as "both Parrish, in his film debut, and Shelley are highly appealing actors."

About specific roles, "It's no eye-opener when Diane Ladd hints at a touching neediness beneath Lucille's frilly flirting, or when Adrienne Shelly...makes far more of her half of the Madonna/whore sibling duo than the role's outlines would suggest. But Andrea Naschak, well known to pornographic movie fans as April Rayne, is surprising as Sabra; broadly drawn though she is, she's a convincing character. Hunky newcomer Max Parrish projects an apparently effortless charm that eludes many more seasoned performers."

A separate review stated "For all the garishness of the setting, in which tackiness reigns supreme, Hold Me largely avoids the gross characterizations that often mar self-consciously hip movies; the residents of the El Monte trailer park all reveal quirks and facets that give them a life beyond pure caricature."

== Legacy ==
Hershman went on to co-author several studio screenplays, and later wrote and directed Greenfingers in 2000. Composer Gerald Gouriet afterwards worked on films such as Timescape (1992) and They (1993).

Leading actress Adrienne Shelley went on to lead an accomplished career as both an actress and writer-director, while Max Parrish went on to act in a number of TV shows, culminating in the 2002 film The Story of O: Untold Pleasures, an adaption of the French novel Story of O. Andrea Naschak moved to the San Francisco Bay Area, married, and began raising a son.
