= Alice Hyatt =

Fictional character

Alice Hyatt (born Alice Graham in the movie; Alice Spivak in the television series) is a fictional character in the movie Alice Doesn't Live Here Anymore and in the subsequent television series Alice. In the movie, she was played by Ellen Burstyn, who won an Academy Award for the role. In the television series, Alice was played by actress and singer Linda Lavin.

== Character biography ==
=== 1974 film ===
Alice was born and raised in Monterey, California. While still young, she marries truck driver Donald Hyatt (Billy Green Bush), who does not want his wife to pursue her dream career as a nightclub singer. With that she moves to his home town of Socorro, New Mexico, where she is a stay-at-home housewife who constantly tries to please her husband, who is miserable. They have a son, Tommy (Alfred Lutter). Some time later, Don dies in a trucking accident. Now a widow with a 12-year-old son to care for, she sets off for Monterey, California, but she stops in Phoenix, Arizona, to find a job to make money to get to Monterey, as they have only $90 to survive on. She rents a motel with a kitchen, and finds a job as a singer at a piano bar, where she meets a charming younger man named Ben (Harvey Keitel). They date until Alice finds out that Ben is married. When she tries to break off her relationship with him, he threatens to kill her. Frightened, she and Tommy flee to Tucson, Arizona, where she finds a job as a waitress at a greasy spoon called Mel's Diner, run by Mel Sharples (Vic Tayback).

Alice struggles with her new job at first, but eventually gets the hang of it with help from the cynical head waitress, Florence Jean "Flo" Castleberry (Diane Ladd). Alice also meets a local divorced farmer named David (Kris Kristofferson), and they fall in love. They nearly break up when they get into an argument over their future together and over disciplining Tommy, but David ultimately says he loves her and Tommy and wants to spend the rest of his life taking care of them. Alice decides to stay in Tucson with David, after making sure it is all right with Tommy.
