= Hayley Hasselhoff =

American actress and model (born 1992)

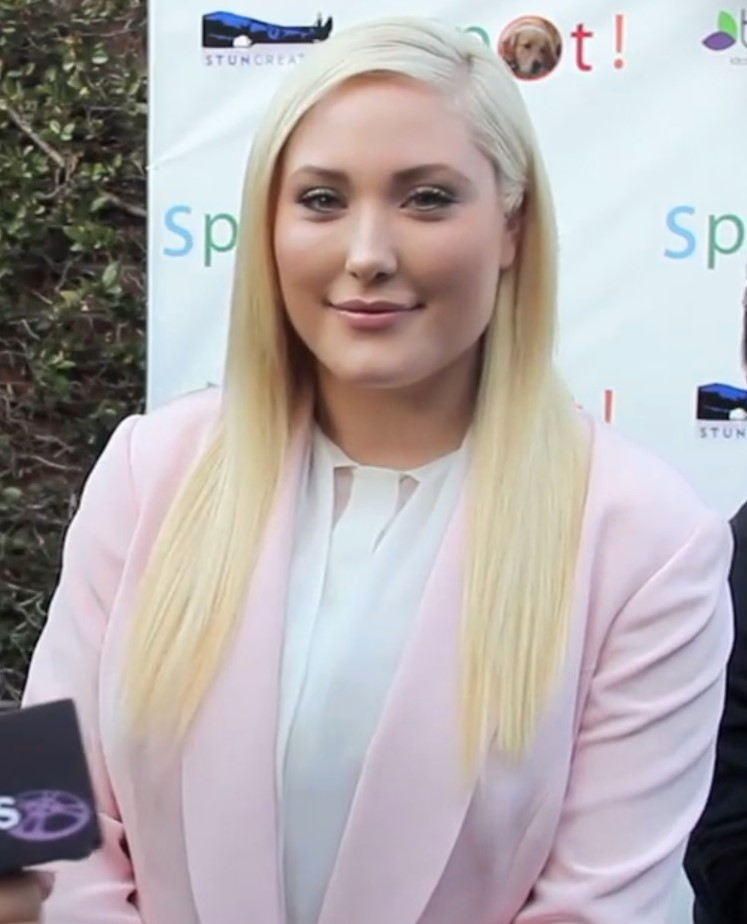
- Hasselhoff in 2014
- Born: Hayley Amber Hasselhoff; August 26, 1992 (age 34); Los Angeles, California, U.S.
- Occupations: Actress, model
- Parent(s): David Hasselhoff; Pamela Bach
- Modeling information
- Height: 5 ft 7 in (1.70 m)
- Hair color: Brunette
- Eye color: Green

Hayley Amber Hasselhoff (born August 26, 1992) is an American actress and plus-size model. She is known for her role as Amber in the ABC Family original series Huge. She is the daughter of David Hasselhoff and Pamela Bach. Hasselhoff starred in the short-lived 2010 A&E reality series The Hasselhoffs. She also starred in Celebrity Showmance.

== Early life ==
Hasselhoff was born on August 26, 1992, in Los Angeles, California, to parents David Hasselhoff and Pamela Bach (née Weissenbach, 1962–2025). She has an older sister, Taylor.

== Career ==
Hasselhoff started acting in 1999 when she appeared in her father's TV series Baywatch. She has also starred in the reality television series The Hasselhoffs and in 2010 she played Amber in Huge for 10 episodes.

Hasselhoff has also been modeling as a plus-size model since 2007 when she was 14. She is considered a "plus-size model" as she is a size 14. She has been signed with Wilhelmina Models and as of 2014, is signed with Ford Models. She has walked in shows such as the 2014 British Plus Size Fashion Week, and has modeled for Torrid. She has also been named the ambassador for Pulp Fashion Week in Paris. In October 2019, she began competing in The X Factor: Celebrity. She was eliminated at the audition stage. In April 2021, Hasselhoff became the first plus-size model to pose for the cover of the German edition of Playboy.

== Filmography ==
=== Film ===
Year	Title	Role	Notes
2002	More than Puppy Love	Little Girl With Dog	
2016	Sharknado: The 4th Awakens	Supervisor Mary Jane	

=== Television ===
Year	Title	Role	Notes
1999, 2000	Baywatch	Tammi, Younger girl on the USS Missouri	2 episodes: "Castles in the Sand", "Last Rescue"
2010	Huge	Amber	10 episodes
2010	The Hasselhoffs	Herself	2 episodes
2012	Pair of Kings	Sasha	2 episodes
2016	Top Model Curves	Herself	2 episodes
2017	Fear Factor	Herself	
2018	Curvy Girls Stripped Bare	Herself	
2019	Celebrity Coach Trip	Herself	
2019	The X Factor: Celebrity	Herself	
2019	Why Women Kill	Penny Jenkins	1 episode
