= The Honey Buzzards =

English rock band

The Honey Buzzards were a Norwich, England based band who achieved significant independent music success in the early 1990s. The band split in 1994. They achieved critical acclaim in The NME and Melody Maker, and shared a BBC Session studio with David Bowie.

== Career ==
They were formed by Ian Thompson (born 1971, vocals/guitar), Simon Shaw (born 1972, bass) and Matthew Wayne (born 1971, drums) at Norwich School in 1988. In 1991 they were joined by Nate Ingram (born 1970) and John Evans (born 1972) as guitarists, a lineup which was to become their most settled. They took their name from a 17th-century British painting. Their sound was influenced by an art school sensibility, The Velvet Underground, Lloyd Cole and the Commotions and latterly The Stone Roses.

They released two singles on Manchester-based Sheer Joy Records, "Sympathy (For Two Girls)" (1991) and "Starhappy" (1992), both of which made the Top 20 of the UK Indie Chart, and issued a promo single with remixes by The Orb. The track "Pale Horse" graced the indie cassette compilation Under Wild East Anglian Skies while "Did you Fall?" featured on The Waterfront Compilation #1. Their strongest sales were in Scandinavia, particularly Sweden. 15 years after the band split, the single "Starhappy" was touted by Cloudberry as an indie classic.

Their first single was produced by Michael Johnson, who was responsible for much of New Order's back catalogue, including the Brotherhood, Low-life and Technique albums. In 1991, the band recorded two BBC Sessions, one for the 'Mark Goodier Evening Session' (BBC Radio 1) and one for 'Hit the North' (BBC Radio 5). Meanwhile, John Peel championed the band's singles extensively.

They also appeared on the soundtrack to the Diane Ladd and Max Parrish film, Hold Me, Thrill Me, Kiss Me (1993).

John Evans has gone on to achieve mainstream national success with the band The Divine Comedy and continues to tour as their guitarist.

The band supported Norwich City F.C., with the exception of John Evans who follows Wrexham F.C.
