= Power 98 =

Power 98 may refer to:

- Power 98 (radio station), an English radio station in Singapore
- Power 98 (film), a 1996 film starring Eric Roberts about a Los Angeles talk radio station
- "Power 98", official nickname of radio station WPEG, in Charlotte, North Carolina, United States
