= Pamela Bach =

American actress (1962–2025)

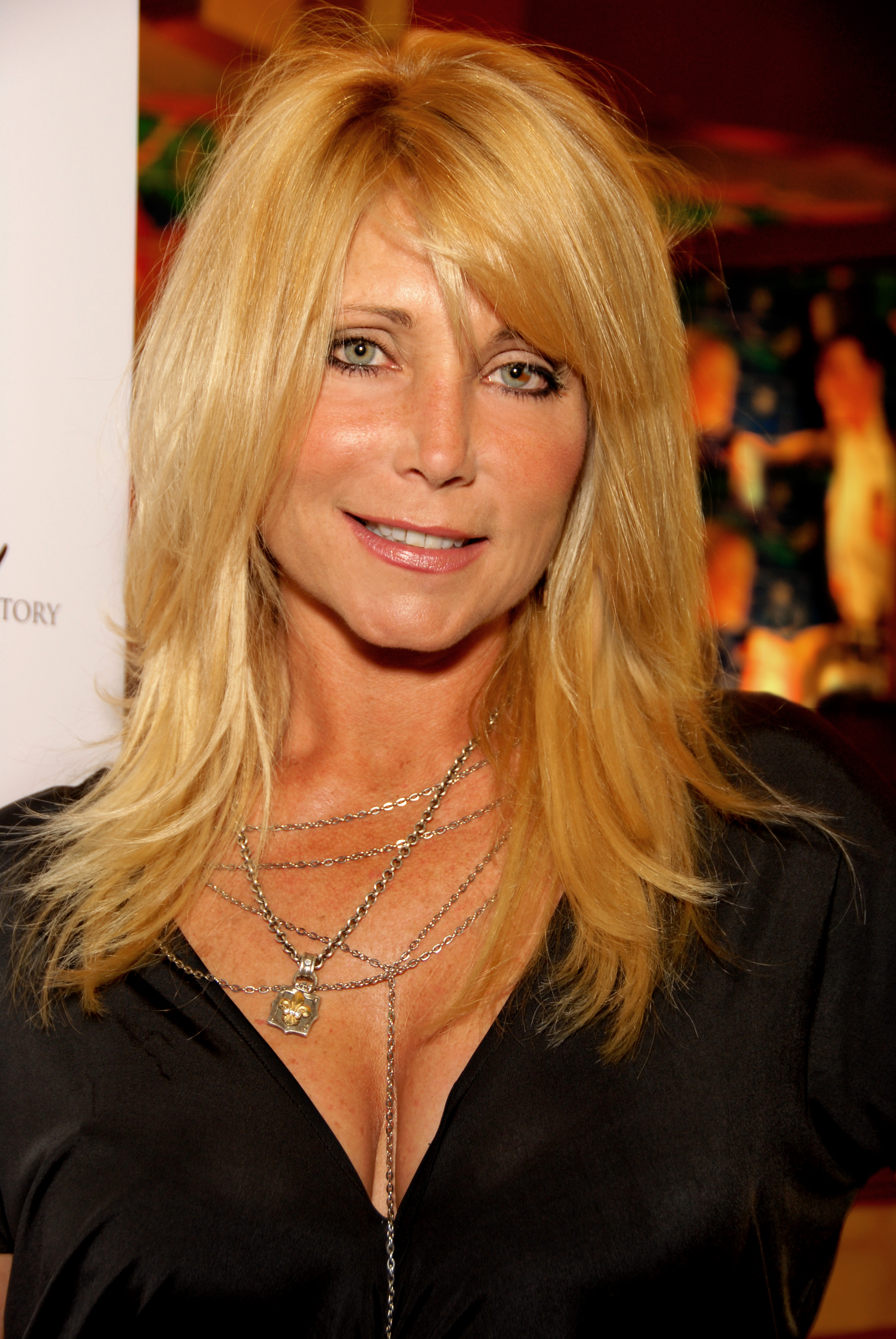
- Bach in 2009
- Born: Pamela Weissenbach; October 16, 1962 (Note: While some sources during Bach's life indicated a birth date of October 16, 1963, the Los Angeles Times gave her birth date as October 16, 1962, in an obituary, and several sources reporting her death listed her age as 62, matching the earlier birthdate. Similarly, a January 1989 newspaper profile gave her age as 26.); Tulsa, Oklahoma, U.S.
- Died: March 5, 2025 (aged 62); Los Angeles, California, U.S.
- Education: Northeastern Oklahoma A&M College
- Occupation: Actress
- Years active: 1983–2011
- Spouse: David Hasselhoff (m. 1989; div. 2006)
- Children: 2, including Hayley Hasselhoff

Pamela Bach (née Weissenbach; October 16, 1962 – March 5, 2025), also known as Pamela Bach-Hasselhoff, was an American actress.

== Early life ==
Bach was from Tulsa, Oklahoma, the second of three daughters. Her mother was a model, and she also modeled as a teenager. She attended Tulsa East Central High School and studied Engineering/Theatre Arts at Northeastern Oklahoma A&M College. She moved to Los Angeles in 1985.

== Career ==
Bach worked together with her husband on the long-running series Baywatch and she had a recurring role as a psychologist in the series Sirens. In August 2011, she was a housemate on the eighth series of Celebrity Big Brother in the United Kingdom. She became the second celebrity to be evicted from the house on Day 14, finishing in ninth place.

== Personal life and death ==
Bach met David Hasselhoff on the set of the Knight Rider episode "Knight Racer" in 1985. They married in December 1989. The couple had two daughters: Taylor Ann Hasselhoff, born May 5, 1990, who attended the University of Arizona and was cast for the 2015 season of Rich Kids of Beverly Hills, and actress Hayley Hasselhoff, born August 26, 1992. In January 2006, Hasselhoff announced he was filing for divorce, citing irreconcilable differences. Their divorce was finalized in August 2006. Bach was given custody of one daughter and Hasselhoff custody of the other. Both appeared on the CBS daytime drama The Young and the Restless, though not at the same time: Pamela as Mari Jo Mason #1 in 1994 and David as Dr. Snapper Foster #2 between 1975 and 1982.

Bach was found dead at her home in the Hollywood Hills with a self-inflicted gunshot wound on March 5, 2025, at the age of 62. Her death was ruled a suicide by the Los Angeles County Medical Examiner's Office.

== Filmography ==
- 1983 – Rumble Fish
- 1985 – Appointment with Fear
- 1988 – Some Nudity Required
- 1998 – Route 66
- 2000 – Castle Rock
- 2002 – More than Puppy Love

== Television work ==
- 1985 – Otherworld
- 1984 – Solid Gold
- 1985 – George Burns Comedy Week
- 1985 – T. J. Hooker
- 1985 – Knight Rider
- 1986 – The Fall Guy
- 1986 – Cheers
- 1986 – Throb
- 1988 – Sonny Spoon
- 1989 – Superboy
- 1989 – The New Lassie
- 1991 – Baywatch
- 1994 – The Young and the Restless
- 1995 – Sirens
- 1997 – Baywatch Nights
- 1998 – Viper
- 2011 – Celebrity Big Brother 2011
