= Route 66 (film) =

- Directed by: Steve Austin
- Written by: Shauna Leigh Austin
- Release date: 1998
- Country: United States
- Language: English

Route 66 is a 1998 American romance film directed by Steve Austin and starring Alana Austin, Diane Ladd, Richard Moll and Pamela Bach.

== Cast ==
- Alana Austin as Molly
- Jerry Asher as Billy
- Pamela Bach as Elizabeth
- Nick Benedict as Jeff
- Richard Danielson as Skeeter
- Diane Ladd
- Leslie Lauten as Bernice
- Kirsten Maryott as Ms. Barnes
- Micah May as Danny
- Richard Moll
