= George Hickenlooper =

American film director (1963–2010)

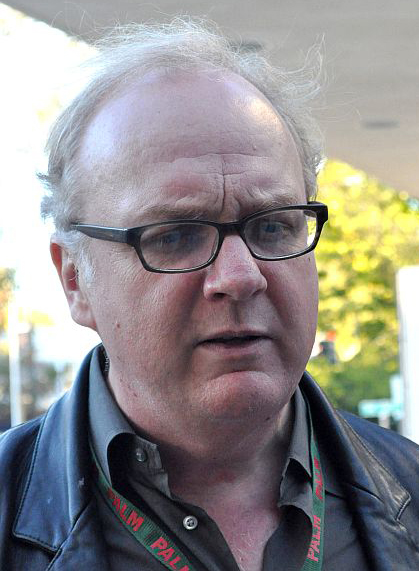
- Hickenlooper in 2010
- Born: George Loening Hickenlooper III; May 25, 1963; St. Louis, Missouri, U.S.
- Died: October 29, 2010 (aged 47); Denver, Colorado, U.S.
- Occupations: Producer; film director; writer
- Spouse: Suzanne Hickenlooper
- Children: 1
- Relatives: Olga Samaroff (great aunt); Andrew Hickenlooper (first cousin thrice removed); Smith Hickenlooper (second cousin twice removed); Bourke B. Hickenlooper (second cousin once removed); John Hickenlooper (third cousin twice removed)

George Loening Hickenlooper III (May 25, 1963 – October 29, 2010) was an American narrative and documentary filmmaker.

== Early life ==
Hickenlooper was born in St. Louis, the son of Barbara Jo Wenger, a social worker and stage actress, and George Loening Hickenlooper Jr., a teacher and playwright. He was also the grand nephew of British-born conductor Leopold Stokowski through marriage to his great-aunt, pianist Olga Samaroff (whose birth name was Lucy Mary Agnes Hickenlooper).

He attended high school at St. Louis University High, where he was part of a group of teenage filmmakers he informally called the "Splicers," whose members included James Gunn (Guardians of the Galaxy). After graduating from Yale University with a B.A. in History and Film Studies in 1986, Hickenlooper interned for the producer Roger Corman, and launched his directing career with Art, Acting, and the Suicide Chair: Dennis Hopper in 1988.

== Career ==
His first feature-length documentary, Hearts of Darkness: A Filmmaker's Apocalypse, explored the making of Apocalypse Now. It won several awards, including the National Board of Review award for "Best Documentary", an American Cinema Editors award for "Best Edited Documentary", two Academy of Television Arts and Sciences awards for "Outstanding Individual Achievement – Informational Programming – Directing" and "Outstanding Individual Achievement – Informational Programming – Picture Editing", and the International Documentary Association award. Hickenlooper himself won an Emmy for direction.

A short film written by Billy Bob Thornton, Some Folks Call It a Sling Blade (1994), "attracted considerable critical acclaim" for Hickenlooper and was "[a] hit on the festival circuit." Thornton parlayed the success into a full-length picture -- Sling Blade, which won an Oscar for its screenplay for Thornton, who also directed the film.

His final film, Casino Jack, was released two months after his death.

In addition to his films, Hickenlooper authored a book in 1991, Reel Conversations.

== Death ==
Hickenlooper died in his sleep on October 29, 2010, at the age of 47. Despite initial reports that Hickenlooper had suffered a heart attack, the coroner ruled that his death was the result of accidental painkiller overdose, combining oxymorphone with alcohol. Sleep apnea and a "moderately enlarged heart" were contributing factors.

== Filmography ==
=== Documentaries ===
- Art, Acting, and the Suicide Chair: Dennis Hopper, 1988
- Hearts of Darkness: A Filmmaker's Apocalypse, 1991
- Picture This: The Times of Peter Bogdanovich in Archer City, Texas, 1991
- The Big Brass Ring, 1997 (short)
- Monte Hellman: American Auteur, 1997 (short)
- Mayor of the Sunset Strip, 2003
- Speechless, 2008
- Out in the City, 2009 (short)
- "Hick" Town, 2009

=== Narrative films ===
- Ghost Brigade, 1993
- Some Folks Call It a Sling Blade, 1994 (short)
- The Low Life, 1995
- Crosstown Traffic, 1995 (failed pilot)
- Persons Unknown, 1996
- Dogtown, 1997
- The Big Brass Ring, 1999
- The Man from Elysian Fields, 2001
- Bizarre Love Triangle, 2005
- Factory Girl, 2006
- Casino Jack, 2010
