= Alice Doesn't Live Here Anymore =

1974 film directed by Martin Scorsese

- Theatrical release poster
- Directed by: Martin Scorsese
- Written by: Robert Getchell
- Produced by: Audrey Maas; David Susskind
- Starring: Ellen Burstyn; Kris Kristofferson; Alfred Lutter; Harvey Keitel; Jodie Foster; Vic Tayback; Diane Ladd; Valerie Curtin
- Cinematography: Kent L. Wakeford
- Edited by: Marcia Lucas
- Production company: Warner Bros.
- Distributed by: Warner Bros.
- Release dates: December 9, 1974 (Los Angeles); January 29, 1975 (New York City)
- Running time: 112 minutes
- Country: United States
- Language: English
- Budget: $1.8 million
- Box office: $18.6 million

Alice Doesn't Live Here Anymore is a 1974 American romantic comedy drama film directed by Martin Scorsese and written by Robert Getchell. It stars Ellen Burstyn as a widow who travels with her preteen son across the Southwestern United States in search of a better life. Kris Kristofferson, Billy "Green" Bush, Diane Ladd, Valerie Curtin, Lelia Goldoni, Vic Tayback, Jodie Foster, Alfred Lutter, and Harvey Keitel appear in supporting roles.

The film was released theatrically on December 9, 1974, by Warner Bros., and it later premiered at the 28th Cannes Film Festival, where it competed for the Palme d'Or. It was a critical and commercial success, grossing $21 million on a $1.8 million budget. At the 47th Academy Awards, Burstyn won Best Actress, and Ladd and Getchell were nominated for Best Supporting Actress and Best Original Screenplay.

The film was adapted into a popular television series, Alice, that aired on CBS from 1976 to 1985.

== Plot ==
In Socorro, New Mexico, Alice Hyatt's abusive husband, Donald, a Coca-Cola delivery driver, is killed on the job in a traffic accident. A former singer, Alice sells most of her belongings, intending to take her son, Tommy, to her childhood home of Monterey, California, where she hopes to pursue the singing career she abandoned when she married Donald.

Their financial situation forces them to take temporary lodgings in Phoenix, Arizona, where she finds work as a lounge singer. She meets Ben, a younger, seemingly unmarried man who charms her into a sexual relationship that comes to a sudden end when his wife, Rita, confronts Alice. Ben breaks into Alice's apartment while Rita is there and physically assaults Rita in front of Alice. He also threatens Alice and smashes up her apartment. Fearing for their safety, Alice and Tommy quickly leave town.

Having spent most of what little money they had on their escape, Alice takes a job as a waitress in Tucson, Arizona, at a local diner owned by Mel. There, she bonds with her fellow servers—independent, no-nonsense, outspoken Flo and quiet, timid, incompetent Vera—and meets divorced local rancher David. He quickly becomes enamored of Alice, who is wary of pursuing another relationship but begins to warm to him as he establishes a paternal relationship with Tommy.

Their relationship is threatened when David uses physical force to discipline Tommy. Although Alice still dreams of going to Monterey, they reconcile. David offers to sell his ranch and move to Monterey, but in the end, Alice decides to stay in Tucson with him.

== Cast ==
- Ellen Burstyn as Alice Hyatt (née Graham), a widowed single mother who dreams of being a professional singer in Monterey
  - Mia Bendixsen as Alice, age 8
- Kris Kristofferson as David, a regular customer of Mel and Ruby's Cafe who becomes Alice's love interest
- Billy "Green" Bush as Donald Hyatt, Alice's husband, who is killed in a traffic accident early in the film
- Diane Ladd as Florence Jean ("Flo") Castleberry, a hardened, sharp-tongued waitress at Mel and Ruby's Cafe
- Lelia Goldoni as Bea, Alice's friend and neighbor in Socorro
- Lane Bradbury as Rita Eberhardt, Ben's wife
- Vic Tayback as Mel Sharples, a short order cook who owns a diner in Tucson
- Jodie Foster as Audrey, a girl Tommy befriends in Tucson
- Harvey Keitel as Ben Eberhardt, an abusive married man who has an affair with Alice
- Valerie Curtin as Vera Gorman, a shy, awkward waitress at Mel and Ruby's Cafe
- Harry Northup as Joe & Jim's bartender
- Alfred Lutter as Tommy Hyatt, Alice's preteen son

=== Uncredited ===
Director Martin Scorsese cameos as a customer in Mel's diner, and Diane Ladd's daughter, Laura Dern, appears as a little girl eating an ice cream cone.

== Production ==
Ellen Burstyn was still in the midst of filming The Exorcist when Warner Bros. executives expressed interest in working with her on another project. Burstyn recalled: "It was early in the woman's movement, and we were all just waking up and having a look at the pattern of our lives and wanting it to be different ... I wanted to make a different kind of film. A film from a woman's point of view, but a woman that I recognized, that I knew. And not just myself, but my friends, what we were all going through at the time. So my agent found Alice Doesn't Live Here Anymore ... When I read it I liked it a lot. I sent it to Warner Bros. and they agreed to do it. Then they asked who I wanted to direct it. I said that I didn't know, but I wanted somebody new and young and exciting. I called Francis Coppola and asked who was young and exciting and he said 'Go look at a movie called Mean Streets and see what you think.' It hadn't been released yet, so I booked a screening to look at it and I felt that it was exactly what ... Alice needed, because [it] was a wonderful script and well written, but for my taste it was a little slick. You know – in a good way, in a kind of Doris Day–Rock Hudson kind of way. I wanted something a bit more gritty."

Burstyn described her collaboration with Scorsese, making his first Hollywood studio production, as "one of the best experiences I've ever had". He agreed with her that the film should have a message. "It's a picture about emotions and feelings and relationships and people in chaos," he said. "We felt like charting all that and showing the differences and showing people making terrible mistakes ruining their lives and then realizing it and trying to push back when everything is crumbling – without getting into soap opera. We opened ourselves up to a lot of experimentation."

The part of Alice was offered to Shirley MacLaine, who turned it down. In a 2005 interview, she said she regretted that decision.

Scorsese's casting director auditioned 300 boys for the role of Tommy before they discovered Alfred Lutter. "I met the kid in my hotel room and he was kind of quiet and shy," Scorsese said. But when he paired him with Burstyn and suggested she deviate from the script, he held his own. "Usually, when we were improvising with the kids, they would either freeze and look down or go right back to the script. But this kid, you couldn't shut him up."

The film was shot on location predominantly in and around Tucson, but some scenes were shot in Amado, Arizona, and Phoenix. A Mel's Diner still exists in Phoenix.

The soundtrack includes "All the Way from Memphis" by Mott the Hoople; "Roll Away the Stone" by Leon Russell; "Daniel" by Elton John; "Jeepster" by T-Rex; and "I Will Always Love You" by Dolly Parton. During her lounge act, Alice sings "Where or When" by Richard Rodgers and Lorenz Hart; "When Your Lover Has Gone" by Einar Aaron Swan; "Gone with the Wind" by Allie Wrubel and Herb Magidson; and "I've Got a Crush on You" by George and Ira Gershwin. In a film clip from Coney Island, Betty Grable is heard singing "Cuddle Up a Little Closer, Lovey Mine" by Otto A. Harbach and Karl Hoschna; and in a film clip from Hello Frisco, Hello, Alice Faye performs "You'll Never Know" by Harry Warren and Mack Gordon.

The opening of the film was shot in one day using a set that cost $85,000 to build.

The first cut of the film was three hours and sixteen minutes long.

== Reception ==
Vincent Canby of The New York Times called the film a "fine, moving, frequently hilarious tale", and wrote that "the center of the movie and giving it a visible sensibility is Miss Burstyn, one of the few actresses at work today ... who is able to seem appealing, tough, intelligent, funny, and bereft, all at approximately the same moment ... Two other performances must be noted, those of Diane Ladd and Valerie Curtin ... Their marvelous contributions in small roles are a measure of the film's quality and of Mr. Scorsese's fully realized talents as one of the best of the new American filmmakers."

Roger Ebert of the Chicago Sun-Times called the film "one of the most perceptive, funny, occasionally painful portraits of an American woman I've seen." He wrote: "The movie has been both attacked and defended on feminist grounds, but I think it belongs somewhere outside ideology, maybe in the area of contemporary myth and romance." Ebert placed the film third of his list of the best films of 1975 (even though it was released in December 1974).

Judith Crist praised Burstyn for "making us care about her in all her incredibilities, stripping the character to its essential warmth as a woman, concerns as a mother, dependencies as a wife, and yearnings as an individual." But she criticized Scorsese's direction, writing that he was "putting on a camera show of his own, the handheld pursuit of the image lending an exhausting freneticism to what is melodrama enough on its own."

Pauline Kael of The New Yorker wrote, "Alice is thoroughly enjoyable: funny, absorbing, intelligent even when you don't believe in what's going on—when the issues it raises get all fouled up." TV Guide rated the film three out of four stars, calling it "effective but uneven" with performances that "cannot conceal the storyline's shortcomings." Arthur D. Murphy of Variety called the film "a distended bore", adding that it "takes a group of well-cast film players and largely wastes them on a smaller-than-life film—one of those 'little people' dramas that makes one despise little people."

Gene Siskel of the Chicago Tribune gave the film two stars out of four, writing, "[t]he characters aren't real, the situations in which they are placed aren't real, and, as a result, one cares little how the alleged relationships develop." Charles Champlin of the Los Angeles Times called Burstyn's performance "highly charged and sympathetic", and Ladd "wonderful". But he felt the film was "seemingly uncertain whether to be a stylized and updating revision of the romantic comedy modes of the late '30s or a rough-and-tumble piece of social realism flavored with bitter comedy." Similarly, Molly Haskell of The Village Voice felt the film was inconsistent in its attempt to "make a 'woman's picture' that will satisfy contemporary audiences' hunger for a heroine of some stature and significance, while at the same time allowing Scorsese to pay ironic tribute to the tear-jerkers and spunky showbiz sagas of the past and such demigoddesses as Alice Faye and Betty Grable." Overall, she felt, "the fault is largely that too many cooks have been allowed to contribute their ingredients (they're called 'life moments' and the result is inorganic soup), without a guiding intelligence."

On Rotten Tomatoes, the film has an approval rating of 92%, based on 83 reviews, with an average rating of 7.5/10. The website's consensus states: "Alice Doesn't Live Here Anymore finds Martin Scorsese wielding a somewhat gentler palette than usual, with generally absorbing results." On Metacritic, the film has a weighted average score of 78 out of 100, based on 11 critics, indicating "generally favorable" reviews.

=== Accolades ===
Award	Category	Nominee(s)	Result
Academy Awards	Best Actress	Ellen Burstyn	Won
Academy Awards	Best Supporting Actress	Diane Ladd	Nominated
Academy Awards	Best Original Screenplay	Robert Getchell	Nominated
British Academy Film Awards	Best Film	Martin Scorsese	Won
British Academy Film Awards	Best Direction	Martin Scorsese	Nominated
British Academy Film Awards	Best Actress in a Leading Role	Ellen Burstyn	Won
British Academy Film Awards	Best Actress in a Supporting Role	Lelia Goldoni	Nominated
British Academy Film Awards	Best Actress in a Supporting Role	Diane Ladd	Won
British Academy Film Awards	Best Screenplay	Robert Getchell	Won
British Academy Film Awards	Most Promising Newcomer to Leading Film Roles	Alfred Lutter	Nominated
Cannes Film Festival	Palme D'Or	Martin Scorsese	Nominated
Golden Globe Awards	Best Actress in a Motion Picture – Drama	Ellen Burstyn	Nominated
Golden Globe Awards	Best Supporting Actress – Motion Picture	Diane Ladd	Nominated
National Board of Review Awards	Top Ten Films		10th Place
New York Film Critics Circle Awards	Best Actress	Ellen Burstyn	Nominated
New York Film Critics Circle Awards	Best Supporting Actress	Diane Ladd	Nominated
Writers Guild of America Awards	Best Drama Written Directly for the Screenplay	Robert Getchell	Nominated

== Television adaptation ==
The film inspired the sitcom Alice, which was broadcast on CBS from 1976 to 1985. The only member of the film cast to reprise his role was Vic Tayback as Mel (though his diner was moved to Phoenix). Lutter portrayed Tommy in the pilot episode but was replaced by Philip McKeon for the series. Ladd joined the show later in its run, but in a different role than she played in the film (Ladd replaced the Flo character in the series as a character named Belle). Linda Lavin took the role of Alice in the series after Burstyn said she wouldn't do television. Beth Howland played Vera in the series. The character of Flo was later spun off into yet another series, Flo.

== Home media ==
Warner Home Video released the film on Region 1 DVD on August 17, 2004. It is in anamorphic widescreen with audio tracks in English and French and subtitles in English, French, and Spanish. Bonus features include commentary by Scorsese, Burstyn, and Kristofferson, and Second Chances, a background look at the making of the film. The Criterion Collection released the film on Blu-ray and 4K Ultra HD on July 14, 2026.

== See also ==
- List of American films of 1974

== Works cited ==
- Wilson, Michael (2011). Scorsese On Scorsese. Cahiers du Cinéma. ISBN 9782866427023.
