= Joel Hershman =

American film director

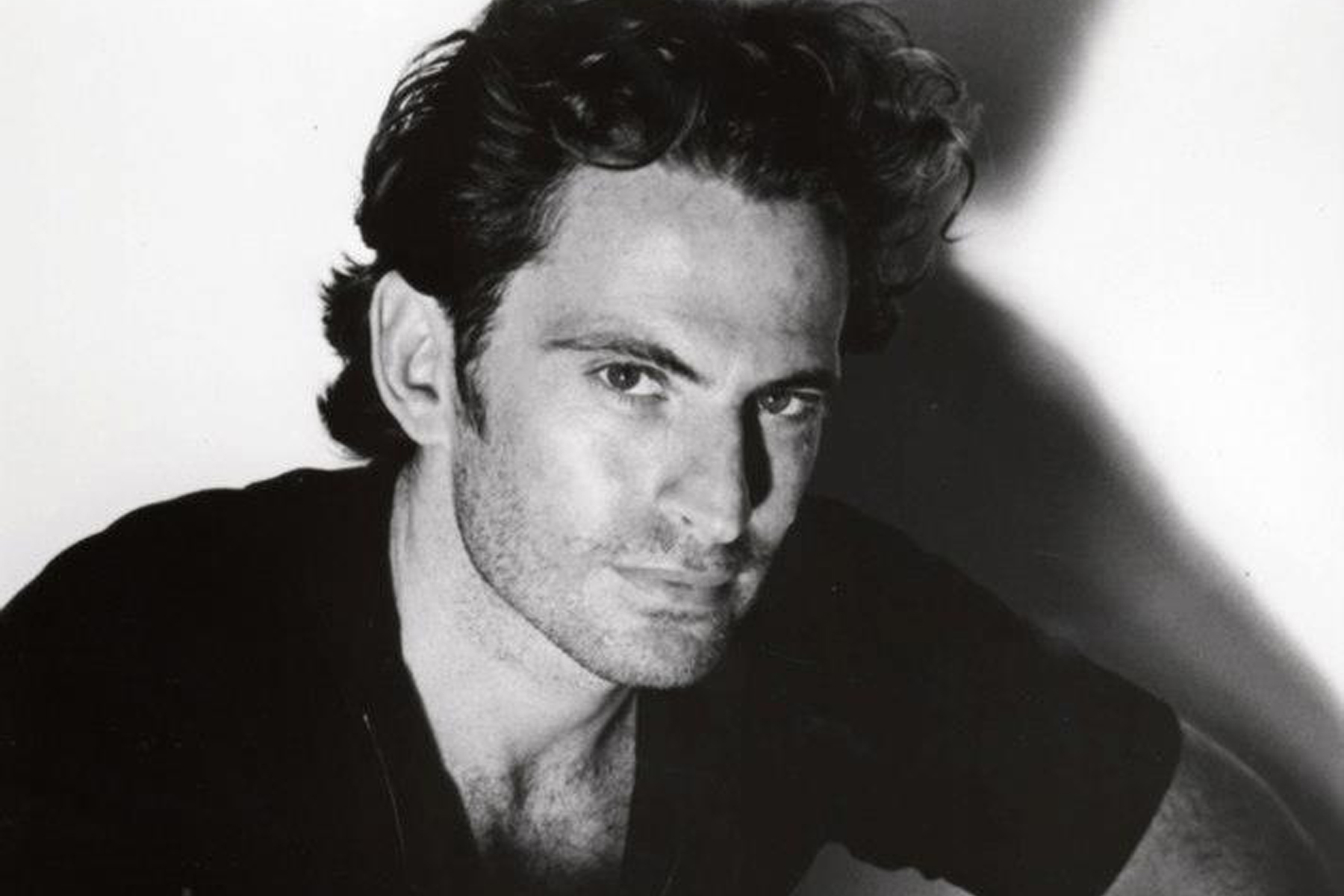
- Born: 1958 (age 66–67); Brooklyn, New York City, United States
- Occupation(s): Film director, writer, producer

Joel Hershman is an American film director, writer and producer. He is from Brooklyn, New York City.

Hershman is best known for the films Greenfingers starring Clive Owen and Helen Mirren and Hold Me, Thrill Me, Kiss Me starring Sean Young and Adrienne Shelly.

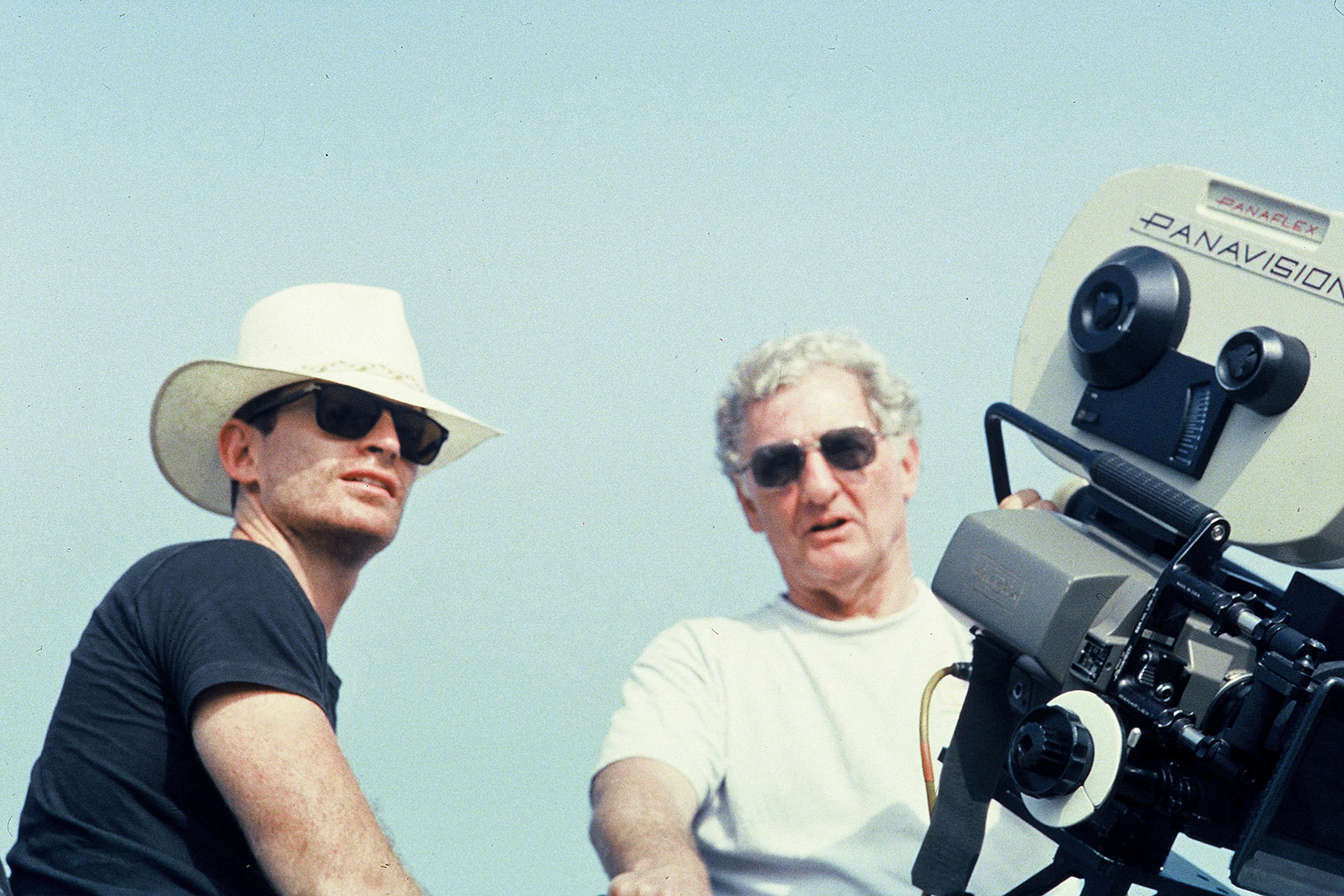
Hershman (left) on set with cinematographer Kent L. Wakeford on Hold Me, Thrill Me, Kiss Me in 1992

== Filmography ==
- 1992: Hold Me, Thrill Me, Kiss Me
- 2000: Greenfingers
