= Some Folks Call It a Sling Blade =

- Directed by: George Hickenlooper
- Written by: Billy Bob Thornton
- Produced by: George Hickenlooper
- Starring: Billy Bob Thornton; Molly Ringwald; J.T. Walsh
- Cinematography: Kent L. Wakeford
- Edited by: Henny Bouwmeester; George Hickenlooper
- Music by: Bill Boll
- Release date: 1994
- Running time: 29 minutes
- Country: United States
- Language: English

Some Folks Call It a Sling Blade is a 1994 short film written by Billy Bob Thornton, directed by George Hickenlooper and starring Thornton, Molly Ringwald, and J.T. Walsh.

It was adapted into the 1996 feature film Sling Blade, also starring Thornton, which won Thornton the Academy Award for Best Adapted Screenplay, as well as a nomination for Best Actor in a Leading Role.

== Overview ==
Thornton plays Karl Childers, an intellectually disabled man who has been in a mental hospital for the past 25 years for murdering his mother and her lover. On the day of his release, he is interviewed by a reporter, Theresa Tatum (Molly Ringwald), who is writing an article with the intent of examining whether criminals judged to be insane should be released. Before the interview, Tatum is of the opinion that criminals like Childers should never be released. During the interview, however, Tatum must question her previous beliefs.

The title of the film comes from Childers's description of the murders. He admits to committing murder with a kaiser blade: "Some folks call it a sling blade, I call it a Kaiser blade."
