= Isle of Hope (film) =

- Directed by: Damian Romay
- Written by: Damian Romay
- Starring: Diane Ladd; Mary Stuart Masterson; Andrew McCarthy; Sam Robards; Jessica Lynn Wallace
- Release date: December 9, 2022
- Running time: 96 minutes
- Country: United States
- Language: English

Isle of Hope is a 2022 American drama film written and directed by Damian Romay and starring Diane Ladd, Mary Stuart Masterson, Andrew McCarthy, Sam Robards and Jessica Lynn Wallace.

== Cast ==
- Mary Stuart Masterson as Victoria
- Diane Ladd as Carmen
- Andrew McCarthy as Andrew
- Sam Robards as William
- Jessica Lynn Wallace as Eleonor

== Release ==
The film was released on December 9, 2022.

== Reception ==
Michael Talbot-Haynes of Film Threat rated the film an 8 out of 10.

Sandie Angulo Chen of Common Sense Media awarded the film three stars out of five.
