= Imagining America =

1989 American anthology film

- Directed by: Ralph Bakshi; Mustapha Khan; Edward Lachman; Matt Mahurin
- Written by: Ralph Bakshi
- Produced by: Richard Singer
- Starring: Harvey Keitel; Ron Thompson; Richard Singer
- Cinematography: Kent L. Wakeford
- Production companies: KCET; South Carolina Educational Television; WGBH; WNET
- Distributed by: PBS
- Release date: June 7, 1989
- Country: United States
- Language: English

Imagining America is a 1989 anthology film consisting of four shorts with the central theme being life in the United States. It was originally broadcast on the PBS television series American Playhouse.

== Overview ==
Imagining America is an anthology of four short films by different directors. Ralph Bakshi's This Ain't Bebop is about a man's odyssey through surreal downtown Los Angeles as he tries to find the life he once had. Ed Lachman's Get Your Kicks on Route 66 tells the story of America's famous highway. Tribe by Matt Mahurin examines myths in American society. Reflections of a Native Son by Mustapha Khan is a stylized portrait of the South Bronx district of New York City.

== Style ==
The original TV series American Playhouse is produced by John H. Williams, and it is from this series the four pieces to this anthology comes. Together they give a personal view of America. Only one of the four, Ralph Bakshi's This Ain't Bebop, is a narrative, while two others are documentaries: Ed Lachman's Get Your Kicks on Route 66 is about the great American '50s highway and Mustapha Khan's Reflections of a Native Son is a vivid look at the teenage subculture of South Bronx. The fourth piece is Matt Mahurin's Tribe, a cross between impressionist documentary, music video and live-action photo-essay.

== Cast ==
- Harvey Keitel as himself
  - Craig Stark as Young Harvey Keitel
- Ron Thompson as Beatnik Poet
- Margaret Howell as Beat Poetess
- Dean Hill as Neal Cassidy
- Sean Heyman as Hipster
- Kara "Chavez" Sachs as Street Walker
- Rick Singer as Neal Cassady
- John Nesci as The Narrator
- Mary Pat Gleason

== See also ==
- United States in the 1950s
- The Beat Generation
- American Pop, 1981 animated film by Bakshi similar in content
