= Stephen Humphrey Bogart =

American writer, film producer, and businessman (born 1949)

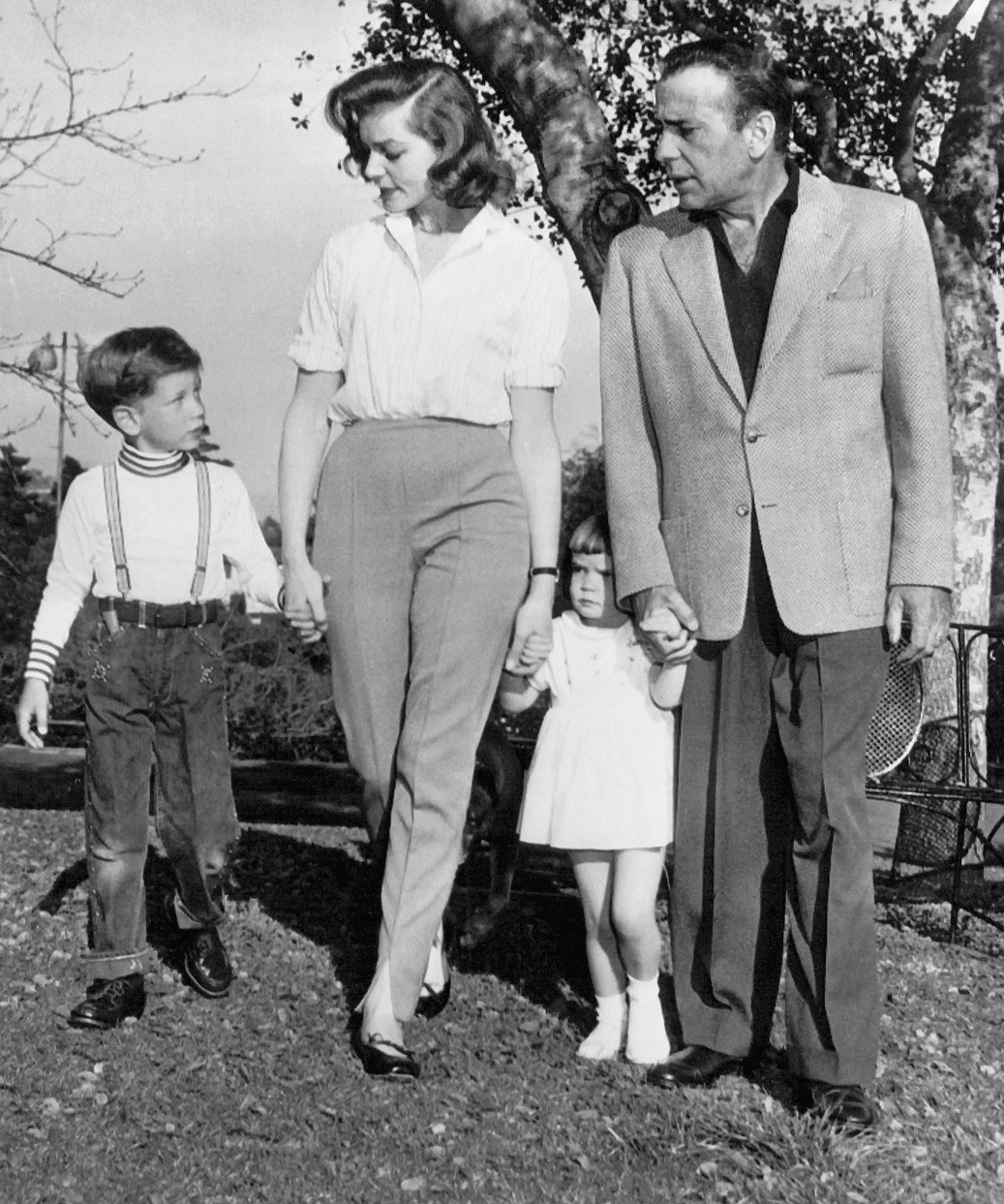
- Bogart with his mother, sister Leslie, and father (c. April 1956)
- Born: January 6, 1949 (age 77); Los Angeles, California, U.S.
- Education: University of Hartford
- Occupations: Writer, producer, businessman
- Spouses: Dale Bogart (m. 1969; div. 1984) Barbara Bogart (m. 1985; div. 2010) Carla Soviero (m. 2014)
- Children: 3
- Parent(s): Humphrey Bogart; Lauren Bacall
- Relatives: Sam Robards (maternal half-brother); Maud Humphrey (paternal grandmother)

Stephen Humphrey Bogart (born January 6, 1949) is an American writer, producer, and businessman. He is one of the two children of actor Humphrey Bogart and actress Lauren Bacall, and authored three semi-autobiographical books about his family.

== Early life ==
Stephen Humphrey Bogart was born on January 6, 1949, in Los Angeles, California, to actress Lauren Bacall and actor Humphrey Bogart at the Cedars of Lebanon Hospital. Raised in the affluent Holmby Hills neighborhood of Los Angeles, Bogart and his younger sister, Leslie, counted Judy Garland and Frank Sinatra among their neighbors and family friends. While his mother was a non-practicing Jew, Stephen and Leslie were christened and raised in their father's Episcopal faith and attended Sunday school.

Following his father's death in 1957, the family relocated to his father's native New York City, where Bogart's mother had purchased an apartment at The Dakota.

His half-brother is the actor Sam Robards, son of Bacall and her second husband, Jason Robards.

Bogart enrolled at the Milton Academy, where he graduated in 1967. Afterward, he enrolled in the University of Pennsylvania and majored in English. He reported that he was unhappy with this, and changed to Boston University in 1969.

Bogart met his first wife, Dale Gemelli, there. The couple married in 1969 and divorced in 1984. He has since married twice.

== Career ==
Bogart began his working career as an insurance agent, while he studied mass communications at the University of Hartford. He pursued a career in television news. At age 39, he moved from New York to become a producer for NBC's Sunday Today. Later, he took a job as an executive producer of a television news department.

Bogart oversees the management of the estate of Humphrey Bogart. The business owns and manages the name, image, and likeness rights of Humphrey Bogart. The estate hosts an annual Humphrey Bogart Film Festival in Key Largo, Florida. The estate owns and manages Santana Films, the successor to Humphrey Bogart's company, Santana Productions. The business is also the founding partner of the Bogart Spirits liquor brand.

Bogart hosted festivals celebrating the 70th and 75th anniversary of the film Casablanca (which his father starred in) in 2012 and 2017.

== Personal life ==
Bogart has three adult children and as of 2013 lives in Naples, Florida. He is the brother-in-law of author and yoga master Erich Schiffmann.

== Works ==
Bogart wrote the books Bogart: In Search of My Father, Play it Again, and The Remake: As Time Goes By.
