= Sam Robards =

American actor (born 1961)

- Born: Sam Prideaux Robards; December 16, 1961 (age 64); New York City, U.S.
- Occupation: Actor
- Years active: 1980–present
- Spouses: Suzy Amis (m. 1986; div. 1994) Sidsel Jensen Robards (m. 1997)
- Children: 3
- Parents: Jason Robards; Lauren Bacall
- Relatives: Stephen Humphrey Bogart (maternal half-brother); Jason Robards Sr. (grandfather)

Sam Prideaux Robards (born December 16, 1961) is an American actor. He is best known for his film roles in American Beauty (1999) and A.I. Artificial Intelligence (2001). For his performance in the Broadway production of The Man Who Had All the Luck, he received a nomination for the Tony Award for Best Featured Actor in a Play.

== Early life ==
Robards was born in New York City, the son of actor Jason Robards (1922–2000) and actress Lauren Bacall (1924–2014). He is the only child of their marriage, though he has seven half-siblings: five through his father (three elder, two younger); and two – Stephen Humphrey Bogart and Leslie Bogart – through his mother's previous marriage to Humphrey Bogart. He lived for a time in London, where he attended the American School in London, then returned to New York City, where he attended Collegiate School.

Robards then attended Sarah Lawrence College. In the fall of 1980, he attended the National Theater Institute at the Eugene O'Neill Theater Center in Waterford, Connecticut.

== Career ==
Robards began his acting career in 1980 in an off-Broadway production of Album, and made his feature-film debut in director Paul Mazursky's 1982 film Tempest. In 1985, Robards starred alongside Kevin Costner and future wife Suzy Amis in Fandango. Robards acted opposite his father in the 1988 film Bright Lights, Big City, which was their only collaboration before his death in 2000. Also in 1988, he was cast in the lead role of Kevin Keegan in the CBS drama TV 101.

In 1990, he played the role of Chris Elliott's friend, Larry, on the Fox sitcom Get a Life. In 1994, Robards starred in two films: Robert Altman's film Prêt-à-Porter, where he was a part of an ensemble that included his mother; and Alan Rudolph's biographical film of Dorothy Parker, Mrs. Parker and the Vicious Circle, where he portrayed the first editor of The New Yorker, Harold Ross.

In 2002, Robards received acclaim for his performance as Gustav Eberson in the Broadway revival of Arthur Miller's The Man Who Had All the Luck, winning the Clarence Derwent Award and earning nominations for the Tony Award and Drama Desk Award. In July 2008, he took over the role of Richard Hannay in the Broadway run of The 39 Steps.

In 2025, Robards was cast in the role of David/Raf's Dad in the Broadway run of Punch.

His film credits also include Casualties of War, Beautiful Girls, American Beauty, A.I. Artificial Intelligence, Life as a House, The Other Side of the Tracks, and The Art of Getting By.

Robards's television credits include a recurring roles on and appearances on Spin City, The West Wing, Law & Order, Law & Order: Criminal Intent, Sex and the City, The Good Wife and Hotel Cocaine. He had recurring roles on the series Gossip Girl and Treme.

== Personal life ==
In 1986, he married actress Suzy Amis, his co-star in Fandango. They have a son, Jasper, born before their divorce in 1994. In 1997, Robards married Danish model Sidsel Jensen. They have two sons, Calvin and Sebastian.

== Filmography ==
=== Film ===
| Year | Title | Role | Notes |
|---|---|---|---|
| 1982 | Tempest | Teddy | |
| 1985 | Fandango | Kenneth Waggener | |
| 1985 | Not Quite Paradise | Mike | |
| 1988 | Bright Lights, Big City | Rich Vanier | |
| 1988 | Bird | Moscowitz | |
| 1989 | Casualties of War | Chaplain Kirk | |
| 1993 | The Ballad of Little Jo | Jasper Hill | |
| 1994 | Mrs. Parker and the Vicious Circle | Harold Ross | |
| 1994 | Prêt-à-Porter | Regina's Assistant | |
| 1996 | Beautiful Girls | Steve Rossmore | |
| 1997 | Dinner and Driving | Frank | |
| 1998 | Love from Ground Zero | Henry (voice) | |
| 1999 | American Beauty | Jim Berkley | |
| 2000 | Bounce | Todd Exner | |
| 2001 | A.I. Artificial Intelligence | Henry Swinton | |
| 2001 | Life as a House | David Dokos | |
| 2004 | Catch That Kid | Tom | |
| 2004 | Surviving Eden | Gary Gold | |
| 2004 | Marmalade | Roger | |
| 2007 | Awake | Clayton Beresford Sr. | |
| 2008 | The Other Side of the Tracks | David | |
| 2008 | Che: Part One | Tad Szulc | |
| 2008 | Perestroika | Sasha | |
| 2009 | The Rebound | Frank | |
| 2009 | Company Retreat | Ron Gable | |
| 2011 | The Art of Getting By | Jack Sargent | |
| 2014 | Grand Street | Gary | |
| 2016 | The Late Bloomer | Dr. Lawson | |
| 2016 | Broken Links | Jack | |
| 2017 | Where Is Kyra? | Carl | |
| 2022 | Isle of Hope | William | |

=== Television ===
| Year | Title | Role | Notes |
|---|---|---|---|
| 1983 | Prisoner Without a Name, Cell Without a Number | Daniel Timerman | Television film |
| 1985 | Spenser: For Hire | Chip Holmby | Episode: "The Choice" |
| 1985 | Into Thin Air | Stephen Walker | Television film |
| 1988 | Pancho Barnes | Gene McKendry | Television film |
| 1988–1989 | TV 101 | Kevin Keegan | 17 episodes |
| 1990–1991 | Get a Life | Larry Potter | 24 episodes |
| 1993, 2009 | Law & Order | Davis Webb / Daniel Hendricks | 2 episodes |
| 1995 | The Outer Limits | Ben Kohler | Episode: "Living Hell" |
| 1995 | Donor Unknown | Dr. David Bausch | Television film |
| 1996 | The Man Who Captured Eichmann | David | Television film |
| 1997 | The Trial of Adolf Eichmann | Avraham Aviel | Television film |
| 1998 | Maximum Bob | Sheriff Gary Hammond | 7 episodes |
| 1998–1999 | Spin City | Arthur | 4 episodes |
| 1999 | Black and Blue | Mike Riordan | Television film |
| 2000 | Sex and the City | Tom Reymi | Episode: "Running with Scissors" |
| 2000 | Hamlet | Fortinbras | Television film |
| 2001 | The Warden | Axel | Television film |
| 2001 | On Golden Pond | Bill Ray | Television film |
| 2002 | Obsessed | David Stillman | Television film |
| 2003 | My Life with Men | Jess Zebrowski | Television film |
| 2004 | The Blackwater Lightship | Paul | Television film |
| 2004 | Clubhouse | Bennet | Episode: "Chin Music" |
| 2004 | Law & Order: Criminal Intent | Paul Whitlock | Episode: "Magnificat" |
| 2004–2005 | The West Wing | Greg Brock | 8 episodes |
| 2006 | CSI: Miami | Mitchell Collett | Episode: "Dead Air" |
| 2007–2012 | Gossip Girl | Howie 'The Captain' Archibald | 16 episodes |
| 2010 | Vamped Out | Audition Actor #1 | Episode: "A New Day" |
| 2011 | Body of Proof | Bradford Paige | Episode: "Pilot" |
| 2011 | Blue Bloods | Roger Carson | Episode: "My Funny Valentine" |
| 2011 | The Good Wife | Jarvis Bowes | Episode: "Killer Song" |
| 2012–2013 | Treme | Tim Feeny | 11 episodes |
| 2013–2014 | Twisted | Kyle Masterson | 19 episodes |
| 2015 | Limitless | Miles Amos | Episode: "Badge! Gun!" |
| 2019 | Madam Secretary | Major Brad Jenkins | Episode: "Valor" |
| 2021 | Y: The Last Man | Dean Brown | 2 episodes |

== Awards and nominations ==
| Year | Association | Category | Nominated work | Result |
|---|---|---|---|---|
| 1983 | Young Artist Awards | Best Young Supporting Actor in a Motion Picture | Tempest | Nominated |
| 2002 | Drama Desk Awards | Outstanding Featured Actor in a Play | The Man Who Had All the Luck | Nominated |
| 2002 | Clarence Derwent Awards | Most Promising Male | The Man Who Had All the Luck | Won |
| 2002 | Tony Awards | Best Featured Actor in a Play | The Man Who Had All the Luck | Nominated |
