= Greenfingers =

2000 British comedy film by Joel Hershman

- Cover of the 2002 DVD release
- Directed by: Joel Hershman
- Written by: Joel Hershman
- Produced by: Trudie Styler; Travis Swords; Daniel J. Victor
- Starring: Clive Owen; Helen Mirren; David Kelly
- Cinematography: John Daly
- Edited by: Tariq Anwar
- Distributed by: Metro-Goldwyn-Mayer; Winchester Films
- Release dates: 10 September 2000 (TIFF); 14 September 2001 (United Kingdom)
- Running time: 91 minutes
- Country: United Kingdom
- Language: English
- Budget: £2 million
- Box office: $1.9 million

Greenfingers is a 2000 British comedy film directed and written by Joel Hershman. It is loosely based on the true story about the award-winning prisoners of HMP Leyhill, a minimum-security prison in the Cotswolds, England, a story published in The New York Times in 1998.

== Plot ==
When Colin Briggs, a convicted murderer, is placed in the experimental H.M.P. Edgefield programme to finish off his prison sentence, all he wants is peace and quiet. After his wise, elderly roommate Fergus (a recovering alcoholic imprisoned for killing three wives) introduces him to gardening, Colin uncovers a talent and passion for plants. When a row erupts between cellmates about a patch of double-violets Colin had secretly planted, warden Gov. Hodge assigns him to cultivate a garden with fellow prisoners Tony, Jimmy, and Raw.

Georgina Woodhouse, a celebrated gardener and author, visits the prison garden and gives it a good review. She recruits the prisoners for work release, gardening at an estate. While on the job, Colin falls in love with Georgina's daughter, Primrose. Despite opposition from its Board, Georgina arranges for the Edgefield gardeners to compete in the Hampton Court Flower Show.

Unfortunately, the estate is robbed of a priceless tapestry and the police suspect that at least one of the prisoners is responsible. The team's invitation to compete at Hampton Court is canceled. Tony, the prime suspect, runs away.

Colin tells the parole board that gardening has helped rehabilitate him and he's approved for release. Before leaving, Colin eventually tells Fergus how, when he was 18, he beat his younger brother to death in a blind rage for having an affair with the girl he was about to marry.

Upon his release, Colin moves into a spare room on the Woodhouse property. He and Primrose make their romantic relationship official. This upsets Georgina, who worries for Primrose's safety.

It's discovered that none of the prisoners were responsible for the estate's robbery, hence they can once again compete at the flower show. During a visit, Jimmy and Raw inform Colin that Fergus's health is failing. Colin, wanting to join his team in the competition, breaks into a flower shop, steals a bunch of yellow roses that he delivers to Primrose's doorstep to tell her that their relationship must end and is sent back to Edgefield.

The visiting Home Secretary tells the gardeners to create a desert-like rock garden for the Show that would be metaphorical of imprisonment, much to Colin's annoyance. The group gets to work but Fergus passes away and Colin burns down the rock garden under the cover of night. This allows the Edgefield prisoners to create a new, lush garden from scratch.

At Hampton Court, Colin scatters Fergus's ashes in the garden that Edgefield has submitted for competition. Georgina arranges an encounter between Primrose and Colin, who reconcile over his breaking parole. He asks if she'll wait for him until he's released the following spring, to which she agrees.

The Edgefield garden creates a stir yet fails to place in competition, but Gov. Hodge tells the prisoners that he's incredibly proud of their efforts. Before the event is over, though, they are convoked by H.M. Queen Elizabeth II, the Show's Patron; she wants a private meeting with Colin, Raw, and Jimmy because she feels, unofficially, that they were robbed at judging. An epilogue reveals the Edgefield prisoners went on to win the most prestigious gardening awards for their future gardens.

== Cast ==
- Clive Owen – Colin Briggs
- Helen Mirren – Georgina Woodhouse
- Natasha Little – Primrose Woodhouse
- David Kelly – Fergus Wilks
- Warren Clarke – Gov. Hodge
- Danny Dyer – Tony
- Adam Fogerty – Raw
- Paterson Joseph – Jimmy
- Lucy Punch – Holly
- David Lyon – Home Secretary

== Production ==
The film was shot in Britain in five weeks on a budget of £2 million, with the help of the Royal Horticultural Society and English garden designer Rosemary Verey.

== Reception ==
The film received mixed-to-negative reviews. Roger Ebert gave it two out of four stars, calling the film "twee," and "amusing enough," though he felt that people should wait to watch Greenfingers on cable television.

Peter Bradshaw of The Guardian similarly wrote that the film was "An amiable, fairly unexceptionable, and very English little film, though written and directed by the American Joel Hershman..." and declared it "slightly racy but pretty unexciting."

Dave Kehr of The New York Times criticized the film for "[striving] to be an adorable Anglo-Irish comedy," and coming across "as synthetic as a rubber rose." He also felt protagonist Colin's development into an avid gardener was rushed.

The Miami Herald's critic Connie Ogle was more positive, categorizing the film as "Britquirk, films about odd, good-hearted, thick-accented underdogs." Ogle wrote that the film was "pleasant, mildly uplifting entertainment," and "Greenfingers combats its inherent corniness with doses of wry humor."

== Other versions ==
A Japanese version headed by Japanese group Arashi member Masaki Aiba was held on stage in Tokyo in 2009.
