= More than Puppy Love =

- Directed by: Tom Whitus
- Written by: Tom Whitus
- Distributed by: Allumination FilmWorks
- Release date: March 10, 2002
- Running time: 85 minutes
- Country: United States
- Language: English

More than Puppy Love is a 2002 American family film directed by Tom Whitus and starring Pamela Bach and Diane Ladd.

== Plot ==
A family is given a puppy for a year to undergo domestic training to become a help dog for the disabled. The young daughter in the household becomes a best friend of the puppy and finds it difficult to be parted from him when the time is up for him to leave.

== Cast ==
- Diane Ladd ... Aunt Edna
- Pamela Bach ... Marie
- Craig Benton ... Curtis
- Jim Petersmith ... Charles Barnett
- Hollis McCarthy ... Laura Barnett
- Kyla Pratt ... Emily
- Nathan Hutchings ... Steve Barnett
- Allan Kayser ... Tony
