= Power 98 (film) =

- VHS cover
- Directed by: Jaime Hellman
- Written by: Jaime Hellman
- Produced by: Ram Bergman; Dana Lustig; Carole Curb Nemoy
- Starring: Eric Roberts; Jason Gedrick; Jennie Garth
- Cinematography: Kent L. Wakeford
- Edited by: Duane Hartzell
- Music by: Jeff Beal
- Production companies: WarnerVision Films; C.E.I.C. Productions; Bergman Lustig Productions
- Distributed by: Warner Home Video
- Release date: May 17, 1996 (United States)
- Running time: 89 minutes
- Country: United States
- Language: English

Power 98 is a 1996 low-budget American thriller film written and directed by Jaime Hellman.

== Plot ==
Karlin Pickett is a successful disc jockey working for KPHX. Because of his lack of shyness and boundaries, he gains a lot of fans and has no trouble with flirting with women. Vivian Porter, his latest date, accidentally falls to her death following a fight with him. Following the accident, he moves to Los Angeles, where he starts to work at a radio station called KOZY, owned by Rick Harris. There, he meets Jon Price, an aspiring disc jockey waiting for his big break. Jon is in a relationship with Sharon Penn, a young woman who is working as a lawyer. Soon, Karlin shocks his colleagues and audience with his sexual conversations on air. He befriends Jon and offers him a spot as his co-host.

Although Harris is not fond of their show, the ratings increase with huge amounts. Jon joins Karlin in partying all night and they come up with an idea to make people call and confess to big crimes to increase their ratings even more. When Jon finds out that Karlin is making his friends call the station to confess to crimes which were never committed, he feels that he is betraying his audience. They get into an argument, but Karlin eventually makes him promise to keep quiet, by promising him his own radio show. As they become very popular, Jon's new materialistic attitude irritates Sharon. When she finds out that he is cheating on her with a woman named Cynthia, she immediately leaves him.

Meanwhile, Jon finds out that the murder Karlin's friend talked about wasn't made up. Upon confronting Karlin, he immediately wants to confront the police, but Karlin threatens to tell that he was an accomplice if he does. Not much later, Karlin, who was actually the one who committed the murder that was described, poisons his next victim, Cynthia. It turns out that he made the calls to the radio station himself, which were recorded with a different voice. When Jon refuses to keep silent any longer, Karlin frames him for the murder. Trying to serve justice, Jon decides to immediately visit Karlin's friend, only to find Karlin.

Karlin tries to poison him with cyanide and, as Jon starts to react to the poisoning, admits that he planned everything that has happened. Not only does he admit to the murder of Vivian and Cynthia, but he also reveals his plans of making him look like Eddie, having falsely placed evidence in his house and making his death look like a suicide. However, it turns out that Jon didn't drink the bourbon containing the cyanide, and faked his cringing to get him to confess. When Karlin tries to shoot him, Jon reveals that he put a microphone on his body, and that all the listeners on the radio already heard his confession. A gun fight follows and Karlin is eventually shot and killed by the police. In the end, Jon resigns from the radio station and convinces Sharon to give him another chance.

== Cast ==
- Eric Roberts as Karlin Pickett
- Jason Gedrick as Jon Price
- Jennie Garth as Sharon Penn
- Stephen Tobolowsky as Rick Harris
- James Pickens, Jr. as Detective Wilkinson
- Larry Drake as Detective Dimetto
- Jim Fyfe as Roger Zalman
- Michael Mantell as Lester Correl
- Leonora Scelfo as Cynthia Berkley
- Kristin Dattilo as Betsy
- Lisa Thornhill as Vivian Porter
