= Diane Ladd =

American actress (1935–2025)

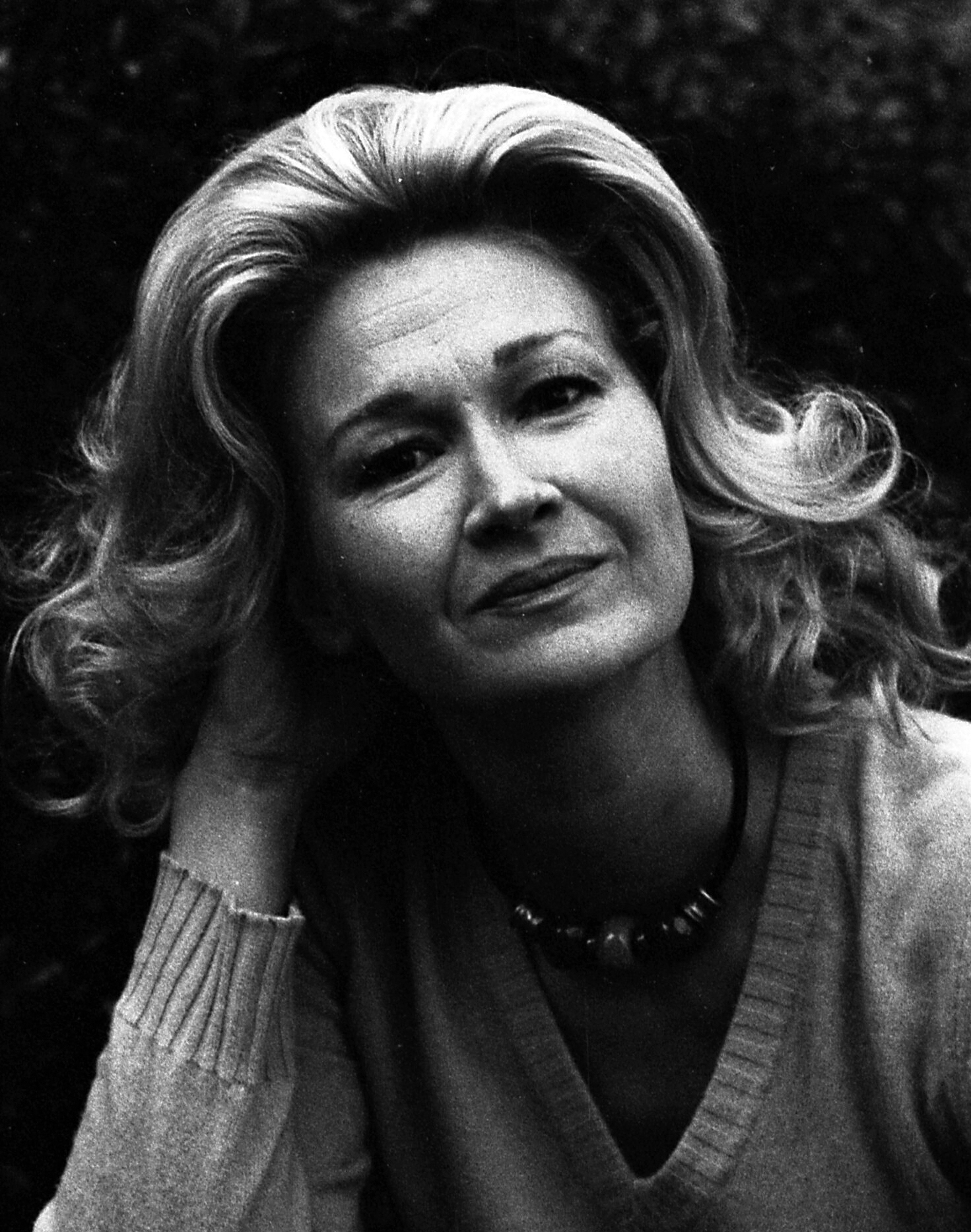
- Ladd in 1975
- Born: Rose Diane Ladner; November 29, 1935; Laurel, Mississippi, U.S.
- Died: November 3, 2025 (aged 89); Ojai, California, U.S.
- Occupation: Actress
- Years active: 1953–2022
- Spouses: Bruce Dern (m. 1960; div. 1969) William Shea Jr. (m. 1969; div. 1977) Robert Hunter (m. 1999; died 2025)
- Children: 2, including Laura Dern
- Website: dianeladd.com

Signature
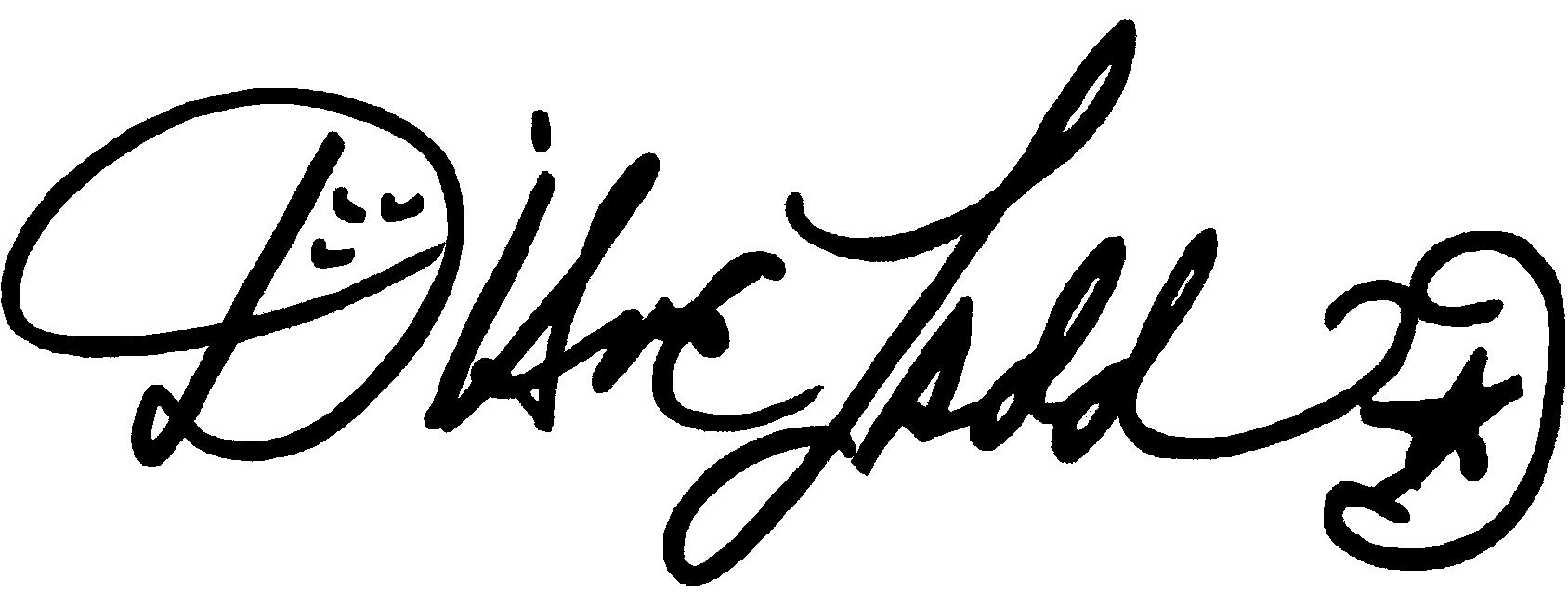

Diane Ladd (born Rose Diane Ladner; November 29, 1935 – November 3, 2025) was an American actress. With a career spanning over 70 years, she appeared in over 200 films and television shows, receiving three Academy Award nominations for her roles in Alice Doesn't Live Here Anymore (1974), Wild at Heart (1990) and Rambling Rose (1991), the first of which won her a BAFTA Award. She was also nominated for three Primetime Emmy Awards and four Golden Globe Awards, winning one for her role in the sitcom Alice (1980–1981).

Ladd's other film appearances included Chinatown (1974), National Lampoon's Christmas Vacation (1989), Ghosts of Mississippi (1996), Primary Colors (1998), 28 Days (2000) and Joy (2015). She was the mother of actress Laura Dern, with her ex-husband, actor Bruce Dern.

== Early life ==
Ladd was born Rose Diane Ladner, the only child of Mary Bernadette Ladner (née Anderson; 1912–2002), a housewife and actress, and Preston Paul Ladner (1906–1982), a veterinarian who sold products for poultry and livestock. She was born in Laurel, Mississippi, on November 29, 1935, while the family was visiting relatives for Thanksgiving, though they lived in Meridian, Mississippi. Ladd was related to playwright Tennessee Williams and poet Sidney Lanier. Ladd was raised in her mother's Roman Catholic faith.

== Career ==
In 1953, while living in New Orleans, Ladd was cast in a production of the Jack Kirkland play Tobacco Road, and later moved to New York City, where she acted on stage and screen.

Ladd met Bruce Dern in an off Broadway production of Orpheus Descending in 1960; during the course of the production they got married. Together they appeared in several films including The Wild Angels and The Rebel Rousers in the 1960s, Mrs. Munck in 1995, and American Cowslip in 2009.

In 1971, Ladd joined the cast of the CBS soap opera The Secret Storm. She was the second actress to play the role of Kitty Styles on the long-running daytime serial. She later had a supporting role in Roman Polanski's 1974 film Chinatown, and was nominated for an Academy Award for Best Actress in a Supporting Role for her role as Flo in the film Alice Doesn't Live Here Anymore. That film inspired the television series Alice, in which Flo was portrayed by Polly Holliday. When Holliday left the TV series, Ladd succeeded her as waitress Isabelle "Belle" Dupree.

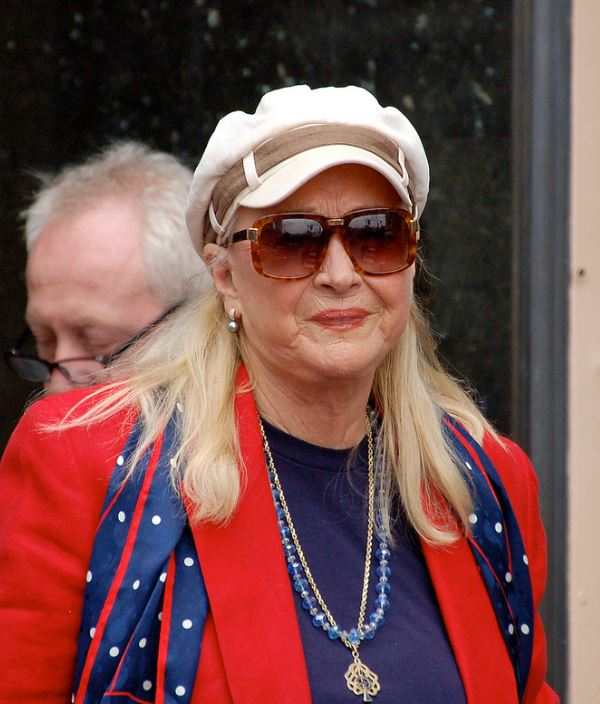
Ladd in 2013 at the Hollywood Walk of Fame to honor actress Olympia Dukakis

Her subsequent film appearances included Black Widow (1987), National Lampoon's Christmas Vacation (1989), Ghosts of Mississippi (1996), Primary Colors (1998), 28 Days (2000) and Joy (2015). She appeared in the independent screwball comedy Hold Me, Thrill Me, Kiss Me in 1992, where she played a flirty, aging Southern belle alongside her real mother, actress Mary Lanier.

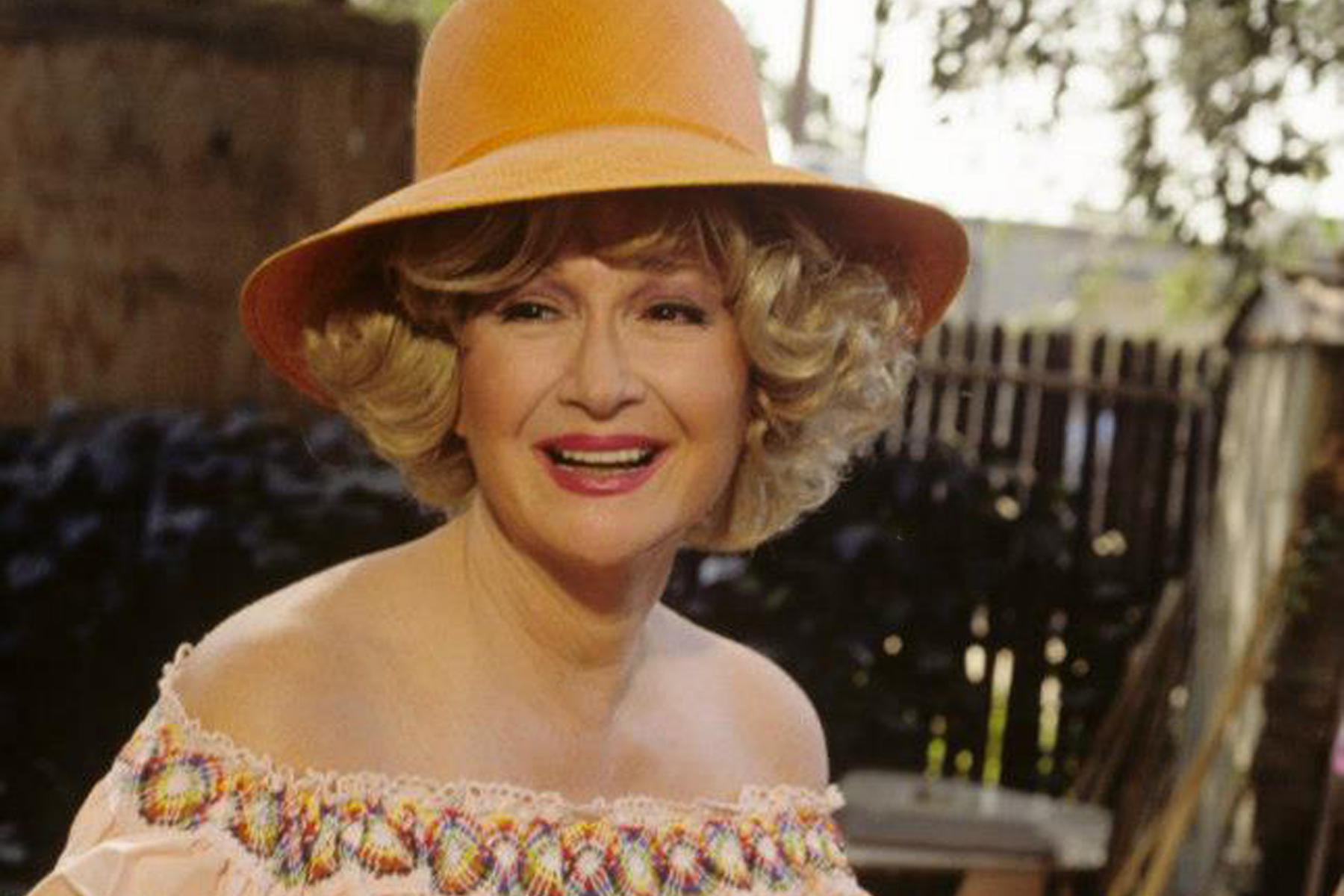
Ladd as Lucille in Hold Me, Thrill Me, Kiss Me

In 2004, Ladd played psychic Mrs. Druse in the television miniseries of Stephen King's Kingdom Hospital. In April 2006, Ladd released her first book, Spiraling Through The School of Life: A Mental, Physical, and Spiritual Discovery. In 2007, she co-starred in the Lifetime Television film Montana Sky.

In addition to her Academy Award nomination for Alice Doesn't Live Here Anymore, she was also nominated (again in the Best Actress in a Supporting Role category) for both Wild at Heart and Rambling Rose, in both of which she starred alongside her daughter Laura Dern. Dern received a nomination for Best Actress for Rambling Rose. The dual mother and daughter nominations for Ladd and Dern in Rambling Rose marked the first time in Academy Awards history that such an event had occurred. They were also nominated for dual Golden Globe Awards in the same year.

Ladd also worked in theatre. She made her Broadway debut in Carry Me Back to Morningside Heights in 1968. In 1976, she starred in A Texas Trilogy: Lu Ann Hampton Laverty Oberlander, for which she received a Drama Desk Award nomination.

On November 1, 2010, Ladd, Laura Dern and Bruce Dern received adjoining stars on the Hollywood Walk of Fame; this was the first time three members of the same family had been awarded stars on the Walk on the same occasion.

She starred in the Hallmark Channel series Chesapeake Shores.

Ladd's final two film roles were in Gigi & Nate and Isle of Hope, both from 2022.

== Personal life and death ==
Ladd was married to actor Bruce Dern from 1960 to 1969. They co-starred in two films, and had two daughters: Diane Elizabeth, who died at age eighteen months after a drowning accident, and Laura Elizabeth, who became an actress. Ladd and Laura Dern co-starred in the films Wild at Heart, Daddy and Them, Rambling Rose, Citizen Ruth and Inland Empire, and in the HBO series Enlightened. The two also appeared together in White Lightning and Alice Doesn't Live Here Anymore, although Laura was uncredited in both.

Ladd was married to William A. Shea Jr. from 1969 to 1977. She married again in 1999, to her third husband, Robert Charles Hunter. Hunter was at one point the CEO of PepsiCo Food Systems. He preceded her in death by three months, in August 2025.

Ladd was supportive of Jesse Jackson's 1988 presidential campaign.

In 2018, Ladd was misdiagnosed with pneumonia and given six months to a year to live after she inhaled "poison spray" from the farms neighboring her home, constricting her esophagus. Her daughter, Laura, transferred her to another hospital where she made a full recovery.

Ladd died from chronic hypoxic respiratory failure complicated by idiopathic pulmonary fibrosis at her home in Ojai, California on November 3, 2025 at the age of 89.

== Filmography ==
=== Film ===
Year	Title	Role	Notes
1961	Something Wild	Bit Part	Uncredited
1962	40 Pounds of Trouble	Young Bride on Honeymoon	Uncredited
1966	The Wild Angels	Gaysh	With Bruce Dern
1969	The Reivers	Phoebe	
1970	The Rebel Rousers	Karen	Shot in 1967
1970	Macho Callahan	Girl	
1970	WUSA	Barmaid at Railroad Station	Uncredited
1971	The Steagle	Mrs. Forbes	
1973	White Lightning	Maggie	Credited as Diane Lad
1974	Chinatown	Ida Sessions	
1974	Alice Doesn't Live Here Anymore	Florence Jean "Flo" Castleberry	
1976	Embryo	Martha Douglas	
1981	All Night Long	Helen Dupler	
1983	Something Wicked This Way Comes	Mrs. Nightshade	
1983	Sweetwater	Lucy	
1987	Black Widow	Etta	
1987	Plain Clothes	Jane Melway	
1989	National Lampoon's Christmas Vacation	Nora Griswold	
1990	Wild at Heart	Marietta Fortune	
1991	A Kiss Before Dying	Mrs. Corliss	
1991	Rambling Rose	Mrs. Hillyer	
1992	Hold Me, Thrill Me, Kiss Me	Lucille	
1992	Forever	Mabel Normand	
1992	Spies Inc.	Alice	
1993	The Cemetery Club	Lucille Rubin	
1993	Carnosaur	Dr. Jane Tiptree	
1993	Father Hood	Rita	
1995	Mother	Olivia Hendrix	Also co-producer
1995	Mrs. Munck	Mrs. Munck	Also writer and director
1995	Raging Angels	Sister Kate	
1996	Citizen Ruth	Ruth's Mother	Uncredited
1996	Ghosts of Mississippi	Grandma Caroline Moore	
1997	Get a Clue	Berthe Erica Crow	
1997	James Dean: Race with Destiny	Mama Pierangeli	
1998	Primary Colors	Mamma Stanton	
1998	Route 66		
1999	Can't Be Heaven	Nona Gina	
2000	28 Days	Bobbie Jean	
2000	The Law of Enclosures	Bea	
2001	Daddy and Them	Jewel	
2001	Rain	Audrey Turnquick	
2002	Redemption of the Ghost	Aunt Helen	
2002	More than Puppy Love	Aunt Edna	
2002	The Virgin		
2003	Charlie's War	Jobie	
2005	The World's Fastest Indian	Ada	
2006	Come Early Morning	Nana	
2006	When I Find the Ocean	Edna	
2006	Inland Empire	Marilyn Levens	
2008	Jake's Corner	Fran	
2008	American Cowslip	Roe	
2013	Grave Secrets	Emily Barnes	
2014	Just Before I Go	Mamma	Uncredited
2015	I Dream Too Much	Vera	
2015	Joy	Mimi	
2016	Sophie and the Rising Sun	Ruth Jeffers	
2016	Amerigeddon	Betty	
2016	Boonville Redemption	Grandma Mary	
2019	The Last Full Measure	Alice Pitsenbarger	
2020	Charlie's Christmas Wish	Nana	
2021	Charming the Hearts of Men	Alice Paul	Uncredited
2022	Gigi & Nate	Mama Blanche	
2022	Isle of Hope	Carmen Crawford	

=== Television ===
Year	Title	Role	Notes
1957	Decoy	Selma Richmond	Episode: "Two Days to Kill"
1958	The Big Story	Vera	Episode: "The Small of Death"
1958	The Walter Winchell File	Lois	Episode: "A Thing of Beauty: File #29"
1958–1959	Naked City	Kathie Mills / Yankee Cretias	2 episodes
1959	Deadline	Judy	Episode: "Victor Reisel"
1961	The Detectives	Gloria Tyler	Episode: "Act of God"
1963	Wide Country	Alma Prewitt	Episode: "Step Over the Sky"
1963	Armstrong Circle Theatre	Charlotte Cable	Episode: "The Counterfeit League"
1963	77 Sunset Strip	Helen Saunders	Episode: "The Left Field Caper"
1963	Perry Mason	Miss Frances	Episode: "The Case of the Shifty Shoebox"
1963	Mr. Novak	Mrs. Otis	Episode: "I Don't Even Live Here"
1963	Hazel	Sharlene	Episode: "George's 32nd Cousin"
1964	The Fugitive	Stella	Episode: "Come Watch Me Die"
1964	The Great Adventure	Annie Thompson	Episode: "Rodger Young"
1964	Bob Hope Presents the Chrysler Theatre	Cissy	Episode: "The Game with Glass Pieces"
1964–1967	Gunsmoke	Bonnie Mae Haley / Lulu / Elena Kerlin	3 episodes
1966	Daniel Boone	Ronda Cameron	Episode: "Seminole Territory"
1966	Shane	Amy Sloate	Episode: "The Distant Bell"
1967	The Big Valley	Muriel Akely	Episode: "Boy into Man"
1968	Ironside	Peggy Barnard	Episode: "Robert Phillips vs. the Man"
1969	Then Came Bronson	Valerie Faber	Episode: "Old Tigers Never Die--They Just Run Away"
1971–1972	The Secret Storm	Kitty Styles #2	Unknown episodes
1973	The Devil's Daughter	Alice Shaw	TV movie
1975	Movin' On	Amy	Episode: "General Delivery"
1976	City of Angels	Laura	Episode: "The November Plan: Part 1"
1976	Addie and the King of Hearts	Irene Davis	TV movie
1977	The November Plan	Laura Taylor	TV movie
1978	Black Beauty	Amelia Gordon	Miniseries
1978	Thaddeus Rose and Eddie	Carlotta	TV movie
1979	Willa	Mae	TV movie
1980	Guyana Tragedy: The Story of Jim Jones	Lynette Jones	TV movie
1980–1981	Alice	Belle Dupree	22 episodes
1980–1985	The Love Boat	Christa Johanson / Bernice Bronson / Ruby Gibson	3 episodes
1982	Desperate Lives	Carol Cameron	TV movie
1983	Grace Kelly	Margaret Kelly	TV movie
1983	Faerie Tale Theatre	Mother	Episode: "Little Red Riding Hood"
1984	I Married a Centerfold	Jeanette Bryan	TV movie
1985	Crime of Innocence	Rose Hayward	TV movie
1987	Celebration Family	Mrs. Heflin	TV movie
1988	Bluegrass	Verna Howland	TV movie
1989	Father Dowling Mysteries	Arlene	Episode: "The Face in the Mirror Mystery"
1989	Heartland	Marjorie	Episode: "B.L. Moves Out"
1990	Rock Hudson	Kay	TV movie
1990	In the Heat of the Night	Maybelle Cheseboro	Episode: "Home Is Where the Heart Is"
1990	The Lookalike	Mary Helen Needam	TV movie
1991	Shadow of a Doubt	Emma	TV movie
1992	Middle Ages	Bebe Cooper	Episode: "Forever Young"
1993	L.A. Law	Celeste Bauman	Episode: "Cold Shower"
1993	Harts of the West	Alison's Mom	Episode: "Guess Who's Coming to Chow?"
1993	Sisters	Belle Adderly	Episode: "The Best Intentions"
1993	Dr. Quinn, Medicine Woman	Charlotte Cooper	2 episodes
1994–1997	Grace Under Fire	Louise Burdette	2 episodes
1994	Hush Little Baby	Edie	TV movie
1994	The Gift	Evie	TV short
1996	The Siege at Ruby Ridge	Irma Coulter	TV movie
1996	Cold Lazarus	Martina Masdon	Miniseries; 3 episodes
1997	Breach of Faith: A Family of Cops 2	Aunt Shelly Fein	TV movie
1997	Touched by an Angel	Carolyn Sellers	Episode: "An Angel by Any Other Name"
1997	Get a Clue	Berthe Erica Crow	TV movie
1998	The Staircase	Sister Margaret	TV movie
2000	Best Actress	Herself	TV movie
2000	Sharing the Secret	Nina's Mother	TV movie
2000	Strong Medicine	Annabelle Lee Stowe	2 episodes
2000	Christy: Return to Cutter Gap	Alice Henderson	TV movie
2001	Christy, Choices of the Heart	Alice Henderson	2 episodes
2002	Living with the Dead	Regina Van Praagh	TV movie
2002	Damaged Care	Mary "Rhodie" Rhodes	TV movie
2003	Aftermath	Mother	TV movie
2004	Gracie's Choice	Louela Lawson	TV movie
2004	Kingdom Hospital	Sally Druse	13 episodes
2005	Cold Case	Zelda Amatuzzi (2005)	Episode: "Committed"
2006	ER	Mrs. Pooler	Episode: "No Place to Hide"
2007	Montana Sky	Bess	TV movie
2008	Mayerthorpe	Roszko's Mother	TV movie
2011–2013	Enlightened	Helen Jellicoe	16 episodes
2012	Deadtime Stories	Barnsey	Episode: "Grave Secrets"
2016	Ray Donovan	Motel Lady	Episode: "Federal Boobie Inspector"
2016–2022	Chesapeake Shores	Nell O'Brien	43 episodes
2018	Christmas Lost and Found	Grandma Frances	TV movie
2021	Young Sheldon	Hortense	Episode: "The Geezer Bus and a New Model for Education"

== Awards and nominations ==
Year	Award	Category	Nominated work	Results	Ref.
1974	Academy Awards	Best Supporting Actress	Alice Doesn't Live Here Anymore	Nominated	
1990	Academy Awards	Best Supporting Actress	Wild at Heart	Nominated	
1991	Academy Awards	Best Supporting Actress	Rambling Rose	Nominated	
2015	AARP Movies for Grownups Awards	Best Supporting Actress	Joy	Won	
1975	British Academy Film Awards	Best Actress in a Supporting Role	Alice Doesn't Live Here Anymore	Won	
1991	Chicago Film Critics Association Awards	Best Supporting Actress	Rambling Rose	Nominated	
1977	Drama Desk Awards	Outstanding Actress in a Play	A Texas Trilogy: Lu Ann Hampton Laverty Oberlander	Nominated	
1974	Golden Globe Awards	Best Supporting Actress – Motion Picture	Alice Doesn't Live Here Anymore	Nominated	
1980	Golden Globe Awards	Best Supporting Actress – Series, Miniseries or Television Film	Alice	Won (Note: Tied with Valerie Bertinelli for One Day at a Time.)	
1990	Golden Globe Awards	Best Supporting Actress – Motion Picture	Wild at Heart	Nominated	
1991	Golden Globe Awards	Best Supporting Actress – Motion Picture	Rambling Rose	Nominated	
1991	Independent Spirit Awards	Best Supporting Female	Rambling Rose	Won	
1974	New York Film Critics Circle Awards	Best Supporting Actress	Alice Doesn't Live Here Anymore	Nominated	
1993	Primetime Emmy Awards	Outstanding Guest Actress in a Drama Series	Dr. Quinn, Medicine Woman (Episode: "Pilot")	Nominated	
1994	Primetime Emmy Awards	Outstanding Guest Actress in a Comedy Series	Grace Under Fire (Episode: "Things Left Undone")	Nominated	
1997	Primetime Emmy Awards	Outstanding Guest Actress in a Drama Series	Touched by an Angel (Episode: "An Angel by Any Other Name")	Nominated	

== Books ==
- Ladd, Diane (2006). Spiraling Through the School of Life: A Mental, Physical, And Spiritual Discovery. Hay House Inc. ISBN 978-1-401-90719-8.
- Ladd, Diane (2016). A Bad Afternoon for a Piece of Cake. Exxcell Press. ISBN 978-0-981-79206-4.
- Dern, Laura; Ladd, Diane (2023). Honey, Baby, Mine: A Mother and Daughter Talk Life, Death, Love (and Banana Pudding). Grand Central Publishing. ISBN 978-1-538-72037-0.
