= 8th Independent Spirit Awards =

US film awards ceremony in 1993

- Date: March 27, 1993
- Site: Santa Monica, California, U.S.
- Hosted by: Buck Henry

Highlights
- Best Film: The Player
- Most awards: The Waterdance (2)
- Most nominations: Gas Food Lodging (5); One False Move (5)

The 8th Independent Spirit Awards, honoring the best in independent filmmaking for 1992, were announced on March 27, 1993. It was hosted by Buck Henry and was the first ceremony held under a tent on the beach in Santa Monica.

== Nominees and winners ==
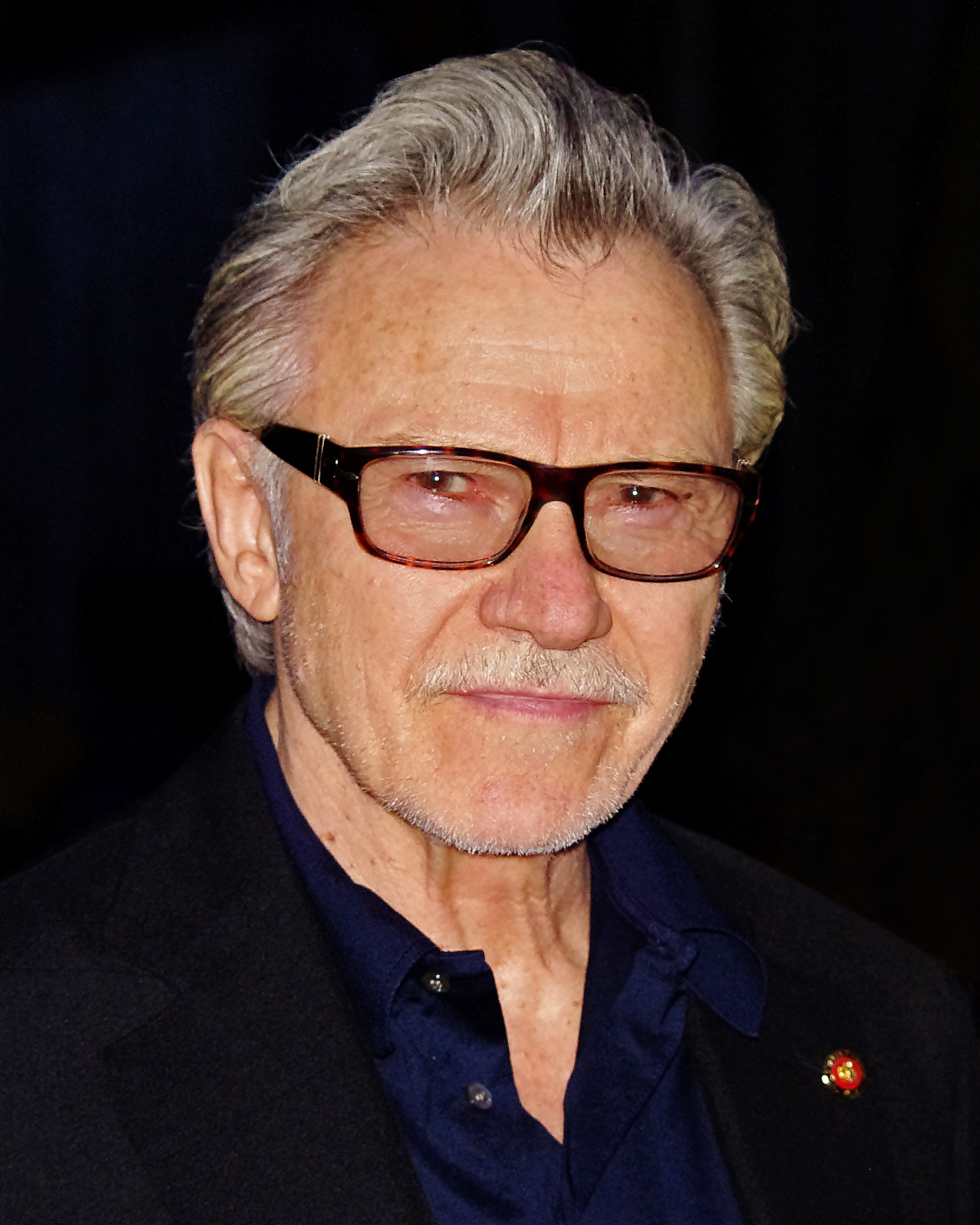
Harvey Keitel, Best Male Lead winner

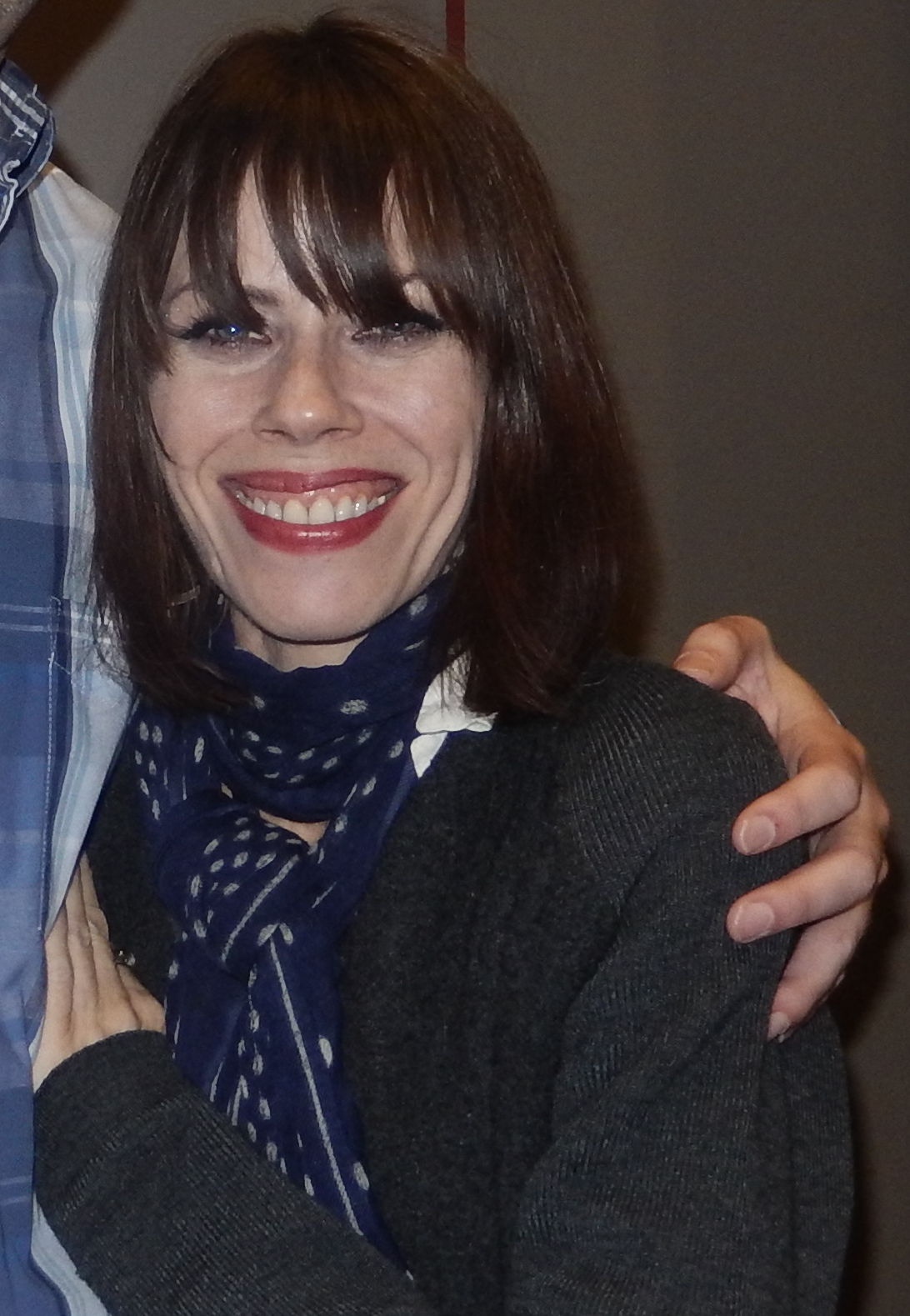
Fairuza Balk, Best Female Lead winner

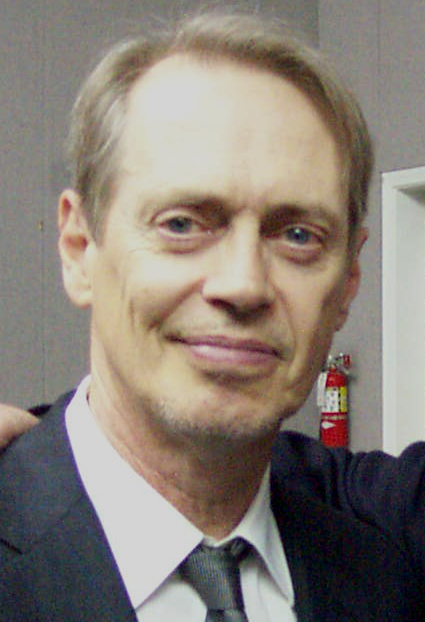
Steve Buscemi, Best Supporting Male winner

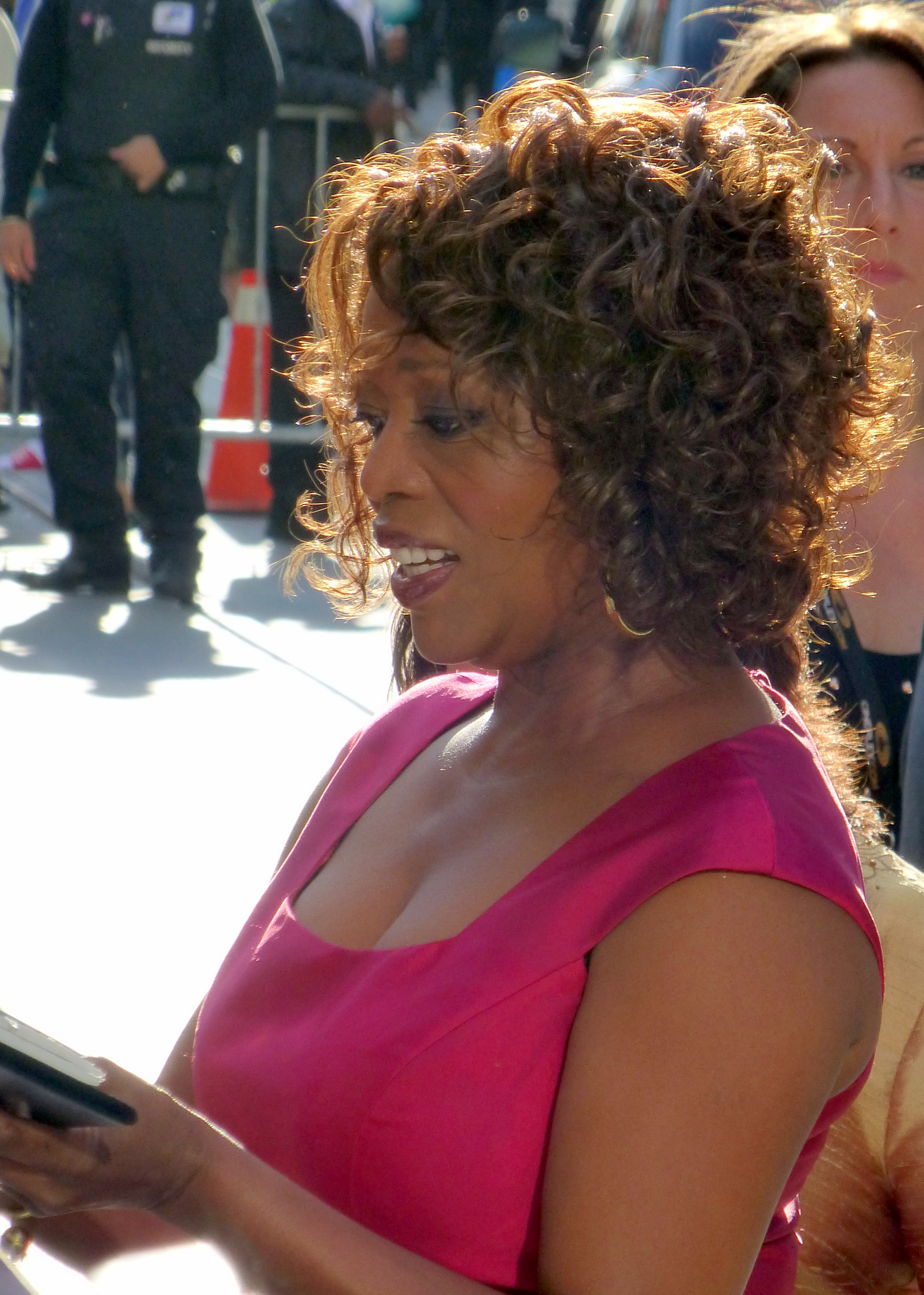
Alfre Woodard, Best Supporting Female winner

Best Feature	Best Director
The Player: Bad Lieutenant; Gas Food Lodging; Mississippi Masala; One False Move	Carl Franklin – One False Move: Allison Anders – Gas Food Lodging; Abel Ferrara – Bad Lieutenant; Tom Kalin – Swoon; Quentin Tarantino – Reservoir Dogs
Best Male Lead	Best Female Lead
Harvey Keitel – Bad Lieutenant: Craig Chester – Swoon; Laurence Fishburne – Deep Cover; Peter Greene – Laws of Gravity; Michael Rapaport – Zebrahead	Fairuza Balk – Gas Food Lodging: Edie Falco – Laws of Gravity; Catherine Keener – Johnny Suede; Sheryl Lee – Twin Peaks: Fire Walk with Me; Cynda Williams – One False Move
Best Supporting Male	Best Supporting Female
Steve Buscemi – Reservoir Dogs: William Forsythe – The Waterdance; Jeff Goldblum – Deep Cover; Wesley Snipes – The Waterdance; David Strathairn – Passion Fish	Alfre Woodard – Passion Fish: Brooke Adams – Gas Food Lodging; Sara Gilbert – Poison Ivy; Karen Sillas – Simple Men; Danitra Vance – Jumpin' at the Boneyard
Best Screenplay	Best First Feature
The Waterdance – Neal Jimenez: Gas Food Lodging – Allison Anders; Light Sleeper – Paul Schrader; A Midnight Clear – Keith Gordon; One False Move – Billy Bob Thornton, Tom Epperson	The Waterdance – Neal Jimenez and Michael Steinberg: Laws of Gravity; My New Gun; Reservoir Dogs - Quentin Tarantino; Swoon
Best Cinematography	Best Original Score
Night on Earth – Frederick Elmes: All the Vermeers in New York – Jon Jost; Laws of Gravity – Jean de Segonzac; Light Sleeper – Edward Lachman; Swoon – Ellen Kuras	Twin Peaks: Fire Walk with Me – Angelo Badalamenti: All the Vermeers in New York – Jon A. English; One False Move – Terry Plumeri, Peter Haycock and Derek Holt; The Tune – Maureen McElheron; Zebrahead – Taj Mahal
Best International Film
The Crying Game • UK: Close to Eden • Soviet Union; Danzón • Mexico/Spain; Howards End • UK; Raise the Red Lantern • China/Hong Kong/Taiwan

=== Films that received multiple nominations ===
Nominations	Film
5	Gas Food Lodging
5	One False Move
4	Laws of Gravity
4	Swoon
4	The Waterdance
3	Bad Lieutenant
3	Reservoir Dogs
2	All the Vermeers in New York
2	Deep Cover
2	Light Sleeper
2	Passion Fish
2	Twin Peaks: Fire Walk with Me
2	Zebrahead

=== Films that won multiple awards ===
Awards	Film
2	The Waterdance
