= One False Move =

1992 film by Carl Franklin

- Theatrical release poster
- Directed by: Carl Franklin
- Written by: Billy Bob Thornton; Tom Epperson
- Produced by: Jesse Beaton; Ben Myron
- Starring: Bill Paxton; Cynda Williams; Billy Bob Thornton; Michael Beach; Earl Billings; Jim Metzler
- Cinematography: James L. Carter
- Edited by: Carole Kravetz
- Music by: Terry Plumeri; Peter Haycock; Derek Holt
- Production company: I.R.S. Media
- Distributed by: I.R.S. Media
- Release date: May 8, 1992
- Running time: 105 minutes
- Country: United States
- Language: English
- Budget: $2.5 million
- Box office: $1.5 million

One False Move is a 1992 American Southern noir crime thriller film directed by Carl Franklin, written by Billy Bob Thornton and Tom Epperson, and starring Thornton, Bill Paxton, Cynda Williams, Michael Beach, and Jim Metzler. The film is about a trio of criminals from Los Angeles who are hunted by the police chief of a rural Arkansas town they take refuge in after a killing spree across the United States.

Produced independently on a low-budget of $2.5 million and financed by record label I.R.S., the film was originally intended for a direct-to-video release but became popular through word of mouth, convincing the distributor to give the film a theatrical release. It was Thornton's first film as screenwriter, as well as his first starring role. It is considered as Franklin's breakthrough project as a director.

Despite poor commercial performance, the film received widespread critical acclaim and appeared in several critics' end-of-year best-of lists. Carl Franklin won the Los Angeles Film Critics Association's New Generation Award. At the 8th Independent Spirit Awards, Franklin won Best Director and the film was nominated in four other categories, including Best Film.

== Plot ==
Three criminals, Ray, Pluto and Fantasia (Ray's girlfriend), commit six brutal murders over the course of one night in Los Angeles as they seek a cache of money and cocaine. The trio leave for Houston to sell the cocaine to a friend of Pluto's.

Los Angeles Police Department (LAPD) detectives Dud Cole and John McFeely are investigating the case. After getting a few leads, they discover that the three are possibly headed for Star City, Arkansas from a recovered home video tape. The LAPD contacts the Star City Police Chief, Dale "Hurricane" Dixon, who is excited about the case, as it gives him an opportunity to do "some real police work". He is well-known throughout the rural community, chatting with locals while on patrol. The detectives arrive in Star City and meet Dale. He attempts to ingratiate himself with the detectives, whom he reveres, who pretend to respect him while secretly mocking his country lifestyle.

After stopping at a convenience store in Texas, a state trooper pulls over and attempts to arrest Ray and Pluto, but Fantasia kills him as she is asked to get out of the car. Word of the trooper's murder gets to the detectives in Star City, and the trio review surveillance photos of Ray and Fantasia in the store confirming their identity. Dale informs the detectives that Fantasia's real name is Lila Walker, a native of Star City. He recalls she was a troubled youth who left for Hollywood with dreams of an acting career.

The detectives sense Dale may know Fantasia better than he is letting on after they stop by her mother's house. They question Fantasia's mother and brother Ronnie about Fantasia's whereabouts and if she had contacted them recently. They also meet a young boy, Byron, who is revealed to be Lila's young son. The detectives suspect that Lila will be coming home to see him.

Ray, Fantasia and Pluto arrive in Houston to sell the drugs as planned. Fantasia takes a bus to Star City. Angry that their buyers are reneging on the previously agreed upon price for the cocaine, Pluto and Ray kill them and flee. They drive to Star City to meet up with Fantasia and plan their next move.

When Fantasia arrives in Star City, she hides at a rural house. Dale confronts her, and it is revealed that the boy is Dale and Lila's son, conceived during an affair years earlier. After tense conversation, they make a deal: Lila will lure Ray and Pluto to ensure their arrest and in exchange, Dale will help her leave town.

Pluto and Ray arrive at the house and are immediately confronted by the armed police chief. Lila distracts Dale, allowing Pluto to stab him in the stomach, during which Dale manages to shoot Pluto. Ray draws his gun and runs outside while shooting at Dale. The two fire at each other, but Fantasia stops Dale from killing Ray, only to have Ray errantly shoot her in the head, killing her. Seriously wounded, Dale steadies himself and shoots Ray to death. Pluto walks outside and falls dead in the grass. Dale calls for help with his police radio, and the LAPD detectives arrive, amazed at what the chief has accomplished. Byron walks over and talks to Dale as he lies bleeding, and he asks the boy to tell him about himself.

== Cast ==
Credits from the AFI Catalog of Feature Films:

- Bill Paxton as Dale "Hurricane" Dixon
- Cynda Williams as Lila "Fantasia" Walker
- Billy Bob Thornton as Ray Malcolm
- Michael Beach as Lane "Pluto" Franklin
- Earl Billings as John McFeely
- Jim Metzler as Dud Cole
- Natalie Canerday as Cheryl Ann
- Robert Ginnaven as Charlie
- Robert Anthony Bell as Byron
- Kevin Hunter as Ronnie
- Jimmy Bridges as Bobby
- John Mahon as Chief Jenkins
- Walter Norman as Arkansas State Trooper

== Production ==
Carl Franklin, who was transitioning from a career as an actor, attracted the attention of producers Jesse Beaton and Ben Myron with his American Film Institute thesis film, Punk. Beaton and Myron, who owned the rights to One False Move, were impressed by Franklin’s “maturity” and his understanding of the film’s subtexts of race relations, the conflicts between city and country life and gender issues. Financing for the film came from I.R.S. Records.

While set in Star City, Arkansas, the majority of the film was shot in Brinkley and Cotton Plant beginning in October 1990. Second unit photography was performed by Janusz Kamiński. Filming also took place in Los Angeles and Pearlblossom in California. Production wrapped in May 1991, but due to distribution issues the film didn't premiere for another year.

Cynda Williams and Billy Bob Thornton eloped during production, they remained together until 1992.

=== Music ===
The score for the film was written by Climax Blues Band members Pete Haycock and Derek Holt, with orchestral music by Terry Plumeri. The film also features three songs by the duo Mike & Brenda Sutton.

== Distribution and release ==
I.R.S. Records originally had a straight-to-video distribution deal with Columbia TriStar Entertainment, believing the film's lack of name stars would hurt any theatrical release. However, following rave reviews from critics like Sheila Benson and Roger Ebert, the film was given theatrical distribution.

== Reception ==
=== Box office ===
In the United States and Canada, One False Move grossed $1.5 million at the box office against a budget of $2.5 million.

=== Critical response ===
On the review aggregator website Rotten Tomatoes, 93% of 57 critics' reviews are positive, with an average rating of 8.5/10. The website's consensus reads: "One False Move makes nary a misstep as it unfurls a seedy caper with hard-hitting action and sly humor, marking an arresting debut for director Carl Franklin." Metacritic, which uses a weighted average, assigned the film a score of 87 out of 100, based on 20 critics, indicating "universal acclaim".

Writing for The Washington Post, Hal Hinson praised the film: "One False Move is a thriller with a hair-trigger sense of tension. Directed by newcomer Carl Franklin, its power comes from the stripped-down simplicity of its style and the unblinking savagery of its violence." Film critic Roger Ebert praised the film's director in his review: "It is a powerful directing job. He starts with an extraordinary screenplay and then finds the right tones and moods for every scene, realizing it's not the plot we care about, it’s the people." At year end, film critic Gene Siskel voted the film as his favorite of 1992.

In a retrospective essay for The Criterion Collection, author William Michael Boyle writes:

"One False Move is many things. A stunning nineties neonoir [sic]. A tragedy. A movie that says more about race and class without being didactic than many others that try hard to say something. A road picture. A lovers-on-the-run tale. A flawless encapsulation of the desperate energy and desperate deeds that fuel real crime. It feels timeless. It’s a structural marvel. A study in tension and pacing. Having moved from Brooklyn to Mississippi over a decade ago, I feel like I understand the film in ways now that I couldn’t have previously. It’s a complex portrait of the South. The awful weight of history and tradition. Kindness often masking complicity. Buried secrets. The atmosphere misted over with sins of the past. Attempts to smile through pain and yearning. Cycles of poverty and grief and near escape. Dark humor."

== Accolades ==
=== Awards and nominations ===
Year	Institution	Category	Nominee(s)	Result
1992	Deauville American Film Festival	Critics' Award	Carl Franklin	Nominated
1992	Los Angeles Film Critics Association	New Generation Award	Carl Franklin	Won
1993	Chicago Film Critics Association	Most Promising Actress	Cynda Williams	Nominated
1993	Fantasporto	Best Film	Carl Franklin	Nominated
1993	Fantasporto	Best Screenplay	Billy Bob Thornton, Tom Epperson	Won
1993	Festival du Film Policier de Cognac	Grand Prix	Carl Franklin	Won
1993	Festival du Film Policier de Cognac	Critics' Award	Carl Franklin	Won
1993	Film Independent Spirit Awards	Best Film	Ben Myron	Nominated
1993	Film Independent Spirit Awards	Best Director	Carl Franklin	Won
1993	Film Independent Spirit Awards	Best Screenplay	Billy Bob Thornton, Tom Epperson	Nominated
1993	Film Independent Spirit Awards	Best Female Lead	Cynda Williams	Nominated
1993	Film Independent Spirit Awards	Best Original Score	Terry Plumeri, Pete Haycock, Derek Holt	Nominated
1993	MTV Movie & TV Awards	Best New Filmmaker	Carl Franklin	Won
1994	Belgian Syndicate of Cinema Critics	Grand Prix	Carl Franklin	Nominated

=== Best-of lists ===
==== National Board of Review ====
- Top Ten Films (1992)
