= Danyi =

Danyi may refer to:

- Danyi Prefecture, a prefecture of Togo
- Danyi Deats (born 1967), American actor and producer
- Gábor Danyi (born 1964), Hungarian handball player
