= Travis Bean =

American luthier

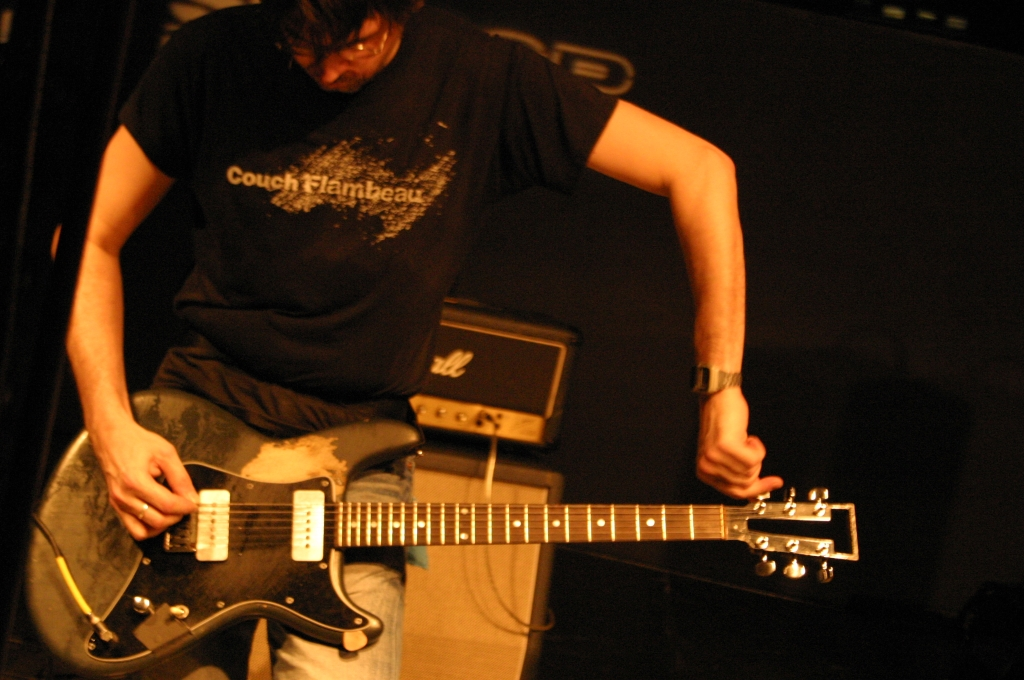
Steve Albini tuning a TB500 onstage.

Clifford Travis Bean (21 August 1947 – 10 July 2011, aged 63) was an American luthier and machinist from California.

In 1974, he partnered with Marc McElwee and Gary Kramer to start Travis Bean Guitars, which made high-end electric guitars and basses featuring machined aluminum necks. This was an unusual design, shared by Veleno guitars, departing from the more traditional use of wood. The aluminum center section ran through the instrument body, with the pickups directly mounted to the aluminum. The majority of these instruments featured solid koa wood bodies and humbucker pickups. Though praised for their sound, the aluminum necks made Travis Bean guitars heavier than other electric guitars. Models included the Artist, Standard, Wedge (rare), and TB500 (rare) with single coil pickups.

Kramer and Bean parted ways in 1975, with the former starting Kramer Guitars. The first series of Kramer guitars were redesigned aluminum-necked instruments but utilizing wooden inserts along the back of the neck to cut down on weight and provide a more traditional feel; these modifications also avoided patent infringement of Travis Bean's original neck design.

Around 3,600 guitars and basses were produced between 1974 and 1979.

In the late 1990s, Bean teamed with master machinist/designer B. Kelly Condon and produced a run of 24 high end, custom instruments. These guitars and basses were aluminum-neck instruments, each machined from a 125-pound billet of 7075 aluminum. The pans weighed just over 4 pounds when finished and all were serial numbered and identified inside the pan.

== Models ==
- TB500 (Bass) – 1 produced
- TB500 (Budget Model) – 351 produced
- TB1000S (Standard) – 1422 produced
- TB1000A (Artist) – 755 produced
- TB2000 (Standard Bass) – 1020 produced
- TB3000 (Wedge) – 45 produced
- TB4000 (Wedge Bass) – 36 produced

== Players ==
=== Guitarists ===
- Steve Albini of Shellac – played a TB500 and TB3000 "Wedge"
- Steve Pedersen of Criteria – plays a TB1000S.
- Matthew Bolger of The Redneck Manifesto – plays TB1000S & TB1000A
- John Congleton record producer plays and owns many Travis Bean guitars
- Duane Denison of The Jesus Lizard – played TB1000S (Sea Foam Green)
- Roger Fisher of Heart – played TB1000A
- Ace Frehley – Played a black TB1000S in the '75 KISS ALIVE era.
- Vincent Gallo played a TB500, TB1000S, TB1000A and TB3000 "Wedge" model
- Jerry Garcia – played TB1000A and TB500
- John Haughm of Agalloch – plays TB1000S (natural koa) and TB1000A (black)
- Rubberduck Jones, a Finnish punk rock guitarist, who is most well known as the guitarist of several Pelle Miljoona related bands, like Pelle Miljoona & 1980 and the Suspenders.
- Stanley Jordan – plays TB1000S
- Alex Kane of AntiProduct, on the recommendation of bandmate Nino Del Pesco, was asked by Travis to test an early guitar prototype during a gig at the Garage. It was the first, and possibly only, time a guitar from the new run was played during a live performance.
- Greg Lake
- Keith Levene of Public Image Ltd – played Wedge and TB1000S
- John MacLean of Six Finger Satellite
- Stephen Malkmus of Pavement owns a TB1000A
- Efrim Menuck
- Ceylon Mooney of Pezz
- Eddie Rivas of Leopold and Distorted Pony plays a koa TB1000A and a magnolia TB1000S
- Colin Newman of Wire played a TB1000A during the mid-1980s.
- Josh Newton of Shiner plays a TB1000S and TB1000A
- Rick Nielsen – Played a red and black TB1000S. Both pictured in his book Guitars of The Stars.
- Stephen O'Malley of Sunn O))) plays TB1000S
- Buzz Osborne of Melvins
- Joe Perry – played Wedge and TB1000S (black and silver)
- Yannis Philippakis of Foals uses a TB1000S (natural and black) and black TB500
- Lee Ranaldo of Sonic Youth – played TB1000A (several were stolen in July 1999) Also played TB1000S "bullseye" (which was destroyed) and TB1000S
- Keith Richards – played a TB1000 on the Rolling Stones 1975 tour and a custom made 5-string TB1000A during the 1979 New Barbarians tour. Used a black TB500 during the Rolling Stones 1978 Saturday Night Live performance.
- Brian Robertson played a TB1000A during his time with Thin Lizzy
- Billy Rowe Jetboy
- Kelly Ryall played a TB1000 during early High Pass Filter shows.
- Ty Segall plays a TB1000S and a TB1000A
- Kevin DeFranco of Super Unison plays a TB1000A
- Garry Shider of Parliament Funkadelic
- Frank Iero of My Chemical Romance. TB1000A
- Slash plays a TB1000S live with Guns N' Roses on the song "Bad Obsession".
- Ronnie Wood – played a TB2000 on the Rolling Stones 1975 tour, a TB1000A and a white TB500 during the 1979 New Barbarians tour.
- Milić Vukašinović of Vatreni Poljubac during whole career.
- Rich Zoran of Bacchus Lotus played TB1000A in the early 1980s.
- David Lebón of Seru Giran (Argentine rock supergroup) played a TB1000S, natural finish
- Johan Folkesson of Swedish sludge/doom band Switchblade plays TB1000S'
- John Mayer played a Black TB1000A at various times during the 2019 Fall Fun Run tour with Dead & Company.
- Hoff plays a pair of Koa TB1000S's for touring and recording with Upchuck.

=== Bassists ===
- Liam Andrews of My Disco plays a TB2000.
- Emidio Clementi of Massimo Volume
- Nino Del Pesco of AntiProduct worked with Travis Bean and B. Kelly Condon in the 1990s, testing the bass prototypes during the new run. Nino also played the first bass prototype on one song during an AntiProduct gig at the Garage (now the Virgil). It was the first, and possibly only, time a bass from the new run was played during a live performance.
- Johnny Docherty of The Twilight Sad plays a Travis Bean
- Rose Marshack of Poster Children plays a Travis Bean TB2000
- Peggy Foster, The Runaways, Steve Vai, TB4000 Wedge Bass #25, TB2000 Fretless #248
- Chosei Funahara of Plasmatics – played two of black TB4000 Wedges #5 and #31
- Vincent Gallo played a TB500 bass, TB2000 and a TB4000 Wedge bass.
- Matt Gentling of Archers of Loaf plays a TB2000.
- Bruce Hauser of Touch, Stepson & Honeymoon played a Flamed Koa TB2000 1977 – 1978. It was a gift from Marc McElwee and later stolen when Bruce's home was burgled.
- Mick Karn of Japan – played a fretless TB2000 serial number 002
- Alan Lancaster of Status Quo
- Bill Laswell 1976 TB2000 {Band} Sonor Eclipes
- Tim Midyett of Bottomless Pit and Silkworm – plays TB4000 Wedge. During Silkworm, Tim played a TB1000S modified to baritone and TB2000.
- Burke Shelley of Budgie plays a TB2000 occasionally.
- Bob Weston of Shellac and the Volcano Suns
- Bill Wyman of The Rolling Stones – Wyman used a custom made short-scale TB2000 from 1977 until 1986. A total of 4 short-scale TB2000 basses were made for Wyman.
- Anders Steen, formerly a member of Swedish sludge/doom band Switchblade played TB2000's
- John Kahn of Jerry Garcia Band.

== See also ==
- Frying pan (guitar) – The first aluminum neck guitar, 1930s
- Veleno (guitar) – another maker of aluminum neck guitars
