= Mo' Better Blues (soundtrack) =

1990 soundtrack album

Music from Mo' Better Blues

Soundtrack album to Mo' Better Blues by Branford Marsalis Quartet featuring Terence Blanchard
- Released: July 31, 1990
- Studios: RCA (New York City); Sound on Sound (New York City)
- Genre: Jazz
- Length: 37:35
- Label: Columbia
- Producers: Bill Lee; Delfeayo Marsalis; DJ Premier; Raymond Jones

Spike Lee film soundtracks chronology
Do the Right Thing: Original Motion Picture Soundtrack (1989)	Music from Mo' Better Blues (1990)	Music from the Movie "Jungle Fever" (1991)

Branford Marsalis albums chronology
Crazy People Music (1990)	Music From "Mo' Better Blues" (1990)	The Beautyful Ones Are Not Yet Born (1991)

Terence Blanchard albums chronology
Black Pearl (1988)	Music From "Mo' Better Blues" (1990)	Terence Blanchard (1991)

Singles from Music From "Mo' Better Blues"
- 1. "Jazz Thing" Released: August 8, 1990

Professional ratings
Review scores
Source	Rating
AllMusic	3/5 stars

Music From "Mo' Better Blues" is a collaborative album by Branford Marsalis Quartet and Terence Blanchard. It was released in 1990 through Columbia/CBS Records as a soundtrack to Spike Lee's 1990 film Mo' Better Blues. The recording sessions took place at RCA Studios and Sound on Sound in New York. The album was produced by Bill Lee, Delfeayo Marsalis, Raymond Jones and DJ Premier, with Spike Lee serving as executive producer. It features contributions from film stars Cynda Williams, Denzel Washington and Wesley Snipes, and American hip hop duo Gang Starr.

The album peaked at number 63 on the US Billboard 200 albums chart. Music video was released for a single "Jazz Thing". In 1991, the soundtrack received a nomination for a Soul Train Music Award for Best Jazz Album, while the song "Again Never" was nominated for a Grammy Award for Best Jazz Instrumental Performance, Group at the 33rd Annual Grammy Awards.

Bill Lee's diegetic score featuring the Natural Spiritual Orchestra, was finally released in 2026, as an MOD CD by Elastic Stage: https://elasticstage.com/newversionmusic/releases/mo-better-blues-original-score-album

== Accolades ==
Accolades for Music From "Mo' Better Blues"
Publication	Accolade	Rank	Ref.
Albumism	100 Greatest Soundtracks of All Time	—N/a	
Complex	The 50 Greatest Movie Soundtracks of All Time	—N/a	
Consequence of Sound	The 100 Greatest Movie Soundtracks of All Time	80	
The Boombox	20 Great Hip-Hop/Jazz Albums of the '90s	—N/a	
Vulture	The 40 Greatest Movie Soundtracks of All Time	23	

== Track listing ==
No.	Title	Writer(s)	Producer(s)	Length
1.	"Harlem Blues" (featuring Cynda Williams)	William Christopher Handy	Raymond Jones	4:50
2.	"Say Hey"	Branford Marsalis	Delfeayo Marsalis	3:18
3.	"Knocked Out the Box"	B. Marsalis	Delfeayo Marsalis	1:35
4.	"Again, Never"	William James Edwards Lee III	Bill Lee	3:54
5.	"Mo' Better Blues"	Lee III	Bill Lee	3:39
6.	"Pop Top 40" (featuring Denzel Washington and Wesley Snipes)	B. Marsalis; Shelton Jackson Lee	Delfeayo Marsalis	5:40
7.	"Beneath the Underdog"	B. Marsalis	Delfeayo Marsalis	5:07
8.	"Jazz Thing" (featuring Gang Starr)	Keith Elam; Christopher Martin; B. Marsalis; Lolis Eric Elie	DJ Premier; Branford Marsalis (co.)	4:50
9.	"Harlem Blues (Acapulco Version)" (featuring Cynda Williams)	Handy	Raymond Jones	4:48
Total length:				37:35

== Personnel ==
- Branford Marsalis – soprano and tenor saxophone, co-producer (track 8)
- Kenny Kirkland – piano
- Robert Hurst – bass
- Jeff "Tain" Watts – drums
- Terence Blanchard – trumpet
- Cynda Williams – backing vocals (track 1), alto vocals (track 9)
- Denzel Washington – vocals (track 6)
- Wesley Snipes – vocals (track 6)
- Keith "GuRu" Elam – rap vocals (track 8)
- B. David Whitworth – backing vocals (track 8)
- Mark Ledford – backing vocals (track 8)
- Tawatha Agee – backing vocals (track 8)
- Brooklyn Crooks – chorus shouts vocals (track 8)
- Clare Fischer – string arrangement and conductor (tracks: 1, 9)
- Peter Hunstein – programming (track 8)
- Raymond Jones – producer (tracks: 1, 9)
- Delfeayo Marsalis – producer (tracks: 2, 3, 6, 7)
- William "Bill" Lee III – producer (tracks: 4, 5)
- Chris "DJ Premier" Martin – producer (track 8)
- Larry DeCarmine – recording (tracks: 1, 9)
- Larry Ferguson – mixing (tracks: 1, 9)
- Patrick Smith – recording and mixing (tracks: 2–7)
- Rob Hunter – recording and mixing (track 8)
- Shelton Jackson "Spike" Lee – executive producer
- Ken Kochman – design

== Charts ==
Chart (1990)	Peak position
US Billboard 200	63
US Top R&B/Hip-Hop Albums (Billboard)	21
US Traditional Jazz Albums (Billboard)	1
