= I Love You (Climax Blues Band song) =

- British single picture sleeve

Single by Climax Blues Band

from the album Flying the Flag
- B-side: "Horizontalized"
- Released: February 14, 1981
- Genre: Soft rock
- Length: 4:01
- Label: Warner Bros. Records
- Songwriter: Derek Holt
- Producer: John Ryan

Climax Blues Band singles chronology
| "Gotta Have More Love" (1980) | "I Love You" (1981) | "Darlin'" (1981) |

"I Love You" is a song by the Climax Blues Band, released as a single in 1981, from the album Flying the Flag.

== Chart performance ==
The song was the group's second-biggest hit (after 1976's "Couldn't Get It Right"), entering the U.S. Billboard Hot 100 in February 1981, peaking at No. 12 in June, and spending 27 weeks on the chart, and also reached No. 20 on the Adult Contemporary chart.

"I Love You" was the 20th biggest hit of 1981. On the Cash Box Top 100, "I Love You" peaked for two weeks at number 9.

=== Weekly charts ===
| Chart (1981) | Peak position |
|---|---|
| Australian (Kent Music Report) | 59 |
| Canada Top Singles (RPM) | 14 |
| Canada Adult Contemporary (RPM) | 30 |
| U.S. Billboard Hot 100 | 12 |
| U.S. Billboard Adult Contemporary | 20 |
| U.S. Cash Box Top 100 | 9 |

=== Year-end charts ===
| Chart (1981) | Position |
|---|---|
| U.S. Billboard Hot 100 | 20 |
| U.S. Cash Box | 46 |

== Credits ==
Nicky Hopkins played grand piano throughout the whole song; string arrangements were provided by David Campbell.

== Other versions ==
"I Love You" song was covered by American band Lazlo Bane for their 2007 album Guilty Pleasures.

It was covered by the band Nine Days for the soundtrack album to the film The New Guy, and by the band Tesla for their 2011 acoustic album Twisted Wires & the Acoustic Sessions.

"I Love You" was also covered by the band the H Factor, and was released as a single, from their 1989 sole eponymous album. Two members of the H Factor, Pete Haycock and Derek Holt, were members of the Climax Blues Band before forming the H Factor with Steve Hunter. Holt also recorded his own version of the song on the 1999 album After the Climax - I Love You.

== In popular culture ==
The song is featured at the end scene of the 2002 Robin Tunney indie-comedy film Cherish.

The song is featured in the closing credits of the 2008 Kevin Smith comedy film Zac and Miri Make a Porno.
