= Gold Plated =

Studio album by Climax Blues Band
- Released: October 1976
- Recorded: April – May 1976, August 1976 (track 5)
- Studio: Chipping Norton Studios (except track 5: Air Studios)
- Genre: Blues rock; soft rock; soul
- Length: 31:27
- Label: BTM; RCA; Sire
- Producer: Mike Vernon; Climax Blues Band

Climax Blues Band chronology
Stamp Album (1975)	Gold Plated (1976)	Shine On (1978)

Professional ratings
Review scores
Source	Rating
AllMusic	3/5 stars

Gold Plated is a 1976 album by the Climax Blues Band. It made No. 56 on the UK Albums Chart and No. 27 on the Billboard Album Chart, becoming their highest-selling album in either region. It also featured their hit "Couldn't Get It Right".

== Track listing ==
The album was produced by Mike Vernon. All songs were written by the Climax Blues Band.

No.	Title	Length
1.	"Together and Free"	3:52
2.	"Mighty Fire"	4:50
3.	"Chasing Change"	4:19
4.	"Berlin Blues"	3:28
5.	"Couldn't Get It Right"	3:18
6.	"Rollin' Home"	3:12
7.	"Sav'ry Gravy"	4:54
8.	"Extra"	3:34
Total length:		31:27

== Personnel ==
Climax Blues Band

- Colin "Thunderguts" Cooper – saxophones, vocals (3, 5, 7), rhythm guitar
- Pete Haycock – lead guitar, vocals (1, 2, 4, 6, 7, 8), 6-string bass
- Richard Jones – keyboards, vocals, guitar
- Derek Holt – Fender Jazz and Fender Precision basses, vocals
- John Cuffley – drums, percussion
