= River's Edge =

1986 film by Tim Hunter

- Theatrical release poster
- Directed by: Tim Hunter
- Written by: Neal Jimenez
- Produced by: Sarah Pillsbury; Midge Sanford
- Starring: Crispin Glover; Keanu Reeves; Ione Skye; Roxana Zal; Daniel Roebuck; Joshua Miller; Dennis Hopper
- Cinematography: Frederick Elmes
- Edited by: Howard E. Smith; Sonya Sones
- Music by: Jürgen Knieper
- Color process: Metrocolor
- Production company: Hemdale Film Corporation
- Distributed by: Island Pictures
- Release dates: September 10, 1986 (TIFF); May 8, 1987 (U.S.)
- Running time: 99 minutes
- Country: United States
- Language: English
- Budget: $1.7 million
- Box office: $4.6 million

River's Edge is a 1986 American crime drama film directed by Tim Hunter, written by Neal Jimenez, and starring Crispin Glover, Keanu Reeves, Ione Skye in her film debut (her sole credit as Ione Skye Leitch), Daniel Roebuck, and Dennis Hopper. It follows a group of teenagers in a Northern California town who are forced to deal with their friend's murder of his girlfriend and the subsequent disposal of her body. Jimenez partially based the script on the 1981 murder of Marcy Renee Conrad in Milpitas, California.

Shot in Los Angeles in 1986, the film premiered that year at the Toronto International Film Festival before Island Pictures purchased it for distribution, theatrically releasing it in the United States in May 1987. Several critics praised the film's performances, and its subject matter resulted in several critics classifying it as a contemporary horror film. It was awarded Best Picture at the 1986 Independent Spirit Awards.

Contemporary film scholars have noted River's Edge as an example of the "killer kid" film, as well as one of the most polarizing youth-oriented films of the 1980s. In a 2015 retrospective, Salon deemed it "the darkest teen film of all time." The film has an original score by Jürgen Knieper, as well as a soundtrack featuring songs from various punk and metal bands, including Slayer, Fates Warning, Agent Orange, and the Wipers.

== Plot ==
In Northern California, as pre-teen Tim throws his sister's doll into a river, he sees a teenager, John, smoking on the other side, next to the naked corpse of his girlfriend Jamie. Shortly after, Tim is playing an arcade game at a convenience store where he sees John being refused the sale of beer for being underage. While John is arguing with the cashier, Tim steals two cans of Olde English 800. John leaves the store and when he goes to start his car he notices Tim has placed the beer cans on his front seat. Tim accompanies John on a trip to purchase marijuana. Tim returns home, where his older brother Matt and mother are searching for the doll. Matt's friend Layne arrives, and the two drive to meet Feck, a disturbed ex-biker and drug dealer who has isolated himself from society due to being wanted for murder. They buy marijuana from him. On the way, Layne recounts a party from the night before, where John and Jamie were arguing.

At school, Layne and Matt smoke with their friends Clarissa, Maggie, and Tony. Matt talks about wanting to run away to Portland, which Clarissa dismisses. John arrives and says he killed Jamie. Clarissa and Maggie leave for class, thinking he's joking. John brings Layne and Matt to see Jamie's body; Matt is disturbed, while Layne is focused on covering up the crime.

The group go see Jamie's body, with Layne's older brother Mike driving them there in his truck. Later, Clarissa calls Matt, but he is reluctant to talk to her. Meanwhile, Layne returns to the scene and pushes Jamie's body into the river. After noticing police cars near John's house, they drive to Feck's house, where John stays to hide out. Matt directs the police to the river, where they find Jamie's body. The police interrogate him, threatening to charge him as an accessory after the fact. Matt returns home and argues with his mother and her boyfriend. When he sees that Tim has defaced the grave marker for her lost doll that their sister made, Matt hits Tim in the face. Tim goes to his friend Moko's house and they go to Feck's to obtain a gun.

In the middle of the night, Layne, Clarissa and Matt drive to Tony's house, but Tony's father chases them off with a shotgun. Layne argues with Clarissa and kicks her out of his car. Matt gets out and walks with her. They stop at a convenience store and run into John and Feck. Tim and Moko break into Feck's house looking for a gun, but instead find his marijuana, which they use to get stoned and pass out. Matt and Clarissa talk in the park, where they discuss their conflicting feelings of grief and apathy over Jamie's murder. John and Feck go to the river's edge to drink, with Feck bringing along his blow-up doll, Ellie. Feck confesses to murdering his own girlfriend years earlier, despite having deeply loved her. John drunkenly brags about killing Jamie, recounting his strangling of her with a relish that disturbs Feck. Matt and Clarissa have sex in the park nearby, then fall asleep. Layne drives around town in a panic, compulsively taking pills.

At dawn, after John falls asleep on the riverbank, Feck shoots him in the head. He returns home, where Tim and Moko knock him out and steal his gun. The police find Layne and bring him in for questioning. At school, reporters interview Maggie and Tony, who seem dispassionate. The police arrest Feck in his house. The teenagers go to the river together. Matt admits to Layne he told the police that John murdered Jamie. Layne runs off and finds John's body. Tim arrives and points Feck's gun at Matt, threatening to kill Matt for hitting him the night before, but Matt dissuades him.

The police arrive and escort the teenagers and Tim away. In the hospital, Feck admits to killing John "because there was no hope for him," and confesses to murdering his girlfriend. Matt, Clarissa, Tony, and Maggie attend Jamie's funeral, where they show emotion at seeing her for the last time.

== Cast ==
- Crispin Glover as Layne
- Keanu Reeves as Matt
- Ione Skye as Clarissa (credited as Ione Skye Leitch)
- Roxana Zal as Maggie
- Daniel Roebuck as Samson "John" Tollet
- Joshua John Miller as Tim (credited as Joshua Miller)
- Tom Bower as Detective Bennett
- Constance Forslund as Madeleine
- Leo Rossi as Jim
- Phil Brock as Mike
- Josh Richman as Tony
- Dennis Hopper as Feck
- Danyi Deats as Jamie

== Themes ==
Film scholar Emanuel Levy writes that the film "addresses the alienation and moral vacancy among American kids growing up in a drug-oriented, valueless culture. River's Edge has the disturbing quality of a collective fear—the cherished, eagerly awaited adolescence is presented as confusing and vacuous. Unlike most 1980s teenage sex comedies, this film doesn't glamorize youth, instead depicting it as a bleak, aimless coming of age, a time of boredom, stupor, and waste." But Levy writes that the film does share with its peers the manner in which it presents adult figures as "irresponsible and indifferent."

== Production ==
=== Conception ===
While the screenplay is fiction, it draws from the November 3, 1981, murder of Marcy Renee Conrad, who was raped and strangled by Anthony Jacques Broussard in Milpitas, California. Broussard bragged about the crime, showing the body to at least 13 different people; despite this, the crime went unreported for two days. Screenwriter Neal Jimenez was taking screenwriting courses at the University of California, Los Angeles at the time of Conrad's murder, and said he based the script partially on the event. He said, "the incident is merely the inspiration for the screenplay." Others have noticed similarities between the film and the 1984 murder of Gary Lauwers by his friend Ricky Kasso.

Hemdale Film Corporation expressed interest in Jimenez's script, and agreed to distribute the film with Tim Hunter directing. Producer Midge Sanford recalled: "Hemdale were a small company that made some very good movies, like Salvador and Hoosiers. They really responded to the script and said they would finance it with Tim as the director." The film was in pre-production for four months, with a final budget of $1.7 million.

=== Casting ===
River's Edge was the first major film for many of its actors, including Roebuck and Skye. Of casting Reeves, casting director Carrie Frazier recalled: "He walked in the door, and I went, 'Oh my god, this is my guy!' It was just because of the way he held his body—his shoes were untied, and what he was wearing looked like a young person growing into being a man. I was over the moon about him."

Ione Skye was cast in the film after a casting director saw a photo of her with her brother, Donovan Leitch, an aspiring actor at the time; she had no acting experience, and it was her first film. Auditioning for the role of the brutish John, Roebuck arrived at his audition in full costume, with his hair slicked back with K-Y Jelly and two beer cans in his front pockets. The casting director saw Danyi Deats in the waiting room, while she was waiting for her best friend who was auditioning for the same role.

For the part of Feck, director Hunter had wanted John Lithgow; the part was also offered to Harry Dean Stanton, who declined, and passed the script on to his friend Dennis Hopper, who was cast. According to Producer Midge Sanford, Crispin Glover auditioned "with a wig and an outrageous take on the part. He was so out there that Sarah and I were a little nervous about what he was doing. But we trusted him and felt like it would work out in the end." Corey Haim was cast as Tim, but developed pneumonia during the first several days of filming and was replaced by Joshua John Miller.

=== Filming ===
Hunter originally wanted to shoot the film in Los Angeles, but instead opted to shoot near Sacramento because it had natural locations more conducive to the screenplay. The crew arrived to shoot scenes along the American River, but were forced to leave due to a major flood. Hunter settled on shooting the film in Sunland-Tujunga, Los Angeles, a community in the foothills above Burbank. Filming took place from January to March 1986. Hunter said, "It was an area where people with tuberculosis could come to sanatoriums for the clean air. By the time we shot River's Edge, it had become a smog pocket—but it was full of river rock houses that gave it a 'land that time forgot' feeling."

== Release ==
The film premiered at the Toronto International Film Festival on September 10, 1986. Producer Midge Sanford recalled the screening leaving the audience divided: "Some executives from a small distribution company wouldn't look at us [after a festival screening]. People either embraced it or were very put off by it. It didn't get picked up right away." The film was ultimately purchased for distribution by Island Pictures, which released it in the U.S. on May 8, 1987.

=== Home media ===
River's Edge was released on VHS in 1987 by Embassy Home Entertainment. MGM Home Entertainment released River's Edge on DVD on January 23, 2001 as part of their Avant-Garde Cinema line.

Kino Lorber released the film for the first time on Blu-ray in the United States on January 13, 2016. Sandpiper Pictures reissued the film on Blu-ray on December 17, 2024.

== Reception ==
=== Box office ===
River's Edge grossed $4.6 million at the United States box office.

=== Critical response ===
River's Edge received largely positive reviews from critics. It holds an 88% approval rating on Rotten Tomatoes based on 42 reviews with the consensus: "A harrowing tale of aimless youth, River's Edge generates considerable tension and urgency thanks to strong performances from a stellar cast including Crispin Glover, Keanu Reeves and Ione Skye." Metacritic gave the film a score of 73 based on 19 reviews, indicating "generally favorable reviews". At the time of its release, several critics considered it a contemporary horror film.

Gene Siskel ranked River's Edge the seventh-best film of 1987, while Roger Ebert awarded the film three-and-a-half out of four stars, calling it "the best analytical film about a crime since The Onion Field and In Cold Blood." Michael Wilmington of the Los Angeles Times called the film "a contemporary horror story about teen-agers, but it contains no slasher scenes or serial homicides. Its monsters are all too real." The New York Times's Janet Maslin called it "bitter and disturbing" and deemed the performances "natural and credible." Vincent Canby, also of The New York Times, named the film "the year's most riveting, most frightening horror film, even if doesn't really belong in the same category with any acknowledged classics of the genre. Metaphysics has nothing to do with River's Edge, though, like Dracula, it's a tale of the undead." David Ansen of Newsweek called the film "the scariest vision of youth since the alarming Brazilian movie Pixote... River's Edge pitches the audience inside this nightmare world of affectless middle-class kids and lets us watch them wallow their way through moral dilemmas they can only half articulate." John Simon of the National Review called River's Edge "splendid". By contrast, Pauline Kael of The New Yorker criticized the film's portrayal of adult characters as "cartoon figures", which had the effect of "[reinforcing] the self-pity of the adolescents and the audience's love of pathos."

In a 2015 retrospective, Salon deemed River's Edge "the darkest teen film of all time." Film historian Kim Newman named the film "the definitive killer kid movie... Moral without moralizing, blackly comic without tastelessness, [and] acutely tuned in to the way dead-end teens talk."

== Soundtrack ==
The film's soundtrack, released in 1987 by Enigma Records, features various thrash metal, punk, and a reggae track.

No.	Title	Artist(s)	Length
1.	"Lethal Tendencies"	Hallows Eve	6:35
2.	"Die By The Sword"	Slayer	3:35
3.	"Kyrie Elieson"	Fates Warning	5:27
4.	"Captor of Sin"	Slayer	3:27
5.	"Evil Has No Boundaries"	Slayer	3:09
6.	"Fire in the Rain"	Agent Orange	3:19
7.	"Tormentor"	Slayer	3:44
8.	"Let Me Know"	Wipers	3:00
9.	"Happy Day"	Burning Spear	3:51
Total length:			36:07

"Let Me Know" appeared at the request of Dennis Hopper.

== See also ==
- List of American films of 1986

== Sources ==
- Lebeau, Vicky (1991). "'You're My Friend': River's Edge and Social Spectatorship". Camera Obscura. 25–6: 251–72.
- Levy, Emanuel (1999). Cinema of Outsiders: The Rise of American Independent Film. New York University Press. ISBN 978-0-814-75289-0.
- Newman, Kim (2011). Nightmare Movies: Horror on Screen Since the 1960s (Revised ed.). London, England: Bloomsbury. ISBN 978-1-408-80503-9.
- Pfeil, Fred (1990). "The Flâneur at River's Edge; or, a Cruise of the Strip". Another Tale to Tell: Politics and Narrative in Postmodern Culture. Verso. ISBN 978-0-860-91992-6.
- Simon, John (2005). John Simon on Film: Criticism 1982-2001. Essex, Connecticut: Applause Books. p. 326. ISBN 978-1557835079.
