= William Michael Boyle =

American author (born 1978)

William Boyle
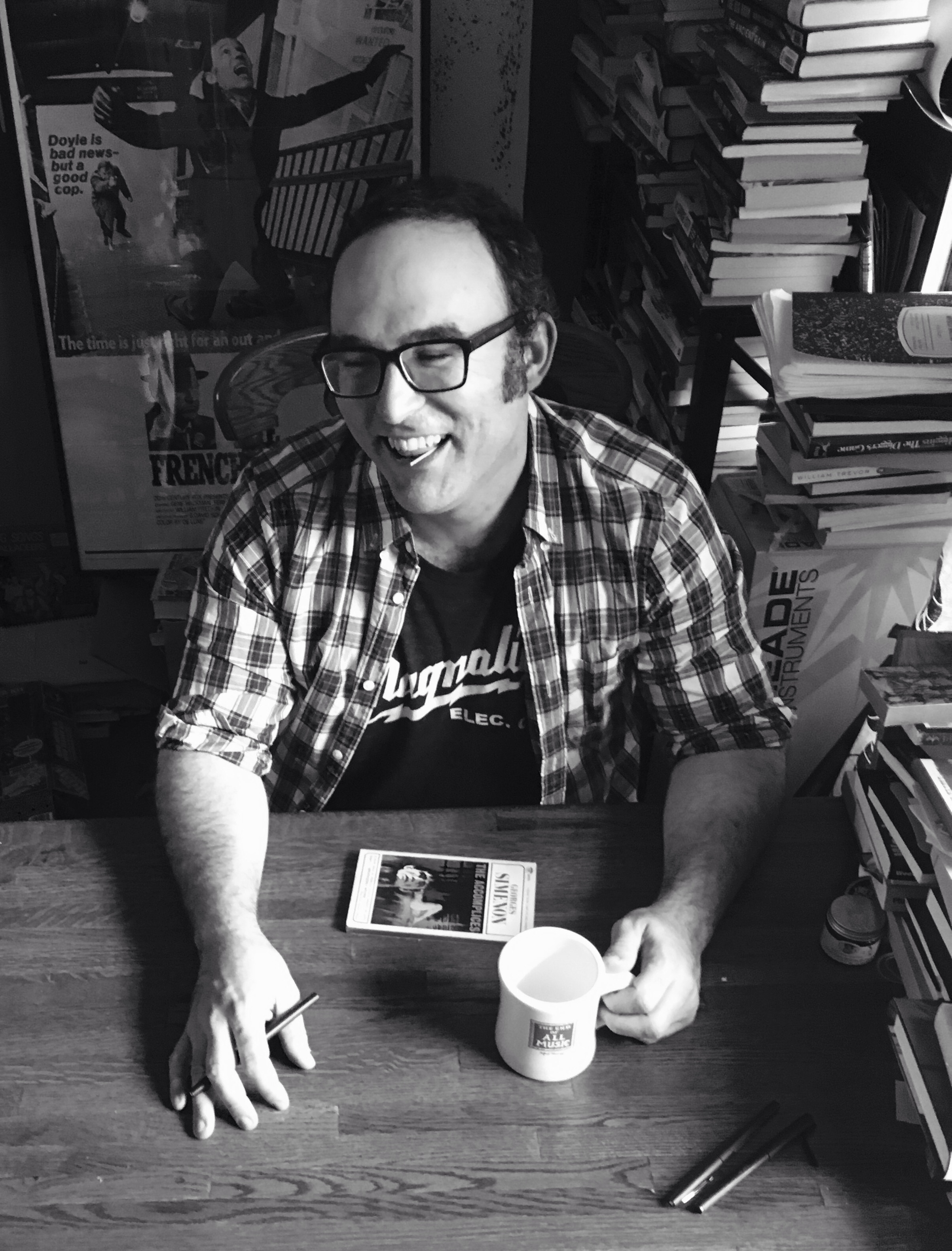
- Boyle in 2017
- Born: 1978 (age 47–48); New York City, U.S.
- Education: Xaverian High School; State University of New York at New Paltz (BA, MA); University of Mississippi (MFA)
- Occupation: Author
- Spouse: Katie Farrell
- Children: 2
- Writing career
- Genre: Crime fiction
- Website: williammichaelboyle.com

William Michael Boyle (born 1978) is an American author of character-driven literary crime fiction. Boyle is a native of Brooklyn, New York and the borough forms the backdrop for much of his work.

== Early life and education ==
Boyle lived with his mother's family in the southern Brooklyn neighborhoods of Gravesend and Bensonhurst. His mother's family was Italian. His father’s side of the family was Scottish. His father was absent for much of his childhood.

Boyle had 12 years of Catholic education, which included Xaverian High School in Bay Ridge.

Boyle earned his B.A. degree in English from the State University of New York at New Paltz. He also obtained an M.A. in English from SUNY-New Paltz. In 2011, he received an M.F.A. degree from the University of Mississippi.

== Style and themes ==
When Boyle's debut novel, Gravesend, was reissued, the longtime crime fiction reviewer of the New York Times, Marilyn Stasio, noted Boyle's use of local dialect.

In its review of The Lonely Witness, Publishers Weekly noted the gritty realism of Boyle's Brooklyn milieu.

Boyle's Catholic faith and upbringing in southern Brooklyn parishes are an integral element of his writing. Catholic images such as statuary abound.

New Orleans Review examined the variety of themes that inform Boyle's approach to crime fiction in its discussion of his short-story collection, Death Don't Have No Mercy.

On the cover of the U.K. edition of Boyle's 2019 comic crime caper, A Friend Is a Gift You Give Yourself, Roddy Doyle singled out the strength and humor of the female characters.

In reviewing Boyle's 2020 novel City of Margins—set almost entirely in southern Brooklyn—Stasio focused on his character studies, which featured "a mixture of affection and despair worthy of a Bruce Springsteen song."

Boyle's latest novel, Shoot the Moonlight Out (2021), drew its title from a Garland Jeffreys song. Once again, the action takes place almost entirely in southern Brooklyn. The Washington Post noted that Boyle "tries to write about how bad people can do good things and good people can do bad things."

== Comparisons to other notable authors ==
A U.K. review of Gravesend from The Guardian cited the book's idiomatic dialogue and blue-collar setting, drawing a parallel with Elmore Leonard.

Looking at the Death Don't Have No Mercy anthology, the Clarion-Ledger, a leading newspaper in Boyle's adopted home state of Mississippi, touched on the commonality of Boyle's work with Southern forebears Flannery O'Connor and William Gay.

France's oldest daily newspaper, Le Figaro, compared Boyle to Dennis Lehane and George Pelecanos, among others.

== Personal life and work outside of writing ==
Boyle moved to Oxford, Mississippi in 2008 as he pursued his M.F.A. He lives there with his wife Katie (née Farrell). They have one son and one daughter.

Boyle became an Adjunct Instructor in Writing and Rhetoric at the University of Mississippi in Oxford in January 2012. His title is now Instructor. He has also worked at The End of All Music, a noted music store in Oxford.

== Awards and honors ==
Gravesend was nominated among foreign authors for France's Grand Prix de Littérature Policière in 2016. In addition, it was one of five finalists in the novel category for the Prix SNCF du Polar. The French news weekly L'Express also cited it as one of the 10 best crime novels of that year.

The U.K. has also recognized Gravesend. It was shortlisted for the John Creasey CWA New Blood Dagger in 2018.

The Lonely Witness was nominated for the Hammett Prize in 2018. It also earned Boyle's second nomination for the Grand Prix de Littérature Policière in 2019.

In 2023, Boyle earned a third nomination for the Grand Prix de Littérature Policière with Shoot the Moonlight Out.

== Published works ==
Boyle is the author of the following novels:

- Gravesend (originally published in 2013, French-language edition published in 2016, reissued in the U.S. in 2018): ISBN 978-1681778495
- Tout Est Brisé, or Everything Is Broken (2017; released initially only in French but subsequently published in English in four parts by Southwest Review, Volume 104, issues 1-4): ISBN 978-2351781616
- The Lonely Witness (2018): ISBN 978-1681777955
- A Friend Is a Gift You Give Yourself (2019): ISBN 978-1643130583
- City of Margins (2020): ISBN 978-1643133188
- Shoot the Moonlight Out (2021): ISBN 978-1643138251

He has also written short stories:

- A collection entitled Death Don’t Have No Mercy (2015): ISBN 978-1940885193
- "Something Bad Happened to a Clown," which appeared in Lawyers, Guns, and Money: Crime Fiction Inspired by the Music of Warren Zevon (2022): ISBN 978-1643962665
- "New York Blues Redux," which appeared in The Best American Mystery and Suspense 2023: ISBN 978-0063315815

Other writing:

- Lock Things Up, an essay for The Criterion Collection about One False Move
- "Screwball Noir: A Personal History"
