= Ben Myron =

American film producer

Ben Myron is a film producer. His sixteen credits range from low-budget independent films (One False Move, Signal 7) to big-budget studio films (Cheaper by the Dozen, Cheaper by the Dozen 2).

== Career ==
He began his career in the film industry as an exhibitor. He owned and operated a 14-screen chain of theatres in the San Francisco Bay Area from the mid-1970s to the mid-1980s.

=== 1980s ===
In 1985, he produced Rob Nilsson's landmark independent film, Signal 7, which premiered at that year's Telluride Film Festival. The film was the first feature shot on video and successfully transferred to 35 mm. Francis Ford Coppola executive-produced the film. In 1987, he produced Checking Out, a comedy directed by David Leland (Wish You Were Here), starring Jeff Daniels. Warner Bros. released it in 1988. In 1989, Myron and director Roland Joffe started a production company called Lightmotive. Myron was president until early 1992. Films made during Myron's tenure include City of Joy, Super Mario Bros., and The Education of Little Tree.

=== 1990s ===
In 1992, Myron produced One False Move, directed by Carl Franklin and written by Myron’s friend, Billy Bob Thornton. Both Roger Ebert and Gene Siskel named the film the Best Film Of The Year. In 1999, One False Move was chosen by the N.Y. Times as One Of The Best 1000 Movies Ever Made. He left Lightmotive in 1992 to oversee the release of One False Move and to return to producing. Myron’s next project was the infamous Showgirls, written by Joe Eszterhas and directed by Paul Verhoeven, the team responsible for Basic Instinct. He next produced Telling Lies in America, starring Kevin Bacon, Calista Flockhart, and Brad Renfro in 1996. The picture premiered at the N.Y. Film Festival and was released in September 1997. In 1996, he also executive-produced Universal's Leave It to Beaver, which was released in the fall of 1997.

In 1997, Myron produced Mike Figgis’One Night Stand, starring Wesley Snipes, which was released in November 1997; Disney's Mr. Magoo, which was released Christmas of 1997, and Burn Hollywood Burn, starring Whoopi Goldberg, Sylvester Stallone and Jackie Chan, which was released in January 1998. During the same year, Myron also executive produced Barney's Great Adventure, the famous purple dinosaur’s only feature, which PolyGram released in April 1998. Also in 1997, Variety named Myron one of Five Most Prolific Producers of the Year. In 1998, he produced The Mod Squad, starring Claire Danes and Omar Epps, for MGM, which was released in March 1999. Later that year, he executive-produced Hefner, an MOW for the USA Channel.

=== 2000s ===
Myron next produced Waking Up In Reno, which was released by Miramax in October 2002. The picture stars Billy Bob Thornton, Charlize Theron, Natasha Richardson and Patrick Swayze. The same year, he also produced the award-winning instructional program, Baby & Child CPR. He then produced Keep Your Eyes Open, a non-fiction film on extreme sports, directed by Tamra Davis, and starring the world’s top alternative sports athletes. Artisan released the film in August 2003. In 2003, Myron produced the hit family film, Cheaper By The Dozen, starring Steve Martin. Twentieth Century Fox released the film on Christmas Day 2003. He then produced the sequel, Cheaper By The Dozen 2, which was released in 2005.

=== 2010s ===
Projects in development include Hell's Angel, based on Hells Angels' founder Sonny Barger's autobiography, to be directed by Tony Scott for 20th Century Fox.

== Personal life ==
Myron is married to casting director Emily Schweber.

== Filmography ==
He was a producer in all films unless otherwise noted.

=== Film ===
Year	Film	Credit
1984	Signal 7	
1988	Checking Out	
1992	One False Move	
1995	Showgirls	Co-producer
1997	Telling Lies in America	
1997	Leave It to Beaver	Executive producer
1997	One Night Stand	
1997	An Alan Smithee Film: Burn Hollywood Burn	
1997	Mr. Magoo	
1998	Barney's Great Adventure	Executive producer
1999	The Mod Squad	
2002	Waking Up in Reno	
2003	Cheaper by the Dozen	
2005	Cheaper by the Dozen 2	

Miscellaneous crew

Year	Film	Role
1992	City of Joy	Executive: Lightmotive

=== Television ===
Year	Title	Credit	Notes
1999	Hefner: Unauthorized	Executive producer	Television film
