= Murder of Marcy Renee Conrad =

1981 child murder in California, United States

Marcy Renee Conrad
- Born: February 5, 1967
- Died: November 3, 1981 (aged 14); Milpitas, California, U.S.
- Occupation: Student
- Known for: Murder victim

The murder of Marcy Renee Conrad (February 5, 1967 – November 3, 1981), a 14-year-old, was perpetrated by Anthony Jacques Broussard, a 16-year-old high school student. Conrad's death gained national attention due to the age of her killer, forcing a re-evaluation of California statutes regarding juvenile sentencing for violent crimes. The case triggered widespread media coverage, as a stark example of social unrest among suburban youth.

The murder of Marcy Renee Conrad, and subsequent events, were the inspiration for the screenplay of the Tim Hunter film River's Edge.

== Murder ==
Marcy Renee Conrad, 14, was raped and killed by 16-year-old Anthony Jacques Broussard in his home in Milpitas, California, on November 3, 1981. Her body was transported in Broussard's pickup truck into nearby hills and dumped in a ravine. An autopsy confirmed that Conrad had been raped and then murdered by strangulation. In his later testimony, Broussard admitted to having sex with Marcy's corpse after her death.

After the murder, Broussard invited friends from Milpitas High School to view Conrad's corpse. Reports indicate that Broussard bragged about her death at school, and showed the body to at least 10 people. One of the students, 16-year-old Kirk Rassmussen kicked leaves over her body. He was later charged and sentenced to three years in a juvenile facility as an accessory. After two days, one student and one 18-year-old notified the police. When the other Milpitas students were asked why they had not alerted the police, they responded that they "did not want to get in trouble."

Broussard pleaded guilty and was sentenced to 25 years to life. He was denied a new trial in 1985 and was repeatedly denied parole. As of April 6, 2023, Broussard has been paroled from California State Prison, Solano.

== In culture ==
The murder partially inspired the screenplay for the 1986 film River's Edge.

The murder, and River’s Edge, are mentioned in John Darnielle’s 2022 novel, Devil House.

== See also ==
- List of kidnappings
