= The Waterdance =

1992 American comedy-drama film

- Theatrical release poster
- Directed by: Neal Jimenez; Michael Steinberg
- Written by: Neal Jimenez
- Produced by: Marie Cantin (producer); Gale Anne Hurd (producer); Guy Riedel (executive producer)
- Starring: Eric Stoltz; Wesley Snipes; William Forsythe; Helen Hunt; Elizabeth Peña
- Cinematography: Mark Plummer
- Edited by: Jeff Freeman
- Music by: Michael Convertino
- Distributed by: The Samuel Goldwyn Company
- Release date: May 13, 1992
- Running time: 106 minutes
- Country: United States
- Language: English
- Budget: $2.7 million
- Box office: $1,723,319 (United States)

The Waterdance is a 1992 American comedy-drama film directed by Neal Jimenez and Michael Steinberg and starring Eric Stoltz, Wesley Snipes, William Forsythe, and Helen Hunt. It was written by Neal Jimenez. The film is a semi-autobiographical story about a young fiction writer who becomes paraplegic in a hiking accident and works to rehabilitate his body and mind at a rehabilitation center.

The title refers to a dream recounted by Raymond Hill, Snipes's character, about dancing on the surface of a lake. Since, in Raymond's dream, he must continue dancing on the lake to avoid sinking and drowning, the dream may be a metaphoric reference to the necessity of continually coping with the world.

== Plot ==
Joel Garcia is a writer who, after a hiking accident at a mountain, must struggle with paralysis. At the same time, he carries a relationship with Anna, a married woman, with whom he was having an affair at the time of the accident. The lovers attempt to carry on their affair during his emotional and difficult rehabilitation as a paraplegic.

== Cast ==
- Eric Stoltz as Joel Garcia
- Wesley Snipes as Raymond Hill
- William Forsythe as Bloss
- William Allen Young as Lee
- Helen Hunt as Anna
- Elizabeth Peña as Rosa
- Grace Zabriskie as Pat
- Tony Genaro as Victor
- Thomas F. Duffy as Dr. Harrison
- Susan Gibney as Cheryl Lynn

== Reception ==
=== Critical response ===
The Waterdance received mostly positive reviews from critics; it holds a 94% approval rating at Rotten Tomatoes from 17 reviews.

In a review that awarded three and a half stars out of four, Roger Ebert praised Stoltz's acting and commented, "'The Waterdance' is about the everyday process of continuing one's life under a tragically altered set of circumstances. It considers what life is, and under what conditions it is worth living. After all the cheap sentiment that's been brought to this subject over the years, it is exhilarating and challenging to see a movie that knows exactly what it's talking about, and looks you straight in the eye."

Steve Davis of The Austin Chronicle wrote, "The performances are nothing less than extraordinary. Stoltz, an actor who has seldom exhibited anything but genial blandness, uses this temperament to good effect here as Joel, a man who tempers the bitterness he feels over what's happened to him with benign acceptance. Snipes and Forsythe are both superb as the two fellow travelers in wheelchairs whom Joel befriends in the ward; their emoting is so real you often forget they're actors."

=== Accolades ===
The Waterdance won the Audience Award for Best Dramatic Feature and the Waldo Salt Screenwriting Award at the 1992 Sundance Film Festival.

The Waterdance was nominated for four Independent Spirit Awards in 1992 and was the only film to win two awards that year for Best First Feature and Best Screenplay.
