= The Gift (2000 film) =

2000 film by Sam Raimi

- Theatrical release poster
- Directed by: Sam Raimi
- Written by: Billy Bob Thornton; Tom Epperson
- Produced by: James Jacks; Gary Lucchesi; Tom Rosenberg; Grant Curtis
- Starring: Cate Blanchett; Giovanni Ribisi; Keanu Reeves; Katie Holmes; Greg Kinnear; Hilary Swank; J. K. Simmons
- Cinematography: Jamie Anderson
- Edited by: Bob Murawski
- Music by: Christopher Young
- Production companies: Lakeshore Entertainment; Alphaville Films
- Distributed by: Paramount Classics (United States); Lakeshore Entertainment (International)
- Release date: December 22, 2000
- Running time: 112 minutes
- Country: United States
- Language: English
- Budget: $10 million
- Box office: $44.6 million

The Gift is a 2000 American independent Southern Gothic supernatural thriller film directed by Sam Raimi and written by Billy Bob Thornton and Tom Epperson. Thornton and Epperson had written the screenplay for the film prior to the former's 1996 breakout success Sling Blade, with Thornton taking inspiration from his own mother's alleged psychic experiences.

Set in the small Georgia town of Brixton, the film focuses on Annie Wilson (portrayed by Cate Blanchett), a widowed mother and clairvoyant who operates as a fortune teller in the rural community to several townsfolk including Buddy Cole (portrayed by Giovanni Ribisi), a mechanic struggling with his mental health due to abuse by his father, and Valerie Barksdale (portrayed by Hilary Swank), a woman in an abusive marriage with her hateful, violent redneck husband Donnie (portrayed by Keanu Reeves).

Annie receives psychic visions of a gruesome murder and soon finds herself in the town's spotlight when she assists local law enforcement in the missing persons case of Jessica King (portrayed by Katie Holmes), the fiancé of the local school's principal Wayne Collins (portrayed by Greg Kinnear).

Filming took place on location around various cities and towns in the Savannah metropolitan area in the state of Georgia from February to March 2000.

== Plot ==
In Brixton, Georgia, widow Annie Wilson lives with her three sons. To earn a living, she offers psychic readings to locals. She is friendly with Buddy Cole, an emotionally unstable young man who works at an auto repair shop, and Valerie Barksdale, a woman in an abusive marriage. Valerie's husband Donnie has repeatedly threatened Annie's family because Annie advised Valerie to leave him.

Jessica King, the fiancée of the school principal, Wayne Collins, disappears. After a few days, pressured by Jessica's wealthy father, Sheriff Johnson reluctantly consults Annie. Annie, who is clairvoyant, receives fragmented visions of Jessica's dead body in a pond and several landmarks. Despite his skepticism, Johnson narrows down the location to a pond on Donnie Barksdale's land. The police find Jessica's body there, and Donnie is arrested for her murder.

Buddy, distraught, comes to see Annie. She gives him a washcloth to wipe his face with. Buddy is filled with pain and anger towards his father, and later tries to explain why to Annie, but Annie is preoccupied with the murder and does not listen. That evening, Buddy's mother calls Annie for help, as Buddy has tied his father to a chair. Annie arrives and witnesses Buddy set his father on fire after he reveals that his father sexually abused him as a child. Buddy is arrested and taken to a mental hospital.

At Donnie's trial, he admits to an affair with Jessica. He is convicted of Jessica's murder and sent to prison. Later, Annie receives more visions revealing Donnie's innocence as well as a premonition of her own death. She asks prosecutor David Duncan to reopen the case and find the real murderer, threatening to reveal his affair with Jessica, to which she was a witness.

Annie confides in Wayne about Donnie's innocence of the murder. At Wayne's suggestion, he and Annie drive out to the pond at night, where Annie has a vision revealing that Wayne is the real murderer. Wayne confesses that he was angry after discovering Jessica was cheating on him with multiple other men including Donnie. Wayne attempts to kill Annie by striking her in the head with a flashlight, but Buddy appears and knocks him out. Annie and Buddy lock the unconscious Wayne in the trunk of Annie's car. Buddy tells Annie that he escaped from the mental hospital, and returns the washcloth she had previously given him.

The two drive to the police station. After encouraging her, Buddy waits in the car while she enters the station. When she returns with the police, Buddy has disappeared. When Annie explains what happened at the pond, Johnson informs her that Buddy died by suicide earlier that day. Annie reaches into her pocket and pulls out the washcloth Buddy returned to her. Annie returns home and looks at photographs of her late husband Ben that her oldest son holds as he falls asleep each night. The next morning, she and her sons visit his grave together.

== Cast ==
- Cate Blanchett as Annabelle "Annie" Wilson
- Giovanni Ribisi as Buddy Cole
- Keanu Reeves as Donnie Barksdale
- Katie Holmes as Jessica King
- Greg Kinnear as Wayne Collins
- Hilary Swank as Valerie Barksdale
- Michael Jeter as Gerald Weems
- Kim Dickens as Linda
- Gary Cole as David Duncan
- Rosemary Harris as Annie's grandmother
- J. K. Simmons as Sheriff Pearl Johnson
- Chelcie Ross as Kenneth King
- John Beasley as Albert Hawkins
- Lynnsee Provence as Mike Wilson
- Hunter McGilvray as Miller Wilson
- Stuart Greer as Officer Huggins
- Jeff Bragg as Jed Barksdale
- Danny Elfman as Tommy Lee Ballard

== Production ==
The film was written by Billy Bob Thornton and Tom Epperson before the success of Sling Blade.

== Release ==
The Gift was released theatrically in the United States on December 22, 2000, by Paramount Classics.

=== Home media ===
Paramount Home Entertainment released The Gift on VHS and DVD in July 2001. On December 3, 2024, Scream Factory released a collector's edition 4K UHD Blu-ray edition of the film, while a 4K UHD Blu-ray is released in the United Kingdom by Arrow Films on January 27, 2025.

== Reception ==
=== Critical response ===
On Rotten Tomatoes the film has an approval rating of 58% based on 123 reviews, with an average score of 5.90/10. The site's consensus reads, "With a reported budget of around 10 million, The Gift is obviously a labor of love for those involved. Unfortunately, the A-list cast can't prevent the movie from becoming a by-the-numbers whodunit with an ending that's all but unsatisfactory." Metacritic, which uses a weighted average, assigned the film a score of 62 out of 100, based on 29 critics, indicating "generally favorable" reviews. Audiences surveyed by CinemaScore gave the film a grade B on a scale of A to F.

Roger Ebert gave the film 3 out of 4, and called it "Ingenious in its plotting, colorful in its characters, taut in its direction and fortunate in possessing Cate Blanchett." Peter Travers of Rolling Stone wrote: "Raimi's flair for rich atmospherics — expertly abetted by cinematographer Jamie Anderson (Grosse Pointe Blank) and composer Christopher Young (Wonder Boys) — and a cast that goes full throttle hold you in thrall. " Todd McCarthy of Variety wrote: "Raimi eschews trendy, over-emphatic effects in favor of a straightforward approach that makes for a solid tale well told."

Kenneth Turan of the Los Angeles Times gave it a mixed review and was critical that the "Characters lean too heavily toward the Southern grotesque, and the direction the plot is heading is more predictable than it should be." Despite praising the cast, Turan wrote: "Overly familiar material, even well done, cannot be made more intrinsically interesting than it is. Not even by Cate Blanchett and Keanu Reeves." A. O. Scott of The New York Times wrote: "The picture is saved from mediocrity by Mr. Raimi's smooth competence, and by the unusually high quality of the acting." Curt Fields of The Washington Post called it "So chock-full of stereotypes as to be a filmic Southern Country Safari" and advised "Don't Bother Opening This 'Gift'".

=== Box office ===
The film grossed $12,008,642 at the U.S. box office against a production budget of $10 million.

=== Accolades ===
Award	Category	Nominee(s)	Result	Ref.
Fangoria Chainsaw Awards	Best Actress	Cate Blanchett	Nominated	
Fangoria Chainsaw Awards	Best Supporting Actor	Keanu Reeves	Nominated	
Independent Spirit Awards	Best Supporting Male	Giovanni Ribisi	Nominated	
Phoenix Film Critics Society Awards	Best Actress	Cate Blanchett	Nominated	
Saturn Awards	Best Horror Film		Nominated	
Saturn Awards	Best Actress	Cate Blanchett	Nominated	
Saturn Awards	Best Supporting Actor	Giovanni Ribisi	Nominated	
Saturn Awards	Best Supporting Actress	Hilary Swank	Nominated	
Saturn Awards	Best Writing	Billy Bob Thornton and Tom Epperson	Nominated	
Teen Choice Awards	Choice Movie – Horror/Thriller		Nominated	
World Stunt Awards	Best Fire Stunt	Erik Cord	Nominated	
