= Veleno Guitars =

Manufacturer of aluminum electric guitars

Veleno Guitars is an American company which specializes in creating electric guitars made out of aluminium, known for their unique sound quality. These guitars were designed by metal craftsman John Veleno, who also built the original models from 1970 to 1977. In 2023, Veleno Guitars would reissue their Veleno Original model.

== History ==
Throughout the years of 1961 and 1962, John Veleno worked as a guitar teacher, also having a day job as a machinist. In 1963, Veleno would move to Florida, where he would be offered a job by the Universal Machine Company in St. Petersburg, to which he accepted. During his time at the Universal Machine Company, he would be instructed to make aluminum boxes that would be used to hold electronic components on rockets launched from Cape Canaveral.

While working at the Universal Machine Company, Veleno obtained a license which allowed him to give guitar lessons in his house. To advertise his guitar lessons, Veleno decided to create a guitar-shaped mailbox out of aluminum to bypass local ordinances that would only allow him to put up a sign that was one foot by one foot in size. After being approached by his aluminum supplier, asking him "Why not make a guitar out of aluminum?", Veleno would then begin working on the prototype for the first Veleno guitar.

A prototype was completed in 1967. The first guitars were built in 1972.

== Veleno Original ==
Veleno Original
- Manufacturer: Veleno Guitars
- Period: 1970-1977, 2023-present

Construction
- Body type: Hollow
- Neck joint: Bolt-on

Woods
- Body: Aluminum
- Neck: Aluminum
- Fretboard: Aluminum

Hardware
- Bridge: House made; Tune-o-matic; Schaller 3 way

Colors available
- Chrome finish, gold plated, polished aluminum, anodized red, anodized blue, anodized green, anodized black, anodized gold, ebony, and "super finish".

The Veleno Original is Veleno Guitars' first guitar model, as well as its main guitar model. Being made almost entirely out of aluminum, a benefit that comes from its material would be that the guitar itself is very sturdy. The neck does not contain a truss rod, and the body is able to protect the electronic components from any damage on the outside.

== List of notable artists who own Veleno guitars ==
- Marc Bolan of T.Rex
- Eric Clapton
- Gregg Allman of the Allman Brothers Band
- Lou Reed
- Johnny Winter
- Ace Frehley of Kiss
- Todd Rundgren
- Dolly Parton
- Sonny Bono
- Chris Pontius
- Steve Albini of Shellac (Veleno guitar heard on Albini/Zeni Geva's "All Right, You Little Bastards!" live album)
- Pete Haycock of the Climax Blues Band
- Ray Monette of Rare Earth
- Mark Farner of Grand Funk Railroad, who owned three Veleno guitars
- Ronnie Montrose of Montrose and The Edgar Winter Band
- Jeff Lynne of Electric Light Orchestra
- Mick Mars of Mötley Crüe
- Ed Kuepper of The Saints
- Keith Levene of Public Image Ltd. and The Clash
- Robby Krieger of The Doors
- David Surkamp of Pavlov's Dog
- David Robinson of The Cars (Veleno guitar shown on their "Panorama" album)
- Vincent Gallo
- Johnny Depp
- Frank Hannon of Tesla
- Twiggy Ramirez of Marilyn Manson
- Eric Erlandson of Hole
- Justice (band)
- John Lennon
- Kurt Cobain of Nirvana (Veleno on loan from Steve Albini)
- Steve Stevens of Billy Idol
- Nicky Panicci of Ben Harper and School Girls
