= Danyi Deats =

American film actor and producer

Danyi Deats (born November 8, 1967) is an American film actress and producer. She has acted in films, and is credited as a producer and writer for television, commercials and music videos.

== Acting career ==
Danyi's first role was in Steven Spielberg's Close Encounters of the Third Kind when she was 9 years old. Her most widely known role is her portrayal of the dead body of Jamie in the film River's Edge, with Keanu Reeves and Dennis Hopper.

== Producing career ==
Deats has produced music videos and television commercials with artists such as Beyoncé, Selena Gomez, Ed Sheeran, Jennifer Lopez, Calvin Harris, Ellie Goulding, Lana Del Rey, Meghan Trainor, Sting, Missy Elliott, Shania Twain, Janet Jackson, and Jewel.

Video Music Production Credits include :

- 1998, MTV Music Video Award for Best Group Video "Everybody" by Backstreet Boys.
- 2000, MTV Music Video Award for Best Hip-Hop Video for Sisqo's "Thong Song".
- 2018, Aria Award Best Video Dean Lewis "Be All Right"

== Personal life ==
Danyi is from Los Angeles where she lives with her husband and business partner Eric Barrett. Together they own Mirror Films. They have three children.

Deats is also a local artist with past exhibits at Ghetto Gloss in Los Angeles. She completed her first novel, Meow Meow.
