= Tom Epperson =

American author and screenwriter

Tom Epperson is an American author and screenwriter, known for his collaborations with Billy Bob Thornton.

== Filmography ==
Year	Title	As Writer	As Producer	Credited Director	Notes
1992	One False Move	Yes		Carl Franklin	Co-Written with Billy Bob Thornton; Nominated - Independent Spirit Award for Best Screenplay
1996	A Family Thing	Yes		Richard Pearce	Co-Written with Billy Bob Thornton & L Guy Burton
1996	Don't Look Back	Yes	Yes	Geoff Murphy	Television; Co-Written with Billy Bob Thornton
1997	A Gun, a Car, a Blonde	Yes	Yes	Stefani Ames	Co-Written with Stefani Ames
2000	The Gift	Yes		Sam Raimi	Co-Written with Billy Bob Thornton; Nominated - Saturn Award for Best Writing
2001	Camouflage	Yes		James Keach	Credited as Nigel Dial; Co-Written with Billy Bob Thornton
2006	Jesse Stone: Night Passage	Yes		Robert Harmon	Television
2012	Jayne Mansfield's Car	Yes		Billy Bob Thornton	Co-Written with Billy Bob Thornton

== Novels ==
- The Kind One (2008)
- Sailor (2012)
- Roberto To The Dark Tower Came (2018)
- Make Believe (2022)
- Baby Hawke (Forthcoming)
