= Pete Haycock =

English musician (1951–2013)

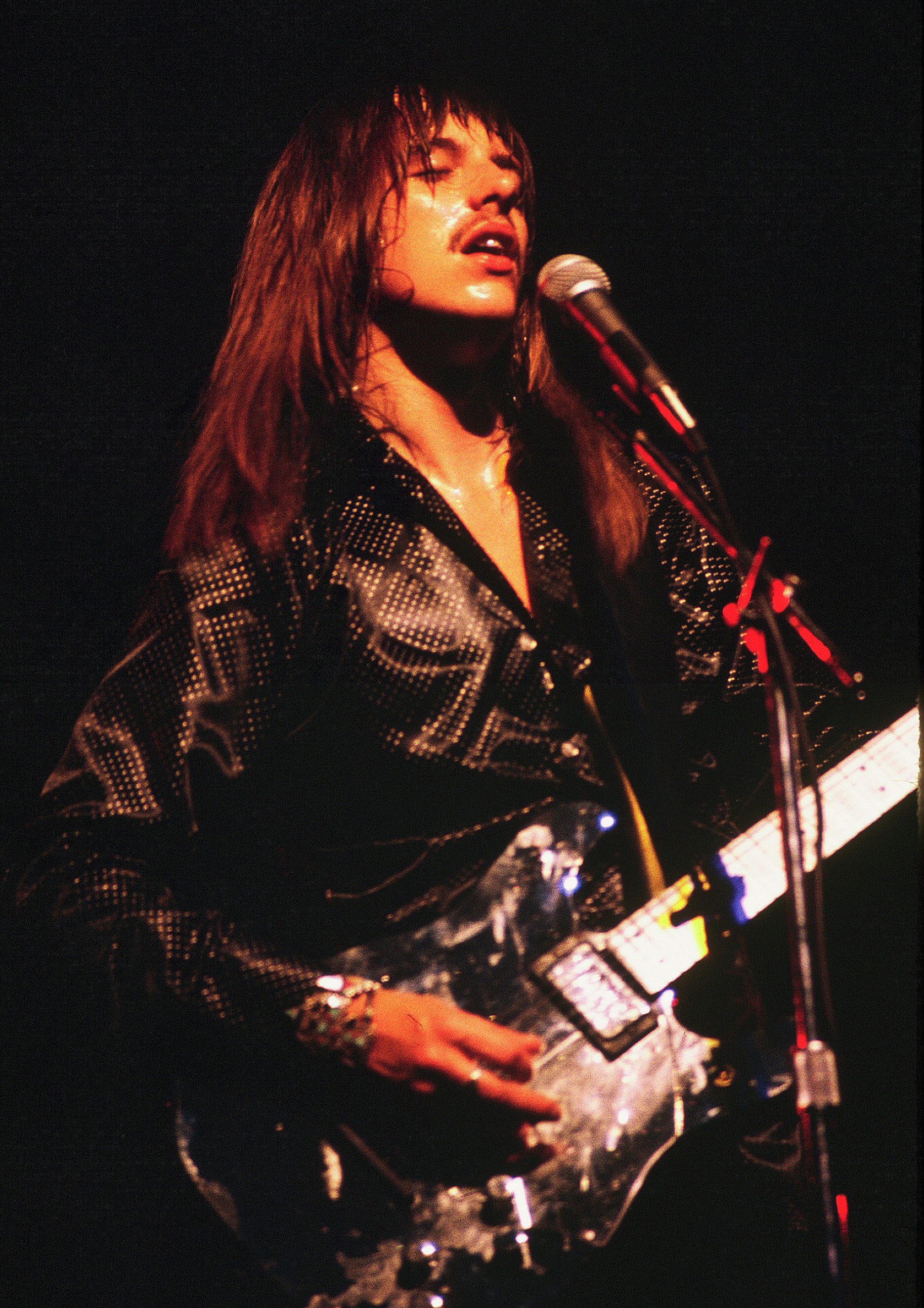
- Haycock with the Climax Blues Band in 1974

Background information
- Born: Peter John Haycock; 4 March 1951; Stafford, England
- Died: 30 October 2013 (aged 62) Frankfurt, Germany
- Genres: Rock, blues rock
- Occupations: Musician, composer
- Instruments: Vocals, guitar, bass
- Years active: 1968–2013
- Formerly of: Climax Blues Band, Electric Light Orchestra Part II, The H Factor, The LovePower Band

Peter John Haycock (4 March 1951 – 30 October 2013) was an English musician and film score composer. He began his career as lead guitarist, vocalist, and founding member of the Climax Blues Band.

== Early life and career ==
Haycock was born in Stafford, and here he attended St. John's Primary School and King Edward VI Boys Grammar School. As a child, he was impressed by the guitar solos of Hank Marvin of The Shadows. He played his first electric guitar at a miners club when he was 12. He then played guitar at school and college dances. Along with local boys, he formed a blues band, the Mason–Dixon Line. In 1967, Haycock met Colin Cooper and joined his soul band The Gospel Truth. In 1968, they founded a new band, the Climax Chicago Blues Band, and then they eventually changed its name to the Climax Blues Band, in 1970. The band's original line-up consisted of Haycock (lead guitar, vocals), Cooper (harmonica, vocals), Derek Holt (guitar, vocals), Richard Jones (bass), Arthur Wood (keyboards), George Newsome (drums).

During the early 1970s, the Climax Blues Band went through a few personnel changes, before arriving at their most stable, creative, and successful line-up, which consisted of Haycock, Cooper, Holt (switched to bass guitar), and John Cuffley (drums). In 1976, the line-up with keyboardist Richard Jones wrote the band's biggest hit "Couldn't Get It Right". The song included the vocal harmonies of Haycock and Holt, behind Cooper's lead. Haycock, an underrated vocalist, sang lead on several of the band's tracks, particularly on the Sense of Direction (1974), Stamp Album (1975), Gold Plated (1976), Shine On (1978), Real to Reel (1979), and Flying The Flag (1980). albums. The band with the core line-up of Haycock, Cooper, Holt, and John Cuffley toured heavily in the 1970s and 1980s. During much of this period, Haycock played concerts with his rare trademark instrument, a gold-plated Veleno guitar, which was also on the cover of the album Gold Plated.

Holt and Cuffley left in 1983, with Holt going on to play with Nektar guitarist Roye Albrighton in the band Grand Alliance. Haycock and Cooper went their separate ways after their final Climax Blues Band album together, 1983's Sample and Hold.

In May 2012, the Major League Productions Ltd record label released an until-then unknown vault recording of a 1976 live performance, featuring the Climax Blues Band at the top of their game: Climax Blues Band / World Tour 1976. Haycock provided some insightful liner notes for the CD's insert, and the recording further demonstrates the tight musicianship that was found in the band's line-up at that time.

In March 2015, a 4-CD retrospective was released entitled Live, Rare, and Raw 1973–1979, featuring the band at the height of their powers, in a variety of Live settings. This release would parallel the ferocity and acclaim of Climax Blues Band's 1973 album, FM/Live. The band produced more than 15 successful albums in their heyday.

== Post Climax Blues Band ==
Though another group of musicians, which at one time was led by late former bandmate Colin Cooper, is currently calling themselves "Climax Blues Band", their lineup does not consist of any founding members, and has not found the commercial success or following that the original, "true" Climax Blues Band enjoyed during Haycock's years with the band. Cooper died in 2008.

In 1984, the band members went their separate ways, and Haycock went on to record several solo projects, the first of which was the album Total Climax (1986) recorded with his new band, Pete Haycock's Climax. Pete Haycock's Climax toured extensively in Europe, including Communist East Germany, as well as a well-received tour in Australia, also releasing The Soft Spot (1987). During this period, Haycock was asked by former Climax Blues Band manager, Miles Copeland, to record an instrumental album for I.R.S. No Speak, Guitar and Son, and Night of the Guitars, a live album from the tour of the same name. After that tour, in 1989, Haycock teamed up with Holt and guitarist Steve Hunter to record an album under the name the H Factor. The Pete Haycock Band consisted of the musicians from the Total Climax lineup, and went on to record a live album titled Livin' It in 1992. Copeland also signed Gary Numan to I.R.S. with whom Haycock collaborated with on the 1988 album Metal Rhythm.

Haycock was approached by Bev Bevan, formerly of Electric Light Orchestra, to join the newly formed Electric Light Orchestra Part II. The group toured and recorded with Haycock in the early 1990s, releasing both a live CD and video of their performance with the Moscow Symphony Orchestra. They recorded and toured together until 1993.

== Film scores ==
In the early 1990s, Haycock was asked by Hans Zimmer to collaborate on film scores for K2 (1991), and Toys (1992). Other film scores they worked on were for Drop Zone (1994), and The Dilemma (2011), among others. Haycock's slide guitar contributed to Thunderbird, the theme music for the 1991 film, Thelma & Louise. Haycock was asked by Zimmer to re-create his performance, with a live symphony orchestra for the recording of Wings of a Film, which was a compilation album of Zimmer's successful film scores.

Haycock began composing music of his own for film and television. Along with Holt, he composed music for the 1992 film One False Move. More scores would follow, and Haycock helped produce recordings for other artists.

== Charity projects ==
In 2005, Haycock supplied all the music for the Hollister Independence Motorcycle Rally DVD charity project, for producer Jeff Byler, with proceeds benefiting Emmaus House, a shelter for battered women and children. When the DVD's producer suggested a follow-up soundtrack to the project, Haycock went back into the studio to complete the album that became Bikers' Dozen, which featured a vocal performance by John Fiddler (Medicine Head).

Haycock signed on as a major contributor to the LovePower and Peace charity CD project in 2009, which was spearheaded by fellow musician Robin George, and was built around George's hit song, "LovePower and Peace". Haycock contributed many trademark slide guitar tracks and donated studio time to the project, a charity effort to benefit children with cancer and other terminal diseases.

This collaboration, which included the donated talents of scores of veteran musicians, also resulted in the forming a "super group" called The LovePower Band, which landed a major record deal and completed its first album, which was released in 2011.

== Return to the stage ==
After an absence from the stage and live performances, Haycock formed a new band, Pete Haycock's True Blues (featuring Glen Turner). In 2008, they toured Europe and released their first recording together: Pete Haycock's True Blues Live (featuring Glen Turner). In April 2009, Haycock, in an interview talked about the early days with the Climax Blues Band, the transition to studio work (with and without Hans Zimmer), and his return to the stage with his new band, after an absence from live performances of 14 years.

Haycock continued to record, and perform live, and had been a featured guest performer with the Siggi Schwarz' band, and was on the same bill with ZZ Top and Johnny Winter in 2012.

2013 found Haycock coming full-circle with the formation of a super-group recording and scheduled for touring as Pete Haycock's Climax Blues Band featuring Robin George, with Haycock being joined by a lineup of musicians including George, with whom he had collaborated on the LovePower Band, and other projects. Haycock envisioned this project as a return to the "true" Climax Blues Band, and he had just completed the new album, Broke Heart Blues, before his death.

== Death ==
Haycock built a recording studio in Frankfurt, Germany where he lived for several years until his death. He died of a heart attack on 30 October 2013 in Frankfurt. He was 62.
