= Neal Jimenez =

American screenwriter (1960–2022)

- Born: May 22, 1960; Sacramento, California, U.S.
- Died: December 11, 2022 (aged 62); Arroyo Grande, California, U.S.
- Education: University of California, Los Angeles
- Occupations: Screenwriter, film director
- Years active: 1986–1995
- Notable work: River's Edge

Neal Jimenez (May 22, 1960 – December 11, 2022) was an American screenwriter and film director, best known for the 1986 film River's Edge. He was a member of the dramatic jury at the Sundance Film Festival in 1994. He won Independent Spirit Awards for Best First Feature and Best Screenplay for The Waterdance.

== Biography ==
Jimenez was born in Sacramento, California. He initially enrolled at Santa Clara University, studying English, but transferred to the UCLA School of Theater, Film and Television, where he wrote the script for River's Edge.

In 1984, while a film student, he went hiking with some friends and slipped on a rock, falling twenty feet into a shallow pool below. He was initially paralyzed from the neck down but subsequent surgeries restored movement to his upper body, making him paraplegic. The film The Waterdance, which he wrote and co-directed, was partly based on his experience in rehabilitation. It stars Eric Stoltz as a successful young writer who must deal with his new life using a wheelchair. It won Best First Feature and Best Screenplay at the 1993 Independent Spirit Awards.

Jimenez wrote a number of films in the 1980s and 1990s, most notably River's Edge, starring Crispin Glover, Keanu Reeves, and Dennis Hopper, as well as For the Boys, starring Bette Midler. He also worked as a script doctor on films such as Outbreak.

Jimenez died of heart failure in Arroyo Grande, California, on December 11, 2022, at the age of 62.

== Filmography ==
=== Film ===
Year	Title	Writer	Producer	Director
1986	River's Edge	Yes	No	No
1986	Where the River Runs Black	Yes	No	No
1991	The Dark Wind	Yes	No	No
1991	For the Boys	Yes	No	No
1992	The Waterdance	Yes	No	Yes
1994	Sleep with Me	Yes	No	No
1995	Hideaway	Yes	No	No
1998	They Come at Night	No	executive	No

Uncredited revisions

- Outbreak (1995)
- Mad Love (1995)
- Anaconda (1997)
- Desperate Measures (1998)
- Dr. Dolittle (1998)
- Instinct (1999)

Unmade projects

- The Blue Angel - A remake of the 1930 German musical comedy that would’ve starred Madonna, co-prouduced by Diane Keaton, and directed by Alan Parker.
- I Am Legend - An adaptation of the 1954 Richard Matheson novel.
- It Only Rains at Night - A project that Johnny Depp was to star in.
- Lonely Hearts of the Cosmos - An adaptation of the Dennis Overbye book of the same name that would’ve been produced by Tom Hanks and directed by Jonathan Demme.
- Lost Undercover - A project that Jimenez would’ve directed about an FBI agent who investigates the underground pornography world that would’ve been produced by Martin Scorsese.
- Round Rock - An adaptation of the Michelle Huneven novel of the same name that would’ve been directed by Helen Hunt.
- Stained Glass - A black comedy about married life that would’ve been directed by Steven Shainberg, and almost starred Eric Stoltz and Bridget Fonda.
- The Sweet Hereafter - An adaptation of the Russell Banks novel of the same name.
- The Virgin - A script that was being developed in late 2003.

Special thanks

- Two Lies (1990) (Short film)
- CinemAbility: The Art of Inclusion (2012) (documentary)

Other credits

Year	Title	Role
1988	Nightwatch	Additional Crew
