= Couldn't Get It Right =

1976 single by the Climax Blues Band

- Side A of the UK single

Single by Climax Blues Band

from the album Gold Plated
- B-side: "Fat Maybellene" (most countries): "Sav'ry Gravy" (US and Canada)
- Released: October 1976 (UK)
- Recorded: August 1976
- Genre: Soft rock; soul
- Length: 3:18
- Label: BTM (UK), Sire (US)
- Songwriters: Pete Haycock, Colin Cooper, Richard Jones, Derek Holt, John Cuffley
- Producers: Climax Blues Band; Mike Vernon (B-sides)

Official audio
- "Couldn't Get It Right" on YouTube

"Couldn't Get It Right" is a song by the Climax Blues Band. The song was written after the band's label told them that their 1976 album Gold Plated lacked a standout track and asked them to "try and write a hit". They then wrote it, in the words of its bassist Derek Holt, "from absolutely nowhere", and it hit number 10 on the UK Singles Chart.

The song was covered by American band Fun Lovin' Criminals for their 1999 album Mimosa.

== About ==
The song was recorded for their eighth studio album, Gold Plated, specifically written and produced after the manager of the band, Miles Copeland III, demanded the band add a radio-friendly song to the track listing. The band at the time had released eight albums and although that had translated into fame, they did not have a great impact on the charts. Copeland suggested a cover version of an Elvis Presley song; this suggestion was ignored, and instead the band came up with an original composition. It was simply a case of sitting in the studio, conjuring up a rhythm, appending the traditional dual vocals for which Climax Blues Band were known, and coming up with a couple of hooks. The sudden emergence of the song irritated the producer, as he thought the band had been withholding a hit from him.

In an interview with Songfacts, Derek Holt stated that the song was "just a lucky moment in time", and that it is about being on the road in America. The chorus "kept on looking for a sign in the middle of the night" referred to searches for Holiday Inn signs, the sight of which meant that beds had been found for the night. When the band's career first started in America, they used to fly everywhere, in some cases involving up to three flights just to get to one place. Their itineraries meant that getting to any one place was difficult and involved arriving in a town, getting into a car, getting to the gig just in time to perform the sound check, performing the gig, re-entering the car and then looking for a bed. The final few years of the band's life were easier as they switched to using tour buses. This enabled them to leave the gig, enter the bus, get a bed, drive extended distances (in Holt's words, "1,000 miles or whatever") and turn up at the next gig refreshed. The saxophonist Colin Cooper sang the baritone lead on this song, with the bassist Derek Holt, guitarist Pete Haycock and drummer John Cuffley singing harmony.

Climax Blues Band performed the song live twice on BBC's Top of the Pops.

== B-sides ==
While in most markets "Couldn't Get It Right" was released with "Fat Maybellene" as the B-side (although it did not appear on the album), in the United States and Canada the song was backed with album track "Sav'ry Gravy". Both tracks were produced by album producer Mike Vernon.

== Critical reception ==
In an obituary for band member Pete Haycock, The Independent said that the song "transcended the clichés of the road-song genre and incorporated several of their trademarks, including the vocal harmonies of Haycock and Holt behind Cooper's lead, and Haycock’s guitar being played in unison with Cooper’s saxophone, to create a concise gem of a single equal to the best work of the Doobie Brothers or Ace."

== Chart performance ==
The song was originally released by RCA Records in early 1976. Although the song did not make the UK Singles Chart until October 1976 it did manage to crack the top ten, entering at #47 and departing from #18 in early December 1976, having been at positions #10 and #11 the weeks before. It reached #8 in Canada and #29 in New Zealand.

Later on that year, the song was picked up by Sire Records and the following year it made #3 on the US Billboard Hot 100. Later that year, the song was ranked #32 on Billboard Year-End Hot 100 singles of 1977.

=== Weekly charts ===
Chart (1976–1977)	Peak position
Canada Top Singles (RPM)	8
Canada RPM Adult Contemporary	38
Ireland (IRMA)	8
New Zealand (Recorded Music NZ)	29
South Africa (Springbok Radio)	9
Sweden (Sverigetopplistan)	5
UK Singles (Official Charts)	10
US Billboard Hot 100	3
US Billboard Adult Contemporary	43
US Cash Box Top 100	7

=== Year-end charts ===
Chart (1977)	Rank
Canada	87
US Billboard Hot 100	32
US Cash Box	53
