= Cynda Williams =

American actress

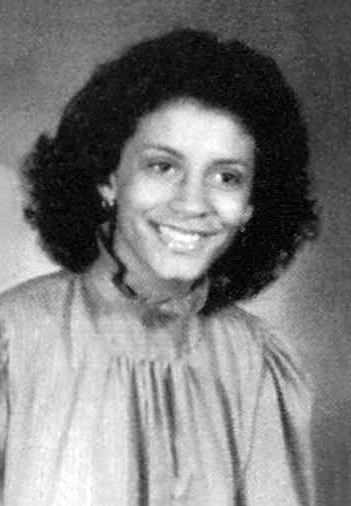
- Williams in 1984
- Born: Cindy Ann Williams; Chicago, Illinois, U.S.
- Other names: Cynda Will; Cindy Williams
- Education: Ball State University
- Occupations: Actress; singer
- Years active: 1989–present
- Spouse: Billy Bob Thornton (m. 1990; div. 1992)
- Children: 1

Cindy Ann Williams, known as Cynda Williams, is an American actress. She made her film debut as Clarke Bentancourt in Spike Lee's Mo' Better Blues (1990), followed by a starring role in the thriller One False Move (1992), which earned her an Independent Spirit Award nomination for Best Female Lead.

== Early life and education ==
Williams was born Cindy Ann Williams in Chicago, Illinois to Charles, a police officer and Beverly, a medical lab technician. She was raised in the Pullman neighborhood on the city's south side. She spent parts of her early childhood in Indiana, where she sang in her grandfather's church. Williams attended Bennett Elementary School before she moved with her mother to Muncie, Indiana, as a teenager. While in Indiana, Williams attended Northside High School; graduating in 1984.

After high school, Williams attended Ball State University, studying theater, and was crowned Ms. Ball State in 1987. She graduated in 1989.

== Career ==
In 1989, Williams changed her first name to "Cynda" to avoid conflicts with Laverne & Shirley actress Cindy Williams, who was also listed by the same name with the Screen Actors Guild. Williams has acted in films on both television and in the cinema. Her first appearance in a feature film was in Spike Lee's 1990 Mo' Better Blues. "In the Midwest, I was told by casting directors that I wasn't the right type because I didn't look black enough, and I didn't look white," says Williams. "But everything changed when I moved to New York, because my look could cross different lines." She was also in One False Move (1992) as well as the Tales of the City Channel 4/PBS miniseries.

Williams had a brief stint in the music industry in 1990 with her appearance on the soundtrack to Mo' Better Blues, on the song "Harlem Blues". The single was popular, reaching No. 9 on the R&B charts on November 17, 1990. With the success of the single, Williams had been lined up with Sony to produce her own album. While she was trained in a variety of genres, jazz became pressed on her after the success of "Harlem Blues". The album was shelved following internal disagreements at Sony.

== Personal life ==
Williams was married to her One False Move co-star Billy Bob Thornton, from 1990 to 1992.

== Filmography ==
=== Film ===
Year	Title	Role	Notes
1990	Mo' Better Blues	Clarke Bentancourt	
1992	One False Move	Lila "Fantasia" Walker	
1993	Ghost Brigade	Rebecca	
1995	Condition Red	Gidell Ryan	
1995	The Tie That Binds	Lisa-Marie Chandler	
1996	Sweeper	Diane	
1996	Spirit Lost	Arabella	
1996	Black Rose of Harlem	Georgia	
1996	Tales of Erotica	Davida Urked	
1998	Caught Up	Vanessa Dietrich/Trish	
1998	Relax...It's Just Sex	Sarina Classer	
1998	The Last Call	-	
2001	MacArthur Park	Alicia	
2001	March	Angela Walsh	
2003	With or Without You	Cheri Fontenot	
2004	Shooter	Coach Mary	Short film
2005	When Do We Eat?	Grace	
2007	Frankie D	Barbara	
2007	Divine Intervention	Sister Grier	
2008	Tru Loved	Lisa	
2008	Beautiful Loser	Dennice (Adult)	
2012	Turning Point	Dede Johnson	
2014	Gangland	Tammy	
2015	72 Hours	Liyah	
2017	The Hills	Miss Lee	
2017	Ray Meets Helen	Doctor Harris	
2017	A Chance in the World	Ruby Dottin	Credited as 'Lynda Williams'
2017	Wilted Rose	Tanya Sanchez	Short film
2017	Pieces of David	Detective Elaine	
2018	Every 21 Seconds	Administrative Nurse Malone	
2019	A Sisterhood of Signatures	Mrs. Owens	Short film
2019	Welfare Check	Jo	Short film; also producer
2019	Everyday But Christmas	Deanna's Mother	
2020	Why Me	Ms. Black	Also producer
2020	The Misadventures of Mistress Maneater	Deb	
2021	Mad As Hell	Detective Briggs	
2021	Untold: The Back & Forth Story	Chriss Murray	
2021	Finding Dawn	Dawn	Short film
2021	Life Ain't Like the Movies	Pat Mills	
2023	Kings of L.A.	Yolie	

=== Television ===
Year	Title	Role	Notes
1993	Tales of the City	D'orothea Wilson	Recurring cast
1995	Marker	Pamela Austin	Episode: "Truth, Lies and Rock 'n' Roll"
1995	Fallen Angels	Deletha	Episode: "Fearless"
1996	Gang in Blue	Anita Boyard	TV movie
1997	New York Undercover	Erica Rockler	Episode: "Hubris"
1998	The Wedding	Liz Odis	TV movie
1999	Introducing Dorothy Dandridge	Vivian Dandridge	TV movie
2000	The Courage to Love	Cecelia Delille	TV movie
2000	Hidden Blessings	Brandy Taylor	TV movie
2003	Violation	Rita Washington	TV movie
2006	Our House	Nurse	TV movie
2019	Black Privilege	Alderwoman Tyrina	TV movie

== Award nominations ==
Year	Award	Category	Title	Result
1993	Independent Spirit Award	Best Female Lead	One False Move	Nominated
