= Climax Blues Band =

British blues rock band

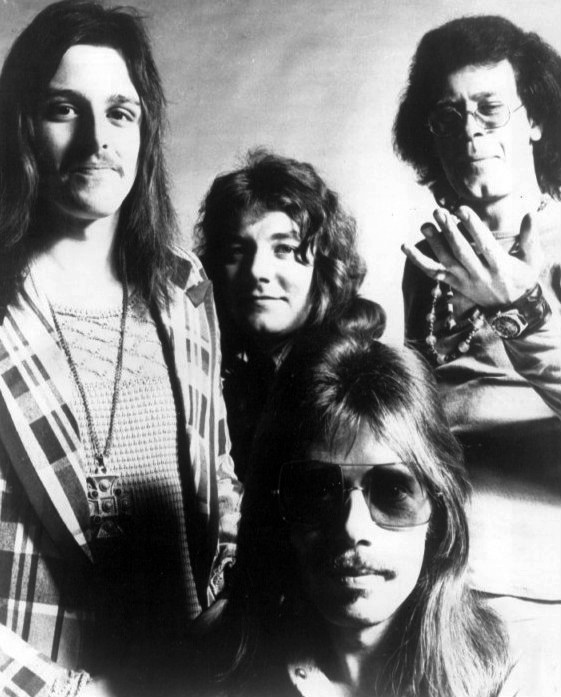
- The band in 1974; left to right: Pete Haycock, Derek Holt (top), Colin Cooper (bottom), John Cuffley

Background information
- Also known as: The Climax Chicago Blues Band (1968–1970); Climax Chicago (1971–1972)
- Origin: Stafford, England
- Genres: Blues rock, soft rock
- Years active: 1968–1984, 1986–present
- Labels: Harvest/EMI; Sire/Warner Bros.; Virgin; Major League Productions
- Members: George Glover; Roy Adams; Dan Machin; Neil Simpson; Chris Aldridge; Scott Ralph
- Past members: Colin Cooper; Pete Haycock; Derek Holt; George Newsome; Arthur Wood; Richard Jones; Anton Farmer; Peter Filleul; John Cuffley; John "Rhino" Edwards; Jeff Rich; Roger Inniss; Johnny Pugh; Lester Hunt; Graham Dee
- Website: climaxbluesband.com

Climax Blues Band (originally known as The Climax Chicago Blues Band) are a British blues rock and pop band that has released 22 albums. "Couldn't Get It Right" reached No. 10 on the UK Singles Chart and No. 3 on the Billboard Hot 100 in 1977. "I Love You" peaked on the Billboard chart at No. 12 in 1981.

== History ==
The band were formed in Stafford, Staffordshire, England, in 1968 by vocalist, saxophonist, guitarist and harmonica player Colin Cooper (1939–2008), guitarist, bassist and vocalist Pete Haycock (1951–2013), guitarist Derek Holt (b. 1949), bassist and keyboardist Richard Jones (b. 1949), drummer George Newsome (b. 1947) and keyboardist Arthur Wood (1929–2005).

Holt tells of their formation:

"When I left school, I went to work in a local grinding wheel factory as a laboratory assistant and attending college for a degree in Chemistry. Colin Cooper also worked there as a metallurgist, so that's how we met. He had already discovered a young Peter Haycock and had wanted to put a blues band together. He was already gigging with a jazz band on clarinet. We started doing local gigs with local drummer George Newsome and a keyboard player named Arthur Wood, who at the time was a school teacher. Our bass player then was Richard Jones, who also knew Pete from grammar school. I was rhythm guitarist. While playing local gigs we were "discovered" by a scout for the new EMI label Parlophone, who was on the look out for a young blues/rock outfit for their label. We signed up for two albums with them, though we still had day jobs, so had to take time off work to go and record in London. Our first album was recorded over two days in the infamous Abbey Road Studios in 1968. We were in Studio 1, The Beatles were in Studio 2 and Pink Floyd in Studio 3! I was just 19 years of age.

Their first two albums, Climax Chicago Blues Band (February 1969) and Plays On (October 1969), were released on Parlophone and were the first official productions by Chris Thomas, who had worked with the Beatles and would go on to produce Roxy Music, Elton John and many others.

Jones left the group in 1969 and Holt began playing bass. EMI switched the band over to their Harvest Records subsidiary in 1970 and their subsequent albums, A Lot of Bottle (December 1970) and Tightly Knit (October 1971), had a more rock-oriented feel.

Keyboardist Anton Farmer (a.k.a. Anton Ackerbauer) also played with the band from 1969 to 1970, appearing on their third album, A Lot of Bottle, and playing on live dates with the group, while their other keyboard player, Arthur Wood, restricted himself to studio sessions only. Wood also eventually left, in late 1971, to take a job with the BBC. Drummer John Cuffley replaced George Newsome in the summer of 1972, after the latter decided to leave when his wife was expecting their first child.

In 1971 the band had toyed with the idea of renaming to Climax Chicago, but in 1972 they opted for the shortened moniker of Climax Blues Band to avoid confusion with the group Chicago.

For Rich Man (November 1972; produced by American Richard Gottehrer and their very first to chart in the lower reaches of the US charts) in 1972 the band had settled into a permanent grouping, which remained stable for a decade, until 1982, comprising Colin Cooper (saxes, harmonica, clarinet, rhythm guitar and vocals), Peter Haycock (guitars, bass and vocals), Derek Holt (bass, keyboards and vocals) and John Cuffley (drums, percussion).

During the autumn of 1972, a chance meeting with up and coming mover and shaker Miles Copeland III led to the group hiring him to look after them when their original manager, Pete Riley, resigned. Copeland was instrumental in bringing them over to tour the US for the first of many times in May 1973.

Also in 1972, the group signed to Sire Records (who had already been releasing their records in the US since their second LP in 1969), distributed by Polydor, and albums issued in the 1970s saw them moving away from the blues somewhat to also incorporate funk and album-oriented rock (AOR) influences. Their 70s albums include: FM/Live (October 1973), a double set recorded at a 1 July 1973, concert at the Academy of Music in New York, and the studio LPs Sense of Direction (May 1974), Stamp Album (August 1975) and Gold Plated (October 1976), featuring the 1977 hit single "Couldn't Get It Right". The latter two albums were handled through their manager Miles Copeland's BTM label in the UK. But Copeland and the band would sever ties by 1977 and the group's label Sire Records became a subsidiary of Warner Bros. that same year. Copeland then sued the band but both parties quickly settled out of court for £100,000.

In the 1970s, the band's concerts in the US were attended by up to 20,000 people.

A previously unknown recording of a live performance was later released as Climax Blues Band/World Tour 1976 by the Major League Productions (MLP) record label.

Original member Richard Jones returned in early 1975 after finishing college and played on Stamp Album. He handled keyboards, guitar and switched with Holt on bass. But he left again by 1977.

In May 1977 keyboardist Peter Filleul (who had met the band the previous year while playing with an outfit called East of Eden) joined just before the group set off on a US tour. And the band released the album Shine On in April 1978.

After recording Real to Reel (May 1979) in Montserrat, the first band to use George Martin's AIR studios there, the band (spurred on by the record company, who were now looking for hit singles) began moving toward more of a pop-rock sound on their next album, Flying the Flag (September 1980), and its first single "Gotta Have More Love" dented the US charts at No. 47. By now, the band were appearing directly on the Warner Bros. label after it had completely absorbed Sire Records. Holt tells of the album's genesis:

"This was at the time when we had a six album deal with Warner Brothers. Everyone was writing songs to try and get theirs on. I had a little studio set up. When I say little, I mean one corner of a bedroom with a Fender Rhodes electric piano, a 4-track recorder, a very small drum kit, a few guitars and one microphone. I remember one night just going in there, I sat down at the piano, set the recorder and just started playing the intro and chords to "I Love You". I wrote the whole structure of the song in a couple of takes including the key change to the solo which I thought was quite clever how it came back to the bridge. I then played a rough feel on my very basic drum kit. Next I added the guitar solo which just seemed naturally what would fit. I played it by bending the strings, it wasn't a slide guitar. Then I put the bass on, sat down and out poured the lyrics, from nowhere. I then sang it and did all the harmonies myself. But the irony of "I Love You" is that I played it to the band and they didn't like it. I thought it was the best and most complete song I'd ever written. We had our producer John Ryan come to England from L.A. to run through the tracks for our next album. He was sent to pre-produce our songs and asked us if anyone had any more songs. I said, 'I have this one but the band doesn't like it.' I played my cassette recording for him and he loved it, even said he thought it was a hit. We arrived in L.A. to record the album at Sound City Studios. When it came to "I Love You", our producer got Nicky Hopkins to play the grand piano. So it was me at the Fender Rhodes piano, Nicky by my side at the grand and John Cuffley on drums. The three of us laid down the basic track. I then put on the bass, sang it and did all the harmonies, Pete Haycock played my guitar solo with his slide and Colin Cooper wasn't even on the track. Then the producer decided to get a string section on the track, which was the icing on the cake. Warner Brothers came to the album launch at the studio for the execs to have a listen. They all raved about "I Love You". They got behind it and it became a hit. Personally, I thought it just sounded incredible. Up until the Flying the Flag album, we used to split songwriting royalties four equal ways as we were all credited with writing songs. For this album, we had a meeting to discuss starting to have songwriting credit split separately. I lost the argument to keep it all the same as before and ended up gaining 100% of my own song. Ironic! When the song became a hit (also it was the start of me then becoming a lead singer which worried the others), we had a major US tour booked but both Colin and Pete didn't want to "go on the road to promote my career". So even with a song high up on the US charts, our SECOND "bite of the cherry", so to speak, they actually chose to cancel our US tour and not back me up instead of just being grateful for another hit. The record company was angry and basically stopped promoting our albums after that. I never got to tour and sing the song live so I feel slightly cheated out of performing it. But it became a really popular radio song and of course a lot of people fell in love because of it. I get emails all the time from people who actually got married because of it, even having it played as their "first dance" at their reception."

In 1981 the band was thinking of replacing Peter Filleul with a different keyboardist. But after that fell through, Filleul was hired back for a spring 1981 European tour but departed at the tour's conclusion that May.

The band, once more with producer John Ryan, continued pursuing a pop-rock direction on their next album Lucky for Some (September 1981).

That same year Climax's manager Tony Brinsley, who had managed them since 1977 after taking the reins from Miles Copeland, was suddenly let go in favor of Phil Banfield, who helped extricate them from Warners and got them signed to Virgin Records, where he had more influence. Plus, George Glover (from Cyril Dagworth Players) joined the band on keyboards and backing vocals in the fall of 1981 and has remained there ever since. But unhappy with Brinsley's termination and disillusioned with Cooper and Haycock's total lack of enthusiasm for "I Love You" and the cancelation of a US tour, Holt departed the group in April 1982 after a tour of the Far East, replaced briefly by John "Rhino" Edwards, then by Rob Rawlinson (formerly of Stan Webb's band) who filled in briefly for Edwards during a spring 1983 tour of Europe before "Rhino" returned that summer after a stint with Dexy's Midnight Runners.

Holt went on to join drummer Brendan Day and Nektar guitarist Roye Albrighton to record an album under the name Grand Alliance for the A&M label.

In the meantime, the Climax Blues Band's album Sample and Hold (March 1983) was being recorded for Virgin Records in late 1982, but the record's producer, John Eden, was not happy with John Cuffley's drumming, so the album ended up being made by a lineup of Haycock, Cooper and Glover, with a rhythm section composed of the session musicians Dave Markee (bass) and Henry Spinetti (drums). Cuffley and new bassist Tom Hardwell ended up stepping aside and on tour the rhythm section consisted of drummer Jeff Rich and the aforementioned Edwards, who both eventually went on to feature in Status Quo for many years.

But after Sample and Hold's lukewarm performance, Virgin dropped the act and Phil Banfield departed as their manager. A label called Nu Disk then showed interest in the group and a follow-up album was reportedly in the works, but Cooper decided to pass on the offer and the band temporarily ceased its activities after Haycock, annoyed at Cooper's decision, decided to bow out in late 1984.

In 1985 Haycock formed a band called Peter Haycock's Climax (featuring Haycock, Livingstone Brown on bass and backing vocals, Pete Thompson on drums and backing vocals and Iain Dunnet on keyboards, who was eventually replaced by Keff McCulloch on keyboards, guitar and backing vocals, then by Geoff Castle) and put out the album Total Climax on Nu Disk. This band toured extensively in Europe, including Communist East Germany, and conducted a well-received tour in Australia. Haycock was later asked by his former Climax Blues Band manager, Miles Copeland, to record an instrumental album, Guitar and Son, and the live album Night of the Guitars (from the 1989 tour of the same name, which included former bandmate Derek Holt on bass, keyboards and occasional vocals) for the I.R.S. No Speak label.

After that tour, Haycock teamed up with former Alice Cooper / Lou Reed guitarist Steve Hunter and Derek Holt to record the album H Factor. He was later recruited by Bev Bevan to become a member of Electric Light Orchestra Part II and recorded and toured with that group from 1990 to 1992. He also started his film score career at this time, playing the lead on Hans Zimmer's score to Thelma and Louise.

In 1986 Cooper and Glover reunited Climax Blues Band, recruiting guitarist Lester Hunt (from the heavy metal outfit Demon), original bassist Derek Holt and drummer Roy Adams (who had played with Steve Gibbons, Roy Wood and John Mayall, among others) to tour in the UK, Europe and America. These were the final tour dates with Holt, who left again at their conclusion.

During the mid-80s, the band worked periodically on a new Climax Blues Band album Drastic Steps, which was eventually released in 1988. This album featured Cooper, Glover and Hunt, and also included return appearances by bassist John "Rhino" Edwards and drummer Jeff Rich.

New bassist Roger Inniss joined the group in 1987 to replace Holt. Then Neil Simpson took over the bass slot in 1991.

Cooper turned the band back in a blues direction as they released the live album Blues from the Attic in 1994 and Big Blues in 2003. Big Blues, their first studio album in 17 years, consisted totally of Willie Dixon songs.

Colin Cooper died of cancer on 3 July 2008, aged 68. He was replaced in 2009 by singer/saxophone/harmonica player Johnny Pugh, who retired in 2012, and was replaced in turn by vocalist Graham Dee and saxophone player Chris Aldridge. Peter Haycock died on 30 October 2013 at age 62.

A new studio album, Hands of Time, was released in 2019.

In 2022 Lester Hunt announced his retirement from the band after 36 years for health reasons and his friend Dan Machin, who had already been filling in for him on the road, became Climax's permanent guitarist.

Scott Ralph, who had worked with a vast range of artists, including Robbie Williams, Engelbert Humperdinck, Nile Rodgers and Michael Bublé, joined the band in 2023, replacing Graham Dee as lead singer.

As of 2024 the band continues to tour without any remaining original members.

Drummer John Cuffley (born 20 September 1939) died from pancreatic cancer at Royal United Hospital in Bath, Somerset, on 11 June 2026, aged 86.

== Lineups ==
1968–1969	1969	1969–1972	1972–1975
Colin Cooper – vocals, saxophone, harmonica, guitar; Pete Haycock – guitar, vocals, bass; Derek Holt – guitar, bass, keyboards; Richard Jones – bass, keyboards; George Newsome – drums; Arthur Wood – keyboards	Colin Cooper – vocals, saxophone, harmonica, guitar; Pete Haycock – guitar, vocals, bass; Derek Holt – bass, guitar, keyboards; George Newsome – drums; Arthur Wood – keyboards	Colin Cooper – vocals, saxophone, harmonica, guitar; Pete Haycock – guitar, vocals, bass; Derek Holt – bass, guitar, keyboards; George Newsome – drums; Arthur Wood – keyboards; Anton Farmer – keyboards (left in 1970)	Colin Cooper – vocals, saxophone, harmonica, guitar; Pete Haycock – guitar, vocals, bass; Derek Holt – bass, guitar, keyboards, vocals; John Cuffley – drums
1975–1977	1977	1977–1981	1981
Colin Cooper – vocals, saxophone, harmonica, guitar; Pete Haycock – guitar, vocals, bass; Derek Holt – bass, guitar, keyboards, vocals; John Cuffley – drums; Richard Jones – keyboards, guitar, vocals	Colin Cooper – vocals, saxophone, harmonica, guitar; Pete Haycock – guitar, vocals, bass; Derek Holt – bass, guitar, keyboards, vocals; John Cuffley – drums	Colin Cooper – vocals, saxophone, harmonica, guitar; Pete Haycock – guitar, vocals, bass; Derek Holt – bass, guitar, keyboards, vocals; John Cuffley – drums; Peter Filleul – keyboards	Colin Cooper – vocals, saxophone, harmonica, guitar; Pete Haycock – guitar, vocals, bass; Derek Holt – bass, guitar, keyboards, vocals; John Cuffley – drums
1981–1982	1982–1983	1983–1984	1986
Colin Cooper – vocals, saxophone, harmonica, guitar; Pete Haycock – guitar, vocals, bass; Derek Holt – bass, guitar, keyboards, vocals; John Cuffley – drums; George Glover – keyboards, backing vocals	Colin Cooper – vocals, saxophone, harmonica, guitar; Pete Haycock – guitar, vocals, bass; George Glover – keyboards, backing vocals; John "Rhino" Edwards/Rob Rawlinson/Tom Hardwell – bass; John Cuffley – drums	Colin Cooper – vocals, saxophone, harmonica, guitar; Pete Haycock – guitar, vocals, bass; George Glover – keyboards, backing vocals; John "Rhino" Edwards – bass; Jeff Rich – drums	Colin Cooper – vocals, saxophone, harmonica, guitar; George Glover – keyboards, backing vocals; Roy Adams – drums; Lester Hunt – guitar, backing vocals; Derek Holt – bass, guitar, keyboards, vocals
1987–1991	1991–2008	2009–2012	2012–2022
Colin Cooper – vocals, saxophone, harmonica, guitar; George Glover – keyboards, backing vocals; Roy Adams – drums; Lester Hunt – guitar, backing vocals; Roger Inniss – bass	Colin Cooper – vocals, saxophone, harmonica, guitar; George Glover – keyboards, backing vocals; Roy Adams – drums; Lester Hunt – guitar, backing vocals; Neil Simpson – bass	George Glover – keyboards, backing vocals; Roy Adams – drums; Lester Hunt – guitar, backing vocals; Neil Simpson – bass; Johnny Pugh – vocals, saxophone, harmonica	George Glover – keyboards, backing vocals; Roy Adams – drums; Lester Hunt – guitar, backing vocals; Neil Simpson – bass; Graham Dee – vocals; Chris Aldridge – saxophone
2022–2023	2023–present
George Glover – keyboards, backing vocals; Roy Adams – drums; Neil Simpson – bass; Graham Dee – vocals; Chris Aldridge – saxophone; Dan Machin – guitar	George Glover – keyboards, backing vocals; Roy Adams – drums; Neil Simpson – bass; Chris Aldridge – saxophone; Dan Machin – guitar; Scott Ralph – vocals, trumpet, guitar

== Discography ==
=== Albums ===
Year	Title	Chart positions			
Year	Title	UK	AUS	CAN	US
1969	The Climax Chicago Blues Band	—	—	—	—
1969	Plays On	—	—	—	197
1970	A Lot of Bottle	—	—	—	—
1971	Tightly Knit	—	—	—	—
1972	Rich Man	—	—	—	150
1973	FM/Live	—	—	—	107
1974	Sense of Direction	—	—	33	37
1975	Stamp Album	—	—	—	69
1976	Gold Plated	56	—	45	27
1978	Shine On	—	—	59	71
1979	Real to Reel	—	—	—	170
1980	Flying the Flag	—	65	—	75
1981	Lucky for Some	—	—	—	—
1983	Sample and Hold	—	—	—	—
1988	Drastic Steps	—	—	—	—
1994	Blues from the Attic	—	—	—	—
1994	25 Years 1968–1993	—	—	—	—
2003	Big Blues	—	—	—	—
2011	Climax Blues Band World Tour 1976	—	—	—	—
2014	Security Alert: The Live Bootleg	—	—	—	—
2018	Tempus Fugit 4-track EP: Album Sampler	—	—	—	—
2019	Hands of Time	—	—	—	—
"—" denotes releases that did not chart or were not released in that territory.

=== Albums (guest appearance) ===
- Three's a Crowd, Tarney/Spencer Band (1978)

=== Singles ===
Year	Title	Chart positions					
Year	Title	UK	AUS	CAN	CAN AC	US	US AC
1969	"Like Uncle Charlie"	—	—	—	—	—	—
1971	"Cubano Chant"	—	—	—	—	—	—
1971	"Reap What I've Sowed"	—	—	—	—	—	—
1971	"Towards the Sun"	—	—	—	—	—	—
1972	"Mole on the Dole"	—	—	—	—	—	—
1973	"Shake Your Love"	—	—	—	—	—	—
1974	"Sense of Direction"	—	—	—	—	—	—
1975	"Using the Power"	—	—	—	—	—	—
1976	"Couldn't Get It Right"	10	—	8	38	3	43
1978	"Makin' Love"	—	—	—	—	91	—
1978	"Mistress Moonshine"	—	—	—	—	—	—
1979	"Children of the Night Time"	—	—	—	—	—	—
1980	"I Love You"	—	59	14	30	12	20
1980	"Gotta Have More Love"	—	77	—	—	47	—
1981	"Darlin'"	—	—	—	—	—	—
1982	"Friends in High Places"	—	—	—	—	—	—
1983	"Listen to the Night"	—	—	—	—	—	—
"—" denotes releases that did not chart or were not released in that territory.

== Other sources ==
- Nick Finnis; Rob Logan, eds. (1975). The New Musical Express Book of Rock. Star Books. ISBN 0-352-30074-4.
