= Good Machine =

Defunct American film production company

Good Machine Productions
- Industry: Independent film
- Founded: 1990; 36 years ago
- Founders: Ted Hope; James Schamus
- Defunct: 2003; 23 years ago
- Fate: Merged with USA Films and Universal Focus to form Focus Features
- Successors: Focus Features; This Is That Productions
- Headquarters: New York City, United States
- Products: Motion pictures
- Parent: Universal Studios (2002–2003)
- Divisions: Good Machine International

Good Machine Productions was an American independent film production, film distribution, and foreign sales company started in the early 1990 by its co-founders and producers, Ted Hope and James Schamus. David Linde joined as a partner in the late 1990s and also started the international sales company Good Machine International. They sold the company to Universal Pictures, where it was then merged with USA Films and Universal Focus to create Focus Features. Hope, along with the heads of production development and business affairs (Anthony Bregman, Anne Carey, and Diana Victor) then went on to form the independent production company This Is That Productions. Schamus and Linde became co-presidents of Focus Features.

In 2001, the Museum of Modern Art celebrated the tenth anniversary of Good Machine's work, commemorating their support of international and domestic filmmakers.

== Background ==
Good Machine was involved in production and/or distribution of a number of films, including Ang Lee's The Ice Storm and Ride with the Devil; Hal Hartley projects such as Flirt (1995), Edward Burns's The Brothers McMullen, Todd Solondz's Happiness, and Todd Field’s In the Bedroom.

== History ==
In 1997, it was announced that Good Machine would become the foreign sales agent of films produced and distributed by October Films, in order to acquire worldwide rights of the films. In 1998, it struck a deal with Universal. Previously, the company had a one-time production deal with 20th Century Fox, which was signed in 1996. It was dismantled in 2002, when it merged with Focus Features. In 2001, Good Machine struck a deal with Radar Pictures to finance and distribute their films for international releases. The deal was continued as Good Machine was absorbed into Focus.

== Disbandment ==
In 2002, Good Machine was acquired by Universal Pictures. James Schamus and David Linde remained with Universal, serving as co-presidents of Focus Features.

Ted Hope chose to part with the company to form the This is that Corporation (This Is That Productions) with Good Machine Director of Development Anne Carey, Director of Production Anthony Bregman, and Director of Business Affairs Diana Victor. Under the This Is That banner they produced films such as Adventureland, The Savages, and Eternal Sunshine of the Spotless Mind.

== Filmography ==
- The Hours and Times (1991) — US distribution
- Keep It for Yourself (1991) — co-produced with Allarts
- Pushing Hands (1991) ― co-produced with Central Motion Pictures
- Simple Men (1992) — co-produced with Fine Line Features
- The Wedding Banquet (1993) ― co-produced with Central Motion Pictures
- Eat Drink Man Woman (1994) ― co-produced with Central Motion Pictures
- What Happened Was (1994) — co-produced with Genre Films
- The Brothers McMullen (1995) – co-produced with Videography Prods.
- Flirt (1995)
- Safe (1995) — co-produced with American Playhouse and Channel Four Films
- She's the One (1996) — co-produced with Marlboro Road Gang Productions and South Fork Pictures
- Walking and Talking (1996) — co-produced with Channel Four Films, Zenith Productions, Pandora Film, PolyGram Filmed Entertainment, Makido Films (France), Electric, and TEAM Communications Group
- Arresting Gena (1997) – co-produced with Kardana/Swinsky Films
- The Ice Storm (1997)
- The Myth of Fingerprints (1997) — Sony Pictures Classics
- Office Killer (1997) — co-produced with Strand, Kardana/Swinsky Films, and Good Fear
- The Sticky Fingers of Time (1997) – co-produced with Crystal Pictures
- Happiness (1998) — Good Machine Releasing
- No Looking Back (1998) — co-produced with Polygram Filmed Entertainment Group, Marlboro Road Gang, and South Fork Pictures
- Xiu Xiu: The Sent Down Girl (1998) — Good Machine International
- Bride of Chucky (1998) — Good Machine International
- The Last Days (1998) – Good Machine International; co-produced with October Films
- The Naked Man (1999) – Good Machine International
- The Lifestyle (1999) — co-produced with Swinging T Productions
- Ride with the Devil (1999) — co-produced with USA Films
- The Muse (1999) – Good Machine International; co-produced with October Films
- Trick (1999) — co-produced with Fine Line Features
- Three Seasons (1999) – Good Machine International; co-produced with October Films
- Cherry Falls (1999) – Good Machine International
- A Conversation with Gregory Peck (1999) – Good Machine International
- This Year's Love (1999) – Good Machine International
- Crouching Tiger, Hidden Dragon (2000) — Good Machine International; co-produced with Columbia Pictures Film Production Asia, Asian Union Film & Entertainment, China Film Co-Productions Corporation, Edko Films, and Zoom Hunt Productions
- The Tao of Steve (2000) — Sony Pictures Classics
- The King Is Alive (2000) – Good Machine International; co-produced with Newmarket Capital Group
- Walk the Talk (2000) – Good Machine International
- Buffalo Soldiers (2001) — co-produced with FilmFour, Grosvenor Park Productions, and Odeon Film
- Human Nature (2001) — co-produced with StudioCanal
- In the Bedroom (2001) — co-produced with Eastern Standard Film Company and GreeneStreet Films
- Lovely & Amazing (2001) — co-produced with Blow Up Pictures
- The Man Who Wasn't There (2001) — co-produced with Working Title Films, Gramercy Pictures, Mike Zoss Productions, and Constantin Film
- Series 7: The Contenders (2001) – Good Machine International; co-produced with Blow Up Pictures
- Storytelling (2001) — co-produced with Killer Films and New Line Cinema
- Y tu mamá también (2001) — Good Machine International
- Adaptation (2002) — co-produced with Columbia Pictures, Intermedia, and Propaganda Films
- The Laramie Project (2002) — co-produced with HBO Films
- Talk to Her (2002) – co-produced with El Deseo
- American Splendor (2003) — co-produced with Fine Line Features, Dark Horse Entertainment, and HBO Films
- Hulk (2003) — co-produced with Universal Pictures, Marvel Enterprises, and Valhalla Motion Pictures
- Laurel Canyon (2003) – co-produced with Sony Pictures Classics
