= Ted Hope =

American film producer

- Born: 1962 (age 63–64); United States
- Education: NYU Film School, New York University Tisch School of the Arts
- Occupation: Film producer
- Years active: 1987—present
- Known for: Good Machine (1990–2002); This Is That Productions (2002–2010)
- Spouse: Vanessa Hope
- Website: HopeForFilm.com

Ted Hope (born 1962) is an American independent film producer based in New York City. He is best known for co-founding the production/sales company Good Machine, where he produced the first films of such filmmakers as Ang Lee, Nicole Holofcener, Todd Field, Michel Gondry, Moisés Kaufman, and Shari Springer Berman and Robert Pulcini. Hope then co-founded This is That with several associates from Good Machine. He later worked at the San Francisco Film Society and Amazon Studios.

Among Hope's twenty-three Sundance entries, are three Grand Jury Prize winners: American Splendor (2003), The Brothers McMullen (1995) and What Happened Was... (1994). American Splendor also won the FIPRESCI Award at the 2003 Cannes Film Festival, the Critics prize at the 2003 Deauville Film Festival, and was nominated for five Spirit Awards and one Academy Award. Hope has also produced two Sundance Opening Night selections: Nicole Holofcener's Friends with Money (2006) and Moises Kaufman's The Laramie Project (2002), which was nominated for five Emmys.

In 2013, IndieWire named Hope to its inaugural list of Influencers. The Hollywood Reporter cited Hope and his partners at This is That among the twenty-five most powerful people in the Independent Film business.

== Early life ==
Hope attended the undergraduate film program at New York University. He met his frequent collaborator and former business partner Anne Carey on his first day there. After graduating, Hope worked as a production assistant for approximately three years, while also working as a script reader for New Line and MGM.

Hope advanced from work as a Production Assistant to Assistant Directing and Production Management. During that time he started to identify projects and filmmakers he wanted to work with. Most notably Hope started working with Hal Hartley in the years prior to their first production. Hope's first productions were Hartley's The Unbelievable Truth and Trust, on which he is credited as First Assistant Director and Line Producer, respectively.

== Career ==
=== The Good Machine ===
In 1990, Hope and James Schamus founded Good Machine, an independent film production company based in New York. They started doing line production for hire for Claire Denis, Dani Levy, and Jan Schutte. At Good Machine, Hope and James Schamus produced Ang Lee's early films including Pushing Hands, The Wedding Banquet and Eat Drink Man Woman (both Academy Award nominees), The Ice Storm, and Ride with the Devil.

Hope produced Todd Solondz's Cannes Critics' Prize-winning Happiness, which Hope and his partners at Good Machine released themselves when its distributor dropped the film. Hope also executive produced Todd Field's In the Bedroom, which earned five Academy Award nominations for Best Picture, Best Actress, Best Actor, Best Supporting Actress, and Best Adapted Screenplay. Hope and Schamus brought David Linde in as a partner to Good Machine, in order to start their foreign sales arm, Good Machine International. In 2000, the Museum of Modern Art honored Good Machine with a retrospective. In 2002, Universal Studios acquired Good Machine and combined it with USA Films to form Focus Features, a new specialty film unit. James Schamus and David Linde were named to run the new unit.

=== This is That ===
With fellow Good Machine producers Anne Carey and Anthony Bregman, and head of business affairs Diana Victor, Hope co-founded New York production company This is That in 2002. This is That's first release, 21 Grams, received two Academy Award nominations and five BAFTA nominations. The company's second release, Eternal Sunshine of the Spotless Mind, won an Academy Award for Best Original Screenplay. Hope's production of Alan Ball's feature film directorial debut, Towelhead, marked his 18th production of a first time feature film director. In 2010, the company released The American, which opened at No. 1 at the US box office on opening week, and completed Super, written and directed by James Gunn, which was the first film to sell that year at the Toronto International Film Festival. After producing seventeen films, the company closed its doors in September 2010 citing financial struggles with maintaining the office space. Hope hinted that he and Carey could possibly produce together again in the future.

=== San Francisco Film Society directorship ===
On August 8, 2012, the San Francisco Film Society named Hope as executive director of SFFS effective September 1. He began work in mid-September, 2012. Upon taking the position, Hope stated that it was an offer he could not refuse: “to save Indie Film and build it better than it has been before.” Moving away from project-specific producing, Hope turned his focus on improving infrastructure. Hope announced he would resign as executive director at the end of 2013, citing the challenges of working with a staff of 26 and a board. He said he planned to remain in the San Francisco Bay Area and lead the Film Society's advisory board. In March 2014, Noah Cowen, former director of the Toronto International Film Festival, took over as executive director of the SFFS.

=== Amazon Studios ===
On January 8, 2014, Hope was named CEO of Fandor, a subscription online service for independent and international films. He left Fandor at the beginning of 2015 to become the head of production for Amazon Original Movies, stating, "To help carry the torch into the feature film world for such an innovative company is a tremendous opportunity and responsibility. Amazon Original Movies will be synonymous with films that amaze, excite, and move our fans, wherever customers watch." After July 2018 he served as the co-head of movies for the studio under Jennifer Salke.

Amazon has released 38 films since 2016, notably winning three Academy Awards in the studio's first year as a distributor for titles Manchester by the Sea and The Salesman. In May 2020, Salke announced that Hope had stepped down from his role as co-head of movies to go back to being an independent producer. Hope made a first-look deal with Amazon that began on June 2, 2020.

=== Arizona State University ===
In 2021, he joined Arizona State University as professor in the Sidney Poitier New American Film School's Masters program.

=== Double Hope Films ===
Double Hope Films is a production company founded by independent film producer Ted Hope and his wife Vanessa Hope in 2010. Double Hope's first film, Dark Horse premiered at the Venice Film Festival in 2011, and the company's sophomore effort, Starlet, premiered at the South by Southwest Film Festival in 2012. In 2023, Invisible Nation premiered at the Woodstock Film Festival.

== MPAA campaign ==
Hope was instrumental in organizing the successful 2003 antitrust campaign against the MPAA and its ban on screeners including testifying in court. Although the MPAA head, Jack Valenti, claimed The Screen Ban was about combating piracy, it was recognized by the court as stifling competition.

== Filmography ==
He was a producer in all films unless otherwise noted.

=== Film ===
Year	Film	Director	Credit
1988	Doom Asylum	Richard Friedman	Associate producer
1989	An Unremarkable Life	Amin Q. Chaudhri	Associate producer
1990	Trust	Hal Hartley	Line producer
1991	I Was on Mars		Line producer
1991	Pushing Hands	Ang Lee	Executive producer
1991	Surviving Desire	Hal Hartley	
1992	Simple Men	Hal Hartley	
1993	The Wedding Banquet	Ang Lee	
1994	What Happened Was	Tom Noonan	Executive producer
1994	Bye Bye America		Line producer
1994	Eat Drink Man Woman	Ang Lee	Associate producer
1994	Amateur	Hal Hartley	
1994	Roy Cohn/Jack Smith		
1995	The Brothers McMullen	Edward Burns	Executive producer
1995	Safe	Todd Haynes	Executive producer
1995	Flirt	Hal Hartley	
1996	Walking and Talking	Nicole Holofcener	
1996	She's the One	Edward Burns	
1996	What About Me?		
1997	Arresting Gena	Hannah Weyer	
1997	The Myth of Fingerprints	Bart Freundlich	Executive producer
1997	The Ice Storm	Ang Lee	
1997	Office Killer	Cindy Sherman	Executive producer
1997	The Sticky Fingers of Time	Hilary Brougher	Executive producer
1997	Love God	Frank Grow	Executive producer
1997	Monsters		Executive producer
1998	No Looking Back	Edward Burns	
1998	Happiness	Todd Solondz	
1998	Luminous Motion	Bette Gordon	
1999	Ride with the Devil	Ang Lee	
2000	The Tao of Steve	Jenniphr Goodman	Executive producer
2001	In the Bedroom	Todd Field	Executive producer
2001	Storytelling	Todd Solondz	
2001	Human Nature	Michel Gondry	
2001	Lovely & Amazing	Nicole Holofcener	
2003	American Splendor	Shari Springer Berman & Robert Pulcini	
2003	21 Grams	Alejandro González Iñárritu	Executive producer
2004	The Door in the Floor	Tod Williams	
2004	A Dirty Shame	John Waters	
2005	Thumbsucker	Mike Mills	Executive producer
2006	Friends with Money	Nicole Holofcener	Executive producer
2006	The Hawk Is Dying	Julian Goldberger	Executive producer
2006	Fay Grim	Hal Hartley	Executive producer
2006	The Ex	Jesse Peretz	
2007	The Savages	Tamara Jenkins	
2007	Towelhead	Alan Ball	
2009	Adventureland	Greg Mottola	
2010	Super	James Gunn	
2011	Martha Marcy May Marlene	Sean Durkin	Executive producer
2011	Collaborator	Martin Donovan	Executive producer
2011	Dark Horse	Todd Solondz	
2012	Starlet	Sean Baker	Executive producer
2016	A Kind of Murder	Andy Goddard	
2020	Francesco	Evgeny Afineevsky	Executive producer
2021	Who We Are: A Chronicle of Racism in America	Emily Kunstler & Sarah Kunstler	Executive producer
2021	The Tender Bar	George Clooney	
2022	Freedom on Fire: Ukraine's Fight for Freedom	Evgeny Afineevsky	
2022	Jerry Brown: The Disruptor	Marina Zenovich	Executive producer
2023	Cassandro	Roger Ross Williams	
2023	Invisible Nation	Vanessa Hope	
2024	The Black Sea	Crystal Moselle & Derrick B. Harden	
TBA	Lone Wolf	Mark Pellington	

Second unit director or assistant director

Year	Film	Role
1989	The Unbelievable Truth	First assistant director
1990	Basket Case 2	Assistant director
1990	Frankenhooker	First assistant director
1990	Trust	First assistant director
1991	Blowback	Assistant director

Production manager

Year	Film
1988	Doom Asylum
1991	I Was on Mars

Miscellaneous crew

Year	Film	Notes
1986	Sid and Nancy	Production assistant
1986	Hotshot	Key production assistant
1988	Tiger Warsaw	Assistant to producer

As an actor

Year	Film	Role
1991	I Was on Mars	None

=== Television ===
Year	Title	Credit	Notes
1992	Punch and Judy Got Divorced		Television film
2002	The Laramie Project	Executive producer	Television film

Second unit director or assistant director

Year	Title	Role
1990−91	Monsters	Assistant director
