= Aesha Waks =

American actress

Aesha Hash Waks is an American actress born and raised in New York City.

== Early life and education ==
Waks was born to Israel and Mindy Waks. She is of Israeli, German, Russian, and Polish descent but considers herself spiritual. Waks's father works in fashion and interior installation. Her mother, Mindy, was a full-time artist. Her parents named her after Stevie Wonder's song "Aisha". Her brother, Geffen Waks, is a hip-hop artist.

Waks guest starred in WWOR-TV’s Romper Room at age five and sang the national anthem at Shea Stadium for the New York Mets at age seven. Waks got her SAG card by skating in a Honey Combs commercial and went on to do many more commercials including Levis, Buffalino Boots and Microsoft. Waks then performed in a number of television guest spots including New York Undercover, City Kids, Third Watch, and Late Night with Conan O'Brien.

Waks studied drama at Fiorello H. LaGuardia High School. As a high school student, Waks was also a professional choreographer and world tour dancer for Reel 2 Real and made appearances in music videos for Wu-Tang Clan ("Oh God"), Elton John ("Believe"), and Tag Team ("Whoomp There It Is"). During that time, Waks was paying for her Broadway dance school lessons by performing as a cage dancer for the Palladium and The Limelight.

Waks attended Kingsborough Community College and earned a Bachelor of Science in media and communication from the Steinhardt School of Culture, Education, and Human Development at New York University.

== Career ==
Waks currently got rediscovered as the bubble gum girl from Teenage Mutant Ninja Turtles. She just released an album entitled Memoirs of an Aesha through Sony Orchard. Aesha is also a pro round card model for boxers at Madison square garden and petite model. Recently acted in horror films, Hellbound Covent and The Lords Valley. In Aesha’s earlier career she appeared in films including A Brother's Kiss (1997), Went to Coney Island on a Mission from God... Be Back by Five (1998), A Packing Suburbia (1999), Remedy (2005), Priceless (2008), Night Stream (2013) with Andre Joseph, and The Bad Apple, which featured Waks on a billboard campaign for Lydia Leung between Canal and Lafayette St. in New York City. Waks cameoed in the internet comedy series, POYKPAC, for Ryan Hunter. She also helped produce in a music video for Riff Raff and also had cameo roles in the music videos for "Midnight Sprite" and "Bo Jackson Freestyle". Waks, also a singer and songwriter, performed her self-entitled song "Fun Dip" on Fuse TV and appeared in her music video "Neck Bop" which was produced by Al McDowell and featured a cameo by Miri Ben-Ari. Aesha recently co-starred in the fourth episode of Gotham for Warner Bros. Television on the Fox Network.

Waks is the host of the Women in Fashion and Film Festival. She has also worked closely hosting with Chance TV. Waks is known for her cover and centerfold on High Times magazine which was also featured in Playboy magazine. She has also been in Maxim and the cover of Lifestyles Magazine. She appeared in runway shows such as Lincoln Center Fashion Week for Popluxe by Richie Rich as well as Skrapper, Chong Cha, Allen & Suzi, Patricia Fields, and various others. In 2013, Waks made a guest appearance on XOX Betsey Johnson on the Style Network.

Waks has also worked behind the scenes for MTV as a crowd hyper and casting director and as a production assistant for The Andy Milonakis Show (2005), an associate producer on Good Humor (2002), and When the Devil Comes (2013).

Waks has been appearing on page six of the New York Post since the release of her movie "A Packing Suburbia" in 1999. Most recently with her former fiancé, Liam McMullan, son of photographer Patrick McMullan. The couple had a band called Danger who recorded the song "Bad Press" produced by Michael Jackson's protege, Eddy Cascio.

== Awards ==
Waks studied at the Lee Strasberg Theatre and Film Institute, Bill Esper Studios, Upright Citizens Brigade Theatre, and Centerstage. Waks has starred and co-starred in over 40 films and won two best actress awards at the Olympia Film Festival including best actress for the title role of Gena in Arresting Gena (1997), co-starring Adrian Grenier, Sam Rockwell, Brendan Sexton III, Summer Phoenix, Paul Giamatti, Rini Bell, Heather Matarazzo; produced by Goodmachine directed by Hannah Weyer) and two French Avignon Film festival best actress for lead role Rayna in the film Money Shot (1996) costarring Stephen Lang and Tamara Tunie.

== Filmography ==
=== Film ===
Year	Title	Role	Notes
1990	Teenage Mutant Ninja Turtles	Bubble Gum Girl	Uncredited
1996	Celtic Pride	Waitress	Uncredited
1997	Arresting Gena	Gena	
1997	A Brother's Kiss	Young Lex's Girlfriend	
1998	Went to Coney Island on a Mission from God... Be Back by Five	Cindy Goldclang	
1998	One Deadly Road	Danielle	
1999	A Packing Suburbia	Celeste	
2000	Wannabes	Stephanie	
2002	White Boy	Waitress	
2002	The Brooklyn Boys	Cocktail Waitress	
2002	Good Humor: The Movie 2001	Dena	
2003	The Undertaker's Dozen	Belle	
2005	Remedy	Johnny's Girl	
2005	Tinsel Town	Bartender	
2005	Rose Woes and Joe's	Hooker	
2005	Lovesick	Sharon	
2008	The Drum Beats Twice	Alice	
2008	Priceless	Jenny	
2017	When the Devil Comes	Sister Claire	
2017	Smoke Screen	Emma Pierce	

=== Television ===
Year	Title	Role	Notes
1992	The Grind	Dancer	Episode #1.4
1993	CityKids	Marisol	Episode: "The Curse of Ali Baba"
1999	Third Watch	Fran	Episode: "Anywhere But Here"
2014	Gotham	Co-Worker	Episode: "Arkham"
