= This Is That Productions =

Former American film production company

- Industry: Independent film
- Predecessors: Good Machine; Propaganda Films
- Founded: 2002; 24 years ago
- Founders: Ted Hope; Anthony Bregman; Anne Carey; Diana Victor
- Defunct: 2010; 16 years ago
- Successor: Double Hope Films
- Headquarters: New York City, U.S.A.
- Products: Motion pictures

This Is That Productions (also known as This is that corporation) was an independent feature film production companies. Established in 2002, and based in New York City, the company was founded and fully owned by Ted Hope, Anne Carey, Anthony Bregman, and Diana Victor. The four partners previously worked together at the groundbreaking Good Machine, which Ted Hope co-founded in 1991.

The partners at This Is That were responsible for over fifty feature films. In addition to their seven Academy Award nominations their films received eighteen Independent Spirit Award nominations. Three of their films won the Grand Jury Prize at the Sundance Film Festival.

== History ==
In 1981, Hope and Carey met on their first day as undergrad transfer student's to NYU's Tisch School of the Arts; Carey later came on board Good Machine. In 1999, Diana Victor came to run Business Affairs at Good Machine; she has worked with Hope & Carey ever since. When Good Machine was sold to Universal, they formed This Is That together. The company had a deal with Focus Features for a multi-year, first-look pact. Two years later, the company had signed a deal with Svensk Filmindustri for a three-year output deal in Scandinavia.

This Is That's initial production was 21 Grams directed by Alejandro González Iñárritu and written by Guillermo Arriaga. The film stars Sean Penn, Naomi Watts and Benicio del Toro.

This Is That's second year brought Eternal Sunshine of the Spotless Mind written by Charlie Kaufman, directed by Michel Gondry, and starring Jim Carrey and Kate Winslet; The Door in the Floor, based on a novel by John Irving, written for the screen and directed by Tod Williams, and starring Jeff Bridges and Kim Basinger; and John Waters' A Dirty Shame, produced along with Killer Films.

This Is That's production of Mike Mills' Thumbsucker premiered at the 2005 Sundance Film Festival and Berlin International Film Festival. Lou Taylor Pucci was awarded the Special Jury Prize at both festivals for his performance. Another This Is That production in competition at the 2005 Sundance Film Festival was Jeff Feuerzeig's documentary The Devil and Daniel Johnston, which won Best Director for a documentary at the festival.

In 2006, Sony Pictures Classics released This Is That's Nicole Holofcener-directed Friends with Money, starring Jennifer Aniston, Catherine Keener, Frances McDormand and Joan Cusack. The film, which was the opening night selection at the 2006 Sundance Film Festival, was Sony Pictures Classic's highest grossing film that year. Anthony Bregman left along with a co-worker to start his own production company Likely Story.

2007 was also a busy year for This Is That. The Savages, directed by Tamara Jenkins, and starring Laura Linney and Philip Seymour Hoffman was nominated for two Academy Awards including Best Actress and Best Screenplay. Hal Hartley's Fay Grim premiered at the Toronto Film Festival and was also featured at the Sundance, Berlin, London and San Sebastian film festivals. The film stars Parker Posey and Jeff Goldblum. The Ex, produced with 2929 Entertainment, was written by David Guion & Michael Handelman and directed by Jesse Peretz. The film stars Zach Braff, Amanda Peet, Jason Bateman, Charles Grodin and Mia Farrow. The Hawk Is Dying, starring Paul Giamatti premiered at Sundance and Cannes.

Fall of 2008 kicked off with the release of This Is That's production, Towelhead, Oscar-winner Alan Ball's feature film directorial debut, which premiered at both Toronto and Sundance and stars Aaron Eckhart, Toni Collette, and Maria Bello. It is the final release by Warner Independent. Trainwreck: My Life as an Idiot, written and directed by Tod Harrison Williams and starring Seann William Scott, Gretchen Mol, and Jeff Garlin, was released later that year.

In both 2007 & 2008, the This Is That producer team were named to The Hollywood Reporter's Indie Power List.

This Is That completed production on Adventureland, by writer/director Greg Mottola (Superbad), which stars Jesse Eisenberg, Kristen Stewart, Ryan Reynolds, and Bill Hader. The film, a joint effort for Miramax and Sidney Kimmel Entertainment, was released in 2009 and earned award nominations at three festivals.

With at least two films being released each year since their creation in 2004, This Is That also made, in association with Likely Story and This Is That's former partner Anthony Bregman, Carriers, written and directed by brothers Alex and David Pastor, and Sleep Dealer, a Spanish-language science-fiction romance from writer-director Alex Rivera that won the Best Screenplay award at the 2008 Sundance Film Festival.

=== Closure ===
The company closed in 2010 after having the No. 1 film at the US box office (The American) and the first film to sell that year at the Toronto International Film Festival (Super).

== Filmography ==
- Collaborator (2011)
- Martha Marcy May Marlene (2011)
- The American (2010)
- Super (2010)
- Carriers (2009)
- Adventureland (2009)
- Sleep Dealer (2008)
- Towelhead (2007)
- The Savages (2007)
- Trainwreck: My Life as an Idoit (2007)
- The Ex (2006)
- Fay Grim (2006)
- The Hawk Is Dying (2006)
- Friends with Money (2006)
- Thumbsucker (2005)
- The Devil and Daniel Johnston (2005)
- A Dirty Shame (2004)
- The Door in the Floor (2004)
- Eternal Sunshine of the Spotless Mind (2004)
- 21 Grams (2003)
