= A Dirty Shame =

2004 film by John Waters

- Theatrical release poster
- Directed by: John Waters
- Written by: John Waters
- Produced by: Christine Vachon; Ted Hope
- Starring: Tracey Ullman; Johnny Knoxville; Selma Blair; Chris Isaak
- Cinematography: Steve Gainer
- Edited by: Jeffrey Wolf
- Music by: George S. Clinton
- Production companies: This is that; Killer Films; John Wells Productions; City Lights Pictures
- Distributed by: Fine Line Features
- Release dates: September 12, 2004 (TIFF); September 17, 2004 (Baltimore); September 24, 2004 (North America)
- Running time: 89 minutes
- Country: United States
- Language: English
- Budget: $15 million
- Box office: $1.9 million

A Dirty Shame is a 2004 American satirical sex comedy film written and directed by John Waters and starring Tracey Ullman, Johnny Knoxville, Selma Blair, and Chris Isaak. It follows a community in suburban Baltimore divided between people with highly conservative attitudes towards sexuality, and those who have been turned into sex addicts after experiencing concussions.

After premiering at the 2004 Toronto International Film Festival, A Dirty Shame was released in the United States on September 17, 2004. The film received mixed reviews from critics. Due to its sexual themes and content, it received an NC-17 rating from the Motion Picture Association of America, which limited the scope of its release and marketing, and it grossed $1.5 million domestically. Due to its poor box office performance, the film has stood as Waters' last directorial effort to date.

== Plot ==
The people of Harford Road are firmly divided into two camps: the neuters, the puritanical residents who despise anything even remotely carnal; and the perverts, a group of sex addicts whose unique fetishes have all been brought to the fore by accidental concussions. Repressed Sylvia Stickles finds herself firmly entrenched in the former camp.

Sylvia's promiscuous daughter Caprice, a go-go dancer at a local biker dive-bar, the Holiday House, performs under the stage name "Ursula Udders" because of her very large double-U cup breast implants and has a penchant for indecent exposure.

One day, after leaving Caprice locked up over the garage, under house arrest "for her own good", Sylvia is smacked on the head by a passing car and meets Ray-Ray Perkins, a local mechanic and self-styled "sex saint" who opens her mind to a whole new world of sensual pleasure, as he and his followers search for the ultimate sex act.

Eventually, through a series of bizarre head knockings, everyone in the Harford Road area of Baltimore becomes a sex addict, as Ray-Ray shoots semen out of his head and becomes the messiah of "Let's Go Sexin'!"

== Cast ==
- Tracey Ullman as Sylvia Stickles
- Johnny Knoxville as Ray-Ray Perkins
- Selma Blair as Caprice "Ursula Udders" Stickles
- Chris Isaak as Vaughn Stickles
- Suzanne Shepherd as "Big" Ethel
- Mink Stole as Marge The Neuter
- Patricia Hearst as Paige
- Jackie Hoffman as Dora
- Wes Johnson as "Fat Fuck" Frank
- Paul DeBoy as Wendell Doggett
- Mary Vivian Pearce as Nonjudgmental Ex-Sex Addict
- Jean Hill as Woman on Fire Escape
- James Ransone as "Dingy" Dave
- Gaelan Alexander Connell as Horny Kid
- Channing Wilroy as Male Motorist
- Alan J. Wendl as Officer Alvin
- Jewel Orem as "Loose" Linda
- Jonas Grey as Warren the Mailman
- Susan Rome as "Messy" Melinda
- David A. Dunham as "Mama Bear"
- Dave Moretti as "Papa Bear"
- Jeffrey Auerbach as "Baby Bear"
- David DeBoy as Dr. Arlington
- Ty Ford as Taxi Cab Driver
- Rosemary Knower as Female Motorist
- Doug Roberts as Driving Neuter Husband
- Bob Adams as Bus Passenger
- George Figgs (uncredited) as Neuter
- Ricki Lake (cameo) as herself
- David Hasselhoff (cameo) as himself

== Production ==
John Waters decided to make the film after discovering several sexual slang terms and branches existed on the internet, explaining the groups and terminology found in the film. The film was shot entirely on-location in Baltimore on Harford Road which is prominently featured in the film. In a featurette on the DVD, veteran stage actress Suzanne Shepherd recalled that when she was cast as Big Ethel, she was completely unfamiliar with Waters' work and she had no idea what to expect when she showed up for the first script review. Horrified by what she was reading, she became so distraught that she began to cry. She tried to quit the project but Waters and her cast mates managed to persuade her to stay. Paul Giamatti was originally slated to play Vaughn Stickles, but dropped out before filming began.

The film received an NC-17 rating from the Motion Picture Association of America (MPAA). This caused the film's distribution to be severely limited, as most major theater chains don't show NC-17 rated films while media outlets are reluctant to carry advertising for these movies. When Waters asked what he would need to cut for them to give his film an R rating, he was told that the ratings board "stopped taking notes." After Waters unsuccessfully attempted to appeal the rating, the film was released with the NC-17 classification.

== Reception ==
A Dirty Shame received mixed reviews from critics, with its explicitness both lauded and lampooned. On the review aggregator website Rotten Tomatoes, the film holds an approval rating of 55% based on 113 reviews, with an average rating of 5.7/10. The website's critics consensus reads, "John Waters casts his provocative eye towards libido in a sex satire that won't leave audiences feeling too Dirty, but this sophomoric farce doesn't strike a nerve like his best work – a real Shame." On Metacritic, the film has a weighted average score of 56 out of 100, based on 34 critics, indicating "mixed or average" reviews.

One of the more positive reviews came from Kevin Thomas of the Los Angeles Times, who wrote

A gross-out pioneer, Waters has always had more on his mind than delirious, sex-crazed silliness. By allowing people to speak freely about their sexual urges and practices with a bluntness that is jaw-droppingly hilarious, Waters has drawn deeply upon comedy's liberating power. The more the sex addicts talk about their hang-ups the more comically harmless they seem, and thus it's all the more absurd for the puritanical to try to punish them for their various pursuits of pleasure. Waters has always harnessed poor taste to lampoon attempts to limit freedom of expression. This raucously gritty and high-spirited film could scarcely be bluer in terms of the language, but from Waters it comes as a gust of fresh air.

Also enthusiastic was Peter Travers of Rolling Stone, who wrote:

A Dirty Shame is Waters unleashed, and wicked, kinky fun for anyone except the twits who rated it NC-17...You may even shed a tear when Sylvia bonds with her daughter by confessing, "I'm a cunnilingus bottom." OK, the jokes are hit-and-miss and the plot is nonexistent, but the Waters spirit stays consistently and sweetly twisted. When the cast takes to the streets singing, "Let's go sexin'", you want to cheer them on.

On the other end of the spectrum was Roger Ebert, who gave the film one star out of a possible four, writing:

There is in show biz something known as "a bad laugh". That's the laugh you don't want to get, because it indicates not amusement but incredulity, nervousness or disapproval. John Waters' A Dirty Shame is the only comedy I can think of that gets more bad laughs than good ones...We go to a Waters film expecting bad taste, but we also expect to laugh, and A Dirty Shame is monotonous, repetitive and sometimes wildly wrong in what it hopes is funny.

=== Box office ===
A Dirty Shame opened on September 17, 2004, on one Baltimore screen and grossed $29,384 for the weekend. The next weekend, it expanded to 133 venues, where it grossed $448,914 ($3,375 per screen). It grossed a total of $1,339,668 in the United States and Canada. Overseas, the film grossed an additional $574,498 (as of July 14, 2005), making its global box office total come to $1.9 million.

== Home media ==
The film was released on DVD on June 14, 2005. It was issued in its original NC-17 version and in an edited, R-rated cut sold through Blockbuster, Wal-Mart and Best Buy as well as Target dubbed "The Neuter Version". The R-rated version is heavily censored and removes most of the profanities including altered dialogue such as "sex toy". Additionally, a scene in which two characters stand naked in their doorway is replaced by one in which the characters are clothed. In an interview, Waters stated that this version is "essentially for brainless people and 'really weird collectors'".

Netflix claimed to stream the NC-17 version but for a time, it was the censored version. It has since replaced it with the uncensored cut. A heavily censored version aired on LOGO, a cable channel for gay interest. Despite several internet sites and even the spine of the DVD stating that it is "The Neuter Version", the Australian release of the film is the NC-17 version with all profanity and nudity intact. It is rated R18+ for "sexual references and adult themes".
