= Carriers (film) =

- Promotional film poster
- Directed by: Àlex Pastor; David Pastor
- Written by: Àlex Pastor; David Pastor
- Produced by: Anthony Bregman; Ray Angelic
- Starring: Lou Taylor Pucci; Chris Pine; Piper Perabo; Emily VanCamp; Christopher Meloni
- Cinematography: Benoît Debie
- Edited by: Craig McKay
- Music by: Peter Nashel; Brick Garner
- Production companies: Paramount Vantage; Likely Story; This is that
- Distributed by: Paramount Pictures
- Release date: September 4, 2009 (United States)
- Running time: 85 minutes
- Country: United States
- Language: English
- Box office: $5.8 million

Carriers is a 2009 American post-apocalyptic horror film written and directed by Àlex and David Pastor. It stars Lou Taylor Pucci, Chris Pine, Piper Perabo, and Emily VanCamp as four survivors of a viral pandemic attempting to stay alive amid the looming threat of becoming infected. Filmed in 2006, it received a limited release in the United States on September 4, 2009, following Pine's breakout performance in Star Trek earlier that year. It received positive reviews from critics and grossed $5.8 million.

== Plot ==
A highly infectious virus, known as "The World Ender Virus", has spread worldwide, killing most of the population. Brothers Brian and Danny, along with Brian's girlfriend Bobby and Danny's friend Kate, plot a trip to take shelter at Turtle Beach, Texas, the brothers' childhood vacation home. To help them survive, they follow a set of safety rules created by Brian.

On their way to the beach, the group encounter survivor Frank and his infected daughter Jodie, whose vehicle has run out of fuel. The four escape from Frank when he attacks them, but after their car breaks down, they are forced to help Frank and Jodie to use his vehicle. At Frank's insistence, they travel to a nearby high school where a serum for the pandemic is rumored to have been developed. Upon arriving, Frank, Brian, Danny, and Kate discover that the serum does not work and the last remaining doctor is preparing to euthanize a group of infected children and himself. Meanwhile, Bobby catches the virus from Jodie, which she hides from the others. Frank is later forced to bring Jodie to a portable toilet, giving Brian the opportunity to leave them behind and take their vehicle.

The group stops at a hotel, unaware that it is occupied by armed survivalists. When the survivalists return, they force the women to accompany them until they uncover Bobby's infection and order the group away. Brian subsequently forces Bobby to leave the group.

As the group runs low on fuel, Brian kills two women to take the gas from their vehicle, but suffers a gunshot wound. While treating his brother's injury, Danny discovers that Brian is infected. Danny attempts to leave Brian behind that night, but Brian takes the keys to their vehicle. Refusing to surrender the keys, Brian goads Danny into killing him so he will not die alone from the virus. Danny and Kate arrive at Turtle Beach the next morning, but Danny realizes that without his brother, the place that seemed special to them as children is now desolate.

== Cast ==
- Lou Taylor Pucci as Danny
- Chris Pine as Brian
- Piper Perabo as Bobby
- Emily VanCamp as Kate
- Christopher Meloni as Frank
- Kiernan Shipka as Jodie
- Mark Moses as Doctor

Additionally, Josh Berry, Tim D. Janis, Dale Malley, and Dylan Kenin portray the survivalists. LeAnne Lynch and Jan Cunningham play the women who encounter the group while low on fuel.

== Production ==
Filmed in New Mexico and Texas in late 2006, Carriers was not released by Paramount Vantage until September 2009, following the success of Pine's appearance as James T. Kirk in Star Trek, released earlier in 2009.

== Release ==
Carriers was released on September 4, 2009, in United States cinemas. The DVD followed on December 29, 2009.

== Box office ==
It grossed $908,000 in the United States and $5,802,422 worldwide.

== Reception ==
Carriers received mixed to positive reviews and holds a 62% 'Fresh' rating on Rotten Tomatoes based on 37 reviews. The film was praised for its story, theme and acting performances, with criticism focused towards its ending.

Rob Nelson of Variety wrote, "Put into extremely limited release by Paramount Vantage after spending years in studio lockdown, Carriers has moments of genuinely communicable horror and thus deserves better than a de facto theatrical quarantine." Paul Chambers from CNN Radio said, "A little more realistic than a zombie flick. Some renegade virus could make the world a 'survival of the fittest' ordeal. A very interesting story with some nice reveals". Charles Cassady from Common Sense Media said: "Gloom, not thrills, in sci-fi drama of worldwide plague."

During the COVID-19 pandemic, the film received a positive retrospective analysis from Chris Sawin of Screen Rant.

== Awards and nominations ==
Kiernan Shipka was nominated for 'Best Performance in a Feature Film – Supporting Young Actress' at the Young Artist Awards (2010).
