= Happiness (1998 film) =

1998 American film by Todd Solondz

- Theatrical release poster by Daniel Clowes
- Directed by: Todd Solondz
- Written by: Todd Solondz
- Produced by: Ted Hope; Christine Vachon
- Starring: Jane Adams; Elizabeth Ashley; Dylan Baker; Lara Flynn Boyle; Ben Gazzara; Jared Harris; Philip Seymour Hoffman; Louise Lasser; Jon Lovitz; Camryn Manheim; Rufus Read; Cynthia Stevenson
- Cinematography: Maryse Alberti
- Edited by: Alan Oxman
- Music by: Robbie Kondor
- Production company: Killer Films
- Distributed by: Good Machine Releasing
- Release date: October 16, 1998
- Running time: 139 minutes
- Country: United States
- Languages: English; Russian
- Budget: $2.2 million
- Box office: $5.7 million

Happiness is a 1998 American black comedy-drama film written and directed by Todd Solondz. It stars an ensemble cast consisting of Jane Adams, Elizabeth Ashley, Dylan Baker, Lara Flynn Boyle, Ben Gazzara, Jared Harris, Philip Seymour Hoffman, Louise Lasser, Jon Lovitz, Camryn Manheim, Rufus Read, and Cynthia Stevenson. The film revolves around the lives of three sisters (Adams, Boyle, and Stevenson), their parents (Gazzara and Lasser), their lovers (Baker, Harris, and Lovitz), and others around them (Ashley, Hoffman, Manheim, and Read). The film was awarded the FIPRESCI Prize at the 1998 Cannes Film Festival for "its bold tracking of controversial contemporary themes, richly-layered subtext, and remarkable fluidity of visual style," and the cast received the National Board of Review award for Best Ensemble Cast.

The film spawned the pseudosequel Life During Wartime, which premiered at the 2009 Venice Film Festival.

== Plot ==
The film follows multiple loosely related narratives, each pertaining to the three Jordan sisters and those within their sphere of influence.

Trish Maplewood, the eldest Jordan sister, is a housewife who lives an upper middle class life. She is married to psychiatrist Bill Maplewood and has three children. Trish is unaware of Bill's secret life as a pedophile who is obsessed with 11-year-old Johnny Grasso, a classmate of their son, Billy. When Johnny comes to the Jordan house for a sleepover, Bill drugs and rapes him. Later, Bill learns that another boy, Ronald Farber, is home alone while his parents are away in Europe. Under the guise of attending a PTA meeting, Bill drives to the boy's house and rapes him as well. After Johnny is taken to the hospital and found to have been sexually abused, the police arrive at the Maplewood residence to question Bill and his wife. Bill mistakenly asks the officers if this is about Ronald Farber, even though the police only mentioned Johnny's name when they arrived, inadvertently implicating himself in an as-yet unknown crime. The next morning the family awakens to the words "serial rapist" and "pervert" spray painted on their house. After school, Billy questions his dad about the things being said at school, and Bill admits that he raped the boys, that he enjoyed it, and that he would do it again. When Billy asks if he would ever rape him, his father tearfully replies, "No. I'd jerk off instead." Trish packs her family into the car the next morning, leaving for her parents' condo in Florida.

Helen Jordan, the middle sister, is a successful author who is adored and envied by everyone she knows. However, her charmed life leaves her ultimately unfulfilled, she despairs that no one wants her for herself, and that the praise regularly heaped upon her is undeserved. She is fascinated by an unknown man who makes obscene phone calls to her apartment and tries to seek out a relationship with him. The man, her neighbor Allen, routinely makes obscene phone calls threatening to sexually assault women for his own gratification, but proves unable to actually touch Helen when given the opportunity to make good on his promises. Allen, who is coincidentally one of Bill's patients, begins a friendship with Kristina, who lives in the same apartment block down the hall. While on a date, Kristina tells him that she killed the apartment doorman after he raped her.

The youngest sister, Joy, is overly sensitive and lacking direction, having been repeatedly criticized by her overbearing sisters. She tearfully breaks up with her boyfriend and coworker, Andy, who reveals and keeps a custom gift he had made for her, calling her shallow. A few days later, he kills himself, and Joy quits her telephone sales job and leaves to do something more fulfilling. She gets hired as a scab worker, teaching at an immigrant-education center. Her students do not like her, and she begins to feel empty in that job as well. Helen tries to set her up with other men. Expecting to hear from a suitor, she instead gets an obscene call from Allen. Later, one of her Russian students, Vlad, offers her a ride in his taxi, and they end up having sex. She is initially smitten, but she soon realizes Vlad was using her and that he may be married. After being attacked by someone she thinks is his wife at the school, she goes to his apartment to make amends. There she discovers the woman is not his wife after all, even though they live together. In Vlad's apartment, Joy sees her missing guitar and CD player. Vlad coerces her into lending him $500 in exchange for her stolen belongings, and Joy quits her job.

Finally, the sisters' parents, Mona and Lenny, are separating after 40 years of marriage, but will not get divorced. Lenny is bored with his marriage, but does not want to start another relationship; he simply "wants to be alone." As Mona copes with being single during her twilight years, Lenny tries to rekindle his enthusiasm for life by having an affair with a neighbor. It is no use, however, as Lenny eventually finds that he has become incapable of feeling.

In the final scene, the Jordan family is united in Mona and Lenny's condo. Helen resolves to set Joy up with Allen, and is finally inspired to write a new piece after hearing about Kristina's killing of the doorman. Trish does not acknowledge Bill's actions, still acting as if everything is normal. Mona and Lenny trade barbs from across the table. Billy achieves an orgasm and ejaculation for the first time masturbating on the balcony while looking at a woman sunbathing. Due to his father's grooming, he proudly declares this to his family.

== Cast ==
- Jane Adams as Joy Jordan
- Dylan Baker as Bill Maplewood
- Lara Flynn Boyle as Helen Jordan
- Ben Gazzara as Lenny Jordan
- Jared Harris as Vlad
- Philip Seymour Hoffman as Allen Mellencamp
- Louise Lasser as Mona Jordan
- Elizabeth Ashley as Diane Freed
- Jon Lovitz as Andrew "Andy" Kornbluth
- Camryn Manheim as Kristina
- Rufus Read as Billy Maplewood
- Cynthia Stevenson as Trish Jordan Maplewood
- Justin Elven as Timmy Maplewood
- Lila Glantzman-Leib as Chloe Maplewood
- Gerry Becker as psychiatrist
- Arthur J. Nascarella as Detective Berman
- Molly Shannon as Nancy
- Marla Maples as Ann Chambeau
- Ann Harada as Kay
- Douglas McGrath as Tom
- Anne Bobby as Rhonda
- Evan Silverberg as Johnny Grasso

== Release ==
=== Controversy ===
The film was highly controversial for its heavy subject matter, particularly its portrayal of pedophilia. The Sundance Film Festival refused to screen the film, alleging it to be too disagreeable. October Films was the initial distributor for the film, and helped finance it. However, October Films' corporate parent Seagram specifically objected to the pedophilia plot line and dropped the film from distribution; Lynn Hirschberg of The New York Times Magazine reported that Ronald Meyer, then the CEO of Universal Pictures, personally blocked October Films from releasing the film, with Solondz later stating that Meyer considered the film "morally objectionable". Good Machine ended up releasing and distributing the movie on their own. Ironically, Universal ended up owning the rights again, after they bought Good Machine in 2003.

=== Rating ===
Due to its explicit subject matter, Happiness received an NC-17 rating from the MPAA, which caused the film to be limited in distribution; the film also had difficulty in advertising. For that reason, Happiness surrendered its NC-17 rating and was instead released unrated.

== Reception ==
=== Critical reception ===
Upon release, popular film critic Roger Ebert gave the film four out of four stars, and rated it number five in his top 10 films of 1998. In his review, he wrote: "...the depraved are only seeking what we all seek, but with a lack of ordinary moral vision... In a film that looks into the abyss of human despair, there is the horrifying suggestion that these characters may not be grotesque exceptions, but may in fact be part of the mainstream of humanity.... It is not a film for most people. It is certainly for adults only. But it shows Todd Solondz as a filmmaker who deserves attention, who hears the unhappiness in the air and seeks its sources."

In a letter written to playwright Robert Patrick, Quentin Crisp stated, "[Happiness] mistook pleasure for happiness and was quite absurd". In his review in Time Out New York, Andrew Johnston observed, "As repulsive as some of the characters are, Solondz makes most of them deeply sympathetic. And every scene works on several levels at once: The film's most hilarious moments all have poignant undercurrents, while the saddest--and most disturbing--are frequently sidesplitting at the same time."

On review aggregator website Rotten Tomatoes, the film holds an 84% approval rating based on 51 critic reviews, with an average rating of 7.9/10. The site's critical consensus states, "Happiness is far from a cheerful viewing experience, but its grimly humorous script and fearless performances produce a perversely moving search for humanity within everyday depravity." On Metacritic, the film holds a rating of 81 out of 100 based on 30 reviews, indicating "universal acclaim".

=== Awards ===
- 1998 Cannes Film Festival – FIPRESCI Prize, Parallel Sections
- 1999 Golden Globes – Nominated for Best Screenplay (Todd Solondz)
- 1998 National Board of Review, USA – Best Acting by an Ensemble
- 1999 Independent Spirit Awards – Nominated for Best Director (Todd Solondz), Best Male Lead (Dylan Baker), Best Supporting Male (Philip Seymour Hoffman)
- 1998 São Paulo International Film Festival – International Jury Award
- 1998 Fort Lauderdale International Film Festival – Critic's Choice Award: Best Actor – Dylan Baker; Best Film
- 1998 Toronto International Film Festival – Metro Media Award
- 1999 British Independent Film Award – Best Foreign Film, English Language
- 1999 Fantasporto – Directors' Week Award – Todd Solondz

== Home media ==
Happiness was released on VHS and DVD after its theatrical release. It remains unavailable to view on any streaming service or for digital purchase.

The film was released on Blu-ray and Ultra HD Blu-ray by The Criterion Collection on September 24, 2024.

== Music ==
Robbie Kondor wrote the film's score.

Eytan Mirsky wrote the title track "Happiness". Actress Jane Adams sings it in a scene in the film; Michael Stipe and Rain Phoenix sing it over the credits.

The following music is played in the film:

- "Soave sia il vento" from Così fan tutte (Wolfgang Amadeus Mozart)
- "Concerto for Guitar in D Major" (Antonio Vivaldi)
- "Happiness" (Eytan Mirsky) – Jane Adams
- "Requiem" (Wolfgang Amadeus Mozart)
- Piano Concerto (Samuel Barber), movements I and II
- "Mandy" (Richard Kerr and Scott English) – Barry Manilow
- "You Light Up My Life" (Joe Brooks) – Mantovani and Anatoly Aleshin
- "All Out of Love" (Graham Russell and Clive Davis) – Air Supply
- "Eternal Lighthouse", composed and performed by Vladimir Mozenkov, Lyrics by Yevgeny Davidov
- "Happiness" (Eytan Mirsky) – Michael Stipe with Rain Phoenix

== See also ==
- List of cult films
