= Went to Coney Island on a Mission from God... Be Back by Five =

- Movie Poster
- Directed by: Richard Schenkman
- Written by: Jon Cryer; Richard Schenkman
- Produced by: Jon Cryer; Richard Schenkman
- Starring: Jon Cryer; Ione Skye; Rick Stear
- Cinematography: Adam Beckman
- Edited by: Richard LaBrie
- Music by: Midge Ure
- Production company: Evenmore Entertainment
- Release date: April 18, 1998 (US)
- Running time: 94 minutes
- Country: United States
- Language: English
- Box office: $14,090 (US)

Went to Coney Island on a Mission from God... Be Back by Five is a 1998 American buddy road drama film directed by Richard Schenkman and written by Schenkman and Jon Cryer. It premiered at the Los Angeles Film Festival.

== Plot ==
Daniel (Jon Cryer) and Stan (Rick Stear) search for a childhood friend of theirs – Richie (Rafael Báez), who they believe may be homeless and mentally ill. The film intercuts with flashbacks from their youth to their 30s, creating a narrative of reflection on the three friends' life paths and how it can lead to failure and ruin.

Having been told Richie was seen on the Coney Island boardwalk, the two leave their workplaces, a jewelry pawn shop and pizzeria respectively, to go look for him. On the train, they discuss their relationships. In particular, Stan's long term girlfriend, Gabby (Ione Skye), and her frustrations with his borderline alcoholism and lack of commitment. In a flashback, a teenage Daniel learns that the supposed womanizer, Richie, was often unable to sexually perform with girls – information which later lead to their falling out.

The young men spend the day exploring Coney Island, which is stranded in the off-season. They begin their search in a Skee-Ball arcade, where they encounter an up-tight employee (Frank Whaley) who refuses to redeem a prize for a ticket short. After Stan storms out, the two men walk by the Cyclone, where they meet a boardwalk photographer named Mickey (Dominic Chianese), who informs them a lot of homeless residents live under the boardwalk. Stopping for a hotdog, Daniel and Stan speak to a distraught man who has been broken up with by his romantic partner, another man named Julie.

Following the distraught man's advice for finding their friend, they check the alley behind the restaurant, where they find Richie scavenging through the garbage. He seems distant, forgetful, and turns down their help. When he confesses the guilt he associates with his sister's death and the fact he's been off his prescribed medication for three years, they convince him to check into a psychiatric institution.

With the revelation that very little separates him from befalling Richie's fate, Stan sets out to improve himself. Daniel's narration throughout the film joins his speech, as best man, at Stan and Gabby's wedding. At the reception, Richie's mother reveals to Daniel that Richie has left professional care and has disappeared once again.

== Principal cast ==
Actor	Role
Jon Cryer	Daniel
Rick Stear	Stan
Rafael Báez	Richie
Ione Skye	Gabby
Frank Whaley	Skee-Ball Weasel
Aesha Waks	Cindy Goldclang
Dominic Chianese	Mickey
Norbert Leo Butz	Pawnbroker

== Production ==
The title has its origin in a note that Cryer left for his girlfriend after going to look for a former classmate who he heard had become homeless and was living in Coney Island.

== Reception ==
Rotten Tomatoes reports that 43% of seven surveyed critics gave the film a positive review; the average rating is 5.4/10. A. O. Scott of The New York Times gave it a mixed review and wrote,"Went to Coney Island never quite comes to dramatic or comic life." Emanuel Levy of Variety wrote that Cryer, Baez, and Stear "give proficient performances that serve the material well, though they can't elevate it to the poignancy and depth intended by the director". Kevin Thomas of the Los Angeles Times called it a "deeply felt, engaging little film" that will stick with audiences after it ends.

It won the audience award at the Austin Film Festival.
