= Storytelling (film) =

2001 film by Todd Solondz

- Theatrical release poster
- Directed by: Todd Solondz
- Written by: Todd Solondz
- Produced by: Ted Hope; Christine Vachon
- Starring: Selma Blair; Robert Wisdom; Paul Giamatti; John Goodman; Lupe Ontiveros; Jonathan Osser; Mark Webber
- Cinematography: Frederick Elmes
- Edited by: Alan Oxman
- Music by: Belle & Sebastian; Nathan Larson
- Production companies: Good Machine; Killer Films; New Line Cinema
- Distributed by: Fine Line Features
- Release dates: May 12, 2001 (Cannes); January 25, 2002 (United States)
- Running time: 87 minutes
- Country: United States
- Languages: English; Spanish
- Box office: $1.3 million

Storytelling is a 2001 American comedy-drama film written and directed by Todd Solondz. It stars Selma Blair, Leo Fitzpatrick, Paul Giamatti, Mark Webber, Robert Wisdom, Xander Berkeley, Aleksa Palladino, Julie Hagerty, Lupe Ontiveros, Franka Potente, and John Goodman. It features original music by Belle & Sebastian, later compiled on the album Storytelling. It was screened in the Un Certain Regard section at the 2001 Cannes Film Festival.

== Plot ==
The film consists of two stories that are unrelated and have different actors, titled "Fiction" and "Non-Fiction". College and high school serve as the backdrop for these two stories about dysfunction and personal turmoil.

Fiction

Vi is a graduate student dating an undergrad, Marcus, who has cerebral palsy, though he observes that she no longer seems passionate about their relationship. They are in a creative writing class taught by a well known black author, Mr. Scott. Marcus has written an amateurish story about the effect of Vi's love on his medical condition, and she encourages him to share it in the class's workshop. While other students give it tepid praise, Mr. Scott and his favorite student, Catherine, harshly dismiss it as mediocre trash. Upset, Marcus angrily blames Vi for not warning him against sharing the story, and breaks up with her, accusing her of being secretly attracted to Mr. Scott. A hurt and heartbroken Vi goes out to a bar and encounters Mr. Scott. She thanks him for being honest about Marcus's story, praises his writing, and asks if he thinks she has potential as a writer; he tells her that he does not. After she flirts with him clumsily, they return to his residence, where she discovers photos of Catherine and other students naked and in various poses. Mr. Scott and Vi have rough sex. Afterwards, Vi returns to Marcus in tears and reconciles with him. Later, back in the class workshop, Vi shares a fictionalized version of her encounter with Mr. Scott. The other students are appalled by the story's content, and Catherine calmly eviscerates the piece, claiming that "Vi" is an arrogant, narcissistic fetishist and racist. When Marcus and Vi defend the piece as being a real experience, an unimpressed Mr. Scott informs them that when she starts writing about an experience, it becomes fiction, and that the story is nevertheless an improvement over her other works because there "is now at least a beginning, a middle, and an end."

Non-Fiction

Toby Oxman is a struggling would-be filmmaker attempting to make his first documentary. Though he originally intends to make a film about the experiences of teenagers post-Columbine on a wide scale, he is eventually forced to limit his scope to one dysfunctional, upper-middle-class suburban New Jersey family and their teenage son Scooby. His father, the strict and unsympathetic Marty, is frustrated with Scooby's lazy attitude and unwillingness to attend college, while his football player brother Brady worries that Scooby is secretly gay and his obnoxious youngest brother Mikey is obliviously self-obsessed. Scooby's only vague ambition is to be famous, and have a talk show on television like his idol Conan O'Brien, who appears to him in a dream sequence as Scooby allows a love-struck friend to perform oral sex on him. Scooby intentionally flunks his exams, but to his surprise, he finds that he has been accepted to Princeton University, which Marty privately reveals was because of a large donation from a family member.

Meanwhile, Mikey torments the family's overworked, underpaid, and exhausted housekeeper, Consuelo, exercising his privileged and sheltered upbringing to badger her with questions that emphasize the discrepancy between their lifestyles. She reveals that she is still poor, has no time for any personal activities due to the constant demands from the family, and that her beloved grandson has been executed after being convicted for rape and murder. The self-centered Mikey only continues ordering her around. Later, Brady suffers a serious accident during football practice and falls into a deep coma. Mikey takes advantage of Marty's vulnerability over Brady's condition to perform hypnotism on him, during which he commands himself to be Marty's new favorite son and orders Marty to fire Consuelo for petty reasons. Miraculously, the hypnosis works perfectly. Marty fires Consuelo despite her tearful pleading, much to Mikey's smug enjoyment.

After the documentary is finished and Toby refuses to let him see the completed footage, Scooby secretly attends a late-night screening, where he witnesses the audience laughing uproariously at his dim-witted portrayal. Realizing that he will never be famous, Scooby is left devastated. While he is away, a vengeful Consuelo sneaks back into the house and murders the rest of the Livingstons by poisoning the house with carbon monoxide. Scooby returns home the next morning to find emergency services wheeling his deceased family into an ambulance. Toby, back with a camera crew, runs up to Scooby to tearfully apologize for what's transpired, but an emotionless and jaded Scooby coldly tells him to not be sorry, because "the movie's a hit."

== Production ==
Solondz intended the film to feature a third segment, entitled "Autobiography". This story focused on a closeted football player, played by James Van Der Beek, and included an explicit gay sex scene. The entire segment was removed, since Solondz was apparently unhappy with how it would fit into the finished film. It was rumored that this decision may have been made under studio pressure due to the graphic homosexual content.

According to Selma Blair, the cast was unaware of how severely the film would be cut. These cuts included reducing her own part, and omitting performances from several other actors in the final edit, including Van Der Beek, Emmanuelle Chriqui, Adam Hann-Byrd and Heather Matarazzo.

== Cast ==
Fiction

- Selma Blair as Vi
- Leo Fitzpatrick as Marcus
- Robert Wisdom as Mr. Scott
- Maria Thayer as Amy
- Angela Goethals as Elli
- Devorah Rose as Lucy
- Nancy Anne Ridder as Joyce
- Steven Rosen as Ethan
- Aleksa Palladino as Catherine
- Mary Lynn Rajskub as Melinda
- Tina Holmes as Sue

Non-fiction

- Paul Giamatti as Toby Oxman
- Mike Schank as Mike the cameraman
- Xander Berkeley as Mr. DeMarco
- Mark Webber as Scooby Livingston
- John Goodman as Marty Livingston
- Julie Hagerty as Fern Livingston
- Noah Fleiss as Brady Livingston
- Jonathan Osser as Mikey Livingston
- Lupe Ontiveros as Consuelo
- Steve Railsback as Mr. Kirk
- Franka Potente as Toby's editor
- Conan O'Brien as himself

== Release ==
Storytelling premiered at the 2001 Cannes Film Festival on May 12, 2001, before receiving a limited North American theatrical release on January 25, 2002.

=== Red box controversy ===
During the sex scene in the Fiction entry, a "red box" was added for the American version of the film, blocking the audience's view of a rough sex scene between Blair and Wisdom. This was used to bend the rules of the MPAA's rating system, allowing the film to obtain the R rating instead of NC-17. The box is not present in the international version of the film, although in the American DVD release, both options are available.

=== Box office ===
The film earned $73,688 in its opening weekend in a mere four venues, ranking number 42 in the domestic box office. By the end of its run, on March 28, 2002, the film grossed $921,445 domestically and $397,500 overseas for a worldwide total of $1,318,945.

=== Critical reception ===
The film received mixed reviews from critics. Review aggregator website Rotten Tomatoes reports a 54% approval rating based on 91 reviews, with an average rating of 5.6/10. The site's critics consensus reads: "Todd Solondz's Storytelling boasts an audacious narrative structure, but fails to deliver on the mechanics of its namesake, yielding a creative exercise that is more interested in satisfying the author's interests rather than the audience's involvement." On Metacritic, the film has a 50 out of 100 rating based on 31 critics, indicating "mixed or average reviews".

== Home media ==
Storytelling was released on DVD after its theatrical release, and on Blu-ray by Shout! Factory on July 9, 2024.

== In popular culture ==
The censored cover for the 2003 Xiu Xiu album A Promise features a red rectangle obscuring the penis featured in the uncensored version. This red rectangle is a reference to the similarly censored sex scene in the "Fiction" portion of Storytelling.
