= Invisible Nation =

2023 American-Taiwanese documentary film

- Theatrical release poster
- Directed by: Vanessa Hope
- Produced by: Vanessa Hope; Ted Hope; Sylvia Feng; Cassandra Jabola; Ivan Orlic
- Cinematography: Laura Hudock
- Edited by: Ku A-Ming; Dave Henry; Justice Yong; Siuloku O
- Music by: Wei-San Hsu
- Production companies: Double Hope Films; Seine Pictures; 100 Chapters
- Distributed by: Abramorama
- Release dates: September 29, 2023 (Woodstock); May 31, 2024 (United States)
- Running time: 85 minutes
- Countries: United States; Taiwan
- Languages: English; Mandarian

Invisible Nation is a 2023 American–Taiwanese documentary film, directed and produced by Vanessa Hope. It follows the presidency of Tsai Ing-wen, as she struggles to preserve Taiwan's democracy and handle the geopolitical forces of the United States and China.

It had its world premiere at the Woodstock Film Festival on September 29, 2023, and is scheduled to be released in the United States on May 31, 2024, by Abramorama.

== Premise ==
The film explores the presidency of Tsai Ing-wen, Taiwan’s first female president. It provides behind-the-scenes access to her eight-year tenure, chronicling Tsai’s efforts to safeguard Taiwan's democratic institutions and national identity in the face of authoritarian threats and escalating tensions with the People's Republic of China. It follows critical moments of her administration, capturing her responses to military intimidation, diplomatic isolation, and political interference from Beijing.

Through interviews, archival footage and animated map-based graphics, the documentary delves into Taiwan’s history of colonization, transition from martial law to democracy and its current struggle for international recognition. The documentary also offers a close look at Tsai, with scenes from the presidential office offering a more intimate view of the inner workings of her administration.

== Production ==
Following the completion of All Eyes and Ears, which followed the relationship between the United States and China, Vanessa Hope wanted to make a documentary revolving around Taiwan and was moved to do so after the landmark 2016 Taiwanese presidential election, remarking, "The Taiwanese people deeply inspired me."

Hope and Geralyn Dreyfous, secured initial funding through the Compton Foundation. Vanessa Hope gained access to Tsai Ing-Wen by filling out a proposal through the presidential office, which took six months for a response. Once they responded, Hope pitched the film, with Ing-Wen agreeing to film, and Hope maintaining editorial control of the project.

Principal photography began initially in May 2017, with another round of filming following the 2019-2020 Hong Kong protests, with Hope living in Taiwan from July 2022 to February 2023, completing post-production on the film.

== Release ==
The film had its world premiere at the Woodstock Film Festival on September 29, 2023. It also screened at the International Documentary Film Festival Amsterdam on November 14, 2023, Slamdance Film Festival on January 25, 2024, and CPH:DOX on March 13, 2024. In April 2024, Abramorama acquired distribution rights to the film, and set it for a May 31, 2024, release.
