= Human Nature (2001 film) =

2001 film by Michel Gondry

- Theatrical release poster
- Directed by: Michel Gondry
- Written by: Charlie Kaufman
- Produced by: Anthony Bregman; Ted Hope; Spike Jonze; Charlie Kaufman
- Starring: Tim Robbins; Patricia Arquette; Rhys Ifans; Miranda Otto; Rosie Perez
- Cinematography: Tim Maurice-Jones
- Edited by: Russell Icke
- Music by: Graeme Revell
- Production companies: StudioCanal; Good Machine
- Distributed by: Fine Line Features; (United States); BAC Films (France)
- Release dates: May 18, 2001 (Cannes); September 12, 2001 (France); April 12, 2002 (United States)
- Running time: 96 minutes
- Countries: United States; France
- Language: English
- Budget: $8.6 million
- Box office: $1.6 million

Human Nature is a 2001 comedy drama film written by Charlie Kaufman and directed by Michel Gondry in his directorial debut. The film stars Tim Robbins, Patricia Arquette, Rhys Ifans, Miranda Otto, and Rosie Perez. It tells the story of three people—a writer with hypertrichosis, a man who was raised as a chimpanzee away from civilization, and a psychologist who attempts to socialize the chimpanzee-man into a civilized member of society and tame his more bestial instincts. It was a box-office bomb and received negative to mixed reviews.

It was screened out of competition at the 54th Cannes International Film Festival.

== Plot ==
Three characters are recounting events from their intertwined lives; Puff, a man who was raised as a chimpanzee in the wilderness, makes a testimony in front of Congress; writer Lila Jute is giving a statement to the police after her arrest; deceased psychologist Nathan Bronfman addresses an unseen audience in the afterlife. Their stories are told in flash-back.

Lila is a woman with a rare hormonal imbalance which causes thick hair to grow all over her body. During her 20s after a brief freak show gig, Lila decides to leave society and live within nature where she feels free to exist comfortably in her natural state. She writes a successful book about her naked, savage, happy, and free life in the woods embracing nature. Then at age thirty, strong sexual desire causes her to return to civilization and have her hair removed in order to find a partner.

The partner she finds is Dr. Nathan Bronfman, a psychologist researching the possibility of teaching table manners to mice. Lila and Nathan go hiking in the woods one day. Lila sights a naked man acting like an ape in the woods who has lived as a wild animal his entire life. Lila discards her clothes and chases him until he's cornered on a tree branch. The man falls off the branch, knocked unconscious. Brought to Nathan's lab, the man is named Puff, after Nathan's French research assistant Gabrielle's childhood dog; a phone call to an unknown person reveals that Gabrielle is actually an American with a fake French accent. First with the help of Gabrielle and later with Lila's help, Nathan performs conditioned reinforcement training on Puff, inculcating him with a veneer of fine manners and high culture, in spite of which Puff still has difficulty controlling sexual urges.

To demonstrate his success, Nathan takes Puff on tour. Puff secretly drinks heavily and patronizes prostitutes. Meanwhile, Nathan and Lila's relationship deteriorates and he is seduced into an affair by a scheming Gabrielle. Eventually Lila decides to take Puff back into the forest to undo his manners training and return him to his natural state.

Lila and Puff live naked in the woods together until found by a threatening Nathan, who is killed by Puff. Lila turns herself in as the murderer and asks Puff to testify on the waywardness of humanity before he returns to his home in the forest after a brief encounter with his biological mother.

After the reporters and spectators leave, Puff comes back out of the forest and gets into a car with Gabrielle (still with a French accent). They drive off to the city to eat, while Puff looks back thoughtfully at the forest. The ending strongly suggests some unexplained collusion between the two, throwing much of the interpretation of what went on before into question.

At the end of the film, there are two philosophical passages read while the credits appear. The first is an excerpt of William of Ockham from Opera Theologica in which Ockham explains his theory of intuitive cognition:

Intuitive cognition is such that when some things are cognized, of which one inheres in the other, or one is spatially distant from the other, or exists in some relation to the other, immediately in virtue of that non-propositional cognition of those things, it is known if the thing inheres or does not inhere, if it is spatially distant or not, and the same for other true contingent propositions, unless that cognition is flawed or there is some impediment."

The second is an excerpt of Novum Organum by Francis Bacon in which Bacon discusses inductivism:

In establishing axioms by this kind of induction, we must also examine and try whether the axiom so established be framed the measure of those particulars only for which it is derived or whether it be larger and wider. And if it be larger and wider, we must observe whether, by indicating to us new particulars, it concerns wideness and largeness as by a collateral security, that we may not either stick fast in things already known or loosely grasp at shadows and abstract forms. That we may not either stick fast in things already known, or loosely grasp at shadows and abstract forms and not at things solid and realized in matter."

== Cast ==
- Patricia Arquette as Lila Jute, a writer with hypertrichosis.
  - Hilary Duff as Young Lila Jute
- Tim Robbins as Nathan Bronfman, a psychologist.
  - Chase MacKenzie Bebak as Young Nathan Bronfman
- Rhys Ifans as Puff, a man found in the forest acting like a chimpanzee.
  - Bobby Pyle as Young Puff
- Rosie Perez as Louise, a friend of Lila who specializes in electrology.
- Miranda Otto as Gabrielle, Nathan's assistant who speaks in a French accent.
- Peter Dinklage as Dr. Frank Edelstein, an old friend of Lila
- Mary Kay Place as Mrs. Bronfman
- Robert Forster as Mr. Bronfman
- Toby Huss as Puff's Father, a man who acted like a chimpanzee who carried to his son after they relocated to the woods.
- Ken Magee, Sy Richardson, and David Warshofsky as the police detectives
- Bobby Harwell and Daryl Anderson as the congressmen
- Miguel Sandoval as Wendell, a therapist.
- Nancy Lenehan as Puff's Mother

== Production ==
Steven Soderbergh was first interested in directing Charlie Kaufman's script in late 1996, when Kaufman was still trying to get Being John Malkovich produced. Soderbergh's considerations for casting were for David Hyde Pierce in the role of Nathan Bronfman, Chris Kattan in the role of Puff (likely due to his character Mr. Peepers on Saturday Night Live at the time), and Marisa Tomei in the role of Lila Jute. He was about to go into pre-production when he was offered Out of Sight and after much deliberation he left the project. Paul Giamatti had been cast in the role of Nathan Bronfman before being replaced by Tim Robbins.

== Reception ==
=== Box office ===
Human Nature grossed $705,308 in the United States and Canada, and $869,352 in other territories for a worldwide total of 1.6 million, against a production budget of $8.6 million.

=== Critical response ===
On review aggregator Rotten Tomatoes, the film holds a score of 48% based on 91 reviews, and an average review of 5.8/10. The website's consensus reads, "As quirky as Being John Malkovich but not as funny, Human Nature feels too forced and unengaging." On Metacritic, it has an average score of 56 out of 100 based on 30 critics, indicating "mixed or average" reviews.

Roger Ebert awarded the film three-stars out of four, lauding the film's "screwball charm" and commenting that director Gondry stages the film with a "level of mad whimsy" that feels "just about right".

In a 2009 review as part of his "Year of Flops" series, critic Nathan Rabin argued that the screenplay, as well as the collaboration between Kaufman and Gondry (the first before Eternal Sunshine of the Spotless Mind), had all the ingredients for a sharp social satire. Rabin wrote that like Kaufman’s scripts for films like Eternal Sunshine, Being John Malkovich, and Adaptation, Human Nature "uses a fantastical conceit to explore the fresh hell of existence and our desperate attempts to deny who we are and what we want." However, Rabin stated that Kaufman’s other works

"…are grounded in visceral human emotions and feel gloriously, painfully alive, [whereas] Human Nature feels strangely hermetic. Ifans, Robbins, and Arquette breathe incredible melancholy, pain, and confusion into their characters, but they cannot make them human. That is perhaps the tragedy of Human Nature: Despite its title and abundance of brilliant ideas and clever lines, it feels strangely abstract and theoretical. Rewatching Human Nature eight years on, the film’s bone-deep sadness resonates more strongly than its cerebral comedy of manners. It’s a profoundly flawed and strangely affecting film about what Arquette refers to as the 'waywardness of humankind' and the sublime agony of being human."
