= Flirt (1995 film) =

1995 film by Hal Hartley

- Directed by: Hal Hartley
- Screenplay by: Hal Hartley
- Produced by: Ted Hope
- Starring: Bill Sage; Dwight Ewell; Miho Nikaido
- Cinematography: Michael Spiller
- Edited by: Hal Hartley; Steve Hamilton
- Music by: Hal Hartley; Jeffrey Taylor
- Production company: Good Machine
- Distributed by: Pandora Film (Germany)
- Release date: 1995
- Running time: 83 minutes
- Countries: United States; Germany; Japan

Flirt is a 1995 drama film written and directed by Hal Hartley and produced by Good Machine.

== Introduction ==
The story takes place in New York, Berlin and Tokyo, with each segment using the same dialogue.

In New York, Bill struggles to decide whether he has a future with Emily, while attempting to restrain Walter, the angry husband of a woman he thinks he might be in love with.

In Berlin, Dwight has a similar experience with his lover, while the events that befall Miho in Tokyo take a more dramatic turn.

== Cast ==
- Bill Sage as Bill
- Dwight Ewell as Dwight
- Miho Nikaido as Miho
- Parker Posey as Emily
- Martin Donovan as Walter
- Hal Hartley as Hal
- Hannah Sullivan as Margaret
- Geno Lechner as Greta
- Toshizo Fujiwara as Ozu
- Chikako Hara as Yuki
- Peter Fitz as Doctor
- Elina Löwensohn as Nurse
- Michael Imperioli as Concerned Bar Patron
- Harold Perrineau, Jr. as Man in Restroom #1
- Robert John Burke as Man in Restroom #2
- Liana Pai as Woman at Phone Booth
- Maria Schrader as Girl in Phone Booth
- Lars Rudolph as Construction Worker
- José Zúñiga as Driver
- Holt McCallany as Bartender

== Reception ==
=== Critical reception ===
On the review aggregator website Rotten Tomatoes, the film holds an approval rating of 73% based on 11 reviews. On Metacritic, the film has a weighted average score of 46 out of 100, based on 16 critics, indicating "mixed or average" reviews.

Film critic James Berardinelli rated the film 2.5 out of 4 stars. Roger Ebert of Chicago Sun-Times gave it 2 out of 4 stars, stating that "It is more amusing to talk about than to experience." While he expresses his appreciation of the film's experimentation and its illustration of the mantra that a film is about how it's presented rather than its subject matter, he opines that it is more of an intellectual exercise than an enjoyable watch. Writing for SPIN, Michael Atkinson said that "by the third replay of the same dialogue, you're significantly less enchanted with the material than Hartley apparently is with himself."

Alison Macor of The Austin Chronicle gave the film 3 out of 4 stars, describing it as an "intriguing ride" and as Hartley's most ambitious film. Film critic Emanuel Levy described it as "a semi-academic treatise about the limits of narrativity," and opined that it "offers some minor rewards."
