= The Ex (2006 film) =

- Theatrical release poster
- Directed by: Jesse Peretz
- Written by: David Guion; Michael Handelman
- Produced by: Anthony Bregman; Marc Butan; Anne Carey; Ted Hope
- Starring: Zach Braff; Amanda Peet; Jason Bateman; Charles Grodin; Mia Farrow; Donal Logue; Amy Poehler; Amy Adams; Fred Armisen
- Cinematography: Tom Richmond
- Edited by: Tricia Cooke
- Music by: Edward Shearmur
- Production companies: The Weinstein Company; This is that 2929 Productions
- Distributed by: Metro-Goldwyn-Mayer (through MGM Distribution Co.)
- Release dates: December 15, 2006 (California); May 11, 2007 (United States)
- Running time: 92 minutes
- Country: United States
- Language: English
- Box office: $5.1 million

The Ex is a 2006 American comedy film directed by Jesse Peretz and starring Zach Braff, Amanda Peet and Jason Bateman. The film had a wide release planned for January 19, 2007, and then March 9, 2007. It was originally promoted under the working title Fast Track. It was released on May 11, 2007. Co-stars include Charles Grodin, in his first film appearance since 1994, Donal Logue and Mia Farrow.

The film generally received negative reviews from critics. It had a gross of $5.1 million.

== Plot ==
Living in Manhattan, Tom is a cook who has difficulty keeping a steady job. His wife, Sofia, is an attorney. When their first child is born, they agree that she will be a full-time mom and he will work hard to get promoted.

When Tom gets fired after defending his friend Paco, he takes a job in Ohio working at the ad agency where his father-in-law is the assistant director. Assigned to report to Chip, who is a strict and hard-working paraplegic and Sofia's ex-boyfriend from high school. Chip is still obsessed with her, so he conspires to make Tom's work life miserable. As Tom's frustrations mount, he seems to sway Sofia to his side.

Tom begins to suspect that Chip isn't handicapped at all and goes through his desk. He finds a photo of him playing tennis and rushes to his in-laws' house to see his wife and show her the picture. He finds Chip having dinner with Sofia and her parents and holding his child. Tom tries to prove that Chip isn't actually paralyzed by dragging him up a flight of stairs and then throws him, expecting him to stand up to prevent falling.

Chip doesn't stand up (the photo actually being his late twin brother) and Tom is humiliated in front of his family. Later, he confronts and attacks him, where Chip reveals that he really can walk, but can't fight outside of his chair. Sitting back down, Chip beats him severely, and then to Tom's increasing rage, reveals that he plans to have sex with Sofia again.

When Chip gets a call from an ad agency boss in Barcelona asking him to move to Spain and become the agency's creative director, he asks Sofia to come with him. Tom pleads with her to believe him that Chip has been faking paralysis. When she rejects Chip, he angrily tells his new "boss" he'll only need one ticket - as it's revealed that it's Paco on the other end of the phone call. Chip tells Sofia he "faked his orgasm" before getting out of his chair and storming out. Continuing to mock the couple, Chip is hit by a bus.

Tom and Sofia have moved out of Ohio and her dad is helping him start his own ad business. Now, the couple have switched positions, Tom becoming a stay-at-home dad while Sofia becomes a full-time lawyer again. During the credits Chip is shown in Barcelona in a wheelchair with two broken legs, only now the passive-aggressive routine that worked so well for him when faking paraplegia in Ohio is ignored in Spain. Still insisting he works there, Chip is tossed out of the ad company, and later on Tom's friend sees him on TV in the middle of the running of the bulls.

== Cast ==
- Zach Braff as Tom Reilly
- Amanda Peet as Sofia Kowalski-Reilly
- Jason Bateman as Chip Sanders
- Charles Grodin as Bob Kowalski
- Mia Farrow as Amelia Kowalski
- Lucian Maisel as Wesley
- Amy Poehler as Carol Lane
- Paul Rudd as Leon
- Fred Armisen as Manny
- Donal Logue as Don Wollebin
- Amy Adams as Abby March
- Josh Charles as Forrest Mead
- Marin Hinkle as Karen
- Romany Malco as Hakeem Oliver
- Yul Vazquez as Paco

== Critical response ==
On Rotten Tomatoes, the film holds a 18% approval rating based on 100 reviews with an average rating of 4.34/10. The site's consensus states: "The Ex suffers from inept direction and characters that are either unsympathetic or plain unpleasant to watch." Metacritic, which uses a weighted average, assigned the film a score of 32 out of 100, based on 24 critics, indicating "generally unfavorable" reviews.

Several film critics said the film felt truncated. Film critics also felt that the majority of the cast's talents were wasted. Many film critics also compared the film to a sitcom. Pam Grady of Reel.com said the film "never rises above the level of a TV show grotesquely inflated for the big screen."

Jesse Peretz was criticized for his direction by many critics. Phoebe Flowers of the South Florida Sun-Sentinel said the film was "directed with a breathtaking lack of instinct by Jesse Peretz." A few critics described the film as half-baked. Sean Means of The Salt Lake Tribune said "It's like undercooked lasagna: lots of layers, but the flavors never blend." Bill Muller of The Arizona Republic said the film was Zach Braff's most average movie so far. Steven Rea of The Philadelphia Inquirer said that after The Last Kiss and Garden State, "Braff's shtick...is getting tired." Desson Thomson of The Washington Post said the film "marks an all-time low for actor Zach Braff -- his Gigli, if you will.."

The screenwriters, David Guion and Michael Handelman, virtually disowned the finished film. Handelman said, "I think what we wrote was meant to be a bit less broad than the film that came out. I think a lot of what you see in either of those films is stuff that was not written by us even though we’re the only credited writers on that." Guion added, "That movie was a bit of a cautionary story for screenwriters in terms of that it was a movie that struggled a little bit and didn’t test well initially, and the financers panicked and said, 'We better show a lot of people getting hit in the balls'... It was unfortunate because the director, Jesse Peretz, is great and very talented, but the movie was ultimately taken out of his hands."

Zach Braff and Jason Bateman were praised for their performances by several critics. Roger Moore of the Orlando Sentinel said "Braff and Bateman make this patchwork just funny enough to be worth our trouble." Jason Bateman was praised by several film critics as being the best part of the movie. David Nusair of Reel Film Reviews said "there's little doubt that Bateman deserves the lion's share of praise thanks to his scene-stealing work as Tom's hilariously smug nemesis."

== Box office performance ==
The film opened at #12 at the U.S. box office, earning $1.4 million in 1,009 theaters in its opening weekend. The film went on to gross $3,093,394 in its nine-week theatrical run in the United States. In other territories, the film grossed $2,085,246 making its total worldwide gross $5,178,640.
