= Fine Line Features =

Film production company

- Type: Division
- Industry: Film production
- Founded: 1991; 35 years ago
- Founder: Ira Deutchman
- Defunct: 2005; 21 years ago
- Fate: Folded into Picturehouse
- Successor: Studio: Picturehouse; Warner Bros. Clockwork; Library: Warner Bros. Clockwork (through New Line Cinema) Home Box Office, Inc. (through HBO Films) (with several exceptions)
- Headquarters: 4000 Warner Blvd, Burbank, California, United States
- Area served: Worldwide
- Key people: Ira Deutchman (president)
- Products: Motion pictures
- Parent: New Line Cinema

Fine Line Features was the specialty films division of media production company New Line Cinema. From 1991 to 2005, under founder and president Ira Deutchman, Fine Line acquired, distributed, and marketed independent films. In 2005, New Line teamed up with fellow Time Warner subsidiary HBO to form Picturehouse, a new specialty film label into which Fine Line was folded.

Fine Line Features DVD releases were split between HBO Video and New Line Home Entertainment. When New Line Home Entertainment ceased to exist in 2010, it was folded into Warner Home Video. HBO Home Entertainment also transferred the manufacturing of physical products to Warner Bros. Home Entertainment in 2019, and by 2020 had fully merged into Warner Bros. Home Entertainment.

== Recognition ==
Fine Line released Robert Altman's Hollywood satire The Player (1992) and his Raymond Carver adaptation Short Cuts (1993). For directing these films, Altman would receive back-to-back Academy Award nominations in 1993 and 1994, respectively.

In 1994, Fine Line released Hoop Dreams, which went on to become one of the top-grossing documentaries at that time, making $11.8 million at the global box office. The film's snub in the Academy Awards' documentary category caused controversy.

In 1996, Fine Line acquired the rights to Australian biographical film Shine, beating out Miramax Films, for a reported $2.5 million. It became Fine Line's top grosser, making nearly $36 million at the global box office. The film also earned Fine Line its first Academy Award nomination for Best Picture as well as several other category nominations and a win for lead actor Geoffrey Rush.

In 1997, Fine Line's The Sweet Hereafter received Academy Award nominations for Atom Egoyan in both the writing and directing categories.

In 2000, Lars Von Trier's Dancer in the Dark won top honors at the Cannes Film Festival for both Trier and the film's star, Icelandic singer Bjork.

In 2002, New Line Cinema entered a deal with HBO Films in which Fine Line Features would handle the theatrical distribution of its films. The first two releases were Academy Award nominee American Splendor (2003) and Gus Van Sant's Palme d’Or winner Elephant (2003).

== Selected films released ==
Warner Bros. Clockwork (through New Line Cinema) owns the distribution rights to the Fine Line Features' films unless otherwise mentioned.

=== 1990s ===
Release date	Title	Worldwide box office gross	Notes
March 10, 1991	Shadow of China	$55,166	North American distribution only
May 19, 1991	An Angel at My Table (Note: Owned by Film4, with U.S. distribution rights currently licensed to Janus Films and The Criterion Collection)	$1,055,995	North American distribution only; produced by Film4 Productions
July 26, 1991	Trust (Note: Owned by Paramount Pictures (via Melange Pictures))	$357,400	North American distribution only; produced by Republic Pictures
September 29, 1991	My Own Private Idaho	$6,408,853	distribution only Inducted into the National Film Registry in 2024
October 4, 1991	The Rapture	$1,277,404	North American distribution only
December 6, 1991	Let Him Have It	$88,686	North American distribution only
February 28, 1992	Where Angels Fear to Tread	$1,403,033	U.S. distribution only
March 20, 1992	Edward II (Note: Owned by Film Movement)	$706,430	North American distribution only
March 20, 1992	Proof	$525,205	North American distribution only
March 27, 1992	Roadside Prophets	$147,724	
April 10, 1992	The Player (Note: Co-owned by Avenue Pictures and Rehab Entertainment, with U.S. distribution rights currently licensed to Janus Films and The Criterion Collection)	$21,708,631	
May 2, 1992	Night on Earth (Note: Owned by Locus Solus, Inc., with distribution rights currently licensed to Janus Films and The Criterion Collection)	$2,115,906	North American distribution only; produced by JVC
May 15, 1992	Monster in a Box	$311,245	
July 24, 1992	Afraid of the Dark	$53,932	
August 7, 1992	London Kills Me (Note: Owned by Universal Pictures (via Focus Features))	$170,667	North American distribution only; produced by PolyGram and Working Title Films
August 21, 1992	Light Sleeper (Note: Owned by StudioCanal, with U.S. distribution rights owned by Lionsgate and Rialto Pictures)	$1,055,987	North American distribution only; produced by Carolco Pictures
September 11, 1992	Swoon (Note: Distribution rights currently licensed to Fortissimo Films, with U.S. distribution rights sub-licensed to Strand Releasing)	$340,100	North American distribution only
October 14, 1992	Simple Men	$143,010	
October 30, 1992	Waterland	$1,100,218	North American distribution only; co-production with Film4 Productions
February 3, 1993	To Want to Fly	$78,144	North American distribution only
February 12, 1993	Riff-Raff	$295,444	North American distribution only; produced by Film4 Productions
February 26, 1993	The Last Days of Chez Nous	$831,578	North American distribution only
April 2, 1993	Léolo	$611,703	U.S. distribution only
April 9, 1993	Bodies, Rest & Motion	$764,724	
April 16, 1993	Wide Sargasso Sea	$1,614,784	North American distribution only
July 23, 1993	Amongst Friends	$265,000	North American distribution only
August 20, 1993	The Ballad of Little Jo	$543,091	North American distribution only
September 15, 1993	Household Saints (Note: Distribution rights currently owned by Milestone Films)	$751,233	North American distribution only; produced by Jones Entertainment
October 8, 1993	Short Cuts	$6,113,462	North American distribution only
December 15, 1993	Naked	$1,797,484	North American distribution only; produced by Film4 Productions
February 2, 1994	Fiorile	$204,185	North American distribution only
March 11, 1994	Bitter Moon (Note: Owned by StudioCanal, with U.S. distribution rights currently licensed to Kino Lorber)	$1,862,805	U.S. distribution only; produced by Le Studio Canal+
April 13, 1994	Naked in New York	$1,038,959	North American distribution only
May 13, 1994	Even Cowgirls Get the Blues	$1,708,873	
May 13, 1994	Widows' Peak (Note: Distribution rights currently owned by Foundation Distribution)	$6,243,722	
July 15, 1994	Spanking the Monkey	$1,359,736	
July 29, 1994	Barcelona	$7,266,973	North American distribution only; produced by Castle Rock Entertainment
September 30, 1994	Caro diario	$173,696	North American distribution only
October 14, 1994	Hoop Dreams (Note: Owned by Shout! Studios)	$11,830,611	North American distribution only
November 23, 1994	Mrs. Parker and the Vicious Circle	$2,144,667	North American distribution only
December 23, 1994	Death and the Maiden	$3,103,716	North American distribution only
May 3, 1995	Once Were Warriors	$1,608,610	North American distribution only
May 19, 1995	Little Odessa (Note: Owned by Lionsgate)	$1,095,885	distribution only; produced by LIVE Entertainment
June 16, 1995	The Incredibly True Adventure of Two Girls in Love (Note: U.S. distribution rights currently owned by Strand Releasing)	$2,213,927	North American distribution only
July 21, 1995	An Awfully Big Adventure	$259,724	North American distribution only
July 28, 1995	Double Happiness (Note: U.S. distribution rights currently owned by Samuel Goldwyn Films)	$759,393	U.S. distribution only
November 3, 1995	The Promise	$592,543	North American distribution only
November 3, 1995	Total Eclipse	$340,139	North American distribution only
November 22, 1995	Frankie Starlight	$103,365	North American distribution only
February 9, 1996	Pie in the Sky	—N/a	
March 29, 1996	Carried Away	$290,978	
August 16, 1996	Kansas City (Note: Owned by mk2 Films)	$1,356,828	North American distribution only
September 13, 1996	Feeling Minnesota	$3,124,440	co-production with Jersey Films
October 11, 1996	The Grass Harp	$559,771	
October 25, 1996	Normal Life	$22,891	
October 25, 1996	Twelfth Night	$588,621	North American distribution only
November 1, 1996	Mother Night	$403,701	
November 20, 1996	Shine (Note: U.S. distribution rights currently owned by MPI Media Group)	$35,999,121	North American distribution only
March 21, 1997	Crash	$2,693,288	U.S. distribution only; produced by Alliance Communications, The Movie Network, Telefilm Canada and Recorded Picture Company
March 21, 1997	The Quiet Room	—N/a	North American distribution only
April 11, 1997	Pink Flamingos	$11,170	25th anniversary re-release
May 9, 1997	Nowhere	$198,952	
May 16, 1997	Love! Valour! Compassion!	$2,977,807	
June 18, 1997	For Roseanna	$123,330	North American distribution only
June 25, 1997	Head Above Water	$32,212	co-production with Tig Productions
July 10, 1997	Desperate Living	$1,109	20th anniversary re-release
July 16, 1997	All Over Me	$292,577	
September 5, 1997	Julian Po	$51,942	
October 17, 1997	Gummo	$119,989	with Independent Pictures
November 21, 1997	The Sweet Hereafter	$3,263,585	U.S. distribution only; produced by Alliance Communications
December 24, 1997	The Winter Guest	$870,290	North American distribution only
January 2, 1998	Deconstructing Harry (Note: Owned by WestEnd Films, with U.S. distribution handled by Quiver Distribution)	$10,686,84	North American distribution only; produced by Sweeetland Films and Jean Doumanian Productions
April 17, 1998	Wild Man Blues	$533,759	North American distribution only; produced by Sweetland Films
June 12, 1998	Passion in the Desert	$250,897	North American distribution only
July 10, 1998	When I Close My Eyes	$7,859,654	U.S. distribution only
September 11, 1998	Let's Talk About Sex	$373,615	North American distribution only
September 18, 1998	Esmeralda Comes by Night	$15,671	U.S. distribution only
September 25, 1998	Pecker	$2,281,761	
December 25, 1998	Hurlyburly	$1,808,004	North American distribution only
December 25, 1998	The Legend of 1900	$21,061,339	distribution outside Italy only
January 22, 1999	The Theory of Flight	$73,233	North American distribution only
January 24, 1999	Man of the Century	$34,857	U.S. distribution only
April 9, 1999	Lovers of the Arctic Circle	$357,549	U.S. distribution only
May 21, 1999	Besieged	$2,048,740	North American distribution only; produced by BBC Films
July 23, 1999	Trick	$2,087,228	North American distribution only; produced by Roadside Attractions and Good Machine
October 15, 1999	Julien Donkey-Boy	$92,442	with Independent Pictures
December 10, 1999	Tumbleweeds	$1,350,248	distribution only
December 15, 1999	Simpatico	$1,281,813	North American distribution only

=== 2000s ===
Release date	Title	Worldwide box office gross	Notes
January 28, 2000	The Cup	$1,096,117	North American distribution only
March 24, 2000	Buddy Boy	$12,597	North American distribution only
March 29, 2000	The Filth and the Fury	$612,433	North American distribution only
July 14, 2000	The Five Senses	$515,847	U.S. distribution only; produced by Alliance Atlantis
August 11, 2000	An Affair of Love	$401,299	distribution in the U.S. and English-speaking Canada only
September 1, 2000	Saving Grace	$31,430,066	North American distribution only
October 6, 2000	Dancer in the Dark	$40,061,153	North American distribution only; co-production with Zentropa Entertainments, Canal+ and FilmFour
January 12, 2001	State and Main	$9,206,279	North American distribution only; produced by Filmtown Entertainment, Green/Renzi and El Dorado Pictures
January 26, 2001	Before Night Falls	$8,601,053	North American distribution only
January 26, 2001	Tomorrow	—N/a	North American distribution only
February 2, 2001	The Invisible Circus	$494,630	
June 14, 2001	The Anniversary Party	$4,931,888	
July 20, 2001	Hedwig and the Angry Inch	$3,660,081	with New Line Cinema
September 14, 2001	The Prime Gig	$94,938	North American distribution only
January 25, 2002	Storytelling	$1,318,945	co-production with Good Machine
April 12, 2002	Human Nature	$1,574,660	North American distribution only; produced by StudioCanal and Good Machine
June 7, 2002	Cherish	$179,751	North American distribution only
September 20, 2002	Invincible	$180,616	North American distribution only
February 18, 2003	The Sleeping Dictionary	$57,524	distribution only
September 7, 2003	Ripley's Game	$6,200,970	
September 12, 2003	American Splendor	$7,986,084	North American theatrical distribution only; with HBO Films
October 24, 2003	Elephant	$10,012,022	North American theatrical distribution only; with HBO Films
July 16, 2004	Maria Full of Grace	$12,594,630	North American theatrical distribution only; with HBO Films
September 24, 2004	A Dirty Shame	$1,914,166	distribution only; replaced by New Line Cinema on international prints
October 22, 2004	Vera Drake (Note: Owned by StudioCanal, with distribution rights licensed to Lionsgate)	$13,267,869	North American distribution only
October 29, 2004	Birth	$25,494,085	with New Line Cinema
December 17, 2004	The Sea Inside	$43,731,621	distribution in English-speaking territories only; replaced by New Line Cinema on international prints
April 29, 2005	The Holy Girl	$1,261,792	North American theatrical distribution only; with HBO Films
April 29, 2005	The Year of the Yao	$38,585	distribution only; produced by Endgame Entertainment and NBA Entertainment
June 10, 2005	The Bridge of San Luis Rey	$1,910,546	U.S. distribution only; produced by Metropolitan Films and Davis Films
