= Arresting Gena =

- Hong Kong DVD cover
- Directed by: Hannah Weyer
- Written by: Hannah Weyer
- Produced by: Margot Bridger; Ted Hope
- Starring: Aesha Waks; Summer Phoenix; J. Smith-Cameron; Sam Rockwell
- Cinematography: Elliot Rockett
- Edited by: Meg Reticker
- Music by: Pat Irwin
- Production companies: Fear Productions Inc.; Good Machine
- Release date: January 24, 1997 (Sundance)
- Running time: 90 minutes
- Country: United States
- Language: English

Arresting Gena is a 1997 American crime drama film written and directed by Hannah Weyer and starring Aesha Waks, Summer Phoenix, J. Smith-Cameron, and Sam Rockwell. It premiered in competition at the 1997 Sundance Film Festival.

== Premise ==
During the summer before her senior year of high school, 16-year-old Gena's life is abruptly changed when her mother falls into a coma and is put in the hospital. In the meantime, she goes to live with her Uncle John, whom she does not have much of a relationship with. She meets Jane, a charismatic runaway, and the two become friends. Gena is drawn into Jane's world, which includes Gena's older brother Sonny, who is also a petty criminal. Soon the girls find themselves caught up in Sonny's dealing with a local gang leader, Sugar.

== Cast ==
- Aesha Waks as Gena
- Summer Phoenix as Jane Freeman
- Paul Lazar as Uncle John
- J. Smith-Cameron as Caroline Lee
- Sam Rockwell as Sonny
- Brendan Sexton III as Soldier
- Adrian Grenier as Kabush
- Heather Matarazzo as Pam
- Kirk Acevedo as Caller
- Dan Moran as Sugar
- Vincent Laresca as Bopo
- Selma Blair as drugged woman
- Paul Giamatti as Detective Wilson
- Nick Sandow as Paul
- Merritt Wever as Tammy
- Annie Golden as Sally

== Production ==
Director Hannah Weyer attracted attention in 1995 with her New York University MFA thesis film, The Salesman and Other Adventures, which won the Best Short prize at the Sundance Film Festival in 1995. Following this, she began work on Arresting Gena, with the intention of screening it at Sundance. The script was workshopped at the Sundance Filmmakers' Lab in June 1995.

Actress Aesha Waks was cast in the lead role following a two-month video submission audition process. Filming occurred in New Jersey.

== Release and reception ==
Arresting Gina premiered in competition at the Sundance Film Festival on January 24, 1997. It was expected to perform well there, with Filmmaker commenting it had "a nuanced script [that] explores the obsessive devotion of teenage girls and the societal pressures that pull them apart. Its locale feels genuine and the work seems to come from an honest emotional place." However, it received a mixed reaction at the festival and was not able to secure a distribution deal.

In a Variety review, critic Emanuel Levy described Arresting Gena as a "frustrating, misconceived effort to illuminate the painful coming of age of its protagonist, a sensitive girl unwillingly pushed into a sleazy world of crime." Levy said the film's "most congenial scenes, which enjoy only brief screen time, are those depicting Gena’s romantic and sexual awakening. There are also some achingly touching moments in the interactions between Jane and Sonny, siblings realizing they can neither help nor rely on each other," but said, "lacking a third act, [the film] has an abrupt, unsatisfying denouement", and that "Gena's character remains an enigma."

In contrast, Lisa Alspector of the Chicago Reader wrote, "Writer-director Hannah Weyer keeps control of the extreme scenes...by being convincing with the quieter ones, and we get to know Gena well enough to accept the shifts in tone when she and Jane tangle with an undercover police officer or when she confronts Sonny after Jane disappears." Alspector concluded, "Weyer's portrait makes believable and comprehensible some apparently self-destructive things this teenager does in pursuit of thrills and emotional connections.
