= Ride with the Devil (film) =

1999 American film

- Theatrical release poster
- Directed by: Ang Lee
- Screenplay by: James Schamus
- Based on: Woe to Live On by Daniel Woodrell
- Produced by: Ted Hope; Robert F. Colesberry; James Schamus
- Starring: Tobey Maguire; Skeet Ulrich; Jewel; Jeffrey Wright; Simon Baker; Jonathan Rhys Meyers; James Caviezel; Thomas Guiry; Jonathan Brandis
- Cinematography: Frederick Elmes
- Edited by: Tim Squyres
- Music by: Mychael Danna
- Production company: Good Machine
- Distributed by: USA Films
- Release dates: September 9, 1999 (Deauville Film Festival); November 26, 1999 (U.S.)
- Running time: 138 minutes
- Country: United States
- Language: English
- Budget: $38 million
- Box office: $635,096

Ride with the Devil is a 1999 American revisionist Western film directed by Ang Lee and starring Tobey Maguire, Skeet Ulrich, Jeffrey Wright, Jewel in her feature film debut, Simon Baker, Jonathan Rhys Meyers, James Caviezel, Thomas Guiry and Jonathan Brandis. Based on the novel Woe to Live On, by Daniel Woodrell, the film, set during the American Civil War, follows a group of men who join the First Missouri Irregulars, also known as the Bushwhackers—guerrilla units loyal to pro-Confederacy units of the state—and their war against Northern Jayhawkers allied with the Union army.

The film was a co-production between Universal Studios (the successor to Polygram Filmed Entertainment) and Good Machine. Principal photography began on March 25, 1998. Theatrically, it was commercially distributed by the USA Films division of USA Networks and premiered in only six theaters nationwide in the United States on November 26, 1999, and for only three days, grossing a total of $635,096 (~$1.15 million in 2025).

Ride with the Devil has been noted for its thematic exploration of politics, violence and war. In 2010, The Criterion Collection released a restored high-definition digital transfer for the home media market, featuring an extended 148-minute director's cut of the film.

== Plot ==
Jake Roedel and Jack Bull Chiles are friends in Lexington, Missouri when the Civil War breaks out. Chiles' family are wealthy planters, and Jake's father, a German immigrant, warns him of anti-German suspicion from other Southerners. Jayhawkers set fire to the Chiles' plantation and execute Jack's father, but Jack escapes with Jake.

One year later, they have joined the First Missouri Irregulars under "Black" John Ambrose, an informal unit loyal to the Confederate government of Missouri, alongside George Clyde, former slave Holt, and sadistic Pitt Mackeson, who despises the literate Jake. The Irregulars use guerrilla warfare against the Jayhawkers, supported by pro-Confederate citizens of Missouri. Jake spares captured Unionist Alf Bowden, his former neighbor, but news later arrives that Alf has killed Jake's father as revenge against the Irregulars.

Jake, Jack, Holt, and Clyde are sent to hide over winter, in a dugout on the property of the Evans family. A young widow in the household, Sue Lee Shelley Evans, becomes romantically involved with Jack, while Clyde leaves to romance Juanita Willard nearby. Jake bonds with Holt over captured letters, who reveals that his given name is Daniel and that Clyde, his childhood friend, bought him his freedom. An attack by Jayhawkers leaves the Evans' home burned, patriarch dead and Jack severely wounded. Clyde abandons them (supposedly to find a doctor) to rejoin the Irregulars and Captain Purdees. Jake, Holt, and Sue Lee try to amputate Jack's injured arm, but he dies from complications of gangrene.

Jake and Holt escort Shelley to the Brown homestead (Cave Wyatt's family) before riding to find Clyde and the Irregulars. They learn the Union army has hunted down many of their comrades. The Irregulars join forces with guerrillas led by William Quantrill, who plans to raid Lawrence, Kansas. On August 21, 1863, the pro-South forces easily overcome the small garrison of troops guarding Lawrence, burn and loot shops and homes, and kill Union supporters and black freedmen. Avoiding the bloodshed, Jake and Holt find a nearby restaurant to eat breakfast, where they are threatened by Mackeson and force him to leave at gunpoint.

As the guerrillas make their escape, Ambrose accuses Jake of abandoning the Southern cause by refusing to execute the civilians at the restaurant but he holds from shooting Jake as the Union troops pursue them into the woods. Quantrill and Ambrose organize the men to feign retreat and form battle lines, holding off the pursuit. Mackeson shoots at Jake, and Holt is hit trying to return fire. Clyde rushes to his aid, but is shot through the throat and dies in Holt's arms. Wounded, Jake and Holt flee with their comrade Cave Wyatt and recuperate with the Brown family, while Sue Lee has given birth to Jack's daughter, who she calls Grace Shelley Chiles. Assuming Jake is the father, Cave urges him to marry her.

With Jack and Clyde gone, Jake and Holt reflect on their futures; Jake admits he does not want to rejoin the Irregulars and feels the war is turning against the Confederacy, while Holt confides that although he was not Clyde's slave, he feels "free" now his friend is gone. News arrives that Quantrill has fled to Kentucky and the surviving Irregulars are now outlaws, including Mackeson, who intends to settle the score with Jake. Once his guests are recovered, Mr. Brown brings home a minister and the reluctant Jake is pressed into marrying Sue Lee, but comes to care for her and her child. Striking out for California with his new family, Jake (now 19 years old) cuts his hair, which he had sworn not to do until he was finished with the war.

Along the journey, Jake and Holt encounter Mackeson, who is on the run with another surviving Irregular after the executions of Ambrose and Quantrill. The outlaws are prepared to ride into Mackeson's Union-occupied hometown of Newport, Missouri, even though this means certain death. Mackeson accepts a cup of brewed chicory, but his unhinged manners lead Jake and Holt to draw their guns, and he rides off. Holt eventually parts ways with Jake while Sue Lee and the baby sleep, hoping to free his mother from slavery in Texas, and the two friends shake hands and exchange farewells.

== Cast ==
- Tobey Maguire as Jake Roedel
- Skeet Ulrich as Jack Bull Chiles
- Jewel as Sue Lee Shelley
- Jeffrey Wright as Daniel Holt
- Simon Baker as George Clyde
- Jonathan Rhys Meyers as Pitt Mackeson
- Jim Caviezel as Black John Ambrose
- Tom Guiry as Riley Crawford
- Jonathan Brandis as Cave Wyatt
- Mark Ruffalo as Alf Bowden
- Tom Wilkinson as Orton Brown
- Margo Martindale as Wilma Brown
- John Ales as William Quantrill
- Matthew Faber as Turner Rawls
- Celia Weston as Mrs. Clark
- John Judd as Otto Roedel
- Don Shanks as George
- John Durbin as Skaggs
- Zach Grenier as Mr. Evans
- Stephen Mailer as Babe Hudspeth
- James Urbaniak and David Rees Snell as poker players

== Analysis ==
Film scholar Stephen Teo notes that the film approaches themes of "domesticity, the role of women, homosociality, and violence... with great sensitivity."

Many critics have noted that the film does little to orient or guide its audience through the historical landscape in which it is set, and instead presents events in a manner that is "unremarkable," "undemonstrative," and "somewhat ghostly." Writer Andrew Patrick Nelson considers Ride with the Devil as being part of the revisionist Western tradition, though he concedes that it "has little of the self-consciousness that generally marks the form." Nelson asserts that director Ang Lee often forgoes excessive attention to historical details, and instead attempts to immerse the audience in an experience that "is responsive to the daily realities and rhythms that surround the characters." It is because of this that Nelson claims the film has more in common with "metaphysical" works of filmmakers such as Terrence Malick."

== Production ==
=== Casting and set design ===
The leading actors were required to go through three weeks of boot camp to prepare them for their roles. During shooting, Maguire hesitated under the grueling heat and 16-hour workdays, but pressed on to complete the filming. The actors first trained shooting blank loads, and then live ammunition for action conflict scenes. More than 250 Civil War black-powder pistols were used during the production phase. Over 140 extras played Lawrence residents, and more than 200 Civil War re-enactors were brought in to relay their style of living to the filming sequences.

Principal photography began on March 25, 1998. Filming took place primarily on location in Sibley, Missouri, Kansas City, Kansas, and Kansas City, Missouri. Pattonsburg, Missouri also stood in as a primary filming set locale. The set design production team removed telephone poles and utilized truckloads of dirt to cover existing asphalt and concrete. Production designer Mark Friedberg created numerous indoor and outdoor sets of the time period to ensure and maintain historical accuracy.

=== Music ===
The original motion picture music for Ride with the Devil, was released by the Atlantic Records music label on November 23, 1999. The score for the film was orchestrated by Mychael Danna and Nicholas Dodd. Musical artist Jewel contributed vocals to the score with her song "What's Simple Is True", from her 1998 album Spirit.

Ride with the Devil: Music from and inspired by the Motion Picture

Film score by Mychael Danna
- Released: November 23, 1999
- Length: 53:21
- Label: Atlantic Records

Ride with the Devil: Music from and inspired by the Motion Picture
No.	Title	Length
1.	"Opening Credits"	3:01
2.	"Miss McLeod's Reel"	1:41
3.	"Jayhawkers and Bushwhackers"	3:20
4.	"Clark Farm Shootout"	3:05
5.	"Fireside Letter"	1:50
6.	"Sally in the Garden"	1:21
7.	"Settling in for Winter"	0:49
8.	"Ride to the Evans/Hilltop Letter"	2:10
9.	"Sue Lee/Dinner at the Evans"	1:28
10.	"The Ambush"	2:52
11.	"George Clyde Clears Out"	1:44
12.	"Jack Bull's Death"	4:45
13.	"Old King Crow"	2:06
14.	"Quantrill's Arrival/Ride to Lawrence"	2:37
15.	"Sacking Lawrence"	4:05
16.	"Don't Think You Are a Good Man"	2:11
17.	"Battle and Betrayal"	3:13
18.	"Freedom"	2:42
19.	"A Chicken at the End of It"	1:36
20.	"Finale"	3:09
21.	"What's Simple Is True"	3:36
Total length:		53:21

== Marketing ==
=== Novel ===
The basis for the film, Daniel Woodrell's novel Woe to Live On (originally published in 1987) was released as a movie tie-in edition, re-titled Ride With the Devil, by Pocket Books on November 1, 1999. The book dramatizes the events of the American Civil War during the 1860s, as depicted in the film. It expands on the inner-fighting between rebel Bushwhackers and Union Jayhawkers, with civilians caught in the crossfire. The story relates a coming-of-age experience for Roedel as he emotionally comprehends the losses of his best friend, father and comrades. On a separate front, Roedel expresses love for his best friend's widow, and learns about tolerance from his contact with a reserved black Irregular, Daniel Holt (played by Jeffery Wright).

== Release ==
Ride with the Devil received its world premiere at the 25th Deauville American Film Festival in France on September 9, 1999. The following day it had its North American premiere at the Toronto Film Festival in Canada. The film's UK premiere was at the opening night gala of the London Film Festival on November 3, 1999.

=== Home media ===
Following its cinematic release in theaters, the Region 1 Code widescreen edition of the film was released on DVD in the United States on July 18, 2000. Special features for the DVD include; Jewel music video: "What's Simple Is True", the Theatrical Trailer, Production notes, Cast and filmmakers extra, and a Universal web link.

The Criterion Collection released a restored special edition on DVD and Blu-ray on April 27, 2010. It includes a 148-minute extended cut of the film. Special features include; Two audio commentaries one featuring Lee and producer-screenwriter James Schamus and one featuring Elmes, sound designer Drew Kunin, and production designer Mark Friedberg; a new video interview with star Jeffrey Wright, and a booklet featuring essays by critic Godfrey Cheshire and Edward E. Leslie, author of The Devil Knows How to Ride: The True Story of William Clarke Quantrill and his Confederate Raiders.

The film is also available in video on demand formats, as well.

== Reception and legacy ==
=== Box office ===
Ride with the Devil had an initial screening on November 24, 1999, in New York City, Kansas City, Missouri and Los Angeles. For most of its limited release, the film fluctuated between 11 and 60 theater screening counts. At its most competitive showing, the filmed ranked in 37th place for the December 17–19 weekend in 1999.

The film premiered in cinemas on November 26, 1999, in limited release throughout the United States. During that weekend, the film opened in 50th place grossing $64,159 in business showing at 11 locations. The film Toy Story 2 opened in 1st place during that weekend with $57,388,839 in revenue. The film's revenue dropped by almost 20% in its second week of release, earning $51,600. For that particular weekend, the film fell to 53rd place although with an increased theater count showing at 15 theaters. Toy Story 2 remained unchallenged in 1st place with $18,249,880 (~$25.7 million in 2025) in box office business. During its final week in release, Ride with the Devil opened in 57th place grossing $39,806. For that weekend period, Stuart Little starring Geena Davis opened in 1st place with $11,214,503 in revenue. Ride with the Devil went on to top out domestically at $635,096 (~$1.15 million in 2025) in total ticket sales through a 6-week theatrical run. For 1999 as a whole, the film would cumulatively rank at a box office performance position of 219.

=== Critical response ===
"From a technical perspective, Ride with the Devil is nearly perfect. The attention to detail invested by Lee and his crew shows. From costumes to props, everything has the unmistakable hallmark of authenticity. The only Civil War drama able to boast an equal level of historical accuracy is Gettysburg."

— James Berardinelli, writing in ReelViews

Among mainstream critics in the U.S., the film received generally positive reviews. Rotten Tomatoes reported that 65% of 68 sampled critics gave the film a positive review, with an average score of 6.3 out of 10. The website's consensus reads: "A well-acted, eccentric Civil War film, Ang Lee's Ride With the Devil is often more visually striking than it is emotionally engaging." At Metacritic, which assigns a weighted average out of 100 to critics' reviews, Ride with the Devil received a score of 69 based on 29 reviews. The film failed to garner any award nominations for its acting or production merits from accredited film organizations.

Peter Stack, writing in the San Francisco Chronicle, said in outward positive sentiment, "Lee's approach mixes an unsettling grittiness with an appealing, often luminous elegance (thanks to Frederick Elmes' cinematography) in picturing a patch of America at war with itself." Left impressed, Stephen Hunter in The Washington Post, wrote that the film was "terrific" and that it contained the "most terrifying kind of close-in gunplay, with big, pulsing holes blown into human beings for a variety of reasons ranging from the political to the nonsensical." In a mixed to positive review, Stephen Holden of The New York Times, described the film's production aspects as being of "meditative quality and its attention to detail and the rough-hewn textures of 19th-century life are also what keep the story at a distance and make "Ride with the Devil" dramatically skimpy, even though the movie stirs together themes of love, sex, death and war." Wesley Morris of The San Francisco Examiner, commented that Ride with the Devil was "downright hot-blooded in the nameless violence going on west of marquee Civil War battles. Never has this war been filmed with such ragged glory. The boys grasping their rifles look like trigger-happy rock stars of the prairies, so much so that they threaten to transform the film into a great hair movie." In a slightly upbeat conviction, Andrew O'Hehir of Salon.com asserted that "for all its clumsy dialogue and loose plotting, this is historical filmmaking of a high order, both visually and thematically ambitious." Todd McCarthy of Variety, added to the exuberant tone by declaring, "Impressing once again with the diversity of his choices of subject matter and milieu, director Ang Lee has made a brutal but sensitively observed film about the fringes of the Civil War".

The film was not without its detractors. Writing for the Chicago Sun-Times, Roger Ebert bluntly stated that the motion picture "does not have conventional rewards or payoffs, does not simplify a complex situation, doesn't punch up the action or the romance simply to entertain. But it is, sad to say, not a very entertaining movie; it's a long slog unless you're fascinated by the undercurrents." In a primarily negative review, Lisa Schwarzbaum writing for Entertainment Weekly, called the film "an oddly unengaging one, not because of any weak performances (even crooning poetess Jewel acquits herself pleasantly in her film debut), but because the waxy yellow buildup of earnest tastefulness (the curse of the Burns school of history) seals off every character from our access." Describing a favorable opinion, Russell Smith of The Austin Chronicle professed the film as exhibiting "unostentatious originality, psychological insight, and stark beauty". While following up, he stressed "There's an odd blend of stylization and extreme realism to this film. The dialogue is stilted, full of archaic $20-words and dime-novel flamboyance — all the more jarring when delivered by these teenaged bumpkin characters."

"It's a film that would inspire useful discussion in a history class, but for ordinary moviegoers, it's slow and forbidding."

— Roger Ebert, writing for the Chicago Sun-Times

James Berardinelli of ReelViews proclaimed Ride with the Devil "takes us away from the big battles of the East and to a place where things are less cleanly defined." He also stated that "As was true almost everywhere else, idealogical gulfs often divided families. This is the terrain into which Lee has ventured, and the resulting motion picture offers yet another effective and affecting portrait of the United States' most important and difficult conflict." David Sterritt writing for The Christian Science Monitor reasoned, "The movie is longer and slower than necessary, but it explores interesting questions of wartime violence, personal integrity, and what it means to come of age in a society ripping apart at the seams." Film critic Steve Simels of TV Guide was consumed with the nature of the subject matter exclaiming, "A nicely ambiguous ending and terrific acting by the mostly young cast mostly makes up for the longeurs, however, and for the record, Jewel acquits herself well in a not particularly demanding role."

In 2013, the film was the subject of an essay in a collection of scholarly essays on Ang Lee's films, The Philosophy of Ang Lee.

== Sources ==
- Nelson, Andrew Patrick (2013). Contemporary Westerns: Film and Television since 1990. Lanham, Maryland: Scarecrow Press. ISBN 978-0-810-89257-6.
- Teo, Stephen (2017). Eastern Westerns: Film and Genre Outside and Inside Hollywood. New York: Taylor & Francis. ISBN 978-1-317-59226-6.
