= What Happened Was =

1994 American independent film

What Happened Was...
- Theatrical release poster
- Directed by: Tom Noonan
- Screenplay by: Tom Noonan
- Based on: What Happened Was... by Tom Noonan
- Produced by: Scott Macaulay; Robin O'Hara
- Starring: Karen Sillas; Tom Noonan
- Cinematography: Joe DeSalvo
- Edited by: Richmond Arrley
- Music by: Ludovico Sorret (Noonan's pseudonym)
- Production companies: Good Machine; Genre Pictures
- Distributed by: The Samuel Goldwyn Company
- Release dates: 26 January 1994 (Sundance); 9 September 1994 (New York)
- Running time: 91 minutes
- Country: United States
- Language: English
- Box office: $22,973 (US/Canada)

What Happened Was... is a 1994 American independent film written for the screen, directed by and starring Tom Noonan. It is an adaptation of Noonan's original stage play of the same name.

== Plot ==
The film depicts two people, played by Karen Sillas and Tom Noonan, on a first date; their conversation gradually reveals their lonely lives and hidden personalities.

== Reception ==
On the review aggregator website Rotten Tomatoes, 91% of 22 critics' reviews are positive, with an average rating of 7.5/10. Metacritic, which uses a weighted average, assigned the film a score of 71 out of 100, based on 24 critics, indicating "generally favorable" reviews.

On the Siskel & Ebert show, Gene Siskel gave the film a thumbs up, stating that "For what is really just one long night of conversation, the stakes and the tension couldn't be any higher if these were two characters having a more conventional action scene." Roger Ebert gave the film a thumbs down, calling it "Contrived" and stating that "There is a lot less here than meets the eye." The film is a favorite of filmmaker Charlie Kaufman.

It opened at the Angelika Film Center in Manhattan on September 9, 1994 and grossed $22,973 in its opening week.

=== Year-end lists ===
- 10th – Todd Anthony, Miami New Times
- Top 9 (not ranked) – Dan Webster, The Spokesman-Review
- Top 10 (listed alphabetically, not ranked) – Jimmy Fowler, Dallas Observer
- "The second 10" (not ranked) – Sean P. Means, The Salt Lake Tribune
- Honorable mention – Howie Movshovitz, The Denver Post
- Honorable mention – Jeff Simon, The Buffalo News

== Accolades ==
It won the Grand Jury Prize and the Waldo Salt Screenwriting Award at the 1994 Sundance Film Festival. Noonan was nominated for Best First Screenplay and Karen Sillas for Best Female Lead at the 10th Independent Spirit Awards.

== Planned sequel ==
Noonan wrote a sequel, which he pitched to both Netflix and Amazon Prime, but it never came to fruition. Noonan and Sillas were to have reprised their roles, and the film would have also co-starred Louis C.K., Charlie Kaufman and Vin Diesel.

Awards
Preceded by Ruby in Paradise tied with Public Access	Sundance Grand Jury Prize: U.S. Dramatic; 1994	Succeeded by The Brothers McMullen
