= Adventureland (film) =

- Theatrical release poster
- Directed by: Greg Mottola
- Written by: Greg Mottola
- Produced by: Sidney Kimmel; Anne Carey; Ted Hope
- Starring: Jesse Eisenberg; Kristen Stewart; Martin Starr; Bill Hader; Kristen Wiig; Margarita Levieva; Ryan Reynolds
- Cinematography: Terry Stacey
- Edited by: Anne McCabe
- Music by: Yo La Tengo
- Production companies: Miramax Films; Sidney Kimmel Entertainment; This is that
- Distributed by: Miramax Films
- Release date: April 3, 2009
- Running time: 107 minutes
- Country: United States
- Language: English
- Budget: $9.8 million
- Box office: $17.2 million

Adventureland is a 2009 American romantic comedy-drama film written and directed by Greg Mottola. It stars Jesse Eisenberg, Kristen Stewart, Ryan Reynolds, Kristen Wiig, Bill Hader, Martin Starr, and Margarita Levieva. In the film, recent college graduate James Brennan (Eisenberg) takes a job at a run-down Pittsburgh amusement park to save up for grad school in New York.

The theme park is loosely based on the "Adventureland" local theme park in Farmingdale, a village on Long Island, New York. Released on April 3, 2009, the film received positive reviews and earned $17.1 million worldwide at the box office. It was nominated for "Best Ensemble Cast Performance" at the 19th Annual Gotham Independent Film Awards.

== Plot ==
In 1987, James Brennan's plans for a summer vacation in Europe after graduating from Oberlin College falls apart after his mother informs him of his father losing his job. Knowing that their current finances will not permit them to support him, James gets a job in the carnival games section at Adventureland, a local amusement park in his hometown of Pittsburgh, Pennsylvania, where his childhood friend Tommy Frigo works. Another games worker, Emily "Em" Lewin, saves James from being stabbed by a cheating customer and offers him a ride home that night.

With her father and stepmother out of town, Em throws a party, where she and James discover they share a similar taste in music. As they bond in the house's swimming pool, James realizes that he has an unfortunately timed erection; Frigo notices this mishap and announces it to the partygoers. After the party, Mike Connell, the park's maintenance man who is married and has been having an affair with Em, comes over and they have sex.

Despite the illicit affair between Em and Connell, James and Em continue to develop feelings for one another, establishing an easy rapport and sharing a similar sense of humor and taste in music. James and Connell also become closer as friends, with James confessing to Connell that he loves Em. Em, confused by her relationship with Connell and feelings for James, initially balks when James tells her how he feels about her. Saddened by her rejection, James seeks solace by going on a date with another employee at the amusement park, Lisa P., who is fawned over by most of the male staff. Ridden with guilt after kissing Lisa P., James tells Em about their date but says he'd rather continue to see Em. Moved by James's honesty, Em ends her affair with Connell. However, on the same night she does this, another of James's coworkers tells him he saw Em and Connell having sex in the back of Connell's car. Frigo drives James to Connell's mother's house, and they see Em leaving.

A distraught James confronts Em, who breaks down in tears and says she is stupid for continuing to see Connell while developing her relationship with James. James tells Lisa about the affair and asks her not to tell anyone, but she tells her friend Kelly, and soon afterwards, the news spreads throughout the park. Humiliated, Em quits and returns to NYU. James gets drunk, crashes his father's car into their neighbor's tree, and passes out. The impending repairs to the car cost James all of the money he made over the summer. Additionally, as matters worsen, one of his college roommates, Eric, decides to go to Harvard Business School instead of Columbia, leaving James with nowhere to live in New York City.

With help from Joel, another co-worker friend of James, James heads to New York and waits outside Em's apartment in the rain. When she arrives, she invites him in and they reconcile. James says he'll find a job, work out, and attend school next year. Em reveals that she still has an Adventureland shirt. After they head inside, they both kiss. James loses his virginity to Em, cementing their new relationship.

== Cast ==
- Jesse Eisenberg as James Brennan, a recent graduate of Oberlin College who majored in Comparative Literature and Renaissance Studies. He is an aspiring journalist planning to go to Columbia University in New York.
- Kristen Stewart as Em Lewin, one of James's Adventureland co-workers. She hates her stepmother and resents her father for remarrying so soon after her mother's death from cancer. She is a student at New York University majoring in Art History. She does not need to work, as her father is a rich lawyer, but she works at the theme park to get out of the house.
- Martin Starr as Joel, one of James's co-workers at the games in Adventureland. He is a college student studying Russian Literature and Slavic Languages, a degree which he claims will get him a job as a "cabbie, hot dog vendor," or "marijuana delivery guy."
- Kristen Wiig as Paulette, Bobby's wife and the manager of Adventureland. She is much quieter than her husband.
- Bill Hader as Bobby, Paulette's husband and the assistant manager of Adventureland. He is extremely intolerant of people who litter but very supportive of his employees and wife.
- Ryan Reynolds as Mike Connell, the park's maintenance man, married to a woman named Ronnie. He is also a part-time musician who claims to have jammed with Lou Reed. He has cheated on his wife with many women, including Em.
- Margarita Levieva as Lisa P., one of the ride operators at the Adventureland park. A seductive girl to whom all the park's employees are attracted. Her father was injured and is now unable to work, and she bonds with James after he shows some sympathy.
- Jack Gilpin as Mr. Brennan, James's father. He loses his job and transfers to a different office. He is an alcoholic, but he tries to hide his drinking from his family.
- Josh Pais as Mr. Lewin, Em's father and Francy's husband. He met Francy at a temple while his first wife was slowly dying in the hospital. He married Francy soon after Em's mother died.
- Wendie Malick as Mrs. Brennan, James's mother. She supplies the discipline of the two parents. At the end of the film, she decides to let James go to New York City.
- Mary Birdsong as Francy, Em's stepmother. She married Em's father shortly after the death of Em's mother. After her first divorce, she lost her hair from the stress of a nervous breakdown and wears a wig.
- Matt Bush as Tommy Frigo, James' childhood best friend. Although they aren't good friends anymore, James still manages to tolerate Frigo's immaturity and cruelty. Frigo constantly teases James and hits him in the testicles.
- Paige Howard as Sue O'Malley, Pete's sister, another of the young workers at Adventureland.
- Dan Bittner as Pete O'Malley, Sue's brother, another of the young workers at Adventureland.
- Michael Zegen as Eric, a college friend of James.
- Barrett Hackney as Munch, a young worker at Adventureland.
- Ryan McFarland as Brad, another college friend of James.

== Production ==
Adventureland was filmed in Pittsburgh, Pennsylvania, from October 2007 to December 2007, or possibly until January 2008, with most scenes shot in Kennywood, a historic amusement park in nearby West Mifflin, Pennsylvania. The park was "heavily" altered to look run-down. The theme park from the film is based on the Farmingdale, New York amusement park Adventureland where Mottola once worked in the 1980s. The scenes of the family home were filmed in a neighborhood named Fox Ridge located in the town of McCandless, a suburb still within Allegheny County, approximately 12 mi (19 km) north of the city of Pittsburgh. Other scenes were shot in Beaver County, Pennsylvania, and the airport area of Moon Township such as the Stardust Lounge.

The story takes place during the summer, but since it was shot in the winter months in Pittsburgh, Pennsylvania, crews had to often hide snowfall. In some instances, during indoor takes, extras were paid to stand outside surrounding the windows and doors to block the snow from falling behind the actors.

== Release ==
The film premiered at the 2009 Sundance Film Festival and was theatrically released on April 3, 2009. The film was also screened at the 2009 Edinburgh International Film Festival.

=== Home media ===
The film was released on August 25, 2009, on DVD and Blu-ray with unrated bonus features.

== Reception ==
=== Box office ===
In its first week at the box office, Adventureland opened moderately wide in only 1,862 screens grossing $5.7 million ranking #6 at the box office. Despite opening up in fourteen more screens in its second week Adventureland only took in $3.4 million, falling to #9 at the box office. The film concluded its U.S. domestic run on May 28, 2009 with a gross of $16,044,025 and a total international gross of $17,164,377.

=== Critical response ===
On Rotten Tomatoes, the film has an approval rating of 89% based on 218 reviews, with an average rating of 7.30/10. The site's critical consensus reads, "Full of humor and nostalgia, Adventureland is a sweet, insightful coming-of-age comedy that will resonate with teens and adults alike." On Metacritic, the film has a weighted average score of 76 out of 100, based on 34 critics, indicating "generally favorable" reviews.

Roger Ebert of the Chicago Sun-Times gave the film 3 out of 4 stars and wrote: "What surprised me was how much I admired Kristen Stewart, who in Twilight, was playing below her grade level. Here is an actress ready to do important things. Together, and with the others, they make Adventureland more real and more touching than it may sound." Variety's Todd McCarthy wrote: "A rather ordinary account of youthful summer misadventures that goes down easily thanks to a sparky cast, more than 40 pop tunes that anchor the action in the late '80s and characters who get high both on and off their jobs at a tacky amusement park."

=== Accolades ===
The film was nominated for a Gotham Independent Film Award for Best Ensemble Cast, scheduled in New York City on November 30, 2009.

Adventureland was the winner of High Times magazine's 2009 Stoner Movie of the Year Award. Kristen Stewart also received the High Times' 2009 Stonette of the Year Award, due in part to her performance in the film.

Jesse Eisenberg was nominated for Favorite Male Breakthrough Performance at the Teen Choice Awards for his performance in both Adventureland and Zombieland.

== Soundtrack ==
A total of 41 songs were licensed for use in the film. The soundtrack includes 14 songs and was released on April 1, 2009 by Hollywood Records. The songs included are mostly from the 1980s, to fit with the setting of the film, with several tracks from the late 1960s and early 1970s, most notably by The Velvet Underground, Lou Reed, the New York Dolls and cult darlings Big Star. The '80s bands represent a cross-section of alternative bands from the time including Hüsker Dü, The Jesus and Mary Chain, Nick Lowe, The Cure, The Replacements, and Crowded House.

The film maintains a notable reverence for Lou Reed, who is idolized by the main character, featured on T-shirts and posters of other cast members, and has likewise elevated the status of the playground mechanic stemming from a rumored jam session with the artist. Earlier versions of the script replaced Lou Reed with singer-songwriter Neil Young as the musician Ryan Reynolds's character had played with, and used Young's songs "Everybody Knows This Is Nowhere" and "Hey Hey, My My (Into The Black)" in key scenes.

Adventureland - Original Motion Picture Soundtrack
No.	Title	Writer(s)	Location where played in the film	Length
1.	"Satellite of Love"	Lou Reed	Played while Connell drives with James to help his mother	3:39
2.	"Modern Love"	David Bowie	Played in amusement park at 11:03	3:56
3.	"I'm in Love with a Girl"	Big Star	Played during Em's party	1:47
4.	"Just Like Heaven"	The Cure	Played during the bumper car sequence	3:31
5.	"Rock Me Amadeus"	Falco	Played frequently over the amusement park speakers, to most of the characters' annoyance	3:18
6.	"Don't Change"	INXS	Played over the credits	4:26
7.	"Your Love"	The Outfield	Played when Joel attempts to ask Sue out	3:42
8.	"Don't Dream It's Over"	Crowded House	Played during the fireworks scene at 41:46	3:54
9.	"Looking for a Kiss"	New York Dolls	Played during Em's party	3:18
10.	"Don't Want to Know if You Are Lonely"	Hüsker Dü	Plays as Em gives James a ride home	3:30
11.	"Unsatisfied"	The Replacements	Played as James arrives in Manhattan	4:00
12.	"Pale Blue Eyes"	Velvet Underground sung by Lou Reed	Played at 33:42 - 1st track on J's Favorite Bummer Songs mixtape	5:28
13.	"Farewell Adventureland"	Yo La Tengo		3:40
14.	"Adventureland Theme Song"	Brian Kenney & Ian Berkowitz		0:33

Adventureland - Additional Songs
No.	Title	Writer(s)	Location where played in the film	Length
1.	"Obsession"	Animotion	Characters dance to this in the Razzmatazz club
2.	"In the Ether"	Black Swan Lane
3.	"Point of No Return"	Exposé	Play in the Razzmatazz club at 49:15
4.	"Taste of Cindy acoustic version"	The Jesus and Mary Chain	Record played by Em when Connel comes to her house 26:11
5.	"Breaking the Law"	Judas Priest	Plays as James is chased through the park by an angry patron
6.	"In My House"	Mary Jane Girls	Plays when James and Lisa P are in the Razzmatazz club at 1:20:44
7.	"So It Goes"	Nick Lowe	Record played by Connell when he and Em meet at his mother's house
8.	"I Want Action"	Poison	Video played on TV in Em's room
9.	"Bastards of Young"	The Replacements	Played during the opening sequence
10.	"Tops"	The Rolling Stones	Played in the scene "Lisa P is back" at 27:11
11.	"Limelight"	Rush	Munch, one of the games workers, does a poor rendition in an attempt to impress Em, also included in the trailer
12.	"Let the Music Play"	Shannon	Plays as Lisa P dances in front of a thrill ride at 45:25
13.	"Here She Comes Now"	The Velvet Underground	Plays during opening credits, 5:05, as James's moves back home for the summer.
14.	"Blister in the Sun"	Violent Femmes	Used in the trailer
15.	"Dance Hall Days"	Wang Chung
16.	"Here I Go Again"	Whitesnake
