= Likely Story =

American film production company

- Type: Independent
- Industry: Film production
- Founded: October 27, 2006; 20 years ago
- Founders: Anthony Bregman; Stefanie Azpiazu
- Headquarters: New York City
- Area served: Los Angeles
- Website: www.likely-story.com

Likely Story is an independent film production company founded by its president and CEO Anthony Bregman in October 2006 with Stefanie Azpiazu. It is based in New York City with an office in Los Angeles.

== History ==
New York City-based producer Anthony Bregman founded the production company 'Likely Story' in October 2006 along with his longtime working partner Stefanie Azpiazu after he left This is That Productions. The company originally signed a deal with Warner Independent Pictures. Azpiazu, who had been the Head of Production and Development at the NYC-based office relocated to LA-based office with its opening in November 2011.

In June 2015, Likely Story hired Peter Cron as VP Production in the film division and Jeff Stern as VP Scripted Television in the TV division, while Ryan Featherman was promoted to Story Editor also in the TV division.

== Collaboration deals ==
Likely Story previously had a deal with PalmStar Media to produce films together since December 2013. The company now has a first-look deal with Netflix In 2018, it has a first look TV deal with Anonymous Content.

== Filmography ==
- 2008: Sleep Dealer
- 2008: Synecdoche, New York
- 2009: Carriers
- 2010: Please Give
- 2010: The Extra Man
- 2011: Our Idiot Brother
- 2011: The Oranges
- 2012: Lay the Favorite
- 2012: Darling Companion
- 2013: Enough Said
- 2013: Begin Again
- 2014: Every Secret Thing
- 2014: Foxcatcher
- 2015: American Ultra
- 2016: Sing Street
- 2016: Indignation
- 2016: The Whole Truth
- 2016: Collateral Beauty
- 2017: The Circle
- 2018: Every Day
- 2018: Private Life
- 2018: The Land of Steady Habits
- 2019: Someone Great
- 2020: Downhill
- 2020: The Half of It
- 2020: I'm Thinking of Ending Things
- 2020: Wild Mountain Thyme
- 2020: Topside
- 2021: Things Heard and Seen
- 2021: In the Heights
- 2022: Do Revenge
- 2023: Eileen
- 2023: You Hurt My Feelings
- 2023: Flora and Son
- 2024: Doin' It
- 2024: Here After
- 2026: Power Ballad
