= Hannah Weyer =

American filmmaker and writer

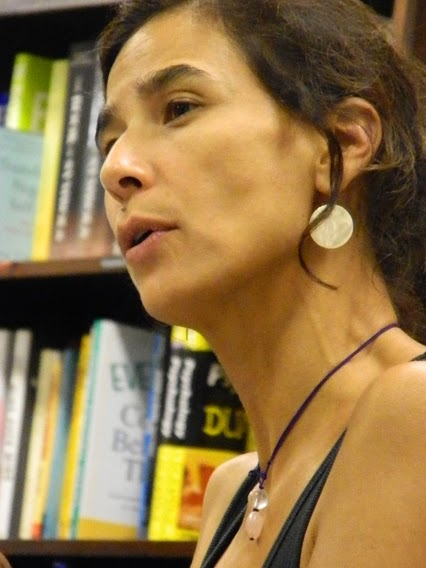
- Hannah Weyer visiting Barnes & Noble in New York.
- Occupation: Film maker
- Years active: 1994–present
- Website: http://www.hannahweyer.com

Hannah Weyer is an American filmmaker and writer living in New York, who has written, directed and produced narrative and documentary films. Her films have screened at the Human Rights Watch, Sundance and the New York Film Festivals and won recognitions, including awards from LoCarno, Sundance, Doubletake Documentary and South by Southwest Film Festivals. Her documentaries, La Boda and La Escuela (distributed by Women Make Movies) aired on PBS as part of the POV-American Documentary series. Screenwriting credits include work that premiered on HBO, including Life Support (2007), directed by Nelson George, which earned a Golden Globe Award for its lead actress, Queen Latifah.

Other writing credits include a novel set in Far Rockaway, Queens entitled, On the Come Up, which was published by Nan Talese/Knopf in 2013. It received a 2013 Barnes and Noble Discover Great New Writers Award and Weyer was an NAACP Image Award for Debut Author nominee. Most recently, her short story, "Sanctuary City", won the 2018 Danahy Fiction Prize and will be published in Tampa Review's Fall/Winter 2018 issue.

== Career ==
Weyer received her master's degree in film from New York University in 1994.

Her short film, The Salesman and Other Adventures won awards at the Sundance, Locarno, Melbourne, and Claremont-Ferrand Film Festivals. It was broadcast on Canal+ France, Canal+ Spain, Italy's EDB, Channel 4 in England, and in the US on PBS.

In 2000, Weyer produced and directed La Boda, an hour-long documentary which screened at the Human Rights Watch Film Festival and the New York and Los Angeles Latino Film Festivals. La Boda first aired nationally as part of the PBS program, POV-American Documentary, and then again as an "encore performance" during the series' 2001 line-up.

Weyer then went on to complete, La Escuela which premiered on POV-American Documentary during its 2002 season. La Escuela received Special Jury Prizes from the San Antonio Film Festival and South by Southwest and was awarded the MTV News/Doc Award at the Doubletake Documentary Film Festival. It was selected by the Young Adult Library Services Association (YALSA) as one of 2003's top 10 Documentaries for Young Adults.

Weyer frequently collaborates with writer/director Jim Mckay (Girls Town, Our Song, Everyday People). Along with Mckay she co-wrote the film, Angel Rodriguez (2005) which premiered on HBO. She also co-wrote the HBO film, Life Support (2007), directed by Nelson George.

For the past 15 years, Hannah has worked with teens in the media arts, volunteering at The Door, Scenarios USA, and Reel Works, and, along with filmmaker Jim McKay started an after school film club at a progressive high school in Brooklyn.

== Filmography ==
- Life Support (2007) (TV) [Writer] (written by)
- Angel (2005) (TV) [Writer] (written by) ... a.k.a. Angel Rodriguez - USA (TV title)
- Gravel (2003) [script consultant]
- Escuela (2002) [Director] [producer]
- From an Objective Point of View (2002) [Director]
- La boda (2000) (TV) [Director] [producer] [camera operator] [sound]
- Arresting Gena (1997) [Director] [Writer] (writer)
- The Salesman and Other Adventures (1995) [Director] [Writer] [producer] [Editor]
