= The Savages (film) =

2007 film by Tamara Jenkins

- Theatrical release poster by Chris Ware
- Directed by: Tamara Jenkins
- Written by: Tamara Jenkins
- Produced by: Ted Hope; Anne Carey; Erica Westheimer
- Starring: Laura Linney; Philip Seymour Hoffman; Philip Bosco
- Cinematography: Mott Hupfel
- Edited by: Brian A. Kates
- Music by: Stephen Trask
- Production companies: This is that; Ad Hominem Enterprises; Lone Star Film Group; Cooper's Town Productions
- Distributed by: Fox Searchlight Pictures
- Release dates: January 19, 2007 (Sundance); November 28, 2007 (United States)
- Running time: 113 minutes
- Country: United States
- Language: English
- Budget: $8 million
- Box office: $10.6 million

The Savages is a 2007 American black comedy-drama film written and directed by Tamara Jenkins. It stars Laura Linney, Philip Seymour Hoffman, and Philip Bosco (in his final film before his death in 2018).

It had its world premiere at the 2007 Sundance Film Festival on January 19, 2007. It was released on November 28, 2007, by Fox Searchlight Pictures. It received critical acclaim. At the 80th Academy Awards, it earned two nominations: Best Actress (for Linney) and Best Original Screenplay (for Jenkins). At the 65th Golden Globe Awards, it was nominated for Best Actor in a Musical or Comedy (for Seymour Hoffman).

== Plot ==
After drifting apart over the years, two single siblings—Jon and Wendy, the younger of the two—band together to care for their estranged, elderly father, Lenny, who is rapidly slipping into dementia. Wendy and Jon first travel to Sun City, Arizona, to attend the funeral of Lenny's girlfriend of twenty years. When they arrive, they are told that Lenny signed a non-marriage agreement and will not have rights to any of her property. They then move him to a nursing home in Buffalo, where Jon is a theater professor working on a book about Bertolt Brecht. Wendy, a struggling playwright, moves from New York City to help establish their father in Buffalo.

Neither of the siblings is close with Lenny. It is implied that he was a physically and emotionally abusive father when Jon and Wendy were growing up and they cut him out of their lives. They were also abandoned by their mother at a young age. Their dysfunctional family life appears to have left Wendy and Jon emotionally crippled and unable to sustain relationships. Wendy is sleeping with an unattainable married man thirteen years her senior and Jon cannot commit to a Polish woman who must return to Kraków after her visa expires.

After her father's death, Wendy has broken up with her married lover but has adopted his dog, which he had planned to put down. She is also working on the production of her play about their childhood. Jon leaves for a conference in Poland where it is suggested he may reconnect with the woman he had let go. The film closes with Wendy running with her lover's dog alive, running with the aid of a wheeled hip cast.

== Cast ==
- Laura Linney as Wendy Savage
- Philip Seymour Hoffman as Jon Savage
- Philip Bosco as Lenny Savage
- Peter Friedman as Larry
- Gbenga Akinnagbe as Jimmy
- Cara Seymour as Kasia
- Debra Monk as Nancy Lachman
- David Zayas as Eduardo
- Margo Martindale as Roz
- Guy Boyd as Bill Lachman
- Rosemary Murphy as Doris Metzger
- Tonye Patano as Mrs. Robinson
- Kristine Nielsen as Nurse
- Tijuana Ricks as Valley View Nurse

== Production ==
Filming took place from 10 April to early June 2006 in the Buffalo area of New York.

== Reception ==
=== Critical reception ===
The film received very favorable reviews from critics. The review aggregator Rotten Tomatoes reported that 89% of critics gave the film positive reviews, based on 171 reviews, and an average rating of 7.5/10. The site's consensus states: "Thanks to a tender, funny script from director Tamara Jenkins, and fine performances from Philip Seymour Hoffman and Laura Linney, this film delivers a nuanced, beautifully three-dimensional look at the struggles and comforts of family bonds." Metacritic reported the film had an average score of 85 out of 100, based on 35 reviews, indicating "universal acclaim".

Time magazine's Richard Schickel named the film #7 of his Top 10 Movies of 2007, and praises both the cast and writer-director:

These actors are unimprovable as, somehow, they find a certain decency under the pressure of their grinding familial chore, a reason to hope that slightly better days may be ahead for them once their duty has been done. Writer-director Tamara Jenkins is less interested in heroically inspiring us than she is in showing us the values to be found in the more modest forms of dutifulness.

=== Top 10 lists ===
The film appeared on many critics' top 10 lists of the best films of 2007.

- 1st - Carina Chocano, Los Angeles Times (tied with The Diving Bell and the Butterfly)
- 3rd - Ella Taylor, LA Weekly (tied with Away from Her)
- 3rd - Sheri Linden, The Hollywood Reporter
- 5th - David Edelstein, New York magazine
- 5th - Marjorie Baumgarten, The Austin Chronicle
- 6th - Lawrence Toppman, The Charlotte Observer
- 7th - Kirk Honeycutt, The Hollywood Reporter
- 7th - Peter Hartlaub, San Francisco Chronicle
- 7th - Richard Schickel, TIME magazine
- 8th - Frank Scheck, The Hollywood Reporter
- 8th - Nathan Rabin, The A.V. Club
- 8th - Ray Bennett, The Hollywood Reporter
- 9th - A. O. Scott, The New York Times (tied with Away from Her)
- 10th - Carrie Rickey, The Philadelphia Inquirer
- 10th - Manohla Dargis, The New York Times (7-way tie)

=== Accolades ===
- 80th Academy Awards
  - Academy Award for Best Actress (Laura Linney)
  - Academy Award for Best Original Screenplay (Tamara Jenkins)
- Central Ohio Film Critics Association Awards
  - Actor of the Year (Philip Seymour Hoffman) -- WON (Also for: Before the Devil Knows You're Dead and Charlie Wilson's War)
- Chicago Film Critics Association Awards
  - Best Actress (Laura Linney)
  - Best Screenplay, Original (Tamara Jenkins)
- 65th Golden Globe Awards
  - Best Performance by an Actor in a Motion Picture – Musical or Comedy (Philip Seymour Hoffman)
- Gotham Awards
  - Best Ensemble Cast (Philip Bosco, Philip Seymour Hoffman, Laura Linney)
- Independent Spirit Awards
  - Best Cinematography (W. Mott Hupfel III)
  - Best Director (Tamara Jenkins)
  - Best Male Lead (Philip Seymour Hoffman) -- WON
  - Best Screenplay (Tamara Jenkins) -- WON
- London Critics Circle Film Awards
  - Actress of the Year (Laura Linney)
- Los Angeles Film Critics Association Awards
  - Best Screenplay (Tamara Jenkins) -- WON
- National Society of Film Critics Awards
  - Best Screenplay (Tamara Jenkins) -- WON
- Nilsson Awards for Film
  - Best Picture
  - Best Actor in a Leading Role (Philip Seymour Hoffman)
  - Best Actress in a Leading Role (Laura Linney)
  - Best Actor in a Supporting Role (Philip Bosco)
  - Best Original Screenplay (Tamara Jenkins)
  - Best Cast
  - Best Original Score
- Online Film Critics Society Awards
  - Best Actress (Laura Linney)
- San Francisco Film Critics Circle Awards
  - Best Screenplay - Original (Tamara Jenkins) -- WON
- Satellite Awards
  - Best Actress in a Motion Picture, Drama (Laura Linney)
- Women Film Critics Circle Awards
  - Best Actress (Laura Linney) -- WON
- Writers Guild of America Awards
  - Best Original Screenplay (Tamara Jenkins)
