= Anne Carey =

American film producer

Anne Carey is President of Production at Archer Gray, a media production, finance, and venture investment company based in New York City. In her career as an independent producer, Carey has been associated with filmmakers such as Ang Lee, Anton Corbijn, Bill Condon, Todd Field, Greg Mottola, Tamara Jenkins, Alan Ball, Mike Mills and Nicole Holofcener. Carey’s films have been distributed by Fox Searchlight Pictures, Sony Pictures Classics, Warner Independent Pictures, Focus Features, Miramax and HBO; and her films have played and premiered at major domestic and international film festivals including the Sundance Film Festival, the Berlin International Film Festival and the Toronto International Film Festival.

== Filmography ==
Producer

- Ride with the Devil (1999) (Associate producer)
- The Door in the Floor (2004)
- The Ex (2006)
- The Savages (2007)
- Trainwreck: My Life as an Idiot (2007)
- Adventureland (2009)
- The American (2010)
- Little Accidents (2014)
- Goodbye to All That (2014)
- Ten Thousand Saints (2015)
- The Diary of a Teenage Girl (2015)
- Mr. Holmes (2015)
- 20th Century Women (2016)
- Can You Ever Forgive Me? (2018)
- The Operative (2019)
- The Day Shall Come (2019)
- Lost Girls (2020)
- The Persian Version (2023)
- The Young Wife (2023)

Executive producer

- The Laramie Project (2002) (TV movie)
- Thumbsucker (2005)
- Friends with Money (2006)
- Towelhead (2007)
- The Strange Ones (2017)
- Minyan (2020)
- Dead Ringers (2023) (Miniseries), winner of a Peabody Award in the entertainment category at the 84th Peabody Awards in 2024
- Rubber Hut (TBA)

Thanks

- The Tao of Steve (2000)
- Eternal Sunshine of the Spotless Mind (2004)
- Smother (2008)
- Goodbye Solo (2008)
- California Solo (2012)
- B-Side (2013)
- Experimenter (2015)
- The Adderall Diaries (2015)
- Christine (2016)
- Monsters and Men (2018)
- Leave No Trace (2018)
- Kajillionaire (2020)
