= List of awards and nominations received by Catherine Keener =

Catherine Keener awards and nominations
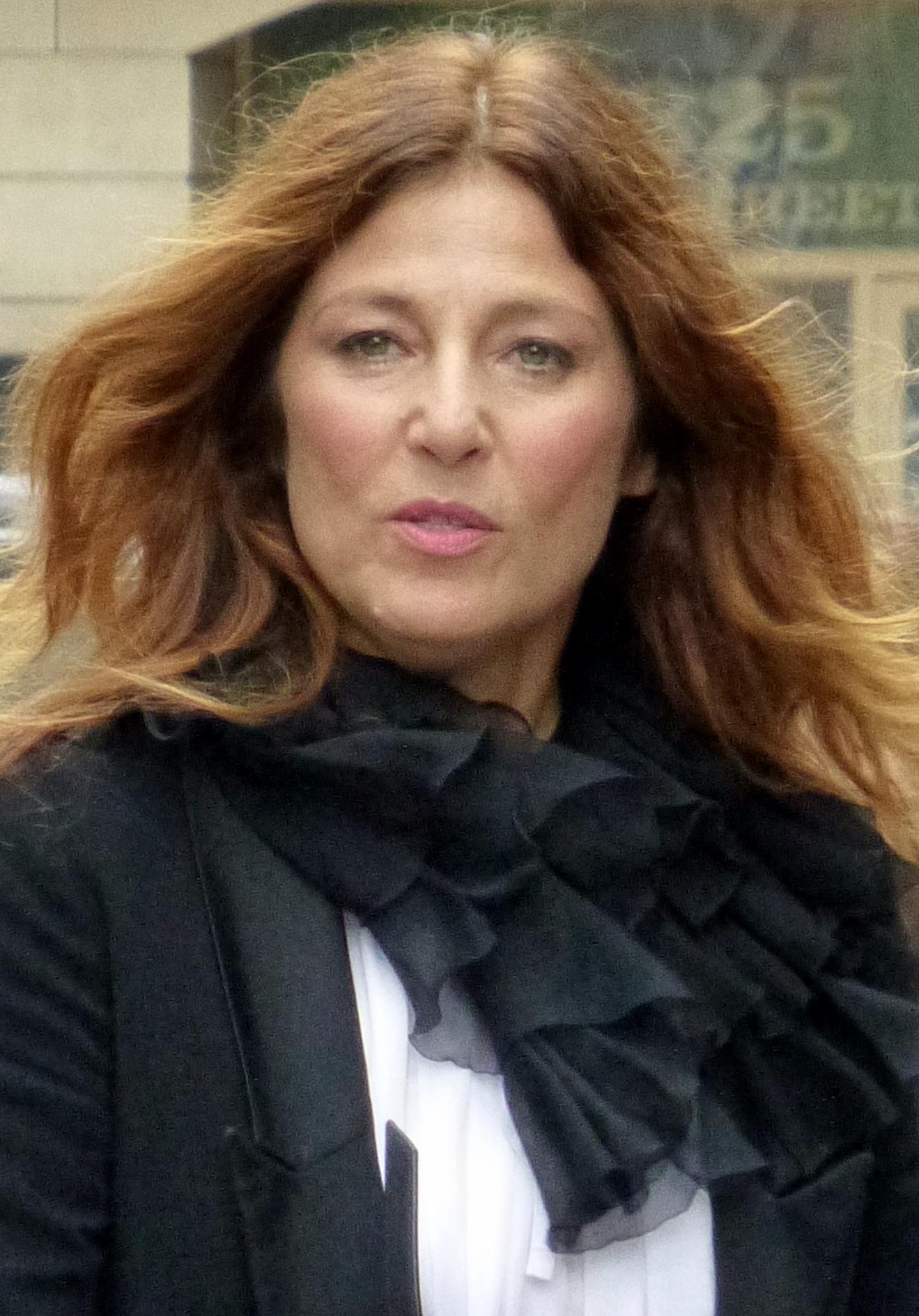
- Keener at the Toronto International Film Festival in September 2014
Award	Wins	Nominations
Totals
Academy Awards	0	2
British Academy Film Awards	0	1
Golden Globe Awards	0	2
Gotham Awards	1	2
Independent Spirit Awards	1	4
Primetime Emmy Awards	0	1
Satellite Awards	1	3
Saturn Awards	0	2
Screen Actors Guild Awards	0	7
Various critics associations	9	17
Wins	12
Nominations	40

Catherine Keener is an American actress with an extensive body of film work who has received various awards and nominations, including a Satellite Award and an Independent Spirit Award. Additionally, she has been nominated for two Academy Awards, two Golden Globe Awards, a BAFTA Award, and a Primetime Emmy Award.

== Academy Awards ==
The Academy Awards are a set of awards given by the Academy of Motion Picture Arts and Sciences annually for excellence of cinematic achievements.

Year	Nominated work	Category	Result	Ref.
1999	Being John Malkovich	Best Supporting Actress	Nominated	
2005	Capote	Best Supporting Actress	Nominated	

== British Academy Film Awards ==
The British Academy Film Award is an annual award show presented by the British Academy of Film and Television Arts.

Year	Nominated work	Category	Result	Ref.
2006	Capote	Best Actress in a Supporting Role	Nominated	

== Golden Globe Awards ==
The Golden Globe Award is an accolade bestowed by the 93 members of the Hollywood Foreign Press Association (HFPA) recognizing excellence in film and television, both domestic and foreign.

Year	Nominated work	Category	Result	Ref.
1999	Being John Malkovich	Best Supporting Actress – Motion Picture	Nominated	
2008	An American Crime	Best Actress – Miniseries or Television Film	Nominated	

== Gotham Awards ==
Presented by the Independent Filmmaker Project, the Gotham Awards award the best in independent film.

Year	Nominated work and artist	Category	Result	Ref.
2008	Synecdoche, New York	Best Ensemble Performance	Won	
2010	Please Give	Best Ensemble Performance	Nominated	

== Independent Spirit Awards ==
The Independent Spirit Awards are presented annually by Film Independent, to award best in the independent film community.

Year	Nominated work	Category	Result	Ref.
1992	Johnny Suede	Best Female Lead	Nominated	
1996	Walking and Talking	Best Female Lead	Nominated	
2002	Lovely & Amazing	Best Female Lead	Nominated	
2008	Synecdoche, New York	Robert Altman Award	Won	

== Primetime Emmy Awards ==
The Primetime Emmy Award is an American award bestowed by the Academy of Television Arts & Sciences (ATAS) in recognition of excellence in American primetime television programming.

Year	Nominated work	Category	Result	Ref.
2008	An American Crime	Outstanding Lead Actress in a Miniseries or a Movie	Nominated	

== Satellite Awards ==
The Satellite Awards are a set of annual awards given by the International Press Academy.

Year	Nominated work	Category	Result	Ref.
1999	Being John Malkovich	Best Supporting Actress – Musical or Comedy	Won	
2002	Lovely and Amazing	Best Actress – Motion Picture Musical or Comedy	Nominated	
2011	Please Give	Best Actress – Motion Picture Musical or Comedy	Nominated	

== Saturn Awards ==
The Saturn Award is an award presented annually by the Academy of Science Fiction, Fantasy and Horror Films; it was initially created to honor science fiction, fantasy, and horror on film, but has since grown to reward other films belonging to genre fiction, as well as on television and home media releases.

Year	Nominated work	Category	Result	Ref.
1999	Being John Malkovich	Best Actress	Nominated	
2009	Where the Wild Things Are	Best Actress	Nominated	

== Screen Actors Guild Awards ==
The Screen Actors Guild Awards are organized by the Screen Actors Guild‐American Federation of Television and Radio Artists (SAG-AFTRA). First awarded in 1995, the awards aim to recognize excellent achievements in film and television.

Year	Nominated work	Category	Result	Ref.
1999	Being John Malkovich	Outstanding Performance by a Female Actor in a Supporting Role	Nominated	
1999	Being John Malkovich	Outstanding Performance by a Cast in a Motion Picture	Nominated	
2005	Capote	Outstanding Performance by a Female Actor in a Supporting Role	Nominated	
2005	Capote	Outstanding Performance by a Cast in a Motion Picture	Nominated	
2007	Into the Wild	Outstanding Performance by a Female Actor in a Supporting Role	Nominated	
2007	Into the Wild	Outstanding Performance by a Cast in a Motion Picture	Nominated	
2017	Get Out	Outstanding Performance by a Cast in a Motion Picture	Nominated	

== Critics associations and other awards ==
Year	Nominated work	Association	Category	Result
1999	Being John Malkovich	Florida Film Critics Circle Award	Best Supporting Actress	Won
1999	Being John Malkovich	Kansas City Film Critics Circle Award	Best Supporting Actress	Won
1999	Being John Malkovich	New York Film Critics Circle Award	Best Supporting Actress	Won
1999	Being John Malkovich	Online Film Critics Society Award	Best Supporting Actress	Won
1999	Being John Malkovich	Southeastern Film Critics Association Award	Best Supporting Actress	Won
1999	Being John Malkovich	Chicago Film Critics Association Award	Best Supporting Actress	Nominated
1999	Being John Malkovich	Las Vegas Film Critics Society Award	Best Supporting Actress	Nominated
2005	The 40-Year-Old Virgin, The Ballad of Jack and Rose & Capote	Boston Society of Film Critics Award	Best Supporting Actress	Won
2005	The 40-Year-Old Virgin, The Ballad of Jack and Rose, Capote & The Interpreter	Los Angeles Film Critics Association Award	Best Supporting Actress	Won
2005	Capote	Dallas-Fort Worth Film Critics Association Award	Best Supporting Actress	Won
2005	Capote	Toronto Film Critics Association Awards	Best Supporting Actress	Won
2005	Capote	Broadcast Film Critics Association Award	Best Supporting Actress	Nominated
2005	Capote	Chicago Film Critics Association Award	Best Supporting	Nominated
2005	Capote	Online Film Critics Society Award	Best Supporting Actress	Nominated
2005	Capote	Washington DC Area Film Critics Association Award	Best Supporting Actress	Nominated
2007	Into the Wild	Broadcast Film Critics Association Award	Best Supporting	Nominated
2007	Into the Wild	Houston Film Critics Society Awards	Best Supporting Actress	Nominated
