= Robert Frazen =

American film and television editor

- Occupation: Film editor
- Years active: 1982–present

Robert Frazen, A.C.E., is an American film and television editor. He was nominated for the 1995 ACE Eddie Award for Best Edited One-Hour Series for Television for My So-Called Life and won a 2000 ACE Eddie Award for Best Edited Episode from a Television Mini-Series for The '60s. In addition to this, Frazen won the Satellite Award for Best Editing for his work on Nicole Holofcener's Please Give. Frazen is represented by ICM.

== Filmography ==
=== Film ===
Year	Film	Director	Notes
2000	Here on Earth	Mark Piznarski	
2001	Lovely & Amazing	Nicole Holofcener	
2004	Breakin' All the Rules	Daniel Taplitz	
2004	Admissions	Melissa Painter	
2005	The Great New Wonderful	Danny Leiner	
2006	Friends with Money	Nicole Holofcener	
2006	Smokin' Aces	Joe Carnahan	
2008	Smart People	Noam Murro	
2008	Synecdoche, New York	Charlie Kaufman	
2010	The Company Men	John Wells	
2010	Please Give	Nicole Holofcener	Winner - Satellite Award for Best Editing
2013	Big Sur	Michael Polish	
2013	Enough Said	Nicole Holofcener	
2015	The Family Fang	Jason Bateman	
2016	The Founder	John Lee Hancock	
2018	The Land of Steady Habits	Nicole Holofcener	
2019	The Highwaymen	John Lee Hancock	
2020	I'm Thinking of Ending Things	Charlie Kaufman	
2021	The Little Things	John Lee Hancock	
2022	Causeway	Lila Neugebauer	
2022	Mr. Harrigan's Phone	John Lee Hancock	
2024	On Swift Horses	Daniel Minahan	
TBA	Monsanto	John Lee Hancock	

Editorial department

Year	Film	Director	Role	Notes
1982	I Ought to Be in Pictures	Herbert Ross	Apprentice editor	
1983	The Outsiders	Francis Ford Coppola	Apprentice editor	Uncredited
1983	Cross Creek	Martin Ritt	Assistant editor	
1984	The River	Mark Rydell	Assistant film editor	
1985	Murphy's Romance	Martin Ritt	Assistant editor	
1986	Wisdom	Emilio Estevez	Assistant editor	
1987	Someone to Watch Over Me	Ridley Scott	Assistant editor	
1987	Nuts	Martin Ritt	First assistant film editor	
1988	Arthur 2: On the Rocks	Bud Yorkin	Assistant editor	
1989	Indiana Jones and the Last Crusade	Steven Spielberg	Assistant editor	Uncredited
1989	Glory	Edward Zwick	Assistant editor	
1990	Predator 2	Stephen Hopkins	Assistant editor	
1991	King Ralph	David S. Ward	Assistant editor	
1991	Point Break	Kathryn Bigelow	Assistant editor	
1993	Jack the Bear	Marshall Herskovitz	Associate editor	
1994	Legends of the Fall	Edward Zwick	Additional editor	
2002	Igby Goes Down	Burr Steers	Additional film editor	
2012	The Perks of Being a Wallflower	Stephen Chbosky	Additional editor	
2013	Fading Gigolo	John Turturro	Additional editor	

Thanks

Year	Film	Director	Role
2016	Gold	Stephen Gaghan	Special thanks

=== Television ===
Year	Title	Director	Other notes
1993	Sirens	Various	
1994	My So-Called Life	Various	5 episodes Nominated - ACE Eddie Award
1995	Party of Five	Ellen S. Pressman	1 episode
1996	Relativity	Mark Piznarski	Pilot episode. Various episodes
1999	The '60s (TV movie)	Mark Piznarski	Winner - ACE Eddie Award
1999	Felicity	Various	3 episodes (also main title sequence designer)
2000	Roswell	Frederick King Keller	1 episode
2002	Leap of Faith	Nicole Holofcener	Pilot episode
2002	Everwood	Mark Piznarski	Pilot episode
2004	Veronica Mars	Mark Piznarski	Pilot episode
2012	Girls	Lena Dunham	Pilot episode Nominated - ACE Eddie Award
2014	How and Why	Charlie Kaufman	Pilot episode

Editorial department

Year	Title	Director	Role	Notes
1986	Dress Gray	Glenn Jordan	Assistant editor	2 episodes
