= Enough Said =

2013 American romantic comedy-drama film by Nicole Holofcener

- Theatrical release poster
- Directed by: Nicole Holofcener
- Written by: Nicole Holofcener
- Produced by: Anthony Bregman; Stefanie Azpiazu
- Starring: Julia Louis-Dreyfus; James Gandolfini; Catherine Keener; Toni Collette; Ben Falcone
- Cinematography: Xavier Pérez Grobet
- Edited by: Robert Frazen; Nick Moore
- Music by: Marcelo Zarvos
- Production companies: Fox Searchlight Pictures; Likely Story; Ingenious Media; Big Screen Productions
- Distributed by: Fox Searchlight Pictures
- Release dates: September 7, 2013 (TIFF); September 18, 2013 (United States)
- Running time: 93 minutes
- Country: United States
- Language: English
- Budget: $8 million
- Box office: $25.6 million

Enough Said is a 2013 American romantic comedy drama film written and directed by Nicole Holofcener. The film stars Julia Louis-Dreyfus, James Gandolfini, Catherine Keener, Toni Collette and Ben Falcone. Louis-Dreyfus plays Eva, a divorced masseuse who begins a relationship with Albert (Gandolfini), only to discover that he is the former husband of her client and friend Marianne (Keener).

Holofcener wrote the script, which was partly inspired by her own life, after she was approached by two producers from Fox Searchlight Pictures who offered to produce her next project. It was filmed in Los Angeles. Gandolfini died after the film was completed but before it was released; Holofcener dedicated the film to him.

Enough Said premiered at the 2013 Toronto International Film Festival and was released on what would have been Gandolfini's 52nd birthday, September 18, 2013. The film was a box office success, earning $25 million against a budget of $8 million. It was also critically well-received attracting praise for Louis-Dreyfus and Gandolfini's performances and Holofcener's screenplay. It received several major award nominations, including for a Golden Globe for Louis-Dreyfus (her first nomination for a film role), a Screen Actors Guild Award, two Independent Spirit Awards and four Critics' Choice Movie Awards.

== Plot ==
Eva, a massage therapist and the divorced mother of a teenage girl, attends a party in Pacific Palisades with her friends, married couple Will and Sarah. There she meets a poet, Marianne, and Will introduces Eva to one of his friends, Albert. After the party, Albert asks Will for Eva's number and, although hesitant since she is not physically attracted to him, Eva agrees to go on a date with Albert, which goes well. Marianne contacts Eva for a massage, and after taking an immediate liking to one another they become friends.

Eva finds herself growing fonder of Albert and they have lunch with his teenage daughter, Tess, who, like Eva's daughter Ellen, is graduating from high school and moving away to attend college. A few days later, Eva goes to her massage appointment with Marianne and realizes that Albert is Marianne's ex-husband after Marianne tells a story about how he manages to pick out onions when scooping salsa — the same story Albert had told Eva, but about guacamole. Tess then arrives at the house and Eva's suspicions are confirmed. Marianne tries to introduce Eva to Tess, but Eva hides behind a tree to avoid the meeting. Eva continues seeing Albert, keeping her friendship with Marianne a secret; likewise, she does not tell Marianne that she is seeing Albert.

Eva encourages Marianne to voice her complaints about Albert so she can identify potential problems in her own relationship with him. At the encouragement of Eva, Sarah and Will invite her and Albert to a dinner party, which ends badly after Eva nitpicks over Albert's faults, which upsets him. At another appointment with Marianne, Eva is exposed when Albert arrives to drop Tess off. He is angry that Eva kept her friendship with Marianne a secret, and breaks up with her.

Eva and her ex-husband take Ellen to the airport for her flight to college. A few months later, on Thanksgiving Day, Eva drives by Albert's home and stops in front of the house on her way to pick up Ellen from the airport. Albert sees her and she awkwardly waves. He eventually comes outside, to Eva's surprise, and sits with her on the porch. Their conversation is reminiscent of their interactions when they started dating.

== Production ==
=== Background and writing ===
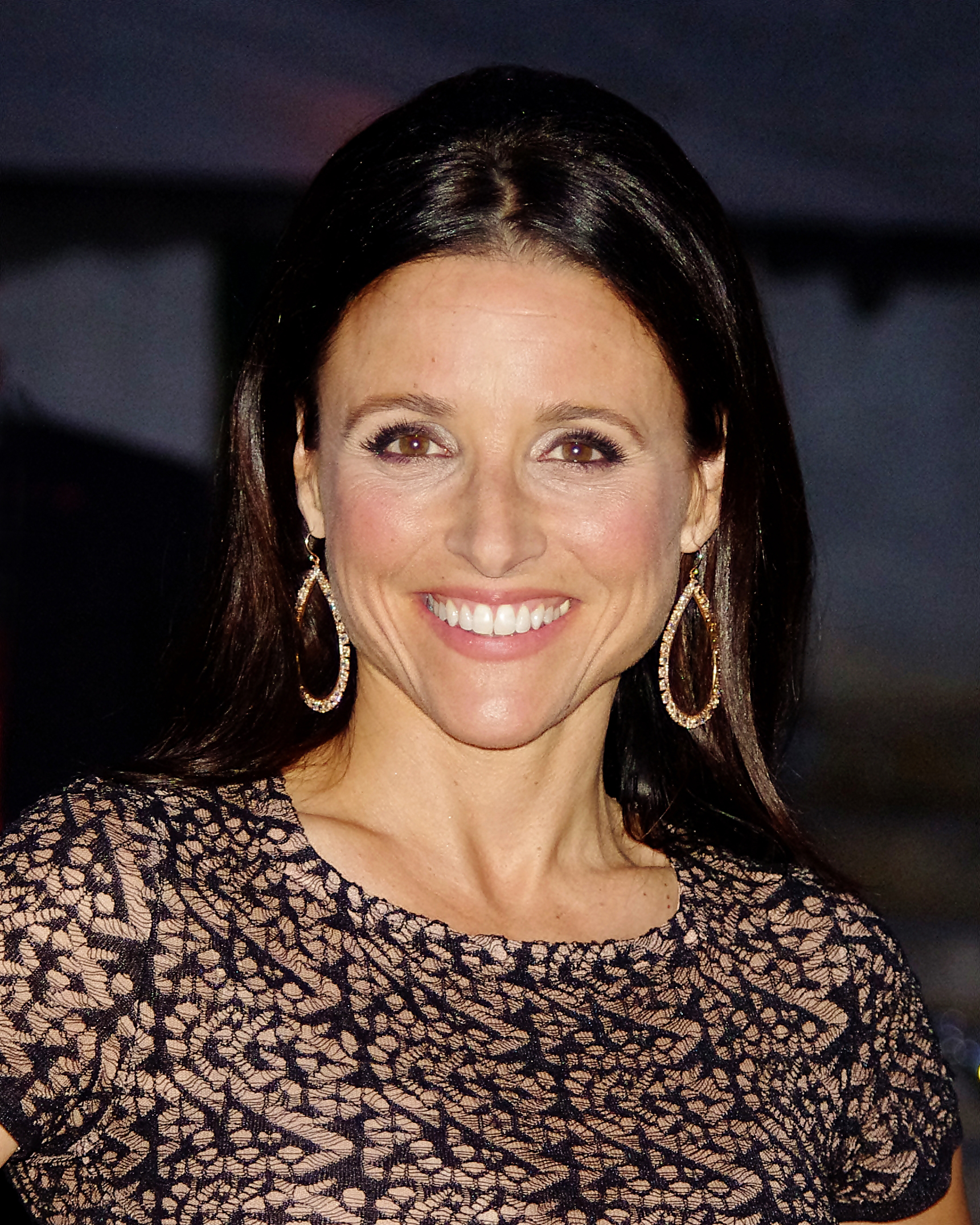
Julia Louis-Dreyfus was cast after approaching writer/director Nicole Holofcener about a role.

Enough Said was the fifth film written and directed by Nicole Holofcener. After the release of her fourth film, Please Give (2010), she was approached by Matthew Greenfield and Claudia Lewis from Fox Searchlight, who offered to produce Holofcener's next project on the condition that it was more mainstream than her previous films. She wrote three drafts of the screenplay over six months.

The premise was partly inspired by Holofcener's own life as a divorced mother of two teenagers and her "feelings and fears about what [her] life will be like when [her] kids go away". While writing the film, she said, "I was having thoughts about my ex-husband and my new boyfriend and thinking about being married and how I'm trying to have a relationship that's happier the second time." Small details of the plot were also drawn from her life; Albert's guacamole-eating habit was inspired by a story that her boyfriend told her about his ex-wife.

=== Cast ===
- Julia Louis-Dreyfus as Eva
- James Gandolfini as Albert
- Catherine Keener as Marianne
- Toni Collette as Sarah
- Tavi Gevinson as Chloe
- Ben Falcone as Will
- Tracey Fairaway as Ellen
- Eve Hewson as Tess
- Toby Huss as Peter
- Anjelah Johnson as Cathy
- Michaela Watkins as Hilary
- Amy Landecker as Debbie
- Jessica St. Clair as Cynthia
- Christopher Nicholas Smith as Hal
- Kathleen Rose Perkins as Fran
- Phillip Brock as Jason

Neither Julia Louis-Dreyfus nor James Gandolfini was Holofcener's first choice to play the lead roles. Louis-Dreyfus was cast after she approached Holofcener to express her interest in appearing in one of Holofcener's films. Holofcener's first choice as Albert was Louis C.K., who read part of the script but was not interested in the role. Gandolfini did not feel that he was right for the part, but Holofcener later described him as "perfect". Catherine Keener, who played Marianne, is a frequent collaborator of Holofcener's, having appeared in all four previous films that Holofcener had directed.

=== Filming and editing ===
The film was shot on location over 24 days in Los Angeles, with a budget of $8 million. It was filmed by cinematographer Xavier Pérez Grobet, with whom Holofcener had previously worked on the HBO television series Enlightened. Although each scene was scripted, the actors would often ad-lib lines of dialogue. The final scene of the film, in which Eva and Albert reunite in front of his house, was improvised by Louis-Dreyfus and Gandolfini.

The film was edited by Robert Frazen, Holofcener's boyfriend at the time, who had also worked on all four of her previous films. Gandolfini died of a heart attack in June 2013, almost a year after production on the film had ended but before it was released. The film's editing was complete by then but Holofcener added a dedication to the end-credits reading "For Jim". Gandolfini never saw the completed film.

== Sound ==
The film's score was composed by Marcelo Zarvos, collaborating with Holofcener for the second time after Please Give (2010). The score was recorded at the AIR Studios in London. Zarvos wanted the score to have minimalistic sounds that communicate the feelings between the lead pair, Eva and Albert. Zarvos utilized acoustic instruments and minimal orchestra to score the film. It was released through Fox Music on September 17, 2013, a day before the film's release. It was shortlisted but not nominated for the Academy Award for Best Original Score at the 86th Academy Awards.

== Release ==
Enough Said premiered on September 7, 2013 at the Toronto International Film Festival and was released theatrically shortly thereafter on September 18, 2013. On its opening weekend, the film earned $240,000 from four theaters for a $60,000 per-theater average, ranking among 2013's best specialty release openers. It received a wide release on September 27 and gradually expanded to a peak of 835 theaters in late October. Over 121 days in theaters, the film grossed $17.6 million at the U.S. box office. It earned $7.7 million from other countries, making a total worldwide gross of $25.3 million.

The film was released on DVD and Blu-ray formats on January 14, 2014. The Blu-ray disc includes six making-of featurettes, titled "Second Takes", "Cast", "Story", "Meet Eva and Albert", "Nicole Holofcener" and "Julia".

== Reception ==
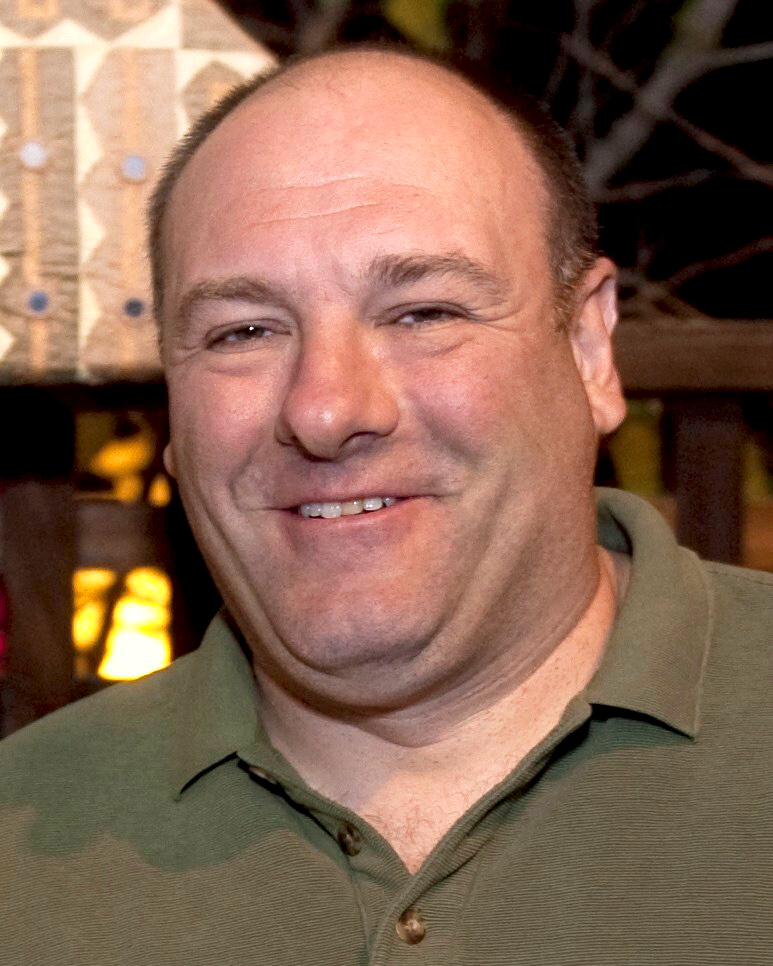
James Gandolfini, who died before Enough Said was released and to whom the film was dedicated, was commended for his performance.

=== Critical response ===
Enough Said received positive reviews from critics. Of 190 reviews collated on Rotten Tomatoes, 95% were positive; the website's critical consensus reads, "Wryly charming, impeccably acted, and ultimately quite bittersweet, Enough Said is a grown-up movie in the best possible way." Another review aggregation website, Metacritic, gave the film a score of 78 out of 100, based on 44 critics, signifying "generally favorable" reviews. Many critics also included the film among their 10 best of the year.

Specifically, Enough Said was praised for its commitment to realism, both in the way Holofcener's characters converse and in the themes the film addresses. In a review for The New York Times, A. O. Scott claimed that "Line for line, scene for scene, it is one of the best-written American film comedies in recent memory." Kenneth Turan of the Los Angeles Times felt that Enough Said demonstrated "Holofcener's gift for portraying life as it is lived", while David Denby, writing for The New Yorker, wrote that it "approaches novelistic richness". In The New York Times Book Review, Francine Prose praised Holofcener for having written characters "with sufficient depth and wisdom that ... the actors never seem to be movie stars impersonating people. Rather, they disappear into the vulnerable and self-doubting characters they play without a hint of the preening vanity that so often causes cinematic performances to seem forced and shallow." Darren Richman in The Independent called the screenplay "sharp and knowing", praising it for its treatment of "the subtle nuances of a courtship between two people who have been through all this before."

Numerous critics also praised Gandolfini and Louis-Dreyfus's performances in the film. Ann Hornaday of The Washington Post wrote that Gandolfini brought "superb sensitivity and naked vulnerability" to his portrayal of Albert, while Indiewire's Eric Kohn felt that Gandolfini "truly blossoms" in the film. Writing for The Wall Street Journal, Joe Morgenstern similarly described Gandolfini's performance as "marvelous" and "grounded in genial humanity", and found Louis-Dreyfus to be "equally endearing". Ty Burr of The Boston Globe wrote that Gandolfini gave "a performance of immense tenderness and charm", "as endearing as it is heartbreaking", and said of Louis-Dreyfus, "Holofcener brings out a vulnerability you may have forgotten was in this actress." Slate magazine's Dana Stevens, meanwhile, wrote that "There's no one making films right now who writes that kind of dialogue better than Holofcener ... And it's hard to imagine anyone speaking it better than Gandolfini and Julia Louis-Dreyfus."

In a negative review for the San Francisco Chronicle, Mick LaSalle wrote that he found Eva and Albert's romantic pairing implausible and, knowing that Gandolfini died after making the film, found the references to Albert's obesity "awkward and macabre and not at all enjoyable". The Financial Times' Antonia Quirke, meanwhile, described the film as immemorable, "very modest" and "too depressing".

=== Accolades ===
Dreyfus was nominated for the Golden Globes, but to Holofcener's disappointment neither her work on the film nor the film itself were.

Award	Date of ceremony	Category	Nominee(s)	Results	Ref
Alliance of Women Film Journalists	December 19, 2013	Best Original Screenplay	Nicole Holofcener	Nominated	
Alliance of Women Film Journalists	December 19, 2013	Best Woman Director	Nicole Holofcener	Won	
Alliance of Women Film Journalists	December 19, 2013	Best Woman Writer	Nicole Holofcener	Won	
Boston Society of Film Critics	December 8, 2013	Best Screenplay	Nicole Holofcener	Won	
Boston Society of Film Critics	December 8, 2013	Best Supporting Actor	James Gandolfini	Won	
Chicago Film Critics Association	December 16, 2013	Best Supporting Actor	James Gandolfini	Won	
Critics' Choice Movie Award	January 16, 2014	Best Actor in a Comedy	James Gandolfini	Nominated	
Critics' Choice Movie Award	January 16, 2014	Best Actress in a Comedy	Julia Louis-Dreyfus	Nominated	
Critics' Choice Movie Award	January 16, 2014	Best Comedy		Nominated	
Critics' Choice Movie Award	January 16, 2014	Best Supporting Actor	James Gandolfini	Nominated	
Denver Film Critics Society	January 13, 2014	Best Original Screenplay	Nicole Holofcener	Nominated	
Film Independent Spirit Awards	March 1, 2014	Best Screenplay	Nicole Holofcener	Nominated	
Film Independent Spirit Awards	March 1, 2014	Best Supporting Male	James Gandolfini	Nominated	
Golden Globe Award	January 12, 2014	Best Actress – Motion Picture Musical or Comedy	Julia Louis-Dreyfus	Nominated	
Houston Society of Film Critics	December 15, 2013	Best Supporting Actor	James Gandolfini	Nominated	
London Film Critics' Circle	February 2, 2014	Supporting Actor of the Year	James Gandolfini	Nominated	
Phoenix Film Critics Society	December 17, 2013	Best Supporting Actor	James Gandolfini	Nominated	
San Diego Film Critics Society	December 11, 2013	Best Original Screenplay	Nicole Holofcener	Nominated	
San Diego Film Critics Society	December 11, 2013	Best Supporting Actor	James Gandolfini	Nominated	
Satellite Award	February 23, 2014	Best Actress – Motion Picture	Julia Louis-Dreyfus	Nominated	
Satellite Award	February 23, 2014	Best Original Screenplay	Nicole Holofcener	Nominated	
Screen Actors Guild Award	January 18, 2014	Outstanding Performance by a Male Actor in a Supporting Role	James Gandolfini	Nominated	
St. Louis Film Critics Association	December 14, 2013	Best Original Screenplay	Nicole Holofcener	Nominated	
Washington D.C. Area Film Critics Association	December 9, 2013	Best Original Screenplay	Nicole Holofcener	Nominated	
Washington D.C. Area Film Critics Association	December 9, 2013	Best Supporting Actor	James Gandolfini	Nominated	

== In popular culture ==
On the animated series The Great North, Beef Tobin's favorite film is Enough Said and his continual replaying of it leads to his family developing cabin fever while being iced in.
