= The Land of Steady Habits =

- Film poster
- Directed by: Nicole Holofcener
- Written by: Nicole Holofcener
- Based on: The Land of Steady Habits by Ted Thompson
- Produced by: Anthony Bregman; Stefanie Azpiazu; Nicole Holofcener
- Starring: Ben Mendelsohn; Edie Falco; Thomas Mann; Connie Britton
- Cinematography: Alar Kivilo
- Edited by: Robert Frazen
- Music by: Marcelo Zarvos
- Production company: Likely Story
- Distributed by: Netflix
- Release dates: September 12, 2018 (TIFF); September 14, 2018 (United States)
- Running time: 98 minutes
- Country: United States
- Language: English

The Land of Steady Habits is a 2018 American comedy-drama film written, directed and co-produced by Nicole Holofcener and based on the novel of the same name by Ted Thompson.

The film had its world premiere at the Toronto International Film Festival on September 12, 2018, and was released on September 14, 2018, by Netflix.

== Plot ==
Anders Hill has recently divorced Helene, early retired from a job in finance, and is having a difficult time coping. Preston, his adult son, is a recovering drug addict who lives with Helene in the family home. Preston, who graduated from Northwestern University, is now working as a reading specialist with his mother, who got him the job.

Anders still loves his ex, despite sleeping around since the divorce. He shows up at the annual Christmas party she co-hosts with Sophie Ashford, their neighbor. Feeling isolated, he goes outside and joins Sophie and Mitchell's son, Charlie, and some of his friends.

Urged to smoke from a bong, he is surprised to find out that the pot is laced with PCP. Charlie overdoses and is taken to the hospital. Anders tells his therapist that he smoked drugs with Charlie at the party, and is taken aback to hear that his therapist was also in attendance.

While Helene stays in the house, Anders remains its legal owner and is responsible for the mortgage. Six months behind on payments, he realizes that he cannot afford to retire and pay off the house. Anders asks a friend for a loan, who takes him to a strip club where he meets Barbara. They hit it off and share a cab.

Drunk, Anders gives the cab driver his old address, entering the house with his key, upsetting Helene, Preston, and Helene's boyfriend Donny. She is later forced to fire her son after he takes money from a student for a poker game. Preston tells her that Anders cannot pay the mortgage.

Days later, Preston stops by Anders' condo to reveal he has a delivery job, but is homeless because Helene kicked him out. Anders tells him he cannot stay either, and to grow up. Charlie later visits Anders, telling him he has escaped to avoid rehab and asks him to look after his pet turtle. Anders initially threatens to call Charlie's parents, but they instead go to Charlie's "clubhouse". At first, they do drugs while Charlie tells him about his graphic novel on Laika. Anders decides to take him home, but Charlie escapes.

Preston delivers wine to a former classmate, who owns a large home and is expecting his first child. After insulting Preston, he leaves and finds his car broken down. Unable to finish his deliveries, he calls a tow truck that drops him off near the train tracks. Preston contemplates drinking a large bottle of champagne, but instead places it in front of an oncoming train. On the way back to his Jeep, Preston discovers Charlie's corpse behind a tree.

Charlie's death causes Preston to be welcomed back into Helene's home. On Christmas Eve, when the Hills and Ashfords traditionally celebrate dinner together, Preston finds his Dad in a hotel room and convinces him to come for dinner. Over dinner, Anders reveals that he and Charlie took drugs together. This motivates Sophie to tell him that Helene had been cheating on him for two years. Mitchell then attacks Anders, stubbing out his cigar in the middle of Anders' forehead.

A few months later, Helene has sold the house while she and Donny plan their wedding in Hawaii. Preston has decided to attend graduate school in NYC and gets his own apartment. Anders, continuing to date Barbara, is settling into retired life and is looking after Charlie's turtle.

== Cast ==
- Ben Mendelsohn as Anders Harris, Helene's ex-husband, Preston's father, Barbara's love interest.
- Edie Falco as Helene Harris, Anders’ ex-wife
- Thomas Mann as Preston Harris, Helene and Anders' son
- Elizabeth Marvel as Sophie Ashford, Helene's best friend, Mitchell's wife and Charlie's mother
- Michael Gaston as Mitchell Ashford, Sophie's husband and Charlie's father
- Charlie Tahan as Charlie Ashford, Sophie and Mitchell's son
- Bill Camp as Donny O’Connell, Helene's partner
- Josh Pais as Larry Eastwood, a friend of Anders
- Connie Britton as Barbara, Anders’ love-interest
- Natalie Gold as Dana
- Victor Slezak as Wes Thompsan
- Victor Williams as Howard
- Macc H. Plaise as Mr. Baptiste

== Production ==
On August 20, 2014, it was reported that Nicole Holofcener would write and direct an adaptation of Ted Thompson's novel The Land of Steady Habits for Fox Searchlight. In January 2017, Ben Mendelsohn, Edie Falco, and Thomas Mann were set to star in the film, which, it was revealed, was to be financed and distributed by Netflix. In February 2017, Connie Britton joined the cast. In March 2017, Elizabeth Marvel joined the cast.

By March 17, 2017, The Land of Steady Habits had begun filming in Tarrytown.

== Release ==
The Land of Steady Habits had its world premiere at the Toronto International Film Festival on September 12, 2018. It was released exclusively to Netflix on September 14, 2018.

== Reception ==
On review aggregator website Rotten Tomatoes the film holds an approval rating of 83% based on 41 reviews, with an average rating of 6.8/10. The site's critical consensus reads, "With typically sharp work from writer-director Nicole Holofcener and finely layered performances, The Land of Steady Habits is one mid-life crisis worth watching." On Metacritic, the film has a score of 71 out 100, based on 17 critics, indicating "generally favorable reviews".
