= Dakos (surname) =

Dakos is a surname. Notable people with the surname include:

- Kalli Dakos (born 1950), Canadian children's poet
- Noémi Dakos (born 1991), Hungarian handballer
