= Friends with Money =

2006 comedy-drama film

- Theatrical release poster
- Directed by: Nicole Holofcener
- Written by: Nicole Holofcener
- Produced by: Anthony Bregman
- Starring: Jennifer Aniston; Joan Cusack; Catherine Keener; Frances McDormand; Jason Isaacs; Scott Caan; Simon McBurney; Greg Germann
- Cinematography: Terry Stacey
- Edited by: Robert Frazen
- Music by: Rickie Lee Jones; Craig Richey
- Production company: This is that
- Distributed by: Sony Pictures Classics
- Release dates: January 19, 2006 (Sundance); April 7, 2006 (United States)
- Running time: 88 minutes
- Country: United States
- Language: English
- Budget: $6.5 million
- Box office: $18.2 million

Friends with Money is a 2006 American comedy-drama film written and directed by Nicole Holofcener. It stars Jennifer Aniston, Joan Cusack, Catherine Keener, Frances McDormand, Jason Isaacs, Scott Caan, Simon McBurney, and Greg Germann, and follows the personal relationships of a group of friends. It premiered at the 2006 Sundance Film Festival on January 19, 2006 and was released in the United States on April 7, 2006.

== Plot ==
Olivia is a single, always-broke woman who cleans houses in Los Angeles to make ends meet after quitting her job as a teacher. She is in a group of wealthy friends consisting of Franny, a stay-at-home mom with a large trust fund; Christine, a television writer; Jane, a fashion designer; and their husbands.

Still heartbroken over a brief affair with a married man, Olivia agrees to go on a blind date with Franny's trainer, Mike. The date goes poorly, but Mike attempts to make up for it at the last minute and asks to go along with Olivia on a cleaning job. Despite him only offering minimal help, Mike asks for part of Olivia's pay and she reluctantly agrees. They begin dating and Mike continues to come along to work with Olivia and take part of her earnings until she finally finds the self-confidence to call Mike out for his callous behavior and ends the relationship.

Christine and her husband David are constantly at odds with each other, to the point that their friends openly speculate whether they're going to split up. Christine struggles to concentrate on the script she and David are writing as the construction of a new addition to their home is ongoing. She soon discovers that their neighbors' sudden animosity is because the addition will block their views, and attempts to stop construction.

David expresses apathy at the neighbors' anger and Christine confronts him for his lack of sensitivity, including showing a lack of care and affection for her. They decide to separate. Christine puts the unfinished house up for sale and briefly finds herself despondent at David's absence before stubbing her toe and hearing her nanny call out asking if she's okay—something David had always failed to do.

Jane cannot seem to stop herself from insulting acquaintances and becoming angry over minor perceived slights. She also has stopped washing her hair and shows signs of depression. Her husband Aaron, who owns a shampoo company, is fashionable and often assumed to be gay by strangers as well as friends. He befriends another straight, married man named Aaron with similar interests and finally, confronts Jane for her angry fits and refusal to wash her hair after she has an outburst during brunch with the other Aaron and his wife. Jane admits that she's depressed after realizing, "There's no more wondering what it's going to be like."

Franny and her husband Matt are by far the wealthiest couple in the group due to Franny's trust fund. Neither of them work and they live in a large house with full-time help. The other friends frequently comment on their wealth and the apparent lack of tension in their marriage as a result of having no stress about money or work, though Franny does express some discomfort with how much Matt likes to spend.

The friends come together at a charity fundraiser for ALS, where Franny has bought a table. Jane finally washes her hair and smooths things over with her husband. Olivia, who has stopped cleaning houses and started a new job, has begun dating Marty, an awkward and unkempt former client, and finds they have much in common.

After the benefit, Marty reveals to Olivia that he does not work because he has inherited his father's wealth. The next morning, they talk in bed about redecorating Marty's house and connect on a deeper level after admitting they both have some issues that they need to address.

== Cast ==
- Jennifer Aniston as Olivia
- Joan Cusack as Franny
- Catherine Keener as Christine
- Frances McDormand as Jane
- Jason Isaacs as David
- Scott Caan as Mike
- Simon McBurney as Aaron
- Greg Germann as Matt
- Ty Burrell as Other Aaron
- Bob Stephenson as Marty
- Marin Hinkle as Maya
- Timm Sharp as Richard
- Jake Cherry as Wyatt

== Reception ==
=== Box office ===
In its opening weekend in wide release, the film grossed $4.96 million, ranking tenth at the box office. It went on to gross $13.4 million domestically, and a total of $18.2 million worldwide.

=== Critical response ===
The review aggregator Rotten Tomatoes reported that 72% of 154 critics gave the film a positive review, with an average rating of 6.6/10. The site's critical consensus reads, "Strong lead performances, witty dialogue, and wry observations cement Friends With Money as another winning dramedy from writer/director Nicole Holofcener." Metacritic assigned the film a weighted average score of 68 out of 100 based on 38 critics, indicating "generally favorable" reviews.

=== Awards and nominations ===
At the 2006 Independent Spirit Awards, Frances McDormand won the award for Best Supporting Female and Nicole Holofcener was nominated for Best Screenplay. Holofcener also won the Dorothy Arzner Directors Award from the Women in Film Crystal Awards, shared with Joey Lauren Adams for Come Early Morning and Lian Lunson for Leonard Cohen: I'm Your Man. Holofcener received a nomination from the Alliance of Women Film Journalists for Best Comedy by or About Women.

== Home media ==
The film was released on DVD on August 29, 2006, and has grossed $8.1 million in U.S. DVD/home video rentals.

== Soundtrack ==
Friends with Money OST

Soundtrack album by Rickie Lee Jones
- Released: September 18, 2012
- Genre: Score
- Length: 38:32
- Label: Ryko/Rhino

Rickie Lee Jones chronology
Stateside (2004)	Friends with Money OST (2012)	Footy Legends (2006)

All tracks are written by Rickie Lee Jones excepted where noted.

No.	Title	Length
1.	"Circle in the Sand"	3:16
2.	"Free Sample Dance" (by Craig Richey)	1:45
3.	"The Escalator Waltz" (by Craig Richey)	2:01
4.	"Seasons" (by Neil Halstead)	5:23
5.	"You Need Some Sunshine" (by Craig Richey)	2:13
6.	"Hillbilly Song"	3:37
7.	"Finding Resolution" (by Craig Richey)	3:20
8.	"Leaving Home" (by Big Red Button)	2:55
9.	"Circle in the Sand (Instrumental)"	3:20
10.	"World Spins Madly On" (by The Weepies)	2:46
11.	"Allargando and Nostalgic Waltz" (by Craig Richey)	3:45
12.	"Rolling C" (by Craig Richey)	1:30
13.	"Allargando Reprise" (by Craig Richey)	2:41
Total length:		38:32
