= Catherine Keener =

American actress (born 1959)

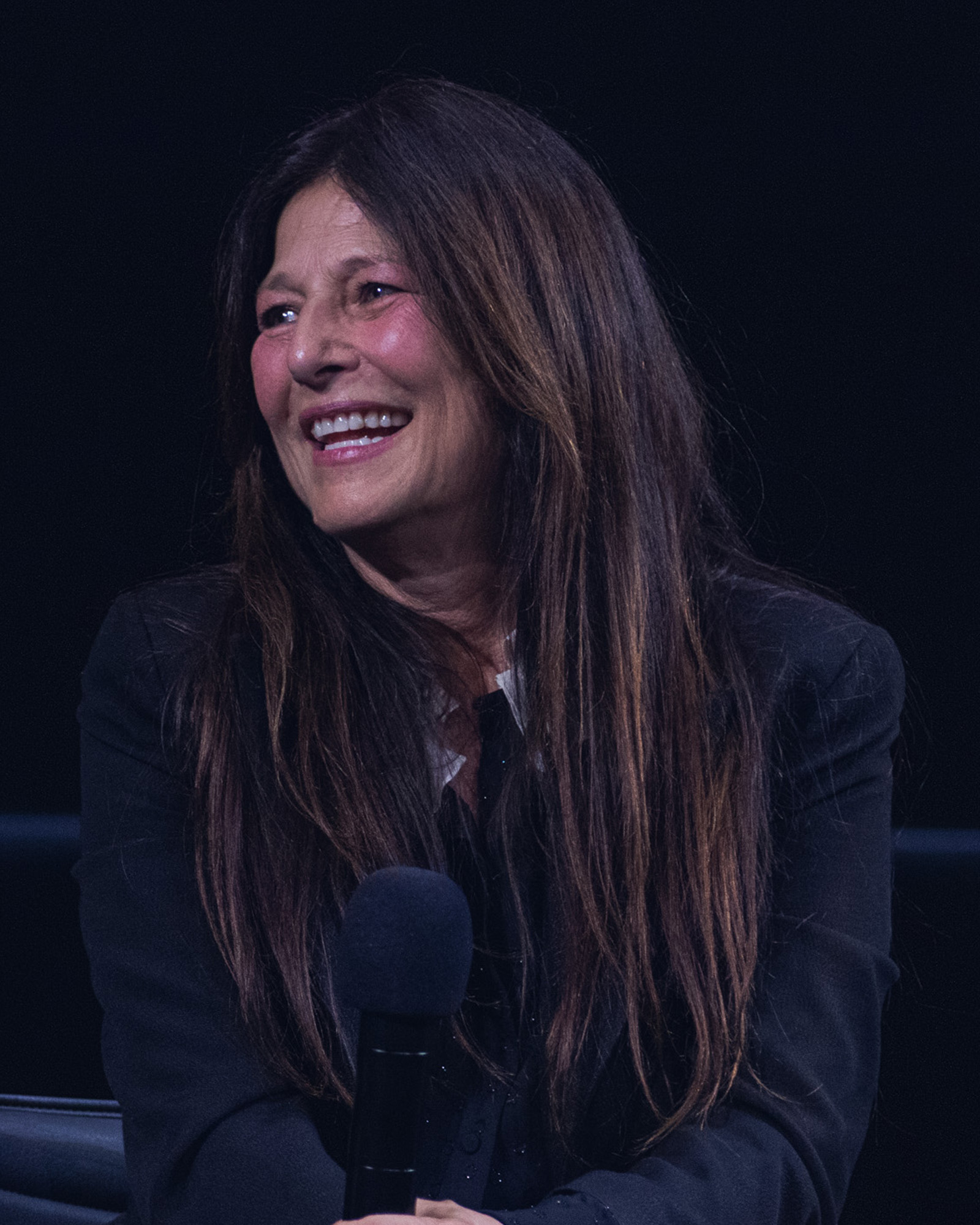
- Keener in 2025
- Born: March 26, 1959 (age 67); Miami, Florida, U.S.
- Education: Wheaton College (BA)
- Occupation: Actress
- Years active: 1986–present
- Spouse: Dermot Mulroney (m. 1990; div. 2007)
- Children: 1
- Awards: Full list

Catherine Keener (born March 26, 1959) is an American actress. Keener is known for her portrayals of disgruntled, melancholic and sympathetic women in independent films, as well as her supporting roles in studio films. Her accolades include nominations for two Academy Awards, a British Academy Film Award, two Golden Globe Awards, and a Primetime Emmy Award.

Keener was nominated twice for the Academy Award for Best Supporting Actress, for Being John Malkovich (1999) and for her portrayal of author Harper Lee in Capote (2005). Her performance as Gertrude Baniszewski in An American Crime (2007) earned her a nomination for the Primetime Emmy Award for Outstanding Lead Actress in a Miniseries or a Movie. She is the muse of director Nicole Holofcener, having appeared in each of Holofcener's first five films. She also appeared in each of director Tom DiCillo's first four films, and three films directed by Spike Jonze.

Keener has starred in the films The 40-Year-Old Virgin (2005), Into the Wild (2007), Synecdoche, New York (2008), Where the Wild Things Are (2009), Percy Jackson & the Olympians: The Lightning Thief (2010), Get Out (2017), and Joker: Folie à Deux (2024), as well as starring voice roles in The Croods (2013), its sequel The Croods: A New Age (2020), and Incredibles 2 (2018). From 2018 to 2020, she starred in the Showtime dramedy series Kidding.

== Early life and education ==
Keener was born to Jim and Evelyn (née Jamiel) Keener. Her father was of Irish descent and her mother is of Lebanese descent. Keener was raised in Hialeah, Florida as a Catholic and attended Catholic schools. She attended Monsignor Edward Pace High School.

Keener attended Wheaton College, in Norton, Massachusetts. She majored in American Studies, also enrolling in a theater course. Her first theatrical production was the Wendy Wasserstein play Uncommon Women and Others, during her junior year at Wheaton. She graduated with her Bachelor of Arts from Wheaton College in 1983.

== Career ==
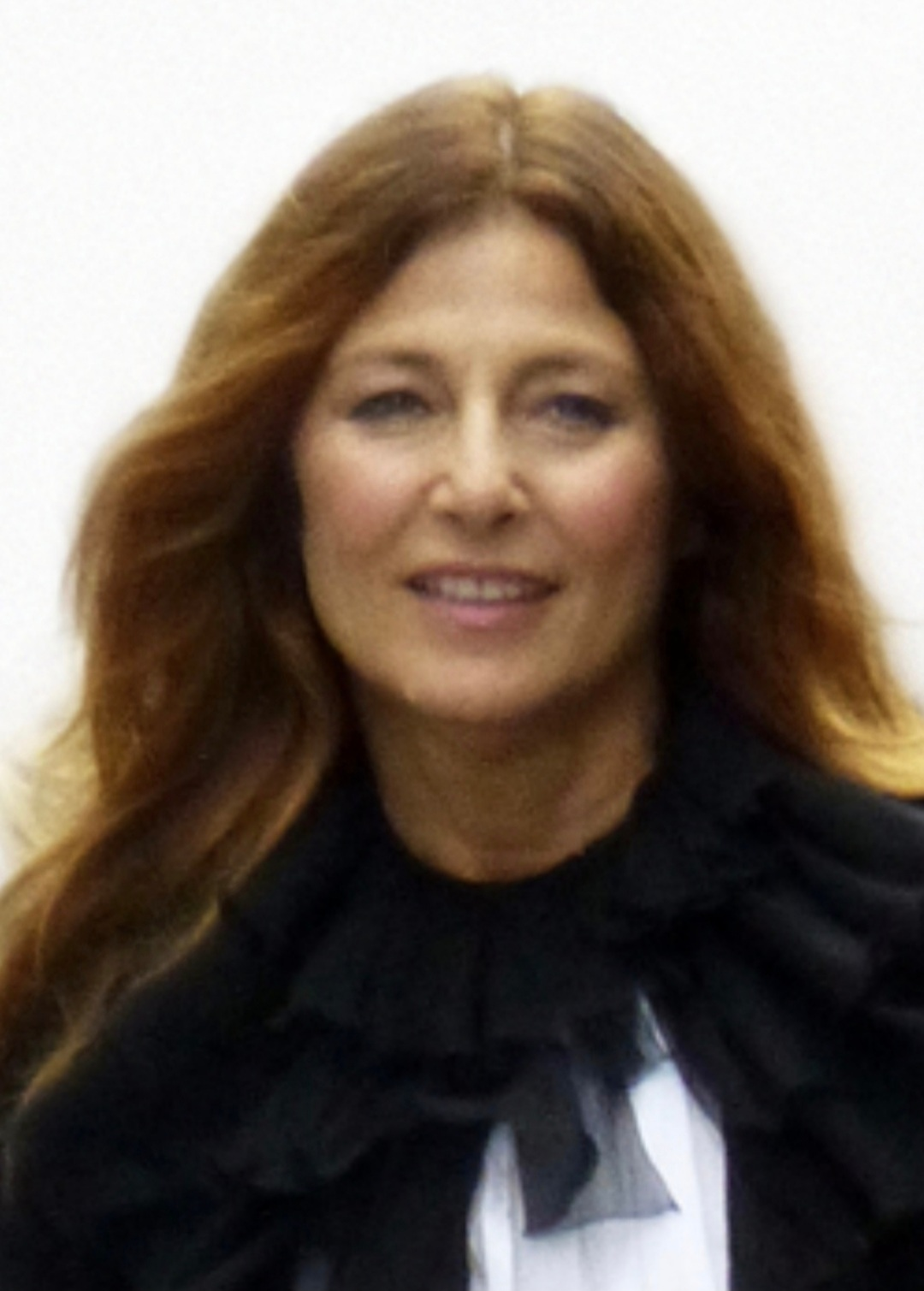
Keener in 2014

Keener had a supporting role as Lt. Cricket Sideris in the television series Ohara. The series ran from January 1987 to May 1988.

Her first film appearance was one line in About Last Night... (1986) and three years later she appeared in Survival Quest.

She guest starred as an artist on an episode of Seinfeld called "The Letter", playing Jerry's girlfriend, an artist who painted a famous portrait of Kramer. Keener then earned her first starring role, in Johnny Suede, with the then-unknown Brad Pitt. Her performance gained critical acclaim and earned her first Independent Spirit Award nomination for Best Female Lead. She went on to work with director Tom Dicillo again, in Living in Oblivion (1995). Two years later, she was once again nominated for an Independent Spirit Award for her performance in Walking and Talking, an independent cult-comedy film directed by Nicole Holofcener.

In 2000, Keener earned her first Oscar nomination for Best Supporting Actress for her role in Being John Malkovich, directed by Spike Jonze. In 2001, she worked with director Nicole Holofcener in Lovely and Amazing, garnering her a third Independent Spirit Award nomination. In 2002, she co-starred with Edward Norton in the off-Broadway revival of Burn This and the film Death to Smoochy. She also took part in the film Full Frontal, and Simone alongside Al Pacino.

In 2005, she starred in the political thriller The Interpreter (as a Secret Service agent partnered with Sean Penn's character) and The Ballad of Jack and Rose with Daniel Day-Lewis and played the love interest of Steve Carell in Judd Apatow's The 40-Year-Old Virgin. Keener's performance as writer Harper Lee in Capote (also 2005) earned her several awards and nominations, including her second Oscar nomination for Best Supporting Actress. In 2006, she starred in the film Friends with Money, directed by Nicole Holofcener.

In 2007, Keener played Jan Burres in Sean Penn's critically acclaimed film Into the Wild, based on Jon Krakauer's best-selling book of the same name. In 2008, her film An American Crime, the true story of Gertrude Baniszewski, a middle-aged mother who tortured and murdered Sylvia Likens in her Indiana home, was aired on Showtime. Keener played Baniszewski and her portrayal earned her an Emmy nomination in the Best Actress in a TV Mini-Series or Movie category. In 2008, Keener portrayed Philip Seymour Hoffman's wife Adele in Charlie Kaufman's directorial debut, Synecdoche, New York. She and Hoffman again played husband and wife in the 2012 film A Late Quartet. Keener played the title character's mother in the 2010 film Percy Jackson & the Olympians: The Lightning Thief, based on the series of books by Rick Riordan.

Keener starred in the six-episode HBO miniseries Show Me a Hero, based on the 1999 nonfiction book of the same name by Lisa Belkin. It aired in August 2015. In 2016, Keener starred in the independent film Unless.

In 2017, Keener starred as Missy Armitage in the racially themed horror film Get Out, which was a critical and commercial success.

Keener starred in the 2021 Netflix horror drama miniseries Brand New Cherry Flavor.

In 2024, Keener appeared in Joker: Folie à Deux, the sequel to the 2019 film Joker.

== Acting style and reception ==
Throughout her career, Keener has developed a reputation for succeeding in complex roles, often portraying desolate, bittersweet women "who come across as empty or unfulfilled in their relationships or their creative endeavors", effortlessly earning sympathy from audiences in both protagonist and antagonist roles. Director Rebecca Miller said that Keener is "very good at playing disgruntled", a designation about which Keener explained, "Anger is not a bad thing"; she finds comfort in playing roles of this nature because "It doesn't go hand in hand with the mode of behaviour that's ladylike or proper or dignified." Nate Williams of ComingSoon.net deemed Keener "one of the most interesting performers in the game" as of 2019 due to her willingness "to embrace different roles", describing her as "A dramatic actor with no problem playing strange characters".

Keener gravitates towards roles in independent films, and opts for smaller character roles on rare occasions when she agrees to appear in larger studio ventures, which Entertainment Weekly critic Missy Schwartz believes "she inhabits more comfortably than flashier ones." Amanda McCorquodale, contributing to the Miami New Times, wrote that Keener regularly plays smart, neurotic women in independent films, likening her body of work to Woody Allen heroines. Rotten Tomatoes crowned Keener "one of the queens of 1990s American independent cinema", while The Independent called her "A darling of the independent film world". Despite commending her diverse yet carefully cultivated roles, The Independent observed that most of Keener's studio roles have "barely registered" among critics and audiences. Williams believes that Keener's skillset and versatility have allowed her to work with some of the industry's best filmmakers. Schwartz wrote that directors such as Neil LaBute (Your Friends & Neighbors, 1998) and Steven Soderbergh (Full Frontal, 2002) have consistently "put her unusual beauty and trademark dry wit to good use."

Keener seldom gives interviews, believing that overexposure "becomes a dirty business". The actress is known for being notoriously press-shy, and refuses to refer to herself as "famous" despite her success in the film industry. In 2010, Inside Jersey contributor Stephen Whitty observed that, throughout a decade of interviewing the actress, Keener had always been open to commenting about her collaborators, both directors and co-stars, but often refused to be interviewed about herself, considering her a shy person who values her privacy. In 2014, the Montreal Gazette journalist T'Cha Dunlevy selected Keener as his most memorable interview of the year, during which he admitted to mostly remembering laughing. Dunlevy described the actress as "a consummate pro who has brought charisma and soul to projects ranging from" goofball comedies to blockbuster films. Keener has continued to enjoy a reputation "as a both charming and well respected actress".

== Personal life ==
Keener met her future husband, actor Dermot Mulroney, in 1987 while working on Survival Quest, after Mulroney became stuck while attempting to scale a cliff. They married in 1990. They have a son, Clyde, born in 1999, who is a singer. Mulroney filed for divorce in June 2007, citing irreconcilable differences and the divorce became final on December 19, 2007.

== Filmography ==
=== Film ===
Year	Title	Role	Notes
1986	About Last Night...	Cocktail Waitress	
1989	Survival Quest	Cheryl	
1990	Catchfire	Trucker's girl	
1991	Switch	Steve's Secretary	
1991	Johnny Suede	Yvonne	
1991	Thelma & Louise	Hal's wife	Scenes cut
1992	The Gun in Betty Lou's Handbag	Suzanne	
1993	The Cemetery Club	Gail Moskowitz	
1995	Living in Oblivion	Nicole Springer	
1996	Walking and Talking	Amelia	
1996	The Destiny of Marty Fine	Lena	
1996	Boys	Jilly	
1996	Box of Moonlight	Floatie Dupre	
1997	The Real Blonde	Mary	
1998	Out of Sight	Adele Delisi	
1998	Your Friends & Neighbors	Terri	
1999	8mm	Amy Welles	
1999	Simpatico	Cecilia	
1999	Being John Malkovich	Maxine Lund	
2001	Lovely & Amazing	Michelle Marks	
2002	Adaptation	Herself	Cameo
2002	Full Frontal	Lee	
2002	Death to Smoochy	Nora Wells	
2002	Simone	Elaine Christian	
2005	The Ballad of Jack and Rose	Kathleen	
2005	The Interpreter	Dot Woods	
2005	The 40-Year-Old Virgin	Trish Piedmont	
2005	Capote	Nelle Harper Lee	
2006	Friends with Money	Christine	
2007	An American Crime	Gertrude Baniszewski	
2007	Into the Wild	Jan Burres	
2008	Hamlet 2	Brie Marschz	
2008	What Just Happened	Lou Tarnow	
2008	Synecdoche, New York	Adele Lack	
2008	Genova	Barbara	
2009	The Soloist	Mary Weston	
2009	Where the Wild Things Are	Connie	Also associate producer
2010	Please Give	Kate	
2010	Cyrus	Jamie	
2010	Percy Jackson & the Olympians: The Lightning Thief	Sally Jackson	
2010	Trust	Lynn Cameron	
2011	The Oranges	Paige Walling	
2011	Peace, Love & Misunderstanding	Diane	
2011	Maladies	Catherine	
2012	A Late Quartet	Juliette Gelbart	
2013	The Croods	Ugga Crood	Voice
2013	Enough Said	Marianne	
2013	Captain Phillips	Andrea Phillips	
2013	Jackass Presents: Bad Grandpa	Ellie Zisman	
2014	Jackass Presents: Bad Grandpa.5	Ellie Zisman	Direct to video
2014	War Story	Lee	Also producer
2014	Begin Again	Miriam Hart	
2014	Elephant Song	Susan Peterson	
2015	Accidental Love	Rep. Pam Hendrickson	
2016	Unless	Reta Winters	
2017	Get Out	Missy Armitage	
2017	Little Pink House	Susette Kelo	
2017	We Don't Belong Here	Nancy Green	
2017	November Criminals	Fiona Zeleny	
2018	Nostalgia	Donna Beam	
2018	Incredibles 2	Evelyn Deavor / Screenslaver	Voice
2018	Sicario: Day of the Soldado	Cynthia Foards	
2020	The Croods: A New Age	Ugga Crood	Voice
2021	No Future	Claire	
2022	The Adam Project	Maya Sorian	
2022	Polar Bear	Narrator	Voice
2024	Joker: Folie à Deux	Maryanne Stewart	
2026	Love of Your Life	Ruth	

Key
†	Denotes films that have not yet been released

=== Television ===
Year	Title	Role	Notes
1986	L.A. Law	Waitress	Episode: "The House of the Rising Flan"
1987	Ohara	Lt. Cricket Sideris	11 episodes
1988–1989	Knightwatch	Rebecca	2 episodes
1989	CBS Summer Playhouse	Jan Engle	Episode: "Curse of the Corn People"
1992	Seinfeld	Nina West	Episode: "The Letter"
1996	Heroine of Hell	Magda	Television film
1996	If These Walls Could Talk	Becky Donnelly	Television film; segment: "1952"
2014	How and Why	Alice	Pilot
2015	Show Me a Hero	Mary Dorman	5 episodes
2018–2020	Kidding	Deirdre "Didi" Perera	20 episodes
2018	Forever	Kase	5 episodes
2019	Modern Love	Julie	2 episodes
2021	Brand New Cherry Flavor	Boro	8 episodes
2023	Lucky Hank	Catherine Keener	Episode: "The Chopping Block"

=== Video games ===
Year	Title	Role	Notes
2018	Lego The Incredibles	Evelyn Deavor	

=== Podcast ===
Year	Title	Role	Notes
2016–2017	Homecoming	Heidi Bergman	

== Awards and nominations ==
Year	Title	Award
1991	Johnny Suede	Nominated—Independent Spirit Award for Best Female Lead
1995	Walking and Talking	Nominated—Independent Spirit Award for Best Female Lead
1999	Being John Malkovich	Florida Film Critics Circle Award for Best Supporting Actress; Kansas City Film Critics Circle Award for Best Supporting Actress; New York Film Critics Circle Award for Best Supporting Actress; Online Film Critics Society Award for Best Supporting Actress; Satellite Award for Best Supporting Actress – Motion Picture; Southeastern Film Critics Association Award for Best Supporting Actress; Nominated—Academy Award for Best Supporting Actress; Nominated—Chicago Film Critics Association Award for Best Supporting Actress; Nominated—Golden Globe Award for Best Supporting Actress – Motion Picture; Nominated—Las Vegas Film Critics Society Award for Best Supporting Actress; Nominated—Saturn Award for Best Actress; Nominated—Screen Actors Guild Award for Outstanding Performance by a Female Actor in a Supporting Role; Nominated—Screen Actors Guild Award for Outstanding Performance by a Cast in a Motion Picture
2001	Lovely & Amazing	Nominated—Independent Spirit Award for Best Female Lead; Nominated—Satellite Award for Best Actress – Motion Picture Musical or Comedy
2005	The Ballad of Jack and Rose	Boston Society of Film Critics Award for Best Supporting Actress; Los Angeles Film Critics Association Award for Best Supporting Actress
2005	The Interpreter	Los Angeles Film Critics Association Award for Best Supporting Actress
2005	The 40-Year-Old Virgin	Boston Society of Film Critics Award for Best Supporting Actress; Los Angeles Film Critics Association Award for Best Supporting Actress
2005	Capote	Boston Society of Film Critics Award for Best Supporting Actress; Dallas-Fort Worth Film Critics Association Award for Best Supporting Actress; Los Angeles Film Critics Association Award for Best Supporting Actress; Toronto Film Critics Association Award for Best Supporting Actress; Nominated—Academy Award for Best Supporting Actress; Nominated—BAFTA Award for Best Actress in a Supporting Role; Nominated—Broadcast Film Critics Association Award for Best Supporting Actress; Nominated—Chicago Film Critics Association Award for Best Supporting Actress; Nominated—Online Film Critics Society Award for Best Supporting Actress; Nominated—Screen Actors Guild Award for Outstanding Performance by a Female Actor in a Supporting Role; Nominated—Screen Actors Guild Award for Outstanding Performance by a Cast in a Motion Picture; Nominated—Washington DC Area Film Critics Association Award for Best Supporting Actress
2007	An American Crime	Nominated—Golden Globe Award for Best Actress - Miniseries or Television Film; Nominated—Primetime Emmy Award for Outstanding Lead Actress in a Miniseries or a Movie
2007	Into the Wild	Nominated—Broadcast Film Critics Association Award for Best Supporting Actress; Nominated—Houston Film Critics Society Award for Best Supporting Actress; Nominated—Screen Actors Guild Award for Outstanding Performance by a Female Actor in a Supporting Role; Nominated—Screen Actors Guild Award for Outstanding Performance by a Cast in a Motion Picture
2008	Synecdoche, New York	Gotham Independent Film Award for Best Ensemble Cast; Independent Spirit Robert Altman Award
2009	Where the Wild Things Are	Nominated—Saturn Award for Best Actress
2010	Please Give	Nominated—Comedy Film Award for Best Leading Actress; Nominated—Gotham Independent Film Award for Best Ensemble Cast; Nominated—Satellite Award for Best Actress – Motion Picture Musical or Comedy
2017	Get Out	Nominated—Screen Actors Guild Award for Outstanding Performance by a Cast in a Motion Picture

== See also ==
- List of people from Miami
