= The Good Samaritan (Seinfeld) =

- Seinfeld episode
- Episode no.: Season 3 Episode 20
- Directed by: Jason Alexander
- Written by: Peter Mehlman
- Production code: 319
- Original air date: March 4, 1992

Guest appearances
- Joseph Malone as Michael; Ann Talman as Robin; Melinda McGraw as Angela; Helen Slater (uncredited) as Becky Gelke

Episode chronology
← Previous "The Limo"	Next → "The Letter"
- Seinfeld season 3

"The Good Samaritan" is the 37th episode of the sitcom Seinfeld. It is the 20th episode of the third season, and first aired on NBC on March 4, 1992. This is the only episode of Seinfeld to be directed by one of the show's stars, Jason Alexander, who played George Costanza.

== Plot ==
Over car phone with Elaine, Jerry witnesses a hit-and-run on a parked car, and Elaine dares him to confront the driver. After the call gets cut off. Jerry sees that the driver, Angela (Melinda McGraw), is an attractive woman, and goes out with her instead. Angela shamelessly ignores Jerry's nudges to redeem herself.

George is impressed by Jerry's story, and they rationalize dating a hit-and-run driver. To save face to Elaine, Jerry boasts that he tailed the driver to Queens and bested "him" in a fight, likewise impressing her. Jerry backs out of dinner with Elaine and her married friend, Robin. Needing company to make up for feelings of inferiority, Elaine takes George and pays for him.

At dinner with Robin (Ann Talman) and her husband, Michael (Joseph Malone), Elaine makes up an exotic romance with bullfighter "Eduardo Carochio" to one-up them. Robin sneezes, but no one says "God bless you" until George fills the silence. This turns out to be a sore spot for the couple, and marital tensions flare up as Michael takes umbrage. Afterwards, George and Jerry argue over "right of first refusal" for a response to sneezing, and Jerry proposes replacing "God bless you" with "You're so good looking".

Kramer repeatedly goes into seizures whenever Entertainment Tonight comes on TV, falling over and hitting his head. Elaine deduces that the trigger is host Mary Hart's voice, even as Kramer questions if it could be John Tesh instead.

Robin calls George to apologize, and to meet for an illicit tryst. After sex, she confides her discontent that Michael has never said "God bless you" in three years. However, Michael sees through Robin's cover story when Elaine fails to corroborate it, and he vows grievous violence upon George.

Jerry learns from Kramer that the hit-and-run victim was a neighborhood woman he has long pined after. Jerry changes his tune and righteously condemns Angela, but is impotent to bring her to justice when she intimidates him into silence. Elaine sees, and needles him for his false boasts. George and Elaine throw blame at each other for the discovered affair, and Jerry turns the tables on Elaine over her invented bullfighter.

Jerry recompenses Angela's victim, Becky (an uncredited Helen Slater). However, he incriminates himself by covering for the perpetrator, and Becky shoots down his overtures. Jerry's novel response to Becky's sneeze fails to win her over.

Fearing for his safety, George skips town with Jerry on tour. Kramer meets Becky for a date, only to greet her with another seizure when Entertainment Tonight comes on.

== Production ==
The cast and crew had hoped the saying "You're so good looking" would catch on with fans just as "These pretzels are making me thirsty" did, but it proved to be a comedic flop.

The subplot concerning Kramer having seizures every time he hears Mary Hart's voice is based on an actual case reported in the New England Journal of Medicine.
