= The Letter (Seinfeld) =

- Seinfeld episode
- Episode no.: Season 3 Episode 21
- Directed by: Tom Cherones
- Written by: Larry David
- Production code: 320
- Original air date: March 25, 1992

Guest appearance
- Catherine Keener as Nina

Episode chronology
← Previous "The Good Samaritan"	Next → "The Parking Space"
- Seinfeld season 3

"The Letter" is the 38th episode of the sitcom Seinfeld. The episode was the 21st of the third season. It aired on NBC on March 25, 1992.

== Plot ==
Jerry is dating Nina (Catherine Keener), an artist. Nina has Kramer pose for a portrait, while using this chance to pry into Jerry's closeness with Elaine. Jerry, knowing about Nina's possessiveness, does not expect their relationship to last. Still, he brings George to her studio, where, despite not understanding art, George succumbs to pressure to buy a painting, without naming a price.

Nina offers the group weekend box seat tickets at Yankee Stadium from her father, the team accountant. George and Kramer take Elaine along; Elaine makes up a family emergency to her boss, Mr. Lippman, to get out of attending a bris ceremony. Nina's father, Leonard, objects to Elaine wearing a Baltimore Orioles baseball cap in the owner's box, and calls a guard when she refuses to remove it. In the scuffle, Kramer is hit in the head by a baseball. A photo of the incident makes the Sunday paper, threatening to out Elaine to Lippman, but she fails to steal his copy of the incriminating sports section before his flight.

A socialite couple (Justine Johnston and Elliott Reid) is captivated by Kramer's portrait, one out of endearment and the other out of disgust. Meanwhile, Jerry breaks up with Nina, and unthinkingly couriers George's painting on his way out. George refuses to pay $500 for the abstract painting if not for Jerry's sake. However, Nina leaves a letter for Jerry, pledging her unfaltering love for him in passionate prose on red stationery. Kramer is so moved that he urges Jerry to win her back, while blowing his nose over the painting and cleaning it off with his used handkerchief.

Back together with Jerry, Nina remains jealous of Elaine. George tries to return his painting, but Nina lets him have it. While fighting over the remote, George, Elaine, and Jerry catch the Neil Simon film Chapter Two on TV, revealing that Nina's letter was word-for-word from the movie script. Jerry dumps Nina again, and George tries to offload his painting on Jerry for $10.

Lippman is none the wiser to Elaine being at the stadium, even after Leonard—who is also his accountant—tells him the story, and even knowing that Elaine wears an Orioles cap. Having received box seat tickets, Lippman insists that Elaine come along after missing the bris, and has Elaine wear her cap to prank Leonard. Later, Jerry and George watch the game on TV as Phil Rizzuto comments on two guards escorting Elaine out.

The socialites buy Kramer's portrait for $5000, then treat Kramer himself to dinner at their mansion in exchange for his life story.

== Popularity ==
Both the oil painting of Kramer and the words the elderly couple use to describe it became popular among Seinfeld fans. Rob Thomas of the Wisconsin State Journal included the line "he is a loathsome, offensive brute, yet I can't look away" in his top 20 of Seinfeld lines.
