= Alice Drummond =

American actress (1928–2016)

- Drummond in Ghostbusters (1984)
- Born: Alice Elizabeth Ruyter; May 21, 1928; Pawtucket, Rhode Island, U.S.
- Died: November 30, 2016 (aged 88); New York City, New York, U.S.
- Education: Pembroke College
- Occupation: Actress
- Years active: 1967–2011
- Spouse: Paul Drummond (m. 1951; div. 1976)

Alice Elizabeth Drummond (née Ruyter; May 21, 1928 – November 30, 2016) was an American actress. A veteran Off-Broadway performer, she was nominated in 1970 for the Tony Award for Best Featured Actress in a Play for her performance as Mrs. Lee in The Chinese by Murray Schisgal. She may be best known as Alice, the librarian, in the opening scenes of the 1984 horror-comedy Ghostbusters.

== Early life ==
Alice Elizabeth Ruyter was born in Pawtucket, Rhode Island in 1928, the daughter of Sarah Irene (née Alker), a secretary, and Arthur Ruyter, an auto mechanic. She graduated from Pembroke College (the women's college of Brown University) in 1950.

== Career ==
Drummond played Nurse Jackson on the TV series Dark Shadows in 1967 and was a regular on the CBS soap opera, Where the Heart Is, on which she originated the role of Loretta Jardin, which she played until the series ended in 1973. She also appeared in a short-term role on another CBS soap opera, As the World Turns. She appeared in guest roles on television series including Kate & Allie, Law & Order, Boston Legal and Yes, Dear.

One of Drummond's notable movie roles is a librarian haunted and frightened by a poltergeist at the beginning of the feature film Ghostbusters. She portrayed a catatonic patient named Lucy in 1990's Awakenings. She also played a senior citizen in the movie Furry Vengeance. Other notable appearances include Ace Ventura: Pet Detective, To Wong Foo, Thanks for Everything, Julie Newmar and Pieces of April.

== Personal life and death ==
Alice Ruyter married Paul Drummond in 1951. They resided in Manhattan, New York City, New York. They separated in 1975 and divorced in 1976.

She died on November 30, 2016, from complications of a fall at her home in The Bronx, New York City, at age 88.

== Filmography ==
=== Film ===
Year	Title	Role	Notes
1970	Where's Poppa?	Woman in Elevator	
1974	Man on a Swing	Mrs. Dawson	
1977	Thieves	Mrs. Ramsey	
1978	King of the Gypsies	Zharko's Nurse	
1980	Hide in Plain Sight	Mrs. Novack	
1981	Eyewitness	Mrs. Eunice Deever	
1982	The Best Little Whorehouse in Texas	Governor's Secretary	
1984	Ghostbusters	Librarian	
1988	The House on Carroll Street	Woman at Hearing	
1988	The Suicide Club		
1988	Funny Farm	Mrs. Ethel Dinges	
1988	Running on Empty	Mrs. Powell	
1989	Animal Behavior	Site Committee #1	
1990	Tales from the Darkside: The Movie	Carolyn	Segment: "Cat From Hell"
1990	Awakenings	Lucy	
1993	Money for Nothing	Mrs. Breen	
1994	Ace Ventura: Pet Detective	Mrs. Finkle	
1994	Nobody's Fool	Hattie	
1994	I.Q.	Dinner Guest	
1995	Jeffrey	Grandma Rose	
1995	To Wong Foo Thanks for Everything, Julie Newmar	Clara	
1996	Walking and Talking	Betsy	
1996	Just in Time	Edith	Short film
1997	Commandments	Mrs. Mann	
1997	'Til There Was You	Harriet	
1997	Office Killer	Carlotta Douglas	
1997	In & Out	Aunt Susan	
1999	Just the Ticket	Lady with Cash	
1999	The Love Letter	Postal Clerk	
1999	I'll Take You There	Stella	
1999	Advice from a Caterpillar	Diner Grandmother	
2000	Joe Gould's Secret	Helen	
2001	The Rising Place	Aunt Millie	
2003	Pieces of April	Grandma Dottie	
2004	House of D	Mrs. Brevoort	
2005	The Honeymooners	Miss Benvenuti	
2008	Chronic Town	Elizabeth	
2008	Synecdoche, New York	Actress Playing Frances	
2008	Doubt	Sister Veronica	
2009	Motherhood	Edith	
2009	After.Life	Mrs. Hutton	
2010	Furry Vengeance	Mrs. Martin	
2011	Open House	Ruthie	Short film
2019	Cleanin' Up the Town: Remembering Ghostbusters	Herself	Documentary film; posthumous release

=== Television ===
Year	Title	Role	Notes
1967	Dark Shadows	Nurse Jackson	5 episodes
1970	New York Television Theatre		Episode: "The Sandbox"
1971-1973	Where the Heart Is	Loretta Jardin	3 episodes
1972	Particular Men	Mrs. Ewing	TV movie
1977	The Best of Families	Mabel Baldwin	TV miniseries
1977	Great Performances	Mrs. Varney	Episode: "Secret Service"
1978	Ryan's Hope	Susie Simpson	Episodes: "1.714", "1.719", "1.720"
1979	Sanctuary of Fear	Grace Barringer	TV movie
1981	Park Place	Frances Heine	4 episodes
1981	Love, Sidney	Tina	Episode: "Hello, Yetta"
1984	American Playhouse	Hiss' Secretary	Episode: "Concealed Enemies, Part I: Suspicion"
1984	Night Court	Mavis Tuttle	Episode: "Harry and the Rock Star"
1984	Great Performances	Gay Wellington	Episode: "You Can't Take It with You"
1986	The Equalizer	Kind Woman	Episode: "Nocturne"
1987	Night Court	Alice Beeker	Episode: "Murder"
1988	Kate & Allie	Mrs. Rinde	Episode: "The Band Singer"
1989	Nikki and Alexander	Mrs. Klein	TV pilot
1989	The Days and Nights of Molly Dodd	Juror	Episode: "Here's a Major Organ Interlude"
1989	Money, Power, Murder.	Helen	TV movie
1990-1991	Lenny	Mary Callahan	16 episodes
1992	Frannie's Turn	Rosa Escobar	6 episodes
1993	Daybreak	Anna	TV movie
1994	Grace Under Fire	Nana Lil	Episode: "With This Ring"
1994	Friends	Althea	Episode: "The One Where Nana Dies Twice"
1994	Law & Order	Zelda	Episode: "Mayhem"
1995	New York News		Episode: "Thin Line"
1996	Cosby	Mrs. Bagley	Episode: "Neighborhood Watch"
1998	Trinity	Mrs. Bingham	Episode: "Pilot"
1999	Earthly Possessions	Old Woman In Jalopy	TV movie
2000	Spin City	Sondra Spencer	Episode: "Suffragette City"
2002	Ed	Mrs. Shroeder	Episode: "Memory Lane"
2004	The Jury	Hannah Francis	Episode: "The Honeymoon Suite"
2005	Boston Legal	Lydia Tuffalo	Episode: "The Ass Fat Jungle"
2007	Oprah Winfrey Presents: Mitch Albom's For One More Day	Rose	TV movie
