= Kalli Dakos =

Canadian children's poet and teacher

Kalli Dakos (born June 16, 1950) is a Canadian children's poet and teacher, best known for her collection of poetry about elementary school life. Born in Ottawa, Ontario, she has published more than twenty books of poetry for children.

== Early life and education ==
Dakos was born on June 16, 1950, in Ottawa, Canada. She studied at the Queen's University, the University of Nevada, the University of Alberta, and Syracuse University. She earned a Bachelor of Arts and Bachelor of Education degrees from Queen's University.

== Career ==
Dakos worked as an elementary school teacher and reading specialist early in her career, an experience that has been identified as a central influence on her poetry. Dakos's debut collection, If You're Not Here, Please Raise Your Hand: Poems About School, was published in 1990. Her poetry is described by the Poetry Foundation as "uniquely attuned to the lives of elementary school students," and she has been praised for her "sensitive evocations of the feelings of elementary-aged students" as well as for the "frequent humor and word play" of her poems. Many of her books have been named International Literacy Association (ILA)–Children's Book Council (CBC) Children's Choice Selections.

== Awards and recognition ==
They Only See the Outside (2021) was named to the 2022 Notable Poetry Books and Verse Novels list by the National Council of Teachers of English (NCTE) Excellence in Poetry for Children Award Committee.

== Bibliography ==
- 1990: If You're Not Here, Please Raise Your Hand: Poems About School
- 1993: Don't Read This Book, Whatever You Do! More Poems About School
- 1995: Mrs. Cole on an Onion Roll
- 1996: The Goof Who Invented Homework and Other School Poems
- 1997: Get Out of the Alphabet Number 2: Wacky Wednesday Puzzle Poems
- 1999: The Bug in Teacher's Coffee and Other School Poems
- 2000: The Greatest Magic: Poems for Teachers
- 2003: Put Your Eyes Up Here and Other School Poems
- 2004: Our Principal Promised to Kiss a Pig
- 2010: I Heard You Twice the First Time: Poems for Tired and Bewildered Teachers
- 2011: A Funeral in The Bathroom
- 2017: Why Am I Blue?
- 2019: Get Me Out Of This Book: Rules and Tools for Being Brave
- 2019: Recess in the Dark: Poems from the Far North
- 2021: They Only See the Outside
- 2021: My Story Friend
- 2021: Our Farm in the City
- 2023: Happy Birthday, Belly Button!
- 2023: Buttons
- 2023: My Lunchbox is Hopping and Other School Poems
