= Nicole Holofcener =

American director and screenwriter

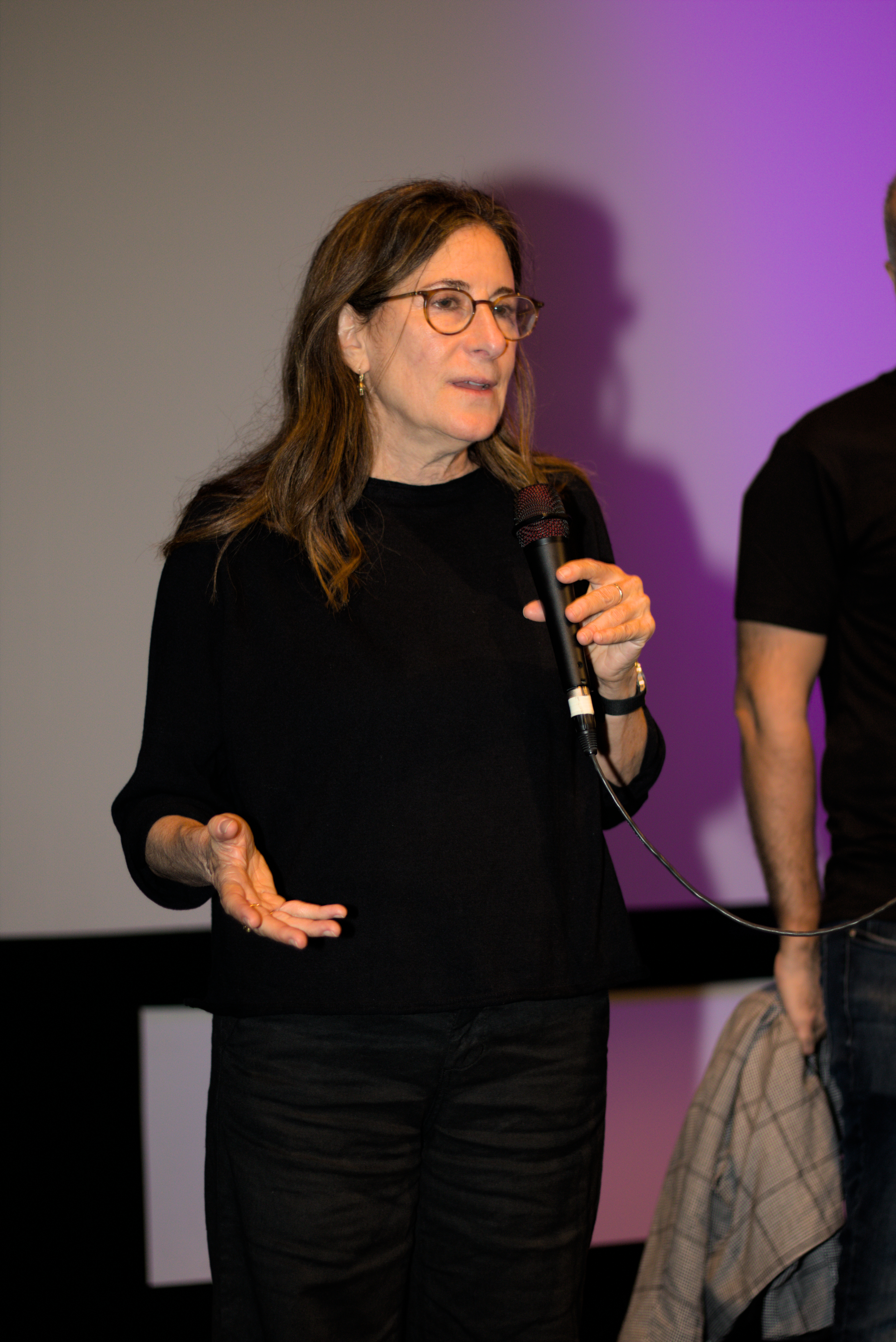
- Holofcener in July 2024
- Born: March 22, 1960 (age 66); New York City, U.S.
- Education: New York University (BFA); Columbia University (MFA)
- Occupations: Film director; screenwriter
- Years active: 1982–present
- Spouse: Benjamin Allanoff (m. 1993; div. 2002)
- Children: 2
- Parents: Lawrence Holofcener (father); Carol Holofcener (mother)
- Relatives: Charles H. Joffe (stepfather)

Nicole Holofcener (/ˈhɒləfsɛnər/ HALL-əf-senn-ər; born March 22, 1960) is an American film and television director and screenwriter. She has directed seven feature films, including Walking and Talking, Friends with Money and Enough Said, as well as various television series. Along with Jeff Whitty, Holofcener received a 2019 Academy Award nomination for Adapted Screenplay, a BAFTA nomination for Best Adapted Screenplay, and won the Writers Guild of America Award for Best Adapted Screenplay for the film Can You Ever Forgive Me? (2018).

== Early life and education ==
Holofcener was born to a culturally-Jewish family in New York City, the younger of two daughters of artist Lawrence Holofcener and set decorator Carol Joffe (née Shapiro). Her elder sister is Suzanne Holofcener. Nicole's parents divorced when she was a year old. When she was eight, her mother married film producer Charles H. Joffe, who moved the family to Hollywood.

Since her stepfather produced Woody Allen's films, Holofcener spent enough time on Allen's sets to be an extra in Take the Money and Run and Sleeper. Joffe was responsible for Holofcener's first "real" job in the movie industry: a production assistant on Woody Allen's A Midsummer Night's Sex Comedy in 1982. She moved up to apprentice editor for Hannah and Her Sisters (1986).

Holofcener's first experiences with film as a child left her either frightened or sad; she recalled her fright at Jerry Lewis's The Nutty Professor. Holofcener originally wanted to become an artist like her father, but felt she wasn't as talented as others in her classes at Sonoma State University. From there, she gravitated into taking film courses. She studied film at the Tisch School of the Arts at New York University and at Columbia University, and made two shorts titled Angry, which received critical praise at the Sundance Film Festival, and It's Richard I Love. While at Columbia, she was taught by Martin Scorsese.

After viewing one of her NYU films, her stepfather wondered aloud if she should make a career change. Disappointed, she became a clerk at a video store for a while, then entered Columbia's graduate film program. At the time of his death in 2008, Joffe had become one of the most ardent fans of his stepdaughter's work.

== Career ==
Holofcener made her feature film writing and directing debut in 1996 with Walking and Talking, which starred Catherine Keener, Anne Heche, Todd Field, Liev Schreiber, and Kevin Corrigan. The film was critically acclaimed. Her understanding of modern, professional women made her an ideal choice to direct female-centric television shows like Sex and the City, Leap of Faith and Gilmore Girls. Holofcener also worked on an episode of the U.S. adaptation of Cold Feet.

She followed in 2001 with her second feature, Lovely and Amazing. Featuring performances by Catherine Keener, Brenda Blethyn, Emily Mortimer and newcomer Raven Goodwin, the film was not only critically acclaimed but did well at the box office.

After directing two episodes of the series Six Feet Under, Holofcener began work on her third film, Friends with Money, which featured Jennifer Aniston, Joan Cusack, Frances McDormand, and Catherine Keener. The film opened the 2006 Sundance Film Festival, and its screenplay was nominated for the 2006 Independent Spirit Award, while McDormand won the award for Best Supporting Female. The film received a limited release on April 7, 2006.

Holofcener's fourth feature, Please Give, premiered at Sundance and was screened at the Berlin International Film Festival and the Tribeca Film Festival. The film also won Holofcener the Robert Altman Award. The film also gained Holofcener a nomination with the Writers Guild of America Awards for Best Original Screenplay. It stars Keener in the duo's fourth collaboration and was released in 2010. The film also features Oliver Platt, Rebecca Hall, Amanda Peet, and Sarah Steele.

Holofcener followed this up with Enough Said starring Julia Louis-Dreyfus, James Gandolfini, and Catherine Keener. The film premiered at the 2013 Toronto International Film Festival. The romantic comedy follows the character Eva, a recent divorcée. Eva falls in love unexpectedly and discovers her new love interest is the ex-husband of her friend. To date, Enough Said is Holofcener's most financially successful film. The film was officially released on September 20, 2013, a few months after Gandolfini's death.

In 2015, it was announced that Holofcener was set to direct an adaptation of Lee Israel's memoir Can You Ever Forgive Me?, with Julianne Moore in the lead role. However, later that year, Moore was fired by Holofcener, who would later leave her directing role. Eventually Melissa McCarthy was selected for the lead role. The film, ultimately directed by Marielle Heller, was well-received by critics and garnered Holofcener a nomination for the Academy Award for Best Adapted Screenplay, and a Writers Guild of America Award for Best Adapted Screenplay.

Holofcener directed the 2015 pilot of Amazon's One Mississippi. The series was written by Tig Notaro and Diablo Cody. Notaro also starred in the series, which was produced by Louis C.K.

Holofcener's 2023 film You Hurt My Feelings stars Julia Louis-Dreyfus and Tobias Menzies. It premiered at the 2023 Sundance Film Festival and was distributed by A24.

Holofcener has been viewed as an indie filmmaker despite the financial and critical success of her feature-length films. Many of the conventions of independent film are found in her movies. Many of Holofcener's films are shot on location during their production. Much of her work has a realistic style, but her films do not always have a typical plot structure and are sometimes obscure. Holofcener portrays typical, "everyday" middle-class people and their actions, like the characters in Please Give. Holofcener's films almost always feature a female character in the lead.

== Filmography ==
=== Film ===
Short film

Year	Title	Director	Writer
1991	Angry	Yes	Yes

Feature film

Year	Title	Director	Writer	Producer	Ref.
1996	Walking and Talking	Yes	Yes	No	
2001	Lovely and Amazing	Yes	Yes	No	
2006	Friends with Money	Yes	Yes	No	
2010	Please Give	Yes	Yes	No	
2013	Enough Said	Yes	Yes	No	
2014	Every Secret Thing	No	Yes	No	
2018	The Land of Steady Habits	Yes	Yes	Yes	
2018	Can You Ever Forgive Me?	No	Yes	No	
2021	The Last Duel	No	Yes	Yes	
2023	You Hurt My Feelings	Yes	Yes	Yes	

Actress

Year	Title	Role
1982	Rollercoaster to Hell	Vera
1993	Mi Vida Loca	Warden

=== Television ===
Writer

Year	Title	Episodes
1993–1994	Ready or Not	"The New Deal"
1993–1994	Ready or Not	"Family Therapy"
1993–1994	Ready or Not	"Busy's Curse"
1993–1994	Ready or Not	"Black or White or Maybe Grey"
1993–1994	Ready or Not	"He Loves Me, He Loves Me Not"

Director

Year	Title	Episode(s)
1998	L.A. Doctors	"Nate Expectations"
1998–2000	Sex and the City	"Are We Sluts?"
1998–2000	Sex and the City	"No Ifs, Ands or Butts"
1998–2000	Sex and the City	"Three's a Crowd"
1998–2000	Sex and the City	"Bay of Married Pigs"
1999	Cold Feet	"Pilot"
2002	Gilmore Girls	"Secrets and Loans"
2002	Leap of Faith	"Pilot"
2003–2004	Six Feet Under	"Bomb Shelter"
2003–2004	Six Feet Under	"Timing & Space"
2009	Bored to Death	"The Case of the Stolen Sperm"
2011–2013	Enlightened	"The Key"
2011–2013	Enlightened	"Not Good Enough Mothers"
2011–2013	Parks and Recreation	"The Pawnee-Eagleton Tip Off Classic"
2011–2013	Parks and Recreation	"Jerry's Retirement"
2011–2013	Parks and Recreation	"Smallest Park"
2011–2013	Parks and Recreation	"Eagleton"
2015	Togetherness	"Ghost in Chains"
2015	Unbreakable Kimmy Schmidt	"Kimmy Goes to a Party!"
2015	Inside Amy Schumer	"Last F... Able Day"
2015	Orange Is the New Black	"Fake It Till You Fake It Some More"
2016	One Mississippi	"The Cat's Out"
2016	One Mississippi	"Effects"
2016	One Mississippi	"Pilot"
2019	Mrs. Fletcher	"Empty Best"
2023	Extrapolations	"2068: The Going Away Party"
2023	Lucky Hank	"The Count of Monte Cristo"
2023	Lucky Hank	"The Chopping Block"

Actress

Year	Title	Role	Episodes
2019–2020	Bojack Horseman	Herself (voice)	"A Quick One, While He's Away"
2019–2020	Bojack Horseman	Herself (voice)	"Angela"

== Awards and nominations ==
Year	Award	Category	Work	Result	Notes
2001	Satellite Award	Best Original Screenplay	Lovely and Amazing	Nominated	
2001	Independent Spirit Awards	Best Screenplay	Lovely and Amazing	Nominated	
2001	Independent Spirit Awards	Best Director	Lovely and Amazing	Nominated	
2006	Independent Spirit Awards	Best Screenplay	Friends with Money	Nominated	
2010	Writers Guild of America	Best Original Screenplay	Please Give	Nominated	
2010	Independent Spirit Awards	Best Screenplay	Please Give	Nominated	
2010	Independent Spirit Awards	Independent Spirit Robert Altman Award	Please Give	Won	
2018	USC Scripter Award		Can You Ever Forgive Me?	Nominated	
2018	Critics' Choice Movie Awards	Best Adapted Screenplay	Can You Ever Forgive Me?	Nominated	
2018	BAFTA	Best Adapted Screenplay	Can You Ever Forgive Me?	Nominated	
2018	Academy Awards	Best Adapted Screenplay	Can You Ever Forgive Me?	Nominated	
2018	Writers Guild of America	Best Adapted Screenplay	Can You Ever Forgive Me?	Won	
2018	Satellite Award	Best Adapted Screenplay	Can You Ever Forgive Me?	Won	
2018	Independent Spirit Awards	Best Screenplay	Can You Ever Forgive Me?	Won	
