= Walking and Talking =

- Theatrical release poster
- Directed by: Nicole Holofcener
- Written by: Nicole Holofcener
- Produced by: James Schamus
- Starring: Catherine Keener; Anne Heche; Todd Field; Liev Schreiber; Kevin Corrigan
- Cinematography: Michael Spiller
- Edited by: Alisa Lepselter
- Music by: Billy Bragg
- Production companies: Channel Four Films; Zenith Productions; Pandora Film; PolyGram Filmed Entertainment; Makido Films (France); Electric Pictures; Good Machine; TEAM Communications Group
- Distributed by: Miramax Films (United States); Momentum Pictures; Electric Pictures (United Kingdom); PolyGram Filmed Entertainment (International)
- Release date: July 17, 1996
- Running time: 86 minutes
- Countries: France; Germany; United Kingdom; United States
- Language: English
- Budget: $1 million
- Box office: $1.6 million

Walking and Talking is a 1996 independent film written and directed by Nicole Holofcener and starring Catherine Keener, Anne Heche, Todd Field, Liev Schreiber and Kevin Corrigan.

The film is #47 on Entertainment Weekly's "Top 50 Cult Films of All-Time" list.

The film's soundtrack includes music from Billy Bragg, Yo La Tengo, Liz Phair, and The Sea and Cake.

The film is notable for being the first collaboration between Holofcener and Keener. It was an international co-production between France, Germany, the United Kingdom and the United States.

== Plot ==
Amelia and Laura are childhood best friends. Amelia is left feeling vulnerable when Laura and her boyfriend Frank get engaged. She begins to date Bill, the local clerk at the video rental store she frequents. Though she initially is off put by his looks and his obsession with sci-fi and horror films, she begins to grow attracted to him when she learns he is working on a screenplay about the life of Colette. The two have sex; however, while Amelia is in the bathroom she receives a call from Laura asking how her date was with "the ugly guy". Hurt after hearing this, Bill abruptly leaves.

Meanwhile, since becoming engaged, Laura, a therapist, has begun to fantasize about one of her patients. She also allows the waiter at her local coffee shop to flirt with her and begins to pick fights with her fiancé.

Amelia becomes obsessed with Bill after sleeping with him, but quickly becomes hurt and angry as he never calls her. She asks her friend and former boyfriend Andrew why they broke up, and he confesses that she places too much importance on her boyfriends. After two weeks, Amelia finally goes to the video rental store and snaps when Bill is polite but distant towards her. He chases her down and tells her he heard from Laura's message that she called him ugly.

Amelia, Laura and Frank go to Amelia's parents' country cottage where Laura and Frank plan to get married. While there, Laura and Frank fight, causing Frank to leave in the middle of the night. Amelia receives obscene phone calls and calls Andrew, making him take the train to come and protect her. After Andrew answers the phone, causing the caller to stop calling, Amelia and Andrew get drunk, talk about their past relationship and then go swimming together.

Laura and Frank go to a dinner where they hope to reconcile. Frank gives Laura his biopsied mole in a box as a present, as their last fight involved her anger at him for not getting it checked by a doctor. Laura finds the present disgusting and leaves without making up with him.

Meanwhile, Amelia goes to see Bill at the video store where she learns that he is dating his ex. She goes home, where she and Andrew have dinner together, and he explains how he broke up with the girl he was having phone sex with. He then kisses Amelia and the two sleep together; she gives him the black leather pants that she bought him as a Christmas present that she never gave him, since they broke up before Christmas.

Despite the fact that she has not reconciled with Frank, Laura continues to plan her wedding. After going to see Amelia after a disastrous meeting with a wedding makeup artist, the two end up fighting as Amelia accuses Laura of abandoning their friendship. The two finally sit down to reconnect, and Amelia tells Laura about reconnecting with Andrew before urging her to go and make up with Frank. Laura takes her advice to heart.

Laura reconnects with Frank. On her wedding day she allows Amelia to do her makeup and hair as they had originally planned. Laura tells Amelia that she believes that she and Andrew are going to make it. The two leave to go to the ceremony hand in hand.

== Cast ==
- Catherine Keener as Amelia
- Anne Heche as Laura
- Todd Field as Frank
- Liev Schreiber as Andrew
- Kevin Corrigan as Bill
- Randall Batinkoff as Peter
- Alice Drummond as Betsy
- Vincent Pastore as Laura's Devil-Seeing Patient
- Joseph Siravo as Amelia's Therapist
- Allison Janney as Gum Puller

== Production ==
It took Nicole Holofcener six years to make the film as she was a first time director and the majority of the film simply involved talking between the unknown leads.

Holofcener saw Catherine Keener in a film at Sundance. After seeing her at a gym, she had a friend introduce them and then pitched Keener the screenplay offering her the role of Amelia.

== Reception ==
Rotten Tomatoes gives the film a score of 88%, based on reviews from 25 critics, with an average rating of 7.05/10.

Alison Macor of The Austin Chronicle wrote “Rarely does a first film depict characters who seem so comfortably familiar, and even less frequently are these characters three-dimensional women.” Macor added “Holofcener is quite thoughtful in constructing her characters”, and “Privileging the bond between Amelia and Laura, Holofcener's script deftly illustrates how a friendship, much like a romantic relationship, needs constant care and often requires compromises; each friend gets to be selfish at some point as long as she takes turns. In addition to an engaging script, Walking and Talking benefits from Catherine Keener's strong, quirky performance.”

Janet Maslin of The New York Times wrote "Walking and Talking, acted winningly by its two blithe stars and by the men trying to get along with them, moves confidently toward a warm affirmation of its heroines' lifelong bond. Stylishly and wittily, it also appreciates every bump in the road along the way"
