= The Ballad of Jack and Rose =

2005 drama film by Rebecca Miller

- Theatrical release poster
- Directed by: Rebecca Miller
- Written by: Rebecca Miller
- Produced by: Caroline Kaplan; Graham King; Lemore Syvan; Melissa Marr; Ethan Smith
- Starring: Daniel Day-Lewis; Catherine Keener; Camilla Belle
- Cinematography: Ellen Kuras
- Edited by: Sabine Hoffman
- Music by: Michael Rohatyn
- Production companies: Initial Entertainment Group; Elevation Filmworks
- Distributed by: IFC Films (United States); Initial Entertainment Group (Overseas)
- Release dates: January 23, 2005 (Sundance); March 25, 2005 (United States)
- Running time: 112 minutes
- Country: United States
- Language: English
- Budget: $1.5 million
- Box office: $1.1 million

The Ballad of Jack and Rose is a 2005 drama film written and directed by Rebecca Miller, and starring her husband Daniel Day-Lewis; it also stars Camilla Belle, Catherine Keener, Paul Dano, Ryan McDonald, Jason Lee, Jena Malone, Susanna Thompson and Beau Bridges. The film tells the story of an environmentalist and his teenage daughter who live on a secluded island commune. It was filmed in Rock Barra, Prince Edward Island, and in New Milford, Connecticut.

The film premiered at the 2005 Sundance Film Festival and opened in the United States on March 25, 2005.

== Plot ==
In 1986, Jack Slavin, a Scottish farmer with a heart ailment, lives on an island which had been a hippie commune decades before. He is struggling to keep landowners from building developments on the wetland. His teenaged daughter Rose is a beautiful but isolated girl with a passion for gardening. Since Rose's mother had left the family, Jack homeschooled his daughter and did not expose her to life beyond their small island home.

Jack believes that they both "need a woman around". He travels to the mainland to ask his girlfriend Kathleen to move in with them. Jack breaks the news to a shocked Rose, from whom he had kept his relationship a secret. Rose remains disdainful when Kathleen and her two teenage sons move in. Kathleen struggles to adapt to the Slavins' rural lifestyle. Her sons, Thaddius and Rodney, are almost polar opposites; Thaddius is a sullen, rude delinquent, while Rodney is insecure and often overlooked.

While she still has a strained relationship with Kathleen, Rose develops strange bonds with her new "step-brothers". It is clear that Thaddius is attracted to her, but Rose does not like him. One night, Rose spies on Jack and Kathleen in bed together, and develops a strange jealousy toward Kathleen. Rose decides to lose her virginity, and shocks Rodney by confronting him topless and asking him for sex. Rodney refuses and reasons with her, and instead ends up giving her a dramatic haircut.

Afterward, Rose calmly takes her father's shotgun and possibly misfires it into Jack and Kathleen's bedroom as they sleep. An initially shocked Jack confronts Rose in disbelief, but the two seem to forget the event within minutes. Kathleen asks Jack about his relationship with Rose, and how she might have psychological problems that should be dealt with. Jack denies that his daughter has any problems. Meanwhile, Rose and Rodney become good friends.

Rodney is often criticized by his mother for being overweight, and the two fight constantly about his diet, but Rose sees only his kindness and intelligence. However, still on a mission to lose her virginity, Rose's thoughts turn to Thaddius. While trapping a copperhead intended for scaring Kathleen, Rose sees Thaddius and a girl named Red Berry having sex in the woods. Later that night, Thaddius enters Rose's room and though she dislikes him, Rose allows him to have sex with her. The copperhead, which Rose has kept in its cage under her bed, escapes into the house when the lock of the cage is loosened and drops open by the vibrations of the bed that Thaddius and Rose are having sex in.

To irk her father, Rose hangs her bloodied bedsheet in the front yard. Jack is furious that his daughter has been "ruined" and gives Thaddius one day to move out. Meanwhile, Kathleen is cornered by the copperhead. The resulting chaos puts the whole household on edge. That night, Rose holds a screening of a homemade movie about the hippie commune in her treehouse.

As the film rolls, Thaddius advances on Rose and is stopped by Jack. After a scuffle, Thaddius falls from the treehouse and is rushed to the hospital. Rose runs away and hides for days. Jack finally finds her in one of the housing developments, but quickly leaves to take care of a "transaction". Back on the island, Jack offers Kathleen ten thousand dollars, then fifteen, in order to have her move out. Kathleen agrees at twenty thousand.

Jack returns to Rose's hideout, and she is overjoyed with the news that Kathleen is gone. That night, Rose kisses Jack; the shock that his daughter is in love with him—and that he allowed her to kiss him—makes him upset, and he weeps. Waking the next morning, the memory of the kiss haunts Jack. He and Rose go to the house of the housing developer, Marty Rance, and Jack breaks down, finding that he has no fight left in him. He tries to sell his property to Rance, upsetting Rose.

He and Rose return home, and Jack dies in his sleep overnight. Rose had originally planned to kill herself when her father died, but after setting the house on fire and lying down next to Jack's body, she changes her mind and escapes. Two years later, Rose is shown living in Vermont and working in a greenhouse where Gray, her father's friend from the island, works as well.

== Cast ==
- Daniel Day-Lewis as Jack Slavin
- Camilla Belle as Rose Slavin
- Catherine Keener as Kathleen
- Ryan McDonald as Rodney
- Paul Dano as Thaddius
- Jason Lee as Gray
- Jena Malone as Red Berry
- Beau Bridges as Marty Rance
- Susanna Thompson as Miriam Rance

== Production ==
Day-Lewis' personal assistant on the film was American actor Jeremy Strong, who was then working at an independent film company and struggling to get acting roles. At the end of filming, Day-Lewis wrote a note to Strong containing what Strong called "many of what have become [his] most deeply held precepts and beliefs about this work". He did not specify the contents of the note out of respect for Day-Lewis.

== Reception ==
The Ballad of Jack and Rose premiered at the Sundance Film Festival on January 23, 2005; it was later given a limited theatrical release on March 23, 2005, grossing $59,459 in its opening weekend, in four theaters. The highest position it reached was during its second week of release, grossing $135,100, and the lowest position it reached was at its last week of release, grossing $406. Its widest release was 74 theaters. The film grossed $712,275 domestically and just $916,051 worldwide.

Critical reception to the film was heavily divided. On the review aggregator website Rotten Tomatoes, 47% of 113 critics' reviews are positive. The website's consensus reads: "Heavy on the symbolism and overly contrived." Some critics disliked the film, such as Todd McCarthy of Variety, who wrote that it "gets caught up in incidental distractions that lead the drama astray". Others praised it; Kenneth Turan of the Los Angeles Times called the film a "model of artistic, provocative American filmmaking".

The heavy divide between critical praise and disdain was further illustrated by critics Roger Ebert and Richard Roeper, who were at odds when reviewing the film on their television program. Ebert praised the film on most accounts, ultimately calling it "an absorbing experience". Roeper, on the other hand, although impressed by the cinematography, dismissed the film and criticized the portrayal of the character of Jack, ultimately saying: "Jack and Rose's ballad is a sour song punctuated by ugly behavior from characters who are supposed to be sympathetic".

== Home media ==
The 16mm shot film was released on VHS and DVD on August 16, 2005 by Sony Pictures Home Entertainment and MGM Home Entertainment. The DVD contained commentary with director and writer Rebecca Miller and the making of The Ballad of Jack and Rose.
