= Synecdoche, New York =

2008 film by Charlie Kaufman

- Theatrical release poster
- Directed by: Charlie Kaufman
- Written by: Charlie Kaufman
- Produced by: Charlie Kaufman; Spike Jonze; Sidney Kimmel; Anthony Bregman
- Starring: Philip Seymour Hoffman; Samantha Morton; Michelle Williams; Catherine Keener; Emily Watson; Dianne Wiest; Jennifer Jason Leigh; Hope Davis; Tom Noonan
- Cinematography: Frederick Elmes
- Edited by: Robert Frazen
- Music by: Jon Brion
- Production companies: Sidney Kimmel Entertainment; Likely Story; Projective Testing Service; Russia Inc.
- Distributed by: Sony Pictures Classics
- Release dates: May 23, 2008 (Cannes); October 24, 2008 (United States, limited)
- Running time: 123 minutes
- Country: United States
- Language: English
- Budget: $20 million
- Box office: $4.5 million

Synecdoche, New York (/sɪˈnɛkdəki/ sih-NEK-də-kee) is a 2008 American postmodern psychological drama film written and directed by Charlie Kaufman in his directorial debut. It stars Philip Seymour Hoffman as an ailing theater director who works on an increasingly elaborate stage production and whose extreme commitment to realism begins to blur the boundaries between fiction and reality. The film's title is a play on Schenectady, New York, where much of the film is set, and the concept of synecdoche, wherein a part of something represents the whole or vice versa.

The film premiered in competition at the 61st Cannes Film Festival on May 23, 2008. Sony Pictures Classics acquired the United States distribution rights, paying no money but agreeing to give the film's backers part of the revenue. It had a limited theatrical release in the U.S. on October 24, 2008, and was a commercial failure on its initial release; executives at Sidney Kimmel Entertainment said they recouped much of the budget through international sales.

Synecdoche, New York polarized critics: some called it pretentious or self-indulgent and others declared it a masterpiece, with Roger Ebert ranking it as the decade's best. The film has since appeared in multiple polls of the greatest films of the 21st century.

== Plot ==
Theater director Caden Cotard finds his life unraveling. He has mysterious physical ailments and has been growing increasingly alienated from his artist wife, Adele, who creates microscopic paintings. He hits bottom when their couple's therapy fails and Adele leaves him for a new life in Berlin, taking their four-year-old daughter, Olive.

After Caden's successful production of Death of a Salesman, he unexpectedly receives a MacArthur Fellowship, giving him the means to pursue a new theatrical project on a gigantic scale. He decides to create a play of brutal realism and honesty that will span years and into which he can pour his whole self. Gathering an ensemble cast into an enormous warehouse in Manhattan's Theater District, he directs a celebration of the mundane, instructing the cast to live out their roles in real time. As the mockup stage inside the warehouse grows increasingly mimetic of the city outside, Caden continues to seek solutions to his personal crises. He is traumatized to discover that Adele has become a world-famous painter in Berlin and has given Olive a full-body tattoo.

After a failed attempt at a fling with his box-office employee, Hazel, Caden instead marries a leading actress in his cast, Claire, and has a daughter with her, though reality is blurred as he refers to Olive alone as his "real daughter". His and Claire's relationship fails, and he continues his awkward friendship with Hazel while still harboring feelings for her. Hazel lives in a house that is constantly on fire and filled with smoke. She marries and has her own children, eventually returning to work as Caden's assistant. Meanwhile, an unknown condition is gradually shutting down Caden's autonomic nervous system, so he has to walk with a cane.

As the decades pass, the continually expanding warehouse is isolated from the slow decline of the city outside. Caden buries himself ever deeper into his magnum opus, further muddying the line between reality and the world of the play by populating both the cast and crew with doppelgängers. For instance, he hires a man named Sammy to play the role of Caden himself after Sammy reveals that he has been obsessively following Caden for 20 years. (Eventually, a Sammy lookalike is cast as Sammy.) In one scene, Caden is mistaken for Ellen, the housekeeper of his absent first wife Adele's apartment, and he passively takes the role, regularly scrubbing objects in the model of her apartment. In other scenes whose reality is unclear, Caden meets with the adult Olive, who works as an erotic dancer; finally, she demands that he ask forgiveness for abandoning her as she lies on her deathbed as a result of her tattoo becoming infected. He also lives through his parents' deaths and begins a short-lived affair with Hazel's doppelgänger.

Sammy begins to romantically pursue Hazel, which sparks a revival of Caden's own relationship with her. This makes Sammy feel spurned. Mirroring an earlier moment where Caden nearly jumped off a building in anguish, Sammy jumps to his death off one of the warehouse's many buildings. Caden and Hazel finally begin a full romantic relationship, but Hazel soon dies of smoke inhalation in her constantly burning house.

As Caden becomes ever older and feebler, he continues to push against the limits of his relationships in his work and private lives. One day, the actress he hires to play Adele's housekeeper Ellen offers to take over his role as director so that he can fully commit to the role of Ellen, which relieves him of his many professional duties and stresses. She soon gives him an earpiece that she instructs him to leave in permanently. Through the earpiece, she directs his every move as he lives out his days cleaning Adele's apartment. The actress playing Caden inserts increasing amounts of her own self and personal reflections into Caden's role as Ellen. The world deteriorates into chaos until some unexplained calamity leaves the warehouse in ruins, with the corpses of his cast and crew strewn around the massive set. Eventually, an elderly Caden wakes in the abandoned set of Adele's apartment without any clear sense of where his play begins and his life ends. Following the stage directions from his earpiece, he wanders the ruins of the warehouse, finding within it another warehouse, and another within that, and so on. Finally, Caden prepares to die as he rests his head on the shoulder of an actress who had previously played Ellen's mother, seemingly the only other living person in the warehouse. As the scene fades to gray, Caden says he has a new idea for how to perform the play, but the director's voice in his ear cuts him off with his final cue: "Die".

== Cast ==
- Philip Seymour Hoffman as Caden Cotard
- Samantha Morton as Hazel
- Michelle Williams as Claire Elizabeth Keen
- Catherine Keener as Adele Lack
- Emily Watson as Tammy
- Dianne Wiest as Ellen Bascomb / Millicent Weems
- Jennifer Jason Leigh as Maria
- Hope Davis as Madeleine Gravis
- Tom Noonan as Sammy Barnathan
- Sadie Goldstein as Olive Cotard
- Robin Weigert as adult Olive
- Deirdre O'Connell as Mrs. Bascomb
- Jerry Adler as Caden's father
- Lynn Cohen as Caden's mother
- Josh Pais as Ophthalmologist
- Daniel London as Tom
- Stephen Adly Guirgis as Davis
- Amy Wright as Burning House Realtor
- Paul Sparks as Derek
- John Rothman as Dentist
- Frank Wood as Evaluative Services Doctor
- Elizabeth Marvel as Warehouse Realtor
- Daisy Tahan as Ariel
- Cliff Carpenter as Old Man
- Amy Spanger as Soap Actress Nurse
- Nick Wyman as Soap Actor Doctor
- Dan Ziskie as Leg Tremor Doctor
- Rosemary Murphy as Frances
- Alvin Epstein as Man with Nosebleed
- Tim Guinee as Needleman Actor
- Joe Lisi as Maurice
- Alice Drummond as Actress Playing Frances
- Michael Higgins as Actor Playing Man With Nosebleed
- Christopher Evan Welch as Pastor
- Peter Friedman as Emergency Room Doctor

== Production ==
After the success of Kaufman's previous three screenplays, Being John Malkovich, Adaptation, and Eternal Sunshine of the Spotless Mind, all Oscar nominees or winners, Sony Pictures Classics approached Kaufman and Spike Jonze about making a horror film. The two began working on a film dealing with things they found frightening in real life rather than typical horror-film tropes. This project evolved into Synecdoche. Jonze was slated to direct but chose to direct Where the Wild Things Are instead. Kaufman then chose to direct the film himself. Because he was an untested director, Sony Pictures Classics dropped its involvement with the film. Instead, Sidney Kimmel Entertainment invested in the project, giving the film its $20 million budget. This was low for the ambitious script, and Kaufman struggled with the limitation. The old armory the crew shot in got very hot, and the prosthetics the actors wore to show age trapped sweat. At one point, several crew members, including Kaufman, got trapped in an elevator, a phobia of Kaufman's. When the movie premiered at Cannes, the Great Recession hit, and Sidney Kimmel Entertainment shut down. Sony Pictures Classics picked the film up for distribution.

== Themes and motifs ==
=== The burning house ===
Early in the film, Hazel buys a house that is perpetually on fire. At first showing reluctance to buy it, Hazel remarks to the real estate agent, "I like it, I do. But I'm really concerned about dying in the fire," to which the agent responds, "It's a big decision, how one prefers to die." In an interview with Michael Guillén, Kaufman said, "Well, she made the choice to live there. In fact, she says in the scene just before she dies that the end is built into the beginning. That's exactly what happens there. She chooses to live in this house. She's afraid it's going to kill her but she stays there and it does. That is the truth about any choice that we make. We make choices that resonate throughout our lives." The burning house has been compared to Tennessee Williams's line "We all live in a house on fire, no fire department to call; no way out, just the upstairs window to look out of while the fire burns the house down with us trapped, locked in it." It has also been said that the house is a reference to Jungian psychology. In an interview, Kaufman mentioned that a Jungian scholar sees the house as a representation of the self.

=== The end is built into the beginning ===
The film continually brings up the phrase "The end is built into the beginning", which refers to death's connection to birth. This is emphasized by how most of time is spent being not yet born or being dead, and how life is a fraction of a second in comparison. Another connection to this theme is the film's starting and ending with a fade-in to a grey screen.

=== Miniature paintings and the impossible warehouses ===
Caden and Adele are artists, and the scale on which they both work becomes increasingly relevant to the story. Adele works on an extremely small scale, while Caden works on an impossibly large scale, constructing a full-size replica of New York City in a warehouse, and eventually a warehouse within that warehouse, and so on, continuing in this impossible cycle. Adele's name is almost a mondegreen for "a delicate art" (Adele Lack Cotard). Commenting on the scale of the paintings (actually the miniaturized paintings of artist Alex Kanevsky), Kaufman said, "In [Adele's] studio at the beginning of the movie you can see some small but regular-sized paintings that you could see without a magnifying glass ... By the time [Caden] goes to the gallery to look at her work, which is many years later, you can't see them at all." He continued, "As a dream image it appeals to me. Her work is in a way much more effective than Caden's work. Caden's goal in his attempt to do his sprawling theater piece is to impress Adele because he feels so lacking next to her in terms of his work", and added, "Caden's work is so literal. The only way he can reflect reality in his mind is by imitating it full-size ... It's a dream image but he's not interacting with it successfully."

=== Jungian psychology ===
Many reviewers believe Kaufman's writing is influenced by Jungian psychology. Carl Jung wrote that the waking and dream states are both necessary in the quest for meaning. Caden often appears to exist in a combination of the two. Kaufman has said, "I think the difference is that a movie that tries to be a dream has a punchline and the punchline is: it was a dream." Another concept in Jungian psychology is the four steps to self-realization: becoming conscious of the shadow (recognizing the constructive and destructive sides), of the anima and animus (where a man becomes conscious of his female component and a woman becomes conscious of her male component), of the archetypal spirit (where humans take on their mana personalities), and finally self-realization (where a person is fully aware of the ego and the self). Caden seems to go through all four stages. When he hires Sammy, he learns of his true personality and becomes more aware of himself. He shows awareness of his anima when replacing himself with Ellen and telling Tammy that his persona would have made him more adept in womanhood than in manhood. In taking on the role of Ellen, he becomes conscious of the archetypal spirit and finally realizes truths about his life and about love.

=== References to delusion ===
In the Cotard delusion, one believes oneself to be dead or that one's organs are missing or decaying. Caden's preoccupation with illness and dying seems related.

When Caden enters Adele's flat, the buzzer pressed (31Y) bears the name "Capgras". Capgras delusion is a psychiatric disorder in which sufferers perceive familiar people (spouses, siblings, friends) to have been replaced by identical imposters. This theme is echoed throughout the film as people are replaced by actors in Caden's play.

In the closing scenes of the film, Caden hears instructions by earpiece. This is similar to the auditory third-person hallucination described by Kurt Schneider as a first-rank symptom of schizophrenia.

=== Play within a play ===
The film is meta-referential in that it portrays a play within a play, sometimes also called mise en abyme.

This theme has been compared to William Shakespeare's line "All the world's a stage, and all the men and women merely players." It has also been compared to the music video for Icelandic singer Björk's song "Bachelorette", which portrays a woman who finds an autobiographical book about her that writes itself, which is then adapted into a play that features a play within itself. The video was directed by Michel Gondry, who also directed Kaufman's films Human Nature and Eternal Sunshine of the Spotless Mind. In an interview, Kaufman responded to the comparison: "Yeah, I heard that comparison before. The reason Michel and I found each other is because we have similar sort of ideas."

=== Death and decay ===
Throughout the film Caden refers to death's inevitability and the idea that everyone is already dead. In The Independent, Jonathan Romney wrote, "Practically everything in Caden's grotesque existence betokens mortality and decay, whether it be skin lesions, garbled fax messages or the contents of people's toilet bowls."

=== Simulacrum ===
Some reviewers have noted that the film seems inspired by postmodernist philosopher Jean Baudrillard's concept of simulacra and simulation. One of the names Caden gives his play is Simulacrum. The Guardian suggested that the film is the "ultimate postmodern novel". Baudrillard references the Jorge Luis Borges story "On Exactitude in Science" in his writings. Some commentators have compared the film's ending, when Caden is walking through his reproduction as it begins to fall apart, to the story.

=== Hazel's books ===
Hazel's books also have significance in the film. She has Marcel Proust's Swann's Way (the first volume of In Search of Lost Time) and Franz Kafka's The Trial; both relate to the film's motifs.

== Critical reception ==
On review aggregator Rotten Tomatoes, the film has an approval rating of 69% based on 195 reviews, with an average rating of 6.8/10. The website's critical consensus reads, "Charlie Kaufman's ambitious directorial debut occasionally strains to connect, but ultimately provides fascinating insight into a writer's mind." On Metacritic, the film has a weighted average score of 67 out of 100, based on 34 critics, indicating "generally favorable reviews". Several critics have compared it to Federico Fellini's 1963 film 8½.

In his review in the Chicago Sun-Times, Roger Ebert wrote, "I watched it the first time and knew it was a great film ... the subject of Synecdoche, New York is nothing less than human life and how it works. Using a neurotic theater director from upstate New York, it encompasses every life and how it copes and fails. Think about it a little and, my god, it's about you. Whoever you are." In 2009 Ebert wrote that the movie was the best of the decade. Manohla Dargis of The New York Times wrote, "To say that [it] is one of the best films of the year or even one closest to my heart is such a pathetic response to its soaring ambition that I might as well pack it in right now ... Despite its slippery way with time and space and narrative and Mr. Kaufman's controlled grasp of the medium, Synecdoche, New York is as much a cry from the heart as it is an assertion of creative consciousness. It's extravagantly conceptual but also tethered to the here and now." In the Los Angeles Times, Carina Chocano called the film "wildly ambitious ... sprawling, awe-inspiring, heartbreaking, frustrating, hard-to-follow and achingly, achingly sad."

Negative reviews mostly called the film incomprehensible, pretentious, depressing, or self-indulgent. Rex Reed, Richard Brody, and Roger Friedman all called it one of the worst films of 2008. Owen Gleiberman of Entertainment Weekly gave the film a D+ and wrote, "I gave up making heads or tails of Synecdoche, New York, but I did get one message: The compulsion to stand outside of one's life and observe it to this degree isn't the mechanism of art—it's the structure of psychosis." Critic Jonathan Rosenbaum wrote, "it seems more like an illustration of his script than a full-fledged movie, proving how much he needs a Spike Jonze or a Michel Gondry to realize his surrealistic conceits." The New Yorker's Anthony Lane wrote that there "has long been a strain of sorry lassitude in Kaufman’s work, and here it sickens into the morbid."

The Moving Arts Film Journal ranked the film 80th on its list of "The 100 Greatest Movies of All Time".

=== Top-ten lists ===
The film appeared on many film critics' top-ten lists for 2008. Both Kimberley Jones and Marjorie Baumgarten of the Austin Chronicle named it the best film of the year, as did Ray Bennett of The Hollywood Reporter.

It appeared on 101 "Best of 2008" lists, with 20 of them giving it the top spot. Those who placed it in their top ten included Manohla Dargis of The New York Times, Richard Corliss of Time, Shawn Anthony Levy of The Oregonian, Josh Rosenblatt of the Austin Chronicle, Joe Neumaier of the New York Daily News, Ty Burr and Wesley Morris of the Boston Globe, Philip Martin of the Arkansas Democrat-Gazette, Scott Foundas of LA Weekly, and Walter Chaw, Bill Chambers, and Ian Pugh of Film Freak Central (all three of whom placed it at number one).

Roger Ebert of the Chicago Sun-Times named it the best film of the 2000s. In the 2012 Sight & Sound poll, four critics ranked it among the 10 greatest films of all time, and Ebert considered the film a strong contender for his own list. Also in 2012, in Time, Richard Corliss ranked it 7th on his list of the "Greatest Movies of the Millennium (Thus Far)".

In a 2016 BBC critics' poll, Synecdoche, New York was ranked the 20th-greatest film of the 21st century.

In 2019, the film ranked 7th in The Guardian's 100 Best Films of the 21st Century poll.

== Awards and nominations ==
The film was nominated by the Visual Effects Society Awards in the categories of "Outstanding Supporting Visual Effects in a Feature Motion Picture", "Outstanding Matte Paintings in a Feature Motion Picture", and "Outstanding Created Environment in a Feature Motion Picture".

The film was nominated for "Best Feature" and won "Best Ensemble Performance" at the 2008 Gotham Independent Film Awards.

The film was nominated for both the Palme d'Or and the Golden Camera at the 2008 Cannes Film Festival.

== Influence ==
Some critics have compared the film to the American docu-comedy television series The Rehearsal.

== See also ==
- Anomie
- Map–territory relation
- Droste effect
