= Please Give =

2010 film by Nicole Holofcener

- Theatrical release poster
- Directed by: Nicole Holofcener
- Written by: Nicole Holofcener
- Produced by: Anthony Bregman
- Starring: Catherine Keener; Amanda Peet; Oliver Platt; Rebecca Hall; Ann Guilbert; Sarah Steele
- Cinematography: Yaron Orbach
- Edited by: Robert Frazen
- Music by: Marcelo Zarvos
- Production company: Likely Story
- Distributed by: Sony Pictures Classics
- Release dates: January 22, 2010 (Sundance); April 30, 2010 (United States)
- Running time: 87 minutes
- Country: United States
- Language: English
- Budget: $3 million
- Box office: $4.5 million

Please Give is a 2010 American comedy-drama film written and directed by Nicole Holofcener. It stars Catherine Keener, Amanda Peet, Oliver Platt, Rebecca Hall, Ann Guilbert, and Sarah Steele. It revolves around married antique-dealers butting heads with the granddaughters of the elderly woman who lives in the apartment the couple owns.

The film had its world premiere at the Sundance Film Festival on January 22, 2010, and was theatrically released in the United States on April 30, 2010, by Sony Pictures Classics. It grossed over $4.5 million worldwide against a $3 million budget. It received positive reviews from critics, who mostly praised Holofcener's screenplay and the performances of the cast, and was named one of the top 10 independent films of 2010 by the National Board of Review. At the 26th Independent Spirit Awards, the film was given the Robert Altman Award and Holofcener was nominated for Best Screenplay.

== Plot summary ==
Kate and Alex are a couple living in a New York City apartment with their teenage daughter, Abby. Kate and Alex own a furniture store specializing in used modern furniture, which they buy at estate sales. They have bought the apartment adjacent to theirs, but its occupant, the elderly and cranky Andra, will stay in it until she dies. Andra has two granddaughters, the dutiful and generous Rebecca, a mammography technologist, and the cynical, sharp-tongued Mary, a cosmetologist.

Kate is troubled by the profits she makes from furniture sellers who do not know the value of what they are selling; the contrast between homeless people in her neighborhood and her own comfortable life; and the fact that her family will only be able to expand their apartment when Andra dies. She tries to assuage her guilt through volunteer jobs (which leave her weeping) and donations to homeless individuals (which sometimes backfire).

== Cast ==
- Catherine Keener as Kate
- Amanda Peet as Mary
- Oliver Platt as Alex
- Rebecca Hall as Rebecca
- Ann Guilbert as Andra
- Sarah Steele as Abby
- Thomas Ian Nicholas as Eugene
- Lois Smith as Mrs. Portman
- Josh Pais as Adam
- Amy Wright as Erin
- Elizabeth Keener as Cathy
- Elise Ivy as Marissa
- Scott Cohen as Dr. Lerner
- John Srednicki as Tommy
- Timothy Doyle as Kevin
- Rebecca Budig as Big Back
- Romy Rosemont as Carrie-Ann
- Kathleen Doyle as Anita
- Kevin Corrigan as Don
- Elizabeth Berridge as Elyse
- Portia as Mrs. Melnick
- Paul Sparks as Blind Date
- Arthur French as Man Waiting for a Table

== Release ==
Please Give was screened out of competition at the 60th Berlin International Film Festival, and had a limited U.S. release on April 30, 2010. It opened with $118,123 in five theaters, averaging $23,625 per cinema.

== Filming ==
Please Give was filmed almost entirely in New York City. The bulk of the film was shot in Chelsea, including the spa scenes at Skintology, a day and medical spa.

== Reception ==
=== Box office ===
Please Give grossed $4,033,574 in the United States and Canada, and $533,088 in other territories, for a worldwide total of $4,566,662.

=== Critical response ===
On the review aggregator website Rotten Tomatoes, 85% of 140 critics' reviews are positive, with an average rating of 7.5/10. The website's consensus reads: "Nicole Holofcener's newest might seem slight in places, but its rendering of complex characters in a conflicted economic landscape is varied, natural, and touching all the same." Metacritic, which uses a weighted average, assigned the film a score of 78 out of 100, based on 35 critics, indicating "generally favorable" reviews.

Manohla Dargis of The New York Times opined, "Few American filmmakers create female characters as realistically funny, attractively imperfect and flat-out annoying as does Ms. Holofcener."

Kenneth Turan of the Los Angeles Times stated, "Please Give concerns itself with the free-floating, amorphous guilt that's often characteristic of the modern urban condition. Obviously, it is a fine thing to help, to give, but Please Give wonders whether a good thing can be overdone, whether too much liberal guilt can leave you feeling too bad for too many people to do any real good."

Lisa Schwarzbaum of Entertainment Weekly gave the film an "A−" and wrote, "With their shared characteristics of sex, age, motherhood, and brunet hair, Keener has become Holofcener's artistic alter ego. In Please Give, the sharp-eyed filmmaker sends her vibrant representative out into the world to explore what it means for a woman to be lucky and still feel itchy."

Justin Chang of Variety commented, "Like Holofcener's previous pictures, Please Give derives its narrative energy less from a series of plotted incidents than from its keenly observed interplay of clashing personality tics and worldviews."

David Edelstein of New York Magazine described the film as "an engagingly high-strung comedy about lack of empathy and the gnawing guilt that can attend it" and remarked, "Holofcener's plotting can seem casual, but her dialogue is smart, an oscillating mixture of abrasiveness and balm, of harsh satire and compassionate pullback."

Peter Travers of Rolling Stone gave the film 3.5 out of 4 stars and noted, "The pitch-perfect performances help Holofcener stir up feelings that cut to the heart of what defines an ethical life. There's no movie around right now with a subject more pertinent. It'll hit you hard."

Peter Bradshaw of The Guardian gave the film 3 out of 5 stars and stated, "Please Give is an interesting and refreshing turn for the better. As an ensemble comedy, it has more bounce, more life and more comic oxygen."

=== Accolades ===
At the 15th Satellite Awards, the film's editor Robert Frazen won for Best Editing. It was also nominated for Best Film – Musical or Comedy, ultimately losing to Scott Pilgrim vs. the World.
