= Lovely & Amazing =

2001 film by Nicole Holofcener

- Original poster
- Directed by: Nicole Holofcener
- Written by: Nicole Holofcener
- Produced by: Anthony Bregman; Ted Hope; Eric d'Arbeloff
- Starring: Brenda Blethyn; Catherine Keener; Emily Mortimer; Raven Goodwin; Jake Gyllenhaal; James LeGros; Dermot Mulroney
- Cinematography: Harlan Bosmajian
- Edited by: Robert Frazen
- Music by: Craig Richey
- Production companies: Good Machine; Roadside Attractions
- Distributed by: Lions Gate Films
- Release dates: August 31, 2001 (Telluride Film Festival); June 28, 2002 (limited); August 2, 2002
- Running time: 91 minutes
- Country: United States
- Language: English
- Budget: $250,000
- Box office: $4.6 million

Lovely & Amazing is a 2001 American comedy-drama film written and directed by Nicole Holofcener.

== Summary ==
The story focuses on Jane Marks, her adult daughters Michelle and Elizabeth, and her pre-teen adopted African American daughter Annie, each of whom allows her personal insecurities to affect her life.

Jane, longing to look younger and thinner, decides to get liposuction, which results in a lengthy hospital stay after she develops complications following the procedure. The resulting health struggles force Jane to wonder what will happen, after her death, to Annie. Jane’s health struggles are further exacerbated by unhelpful nursing staff and a fleeting attraction to her doctor. The complications eventually take a toll on Jane, and she becomes unconscious, worrying her daughters.

Michelle passes her time making arts and crafts and attempts to sell them to small businesses. Michelle has a difficult relationship with her husband Bill, who is frustrated by her inability to earn money. She confides in her friend Donna, who, unbeknownst to Michelle, is having an affair with Bill. After a few failed starts, she takes a job at a one-hour photo lab, working alongside 17-year-old Jordan, with whom she later has sex. After attending Elizabeth’s movie premiere, Michelle meets Jordan at his house for another encounter, but Jordan’s mother calls the police, and Michelle is arrested for statutory rape.

Elizabeth is an aspiring actress coming off a brief appearance in a major motion picture. She is in a relationship with Paul, to whom she struggles to offer affection, which results in her taking in various stray dogs. After a revealing photo shoot, she begins to question her sex appeal, especially as she is up for an audition in another film alongside heartthrob Kevin McCabe. Despite the intense audition, where McCabe passionately makes out with Elizabeth, she doesn’t get the part, furthering her insecurities. Afterward, a chance encounter with McCabe results in the two meeting for dinner and they later have sex, where she asks him to point out her various physical flaws. Despite McCabe’s harsh honesty, Elizabeth leaves the date feeling more confident in herself.

Annie struggles to adjust to Jane being away from her for a time, as well as fitting in with her white adopted family. While she has a good relationship with Elizabeth, she and Michelle have a mildly challenging relationship. She also spends her time with her Black Big Sister volunteer Lorraine, who Jane hopes will put the young girl in touch with her heritage. Lorraine usually takes her to the public pool and helps Annie straighten her hair, despite Elizabeth’s objection and Jane’s disappointment. Eventually, Annie’s behavior becomes too much for Lorraine, who decides to stop spending time with her.

At night, a hungry Annie decides to walk to a nearby McDonald’s by herself. Michelle, after being released by the police, makes her way to the same McDonald’s and encounters Annie. They talk and finally begin to bond. The two pick up Michelle’s daughter and head back home to Elizabeth. The next morning, as Elizabeth fields a phone call from McCabe, she receives a call from the hospital, telling her that her mother can come home. The women drive to meet with a fully recovered Jane, who is last seen showing pictures of her daughters to the only nurse who helped her during her hospital stay.

== Сast ==
- Catherine Keener as Michelle Marks
- Brenda Blethyn as Jane Marks, Michelle's mother
- Emily Mortimer as Elizabeth Marks, Michelle's younger sister
- Raven Goodwin as Annie Marks, Michelle's adoptive younger sister
- Aunjanue Ellis as Lorraine
- Clark Gregg as Bill
- Jake Gyllenhaal as Jordan
- James LeGros as Paul
- Michael Nouri as Dr. Crane
- Dermot Mulroney as Kevin McCabe
- Spencer Garrett as Willy
- Dreya Weber as Donna

== Production ==
The film debuted at the 2001 Telluride Film Festival. Prior to its initial limited release in New York City and Los Angeles, it was shown at the Los Angeles Film Festival, the Toronto International Film Festival, and the Tribeca Film Festival.

In its widest release, the film played on only 175 screens in the US. It grossed $4,210,379 domestically and $485,402 in foreign markets for a total worldwide box office of $4,695,781.

== Critical reception ==
Lovely & Amazing received a "fresh" rating from Rotten Tomatoes, reporting that 86% of critics gave the a film positive review, based on 123 reviews. At Metacritic, which assigns a weighted average out of 100 to critics' reviews, the film received a score of 75 based on 31 reviews.

In his review in The New York Times, Stephen Holden said, "As smart and observant as it is, Lovely and Amazing doesn't really go anywhere. Ms. Holofcener's sharp, witty dialogue shows an ear acutely tuned to the edgy, competitive nuances of contemporary banter, and the movie expertly evokes the rivalry percolating just below the surface of the Markses' relationships. But once family members have weathered their personal crises, little seems to have changed."

Roger Ebert of the Chicago Sun-Times observed, "Here is a movie that knows its women, listens to them, doesn't give them a pass, allows them to be real: It's a rebuke to the shallow Ya-Ya Sisterhood."

In Variety, Todd McCarthy said, "Engaging, intermittently insightful but too glib to wring full value out of its subject matter, this brightly performed study of an extended family of females has enough going for it to quickly graduate from the fest circuit to a respectable career in specialized release . . . [it] evinces keen antenna for (mostly) female foibles, a good ear for dialogue, talent for directing thesps and a clean, unfussy visual style."

Mick LaSalle of the San Francisco Chronicle said, "Nicole Holofcener throws a bunch of issues on the table and takes time to linger over them, without worrying much about where her story's going or even if she has one. The result is a gutsy little picture and a nice slice of life."

In Rolling Stone, Peter Travers opined, "In this painfully funny and touching look at the vanities and insecurities that a mother can pass on to her daughters in the name of love, writer-director Nicole Holofcener does a chick flick right . . . Holofcener's film feels untidily honest. It's true to life, not to the Hollywood version."

Kenneth Turan of the Los Angeles Times said, "Like the best of personal, independent cinema . . . it is both marvelously observed and completely individual. There is no film like this film, and that is something you don't hear every day . . . it's so accurate about how people attempt meaningful emotional connections in an uncaring world of self-involvement, obtuseness and free-floating insecurity that it ought to be put in a time capsule."

== Awards and nominations ==
- Independent Spirit Award for Best Supporting Actress (Emily Mortimer, winner)
- Independent Spirit Award for Best Film (nominee)
- Independent Spirit Award for Best Director (nominee)
- Independent Spirit Award for Best Screenplay (nominee)
- Independent Spirit Award for Best Actress (Catherine Keener, nominee)
- Independent Spirit Award for Best Debut Performance (Raven Goodwin, nominee)
- Satellite Award for Best Original Screenplay (nominee)
- Satellite Award for Best Actress - Motion Picture Musical or Comedy (Keener, nominee)
- Satellite Award for Best Supporting Actress - Motion Picture (Mortimer, nominee)
- Chicago Film Critics Association Award for Best Supporting Actress (Mortimer, nominee)
- Black Reel Award for Best Breakthrough Performance (Goodwin, nominee)

== See also ==
- List of American films of 2001
