= Reading specialist certification =

Reading Specialist Certification is required to serve as a reading specialist in elementary and high schools. Reading specialists are professionals who aim to improve reading achievement in their district or school by serving as teachers, coaches, or leaders of school reading programs. The reading specialist is authorized to teach reading and to provide technical assistance and professional development to teachers. The reading specialist also supports, supplements and extends classroom teaching, and works collaboratively to implement a quality reading program that is research-based and meets the needs of students.

== Individual state standards ==
Certification generally involves completing literacy-related coursework after one has obtained a bachelor's degree. Each state has different criteria for obtaining reading specialist certification. Some states require general teacher certification, and some require at least one year of teaching experience in a general classroom, before obtaining reading specialist certification. It may be issued as a full certificate or as an endorsement on an existing teaching certificate. Some states require applicants to pass a reading specialist content area examination.

== International Reading Association standards ==
The International Reading Association has its own standards for reading specialists, which they also term literacy coaches. They posit that a reading specialist must have valid teaching certification, teaching experience, and a master's degree with concentration in reading and writing education. The International Reading Association also believes that reading specialists should undergo coursework that builds skills and knowledge that would result in ability to take on leadership skills with the school reading program, fostering knowledge among staff and students. In addition, the Association recommends that specialists seeking certification should complete 21–27 hours of language arts, reading, and other related courses at the graduate level. They state that the graduate-level coursework should include a practicum with a supervisor, recommended to be 6 semester hours. The supervised practicum experience should require working with students who struggle with reading, as well as collaborative and coaching experiences with teachers.

== U.S. Department of Education standards ==
The U.S. Department of Education facilitates learning more about state-specific certification criteria.

== Examples of university standards ==
An alternate view of Reading Specialist Certification is provided by several universities. At Northeastern Illinois University and Dominican University, accredited by the International Reading Association, students undergo 36 graduate semester hours to earn a Master of Arts in Reading degree, along with reading specialist certification.

At the University of Illinois at Chicago, applicants must complete 39 course credit hours, resulting in a graduate degree: Language, Literacy, and Culture M.Ed. degree, along with reading specialist certification.
