= 28th Golden Horse Awards =

Award ceremony for Chinese-language films of 1990 and 1991

- Date: December 4, 1991
- Site: National Theater, Taipei, Taiwan
- Hosted by: Ling Feng and Sibelle Hu
- Preshow hosts: Sun Xing and Chang Yueh-li
- Organized by: Taipei Golden Horse Film Festival Executive Committee

Highlights
- Best Feature Film: A Brighter Summer Day
- Best Director: Wong Kar-wai; Days of Being Wild
- Best Actor: Sihung Lung; Pushing Hands
- Best Actress: Maggie Cheung; Center Stage
- Most awards: Days of Being Wild (6)
- Most nominations: A Brighter Summer Day (12)

Television in Taiwan
- Channel: TTV

The 28th Golden Horse Awards (Mandarin:第28屆金馬獎) took place on December 4, 1991, at the National Theater in Taipei, Taiwan.

== Winners and nominees ==
Winners are listed first and highlighted in boldface.

| **Best Feature Film**: **A Brighter Summer Day**; Center Stage; Wawa; Days of Being Wild; Dreams of Glory: A Boxer's Story; Pushing Hands | **Best Documentary Film**: **The Voice of the People**; 玉山九千英尺——台灣鳥類開拓史末章‧帝雉時代; 藍鵲飛過; 巧宛然 |
| **Best Animation** - | **Best Director**: **Wong Kar-wai — Days of Being Wild**; Stanley Kwan — Center Stage; Edward Yang — A Brighter Summer Day; Ang Lee — Pushing Hands |
| **Best Leading Actor**: **Sihung Lung — Pushing Hands**; Leslie Cheung — Days of Being Wild; Chang Kuo-chu — A Brighter Summer Day; Chang Chen — A Brighter Summer Day | **Best Leading Actress**: **Maggie Cheung — Center Stage**; Anita Mui — Au Revoir, Mon Amour; Lisa Yang — A Brighter Summer Day; Carina Lau — Days of Being Wild |
| **Best Supporting Actor**: **Kwan Hoi-san — Lee Rock**; Chan Tak-hing — Dreams of Glory: A Boxer's Story; Kent Tong — The Tigers; Tuo Tsung-hua — Zodiac Killers | **Best Supporting Actress**: **Wang Lai — Pushing Hands**; **Rebecca Pan — Days of Being Wild**; Elaine Jin — A Brighter Summer Day; Chiang Hsiu-chiung — A Brighter Summer Day |
| **Special Jury Award**: **Center Stage**; **Ang Lee — Pushing Hands** | **Jury's Special Award -** **Honourable Animation Production Award**: **Sisyphean Day** |
| **Special Contribution Award**: **Sha Yung-fong** | **Special Achievement Award**: **Jackie Chan** |
