= 4th Golden Horse Awards =

1966 film awards ceremony in Taiwan

- Date: October 30, 1966
- Site: Zhongshan Hall, Taipei, Taiwan
- Hosted by: Chiu Nan
- Organized by: Taipei Golden Horse Film Festival Executive Committee

Highlights
- Best Feature Film: The Beauty of Beauties
- Best Director: Li Han-hsiang; The Beauty of Beauties
- Best Actor: Zhao Lei; The Beauty of Beauties
- Best Actress: Gua Ah-leh; The Rain of Sorrow
- Most awards: The Beauty of Beauties (5)

The 4th Golden Horse Awards (Chinese: 第4屆金馬獎) took place on October 30, 1966, at Zhongshan Hall in Taipei, Taiwan.

== Winners and nominees ==
Winners are listed first, highlighted in boldface.

**Best Feature Film**: **The Beauty of Beauties**; The Silent Wife (runner-up); The Beggar's Daughter (runner-up); Feng Huo Zhong Sheng (runner-up)	**Best Documentary**: **Cheng Gong Ling Zhi Ge**; Chong Qing Yan Xi (runner-up); Chengcing Lake (runner-up)
**Golden Horse Grant**: **Phoenix**	**Best Director**: **Li Han-hsiang — The Beauty of Beauties**
**Best Leading Actor**: **Zhao Lei — The Beauty of Beauties**	**Best Leading Actress**: **Gua Ah-leh — The Rain of Sorrow**
**Best Supporting Actor**: **Wu Chia-chi — The Beggar's Daughter**	**Best Supporting Actress**: **Lu Pi-yun — The Rain of Sorrow**
**Best Child Star**: **Tse Ling-ling — Four Loves**	**Best Screenplay**: **King Hu — Sons of Good Earth**
**Best Cinematography - Color**: **Wang Chien-han — The Beauty of Beauties**	**Best Cinematography - Black-and-White** —
**Best Film Editing**: **Chiang Hsing-lung — Sons of Good Earth**	**Best Music**: **Tso Hung-yuan — The Silent Wife**
**Best Sound Recording**: **Hung Jui-ting — The Silent Wife**	**Best Cinematography for Documentary**: **Chi Ho-hsi — Chengcing Lake**
**Best Planning for Documentary**: **Kung Min — Cheng Gong Ling Zhi Ge**	**Special Award - Outstanding Performance**: **Wang Mo-chou — The Silent Wife**
**Special Award of National Spirit**: **Sons of Good Earth**	
