= Yanyu mengmeng =

- Traditional Chinese: 煙雨濛濛
- Simplified Chinese: 烟雨濛濛
- Literal meaning: Misty Rain
Transcriptions
Standard Mandarin
- Hanyu Pinyin: Yānyǔ méngméng

Yanyu mengmeng may refer to:

- Fire and Rain (novel), a 1964 Taiwanese novel by Chiung Yao
- The Rain of Sorrow, a 1965 Taiwanese film adaptation of the novel
- Lovers Under the Rain, a 1986 Taiwanese TV adaptation of the novel

== See also ==
- Romance in the Rain, a 2001 Chinese TV adaptation of the novel
