= List of awards and nominations received by Ang Lee =

Ang Lee awards and nominations
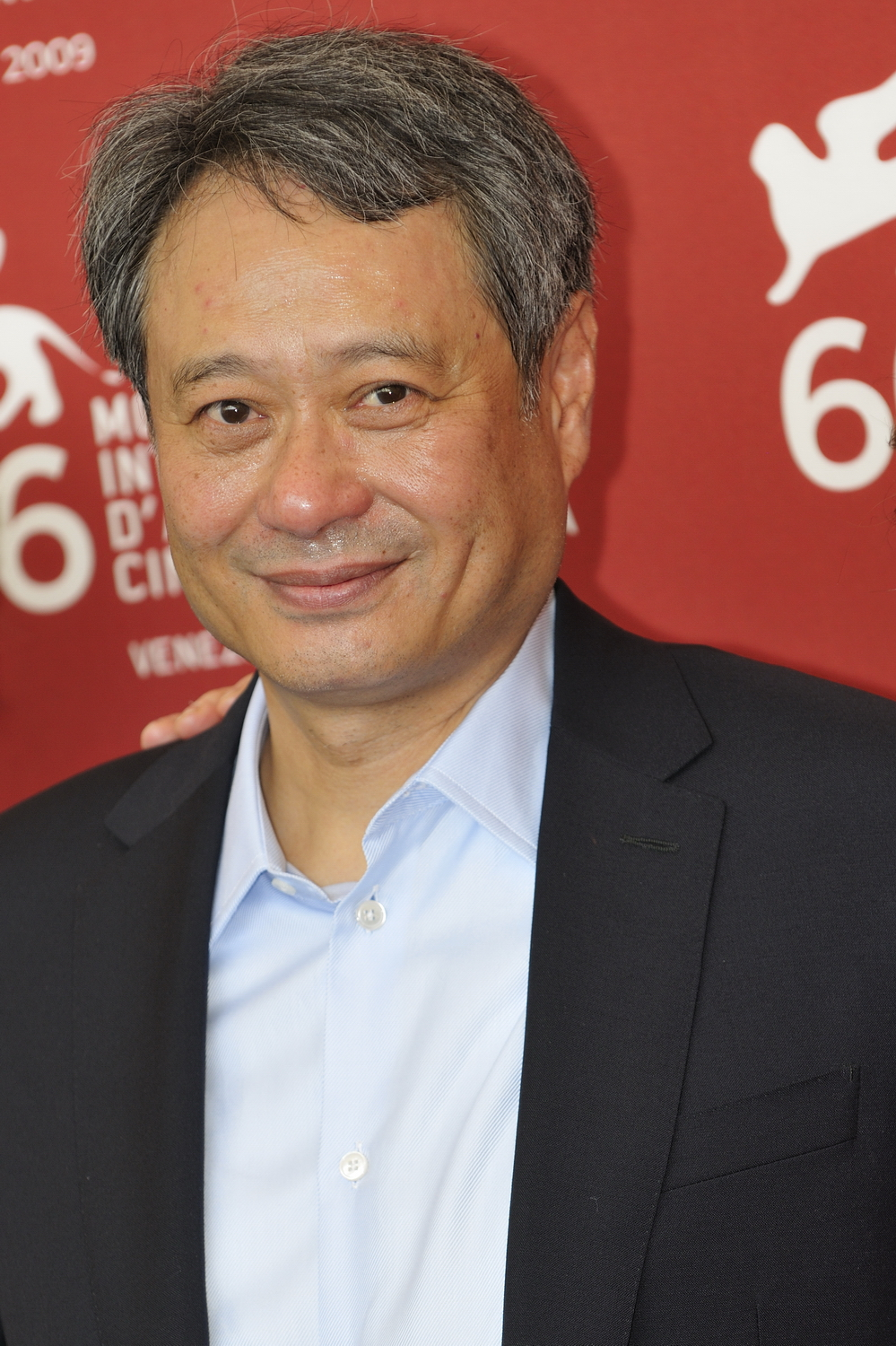
- Lee in 2009
Awards and nominations
Award	Wins	Nominations
Golden Globe	3	8
Academy Awards	2	5
BAFTA Awards	4	10

Ang Lee is a Taiwanese filmmaker. He is most known for his films, Eat Drink Man Woman (1994), Sense and Sensibility (1995), The Ice Storm (1997), Crouching Tiger, Hidden Dragon (2000), Hulk (2003), Brokeback Mountain (2005), Lust, Caution (2007), and Life of Pi (2012).

Three of Lee's films have been nominated for the Academy Award for Best Foreign Language Film with Crouching Tiger, Hidden Dragon (2000) winning. The other two nominations were The Wedding banquet (1993), Eat Drink Man Woman (1994). His films Sense and Sensibility (1995), Crouching Tiger, Hidden Dragon (2000), Brokeback Mountain (2005), Life of Pi (2012) were nominated for the Academy Award for Best Picture. He has also received ten British Academy Film Award nominations winning four awards for Sense and Sensibility, Crouching Tiger, Hidden Dragon, and Brokeback Mountain. In 2020 he received the BAFTA Fellowship for Outstanding Contributions to British Cinema. He has also received eight nominations for Golden Globe Awards, Independent Spirit Awards, and Critics' Choice Movie Awards. He has been honored by the Directors Guild of America and the Producers Guild of America. His films have also premiered and competed at the Cannes Film Festival, Venice Film Festival, and Berlin Film Festival.

Lee has received various honors including the Knight of the French Ordre des Arts et des Lettres in 2012 from the French Government. In 2021, he became a Knight of the French highest honour Legion of Honor.

== Major associations ==
=== Academy Awards ===
Year	Category	Nominated work	Result
2001	Crouching Tiger, Hidden Dragon	Best Picture	Nominated
2001	Crouching Tiger, Hidden Dragon	Best Director	Nominated
2006	Brokeback Mountain	Best Director	Won
2013	Life of Pi	Best Director	Won
2013	Life of Pi	Best Picture	Nominated

=== British Academy Film Awards ===
Year	Category	Nominated work	Result	Ref.
1995	Best Film	Sense and Sensibility	Won	
1995	Best Director	Sense and Sensibility	Nominated	
2000	Best Film	Crouching Tiger, Hidden Dragon	Nominated	
2000	Best Director	Crouching Tiger, Hidden Dragon	Won	
2000	Best Film Not in the English Language	Crouching Tiger, Hidden Dragon	Won	
2005	Best Director	Brokeback Mountain	Won	
2012	Best Film	Life of Pi	Nominated	
2012	Best Director	Life of Pi	Nominated	
2020	BAFTA Fellowship		Received	

=== Golden Globe Awards ===
Year	Category	Nominated work	Result	Ref.
1993	Best Foreign Language Film	The Wedding Banquet	Nominated	
1994	Best Foreign Language Film	Eat Drink Man Woman	Nominated	
1995	Best Director	Sense and Sensibility	Nominated	
2000	Best Foreign Language Film	Crouching Tiger, Hidden Dragon	Won	
2000	Best Director	Crouching Tiger, Hidden Dragon	Won	
2005	Best Director	Brokeback Mountain	Won	
2012	Best Director	Life of Pi	Nominated	

=== Independent Spirit Awards ===
Year	Category	Nominated work	Result
1994	Best Feature	The Wedding Banquet	Nominated
2001	Best Feature	Crouching Tiger, Hidden Dragon	Won
1994	Best Director	The Wedding Banquet	Nominated
1995	Best Director	Eat Drink Man Woman	Nominated
2001	Best Director	Crouching Tiger, Hidden Dragon	Won
2006	Best Director	Brokeback Mountain	Won
1994	Best Screenplay	The Wedding Banquet	Nominated
1995	Best Screenplay	Eat Drink Man Woman	Nominated

=== Critics' Choice Award ===
Year	Category	Nominated work	Result
1995	Best Picture	Sense and Sensibility	Won
2000	Best Picture	Crouching Tiger, Hidden Dragon	Nominated
2006	Best Picture	Brokeback Mountain	Won
2012	Best Picture	Life of Pi	Nominated
2006	Best Director	Brokeback Mountain	Won
2012	Best Director	Life of Pi	Nominated
2000	Best Foreign Language Film	Crouching Tiger, Hidden Dragon	Won
2007	Best Foreign Language Film	Lust Caution	Nominated

== Festival awards ==
=== Cannes Film Festival ===
Year	Category	Nominated work	Result
1997	Palme d'Or	The Ice Storm	Nominated
2009	Palme d'Or	Taking Woodstock	Nominated

=== Berlin International Film Festival ===
Year	Category	Nominated work	Result
1993	Golden Bear	The Wedding Banquet	Won
1996	Golden Bear	Sense and Sensibility	Won

=== Venice Film Festival ===
Year	Category	Nominated work	Result
2005	Golden Lion	Brokeback Mountain	Won
2007	Golden Lion	Lust, Caution	Won

== Guild awards ==
=== Producers Guild of America Award ===
Year	Category	Nominated work	Result
2001	PGA Award – Motion Pictures	Crouching Tiger, Hidden Dragon	Nominated
2012	PGA Award – Motion Pictures	Life of Pi	Nominated

=== Directors Guild of America Award ===
Year	Category	Nominated work	Result
1996	DGA Award – Motion Pictures	Sense and Sensibility	Nominated
2001	DGA Award – Motion Pictures	Crouching Tiger, Hidden Dragon	Won
2006	DGA Award – Motion Pictures	Brokeback Mountain	Won
2012	DGA Award – Motion Pictures	Life of Pi	Nominated

== Miscellaneous awards ==
Year	Award	Category	Nominated work	Result
NBR Award	Best Director	1995	Sense and Sensibility	Won
NBR Award	Best Director	2005	Brokeback Mountain	Won
NBR Award	Best Foreign Language Film	1994	Eat Drink Man Woman	Won
NBR Award	Best Foreign Language Film	2000	Crouching Tiger, Hidden Dragon	Won
NBR Award	Best film	1995	Sense and Sensibility	Won
Saturn Award	Best Direction	2001	Crouching Tiger, Hidden Dragon	Nominated
Saturn Award	Best Direction	2012	Life of Pi	Nominated
Saturn Award	Best Action or Adventure Film	2001	Crouching Tiger, Hidden Dragon	Won
Saturn Award	Best Science Fiction Film	2003	Hulk	Nominated
Saturn Award	Best Fantasy Film	2012	Life of Pi	Won
Golden Horse Film Festival and Awards	Best Feature Film	1993	The Wedding Banquet	Won
Golden Horse Film Festival and Awards	Best Feature Film	1994	Eat Drink Man Woman	Nominated
Golden Horse Film Festival and Awards	Best Feature Film	2000	Crouching Tiger, Hidden Dragon	Won
Golden Horse Film Festival and Awards	Best Feature Film	2007	Lust, Caution	Won
Golden Horse Film Festival and Awards	Best Director	1991	Pushing Hands	Nominated
Golden Horse Film Festival and Awards	Best Director	1993	The Wedding Banquet	Won
Golden Horse Film Festival and Awards	Best Director	2000	Crouching Tiger, Hidden Dragon	Nominated
Golden Horse Film Festival and Awards	Best Director	2007	Lust, Caution	Won
Hugo Award	Best Dramatic Presentation	2001	Crouching Tiger, Hidden Dragon	Won
AACTA Awards	Best Foreign Film	1998	The Ice Storm	Nominated
AACTA Awards	Best Foreign Film	2000	Crouching Tiger, Hidden Dragon	Won
AACTA Awards	Best Direction – International	2012	Life of Pi	Nominated

== Critics awards ==
Year	Award	Category	Nominated work	Result
New York Film Critics Circle Awards	Best Director	1995	Sense and Sensibility	Won
New York Film Critics Circle Awards	Best Director	2005	Brokeback Mountain	Won
New York Film Critics Circle Awards	Best Film	2005	Brokeback Mountain	Won
London Film Critics' Circle	Best Film	2005	Brokeback Mountain	Won
London Film Critics' Circle	Best Director	2005	Brokeback Mountain	Won
London Film Critics' Circle	Best Director	2012	Life of Pi	Won
Los Angeles Film Critics Association	Best Film	2000	Crouching Tiger, Hidden Dragon	Won
Los Angeles Film Critics Association	Best Film	2005	Brokeback Mountain	Won
Los Angeles Film Critics Association	Best Director	2005	Brokeback Mountain	Won
Boston Society of Film Critics	Best Director	1995	Sense and Sensibility	Won
Boston Society of Film Critics	Best Director	2005	Brokeback Mountain	Won
Boston Society of Film Critics	Best Film	1995	Sense and Sensibility	Won
Boston Society of Film Critics	Best Film	2005	Brokeback Mountain	Won
Boston Society of Film Critics	Best Foreign language film	2000	Crouching Tiger, Hidden Dragon	Won
Toronto Film Critics Association	Best Film	2000	Crouching Tiger, Hidden Dragon	Won
Chicago Film Critics Association	Best Director	1997	The Ice Storm	Nominated
Chicago Film Critics Association	Best Director	2000	Crouching Tiger, Hidden Dragon	Nominated
Chicago Film Critics Association	Best Director	2005	Brokeback Mountain	Nominated
Chicago Film Critics Association	Best Film	2000	Crouching Tiger, Hidden Dragon	Nominated
Chicago Film Critics Association	Best Film	2005	Brokeback Mountain	Nominated
Chicago Film Critics Association	Best Foreign Language Film	2000	Crouching Tiger, Hidden Dragon	Won
Florida Film Critics Circle	Best Foreign Language Film	2000	Crouching Tiger, Hidden Dragon	Won
Florida Film Critics Circle	Best Director	2005	Brokeback Mountain	Won
Florida Film Critics Circle	Best Film	2005	Brokeback Mountain	Won
Dallas-Fort Worth Film Critics Association	Best Film	2005	Brokeback Mountain	Won
Dallas-Fort Worth Film Critics Association	Best Director	2005	Brokeback Mountain	Won
Dallas-Fort Worth Film Critics Association	Best Foreign Language Film	2000	Crouching Tiger, Hidden Dragon	Won
Online Film Critics Society	Best Director	2000	Crouching Tiger, Hidden Dragon	Nominated
Online Film Critics Society	Best Director	2005	Brokeback Mountain	Nominated
Online Film Critics Society	Best Picture	2000	Crouching Tiger, Hidden Dragon	Nominated
Online Film Critics Society	Best Picture	2005	Brokeback Mountain	Nominated
Online Film Critics Society	Best Foreign Language Film	2000	Crouching Tiger, Hidden Dragon	Won
Vancouver Film Critics Circle	Best Film	2000	Crouching Tiger, Hidden Dragon	Nominated
Vancouver Film Critics Circle	Best Film	2005	Brokeback Mountain	Won
Vancouver Film Critics Circle	Best Director	2000	Crouching Tiger, Hidden Dragon	Nominated
Vancouver Film Critics Circle	Best Director	2005	Brokeback Mountain	Won
Vancouver Film Critics Circle	Best Director	2012	Life of Pi	Nominated
San Francisco Bay Area Film Critics Circle	Best Film	2005	Brokeback Mountain	Won
San Francisco Bay Area Film Critics Circle	Best Director	2005	Brokeback Mountain	Won
Satellite Awards	Best Director	2000	Crouching Tiger, Hidden Dragon	Nominated
Satellite Awards	Best Director	2005	Brokeback Mountain	Won
Satellite Awards	Best Director	2007	Lust, Caution	Nominated
Satellite Awards	Best Film	2005	Brokeback Mountain	Won
Satellite Awards	Best Film	2012	Life of Pi	Nominated
César Awards	Best Foreign Film	2007	Brokeback Mountain	Nominated
Bodil Awards	Best American Film	1999	The Ice Storm	Won
Bodil Awards	Best American Film	2006	Brokeback Mountain	Nominated
Bodil Awards	Best Non-American Film	2001	Crouching Tiger, Hidden Dragon	Won
David di Donatello	Best Foreign Film	2006	Brokeback Mountain	Nominated
David di Donatello	Best Foreign Film	2013	Life of Pi	Nominated

== Government orders and decorations ==
- Knight of the French Ordre des Arts et des Lettres (2012).
- Knight of the French highest honour Legion of Honor (2021)
