= Neil Peng =

Taiwanese screenwriter and political activist

- 馮光遠
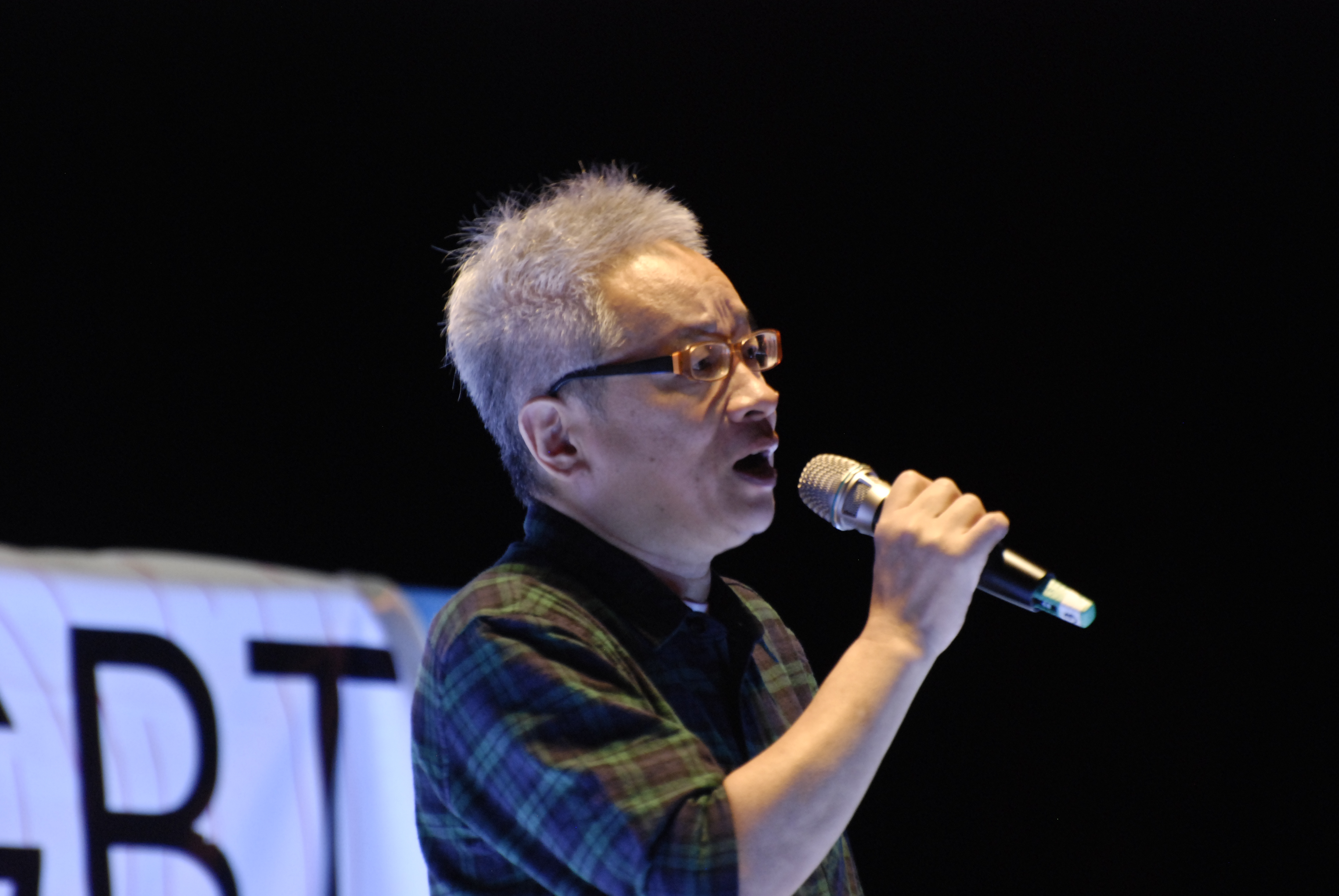
- Born: 23 September 1953 (age 72); Sanchong, Taipei County, Taiwan
- Education: Fu Jen Catholic University (BA); Fairfield University (MA)
- Political party: New Power Party (2015–17)
- Awards: Golden Horse Award for Best Original Screenplay (1993)

Neil Peng (Chinese: 馮光遠; pinyin: Féng Guāngyuǎn; born 23 September 1953) is a Taiwanese screenwriter and political activist.

== Early life and career ==
Peng was born in Sanchong, Taipei, and received his bachelor's degree in library science from Fu Jen Catholic University before obtaining his master's degree in mass communications from Fairfield University. He then served the China Times as deputy editor-in-chief.

== The Wedding Banquet (1993) ==
Peng approached director Ang Lee with the idea behind The Wedding Banquet in 1986 by revealing to Lee that one of their mutual friends had moved to the United States and was in a same-sex relationship without the knowledge of the man's parents. Lee and Peng began writing the screenplay two years later and were soon joined by James Schamus. Released in 1993, the film was entered into that year's Berlin Film Festival. Lee and Peng shared the 1993 Golden Horse Award for Best Original Screenplay for their collaboration on the film. In 1994, The Wedding Banquet was nominated for six Independent Spirit Awards.

== Political activism ==
In 2012, Peng announced his support of the anti-nuclear movement, later becoming a member of the Taiwan Environmental Protection Union. He is also known for his support of pension reform and same-sex marriage in Taiwan.

Peng has spoken out against the Cross-Strait Service Trade Agreement, by launching a petition against the pact's ratification in August 2013. Later that month, Peng and others founded the Constitution 133 Alliance to advocate for the recall of under-performing legislators. The group was named after Article 133 of the Constitution of the Republic of China, which allows constituents to recall their representatives to the Legislative Yuan. The Constitution 133 Alliance launched its first recall campaign against Kuomintang legislator Wu Yu-sheng in August, which was not successful. Though Peng claimed that the Central Election Commission had "stalled" Wu's recall, Peng continued to participate in future recall attempts, rebranded the Appendectomy Project and inspired by the Constitution 133 Alliance, against Wu, Alex Tsai, and Lin Hung-chih in particular. After the 2014 Sunflower Student Movement, proposals to strengthen submission requirements for legislative recall petitions were discussed, a move Peng opposed.

== Political career ==
In February 2014, Peng announced his independent Taipei mayoral campaign. Later that month, when Kuomintang candidate Sean Lien stated that he would take legal action against anyone who published falsehoods about him, Peng and Wellington Koo pledged to defend all who had been sued by Lien. Peng was scheduled to debate fellow independent Ko Wen-je in March shortly after a debate only open to Democratic Progressive Party candidates had been televised. Ko did not participate, and all DPP candidates, one of whom was Koo, debated Peng instead. Despite his absence from the March debates, Ko won the mayoral election.

Following Peng's loss in the mayoral election, he declared an independent legislative campaign for New Taipei 1 in February 2015. By April, he had joined the New Power Party. In September 2015, Peng was named to the NPP's executive committee for the first time. After contentious discussions with the DPP about supporting its legislative candidate Lu Sun-ling, Peng chose to drop out of the election in November 2015. In March 2016, Peng was reelected to the NPP's executive board. After the reelection of Huang Kuo-chang as head executive, Peng remarked that party leaders should not be legislators, so the party could better remain unaffected by government influence. This disagreement lead to Peng leaving the party in January 2017.

== Controversy ==
Peng has repeatedly made controversial statements. He was one of three people charged by Emile Sheng in 2012 for libel. Peng was jailed for 20 days over the comments. The case was appealed up to the Supreme Court in November 2016, which found the three defendants not guilty.

For saying that King Pu-tsung and Ma Ying-jeou have a "special/sexual relationship," King filed a lawsuit against Peng in February 2014, accusing Peng of libel. The Taiwan High Court ruled against King in March 2015, but King filed an appeal of the ruling in September. Following the appeal, the Civil Court determined that Peng should pay King NT$1 million in damages. Peng appealed the Civil Court decision and was again found not guilty for libel and defamation in May 2016, the second charge stemming from Peng's published article about King, some time after the March 2015 High Court ruling.

In May 2014, Peng was named a defendant in a court case involving legislator Lu Hsueh-chang.

== Personal ==
Peng lives in Daan District, Taipei.
