= Beilager =

Former marital ceremony in Germany

The term Beilager (in older writings Beylager), as well as the related terms Bettleite and Bettsetzung all refer to a ceremonial part of marriage as performed in German-speaking areas from the High Middle Ages to about the 19th century.

During Beilager, bride and groom were ritually covered in the marriage bed in a public ceremony. The process had legal force and therefore needed witnesses of the consummation of the marriage. In the oldest surviving Saxon law (Sachsenspiegel in 1220) it says: Er ist ihr Vormund und sie ist seine Genossin, und tritt in sein recht, wann si in sein Bett tritt (He is her legal guardian and she is his companion, and enters into his claim when she goes into his bed). A senior witness or relative (sometimes also a lawyer) established the consent of the couple, and then performed Muntehe, transitioning the guardianship of the woman from father to husband (similar to the Roman Manus marriage).

These royal nuptials were designed with appropriate pomp. The (pre-) marital intercourse, copula carnalis, (medieval Latin for fleshly connection, as noted in church records) was probably an original part of the Beilager ritual in the early Middle Ages. Descriptions of the 15th century describe the bride and groom getting dressed in the symbolic marriage bed, followed by the carnal union of the pair, without witnesses, on the wedding night, although some authors believe that in the 14th century intercourse took place in view of witnesses.

A special form of ritual Beilager, called keusches Beilager (chaste nuptials), involved a deputy or messenger of the groom carrying out the ritual nuptials in which a sword was placed between the bride and the groom's representative to symbolize the physical separation between the bride and her groom. The Abgesandtenwerbung survived to our time in the form of the so-called Handschuhehe (lit. glove marriage), which is not recognized legally in Germany.

== History ==
Hardly any descriptions of ritual Beilager as performed in the high Middle Ages have survived. It is presumed that it was so commonplace that it was not considered necessary to describe it. In the 14th and 15th century there are frequent reports of (usually royal) Beilager.

The religious influence on the ritual Beilager was limited, with the church blessing usually sought only after the wedding night. But there were variations: the royal nuptials Duke John Casimir (Saxe-Coburg) with Margaret of Brunswick-Lüneburg in 1599 in Coburg held the general superintendent Melchior Bischoff on ritual nuptials bed a short sermon titled: Christliche Ermahnung geschehen vor der Copulation am 16. Septembris (Christian exhortation happen before copulation on 16 Septembris). But the marriage blessing, he issued until the following day after the wedding night.

The public rite of Bettleite, similar to the late medieval symbolic Beilager, was practiced in the Baltic Sea area until the 19th century. Public weddings, celebrated by a priest, were not compulsory for Catholics until the Council of Trent (1545 - 1563, Session XXIV, Tametsi decree). The Reformation had no direct effect on the practice of public Bettleite or Beilager.

== See also ==
- Bedding ceremony

== Bibliography ==
- Jörg Wettlaufer: Beilager und Bettleite im Ostseeraum (13. bis 19. Jahrhundert). Eine vergleichende Studie zum Wandel von Recht und Brauchtum der Eheschließung, Diss. Kiel, 1999
- Irene Erfen, Karl-Heinz Spiess: Unterwegs zu einem fremden Ehemann; Brautfahrt und Ehe in europäischen Fürstenhäusern in: Fremdheit, Francia, Forschungen zur westeuropäischen Geschichte, Stuttgart, 1997
