= Tim Squyres =

American film editor

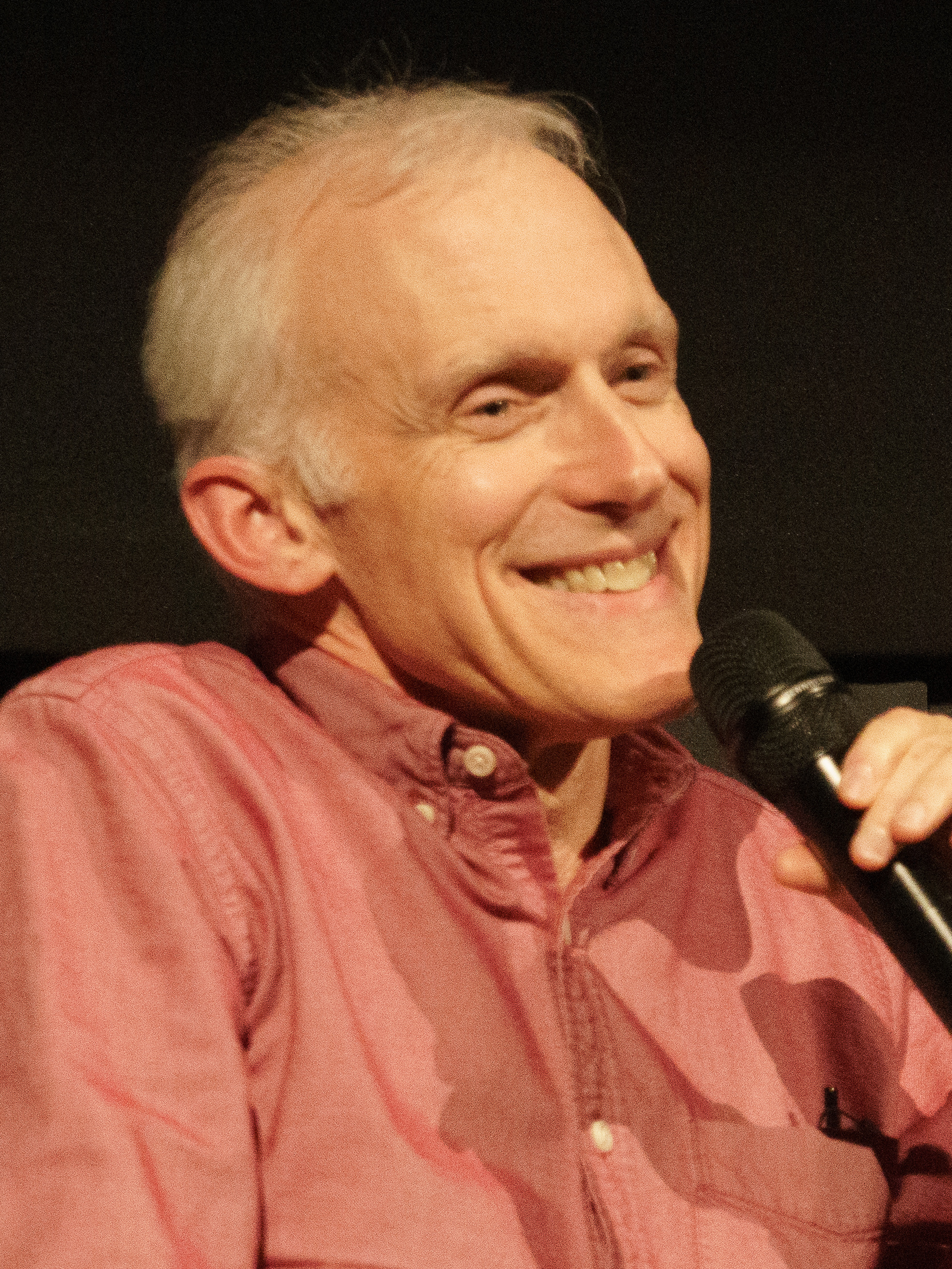
- Squyres in 2025
- Born: 29 March 1959 (age 67); Wenonah, New Jersey, U.S.
- Occupation: Film editor

Timothy S. Squyres is an American film editor with about 30 film credits. Squyres has had an extended collaboration with the Taiwanese director Ang Lee. His latest collaboration with Jonathan Demme on the film A Master Builder opened in New York during June 2014 and was based on the 19th century play by Henrik Ibsen.

== Life and career ==
Squyres was born in Wenonah, New Jersey. He is the brother of Steve Squyres, a retired professor of astronomy at Cornell University and Chief Scientist at Blue Origin. Both brothers attended Cornell after attending Gateway Regional High School in New Jersey.

Squyres has edited all of Ang Lee's films except for Brokeback Mountain, including The Wedding Banquet (1993), Eat Drink Man Woman (1994), Sense and Sensibility (1995), Ride with the Devil (1999), Crouching Tiger, Hidden Dragon (2000), The Hire: Chosen (2001), Hulk (2003), Lust, Caution (2007), Taking Woodstock (2009), Life of Pi (2012), and Gemini Man (2019). Squyres served as editor of Angelina Jolie's adaptation of Unbroken, released on December 25, 2014.

Squyres' work on Crouching Tiger, Hidden Dragon (2000) earned nominations for the Academy Award for Best Film Editing, the BAFTA Award for Best Editing, the American Cinema Editors Eddie Award, among other awards. His work on Gosford Park (directed by Robert Altman – 2001) was also nominated for an Eddie. In 2012, he was also nominated for the Academy Award for Life of Pi.

Squyres has been elected to membership in the American Cinema Editors.

Squyres is a resident of Maplewood, New Jersey.

== Filmography ==
Year	Title	Notes
1991	Blowback	
1991	Trump: What's the Deal?	
1991	Pushing Hands	
1993	The Wedding Banquet	
1994	Eat Drink Man Woman	
1994	Scenes from the New World	
1995	ABC Weekend Special	1 episode
1995	Sense and Sensibility	
1997	The Ice Storm	
1997	Remember WENN	1 episode
1998	Moyers on Addiction: Close to Home	Miniseries
1998	Lulu on the Bridge	
1999	Ride with the Devil	
1999	Now and Again	1 episode
2000	Crouching Tiger, Hidden Dragon	
2001	Chosen	Short film
2001	Gosford Park	
2003	Hulk	
2004	Going Upriver	
2005	Medium	
2005	Syriana	
2007	The Inner Life of Martin Frost	
2007	Lust, Caution	
2008	Rachel Getting Married	
2009	Taking Woodstock	
2009	Nurse Jackie	1 episode
2010	The Wonderful Maladys	Television film
2012	Life of Pi	
2013	The Armstrong Lie	
2013	A Master Builder	
2014	Winter's Tale	
2014	Unbroken	
2016	Billy Lynn's Long Halftime Walk	
2019	The Red Sea Diving Resort	
2019	Gemini Man	
2021	This Body is So Impermanent	
2022	Deep Water	
2022	The Mission	Short film
2026	Mike & Nick & Nick & Alice	
TBA	Gold Mountain	

== See also ==
- List of film director and editor collaborations
