= Pushing Hands (film) =

1991 comedy-drama film by Ang Lee

- Taiwanese DVD cover
- Traditional Chinese: 推手
- Hanyu Pinyin: Tuī Shǒu
- Directed by: Ang Lee
- Written by: Ang Lee; James Schamus
- Produced by: Emily Yi-ming Liu; Feng Chyt Jiang
- Starring: Sihung Lung; Lai Wang; Bo Z. Wang; Deb Snyder; Haan Lee
- Cinematography: Jong Lin
- Edited by: Ang Lee; Tim Squyres
- Music by: Tai-An Hsu; Xiao-Song Qu
- Production companies: Central Motion Pictures; Ang Lee Productions
- Distributed by: Central Motion Pictures (Taiwan); Cinépix Film Properties (United States)
- Release dates: December 7, 1991 (Taiwan); April 1992 (WorldFest Houston)
- Running time: 105 minutes
- Countries: Taiwan; United States
- Languages: Mandarin; English

Pushing Hands (Chinese: 推手; pinyin: Tuī Shǒu) is a 1991 comedy-drama film directed by Taiwanese filmmaker Ang Lee, his feature directorial debut. It stars Sihung Lung as a Chinese tai chi master living in New York, who struggles to find his place in the world. The film shows the contrast between traditional Chinese ideas of Confucian relationships within a family and the much more informal Western emphasis on the individual. Together with Ang Lee's two following films, The Wedding Banquet (1993) and Eat Drink Man Woman (1994), it forms his "Father Knows Best" trilogy, each of which deals with conflicts between an older and more traditional generation and their children as they confront a world of change.

The Taiwanese-American co-production was produced independently by Lee and Ted Hope, and features several of Lee's frequent collaborators, including screenwriter James Schamus and editor Tim Squyres. It was released theatrically in Taiwan, but did not see a wide release in the United States for several years, after the success of The Wedding Banquet and Eat Drink Man Woman. It was critically well-received, and earned several accolades, including three Golden Horse Awards.

== Plot ==
The story begins with the Chinese tai chi master, Chu, immigrating to the United States to live with his son, Alex, and his family. Due to Chu's inability to speak English and his American daughter-in-law, Martha's, lack of Mandarin proficiency, communication between them is nearly impossible. They rely on Alex, who is bilingual, to serve as an interpreter. Martha finds Chu's presence disruptive, as his daily routine interferes with her writing of her second novel. Chu teaches tai chi classes at the local Chinese cultural center on Sundays, where he meets Mrs. Chen, another Beijing immigrant who teaches cooking.

The narrative depicts the conflict between Chu and Martha, as well as Alex's struggle between filial duty and practical responsibilities. One evening, while Alex is out, Chu goes for a walk against Martha's wishes, triggering a family crisis. Subsequently, Chu moves out of the house to live independently. He finds a job as a dishwasher in a small Chinatown apartment but faces discrimination from the owner. Using his tai chi skills, Chu defends himself during a confrontation with the owner, earning respect from others.

The story concludes with Alex realizing his misunderstandings about his father and attempting to reconcile. Despite Chu's insistence on living alone, Alex expresses his love and hopes for him to visit regularly and see his grandson. Ultimately, Chu and Mrs. Chen continue their lives in Chinatown, pursuing freedom and independence.

== Cast ==
- Sihung Lung as Mr. Chu (Chinese: 朱老; pinyin: Zhū-lǎo), a tai chi master who travels to the United States.
- Bo Z. Wang as Alex Chu (traditional Chinese: 朱曉生; simplified Chinese: 朱晓生; pinyin: Zhū Xiǎoshēng), Chu's son. He acts as an interpreter between Mr. Chu and Martha, but he deliberately mistranslates to reduce tensions between the two parties.
- Deb Snyder as Martha Chu (瑪莎; 玛莎; Mǎshā), Alex's European American wife. Martha does not speak or understand Chinese.
- Wang Lai as Mrs. Chen (陳太太; 陈太太; Chén-tàitai), a widow who is a cooking instructor at the area Chinese community center.
- Haan Lee as Jeremy Chu (吉米; Jímǐ), Alex and Martha's son.
- Fanny De Luz as Linda (琳達; 琳达; Líndá), Martha's friend.
- Hung-Chang Wang as Boss Huang, the owner of a Chinatown restaurant where Chu ends up working.
- Emily Yi-Ming Liu as Chen Yi-quan, Mrs. Chen's adult daughter.

== Title ==
The title of the film refers to the pushing hands training that is part of the grandfather's tai chi routine. Pushing hands is a two-person training which teaches tai chi students to yield in the face of brute force. Tai chi teachers were persecuted in China during the Cultural Revolution, and the grandfather's family was broken up as a result. He sent his son to the West several years earlier and when he could he came to live with his family with the expectation of picking up where they left off, but he was unprepared for the very different atmosphere of the West. "Pushing Hands" thereby alludes to the process of adaptation to culture shock felt by a traditional teacher in moving to the United States.

== Production ==
=== Development ===
Taiwanese-born filmmaker Ang Lee had graduated from New York University Tisch School of the Arts in 1984, but had failed to find career opportunities since, working almost full-time as a house-father. During the intermediate six years, he became interested in martial arts, specifically tai chi, after reading the wuxia novel Jianghu qixia zhuan (The Story of an Extraordinary Gallant Errant). Lee first developed the idea of a film about an old man and old woman falling in love in front of their children, but did not start writing the script until he learned of a script competition being held by the Government Information Office of Taiwan. Lee began writing in February 1990, while practicing tai chi at a nearby community college. At the end of March, the script for Pushing Hands was submitted along with the one for The Wedding Banquet, which he had already written. His scripts came in first and second, respectively.

The winning screenplays brought Lee to the attention of Hsu Li-kong, a recently promoted senior manager in a major studio who had a strong interest in Lee's unique style and freshness. Hsu, a first-time producer, invited Lee to direct Pushing Hands. The film was financed by the Taiwanese production company Central Motion Pictures, who also handled the film's domestic release. Lee hired Ted Hope and James Schamus of Good Machine to act as the U.S. production coordinator. Due to concerns about the international market and the American character, Ang asked Schamus to help rewrite the script.

=== Casting ===
The leading role of Mr. Chu was played by Sihung Lung, a veteran Taiwanese film, TV, and stage actor. At the time of his casting, he had already retired from acting, but enjoyed the script so much he came out of retirement to star in it. He would become one of Lee's frequent collaborators, subsequently starring in The Wedding Banquet, Eat Drink Man Woman (where he also played a character named Chu), and Crouching Tiger, Hidden Dragon.

=== Filming ===
Good Machine initially estimated that the filming period of the film would be three weeks, but under Lee's insistence, Schamus and Hope changed the shooting period to four weeks. Before filming began, the crew spent two weeks setting and rehearsing. On the day of the shooting, the crew set up a table and incense, and held a gong ceremony, a practice Lee would continue into his future projects.

The film was shot entirely on-location in New York City, making it the first Taiwanese film to be shot entirely in the United States. The Chu residence was a house located in the North Riverdale sub-neighborhood of The Bronx. Ang requested that the house have very large windows in order to photograph the interior from the outside. Because the house did not have any furniture, the crew transported furniture from Manhattan, but Ang was not satisfied. Ang moved his own furniture onto the set, which was later destroyed in the scene where Alex trashes the kitchen. Some of the paintings used as props in the house were donated to the production by Ang's artist friend. During production, one such painting was stolen.

The scenes set in the jail were filmed at a detention center in Yonkers. During the filming process, many overseas Chinese students studying in the United States enthusiastically assisted the crew.

== Reception ==
The film was critically acclaimed in both Taiwan and the United States. Donald Lyons wrote that Lee's filming style displayed "a mastery of the visual dynamics of interior spaces and their psychic pressures."

== Accolades ==
Award	Category	Nominee	Result
Golden Horse Film Festival and Awards	Best Feature Film	—N/a	Nominated
Golden Horse Film Festival and Awards	Best Director	Ang Lee	Nominated
Golden Horse Film Festival and Awards	Best Leading Actor	Sihung Lung	Won
Golden Horse Film Festival and Awards	Best Supporting Actress	Wang Lai	Won
Golden Horse Film Festival and Awards	Best Original Screenplay	Ang Lee	Nominated
Golden Horse Film Festival and Awards	Best Cinematography	Jong Lin	Nominated
Golden Horse Film Festival and Awards	Best Film Editing	Ang Lee	Nominated
Golden Horse Film Festival and Awards	Best Original Film Score	Tai-An Hsu	Nominated
Golden Horse Film Festival and Awards	Best Sound Recording	Chih-Cheng Wang	Nominated
Golden Horse Film Festival and Awards	Special Jury Award	Central Motion Pictures	Won
Asia-Pacific Film Festival	Best Film	Ang Lee	Won
Amiens International Film Festival	Best First Film	Ang Lee	Won
WorldFest-Houston International Film Festival	Gold Remi	Ang Lee	Won

== General and cited references ==
- Dariotis, Wei Ming; Eileen Fung (1997). "Chapter 7: Breaking the Soy Sauce Jar: Diaspora and Displacement in the Films of Ang Lee". In Lu, Sheldon Hsiao-peng (Xiaopeng) (ed.). Transnational Chinese Cinemas: Identity, Nationhood, Gender. Honolulu, HI: University of Hawaii. pp. 187–220). ISBN 9780824818456. JSTOR j.ctt6wqxw6. OCLC 45728411. Via the Internet Archive (subscription required).
