= Eat Drink Man Woman =

1994 comedy-drama film by Ang Lee

- Theatrical release poster

Chinese name
- Traditional Chinese: 飲食男女
- Simplified Chinese: 饮食男女
Transcriptions
Standard Mandarin
- Hanyu Pinyin: Yǐn shí nán nǚ
- Directed by: Ang Lee
- Written by: Ang Lee; James Schamus; Hui-Ling Wang
- Produced by: Hsu Li-kong; Hsu Kong
- Starring: Sihung Lung (Note: Sihung Lung was credited as Lang Hsiung.); Kuei-mei Yang; Chien-lien Wu; Yu-wen Wang; Winston Chao; Ah-Leh Gua; Sylvia Chang
- Cinematography: Jong Lin
- Edited by: Ang Lee; Tim Squyres
- Music by: Thierry Mader Schollhammer
- Production companies: Ang Lee Pictures; Central Motion Pictures; Good Machine; Xiongfa Film Company
- Distributed by: Central Motion Pictures (Taiwan); The Samuel Goldwyn Company (United States)
- Release dates: July 2, 1994 (Taiwan); August 3, 1994 (United States)
- Running time: 123 minutes
- Countries: Taiwan; United States
- Language: Mandarin
- Box office: $24.2 million

Eat Drink Man Woman (Chinese: 飲食男女) is a 1994 comedy-drama film directed by Ang Lee, from a script co-written with James Schamus and Hui-Ling Wang. It stars Sihung Lung, Wang Yu-wen, Wu Chien-lien, and Yang Kuei-mei as members of the Zhu family navigating the challenges of love, life, tradition and family. Part of Lee's "Father Knows Best" trilogy and similar to Lee's other works, this film deals with the transition from tradition to modernity. It is Lee's only film, to date, to be shot entirely in his native Taiwan.

The film premiered in Taiwan on July 2, 1994, and it was both a critical and box office success. It received several accolades including an Academy Award nomination for Best Foreign Language Film. It was also nominated for both a Golden Globe and BAFTA Award, as well as three Golden Horse Awards and six Independent Spirit Awards. It would inspire films like Tortilla Soup and Joyful Reunion and has an eponymous musical rendition. A BBC Culture poll of film critics ranked the film at number 54 of the 100 Greatest Non-English Language Films.

The title is a quote from the Book of Rites, one of the Confucian classics, referring to the basic human desires and accepting them as natural. The beginning of the quote reads as follows: “The things which men greatly desire are comprehended in food and drink and sexual pleasure.” (Note: Chinese:「飲食男女，人之大欲存焉」)

== Plot ==
On a Sunday afternoon in Taipei, semi-retired chef and widower Zhu prepares a feast for his three daughters. Jia-Jen, the eldest, is a chemistry teacher who devotes her life to Christianity and has become emotionally guarded long after a heartbreak in her college years. The second daughter, Jia-Chien, is a successful and busy executive at an airline company. She retains a suppressed passion for cooking that her father discouraged in her formative years. Jia-Ning, the youngest, is a college student who works part-time at a Wendy's fast food restaurant.

At dinner, Jia-Chien announces that she has invested in a new apartment and will be moving out once construction is complete. Surprisingly, Mr. Zhu approves. Jia-Chien criticizes her father's cooking, saying Mr. Zhu's taste is deteriorating. Mr. Zhu dismisses the idea before suddenly rushing off to help his (and Jia-Chien's) long-time friend and "taster", Old Wen, at a banquet. Afterwards, Mr. Zhu wonders with Old Wen if there is anything more to life than eating, drinking, man, and woman. Meanwhile, family friend Jin-Rong stops by the Zhu residence with her daughter Shan-Shan. Jin-Rong vocalizes her difficulties with a messy divorce while being responsible for work, Shan-Shan, and her opinionated mother, Madame Liang, as she returns to Taipei from America. Jia-Jen comforts her while Shan-Shan colors a caricature of Mr. Zhu.

The next morning, Mr. Zhu meets Shan-Shan, learns that the lunches Jin-Rong provides her are suboptimal, and decides to cook for her. Shan-Shan agrees, letting Mr. Zhu eat the lunches her mom made to prevent her from discovering their secret. At school, Jia-Jen meets the new volleyball coach Ming-Dao and they take interest in one another. Jia-Chien meets the chief negotiator Li Kai during a meeting at work and they flirt with one another. She has a chance to relocate to Amsterdam due to a potential promotion. Jia-Ning meets up with Guo-Lun, her friend Rachel's on-and-off boyfriend. As Guo-Lun mopes about his unrequited love, Jia-Ning comforts him, telling him that true love is being with someone he can express his feelings to comfortably, leading Guo-Lun to realize his love for Jia-Ning.

Meanwhile, Old Wen becomes hospitalized. Jia-Jen is fooled by love letters she believes are from Ming-Dao, falling for a prank by her students. Jia-Chien's apartment investment falls through as she discovers that the apartment company went bankrupt and ran away with her savings. She also learns that it was Li Kai who broke Jia-Jen's heart in college and confronts him about it. Li Kai says he never dated Jia-Jen. Jia-Ning faces a dilemma when she begins dating Guo-Lun even after Rachel confesses that she loves him. Mr. Zhu's health deteriorates and secretly visits the hospital, unaware that Jia-Chien saw him while visiting Old Wen. Eventually, Old Wen passes away and Mr. Zhu concludes that his sense of taste has officially departed.

At another Sunday feast, Jia-Chien announces that she will no longer be moving out; Mr. Zhu tells her not to worry. Later, Jia-Ning reveals her relationship with Guo-Lun and her pregnancy. The next dinner, Jia-Jen divulges that she and Ming-Dao have eloped. Jia-Jen and Jia-Ning move out of the residence, leaving Mr. Zhu with Jia-Chien. Troubled, Mr. Zhu begins to confide in and meet Madame Liang, leading the daughters to believe that the two are romantically involved.

Worried about her father's health, Jia-Chien rejects her promotion. Soon, the sisters, their partners, and Jin-Rong's family gather for a large Sunday feast. Mr. Zhu announces his engagement, not to Madame Liang, but to Jin-Rong, also revealing that his visit to the hospital was to show good health to gain Madame Liang's blessing. Madame Liang goes into shock, abruptly ending the dinner. Later, Jia-Ning and Guo-Lun have their baby, Jia-Jen converts Ming-Dao to Christianity, and Mr. Zhu sells the family home and buys a condo with Jin-Rong and Shan-Shan. Jia-Chien, no longer needing to take care of her father, accepts the job in Amsterdam. Before she leaves she prepares a final feast for the family in the family home, but only Mr. Zhu arrives. When Mr. Zhu tastes her cooking he suddenly realizes that his sense of taste has returned. The two hold each other's hands in the dining room, and call each other “Father” and “Daughter”.

== Cast ==
- Lung Sihung as Zhu (Chinese: 老朱; pinyin: Lǎo Zhū; lit. 'Old Zhu'), an aging master Chinese chef who works at Grand Hotel in Taipei and the widower father of three adult daughters.
- Yang Kuei-mei as Zhu Jia-Jen (朱家珍; Zhū Jiāzhēn), the eldest daughter, who works as a high school chemistry teacher. Ultimately she marries a new boyfriend after being abstinent for nine years. Her family members seem puzzled when they realize he is not a Christian but Jia-Jen says "He will be."
- Wu Chien-lien as Zhu Jia-Chien (朱家倩; Zhū Jiāqiàn), the second daughter, an executive at an airline company. Unlike her elder sister, Jia-Chien is sexually liberated, and suspects she disapproves of her moral system.
  - Chien-lien Wu, who plays Jia-Chien, also portrays Mr. Chu's dead wife. Lizzie Francke wrote that Jia-Chien taking the role of the cook "makes manifest the various needs that bind a family by setting a mother back at the heart of it". Dariotis and Fung wrote that therefore the phrase from Francke has multiple meanings since Jia-Chien takes her father's role of being a chef and therefore "is trying to be the son her father never had" and she takes the role of the mother.
- Wang Yu-wen as Zhu Jia-Ning (朱家寧; Zhū Jiāníng), the youngest daughter, who works at Wendy's fast food restaurant. She becomes involved with an on-and-off boyfriend of her friend Rachel and gets into a love triangle.
- Winston Chao as Li Kai (李凱; Lǐ Kǎi), Jia-Chien's co-worker and love interest. She believes that Li Kai broke Jia-Jen's heart, and Dariotis and Fung wrote that the event seems to have caused Jia-Jen to turn away from the world. Later in the film it is revealed that Jia-Jen fabricated the story, in order to "create a barrier against intimacy—even with her family" according to Dariotis and Fung.
- Sylvia Chang as Liang Jin-Rong (梁錦榮; Liáng Jǐnróng), a single mother and neighbour of Chu's, going through a messy divorce.
- Gua Ah-leh as Madame Liang (梁伯母; Liáng bómǔ), Jin-Rong's mother who has recently moved back to Taiwan from the United States.
- Chen Chao-jung as Guo Lun (國倫; Guólún), Rachel's ex-boyfriend and eventually Jia-Ning's love interest.
- Lu Chin-cheng as Ming-Dao, the high school volleyball coach whom Jia-Jen falls in love with.
- Lester Chit-Man Chan as Raymond (雷蒙; Léiméng), Jia-Chien's ex-boyfriend.
- Yu Chen (陳妤; Chén Yú) as Rachel (小芝芝; Xiǎo Zhīzhī), Jia-Ning's friend and co-worker.
- Tang Yu-Chien (唐語謙; Táng Yǔqiān) as Shan-Shan (珊珊; Shānshān), Jin-Rong's six-year-old daughter.
- Wang Jui as Old Wen (老溫; Lǎo Wēn), Chu's longtime friend and fellow chef.
- Hsu Gin-Ming as Coach Chai
- Lin Huel-Yi as Sister Chang

== Themes ==
Wei Ming Dariotis and Eileen Fung, authors of "Breaking the Soy Sauce Jar: Diaspora and Displacement in the Films of Ang Lee", wrote that Jia-Jen's story is that of a "spinster turned sensual woman". They wrote that her Christianity was there "perhaps to match her role as a mother-figure". She suspects Jia-Chien of disapproving of her moral system. Dariotis and Fung wrote that after Jia-Chien states that she needs not a mother but sister, Jia-Jen "is able to become who she really is with all the complexity that entails" rather than being someone she believed her family needed, with "who she really is" being "a modern, conservative, Christian, sexually aggressive Taiwanese woman". Desson Howe of The Washington Post wrote that of the actresses, Yang was the "most memorable".

Dariotis and Fung wrote that Jia-Ning's story is of "naïveté and immature love" and that the love triangle involving her, Guo Lun, and Rachel "is in many ways a parody of comic book romance." Dariotis and Fung argue that Jia-Ning's story, along with Jia-Jen's, is "not only flat but also dangerously uncomplicated." They further state that "[t]he lack of inquiry is endemic of this storyline" and that its "superficial treatment" is "quite disturbing."

“Due to love and traditional matters, they have to obey, they have to care well. They’re not really level with each other. I think that’s the biggest problem in that family, so the food and that banquet in the movie has become a ritual,” said Ang Lee. The banquet becomes a burden on the family.

The authors Hong Zhao and Haixin Jin argue in their article 破坏中的重建与传承——《饮食男女》解读 that in the film Eat Drink Man Woman, Zhu's family first maintains a semblance of calm when everyone represses their desires, then, the family is destructed when members throw off the shackles of their family roles to pursue their own desires. The family structure is eventually reconstructed when everyone's desire for eat, drink and sex is well balanced. At the beginning of the film, Zhu's family struggles between maintaining the banquet (eat and drink) and their sexual desire (man and woman). Food is the bond that holds the family together. However, though they dine together every week, they are afraid to confide in each other. When they focus on “eat drink” but suppress sexual desire, the family is unhappy. No one enjoys the meal and Zhu even loses his sense of taste. When Zhu, Jia Jen, and Jia Ning chase after their sexual desires (man and woman), the original family structure disintegrates, but the family becomes happier since everyone gets what they want. The desire for food and sex eventually reach a balance and Zhu's sense of taste is back at this moment.

Each character in this film has their own desire but at the beginning of the film, due to the concern with their family roles, they cannot express themselves.

== Production ==
Eat Drink Man Woman was filmed on-location in director Ang Lee's hometown Taipei. As of 2022, it is Lee's only film to be shot entirely in Taiwan.

The opening sequence - in which a Sunday lunch is lovingly prepared - took over a week to film and was accomplished with the use of an actual master chef, who doubled for actor Sihung Lung.

== Music ==
The musical score was composed by French musician Thierry Schollhammer, credited under the mononym "Mader", and arranged by Sarah Plant. The soundtrack was released by Varèse Sarabande.

=== Track listing ===
No.	Title	Artist(s)	Length
1	Awake	Mader	2:32
2	Good Morning, My Life!	Mader	1:12
3	Mambo City	Mader	10:53
4	The Daughters Heart - I	Mader	4:08
5	Night Moon	Mader	2:41
6	Destiny	Mader	1:54
7	Pas Kitchen - I	Mader	1:09
8	Emptiness	Mader	0:58
9	Up Or Down	Mader	0:24
10	Pas Kitchen - II	Mader	1:40
11	Loneliness	Mader	0:34
12	The Banquet	Mader	1:54
13	Pas Secret	Mader	0:46
14	Whos With Me	Mader	3:33
15	Kitchen Impro	Mader	1:33
16	Darkroom	Mader	0:40
17	Revelation	Mader	0:47
18	The Daughters Heart - II	Mader	4:08

Included in the film but not on the soundtrack, are several Mandopop tracks and classical excerpts from "Israel in Egypt", "All Creatures of Our God and King", and "Quattro pezzi sacri."

== Reception ==
=== Box office ===
The film grossed $24.2 million worldwide generating the third biggest percentage return on cost of films released in the year, behind Four Weddings and a Funeral and The Lion King. It was the highest-grossing foreign-language film in the United States and Canada for the year with a gross of $7.3 million.

=== Critical response ===
In her review in The New York Times, Janet Maslin praised Ang Lee as "a warmly engaging storyteller". She wrote, "Wonderfully seductive, and nicely knowing about all of its characters' appetites, Eat Drink Man Woman makes for an uncomplicatedly pleasant experience".

In his review in The Washington Post, Hal Hinson called the film a "beautiful balance of elements ... mellow, harmonious and poignantly funny". Hinson concluded:

As the relationships evolve and deepen, there seems to be a surprise around every corner—for both the characters and the audience. But what is most surprising, perhaps, is how involved we become with these people. As satisfying as food can be, the fullness we feel at the end here is far richer and more complex than that offered by the most extravagant meal. “ Eat Drink Man Woman” is a delicacy but also something more—something like food for the heart.

According to the review aggregator website Rotten Tomatoes, 88% of critics have given the film a positive review based on 49 reviews. The site's critics consensus reads, "A richly layered look at the complex interactions between a widowed chef and his daughters, Ang Lee's generational comedy Eat Drink Man Woman offers filmgoers a tasty cinematic treat." On Metacritic, the film has a weighted average score of 80 out of 100, based on 29 critics, indicating "generally favorable reviews".

=== Awards and nominations ===
Award	Category	Recipient	Result
Academy Awards	Best Foreign Language Film	—N/a	Nominated
Asia Pacific Film Festival	Best Film	Ang Lee	Won
Asia Pacific Film Festival	Best Film Editing	Tim Squyres	Won
BAFTA Awards	Best Film Not in the English Language	—N/a	Nominated
Dallas–Fort Worth Film Critics Association Awards	Best Foreign Language Films	—N/a	Nominated
Golden Globe Awards	Best Foreign Language Film	—N/a	Nominated
Golden Horse Film Awards	Best Feature Film	—N/a	Nominated
Golden Horse Film Awards	Best Supporting Actress	Gua Ah-leh	Nominated
Golden Horse Film Awards	Best Original Screenplay	Ang Lee, Wang Hui-ling, James Schamus	Nominated
National Board of Review	Best Foreign Language Film	—N/a	Won
National Board of Review	Top Foreign Films	—N/a	Won
Independent Spirit Awards	Best Feature	Hsu Li-kong, Ted Hope, James Schamus	Nominated
Independent Spirit Awards	Best Director	Ang Lee	Nominated
Independent Spirit Awards	Best Male Lead	Sihung Lung	Nominated
Independent Spirit Awards	Best Female Lead	Wu Chien-lien	Nominated
Independent Spirit Awards	Best Screenplay	Ang Lee, Wang Hui-ling, James Schamus	Nominated
Independent Spirit Awards	Best Cinematography	Jong Lin	Nominated

== Legacy ==
Tortilla Soup, a 2001 American comedy-drama film directed by Maria Ripoll, is based on Eat Drink Man Woman. A semi-sequel, Eat Drink Man Woman 2012 [饮食男女2012] (billed as Joyful Reunion in English) was released, with Jui-Yuan Tsao, producer for the original film, serving as director, and a new set of characters exploring similar themes.

The film was adapted off-screen as well. In 2019, produced by PerfectMatch Theatre co., LTD, the National Kaohsiung Centre for the Arts put on a musical production titled, Eat Drink Man Woman: The Musical. The musical is a direct adaptation of the film. With a total runtime of 160 minutes, the production strived to showcase as many iconic aspects from Ang Lee's film, such as the character's unique qualities and the beauty of food, through song and dance as possible. Unfortunately, the musical only ran for a recorded three days in September 2019; the production had a total of one night showing and two matinees.

== Father Knows Best trilogy ==
Eat Drink Man Woman is Ang Lee's third feature film and forms the final part of his ‘Father Knows Best’ Trilogy, following Pushing Hands (1991) and The Wedding Banquet (1993). All three films depict a clash between cultures like youth and old age, tradition and progress, east and west, and investigate the freedoms and constraints inherent in family structures particularly those between fathers, daughters and sons. Si-hung Lung takes the place of a father in all three films - here as Mr. Zhu, a retired master chef - and He had used it as the motif (idealization of the household's head) to resolve all the contradictions and conflict that happened within the family members. The trilogy also takes the repression of individual desire in the face of social pressure as one of its central themes.

== See also ==
- List of submissions to the 67th Academy Awards for Best Foreign Language Film
- List of Taiwanese submissions for the Academy Award for Best Foreign Language Film

== Bibliography ==
- Vick, Tom (2008). Asian Cinema: A Field Guide. New York: Harper Perennial. ISBN 978-0061145858.
- Dariotis, Wei Ming and Eileen Fung. "Breaking the Soy Sauce Jar: Diaspora and Displacement in the Films of Ang Lee." in: Lu, Sheldon Hsiao-peng (Xiaopeng) (editor). Transnational Chinese Cinemas: Identity, Nationhood, Gender. University of Hawaii Press, 1 January 1997. ISBN 0824818458, 9780824818456.
