= The Wedding Banquet =

1993 romantic-comedy film by Ang Lee

- Theatrical release poster

Chinese name
- Chinese: 喜宴
Transcriptions
Standard Mandarin
- Hanyu Pinyin: Xǐyàn
- Wade–Giles: Hsi3 yen4
- Directed by: Ang Lee
- Written by: Ang Lee; Neil Peng; James Schamus
- Produced by: Ang Lee; Ted Hope; James Schamus
- Starring: Gua Ah-leh; Lung Sihung; May Chin; Winston Chao; Mitchell Lichtenstein
- Cinematography: Jong Lin
- Edited by: Tim Squyres
- Music by: Thierry Schollhammer; Chosei Funahara
- Production companies: Good Machine; Central Motion Picture Corporation
- Distributed by: Central Motion Picture Corporation (Taiwan); The Samuel Goldwyn Company (U.S.)
- Release dates: February 1993 (Berlin); 5 March 1993 (Taiwan); 4 August 1993 (U.S.)
- Running time: 106 minutes
- Countries: Taiwan; United States
- Languages: Mandarin; English
- Budget: $1 million
- Box office: $23.6 million

The Wedding Banquet is a 1993 romantic comedy film directed, produced and co-written by Ang Lee. The story concerns a gay Taiwanese immigrant man (Winston Chao, in his film debut) who marries a mainland Chinese woman (May Chin) to placate his parents (Gua Ah-leh and Lung Sihung) and get her a green card. His plan backfires when his parents arrive in the United States to plan his wedding banquet and he has to hide the truth of his gay partner (Mitchell Lichtenstein). It was a co-production of Lee's Good Machine production company, and the Taiwanese Central Motion Picture Corporation.

Lee's second feature film and his first to get a theatrical release in the United States, The Wedding Banquet premiered at the 43rd Berlin International Film Festival, where it won the Golden Bear. It was both a critical and commercial success and won five Golden Horse Awards, including Best Film and Best Director. It received Oscar and Golden Globe nominations for Best Foreign-Language Film, as well as six Independent Spirit Award nominations.

Together with Pushing Hands (1991) and Eat Drink Man Woman (1994), all showing the Confucian family at risk, and all starring the Taiwanese actor Lung Sihung, The Wedding Banquet forms what has been called Lee's "Father Knows Best" trilogy.

In 2023, the film was selected for preservation in the United States National Film Registry by the Library of Congress as being "culturally, historically, or aesthetically significant".

A remake of the same name was released on April 18, 2025.

== Plot ==
Gao Wai-Tung is a gay Taiwanese immigrant happily living in Manhattan with his gay Jewish partner Simon. He has not come out to his traditional parents who live back in Taiwan. Since he is in his late 20s, his parents have become eager to see him married with a child to continue the family line. When his parents hire a dating service, Wai-Tung and Simon invent impossible demands that the candidate date must be Chinese, an opera singer, 5'9" in height, have two PhDs, and speak five languages. To their shock, the service actually locates a 5'8" Chinese woman who meets all but one of their qualifications, having only a single PhD. She is very gracious when Wai-Tung explains his dilemma, as she too is hiding a relationship with a white man from her parents.

At Simon's prodding to solve the problem, Wai-Tung decides to marry one of his female tenants, Wei-Wei, a penniless artist from mainland China in need of a green card. Besides helping Wei-Wei, the couple hope that this will placate Wai-Tung's parents. To unexpectedly complicate matters, upon learning of their son’s "engagement", Mr. and Mrs. Gao announce they will visit. Before the parents arrive, Simon instructs Wei-Wei on everything she needs to know about Wai-Tung's habits, body, and lifestyle. They hastily take down all gay imagery and décor from the house and hang Mandarin calligraphy scrolls instead.

Mr. Gao is a retired general, and befitting their social status, the Gaos arrive bringing expensive gifts for the bride and US$30,000 to hold an extravagant wedding for their son. Because his father has just recovered from a stroke, Wai-Tung dares not tell his parents the truth. As a part of the lie, Wai-Tung introduces Simon, who remains in the house during the visit, as his landlord.

The day after his parents arrive, Wai-Tung announces that he and Wei-Wei plan to be married by a Justice of the Peace. His mother is unable to conceal the heartbreak she experiences at the courthouse wedding and lack of ceremony. When General Gao’s former batman, who now owns a restaurant and reception hall, chides Wai-Tung for his thoughtlessness and offers to throw a magnificent wedding banquet, Wai-Tung is moved to make up for the "disgraceful" wedding by accepting the offer. After the lavish banquet, a huge party of relatives and friends barges into the bridal suite for an after party and demand that the newlyweds get in bed naked before they will leave. This leads to Wei-Wei's pregnancy. Simon is extremely upset when he finds out, provoking an argument between the three of them; his relationship with Wai-Tung begins to deteriorate. Wei-Wei considers having an abortion.

Mr. Gao suffers another stroke, and in a moment of anguish at the hospital, Wai-Tung admits the truth to his mother. She is shocked and insists that he not tell his father. However, the perceptive Mr. Gao has understood more than he is letting on. He tells Simon that he knows about their relationship and considers Simon his son as well, appreciating the considerable sacrifices Simon made to be together with Wai-Tung. Mr. Gao gives Simon a hongbao, a symbolic admission of their relationship, but has Simon promise not to let on to the others that he knows the truth; without the sham marriage, he would never have a grandchild. While en route to an appointment for an abortion, Wei-Wei decides to keep the baby and asks Simon to stay together with Wai-Tung and be the baby's father too.

At the airport awaiting the Gaos' flight home, they look at the wedding album photos that reflect the relationships that have developed among them all. Mr. Gao warmly shakes Simon’s hand and Mrs. Gao bids Wei-Wei a fond farewell before the Gaos walk off to board their plane.

== Cast ==
- Winston Chao as Gao Wai-Tung (simplified Chinese: 高伟同; traditional Chinese: 高偉同; pinyin: Gāo Wěitóng; Wade–Giles: Kao^{1} Wei^{3}-t'ung^{2})
- May Chin as Gu Wei-Wei (顧葳葳; 顾葳葳; Gù Wēiwēi; Ku^{4} Wei^{1}-wei^{1})
- Mitchell Lichtenstein as Simon (賽門; 賽门; Sàimén; Sai^{4}-men^{2})
- Gua Ah-leh as Mrs. Gao (高母; Gāo mǔ; Kao^{1} mu^{3}), Wai-Tung's mother
- Lung Sihung as Mr. Gao (高父; Gāo fù; Kao^{1} fu^{4}), Wai-Tung's father
- Vanessa Yang as Mao Mei (毛妹; Máo mèi; Mao^{2} mei^{4})
- Dion Birney as Andrew
- Neal Huff as Steve
- Jeanne Kuo Chang as Wai-Tung's secretary
- Hsu Yung-Teh as Bob Law
- Eddie Johns as Haskell
- Michael Gaston as Justice of the Peace
- Mason Lee as a baby
- Ang Lee as a wedding guest

== Analysis ==
Elisabetta Marino, author of "When East Meets West: A Sweet and Sour Encounter in Ang Lee's The Wedding Banquet", wrote that the film suggests that there can be a reconciliation between Eastern and Western cultures, unlike in Amy Tan's novels where the cultural differences are portrayed as irreconcilable. About 60% of the film's dialogue is in Mandarin Chinese. Marino wrote that "after striving to read the subtitles for the first ten or fifteen minutes, one finds oneself so completely absorbed in the flow of the story, in the tones of the several voices, in the gestures and the facial expressions of the actors, that one simply forgets to read and reaches an understanding beyond languages, beyond words, following a plot and, most of all, a set of characters who do not conform to the stereotypical portrayals an American audience would expect." Marino argued that "Lee's creative process and his final choice of two languages, Mandarin Chinese and English, for the movie are in themselves symptomatic of his wish to reach a peaceful coexistence between apparently irreconcilable cultures, without conferring the leading role on either of them."

== Production ==
=== Development and writing ===
Neil Peng approached director Ang Lee with the idea behind The Wedding Banquet in 1986 by revealing to Lee that one of their mutual friends had moved to the United States and was in a same-sex relationship without the knowledge of the man's parents. Lee and Peng began writing the screenplay two years later and were soon joined by James Schamus. In the published screenplay version of the film, Schamus wrote that the film was "first drafted in Chinese, then translated into English, re-written in English, translated back into Chinese, and eventually subtitled in Chinese and English and a dozen other languages." The script won a Taiwan state film competition in 1990.

=== Casting ===
The Wedding Banquet was the debut film of Winston Chao, whom Ang Lee met on an airline where he was working as a flight attendant. Chao, who had no formal acting training, was reticent to take the part, until Lee agreed to coach him with an acting instructor of his choosing. Chao spent three-to-four hours each day before and during filming in in-depth rehearsals.

=== Filming ===
Filming took place entirely on-location in New York City. To keep the budget low, the production used free or public locations, including JFK International Airport, the Mayor's Office of Film, Theatre & Broadcasting, Socrates Sculpture Park in Queens, NewYork-Presbyterian Lower Manhattan Hospital, and cast and crew members' homes. The titular banquet scene was shot in the ballroom of a Sheraton Hotel near LaGuardia Airport.

== Release ==
The Wedding Banquet was first screened publicly at the Berlin International Film Festival. It opened in Los Angeles and New York on August 4, 1993.

In Taipei, the film was the highest grossing Chinese-language film of the year on its release in 1993, earning NT$ 47.78 million. The Wedding Banquet was one of the few Taiwanese films released in Hong Kong in 1993 and the only to gross a larger amount at the box office, earning HK$15.47 million. The worldwide gross of The Wedding Banquet was $23.6 million. The New York Times reported a budget of $750,000. Considering the $1 million budget reported by Variety, the film was also the most financially profitable movie of 1993, when considered in terms of ratios of return, while overall top grosser Jurassic Park only earned a ratio of 13.8 ($914 million earnings on a $60 million budget).

== Reception ==
The Wedding Banquet received positive reviews; on the review aggregator Rotten Tomatoes, the film holds a 94% approval rating based on 95 reviews, with an average rating of 7.7/10. The website's critical consensus reads, "Ang Lee's funny and ultimately poignant comedy of manners, The Wedding Banquet reveals the filmmaker's skill across genres." Alan Jones of the Radio Times said, "Sharply observed and never once striking a false note, this sweet-and-sour rib-tickler is a real treat." Roger Ebert wrote, "What makes the film work is the underlying validity of the story, the way the filmmakers don't simply go for melodrama and laughs, but pay these characters their due. At the end of the film, I was a little surprised how much I cared for them."

Derek Elley said in 1994 that Ang Lee's critical and box office success with The Wedding Banquest made him the first director since the emergence of Taiwan New Cinema in over ten years ago to "straddle the wall between commercial and critical acclaim."

=== Accolades ===
| Institution | Year | Category | Nominee | Outcome |
|---|---|---|---|---|
| Academy Awards | 1993 | Best Foreign-Language Film | | Nominated |
| Berlin International Film Festival | 1993 | Golden Bear | Ang Lee | Won (tied with Xie Fei for Woman Sesame Oil Maker) |
| Deauville American Film Festival | 1993 | Coup de Coeur LTC | Ang Lee | Won |
| Deauville American Film Festival | 1993 | Critics Award | Ang Lee | Won (tied with Bryan Singer for Public Access) |
| GLAAD Media Awards | 1994 | Outstanding Film – Limited Release | | Won |
| Golden Globe Awards | 1994 | Best Foreign-Language Film | | Nominated |
| Golden Horse Awards | 1993 | Best Narrative Feature | Ang Lee, Ted Hope, James Schamus | Won |
| Golden Horse Awards | 1993 | Best Director | Ang Lee | Won |
| Golden Horse Awards | 1993 | Best Original Screenplay | Ang Lee, Neil Peng, James Schamus | Won |
| Golden Horse Awards | 1993 | Best Supporting Actor | Lung Sihung | Won |
| Golden Horse Awards | 1993 | Best Supporting Actress | Gua Ah-leh | Won |
| Golden Horse Awards | 1993 | Best Film Editing | Tim Squyres | Nominated |
| Independent Spirit Awards | 1994 | Best Film | Ang Lee, Ted Hope, James Schamus | Nominated |
| Independent Spirit Awards | 1994 | Best Director | Ang Lee | Nominated |
| Independent Spirit Awards | 1994 | Best Screenplay | Ang Lee, Neil Peng, James Schamus | Nominated |
| Independent Spirit Awards | 1994 | Best Male Lead | Mitchell Lichtenstein | Nominated |
| Independent Spirit Awards | 1994 | Best Female Lead | May Chin | Nominated |
| Independent Spirit Awards | 1994 | Best Supporting Female | Gua Ah-leh | Nominated |
| New York International Independent Film Festival | 1999 | Director's Choice Award | Ang Lee | Won |
| Seattle International Film Festival | 1993 | Best Film | | Won |
| Seattle International Film Festival | 1993 | Best Director | Ang Lee | Won |
| Turkish Film Critics Association | 1995 | Best Foreign Film | | 19th place |

== Remake ==
A remake from director Andrew Ahn starring Lily Gladstone, Kelly Marie Tran, Han Gi-chan, and Bowen Yang in the key roles, with supporting parts from Joan Chen and Youn Yuh-jung, premiered at the 2025 Sundance Film Festival, and was released on April 18, 2025. Principal photography took place in Vancouver, British Columbia from May 27, 2024 to June 28, 2024.

== Stage adaptations ==
In December 1993, a novelization of the film, titled Wedding Banquet (ウェディングバンケット, Wedingu Banketto) and published in Japan, was written by Yūji Konno (今野 雄二, Konno Yūji). (ISBN 4-8387-0508-5)

In 2003, the Village Theatre presented a musical staging of the story. It was directed by John Tillinger, choreographed by Sergio Trujillo, with music by Woody Pak and book and lyrics by Brian Yorkey. Yorkey, Village's associate artistic director, said this of the production, "The film succeeds because of Ang Lee's delicate poetry, and there is no way we can replicate that or translate that into a musical. So we took the story a step further. Whereas the film ends very ambiguously, our musical goes on past where the film ends". The show starred Welly Yang as Wai Tung.

== See also ==
- Mixed-orientation marriage
- Lavender marriage
- List of submissions to the 66th Academy Awards for Best Foreign Language Film
- List of Taiwanese submissions for the Academy Award for Best Foreign Language Film
