= Bedding ceremony =

Wedding ritual

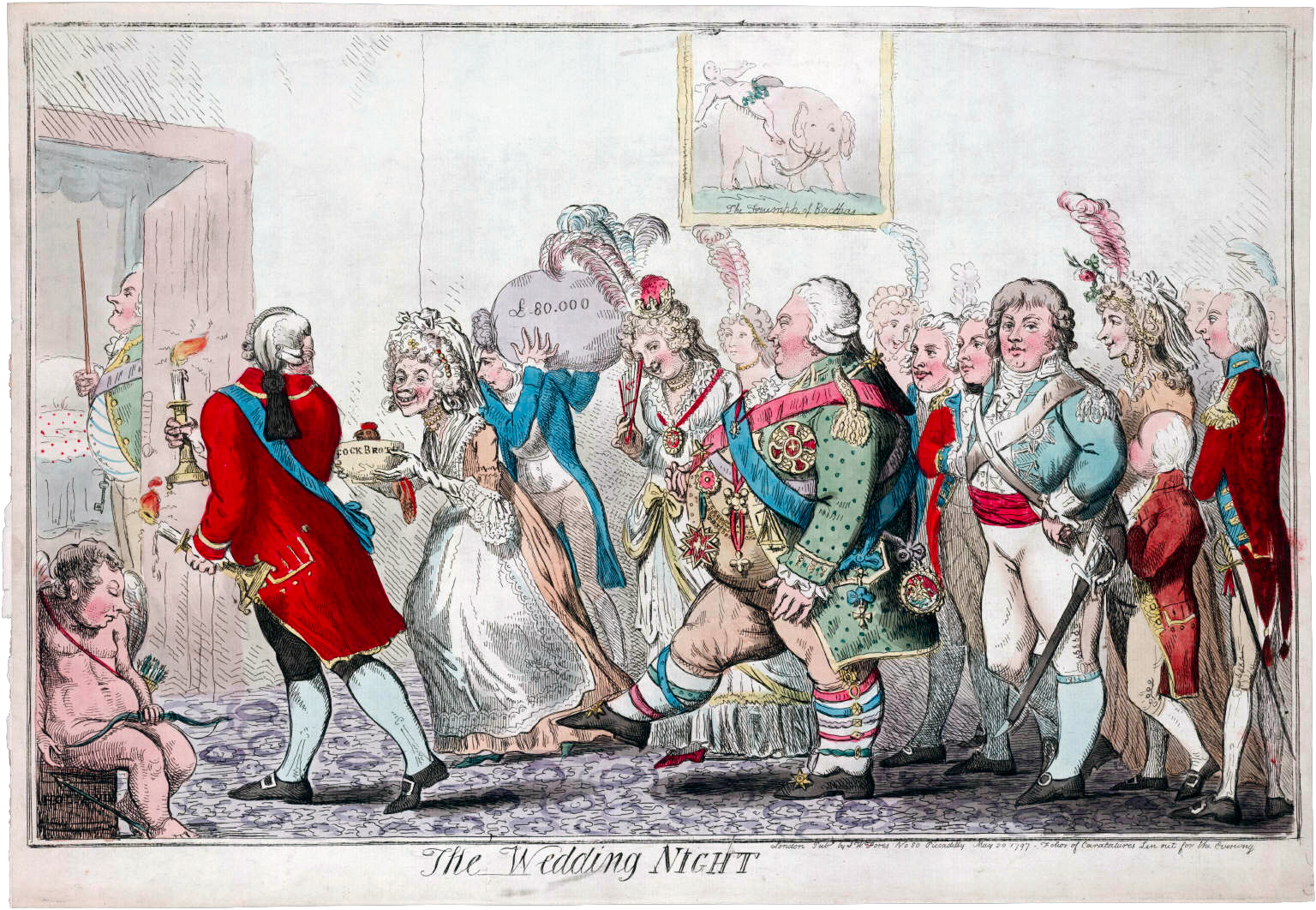
A satirical cartoon by Isaac Cruikshank of Princess Charlotte and Prince Frederick being led to bed by a party including her parents, King George III and Queen Charlotte

The bedding ceremony refers to the wedding custom of putting the newlywed couple together in the marital bed in front of numerous witnesses, usually family, friends, and neighbors, thereby completing the marriage.

The purpose of the ritual was to establish the consummation of the marriage, either by actually witnessing the couple's first sexual intercourse, or far more often symbolically, by leaving before consummation. It symbolized the community's involvement in the marriage. The legally binding nature of the ceremony varied greatly from place to place and through time.

== Traditions ==
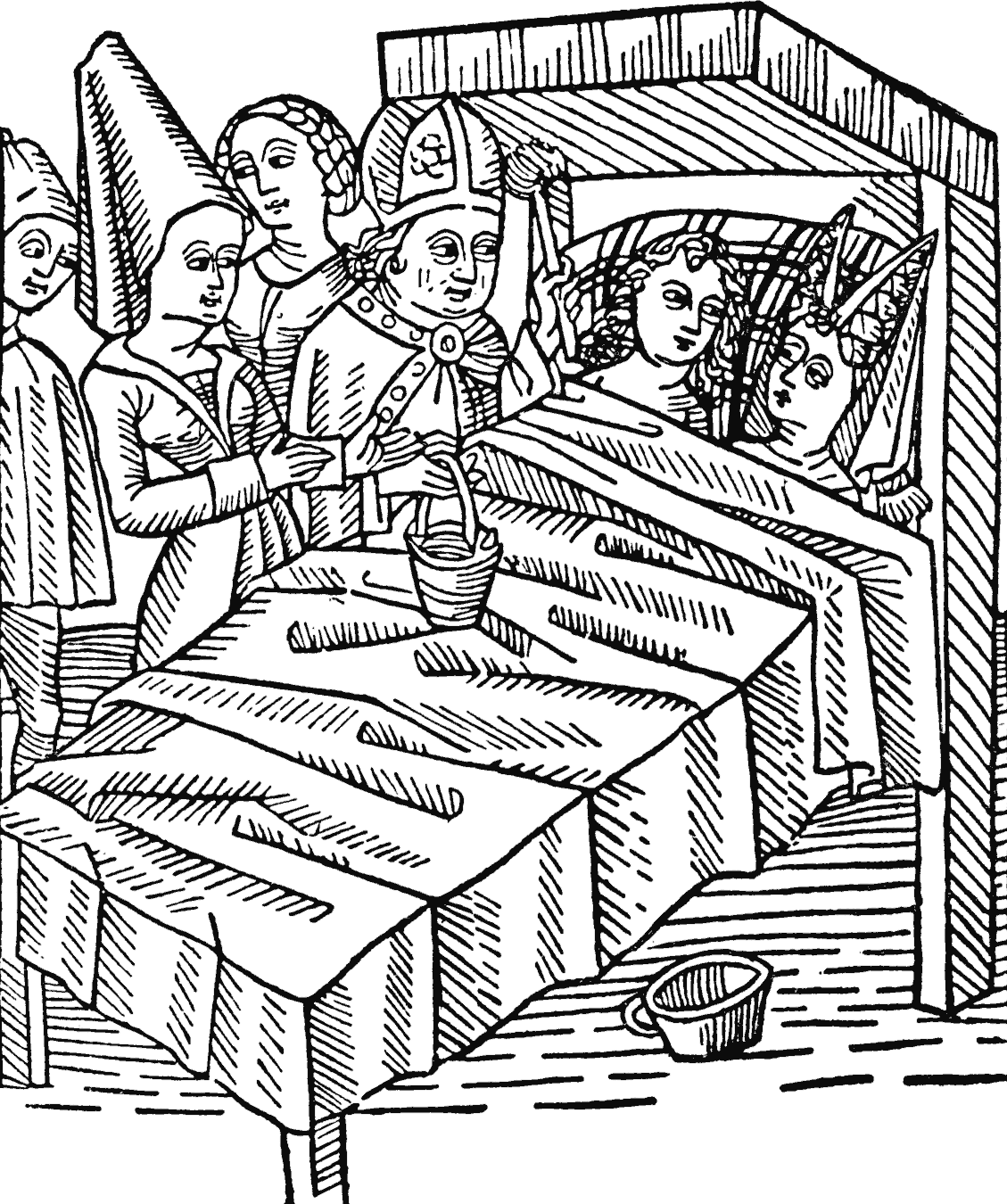
Reymont and Melusina blessed by the bishop in their bed on their wedlock, 15th-century woodcut

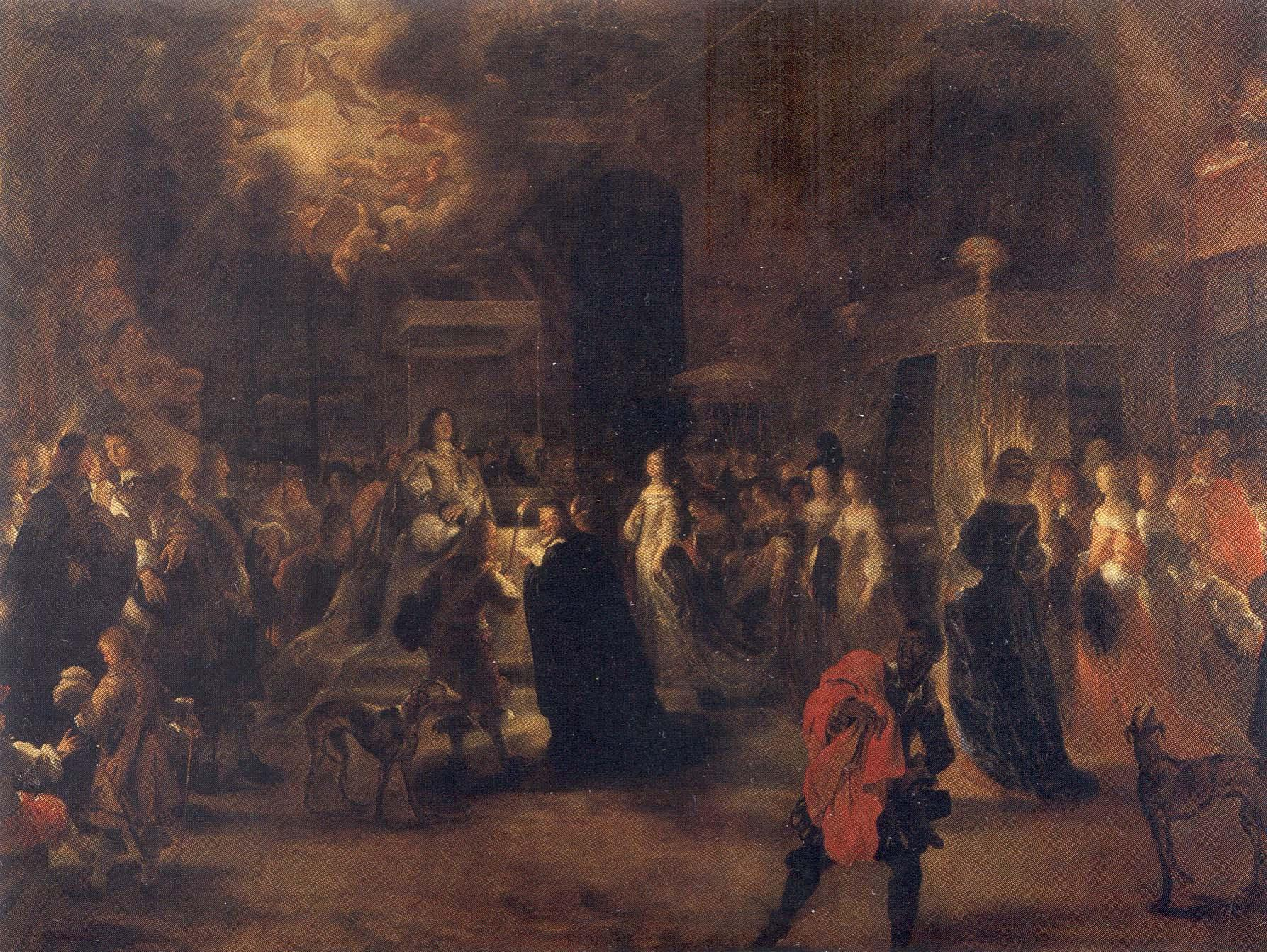
After the wedding in 1654 between Charles X Gustav of Sweden and Hedvig Eleonora of Holstein-Gottorp.

Bedding rituals have been practised in various European cultures, the ceremony differing from place to place. The people putting the newlyweds in bed have usually included their family, friends and wider community. The ritual is often associated with music, bawdy songs and jokes. It symbolised the community's involvement in the marriage and especially in the couple's sexual intimacy, but also their marital fidelity. The consummation itself, i.e. the couple's first sexual intercourse, was not witnessed in most of Western Europe.

In England, the ceremony usually began with a priest blessing the bed, after which the newlyweds prepared themselves for bed and drank sweet and spicy wine. The groomsmen and the bridesmaids then sat on the sides of the bed and threw the couple's stockings at them; a hit was believed to indicate that the thrower would soon marry. Finally the curtains were drawn around the bed and the couple was left alone. Some newlyweds refused to take part in the bedding ceremony. King Charles I of England (r. 1625–1649) notably barred the door of his bedroom; however, despite his rejection, the custom remained prevalent for another century among all social classes, including the royal family. (Note: The bedding ritual was fully observed at the wedding of King Charles II's niece and nephew, Mary and William, with the King himself drawing the curtains.)

In the 16th century, in what is now Germany, the bedding ceremony was performed to the sound of pipes, drums and "obscene noises", after which the couple was left alone and the guests continued celebrating loudly enough for the newlyweds not to be heard. In many places, the newlyweds were dressed for bed separately by their family or community and then led to the bedroom. In others, the couple was expected to rejoin the party afterwards. During the Reformation era, the bedding ceremony was associated with rituals that assigned socioeconomic rights and duties to the bride as housewife.

In Scandinavia, it was the most distinguished wedding guest who led the bride to bed in a festive procession. (Note: The Mayor of Stockholm led the bride c. 1416. In 1528, the Swedish king Gustav Vasa performed the role at the wedding of his trusted servant.) After putting them in bed, the guests offered dishes to the newlyweds and quickly ate with them before leaving them alone. Due to the ritual's importance, specially decorated wedding beds were sometimes borrowed from friends, family or neighbours. The bedding eventually became merely symbolic, with the bride's parents covering the newlyweds with a blanket and then uncovering them.

== Legal consequences ==
The original purpose of the bedding ceremony was to establish the consummation of the marriage, without which the union could be annulled. The legally binding nature of the ritual was unclear to many, particularly to lower classes. One marriage in Britain was annulled on the pretext that the bride had run away within 15 minutes of the ritual, and in another case, a clandestine marriage was made public when the pregnant wife shared her husband's deathbed. Public bedding in 18th-century Britain was widely believed to give additional legitimacy to the marriage. In Scotland, although marriage was formed by simple consent and required no formalities or consummation, the bedding rituals were widespread but unstructured; a couple simply wanted someone to see them in bed together. A couple could also be pressured into marriage in this way: a person stumbling upon an unmarried couple in bed could pronounce them man and wife on the spot.

In medieval Scandinavia, the bedding ceremony was of great legal importance. Laws in many Swedish provinces regarded public bedding as essential to the completion of a marriage, but the legal importance later diminished due to new royal laws. In Iceland, a marriage was only valid if it included the bedding ritual witnessed by at least six men.

In the case of royal marriages, the ceremony took on added significance.

== In popular culture ==
The bedding ritual has featured in popular culture for centuries. It has been hinted at in The Penny Wedding, an 1818 painting by David Wilkie, and possibly also in the homonymous 1819 painting by Alexander Carse.

A bedding ceremony takes place in the film The Wedding Banquet.

Numerous songs also make references to the ceremony.

The Bride lap in to the Bed,
Ann the Bridgroom ged till her
The Fidler crap [crept] in to the mids[t]
Ann they H—dled altogether.

— The broadside ballad narrator on the marriage ceremony, in "A Dialogue between ald John M'Clatchy and Young Willie Ha"

In the television series Game of Thrones, a bedding ceremony features in several episodes. It is conceived as a "Westerosi tradition following the wedding feast", wherein the attendees forcibly undress and carry the newlyweds to their bed. The intention is to "celebrate a marriage's consummation".

== See also ==
- Beilager
- Consummation
- Yichud

== Bibliography ==
- Bailey, Merridee; Barclay, Katie (2017). Emotion, Ritual and Power in Europe, 1200–1920: Family, State and Church. Springer. ISBN 978-3319441856.
- Lucas, Katie M. (1 April 2015). "Day 11: What Is the Bedding Ceremony?". Archived from the original on 11 July 2021.
- Korpiola, Mia (2009). Between Betrothal and Bedding: Marriage Formation in Sweden 1200–1600. BRILL. ISBN 978-9004173293.
- Monger, George (2004). Marriage Customs of the World: From Henna to Honeymoons. ABC-CLIO. ISBN 1576079872.
- Stone, Lawrence (1992). Uncertain Unions: Marriage in England, 1660–1753. Oxford University Press. ISBN 0198202539.
