= Gua Ah-leh =

Taiwanese actress and singer

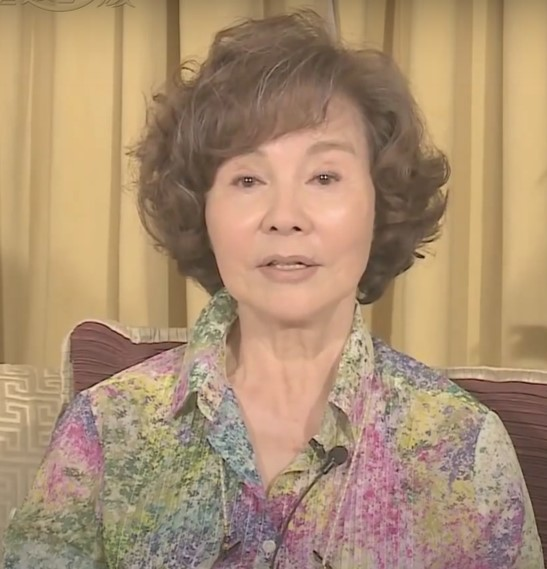
- Gua in 2015
- Born: 2 June 1944 (age 82); Changsha, Hunan, China
- Education: National Taiwan University of Arts
- Occupations: Actress; singer
- Years active: 1965–present
- Spouse: Chang Meng-kui (m. 1965)
- Children: 2
- Awards: Asia Pacific Film Festival; Best Actress; 1970 Home in Taipei; Karlovy Vary International Film Festival; Best Actress; 1995 Maiden Rose; Golden Horse Awards – Best Actress; 1966 The Rain of Sorrow; 1970 Home in Taipei; Best Supporting Actress; 1978 Brother's Diary; 1993 The Wedding Banquet Hundred Flowers Awards – Best Supporting Actress; 2008 The Knot Golden Bell Awards – Best Actress; 1991 Her Growth; 1997 Blessed Virgin Mary

Chinese name
- Traditional Chinese: 歸亞蕾
- Simplified Chinese: 归亚蕾
Transcriptions
Standard Mandarin
- Hanyu Pinyin: Guī Yǎléi
- Wade–Giles: Kuei1 Ya3-lei2
- Musical career
- Also known as: Grace Gua; Grace Guei; Gua Ah-lei; Kuei Ya-lei; Kwei Ya-lay
- Genres: Mandopop

Grace Gua Ah-leh (born 2 June 1944) is a Taiwanese actress and singer. Gua has portrayed over 200 roles in film and television since 1965. She has won the Golden Horse Awards four times and the Golden Bell Awards twice.

== Life and career ==
Also known as Kuei Ya-lei and Grace Gua, Gua Ah Leh was born in China in 1944. She studied acting at the National Taiwan University of Arts. In 1965, she made her professional movie debut in The Rain of Sorrow, and received a Golden Horse Award for Best Leading Actress. That award made her the youngest Leading Actress winner in the Golden Horse history. Next year, she was in the movie Home, Sweet Home. Her performance in that movie won the Best Leading Actress in the Asia Pacific Film Festival (Indonesia), and another Best Leading Actress Golden Horse award. In 1978, she won the Best Supporting Actress Golden Horse award for her role in The Diary of Di-Di.

In 1986, Gua Ah-leh was the producer for Fortune, Prosperity, Longevity, and Happiness (福祿壽喜) a TV show that focused attention on senior care. In 1991, she won a Golden Bell Award leading actress for her role in the TV show Her Growth (她的成長). In 1997, she won a second Golden Bell Award leading actress for her role in the TV show Marian. In 1993, she worked with director Ang Lee in the movie The Wedding Banquet and went on to receive the Best Supporting Actress Golden Horse award. She was also nominated in the Independent Spirit Awards for Best Supporting Female in US. In 1994, she worked with Ang Lee again and was nominated as the Best Supporting Actress in the Golden Horse Awards for the movie Eat, Drink, Man, Woman. In 1995, she won the Best Leading Actress award in Eastern Europe in the Karlovy Vary International Film Festival for Maiden Rose. In 1997, she won the Golden Bell Best Leading Actress award for the TV show Virgin Mary. In 2008, she won the Best Supporting Actress in the Hundred Years Flower Award for the movie The Knot in China.

For the last five years, she has been working on films in Hong Kong, China and Taiwan that support equal rights and same sex marriage. In 2015, she was the leading actress in the film Baby Steps, which was one of the most popular gay movies in Taiwan. Her performance was nominated for Best Actress at Los Angeles Outfest 2015, and won the Best Actress award at the 2015 Winston-Salem Out at the Movies Festival.

== Selected filmography ==
Film

- The Rain of Sorrow (1965)
- The Winter (1969)
- You Can't Tell Him (1971)
- The Coldest Winter in Peking (1981)
- The Anger (1982)
- Lai Shi, China's Last Eunuch (1988)
- Miracles (1989)
- The Wedding Banquet (1993)
- Eat Drink Man Woman (1994)
- Tonight Nobody Goes Home (1996)
- The Knot (2006)
- 20 Once Again (2015)
- Baby Steps (2015)
- Summer's Desire (2016)

Television series

- Palace of Desire (2000)
- Ju Zi Hong Le (橘子紅了) (2001)
- The Prince of Qin, Li Shimin (2005)
- The Emperor in Han Dynasty (2005)
- The Dream of Red Mansions (2010)
- The Legend of Incorruptible Stone (2011)
- Poetry of the Song Dynasty (2019)

== Awards and nominations ==
- Golden Horse Film Festival (1965), Best Leading Actress for The Rain of Sorrow
- Golden Horse Film Festival (1966), Best Leading Actress for Home, Sweet Home
- Asia Pacific Film Festival (1966), Best Leading Actress for Home, Sweet Home
- Golden Horse Film Festival (1978), Best Supporting Actress for Didi's Diary
- Golden Bell Award (1991), Best Leading Actress for TV Her Growth (她的成長)
- Golden Horse Film Festival (1993), Best Supporting Actress for The Wedding Banquet
- Karlovy Vary International Film Festival (1995), Best Actress for Maiden Rose
- Hundred Flowers Awards (2008), Best Supporting Actress for "The knot"
- Chinese American Film Festival (2019), Golden Angel for Best Actress in a Leading Role for Number One
