= Sihung Lung =

Taiwanese actor

- 郞雄
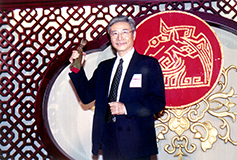
- Lung in 1991
- Born: 郎益三; 1 January 1930; Suqian, Jiangsu, Republic of China
- Died: 2 May 2002 (aged 72); Taipei, Taiwan
- Occupation: Actor
- Years active: 1970–2002
- Awards: Order of St. Sylvester, 1993 ; Golden Horse Awards – Best Actor; Golden Horse Awards – Best Supporting Actor; Golden Bell Awards – Best Actor 1997; Golden Horse Awards – Lifetime Achievement Award; 1991 Pushing Hands; 1976 The Venturer; 1993 The Wedding Banquet; 2002 Lifetime Achievement

Sihung Lung (Chinese: 郞雄; pinyin: Láng Xióng; Wade–Giles: Lang Hsiung; c. 1930 – 2 May 2002) was a Taiwanese actor. He appeared in over 100 films and TV series throughout his career and was best known for playing paternal roles in Ang Lee's films Pushing Hands, The Wedding Banquet and Eat Drink Man Woman.

== Life and career ==
Lung enlisted in National Revolutionary Army as a teenager to fight the Chinese Communist Party. After the Communists seized control of mainland China, he escaped to Taiwan, where he was selected to join an army-sponsored acting troupe. Acting later became his career. His experience playing an array of roles for the army troupe later led his being cast in over 100 Chinese-language films and in Taiwanese soap operas, typically playing criminals or tough guys.

Lung had already retired from films when Ang Lee began casting for his first full-length film, 1992's Pushing Hands, and the director, who recalled watching Mr. Lung as a child, asked him to play a father in the film. Lung's sensitive portrayal of an elderly man faced with change turned him into an international star and he became famous for playing fathers struggling with modernity and adult children in the movies known to some fans as the "Father Knows Best" trilogy.

Lung was Roman Catholic.

== Death ==
By the time he appeared as "Sir Te", guardian of a mystical sword in Crouching Tiger, Hidden Dragon, Lung's health had deteriorated due to diabetes. He died of liver failure in 2002 at the age of 72.

== Filmography ==
| Year | Title | Role | Notes |
|---|---|---|---|
| 1974 | Chi qing yu nu | Japanese colonel | |
| 1974 | Da mo tian ling | | |
| 1975 | Meng hu | | |
| 1976 | Lang ya kou | | |
| 1976 | Eight Hundred Heroes | | |
| 1976 | Hei long hui | | |
| 1976 | Lao hu ya | | |
| 1978 | Di Di ri ji | Lin chou-kang | |
| 1978 | Wu qing huang di you qing tian | | |
| 1979 | Xiang ye qi tan | | |
| 1979 | Zao an tai bei | Tein-lin's Father | |
| 1979 | Wang yang zhong de yi tiao chuan | | |
| 1980 | Xiang ye ren | Commander Hsu | |
| 1980 | Tian liang hao ge qiu | | |
| 1981 | Huang tian hou tu | | |
| 1981 | Long de chuan ren | | |
| 1982 | Xue zhan da er dan | | |
| 1986 | Hao xiao zi | | |
| 1986 | Tangshan guo Taiwan | | |
| 1987 | Bao gao ban zhang | | |
| 1987 | Kua yue shi kong de xiao zi | | |
| 1987 | Chung Gwok jui hau yat goh tai gam | | |
| 1991 | Pushing Hands | Mr. Chu | |
| 1991 | Da tou bing shang zhan chang: Za pai jun | | |
| 1992 | Wu hu si hai | Uncle Tuan | |
| 1993 | The Wedding Banquet | Mr. Gao | |
| 1994 | Eat Drink Man Woman | Chu | |
| 1994 | Qing ren de qing ren | | |
| 1994 | Zu sun qing | | |
| 1995 | Formosa Sisters | Captain | |
| 1996 | Tonight Nobody Goes Home | Dr. Chen Pinyan | |
| 1997 | The Opium War | He Jingrong | |
| 1997 | Hei jin | | |
| 1998 | Fuyajo | Yang Weimin | |
| 2000 | Crouching Tiger, Hidden Dragon | Sir Te | |
| 2002 | Double Vision | Taoist Expert | |
| 2002 | The Touch | The Monk-Dun Huang | (final film role) |

== See also ==
- Manchu people in Taiwan
