= Transnational Chinese Cinemas =

Transnational Chinese Cinemas: Identity, Nationhood, Gender is a non-fiction collection of essays edited by Sheldon Hsiao-peng Lu, published in 1997 by University of Hawaiʻi Press.

It discusses film from multiple territories, including mainland China, Hong Kong, and Taiwan.

== Background ==
The editor gave a conference in 1994 titled "Rethinking Cross-Cultural Analysis and Chinese Cinema Studies," delivered at the University of Pittsburgh. The articles of the book were previously published elsewhere, with most of them originating from that conference. The articles were written by people specializing in different academic fields.

== Reception ==
Robert Ru-Shou Chen of National Taiwan College of Art wrote that the book is "a valuable book in updating our study of" the subject matter.

Stanley Rosen of the University of Southern California praised the book for minimizing issues he saw in academic essay compilations stemming from academic conferences.
