= Ang Lee =

Taiwanese filmmaker (born 1954)

- 李安
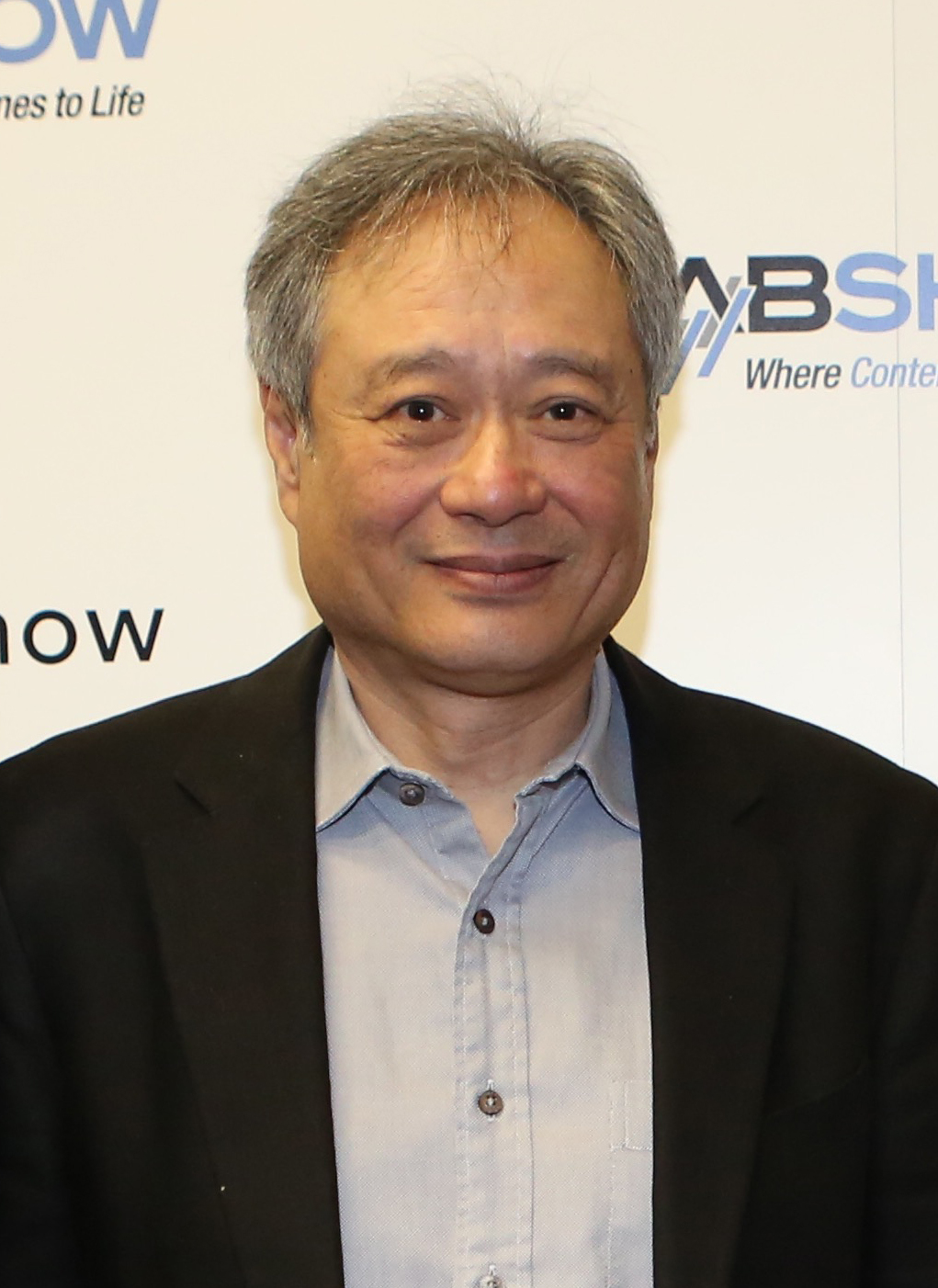
- Lee in 2016
- Born: October 23, 1954 (age 72); Chaozhou, Pingtung, Taiwan
- Education: National Taiwan University of Arts (AA); University of Illinois Urbana-Champaign (BFA); New York University (MFA)
- Occupations: Film director; producer; screenwriter
- Years active: 1991–present
- Spouse: Jane Lin
- Children: 2, including Mason
- Awards: Full list

Chinese name
- Chinese: 李安
Transcriptions
Standard Mandarin
- Hanyu Pinyin: Lǐ Ān
- Bopomofo: ㄌㄧˇ ㄢ
- Gwoyeu Romatzyh: Lii An
- Wade–Giles: Li^{3} An^{1}
- IPA: [lì án]
Yue: Cantonese
- Yale Romanization: Léih Ōn
- Jyutping: Lei^{5} On^{1}
- IPA: [lej˩˧ ɔn˥]
Southern Min
- Hokkien POJ: Lí An

Ang Lee (Note: Pronounced /æŋ liː/) OBS (Chinese: 李安; pinyin: Lǐ Ān; born October 23, 1954) is a Taiwanese filmmaker. His films are known for their emotional charge and exploration of repressed and hidden emotions. During his career, Lee has received international critical and popular acclaim and numerous accolades, including two Academy Awards, four BAFTA Awards, and three Golden Globe Awards. He is also the only filmmaker to win the Golden Bear twice and one of only four filmmakers to win the Golden Lion twice, and received the BAFTA Fellowship in 2020.

Born in Pingtung County and raised in Hualien City, Taiwan, Lee graduated from what is now the National Taiwan University of Arts in 1975. After moving to the United States in 1979, he attended the University of Illinois Urbana-Champaign and New York University. He gained fame in Taiwan for the Father Knows Best trilogy—Pushing Hands (1991), The Wedding Banquet (1993), and Eat Drink Man Woman (1994)—which explore the relationships and conflicts between tradition, modernity, Eastern and Western.

Lee's breakthrough in Hollywood came with Sense and Sensibility (1995), which was his first English-language film. He gained further acclaim for The Ice Storm (1997), Crouching Tiger, Hidden Dragon (2000), Lust, Caution (2007), Brokeback Mountain (2005), and Life of Pi (2012). Other notable films include Hulk (2003), Billy Lynn's Long Halftime Walk (2016), and Gemini Man (2019).

== Early life and education ==
Lee was born on October 23, 1954, to a waishengren family in a military dependents' village of the Republic of China Armed Forces, located in Chaochou, Pingtung, a southern agricultural county in Taiwan. Both of Lee's parents moved following the end of the Chinese Civil War in 1949 from De'an, Jiangxi, to Taiwan. He grew up in a household that put a heavy emphasis on education. In 1956, when Lee was 2 years old, his family moved to Hualien because his father took a position as the Principal of Taiwan Provincial Hualien Normal School (TPHNS). Lee attended two elementary schools in Hualien: Mingli Elementary School and Affiliated Primary School of Taiwan Provincial Hualien Normal School (now National Dong Hwa University Experimental Primary School). Lee has mentioned that the eight years he lived in Hualien were the happiest time of his life before he went north to study at National Arts School.

Lee studied in the Provincial Tainan First Senior High School (now National Tainan First Senior High School) where his father was the principal. He was expected to pass the annual Joint College/University Entrance Examination, the only route to a university education in Republic of China. But after failing the exam twice, to the disappointment of his father, he entered a three-year college, the National Arts School (now reorganized and expanded as National Taiwan University of Arts), and graduated in 1975. His father had wanted him to become a professor, but he had become interested in drama and the arts in college. This early frustration set his career on the path of performance art. Seeing Ingmar Bergman's film The Virgin Spring (1960) was a formative experience for him.

"The formation of an individual decides their world perception, especially the things that happen before one is 20, so since he did not go to the US until he was 23, "whatever I do, whatever I absorb outside [Taiwan], my nature remains very Taiwanese... The basic me was growing up here, mixed with a lot of other things. Taiwan is like this. Wherever I shoot my film, it is a Taiwanese film"

— Ang Lee, speaks of his attachment to Taiwan. Sabine Cheng & Lilian Wu, October 1, 2016

After finishing his mandatory military service in the Republic of China Navy (ROCN), Lee went to the US in 1979 to study at the University of Illinois at Urbana–Champaign, where he graduated with his Bachelor of Fine Arts in theater in 1980. Originally, Lee was interested in acting, but his challenges with speaking English made it difficult, and he quickly turned to directing. At UIUC, Lee met his future wife, Jane Lin (Chinese: 林惠嘉; pinyin: Lín Huìjiā), also a student from Taiwan, who was pursuing her PhD degree. Thereupon, he enrolled at the Tisch School of the Arts of New York University, where he received his M.F.A. in film production. He was a classmate of Spike Lee and worked on the crew of his thesis film, Joe's Bed-Stuy Barbershop: We Cut Heads.

During graduate school, Lee finished a 16mm short film, Shades of the Lake (1982), which won the Best Drama Award in Short Film in Taiwan. His own thesis work, a 43-minute drama, Fine Line (1984), won NYU's Wasserman Award for Outstanding Direction and was also chosen for broadcast by the Public Broadcasting Service.

Life after graduation

After graduating from NYU in 1985, Lee struggled to find work despite interest from the William Morris Agency, spending several years unemployed while continuing to write screenplays with his wife's support.

In 1990, Lee submitted two screenplays, Pushing Hands and The Wedding Banquet, to a competition sponsored by Government Information Office of R.O.C., and they came in first and second, respectively. The winning screenplays brought Lee to the attention of Hsu Li-kong (Chinese: 徐立功; pinyin: Xú Lìgōng), a recently promoted senior manager in a major studio who had a strong interest in Lee's unique style and freshness. Hsu, a first-time producer, invited Lee to direct Pushing Hands, a full-length feature that debuted in 1991.

== Career ==
=== 1991–1994: International films ===
The Father Knows Best trilogy

Pushing Hands (1991) was a success in Taiwan both among critics and at the box office. It received eight nominations in the Golden Horse Film Festival, Taiwan's premier film festival. Inspired by the success, Hsu Li-kong collaborated with Lee in their second film, The Wedding Banquet (1993), which won the Golden Bear at the 43rd Berlin International Film Festival and was nominated as the Best Foreign Language Film in both the Golden Globe and the Academy Awards. In all, this film collected eleven Taiwanese and international awards and made Lee a rising star. These first two movies were based on stories of Chinese Americans, and both were filmed in the US.

In 1994, Hsu invited Lee to return to Taiwan to make Eat Drink Man Woman, a film that depicts traditional values, modern relationships, and family conflicts in Taipei. The film was a box office hit and was critically acclaimed. For a second consecutive year, Lee's film received the Best Foreign Language Film nomination in both the Golden Globe and Academy Awards, as well as in the British Academy Awards (BAFTA)s. Eat Drink Man Woman won five awards in Taiwan and internationally, including the Best Director from Independent Spirit.

The three films show the Confucian family at risk and star the Taiwanese actor Sihung Lung to form what has been called Lee's Father Knows Best trilogy.

=== 1994–2012: Breakthrough and acclaim ===
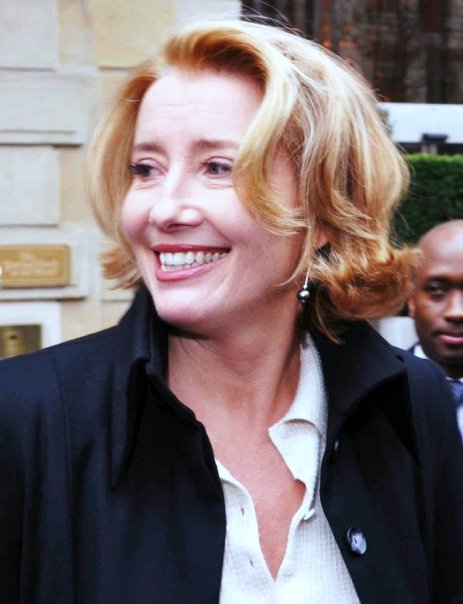
With the help of screenwriter and actress Emma Thompson (pictured in 2009), Lee adapted Sense and Sensibility (1995)

In 1995, Lee directed Columbia TriStar's British classic Sense and Sensibility based on the Jane Austen novel of the same name. This made Lee a second-time winner of the Golden Bear at the Berlin Film Festival. It was nominated for seven Academy Awards, and won Best Adapted Screenplay for screenwriter Emma Thompson, who also starred in the movie alongside Alan Rickman, Hugh Grant and Kate Winslet. Sense and Sensibility also won the Golden Globe Award for Best Motion Picture - Drama. Thompson has described the experience of working with Lee in his first English language film, noting how taken aback Lee was when the actors asked questions or provided suggestions, something Thompson notes as uncommon in Chinese culture. Once this disjuncture was bridged, Thompson remembered having "the most wonderful time because his notes were so brutal and funny." Janet Maslin of The New York Times praised Lee's adaptation writing, "Mr. Lee is after something more broadly accessible, a sparkling, colorful and utterly contemporary comedy of manners. He achieves this so pleasantly that Sense and Sensibility matches the Austen-based Clueless for sheer fun".

After this, Lee continued directing in Hollywood. He made The Ice Storm (1997), a drama set in 1970s suburban America, starring Kevin Kline, Sigourney Weaver, Joan Allen, and Tobey Maguire. The film competed at the 1997 Cannes Film Festival for the Palme d'Or. It received the Cannes Film Festival Award for Best Screenplay. Angie Errigo of Empire praised the film writing, "Lee seems incapable of making a less than outstanding movie" adding, "The real beauty of this film is the way in which Lee shifts his story from sex farce to youth drama to tragic despair with the help of a perfect ensemble cast".

Lee made another film, the revisionist Western drama Ride with the Devil (1999), set during the American Civil War. The film which starred Tobey Maguire, Skeet Ulrich, and Jeffrey Wright received mixed reviews and was a box office bomb. Entertainment Weekly described it as "oddly unengaging" and the "waxy yellow buildup of earnest tastefulness seals off every character from our access. These Americans aren't action figures; they're collectible figurines." For a time this interrupted Lee's unbroken popularity – from both general audiences and arthouse aficionados – since his first full-length movie. However, in the late 1990s and 2000s, The Ice Storm had high VHS and DVD sales and rentals and repeated screenings on cable television, which has increased the film's popularity among audiences.

In 1999, Hsu Li-kong, Lee's old partner and supporter, invited him to make a movie based on the traditional "wuxia" genre concerning the adventures of martial artists in ancient China. Excited about the opportunity to fulfill his childhood dream, Lee assembled a team from the United States, Taiwan, Hong Kong, Malaysia and mainland China for Crouching Tiger, Hidden Dragon (2000). The film starred Chow Yun-fat, Michelle Yeoh, and Zhang Ziyi and had surprising success worldwide. With Chinese dialogue and English subtitles, the film became the highest grossing foreign film in many countries, including the United States and the United Kingdom. Critics praised the film. Michael Rechtshaffen of The Hollywood Reporter praised Lee writing, "for his first Chinese-language assignment since 1994's Eat Drink Man Woman, Lee tries a little martial arts on for size – with jaw-droppingly exhilarating results". He added "A sweeping romantic epic with a strong feminist backbone, the thoroughly entertaining [film] also happens to boast a generous offering of seriously kick-ass action sequences that make The Matrix seem downright quaint by comparison." The film was nominated in 10 Academy Awards including Best Picture, Best Foreign Language Film, and Best Director. It ended up winning Best Foreign Language Film and three technical awards.

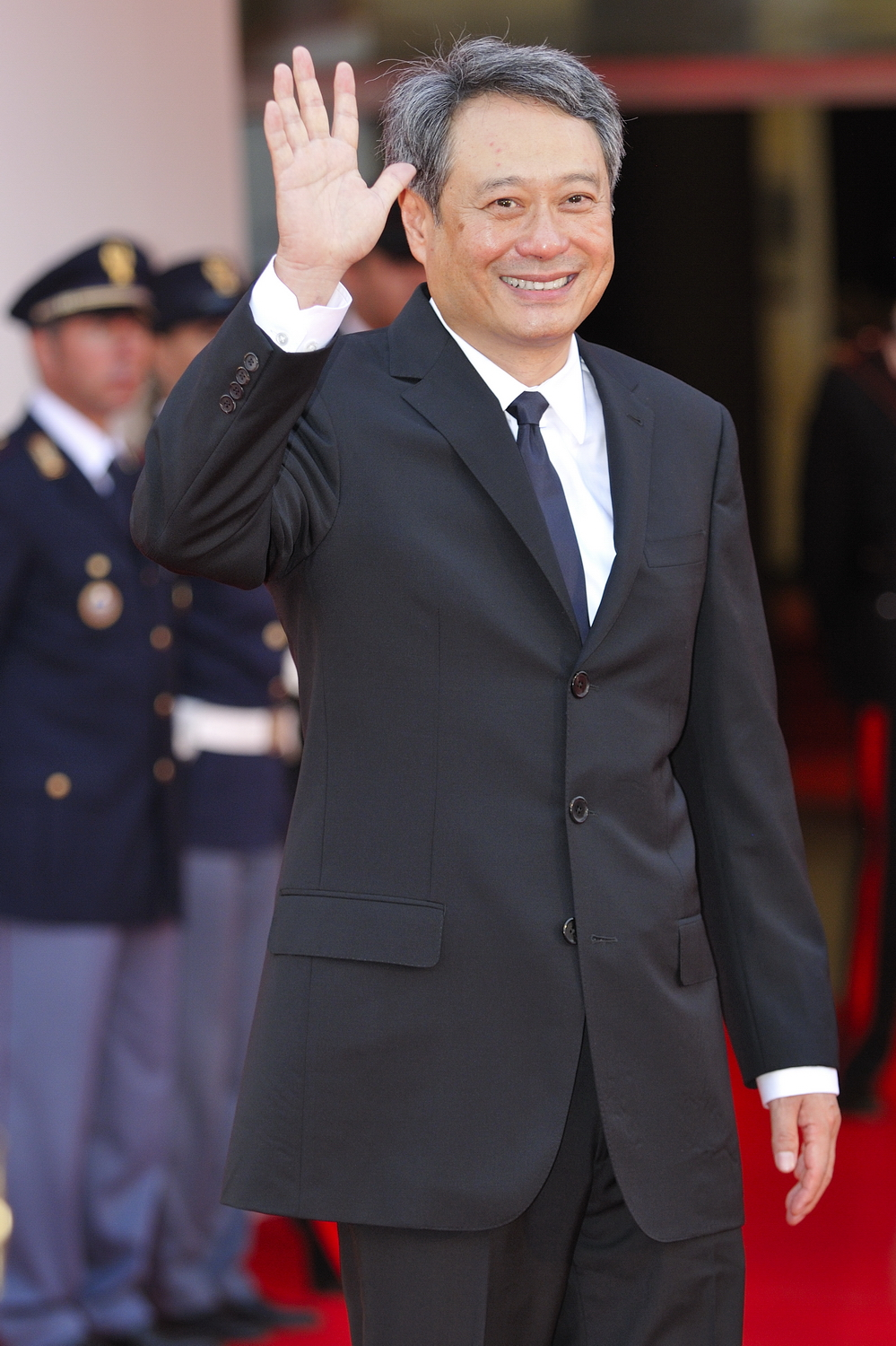
Lee at the Venice International Film Festival in 2009

In 2003, Lee returned to Hollywood to direct the superhero blockbuster Hulk, his second big-budget movie after the disappointment of Ride with the Devil's restricted release. The film was produced by Universal Pictures in collaboration with Marvel Entertainment. It starred Eric Bana as Bruce Banner / The Hulk with supporting performances from Jennifer Connelly, Sam Elliot and Nick Nolte. The film received mixed reviews while being a financial success, grossing over $245 million at the box office. After the setback, Lee considered retiring early, but his father encouraged him to continue making films. Roger Ebert gave the film a positive review, writing, "Lee is trying to actually deal with the issues in the story of the Hulk, instead of simply cutting to brainless visual effects."

Lee took on a small-budget, low-profile independent film based on Annie Proulx's Pulitzer Prize-finalist short story, Brokeback Mountain. In a 2005 article by Robert K. Elder, Lee was quoted as saying, "What do I know about gay ranch hands in Wyoming?" In spite of the director's distance from the subject at hand, Brokeback Mountain showcased Lee's skills in probing the depths of the human heart. The 2005 movie about the forbidden love between two Wyoming sheepherders immediately caught public attention and became a cultural phenomenon, initiating intense debates and becoming a box office hit.

The film was critically acclaimed at major international film festivals and won Lee numerous Best Director and Best Picture awards worldwide. Brokeback Mountain was the most acclaimed film of 2005, winning 71 awards and an additional 52 nominations. It won the Golden Lion (best film) award at the Venice International Film Festival and was named 2005's best film by the Los Angeles, New York, Boston, and London film critics. It also won best picture at the 2005 Broadcast Film Critics Association, Directors Guild of America, Writers Guild of America (Adapted Screenplay), Producers Guild of America and the Independent Spirit Awards as well as the Golden Globe Award for Best Motion Picture – Drama, with Lee winning the Golden Globe Award for Best Director. Brokeback Mountain also won Best Film and Best Director at the 2006 BAFTAs. It was nominated for a leading eight Oscars and was the front runner for Best Picture heading into March 5 ceremony, but lost out to Crash, a story about race relations in Los Angeles, in a controversial upset. He became the first non-white person to win the Best Director at the Academy Awards (which he won again for Life of Pi). In 2006, following his Best Director Oscar, Lee was bestowed the Order of Brilliant Star with Grand Cordon, the second highest civilian award, by the R.O.C. government.

His next film was Lust, Caution, which was adapted from the novella by Eileen Chang. The story was written in 1950, and was loosely based on an actual event that took place in 1939–1940 in Japanese-occupied Shanghai, China, during World War II. Lust, Caution was distributed by Focus Features and premiered at international film festivals in the summer and early fall of 2007. In the U.S., the movie received a NC-17 rating (no children 17 and under admitted) from the MPAA mainly due to several strongly explicit sex scenes. This was a challenge to the film's distribution because many theater chains in the United States refuse to show NC-17 films. The director and film studio decided not to appeal the decision. In order to show Lust, Caution in mainland China, Lee removed 9 minutes from the film.

Lust, Caution captured the Golden Lion from the 2007 Biennale Venice Film Festival, making Lee the winner of the highest prize for the second time in three years (Lee is one of only four filmmakers to have won the Golden Lion twice). When Lust, Caution was played in Lee's native Taiwan in its original full-length edition, it was very well received. Staying in Taiwan to promote the film and to participate in a traditional holiday, Lee got emotional when he found that his work was widely applauded by fellow Taiwanese. Lee admitted that he had low expectations for this film from the U.S. audience since "its pace, its film language;– it's all very Chinese." The film was submitted by Taiwan for consideration in the Best Foreign Language Film category at the Academy Awards, but the Academy ruled that an insufficient number of Taiwanese nationals had participated in the production, thus disqualifying it from further consideration; it was not nominated for any other category.

Lee was chosen to be president of the jury for the 2009 Venice Film Festival. Lee's next film after 2009's Taking Woodstock was Life of Pi, which was adapted from the novel of the same name written by Yann Martel. The novel was once considered impossible to make into a movie, but Lee persuaded 20th Century Fox to invest $120 million and relied heavily on 3D special effects in post-production. Unlike most other sci-fi precedents, the movie made its commercial premiere during Thanksgiving weekend of 2012 in the US and worldwide, and became a critical and box office success. In January 2013, Life of Pi earned 11 Academy Award nominations, including Best Picture, Best Director, Best Adapted Screenplay and Best Visual Effects. He went on to win the Academy Award for Best Director.

=== 2013–present ===
In 2013, he was selected as a member of the main competition jury at the 2013 Cannes Film Festival. In March 2013, it was announced that Lee would direct a television pilot for the drama series Tyrant, created by Gideon Raff and developed by Howard Gordon and Craig Wright. Production of the FX series was planned for summer 2013, but Lee later left the project to take a break.

Lee next directed the war drama Billy Lynn's Long Halftime Walk based on the novel of the same name. It was his first film since winning the Oscar for Best Director for Life of Pi. The film starred Joe Alwyn, Kristen Stewart, Vin Diesel, Steve Martin, and Chris Tucker. It premiered at the New York Film Festival and received a mixed response from audiences and critics alike and was a box office failure. Many critics criticized its high frame rate. Peter Bradshaw of The Guardian described the film as having "neither topical immediacy nor any real historical perspective and, burdened with pedantic and predictable flashbacks, it finally leads nowhere interesting at all."

In April 2017, Lee began discussions with Skydance Media to helm an action thriller film, Gemini Man, that follows a senior DIA official being hunted by a young clone of himself right as he is about to retire from the agency. Will Smith was cast in the lead role. In January 2018, Clive Owen and Mary Elizabeth Winstead had been cast as the antagonist and female lead respectively. The film was released on October 11, 2019, to negative reviews and flopped at the box office. Alissa Wilkinson of Vox wrote, "If Gemini Man is the future of big-budget filmmaking, I hope someone in Hollywood is getting worried." Peter Debruge of Variety wrote, "it was the script that never lived up to the promise of its premise."

In 2013, Lee began development on a film dramatising Joe Frazier and Muhammad Ali's heavyweight title fight, known as the Thrilla in Manila. The film was to be produced by Universal with a screenplay written by Peter Morgan, but Lee later put it on hold in 2014 in order to make Billy Lynn's Long Halftime Walk. In December 2015, it was announced that the project, tentatively titled Thrilla in Manila, now with Studio 8, would be his next film after Gemini Man. David Oyelowo and Ray Fisher were reportedly Lee's top choices for the leading roles of Frazier and Ali, respectively, and he hoped to film in 3D. Lee announced in November 2022 that he is working on a biopic on the life of Bruce Lee starring his son, Mason Lee. In July 2025, it was announced he would direct a new project called Old Gold Mountain. The film, ultimately titled Gold Mountain, began production in May 2026.

== Personal life ==
Lee lives in Larchmont, in Westchester County, New York, US, and in Taipei, Taiwan, with his wife, Jane Lin, a microbiologist at New York Medical College. Following Lee's graduation from the Tisch School of the Arts, New York University, he was a stay-at-home father for six years, supported by Lin, until he won the prize from Taiwan's Government Information Office to make his first film Pushing Hands (1991). Lee and Lin have two sons, including Mason. Lee is sometimes described as a naturalized US citizen but has said that he is a permanent resident of the United States. Lee has stated that he believes in the Taoist-Buddha.

== Filmography ==
Lee has been involved in the process of filmmaking in various capacities, though the highlight of his career and legacy is his directorial work. The following are Lee's various credits.

Year	Title	Director	Producer	Writer
1991	Pushing Hands	Yes	No	Yes
1993	The Wedding Banquet	Yes	Yes	Yes
1994	Eat Drink Man Woman	Yes	No	Yes
1995	Siao Yu	No	Yes	Yes
1995	Sense and Sensibility	Yes	No	No
1997	The Ice Storm	Yes	No	No
1999	Ride with the Devil	Yes	No	No
2000	Crouching Tiger, Hidden Dragon	Yes	Yes	No
2003	Hulk	Yes	No	No
2005	Brokeback Mountain	Yes	No	No
2007	Lust, Caution	Yes	Yes	No
2009	Taking Woodstock	Yes	Yes	No
2012	Life of Pi	Yes	Yes	No
2016	Billy Lynn's Long Halftime Walk	Yes	Yes	No
2019	Gemini Man	Yes	No	No
TBA	Gold Mountain	Yes	Yes	No

Lee also directed the commercial Chosen (2001).

Acting credits

Year	Title	Role	Notes
1993	The Wedding Banquet	Wedding guest	Cameo
1998	The Candidate	Hsu Giu Jing's childhood friend	
2003	Hulk	Hulk	Voice acting and motion capture
2007	Hollywood Chinese	Himself	Documentary

== Awards and honors ==
In 2003, Lee was ranked 27th in The Guardian's 40 best directors. In August 2007, Lee was named the 41st greatest director of all time in a poll by Total Film magazine. Lee has also received awards from the French Government including becoming a Knight of the French Ordre des Arts et des Lettres (2012). and a Knight of the French Legion of Honor (2021) In 2020 he received a BAFTA Fellowship for his Outstanding Contributions to British Cinema.

Lee has been nominated for nine Academy Awards, of which he has won Best Director for Brokeback Mountain and Life of Pi, becoming the first non-white director to win the prize. For The Wedding Banquet and Sense and Sensibility, Lee won the Golden Bear at the Berlin International Film Festival; for Brokeback Mountain and Lust Caution, he won the Golden Lion at the Venice Film Festival. Lee is one of four directors to win the Golden Lion twice and the sole filmmaker to have been awarded the Golden Bear twice. Lee has also been awarded Directors Guild of America Awards, Golden Globes and British Academy Film Awards, among others, and is the recipient of the Order of Brilliant Star, the second highest civilian honor bestowed by the government of Taiwan.

On November 30, 2021, Lee received the Presidential Culture Award in the arts and culture category from Taiwan's president Tsai Ing-wen. Lee received Japan's Praemium Imperiale in 2024.

Awards and nominations received by Lee' films
Year	Title	Academy Awards		BAFTA Awards		Golden Globe Awards	
Year	Title	Nominations	Wins	Nominations	Wins	Nominations	Wins
1993	The Wedding Banquet	1				1	
1994	Eat Drink Man Woman	1		1		1	
1995	Sense and Sensibility	7	1	12	3	6	2
1997	The Ice Storm			2	1	1	
2000	Crouching Tiger, Hidden Dragon	10	4	14	4	3	2
2005	Brokeback Mountain	8	3	9	4	7	4
2007	Lust, Caution			2		1	
2012	Life of Pi	11	4	9	2	3	1
Total		38	12	49	14	23	9

Directed Academy Award performances
Under Lee's direction, these actors have received Academy Award nominations for their performances in their respective roles.

Year	Performer	Film	Result
Academy Award for Best Actor
2005	Heath Ledger	Brokeback Mountain	Nominated
Academy Award for Best Actress
1995	Emma Thompson	Sense and Sensibility	Nominated
Academy Award for Best Supporting Actor
2005	Jake Gyllenhaal	Brokeback Mountain	Nominated
Academy Award for Best Supporting Actress
1995	Kate Winslet	Sense and Sensibility	Nominated
2005	Michelle Williams	Brokeback Mountain	Nominated

== Recurring collaborators ==
Lee has had a career-long collaboration with producer and screenwriter James Schamus and editor Tim Squyres. He has also worked several times with music composer Mychael Danna and twice with Danny Elfman. (Note: Danna was originally hired to score Hulk, but he was removed from the project, apparently at the request of the studio, and another composer completed the final score. Lee spoke publicly about this in 2012 at a director's roundtable, calling it the moment he regretted most in his career. Danna subsequently received his first Academy Award nomination and went on to win that award for scoring Life of Pi, his first reunion with Lee since that time.)
