= The Rain of Sorrow =

- Traditional Chinese: 煙雨濛濛
- Simplified Chinese: 烟雨濛濛
- Hanyu Pinyin: Yān Yǔ Méngméng
- Directed by: Wang Yin
- Screenplay by: Chou Hsu-chiang
- Based on: Fire and Rain by Chiung Yao
- Produced by: Chu Chin-ching
- Starring: Gua Ah-leh; Wang Yin; Wu Chia-chi; Yi Li; Lu Pi-yun
- Cinematography: Hu Chi-yuan
- Edited by: Wang Chao-hsi; Liang Yung-tsan
- Music by: Liu Hung-yuan
- Production company: Tien Nan Motion Picture Company
- Release date: October 29, 1965
- Running time: 110 minutes
- Country: Taiwan
- Language: Mandarin

The Rain of Sorrow is a 1965 Taiwanese film directed by Wang Yin, based on Chiung Yao's 1964 novel Fire and Rain. The film stars Wang Yin himself, as well as 21-year-old Gua Ah-leh in her acting debut.

Wang Yin handpicked Gua Ah-leh, a recent graduate of National Taiwan Academy of Arts (now National Taiwan University of Arts), from over a thousand candidates for the lead role. The film's other investors wanted a "sexier" bankable actress, but Wang wouldn't budge. Eventually Wang had to finance the film all by himself after other investors quit the project, but his selection proved brilliant. Gua Ah-leh won Golden Horse Award for Best Leading Actress for this film, and would go on to become one of the greatest actresses in the cinema of Taiwan.

== Cast ==
- Gua Ah-leh as Lu Yi-ping
- Wang Yin as Lu Chen-hua
- Lu Pi-yun as Hsueh-chin
- Wu Chia-chi as Ho Shu-huan
- Yi Li as Lu Ru-ping
- Chen Ying as Lu Meng-ping
- Chang Wen-hua as Lu Ehr-chieh
- Wei Shao-ming as Lu Ehr-hao
- Chou Mei-li as Fang Yu
- Ming Ko as Lu Yi-ping's mother
- Lin Wei-cheng as Ho Shu-huan's mother
- Chou Hsun as Ah-lan
- Lin Pin as Wei Shao-hsiung

== Awards and nominations ==
1966 4th Golden Horse Awards

- Won—Best Leading Actress (Gua Ah-leh)
- Won—Best Supporting Actress (Lu Pi-yun)

Gua at that time was the youngest Best Leading Actress winner in Golden Horse Awards history.
