= List of Kalamazoo College people =

This page lists notable alumni and former students, faculty, and administrators of Kalamazoo College.

== Alumni ==
=== Arts and letters ===
- Selma Blair, actress (graduated from the University of Michigan, but studied at Kalamazoo 1990–1992)
- Teju Cole, award-winning Nigerian American author
- Mark Crilley, comic book creator and children's book author/illustrator
- David France, journalist and author
- Holly Hughes, performance artist
- Quincy Isaiah (2017), actor best known for portraying Magic Johnson in the HBO series Winning Time: The Rise of the Lakers Dynasty
- Nagai Kafu, author
- Jordan Klepper (2001), comedian, The Daily Show
- Lisa Kron, 2015 Tony Award-winning (Fun Home) playwright and actress
- Don Lane, singer, entertainer, TV host
- William Malatinsky, author
- Julie Mehretu, artist, winner of MacArthur "Genius" Award
- Fern Persons (1933), actress
- Diane Seuss (1978), poet and educator, winner of the 2022 Pulitzer Prize for Poetry
- Dorothy B. Waage (1905–1997), numismatist
- Maynard Owen Williams, National Geographic correspondent
- Steven Yeun (2005), actor best known for portraying Glenn in The Walking Dead

=== Government ===
- Garry E. Brown, politician
- Darrin Q. Camilleri, member, Michigan House of Representatives
- Amy Courter, former national commander of the Civil Air Patrol
- Brandt Iden, member, Michigan House of Representatives
- Alexander Lipsey, Michigan politician
- Chokwe Lumumba, mayor of Jackson, Mississippi
- Gerald Ellis Rosen, United States District Court Judge
- Bradley A. Smith, former Chairman, Federal Election Commission
- David Tarnas, member, Hawaii House of Representatives
- Christopher P. Yates, judge, Michigan Court of Appeals, Michigan Court of Claims and Michigan Circuit Court

=== Business ===
- Harry Garland, entrepreneur
- Mark Spitznagel, hedge fund manager
- Jon Stryker
- Ty Warner, founder, Ty Inc. (Beanie Babies)

=== Academia ===
- Paula Arai, Buddhist studies scholar, researcher, and professor
- George C. Baldwin, theoretical and experimental physicist and professor at General Electric Company, Rensselaer Polytechnic Institute, and Los Alamos National Laboratory
- William F. DeGrado, professor of Pharmaceutical Chemistry at the University of California, San Francisco
- Kenneth G. Elzinga, economics professor at the University of Virginia
- Cassandra Fraser, chemistry professor at the University of Virginia, and a Fellow of the American Association for the Advancement of Science
- Thomas F. Gieryn, sociology professor at the University of Indiana known for developing the concept of "boundary work"
- David Heath, probabilist, known for developing the Heath–Jarrow–Morton framework to model the evolution of the interest rate curve
- Martin A. Larson, religion scholar
- Katheryn Edmonds Rajnak, theoretical physical chemist
- Tad Schmaltz, philosophy professor at the University of Michigan, early modern philosophy scholar
- Robert J. Shiller, winner of the 2013 Nobel Prize in Economics
- Floyd Wilcox, third president of Shimer College

=== Other ===
- Hannah P. Dodge, faculty of the Ladies' Department
- Fannie Ruth Robinson, college president, 1895
- John E. Sarno, innovator in back-pain therapy
- Madelon Stockwell, first woman to graduate from the University of Michigan
- David Hildebrand Wilson, founder and curator of Museum of Jurassic Technology
