= Hagop Sandaldjian =

Egyptian musician and sculptor (1931–1990)

- Born: 1931; Alexandria, Egypt
- Died: 1990; Los Angeles, California, US
- Education: Ippolitov-Ivanov Music College, Moscow's Komitas State Conservatory, Melikian Music College, Cairo Mekltitarist College
- Occupation: Artist
- Spouse: Venera Sandaldjian
- Children: 2

Hagop Sandaldjian (1931–1990) was an Egyptian-born Armenian American musician and microminiature sculptor. At the time of his death in 1990, Sandaldjian was one of only four living practitioners of microminiature, a rare Slavic specialty.

Sandaldjian has micro-miniature art pieces on display at the Museum of Jurassic Technology in Los Angeles, California., and his life was documented by Ralph Rugoff to accompany his exhibition at the Museum of Jurassic Technology.

Sandaldjian was a polyglot, proficient in Armenian, Russian, English, and Arabic.

== Career ==
Sandaldjian was born in Alexandria, Egypt, and went to the Soviet Union to study music in Yerevan, Armenia and in Moscow. After graduating from the Ippolitov-Ivanov Music College in 1955, he became a violinist, and taught music at a conservatory in Yerevan. Sandaldjian emigrated to the United States in 1980, but was required to leave behind his first collection of 18 miniature works. Over the next decade, he produced another 33 miniatures.

Sandaldjian's pieces were discovered by David Hildebrand Wilson, a MacArthur Fellow, who continues to oversee the standing exhibition. Sandaldjian's creations included a carving of Mount Ararat on a grain of rice, a crucifix in which a minute golden figure of Jesus hangs upon a cross made from a bisected strand of Sandaldjian's own hair, and recreations of Disney figures (Snow White and the Seven Dwarfs or Mickey Mouse, for example) or historical figures (such as Napoleon or Pope John Paul II) presented in the eye or on the tip of a needle.

"Working through the microscope requires not only control of the hand and of one's breathing, but of the entire nervous system," Sandaldjian commented. "The slightest misdirected movement can destroy the very form being shaped in a fraction of a second."

Working extremely slowly under a microscope, Sandaldjian employed self-made tools such as sharpened needles tipped with ruby or diamond dust, compiling his sculptures out of minuscule materials such as dust, lint, and hair. Even among the few practitioners of microminiature art, Sandaldjian was unusual in that he painted his work, using a single sharpened strand of hair as a brush. Sandaldjian would time his motions to come between his heartbeats, thus maximizing his control of his fingers. Those who saw Sandaldjian at work said that they could not tell when his hands moved.

As recounted in Lawrence Weschler's book Mr. Wilson's Cabinet of Wonder, Museum of Jurassic Technology founder David Hildebrand Wilson learned about Sandaldjian from a museum visitor, and began visiting him at his home in Montebello, California. Wilson, who described the artist as "a very calm man", eventually decided to give Sandaldjian a show at the museum, but when he called Sandaldjian to tell him, Wilson learned that the artist had died only 10 days earlier. Weschler also relates that his initial doubts about the veracity of the museum's Sandaldjian exhibit were allayed when he located Sandaldjian's son in Montebello, who confirmed details about how his father worked, and also told Wechsler about the tradition of microminiature art in Armenia. In 1982 he received a prize from the National Small Works Competition for his work "Wild Animals".

Sandaldjian's work has been covered in outlets such as the Wall Street Journal, "‘In Miniature’ Review: Let’s Get Small", among others, and the New York Times.

== Personal life ==
Sandaldjian is the second of three children (all born in Alexandria, Egypt). Hagop’s father, Khachig Sandaldjain, was an actor and played a role in soviet film Tjvjik.

In 1948 the family moved from Cairo to Yerevan, Armenia.

While young Hagop Sandaldjian developed a passion for music, and started playing the Violi, his father, upset about his son pursuing an unpromising career, smashed Hagop's first violin.

Sandaldjian then moved to Russia where he met his first wife, a young Russian woman, and got married during his thesis on music ergonomics at Ippolitov-Ivanov State Musical Pedagogical Institute in Moscow. After completing his thesis, Sandaldjian divorced his then wife, and moved back to Yerevan.

Sandaldjian eventually went on to meet young Venera (née Simonian), a musician in Armenia whom he married in 1960. They had two children.

In 1980 they moved to Los Angeles. Customs forced Sandaldjian to leave behind all his microminiature sculptures.

Sandaldjian was a grandfather of four, including Anahid Modrek. Sandaldjian took a piece of his first grandchild's, Aram's, hair and created multiple bird sculptures on the strand of hair. For his granddaughter, Anahid, he engraved a wish on his own strand of hair "May all your dreams come true" in dedication to her; he died after she was born.

== Sources ==
- Rugoff, Ralph (1996). The Eye of the Needle: The Unique World of Microminiatures of Hagop Sandaldjian 0964721511. West Covina, CA: Society for the Diffusion of Useful Information Press. ISBN 0-9647215-1-1.
