= Mr. Wilson =

Mr. Wilson may refer to:

- Mr. Wilson, the cantankerous, middle-aged next-door neighbor from the comic strip Dennis the Menace
- "Mr. Wilson," a song from John Cale's 1974 album Slow Dazzle
- David Wilson, curator of the Museum of Jurassic Technology the subject of Mr. Wilson's Cabinet of Wonder.

== See also ==
- List of people with surname Wilson
  - Harold Wilson (1916–1995), British prime minister, referred to as "Mr. Wilson" in the Beatles song "Taxman"
