= Martin Larsson =

Martin Larsson may refer to:

- Martin M. Larsson, Danish songwriter and producer
- Martin Larsson (footballer), Swedish former footballer who played as a defender
- Martin Larsson (guitarist) (born 1973), heavy metal musician
- Martin Larsson (skier) (born 1979), cross-country skier
- Martin Q Larsson (born 1968), Swedish composer and musician
- Martin Larsson, pro videogamer known as Rekkles

== See also ==
- Martin A. Larson (1897–1994), American populist religious freethinker and Christian historian
