= Killing of Alon Shamriz, Yotam Haim, and Samer Talalka =

2023 friendly fire incident

- Part of the Battle of Shuja'iyya during the Gaza war
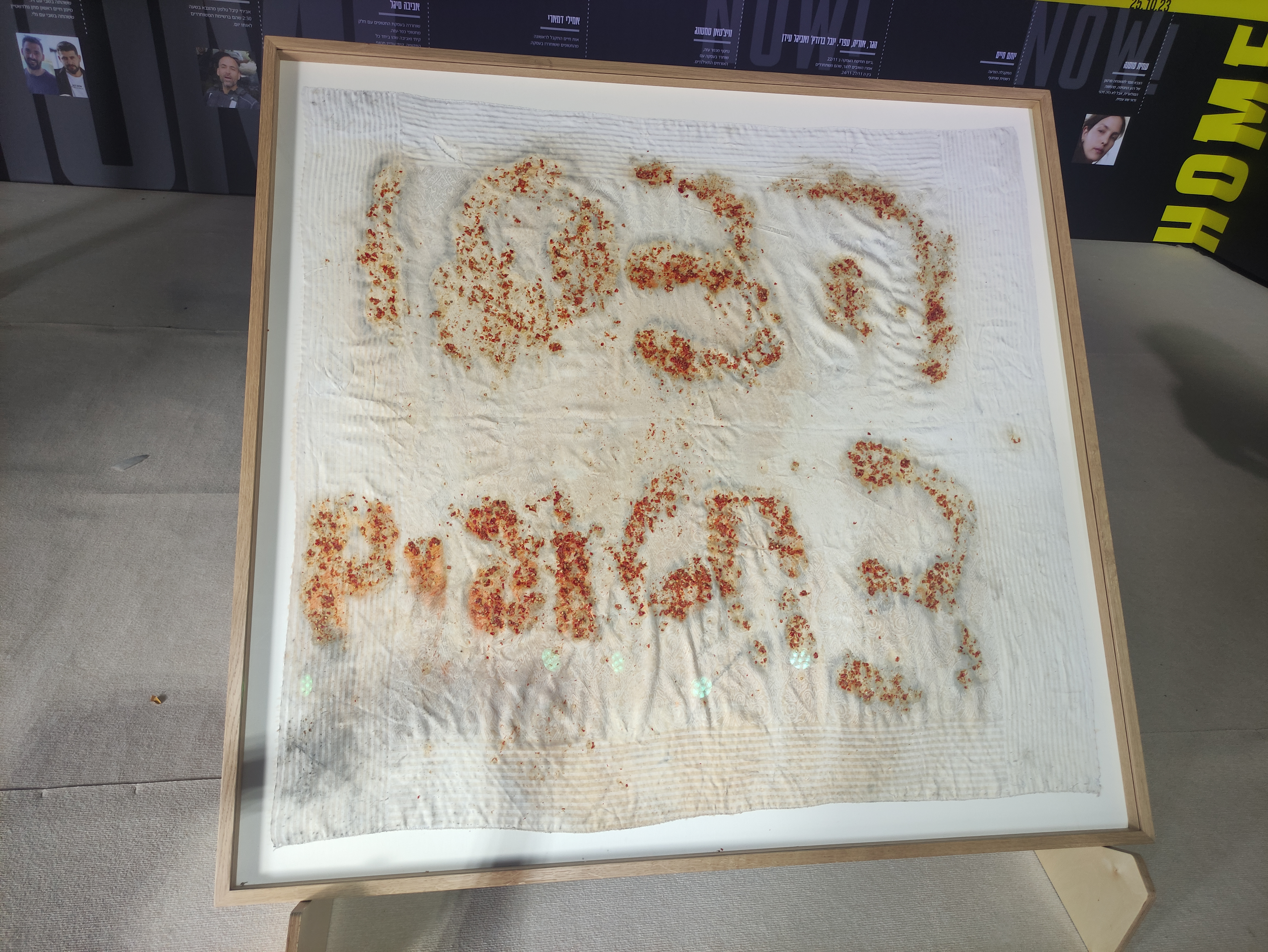
- Cloth that the three hostages wrote on in Hebrew using spices: "Rescue 3 abductees"; displayed as part of the "Through Their Eyes" exhibition in Kfar Aza.
- Location: Shuja'iyya, Gaza Strip
- Date: 15 December 2023; 2 years ago
- Attack type: Friendly fire
- Deaths: 3 Israeli hostages
- Perpetrator: Israel Defense Forces

On 15 December 2023, three Israeli hostages were killed by the Israel Defense Forces (IDF) during the Battle of Shuja'iyya in the Gaza Strip. The men had emerged from a building and were approaching a group of IDF soldiers when they were shot dead, in spite of the fact that they were shirtless and visibly unarmed while waving a makeshift white flag and calling out for help in Hebrew.

The incident provoked widespread domestic and international criticism of the IDF and of the Israeli government's attempts to resolve the hostage crisis through war. It also led to increased condemnation from abroad of the Israeli invasion of the Gaza Strip. The IDF acknowledged that the three hostages, who were kidnapped by Hamas during the 7 October attacks, had been killed after they were "mistakenly identified as a threat", prompting renewed protests in Israel against the incumbent Netanyahu-led government.

The killing of the hostages in Shuja'iyya marks one of many Israeli friendly fire incidents since the beginning of the Gaza war.

== Overview ==
=== Involved parties ===
The three hostages killed by the IDF were identified as Yotam Haim (Hebrew: יותם חיים; age 28), Alon Shamriz (Hebrew: אלון שמריז; age 26), and Samer Talalka (Hebrew: סאמר טלאלקה; Arabic: سامر تلالكا; age 24). Haim and Shamriz were kidnapped from the Kfar Aza kibbutz, and Talalka was kidnapped from the Nir Am kibbutz. All three men had been kidnapped during the October 7 attacks. Haim was a drummer for a heavy metal band, Shamriz was a computer engineering student at Sapir College. Talalka had been working in the kibbutz hatchery and was from the Bedouin town of Hura.

After the deaths of the three hostages, a GoPro camera from a deceased military dog was discovered to have recorded their voices several days earlier. The dog was involved with a military exchange between Israel and Hamas, near to where they were held although it was undisclosed what they were recorded speaking about. It has been inferred that the militants holding them were killed in the fighting and allowed the men to escape.

=== Events ===
According to an IDF official, the three male hostages emerged shirtless out of a building toward a group of IDF soldiers "tens of meters" away, with one carrying a white flag. An Israeli sniper then opened fire on them, killing Shamriz and Talalka and wounding Haim. After being shot, Haim ran into a nearby building and shouted for help in Hebrew. The battalion commander then ordered the troops to hold their fire, while Haim was persuaded to exit the building but when he did so 15 minutes later, a soldier acting against the battalion commander's order shot and killed him.

Haaretz reported that the IDF soldiers followed the third hostage into the building and shot him dead because: "they believed that it was a Hamas terrorist attempting to lure them into a trap". Yediot Ahronot reported that Israeli soldiers had called for the third hostage to come out of the building he was hiding in, and then shot him when he reappeared. The soldiers became suspicious upon retrieving the bodies for they had identifying marks suggesting that they were indeed Israeli hostages who had managed to evade their captors. The hostages were identified after their bodies were returned to Israel.

In days prior to the incident, soldiers had noticed the building the hostages were hiding in, 200 meters from where they would be eventually shot, had fabric signs reading "SOS" and "Help, Three hostages" hanging out of the windows. The letters were written on the fabric with leftover food. The IDF had marked the house as a possible trap. An investigation determined that when the unit which found the signs was redeployed from the area, it did not brief the battalion replacing them, whose troops were responsible for the incident, about the signs.

On 4 March 2024, Israeli broadcaster Kan 11 released an audio recording of the incident.

== Investigations ==
According to The Jerusalem Post, a preliminary investigation found IDF instructions to soldiers in Shuja'iyya were to open fire on any man of fighting age who approached them.

Following an investigation, the IDF stated the killings were preventable, but disciplinary actions were not needed since there was "no malice" on the part of the soldiers.

== Reactions ==
=== Israeli public ===
The mother of one of the deceased hostages sent a message to the unit involved in the shooting, stating she considered the incident not to be the soldiers' fault. She told the unit she instead placed the blame of her son's death on Hamas, adding: "may their name and memory be wiped off the face of the Earth". On the contrary, the father of one of the hostages stated: "The shooter should not have opened fire, and if he is a proper fighter, he should have known that you only pull the trigger once you are certain it is a terrorist". Despite this, he noted that Israeli troops: "have encountered different situations where [Hamas] tried to ambush them and they suffered losses".

Protests broke out outside the IDF headquarters in Tel Aviv following the news, calling for a negotiated end to the hostage crisis. Open University of Israel professor Yagil Levy said there was "a real gap between the formal rules of engagement and the practice on the battlefield", and Israeli journalist Nahum Barnea called the incident a war crime. Pro-Palestinian voices and critics of the IDF said that the incident demonstrated the Israeli military's indiscriminate use of force on civilians, seeing the soldiers as having mistaken the surrendering Israeli hostages for surrendering Palestinians. Sari Bashi, program director at Human Rights Watch (HRW), stated that "nobody batted an eye before killing them", and that this case only came under investigation as the deceased turned out to be Israeli. Roy Yellin of B'Tselem stated that his group had documented "countless incidents of people who clearly surrendered and who were still shot" and that the incident came after "a long trend of" escalating Israeli violence that went largely unpunished.

=== Israeli military and government ===
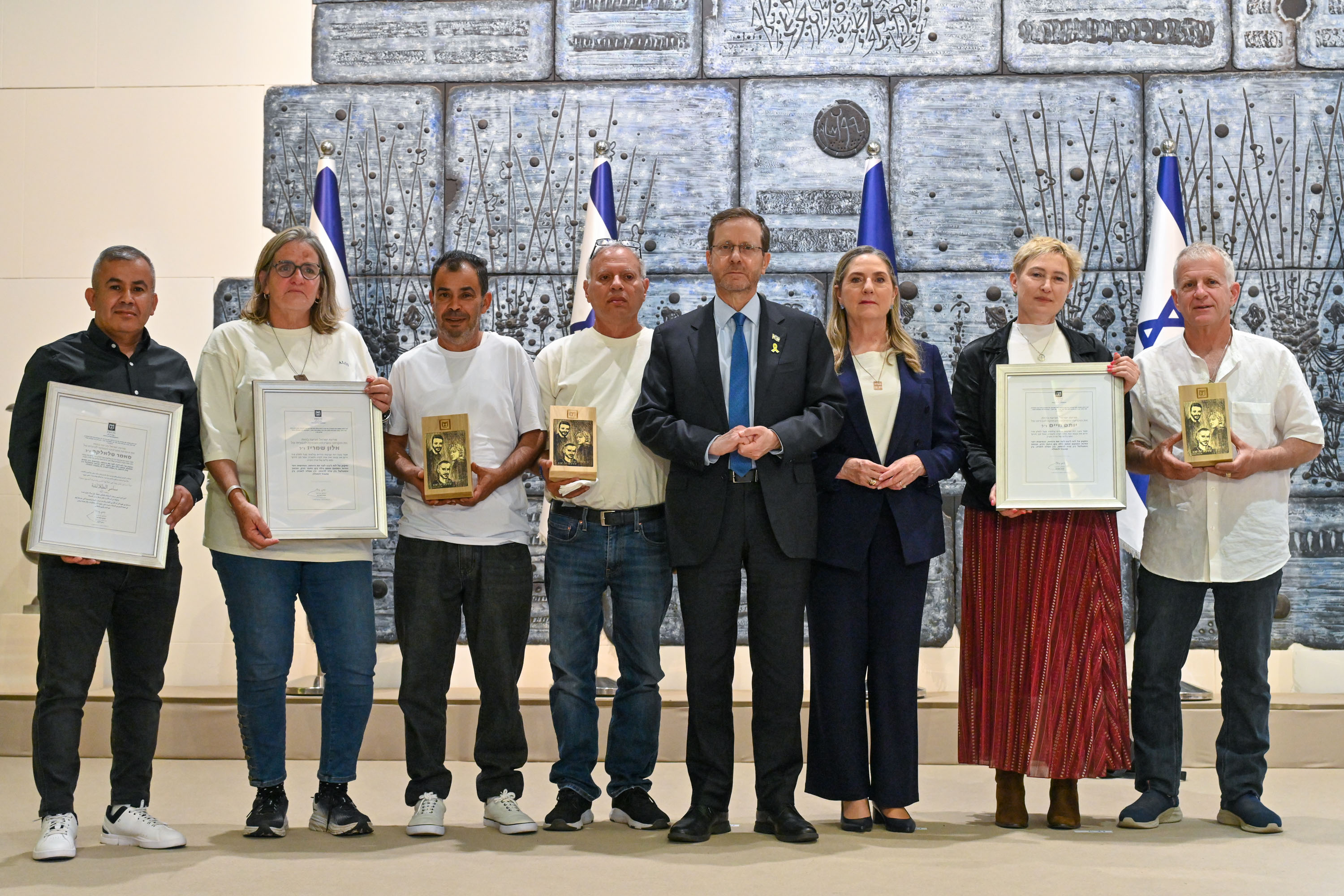
Israeli President Isaac Herzog with the deceased hostages' families during a memorial ceremony in April 2024.

Prime Minister Benjamin Netanyahu offered condolences to the families of the victims, while Defense Minister Yoav Gallant called the killings "a painful incident for every Israeli". Lt. Gen. Herzi Halevi stated that the shooting was against the IDF's rules of engagement and that the hostages had "done everything to show that they were harmless", including removing shirts to show that they were not carrying explosives. The following day, the IDF posted a video of him speaking to the 99th Division of the IDF, reminding them to not shoot surrendering Gazans but to take them as prisoners of war (POWs). Social media users pointed out that soldiers in the background of the video appeared nonchalant or were even laughing. On 15 December, the IDF stated that during operations in Shuja'iyya, they "mistakenly identified three Israeli hostages as a threat" and killed them with friendly fire. A senior IDF officer stated that:

"We have heard such screams from places in the past, and then there was fighting, after the alert turned out to be an attempt to draw IDF forces to a building and then open fire on them. Unfortunately, we thought it was such an incident."

When asked if the soldiers involved in the killing of the three hostages will be pulled from service, IDF spokesperson Lt. Col. Richard Hecht stated that they will be "supported in every way possible" as the incident was "terrible and tragic mistake". IDF spokesperson Lt. Col. Jonathan Conricus stated that no disciplinary action would be taken against the soldiers, and that there would be no change to IDF ground operations as a result of the killing.

== Depictions ==
In November 2025, Stay Forte, a film chronicling the story of the three hostages was released. Doron Eran directed the project, with Tomer Machloof playing Alon, Shahar Tavoch as Yotam Haim and Wael Hamdun as Samer Talalka, with American actors Judd Hirsch and Selma Blair as part of the cast.

== See also ==
- Killing of David Ben Avraham
- Killing of Nahida and Samar Anton
- Executions and assassinations during the Gaza war
- Timeline of the Israeli–Palestinian conflict in 2023
- Timeline of the Gaza war (24 November 2023 – 11 January 2024)
- Israeli war crimes in the Gaza war
- Gaza genocide
