= My Friend Steve =

My Friend Steve is a band hailing from Orlando, Florida fronted by vocalist Steven Foxbury (a.k.a. Steve Burry). They have earned comparisons to Counting Crows. "Charmed" was their only single which charted, released on their 1998 album Hope & Wait on Mammoth Records. The single appeared on Billboard's Modern Rock Tracks and Adult Top 40 charts, peaking at numbers 38 and 30, respectively.

The music video for "Charmed" features actress Selma Blair, as the song was the theme for Zoe, Duncan, Jack and Jane in which she starred. That same year, the band released a live performance version of its song "All in All" on the charity album Live in the X Lounge II.

In 2001, the band released the song "Smash Baby" on the Axis Magazine compilation of that year.

The band consisted of Steven Burry on vocals, Eric Steinberg, Dave McMahon, Pat Koch, Richie Noble, and drummer Eric Gardner.

They continue to release new music with the most recent being the EP’s “Four Songs” and “Live in the X -Lounge (both in 2020).

== Albums ==
=== Hope & Wait ===
Released October 6, 1998.

1. The Schooling
2. Charmed
3. Day Begun
4. All in All
5. Arnie
6. Better Left Behind
7. Newest Superhero
8. Lessening Mercies
9. Always the Way
10. Backwards And Sideways
11. Chandeliers
12. Carflips
