= Karen Zambos =

American fashion designer

- Occupation: Fashion designer

Karen Zambos is an American fashion designer based in Los Angeles, California. She designs her own clothing line called Karen Zambos Vintage Couture, as well as a belt collection called Elegantly Waisted. She also co-designs a handbag collection called Zambos & Siega.

Karen Zambos designs are very popular among celebrities such as Nicole Richie, Jessica Alba, Fergie, Kourtney Kardashian, Paris Hilton, Selma Blair and many others.
