= Stay Forte =

- Hebrew: תהיה חזק
- Directed by: Doron Eran
- Written by: Omri Rose; Tomer Almagor
- Produced by: Doron Eran; Tomer Almagor; Ron Zuckerman; Gabrielle Almagor
- Starring: Shahar Tavoch; Tomer Machloof; Wael Hamdun; Judd Hirsch; Selma Blair
- Cinematography: Danor Glazer
- Edited by: Yuval Orr
- Production companies: Urban Tales Productions; Cinemajet; Sarke Studio
- Distributed by: Urban Tales Productions (United States)
- Release dates: 16 November 2025 (Tel Aviv Cinematheque); 20 November 2025; (theatrical)
- Country: Israel
- Languages: Hebrew; Arabic; English

Stay Forte (Hebrew: תהיה חזק) is a 2025 Israeli drama film directed by Doron Eran. It deals with the Gaza war hostage crisis and is based on the stories of Alon Shamriz, Yotam Haim, and Samer Talalka. The three Israeli men were abducted to the Gaza Strip amid the 7 October attacks and later killed in friendly fire on 16 December 2023.

The film stars Shahar Tavoch, Tomer Machloof, Wael Hamdun as well as American actors Judd Hirsch and Selma Blair. It is among the first feature films to deal with the events of the Gaza war.

The film premiered at the Tel Aviv Cinematheque in Tel Aviv on 16 November 2025, followed by a nationwide theatrical release on 20 November 2025. It will be released theatrically in the United States in March 2026, preceded by a gala premiere in Los Angeles.

== Plot summary ==
On 7 October 2023, three men in Southern Israel are among 251 hostages abducted by Hamas and other Palestinian militant groups to the Gaza Strip.

The three men; Nadav (Tavoch), Oren (Machloof) and Alif (Hamdun) are desperate to escape the Gaza tunnels. They successfully escape the network but are tragically killed in an incident of friendly fire by IDF soldiers. Also being held with them is a Thai hostage named Chatri (Vongtama), with whom they communicate in English. The four suffer from appalling treatment from their captors, who abuse them physically and mentally.

== Cast ==
- Shahar Tavoch as Nadav Hai (based on Yotam Haim)
- Tomer Machloof as Oren Shamri (based on Alon Shamriz)
- Wael Hamdun as Alif Muhammad Talal (based on Samer Talalka)
- Judd Hirsch as an American hostage
- Selma Blair as an American hostage, inspired by Amit Soussana
- Stelio Savante
- Roy Vongtama as Chatri, Thai hostage
- Johnny Arbid

== Production ==
Eran chose to make the film based on a meeting he had with Yotam Haim's mother, Iris, where he learned more about the story of the three hostages.

The script is based on the testimony of Wichian Temthong, a Thai national that was also held hostage in Gaza.

Eran spoke about the film: "War is not just a battle between nations; it is a deep wound that scars humanity. Stay Forte is a reminder that behind every statistic are real lives forever changed. We must confront the true cost of conflict and strive for a world where understanding and compassion prevail over violence." Elsewhere Eran has said: "To me, the three hostages represent rare courage. The film is intended to immortalize their unimaginable story and no less to tell the world about the challenges and pain that the citizens of the State of Israel have been facing over the past year."

Hirsch spoke about his experience and commitment to the project: "I’m honored to be a part of this very important project. It is one of the most moving experiences of my whole life. To participate in sharing this story with the world is something so personally important to me." Hirsch's character is inspired by the stories of two American hostages held in Gaza.

Blair also spoke about the film in statement: "This film is not just a narrative; it’s a testament to the resilience of the human spirit and the bonds that unite us against unimaginable tragedy, and added “I am honored to be part of this journey, which truly reflects the diverse fabric of Israeli society—people of many religions caught in the crossfire of conflict.”

=== Filming ===
Filming began in Tbilisi, Georgia in late 2024 with US producers, with additional filming taking place in the United States. Extensive filming took place in the tunnels beneath Georgian Technical University.

The mother of Yotam Haim and the family of Alon Shamriz were on set during filming, comforting the actors during painful scenes and were consulted throughout and approved scripts. Eran also met with the Talalka family and shared the script.

=== Post-production ===
Eran requested for financial assistance from Israel's Ministry of Foreign Affairs for the film's distribution and marketing in the United States. The Ministry's tender committee approved the request on 16 October 2025, providing $230,000 USD in support.

== Release ==
The film premiered at the Tel Aviv Cinematheque in Tel Aviv on 16 November 2025 with the actors and families of the hostages in attendance. This was followed by a nationwide theatrical release on 20 November 2025.

In order to qualify for awards, it began showing at Laemmle Theatres in Los Angeles in December 2025. It will receive a wider theatrical release in the United States in March 2026, preceded by a gala premiere in Los Angeles.

== Reception ==
Hannah Brown of The Jerusalem Post praised the film: "The three actors in the main roles all give excellent performances and work well together." Brown concluded that "Stay Forte makes a strong case for us to look closely at this tragedy and not avert our eyes from it, and because the filmmakers created these memorable characters, we can pay tribute to these three very brave and resourceful young men."

Sharon Golan Meiri of Mako gave the film 4 out of 5 stars: "It is a moving film, which illustrates the horror of captivity through excellent acting performances and well-researched locations."

Iris Haim, mother of Yotam Haim, praised the film following a special screening for the families of the hostages: "I'm proud. I'm leaving here with great pride. I really see this as a super important document for our country and the nations of the world, who understood the most important thing, that our children are heroes."
