= Selma Blair =

American actress (born 1972)

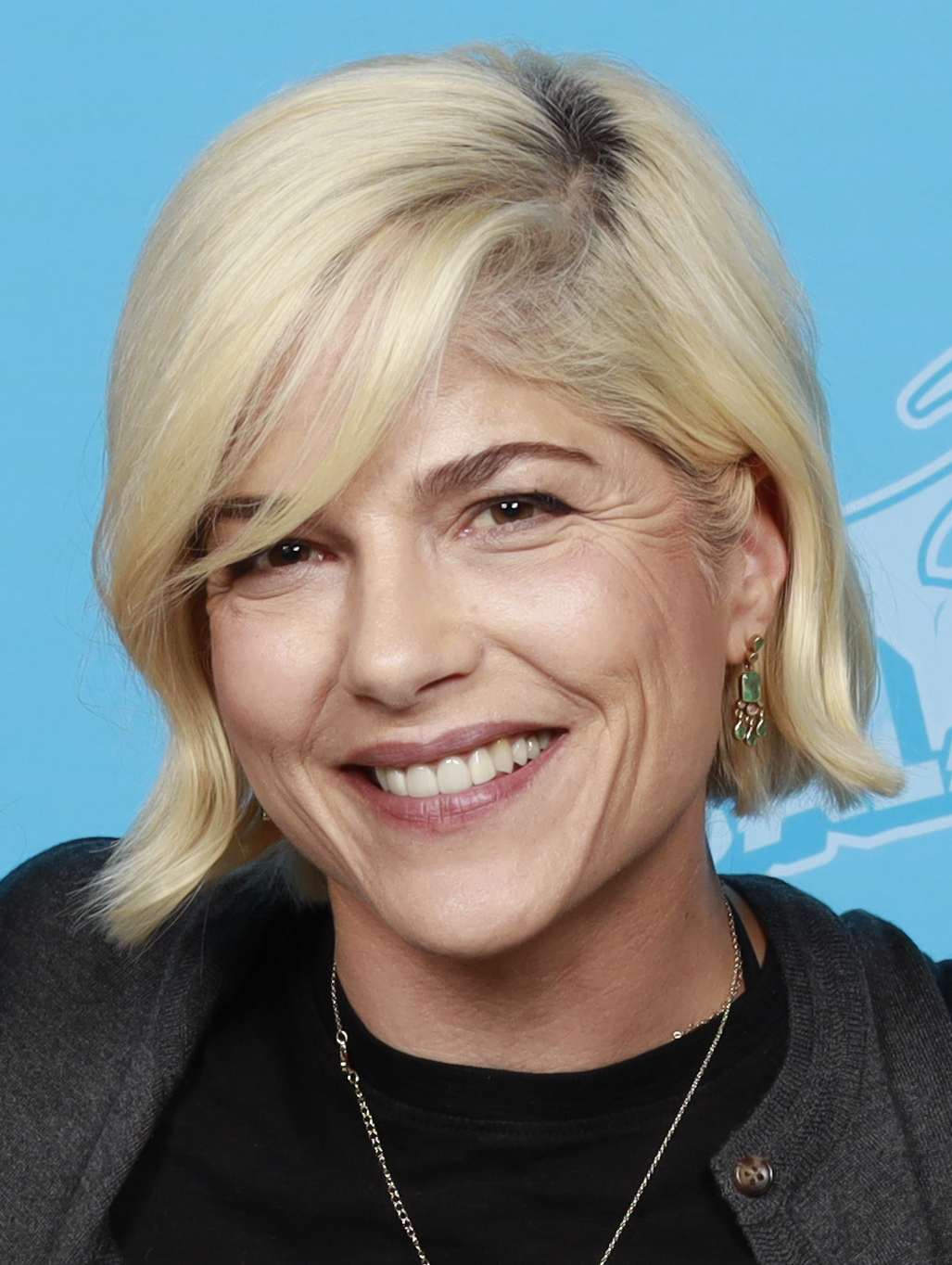
- Blair in 2024
- Born: Selma Blair Beitner; June 23, 1972 (age 54); Southfield, Michigan, U.S.
- Education: New York University; University of Michigan (BA)
- Occupation: Actress
- Years active: 1990–present
- Spouse: Ahmet Zappa (m. 2004; div. 2006)
- Partner: Jason Bleick (2010–2012)
- Children: 1

Selma Blair Beitner (born June 23, 1972) is an American actress. She is known for her roles in Cruel Intentions, Legally Blonde, The Sweetest Thing, and the Hellboy franchise.

Blair, born in Southfield, Michigan, emerged from a background in legal and political involvement: both her parents were lawyers and her father was active in the U.S. Democratic Party. Blair's upbringing was predominantly Jewish. She initially pursued photography at Kalamazoo College before moving to New York to become involved in the arts, graduating from the University of Michigan. Blair's early career was marked by numerous auditions to land her first roles in television and film, with her breakthrough in Cruel Intentions and subsequent mainstream success in projects like Legally Blonde and Hellboy.

After being diagnosed with multiple sclerosis (MS) in 2018, she has shared her experience with the condition, contributing to her advocacy work. In 2021, Blair starred in Introducing, Selma Blair, a documentary about her life since being diagnosed with MS. Her autobiography, Mean Baby: A Memoir of Growing Up, was published by Knopf in 2022.

== Early life and education ==
Selma Blair Beitner was born on June 23, 1972, in the Detroit suburb of Southfield, Michigan, the youngest of four daughters of Molly Ann Cooke and Elliot I. Beitner. Her maternal grandfather was the founder of Penn Fruit and she spent a great deal of her childhood in Philadelphia. Both of her parents were lawyers; her father was a labor arbitrator and was active in the U.S. Democratic Party until his death in 2012; her mother died in 2020. Her parents divorced when Blair was 23. Selma and her sister Elizabeth officially changed their surname to "Blair"; in her memoir, Blair wrote that, following a concerted effort on the part of her father's girlfriend to derail her career, she did not speak to her father for 12 years.

Blair's father and maternal grandfather were Jewish; her mother and her Scottish maternal grandmother were Anglican, but Selma and her sisters had a Jewish upbringing and Selma formally converted to Judaism in the second grade. Her Hebrew name is 'Bat-Sheva'.

Blair attended Hillel Day School in Farmington Hills, and Cranbrook Kingswood in Bloomfield Hills. She then spent two years (1990–1992) studying photography at Kalamazoo College.

At age 21, Blair moved to New York City, where she lived at The Salvation Army. Intending to become a photographer, she attended New York University (NYU), and took acting classes at the Stella Adler Conservatory, the Column Theater, and Stonestreet Studios. She returned to Michigan, transferred from NYU to the University of Michigan and, in 1994, graduated magna cum laude with a triple major in photography, psychology, and English. She then returned to New York City to pursue a career in the arts.

== Career ==
=== 1990–1998: Career beginning ===
In 1990, during her time at Cranbrook Kingswood, Blair was involved in a production of T. S. Eliot's Murder in the Cathedral. She considered it a failure, but her English teacher told her not to give up; that was the first time she thought she could be an actress. In 1993 in New York, an agent discovered her in an acting class and Blair signed with her. After 75 auditions, Blair got her first acting job, a TV ad for the Theater of Virginia.

Blair won her first professional role in a 1995 episode of the children's sitcom The Adventures of Pete & Pete. In 1996, she landed her first feature film role in the comedy The Broccoli Theory. In 1997, she made her first appearance in a mainstream feature film, the comedy In & Out. She auditioned six times for the role and remained on-set for several weeks, but most of her scenes were cut from the film's final version.

Her first lead role was in the film Strong Island Boys. She then won the lead in the 1997 fantasy film Amazon High. The film, which was proposed as a third show set in the Hercules and Xena mythological genre, did not air, but portions of it were used in the 2000 Xena: Warrior Princess episode "Lifeblood". She was considered for the role of Joey Potter in Dawson's Creek, a role which ultimately went to Katie Holmes. She subsequently appeared in several independent and short productions, including the award-winning Debutante.

=== 1999–2004: Breakthrough and mainstream success ===
Blair achieved her breakthrough in the 1999 coming-of-age drama Cruel Intentions. It received mixed reviews, with Variety finding "newcomer" Blair "too broad" and "overdoing [her role]'s clumsiness". The film made US$75.9 million internationally and brought Blair a nomination for the MTV Movie Award for Best Breakthrough Performance, and a win for "Best Kiss", shared with co-star Sarah Michelle Gellar. Cruel Intentions has since developed a cult following.

In 1999, Blair starred as Zoe Bean on Zoe, Duncan, Jack and Jane, and was nominated for the Teen Choice Awards for "TV – Breakout Performance". In 2000, following her performance in the teen comedy Down to You, Blair won the Young Hollywood Award for "Exciting New Face". In 2000 and 2002, Blair was included in Vanity Fair's "Hollywood's Next Wave of Stars" issues.

Blair co-starred in the 2001 hit comedy Legally Blonde, portraying a preppy, snobby law student; The Hollywood Reporter found her to be a "strong presence" in her role. The film topped the US box office in its opening weekend; it grossed US$96.5 million in North America and US$141.7 million worldwide. She next starred as a college student having an affair with her professor in the 2001 independent drama Storytelling. It premiered at the 2001 Cannes Film Festival; SPLICEDwire cited Blair and co-star Leo Fitzpatrick for "painfully authentic performances as an emotionally insecure coed and her cerebral palsy-stricken dorm neighbor and lover". In its review, View Auckland noted: "The acting, throughout, is excellent, with Selma Blair giving a mature performance that suggests better roles await her than those she's had so far." Blair next appeared in the 2002 comedy The Sweetest Thing. While the film was generally panned, it grossed US$68.6 million worldwide. Blair appeared with her co-starts from the film on the cover of Rolling Stone and was nominated for the Teen Choice Award for Choice Movie Actress – Comedy for her work in the film.

In 2004, Blair took on the role of Liz Sherman, a depressed pyrokinetic superhero, in Guillermo del Toro's blockbuster fantasy film Hellboy, co-starring Ron Perlman. Based on Mike Mignola's popular comic book series, the film was favorably received by critics; The New York Times remarked: "Blair's heavy-lidded eyes seem to be at half mast from some lovely lewd fantasy. With her sleepy carnality and dry, hesitant timing, she is a superb foil for Mr. Perlman's plain-spoken bravado." Hellboy topped the box office in the U.S. and Canada in its opening weekend, and ultimately grossed US$99.3 million.

Also in 2004, Blair played the role of an exhibitionist dancer in John Waters' satirical sex comedy A Dirty Shame, alongside Tracey Ullman. The film received a mixed response; A.V. Club described the production as a "proud retreat back into the sandbox of sexual juvenilia" and a "potty-mouthed manifesto from an elder statesman of shock", while pointing out that Blair and Ullman "throw themselves headfirst into the insanity, reveling in the forfeiture of dignity, self-respect, and self-consciousness their roles demand". Blair also took part on the social project The 1 Second Film as a producer, and was included on the FHM list of "The 100 Sexiest Women of 2004".

=== 2005–2011: Independent films and The Diary of Anne Frank ===
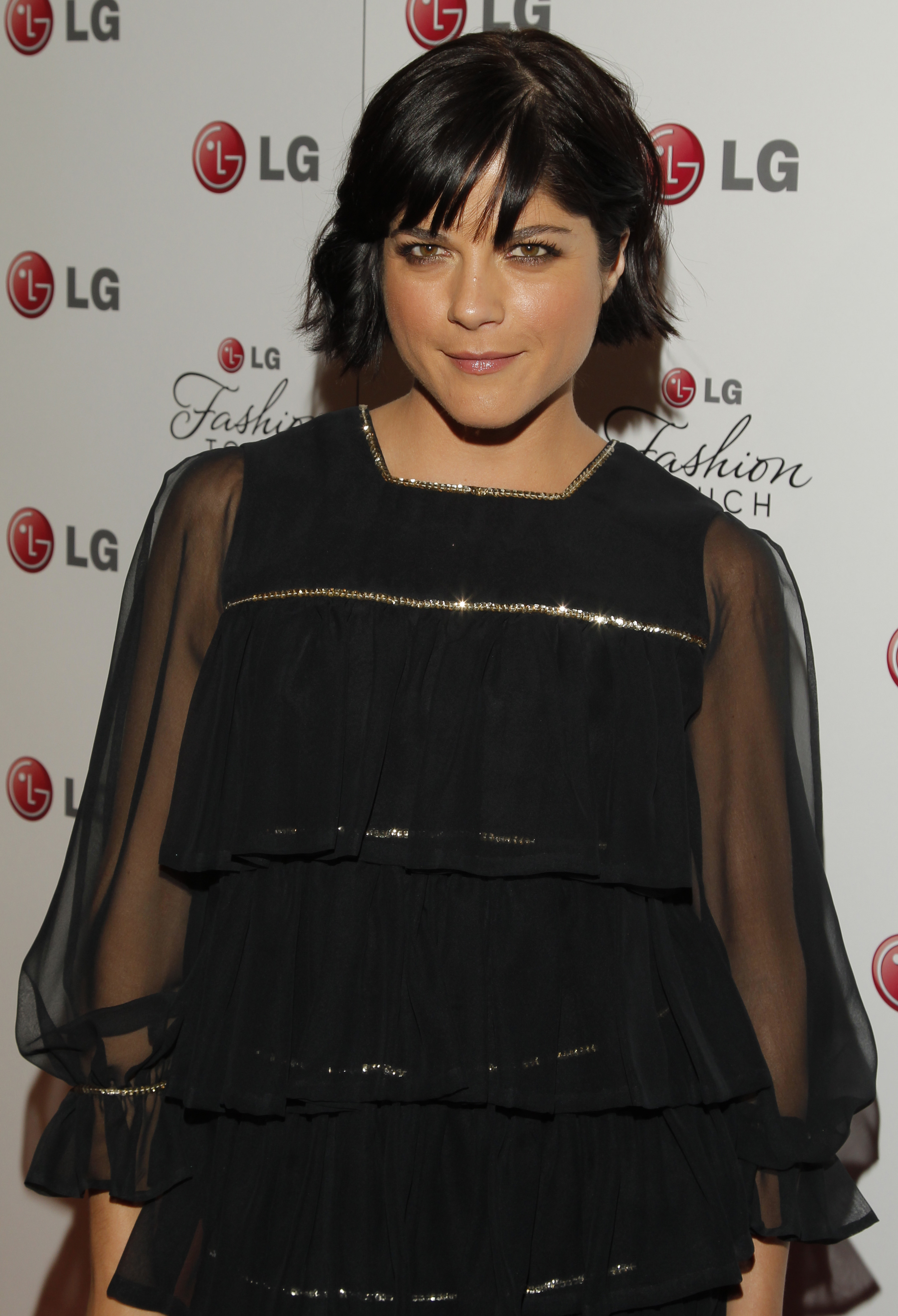
Blair in May 2010

From 2005 to 2007, Blair appeared in a string of independent films. In 2008, she reprised her role of Liz Sherman in Hellboy II: The Golden Army, where her character had a larger role than its predecessor. The film garnered largely positive reviews from critics and became a worldwide commercial success, grossing US$160 million. Blair was nominated for the Scream Awards for Best Actress in a Fantasy Movie or TV Show.

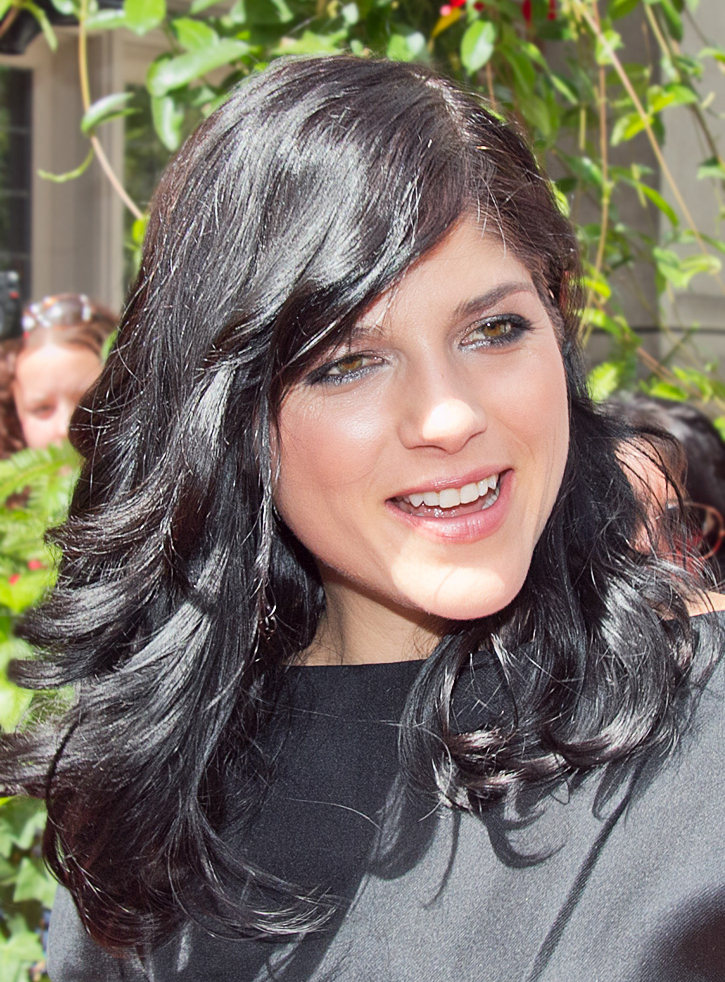
Blair at the 2011 Toronto International Film Festival

In 2008, Blair starred as a drug-addicted and alcoholic mother in Lori Petty's independent drama The Poker House. It received generally favorable reviews from critics, with The Hollywood Reporter considering Blair's performance one of her best.

Also in 2008, Blair accepted the titular role on the NBC sitcom Kath & Kim. The sitcom, which was based on the Australian television series of the same name, was cancelled after one season.

In 2009, Blair returned to the stage when she took on the lead role of Kayleen in Rajiv Joseph's Gruesome Playground Injuries. In 2010, Blair lent her voice to narrate the audiobook of The Diary of a Young Girl: The Definitive Edition, originally written by Holocaust victim Anne Frank. Her performance received a 2011 Grammy Award for Best Spoken Word Album for Children nomination.

=== 2012–present: Film and television ===
In 2012, Blair returned to television as the female lead with the premiere of FX's Anger Management, co-starring Charlie Sheen. She starred in 53 episodes as Dr. Kate Wales, Sheen's neurotic therapist and love interest. The series premiered to mixed critical reviews, but broke ratings records with 5.74 million viewers in its debut and ranks as the most-watched sitcom premiere in cable history. Blair left the show in June 2013, during the shooting of the second season, due to disagreements with Sheen, who fired her via text message.

In 2012, Blair narrated Xfinity TV commercials, including the London 2012 Olympics ads. In 2014, she obtained her first television role since Anger Management when she was cast as Joanna in the Amazon's comedy pilot Really. The pilot was not picked up but, in February 2016, Blair co-starred in the FX miniseries American Crime Story: The People vs. O. J. Simpson.

In October 2012, Blair starred in the political satire sketch The Woman for Romney, about the campaign proposals of Mitt Romney, former Republican Party nominee for the 2012 United States presidential election.

In 2018, Blair was cast in a recurring role on the Netflix science-fiction drama series Another Life; it ran from 2019 to 2021 before being canceled.

In September 2022, Blair became a contestant on season 31 of Dancing with the Stars but left in the fifth week of the competition because of her deteriorating health.

Her next film role is in the Israeli project Stay Forte by Doron Eran. The film focuses on Alon Shamriz, Yotam Haim, and Samer Talalka, three Israeli men taken hostage by Hamas during the October 7 attacks on Israel. They were mistakenly identified as a threat by Israeli soldiers during fighting in northern Gaza and killed. The film went into production in late 2024, with filming taking place in Georgia.

== Fashion ==
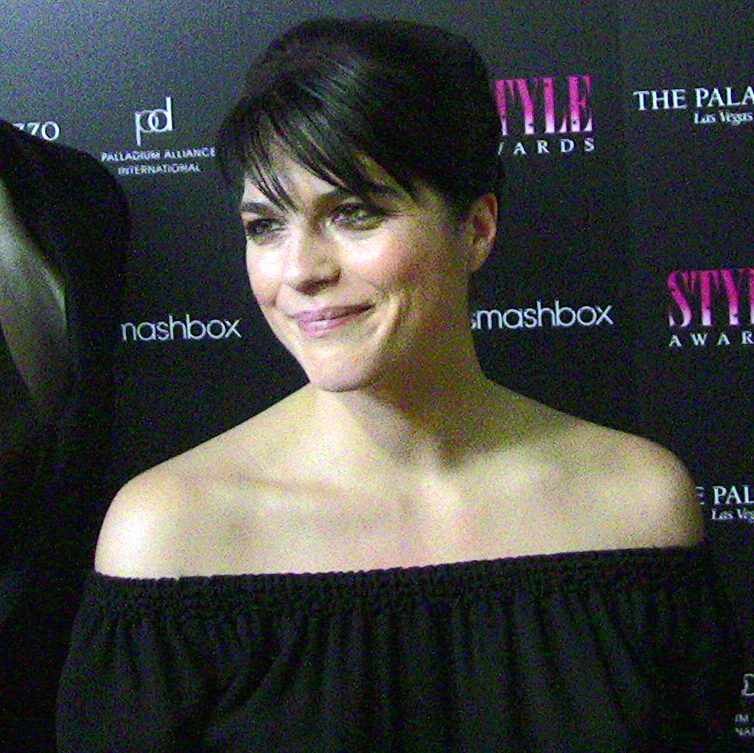
Blair at the 2011 Hollywood Style Awards

Blair is known for her fashion-forward style, and for her frequent radical hairstyle changes. She lent her image to the Marc Jacobs-Brian Bowen Smith clothing line, and has worked with several other fashion designers, including Karen Zambos, Martin Margiela, Isaac Mizrahi, Reinaldo Herrera, and Stella McCartney.

She was featured in the 2002 Pirelli Calendar, and, in 2005, appeared in The New York Times Magazine award-winning photography gallery, "The Selma Blair Witch Project: Fall's Dark Silhouettes Have a Way of Creeping Up on You" by the art photographer Roger Ballen, at the Palau Robert in Barcelona in 2012.

Blair also appeared with Rainn Wilson singing "Baby, It's Cold Outside" for the 2008 Gap winter ad campaign, and was included in Glamour's list of the 50 Most Glamorous Women of 2008.

In 2010, Blair posed with Demi Moore and Amanda De Cadenet for a spread in Harper's Bazaar magazine. In 2012, she became the spokesperson for, and first actress to appear on, the "Get Real For Kids" campaign. In the spring of that year, she released SB, a line of handbags and wallets which she designed.

She has appeared on covers and photo spreads of other magazines, including CR Fashion Book magazine in February 2016. In 1999, she appeared in Seventeen, and in subsequent years, in Vanity Fair, Marie Claire, Vogue, Glamour, Rolling Stone, The Lab Magazine, Interview, Dazed & Confused, Hunger, and Elle. She has been the face of fashion houses Chanel, Miu Miu and GAP. She presented parts of the collection of Christian Siriano at a celebration of his 10th stage anniversary at Masonic Hall during New York Fashion Week 2018. In 2020, she appeared as a judge on a Project Runway special.

== Activism ==
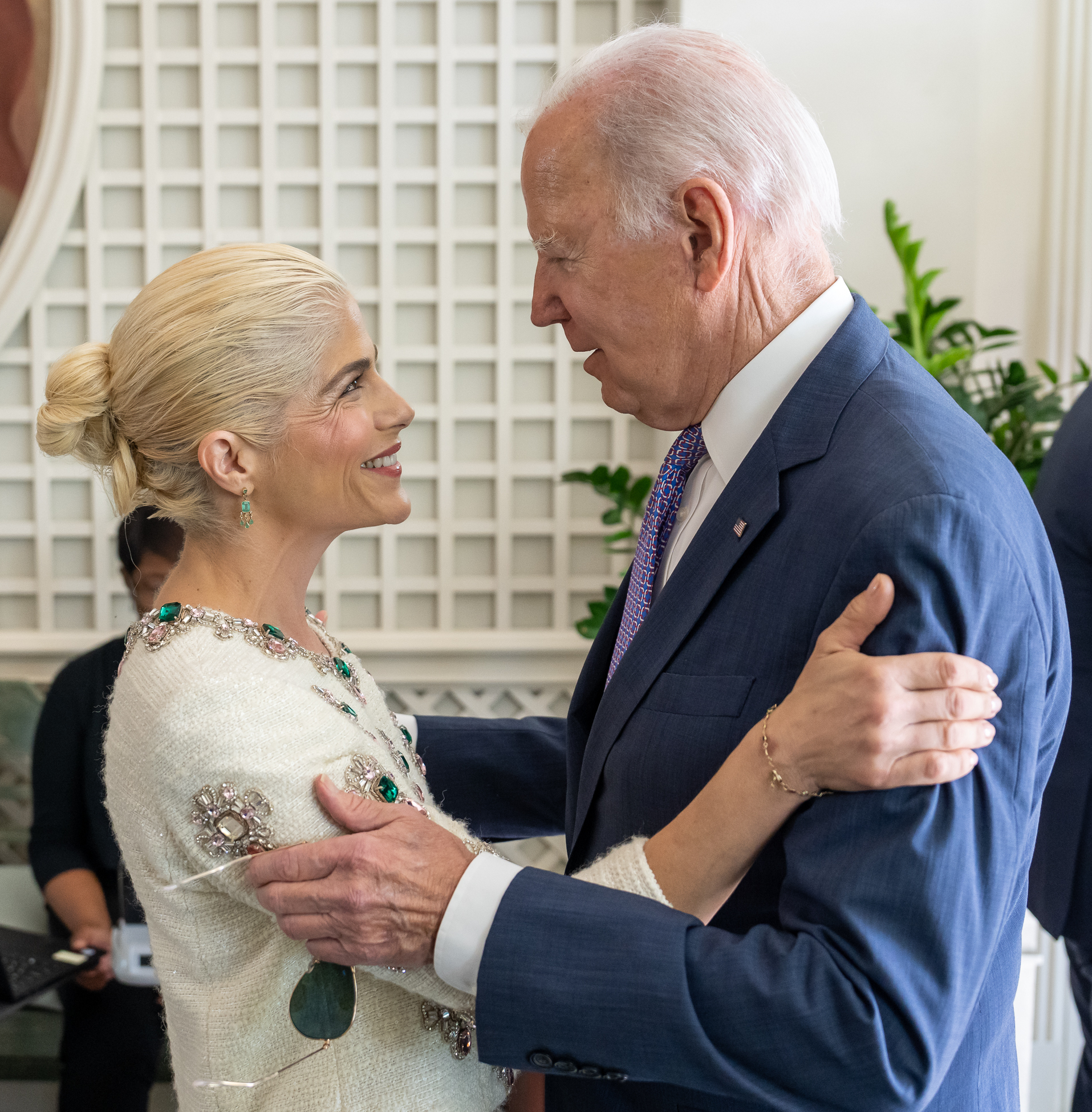
Blair with Joe Biden at the White House in October 2023

On May 27, 2012, Blair was a special guest at the National Memorial Day Concert at the U.S. Capitol in Washington, DC. She presented the story of Brigette Cain, a war widow who lost her husband (Pfc. Norman L. Cain III) in Afghanistan.

Blair supported Marianne Williamson for the 2014 congressional elections.

Blair's charity work and philanthropic causes include Marc Jacobs' Skin Cancer Awareness Campaign, H&M's Fashion Against AIDS 2011 Campaign, Children's Action Network, AmFAR AIDS Research 2011, Lange Foundation (dedicated to saving homeless and abandoned animals), Bulgari-Save the Children 2012 Ad Campaign, No Kid Hungry, Staying Alive Foundation and the National Multiple Sclerosis Society. On October 2, 2015, she received the Universal Smile Award during THE SMILE GALA LA 2015 to benefit children with cleft lip and palate. She was included as one of the Silence Breakers selected as the 2017 Time Person of the Year. In December 2021, Michelle Pfeiffer presented Blair with the Equity in Entertainment Award at the Power 100 Women ceremony.

In June 2022, Blair became chief creative officer of Guide Beauty, a company which creates cosmetic products for those with mobility challenges. In December 2022 she was chosen as one of the BBC's 100 women.

=== Israel ===
In May 2021, during the 2021 Israel–Palestine crisis, Blair signed an open letter by the pro-Israel organization Creative Community for Peace (CCFP) calling for "peace, balanced discourse and an end to inflammatory one-sided accounts" of the Israeli–Palestinian conflict.

In October 2023, in the immediate aftermath of the October 7 attacks, Blair expressed solidarity with Israel. During the Gaza war, she has signed CCFP open letters supporting Israel's inclusion in the Eurovision Song Contest and one calling for Palestinian journalist Bisan Owda's Emmy nomination for her Al Jazeera Media Network show It's Bisan from Gaza and I'm Still Alive to be rescinded.

In September 2024, Blair again expressed support for Israel and the hostages being held by Hamas in Gaza: "I stand with Israel. I stand with the hostages. I stand with their families — mothers, sisters, friends. These are innocent people who have been in hell and then murdered." She added that the enclave was being run by "Jihadists, the radicals, the extreme" and "terrorists".

In November 2025, Blair told Israel's Ynet that October 7, 2023, was a turning point for her, convincing her to return to acting and star in an Israeli film about the hostage crisis. In December 2025, Blair, who plays a hostage in the film, titled Stay Forte, told United Press International that the story was "not political," and added that "They're stories of human tragedy and empathy, that you want to be a part of that telling, it was one small way I could say it as an artist, not from any political front and just as a human."

==== February 2024 remarks on Islam ====
In February 2024, Blair posted a comment on an Instagram video related to the Gaza war. In the comment, she wrote regarding Representatives Cori Bush and Rashida Tlaib, "Deport all these terrorist supporting goons. Islam has destroyed Muslim countries and then they come here and destroyed minds. They know they are liars. Twisted justifications. May they meet their fate." The comment was criticized as Islamophobic, prompting Blair to delete it and issue a statement apologizing for her remarks. She subsequently cut ties with Creative Artists Agency, as well as her publicity team and lawyer.

In October 2026, at the Anti-Defamation League State of the Arts Reception in New York City, Blair announced she would be making a documentary on antisemitism titled Hineni to say what she "couldn't say two years ago" when apologizing for her comments. In her speech, she said the backlash was a "heartbreaking" experience that made her feel "erased". She said regarding the fallout over the incident:

The brands I worked with were gone within a day. A few partnerships I'd spent years building were shelved. My agency was gone. My lawyer was gone. My publicist was gone. My book agent was gone. My book publicist was gone. My social media manager was gone. My son's godmother was gone – my best friend. While some friends in the business quietly stood by me, most of them were gone. And of course, my manager, my supposed friend of thirty years, and a Jew, was gone too. I still don't know what any of them were thinking. No one returned my calls. I know the phone stopped. Not rang less. Just stopped.

In her speech, Blair also compared the response to her remarks to the treatment of Javier Bardem, who has supported calls for Pink to be removed as UNICEF ambassador. Pink had received backlash for sharing a post from pro-Israel group StopAntisemitism that criticized Macklemore for supporting Palestinians while touring with Ed Sheeran. Blair said, "Nothing will happen to [Bardem]. He'll keep working. He'll keep getting applauded. I made one post, apologized right away, and lost, overnight, everything I'd spent my adult life building."

== Personal life ==
=== Relationships ===
On January 24, 2004, Blair married writer and producer Ahmet Zappa at Carrie Fisher's home in Beverly Hills, California. They lived in Los Angeles in a 1920s-era home they bought for $1.35 million. She filed for divorce from Zappa on June 21, 2006, citing "irreconcilable differences". The divorce became final in December 2006.

Blair has dated actors Jason Schwartzman and David Lyons. From 2008 to 2010, she dated her Kath and Kim co-star Mikey Day.

In 2010, Blair began dating fashion designer Jason Bleick; they have a son, Arthur Saint Bleick. In September 2012, they announced that they had separated.

In March 2022, Blair and her ex-boyfriend, filmmaker Ron Carlson, whom she had been seeing since 2017, requested temporary restraining orders against each other, with both claiming physical abuse. The order requests were mutually dismissed in September 2022.

As of October 2026, Blair is in an on-again, off-again relationship with Andy Kiernan, a businessman and co-founder of The Kiernan Group. Blair went public with the relationship in July 2024.

=== Flight incidents ===
In June 2016, Blair was hospitalized following a drunken outburst on a flight from Cancún to Los Angeles. She apologized for the incident in a statement to Vanity Fair, saying, "After a lovely trip with my son and his Dad, I mixed alcohol with medication, and that caused me to black out and led me to say and do things that I deeply regret." That October, she said the incident was "horrible and frightening and I had empathy for myself actually afterwards because it was actually so out of character for me, especially because I'm a mother."

On October 11, 2026, Blair was taken into custody and hospitalized following a physical confrontation on a Delta Air Lines flight where she allegedly bit a flight attendant while aboard Flight 938 from Los Angeles to New York City. She was also alleged to have kicked a Port Authority police officer and assaulted a nurse at the hospital. Blair was later released from custody on a bail of $20,000, and has to return to court in January 2027. If convicted, she could spend two to seven years in prison for the assault.

=== Health issues ===
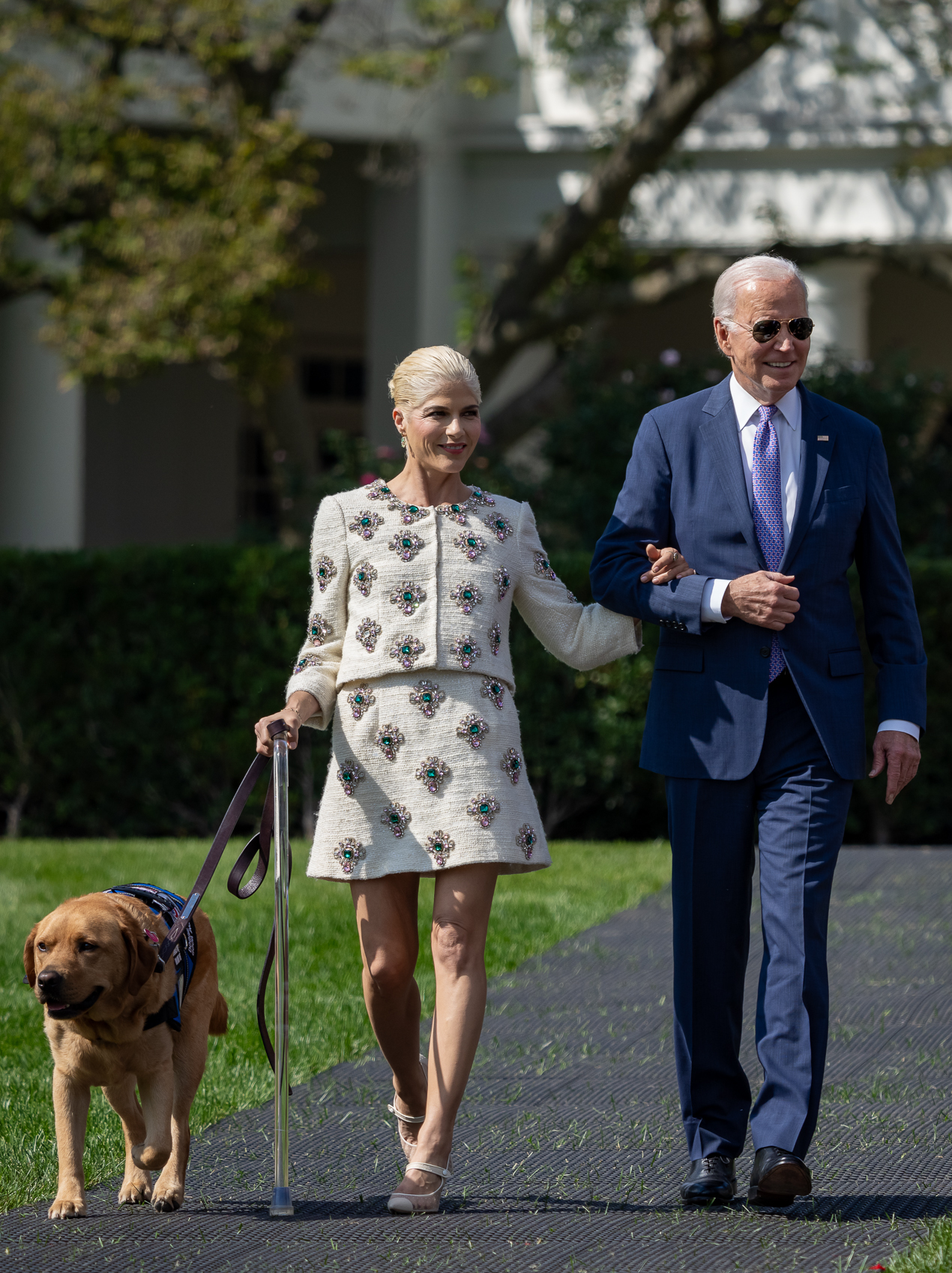
President Joe Biden and Selma Blair arrive at an Americans with Disabilities Act (ADA) reception on October 2, 2023, at the White House

In October 2018, Blair revealed that she had been diagnosed with multiple sclerosis (MS) in August of that year. In an April 2023 interview with British Vogue, Blair said that her symptoms had begun to manifest themselves when she was a child, and that her undiagnosed MS had caused brain damage. As the condition worsened, she was heavily medicated, developed a dependency on alcohol and attempted suicide. She was inspired to reveal the news as a way to thank Allisa Swanson, her costume designer, who had become her unofficial "dresser" for her role in the Netflix series Another Life, saying that Swanson "gets my legs in my pants, pulls my tops over my head, (and) buttons my coats."

In 2019, Blair received a service dog to help her deal with multiple sclerosis. She wrote about her experiences with multiple sclerosis in her memoir, Mean Baby: A Memoir of Growing Up, which was published in May 2022.

In an October 2026 episode of The Jenny McCarthy Wahlberg Show, Blair said she would drink alcohol to cope with the symptoms of multiple sclerosis when she was younger.

== Filmography ==
=== Film ===
†	Denotes productions that have not yet been released

Year	Title	Role	Notes
1996	The Broccoli Theory	Pretzel cart lesbian	
1996	Brain Candy	Girl at rock concert	
1997	Strong Island Boys	Tara	
1997	Gone Again	Ayla	Short film
1997	Arresting Gena	Drugged woman	
1997	In & Out	Cousin Linda	
1998	Brown's Requiem	Jane	
1998	Girl	Darcy	
1998	Can't Hardly Wait	Girl Mike hits on No. 1	
1999	Cruel Intentions	Cecile Caldwell	
2000	Down to You	Cyrus	
2001	Storytelling	Vi	Segment "Fiction"
2001	Legally Blonde	Vivian Thelma Kensington	
2001	Kill Me Later	Shawn Holloway	
2002	Highway	Cassie	
2002	The Sweetest Thing	Jane Burns	
2003	A Guy Thing	Karen Cooper	
2003	Dallas 362	Peg	
2004	Hellboy	Liz Sherman	
2004	A Dirty Shame	Caprice Stickles / Ursula Udders	
2004	In Good Company	Kimberly	
2005	Pretty Persuasion	Grace Anderson	
2005	The Deal	Abbey Gallagher	
2005	The Fog	Stevie Wayne	
2005	The Big Empty	Alice	Short film
2006	The Alibi	Adelle	
2006	The Night of the White Pants	Beth Hagan	
2006	Hellboy: Sword of Storms	Liz Sherman (voice)	Direct-to-video
2007	Hellboy: Blood and Iron	Liz Sherman (voice)	Direct-to-video
2007	Purple Violets	Patti Petalson	
2007	WΔZ	Jean Lerner	
2007	Feast of Love	Kathryn Smith	
2008	My Mom's New Boyfriend	Emily Lott	
2008	The Poker House	Sarah	
2008	Hellboy II: The Golden Army	Liz Sherman	
2011	The Family Tree	Ms. Delbo	
2011	Animal Love	Sorrel	Short film
2011	The Break-In	Beverly	Short film
2011	Dark Horse	Miranda	
2011	Kingdom Come	Herself	Documentary
2012	Columbus Circle	Abigail Clayton	
2012	In Their Skin	Mary Hughes	
2015	Sex, Death and Bowling	Glenn McAllister	
2016	Eva Hesse	Eva Hesse (voice)	Documentary
2016	Ordinary World	Karen Miller	
2016	Mothers and Daughters	Rigby	
2017	Mom and Dad	Kendall Ryan	
2019	After	Carol Young	
2020	After We Collided	Carol Young	
2020	A Dark Foe	Doris Baxter	
2021	Introducing, Selma Blair	Herself	Documentary
2021	Far More	Glenn McAllister	
2025	Stay Forte		
TBA	Silent †	Skylar	Pre-production
TBA	There There †		Pre-production

=== Television ===
Year	Title	Role	Notes
1995	The Adventures of Pete & Pete	Penelope Ghiruto	Episode: "Das Bus"
1996	The Dana Carvey Show	Uncredited	Episode: "The Szechuan Dynasty"
1997	Amazon High	Cyane	Pilot
1997	Soldier of Fortune, Inc.	Tish August	Episode: "La Mano Negra"
1998	Getting Personal	Receptionist	Pilot
1998	Promised Land	Carla Braver	Episode: "Designated Driver"
1998	No Laughing Matter	Lauren Winslow	Television film
1999–2000	Zoe, Duncan, Jack and Jane	Zoe Bean	
2000	Xena: Warrior Princess	Cyane	Episode: "Lifeblood"
2002	Friends	Wendy	Episode: "The One with Christmas in Tulsa"
2003	Coast to Coast	Stacey Pierce	Television film
2004	DeMarco Affairs	Kate DeMarco	Pilot
2008–2009	Kath & Kim	Kim	
2010	Tommy's Little Girl	Lawyer / Assassin	Pilot
2010	Web Therapy	Tammy Hines	3 episodes
2011	Portlandia	Frannie Walker	Episode: "Blunderbuss"
2012–2013	Anger Management	Kate Wales	
2012	Web Therapy	Tammy Hines	2 episodes
2012	Slideshow of Wieners: A Love Story	Becca	Short
2013	Out There	Destiny / Larry (voices)	2 episodes
2013	Comedy Bang! Bang!	Herself / Cyber girl	Episode: "Andy Samberg Wears a Plaid Shirt & Glasses"
2014	Really	Joanna	Pilot
2016	The People v. O. J. Simpson: American Crime Story	Kris Jenner	3 episodes
2016	Bookaboo	Herself	Post-production
2018–2019	Lost in Space	Jessica Harris	3 episodes
2018	Heathers	Jade Duke	4 episodes
2019	Another Life	Harper Glass	Main role (season 1)
2020	DuckTales	Witch Hazel (voice)	Episode: "The Trickening!"
2022	Dancing with the Stars	Herself	Contestant (season 31)

=== Theatre ===
Year	Title	Role	Notes
1990	The Little Theatre of The Green Goose	Various roles	
2009	Gruesome Playground Injuries	Kayleen	Alley Theatre

=== Music videos ===
Year	Title	Role	Artist(s)	Notes
1998	Charmed		My Friend Steve	
1999	Every You Every Me	Cecile Caldwell	Placebo	Film version
2010	Full of Regret	Katt	Danko Jones	

=== Video games ===
Year	Title	Voice role
2008	Hellboy: The Science of Evil	Liz Sherman

=== Audiobooks ===
Year	Title
2010	The Diary of Anne Frank

== Awards and nominations ==
Year	Award	Result	Category	Title	Notes	Ref
1999	Teen Choice Awards	Nominated	Choice TV: Breakout Star	Zoe, Duncan, Jack and Jane		
2000	MTV Movie Awards	Nominated	Breakthrough Female Performance	Cruel Intentions		
2000	MTV Movie Awards	Won	Best Kiss	Cruel Intentions (Shared with Sarah Michelle Gellar)		
2000	Young Hollywood Awards	Won	Exciting New Face – Female			
2002	Teen Choice Awards	Nominated	Choice Movie: Actress Comedy	The Sweetest Thing		
2002	Young Hollywood Awards	Won	Next Generation			
2003	DVD Exclusive Awards	Nominated	Best Actress	Highway		
2005	Fangoria Chainsaw Awards	Nominated	Best Supporting Actress	Hellboy		
2008	Scream Awards	Nominated	Best Actress – Fantasy Movie	Hellboy II: The Golden Army		
2011	Grammy Award	Nominated	Best Spoken Word Album for Children	Anne Frank: The Diary of a Young Girl: The Definitive Edition		
2015	Operation Smile	Won	Universal Smile Award			
2021	Media Access Awards	Won	Visionary Award	Life's Work	Presented by Keah Brown	
2022	People's Choice Award	Won	The Competition Contestant of 2022	Dancing with the Stars		
2022	100 Women (BBC)	Nominated	Actress			
2025	CineHealth	Won	Lifetime Achievement			
