= Chanshi =

Israeli television drama series

- חאנשי
- Genre: Comedy
- Created by: Aleeza Chanowitz
- Directed by: Aaron Geva; Mickey Triest
- Starring: Aleeza Chanowitz
- Music by: Shuzin
- Country of origin: Israel
- Original languages: Hebrew; English
- No. of seasons: 1
- No. of episodes: 10

Production
- Producers: Hagit Asulin; Ayelet Imberman
- Cinematography: Ziv Berkovich
- Editors: Or Ben David; Danel Elpeleg; Adi Vishnia
- Running time: 30 minutes
- Production company: Kastina Communications

Original release
- Network: HOT
- Release: December 8, 2022

Chanshi (Hebrew: חאנשי) is an Israeli comedy series created and starring Aleeza Chanowitz. Caroline Aaron and Henry Winkler have supporting roles. It centers on Chanshi (Chanowitz), a young American Jewish woman that decided to leave her community behind and make aliyah to Israel. It began airing on the HOT network in 2022 and received 15 Ophir Award nominations.

== Plot summary ==
Chanshi (Chanowitz), a young ultra-orthodox Jewish woman from Brooklyn has recently gotten engaged to Mendy (Gvirtsman). However, she surprises everyone, including her family by deciding to make aliyah to Israel before the wedding. Once in Israel and without her family's presence and expectations, she embarks on a series of adventures and seeks to fulfill her fantasies by sleeping with Israeli soldiers. Her father (Winkler) orders her to return home and continue with her wedding plans.

== Cast ==
=== Main ===
- Aleeza Chanowitz as Chanshi, a Jewish American woman that makes aliyah to Israel
- Marnina Schon as Noki, Chanshi's best friend
- Tomer Machloof as David, Chanshi's handsome Mizrahi roommate that she develops romantic feelings towards
- Lee Bader as Eliana
- Danielle Jadelyn as Nomi
- Michal Birnbaum as Chanaleh
- Dor Gvirtsman as Mendy

=== Supporting ===
- Caroline Aaron as Babshi, Chanshi's stepmother
- Henry Winkler as Tatty, Chanshi's father and Babshi's husband

=== Guest ===
- Roi Miller as Michael, a settler
- Bar Brimer as Tom
- Oshri Cohen as Oz

== Release ==
The first season premiered on the HOT network in Israel on 8 December 2022. In North America, it premiered at the 2023 Sundance Film Festival on 21 January.

== Reception ==
Hannah Brown of The Jerusalem Post praised the series: I admire Chanowitz for dramatizing a dynamic that is very well known to Americans in Israel but hasn't been discussed on screen much before...Chanshi plays like a comic version of Unorthodox, the miniseries about an ultra-Orthodox young woman leaving the fold, crossed with Amarcord, Federico Fellini’s semi-autobiographical, often outrageous movie about a horny adolescent, and that’s a potent combination."

The series received a total of 15 Ophir Award nominations:

- Best Comedy Drama Series (Aleeza Chanowitz)
- Best Actress in a Comedy Series (Aleeza Chanowitz)
- Best Directing in a Comedy Series (Aaron Geva and Mickey Triest)
- Best Script in a Comedy Series (Aleeza Chanowitz)
- Best Supporting Actor in a Comedy Series (Tomer Machloof)
- Best Supporting Actress in a Comedy Series (Lee Bader)
- Best Cinematography (Ziv Berkovich)
- Best Editing (Or Ben David, Danel Elpeleg and Adi Vishnia)
- Best Art Direction (Omri Yekutieli)
- Best Costume Design (Tal Kilshon)
- Best Sound Design (Ran Tsrouya and Aviv Aldema)
- Best Original Music (Shuzin)
- Best Casting (Hila Yuval)
- Best Makeup (Shelley Saar)

== See also ==
- Israeli television
- Culture of Israel
