= Tomer Machloof =

Israeli film and television actor (born 1991)

- תומר מחלוף
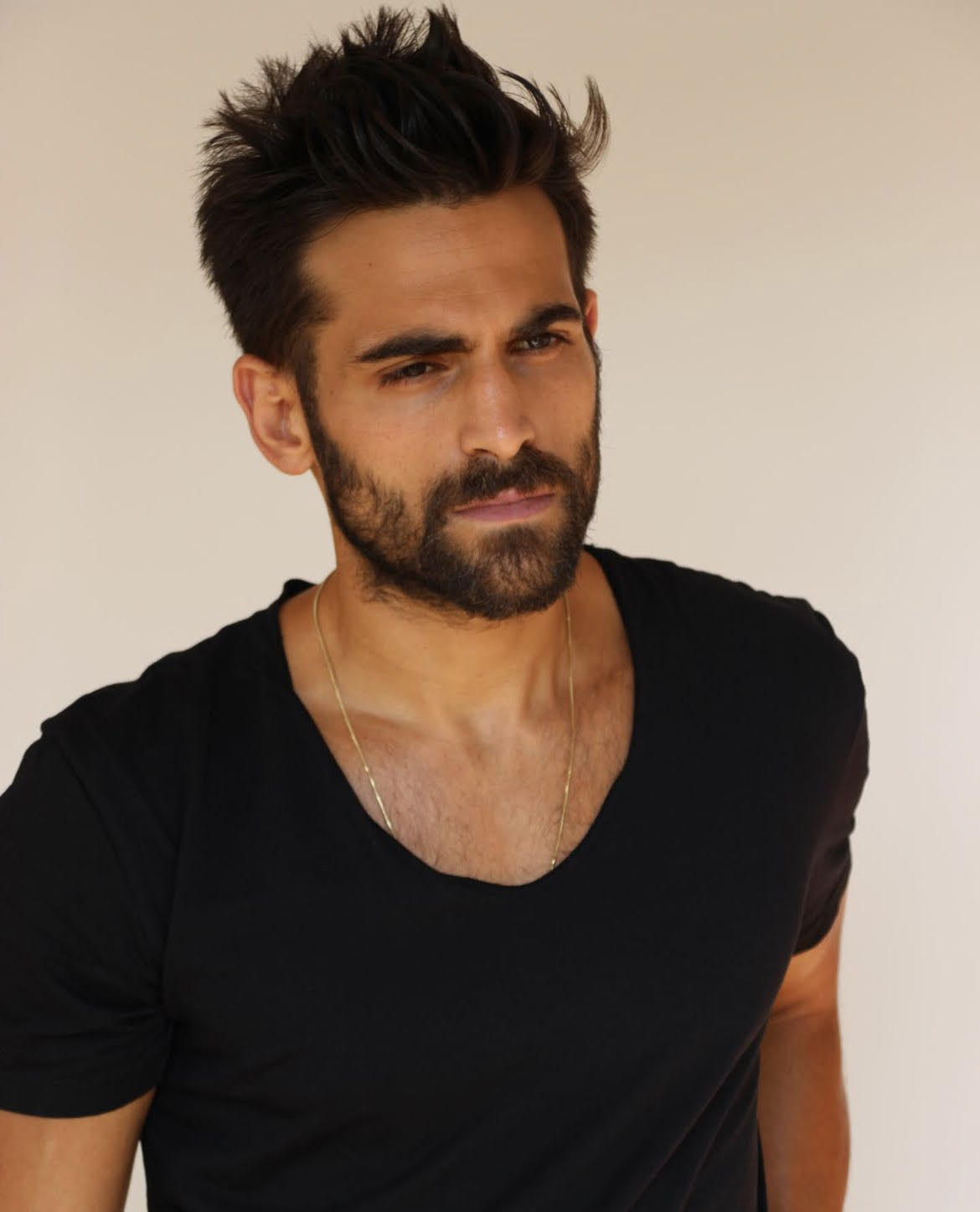
- Born: 25 July 1991 (age 35); Bat Yam, Israel
- Occupations: Actor; model
- Spouse: Yael Elkana (m. 2021)

Tomer Machloof (Hebrew: תומר מחלוף; born 25 July 1991) is an Israeli film actor, television and stage actor and model. He is best known for his role as David in the HOT comedy series, Chanshi (2022), for which he received an Ophir Award nomination for Best Supporting Actor in a Comedy Series.

== Early life ==
Machloof was born in 1991 in Bat Yam in Israel. He is the youngest of three children. His father is a butcher and his mother sells women's lingerie. He attended Shazar High School, majoring in theater. At the age of 15, he became increasingly religious and began studying at Kaf HacHaim, an ultra-orthodox yeshiva in Jerusalem. He later distanced himself from ultra-orthodox Judaism.

At the age of 24 he moved to Tel Aviv and graduated from the Yoram Loewenstein Performing Arts Studio in 2018.

== Career ==
=== Stage ===
As part of his studies at Yoram Loewenstein's studio, he appeared in the plays "The Lost Women of Troy", "House of Ghosts" and "Hannah in the Haven". He also had a lead role in Arthur Miller's "A View from the Bridge" in 2018 alongside Niv Sultan.

After graduating, he appeared in the play "Teacher of Life" at the Orna Porat Children's Theater and "Seven" at Beit Lessin Theater in 2018.

In 2021, he appeared in the play "The Kaban" at the Habima Theater, in the role of Benny Efriat, a Golani Brigade fighter.

He is returning to the Habima Theater in December 2025, to star alongside Joy Rieger in Noam Shmuel's production of The Caucasian Chalk Circle by Bertold Brecht.

In September 2026, Machloof reunited with his Chanshi co-star, Aleeza Chanowitz at the Beit Lessin Theater for the play, "Sticky".

In November 2026, Machloof will begin starring in the play "The Unit" by The Hebrew Theatre and perform in venues across Israel.

=== Television ===
In 2017, he had a supporting role in the second season of Kipat Barzel, about haredi recruits in the Israel Defense Forces.

In 2020, he played the recurring role of Nevo opposite Niv Sultan in the Kan 11 spy series, Tehran.

In 2022, he became a series regular in the HOT comedy series, Chanshi. He plays David, the Mizrahi roommate and love interest of the titular character. He received an Ophir Award nomination for Best Supporting Actor in a Comedy Series for his portrayal of David.

In 2026, he will star in a new series for HOT, The Rais.

=== Film ===
In late 2024, he began filming Stay Forte, a new film by Doron Eran. He plays Oren Shamri (based on Alon Shamriz). Shamriz was taken hostage by Hamas during the October 7 attack on Israel. He was mistakenly identified as a threat by Israeli soldiers during fighting in northern Gaza and killed.

== Personal life ==
He is married to Yael Elkana, an actress and model and dual citizen of Israel and the United States. The two met in 2015 at Yoram Loewenstein's acting studio and got married in 2021. They live in the Tokhnit Lamed neighborhood in Tel Aviv.

== Filmography ==
| Year | Title | Role | Notes |
|---|---|---|---|
| 2017 | Kipat Barzel | | Supporting role |
| 2018 | Fauda | | 1 episode |
| 2019 | Battle Hymn (War Song) | Soldier | Short film |
| 2020 | Checkout (Kupa Rashit) | Football player | 1 episode |
| 2020 | Tehran | Nevo | Recurring role; 4 episodes |
| 2021 | Ruth | | Film |
| 2022 | Chanshi | David | Series regular Ophir Award nomination for Best Supporting Actor in a Comedy Series |
| 2025 | Stay Forte | Alon Shamriz | Film |

== Stage ==
| Year | Title | Role | Venue | Ref. |
|---|---|---|---|---|
| 2018 | A View from the Bridge | Eddie Carbone | Yoram Loewenstein Performing Arts Studio | |
| 2018 | Seven | | Beit Lessin Theater | |
| 2021 | The Kaban | Benny Efriat | Habima Theatre | |
| 2025 | The Caucasian Chalk Circle | Simon | Habima Theatre | |
| 2026 | Sticky | | Beit Lessin Theatre | |
| 2026 | The Unit | | The Hebrew Theatre | |
