= Albert G. Richards =

Albert G. Richards (1917-2008) was a photographer and dental scientist.

== Career ==
Born in Chicago. Richards obtained a degree in Chemical Engineering and Physics at the University of Michigan. Richards became a dental instructor in 1940. Richards became a professor in 1959 and taught at Michigan for more than four decades.

== Accomplishments ==
Richards has created numerous inventions, including dynamic tomography to examine layers of an object, a dental x-ray head, the molding technique to show the topography of dental surfaces, and the Buccal Object Rule to examine the location of objects. Richards held six patents for his inventions and was the author of around 100 journal articles.

== Awards ==
An award was created in recognition of Richards work and is given to one student annually.

== Publications ==
In 1962 Richards photographs were published in the National Geographic Society's School Bulletin. The Smithsonian Magazine then promoted Richards photographs in 1986. In 1990 Richards was published in the Editor's Choice - Smithsonian and he self-published a book called The Secret Garden - 100 Floral Radiographs.

A collection of his work is now held by The Museum of Jurassic Technology in LA, where it is currently on display.

== Personal life ==
Richards was married and had 5 children.
