= Zoe, Duncan, Jack and Jane =

American sitcom

- Also known as: Zoe...
- Genre: Sitcom
- Created by: Daniel Paige; Sue Paige
- Directed by: Robert Berlinger; Gil Junger; Jeff McCracken; Brian K. Roberts; Jonathan Weiss; Dana DeVally Piazza; Craig Zisk
- Starring: Selma Blair; Michael Rosenbaum; Azura Skye; David Moscow; Mary Page Keller; Omar Gooding
- Theme music composer: Steven R. Burry (season 1)
- Opening theme: "Charmed" by My Friend Steve (season 1)
- Composer: Roger Boyce
- Country of origin: United States
- Original language: English
- No. of seasons: 2
- No. of episodes: 26

Production
- Executive producers: Michael Jacobs; Peter Aronson
- Producers: Jim Freedman; Mike Rowe; Morgan Sackett; Jean Zuhorski
- Camera setup: Multi-camera
- Running time: 30 minutes
- Production companies: Michael Jacobs Productions (1999) (season 1); Touchstone Television; Warner Bros. Television (2000) (season 2)

Original release
- Network: The WB
- Release: January 17, 1999 – June 11, 2000

Zoe, Duncan, Jack and Jane is an American teen sitcom created by Daniel and Sue Paige, starring Selma Blair, David Moscow, Michael Rosenbaum, and Azura Skye that premiered on The WB on January 17, 1999, and ended on June 11, 2000. During development, the show was initially known as Zoe Bean and was later retitled Zoe... during its second season. The series was produced by Michael Jacobs Productions and Touchstone Television and aired a total of 26 episodes over its two seasons.

== Characters ==
The series centered on four eccentric high school friends in New York City. The foursome attended (fictional) Fielding-Mellish Prep, which gets its name from Woody Allen's character in the movie Bananas.

- Zoe Bean (Selma Blair): A coy, boy-crazy daydreamer.
- Duncan Milch (David Moscow): An anxious oddball. A Woody Allen type.
- Jack Cooper (Michael Rosenbaum): Jane's older fraternal twin brother. Handsome, but egotistical and selfish.
- Jane Cooper (Azura Skye): Jack's younger fraternal twin sister. Sarcastic and cynical.

The show also starred Mary Page Keller as Zoe's single mother Iris during the first season. Scott Foley, fresh from Dawson's Creek, appeared in the pilot with the intention of having him star in the series as Zoe's love interest. But once the pilot finally got picked up, Foley had already moved on to Felicity.

== Episode Cast ==
- Selma Blair as Zoe Bean, the leader of the Foursome
- Michael Rosenbaum as Jack Cooper, Jane's older fraternal twin brother and the member of the Foursome
- Azura Skye as Jane Cooper, Jack's younger fraternal twin sister and the member of the Foursome
- David Moscow as Duncan Milch, the member of the Foursome
- Mary Page Keller as Iris Bean, Zoe's single mother (Season 1)
- Omar Gooding as Doug Anderson, the friend of Foursome (Season 2)

== Episodes ==
=== Series overview ===
Season	Episodes	Originally released	
Season	Episodes	First released	Last released
1	13	January 17, 1999	May 16, 1999
2	13	January 31, 2000	June 11, 2000

=== Season 1 (1999) ===
During the first season, the show centered on the four teenagers as high school students. Jeremy Renner originally played Jack in the original pilot episode, but was replaced by Michael Rosenbaum. The first season included guest stars such as Scott Foley as a college boy Zoe had a crush on, Sara Rue as a wheelchair-using bully, Will Friedle as a charming stoner who dated Zoe, and Jacinda Barrett as a girl, who liked both Duncan and Jack.

The first season theme song was "Charmed" by My Friend Steve.

List of Zoe, Duncan, Jack and Jane season 1 episodes
No. overall	No. in season	Title	Original release date	Prod. code	US viewers (millions)
1	1	"Pilot"	January 17, 1999	516-T	3.80
2	2	"Everything You Wanted to Know About Zoe"	January 24, 1999	J-406	3.61
3	3	"When Zoe Met Johnny"	February 7, 1999	J-404	2.97
4	4	"To Jack, from Zoe"	February 14, 1999	J-409	4.32
5	5	"Sympathy for Jack"	February 21, 1999	J-411	4.0
6	6	"Hard Cheese on Zoe"	February 28, 1999	J-403	2.99
7	7	"The Trouble with Jane"	March 7, 1999	J-410	3.75
8	8	"A Good Man is Hard to Find"	March 10, 1999	J-412	3.59
9	9	"The Advice"	March 14, 1999	J-413	3.73
10	10	"Under Mom's Thumb"	April 11, 1999	J-408	3.68
11	11	"Down and Out at Bleecker and Houston"	May 2, 1999	J-402	2.66
12	12	"Zoe Under the Influence"	May 9, 1999	J-407	2.80
13	13	"Run, Man Ray, Run"	May 16, 1999	J-405	2.32

=== Season 2 (2000) ===
When the show returned for a second season, it had been heavily retooled. The friendship between the four friends remained intact, but now they were adult college students. Gone was Keller as Zoe's mom, while Omar Gooding joined the cast as the foursome's friend, Doug Anderson, from Maine. The title had also been shortened to simply Zoe... (pronounced in on-air promotions for the show as Zoe Dot Dot Dot, phoneticizing the ellipsis) out of concern that the original title was turning off potential viewers.

After the series was cancelled, Michael Rosenbaum expressed disappointment with the fact that the network had cut his character's name out of the title for the second season.

List of Zoe... season 2 episodes
No. overall	No. in season	Title	Directed by	Original release date	Prod. code	US viewers (millions)
14	1	"No Good Deed"	Gil Junger	January 31, 2000	226052	2.82
15	2	"The Customer Is Always Vic"	James Hampton	February 7, 2000	226054	2.41
16	3	"I Don't Feel So Good"	James Hampton	February 14, 2000	226056	2.36
17	4	"Kiss of Death"	Brian K. Roberts	April 2, 2000	226057	1.59
18	5	"The Feud"	Dana DeVally Plazza	April 9, 2000	226062	1.73
19	6	"A Midsummer Night's Nightmare"	Gil Junger	April 16, 2000	226063	1.46
20	7	"Crossing the Line"	Brian K. Roberts	April 23, 2000	226060	1.53
21	8	"Desperately Seeking Zoe"	Robert Berlinger	April 30, 2000	226058	1.73
22	9	"Tall, Dark and Duncan's Boss"	James Hampton	May 14, 2000	226055	1.35
23	10	"My Dinner with Andy"	Robert Berlinger	May 21, 2000	226059	1.51
24	11	"Too Much Pressure"	Brian K. Roberts	May 28, 2000	226061	1.53
25	12	"Party Girls"	Gil Junger	June 4, 2000	226053	1.24
26	13	"Three Years Later"	Gil Junger	June 11, 2000	226051	1.43
