= Aleeza Chanowitz =

- 'עליזה חנוביץ
- Born: 16 June 1990 (age 36); Brooklyn, New York City, U.S.
- Education: Bar-Ilan University; Brooklyn College; Sam Spiegel Film and Television School
- Occupations: Film director, screenwriter, actress
- Notable work: Chanshi

Aleeza Chanowitz (Hebrew: עליזה חנוביץ'; born 16 June 1990) is an Israeli-American director, screenwriter and actress. She is best known for creating and starring in the hit comedy series, Chanshi (2022–present) on HOT 3.

== Early life ==
She was born and raised in the New York borough of Brooklyn to a Modern Orthodox mother and Chabad Hasidic father. Her parents divorced when she was four years old and she attended a Modern Orthodox high school. After graduating from high school, she studied for a year at Bar-Ilan University, and then returned to New York to study Judaic Studies at Brooklyn College.

== Career ==
She made aliyah to Israel in 2011, after completing her studies. She studied film at the Sam Spiegel Film and Television School in Jerusalem from 2012 to 2017.

Mushkie, a short student film Chanowitz wrote and directed in 2015, was included in the Jerusalem Film Festival and the Berlin International Film Festival. In 2017, she created, directed and starred in the short film Shabbos Kallah. The film was included in the lineup of the Jerusalem Film Festival and several international Jewish film festivals. It won the Best Short Film award at the Jerusalem Film Festival.

In 2022, she created and starred in the HOT 3 comedy series, Chanshi. She stars as the titular character, a young ultra orthodox woman that leaves New York and embarks on a series of reckless adventures in Israel when she emigrates there. The series is partly autobiographical, inspired by Chanowitz' own experiences of aliyah. In November 2023, Chanowitz was preparing to travel to the Stockholm Film Festival for a screening of "Chanshi" when unidentified festival representatives emailed that her invitation had been rescinded. After the explanations for the event (which careened from economic and security "concerns" to statements about her presence being potentially dangerous and a Swedish ban on travel to and from Israel) were publicly shared, the festival half-apologized for a "communications error" and invited her to attend the event with the conditions that she pay for her own flight and publicly state that the screening had never been cancelled (which wasn't an issue), leading Chanowitz to reject the festival and nix any further relationship with it.

In September 2026, Chanowitz reunites with her Chanshi co-star, Tomer Machloof at the Beit Lessin Theater for the play, "Sticky".
