= Museum of Jurassic Technology =

American museum

Coordinates: 34°01′33″N 118°23′42″W

The Museum of Jurassic Technology at 9341 Venice Boulevard in the Palms district of Los Angeles, California, United States, was founded by David Hildebrand Wilson and Diana Drake Wilson in 1988. While it calls itself "an educational institution dedicated to the advancement of knowledge and the public appreciation of the Lower Jurassic", the relevance of the term "Lower Jurassic" to the museum's collections is left unexplained, and "Jurassic Technology" is likewise undefined (the dawn of technology generally being understood as occurring millions of years after the Jurassic).

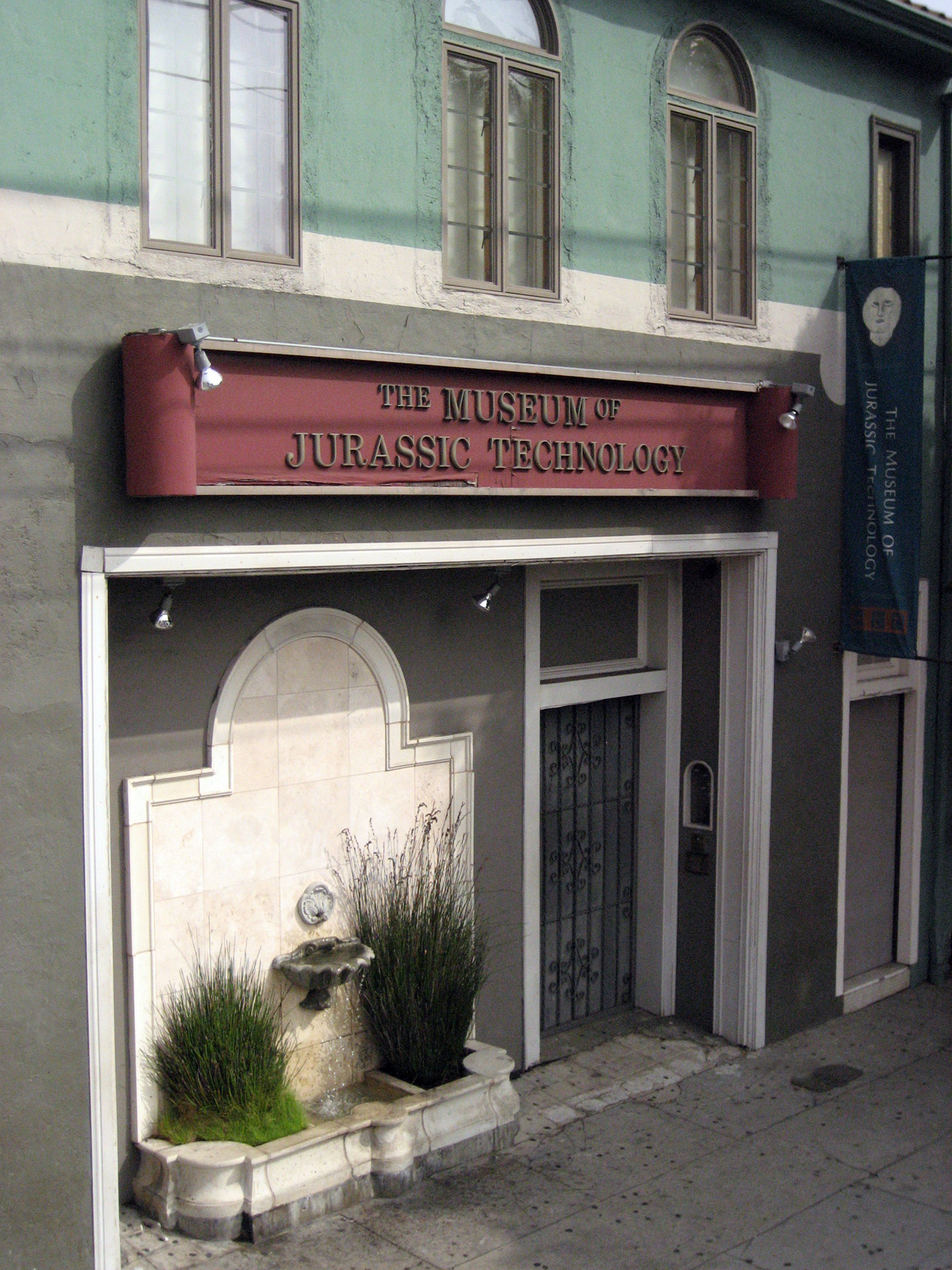
Museum of Jurassic Technology, 9341 Venice Boulevard, Los Angeles

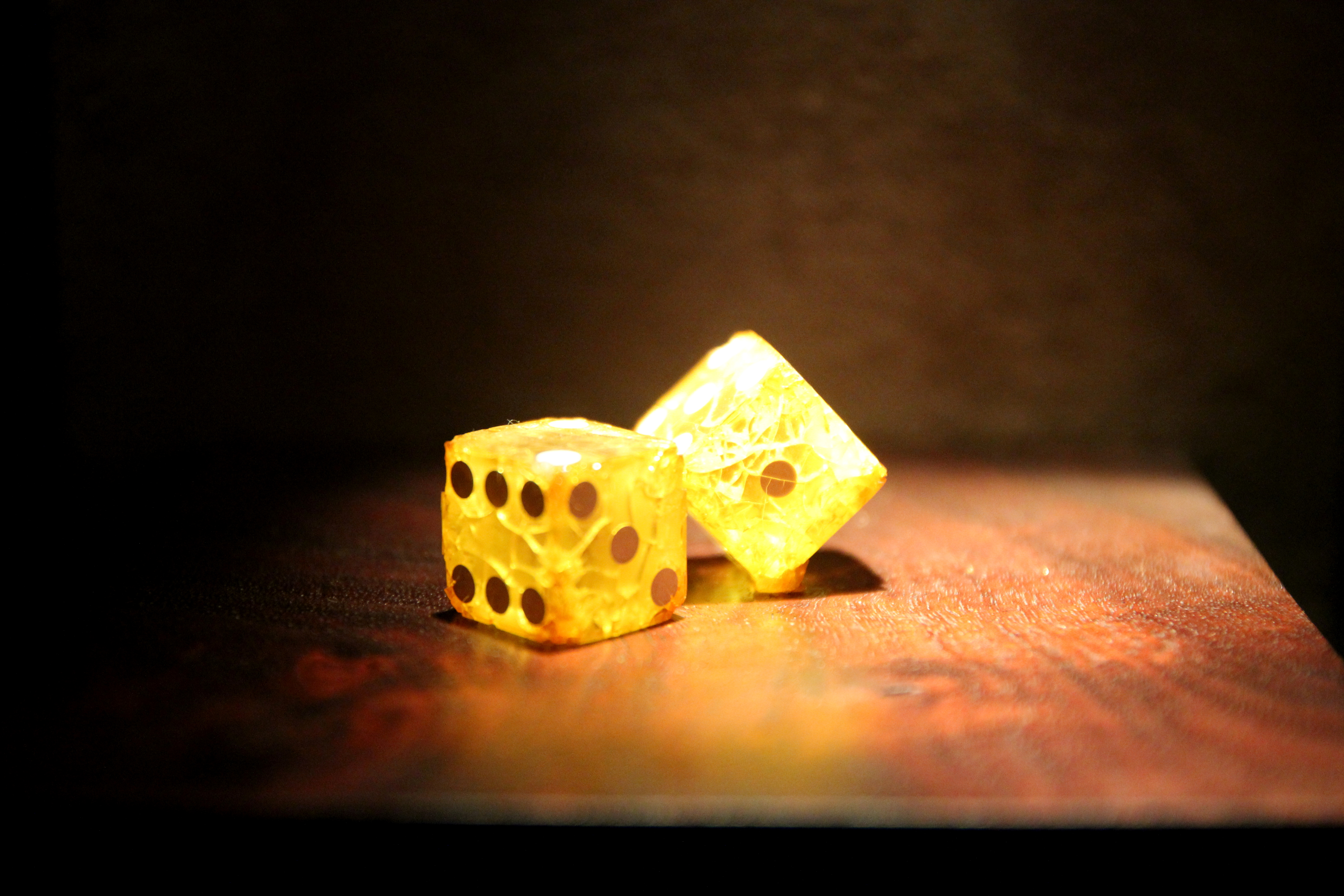
Rotten Luck: Decaying Dice of Ricky Jay

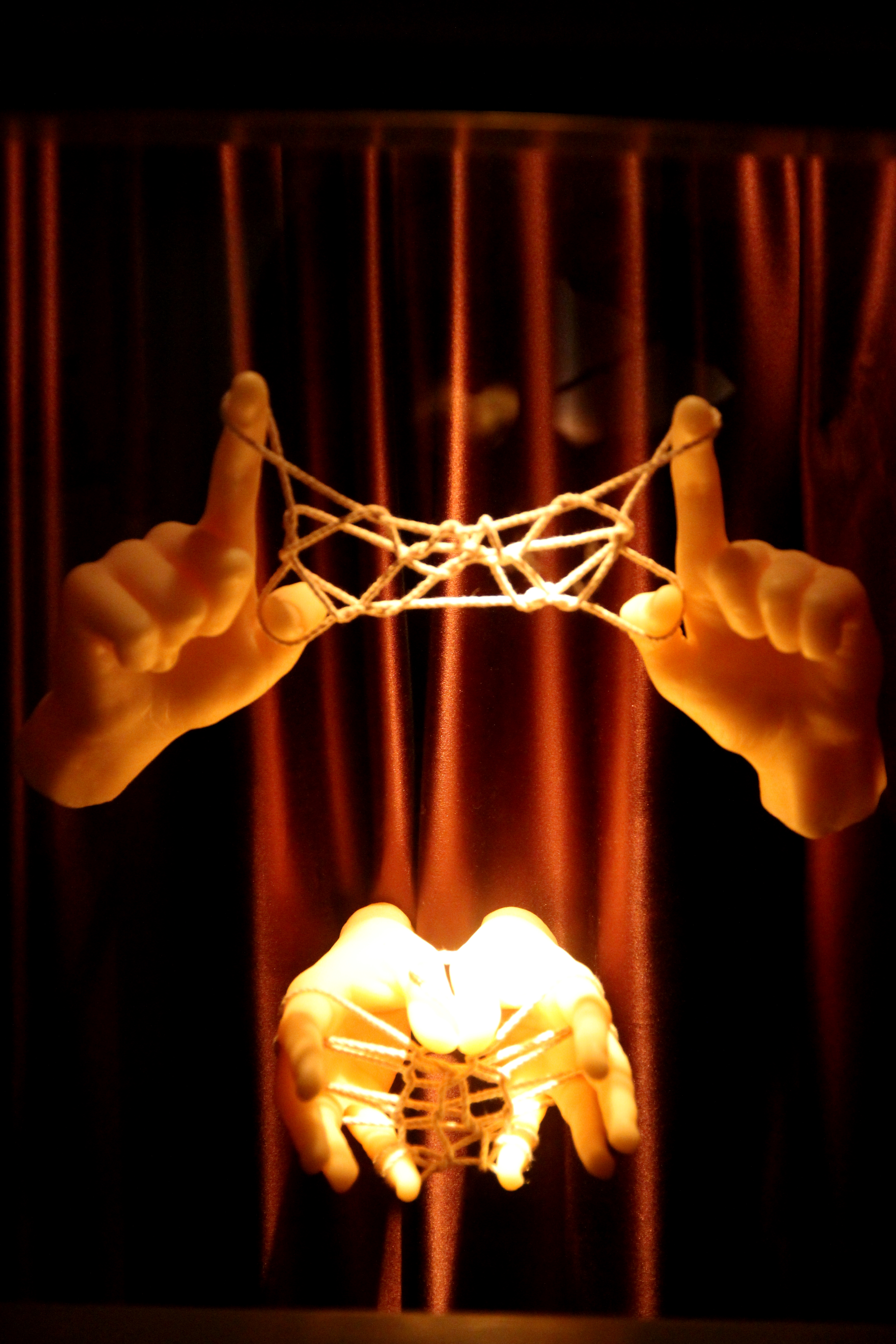
Fairly Safely Venture: String Figures and their Venerable Collectors

The museum's collection includes a mixture of artistic, scientific, ethnographic, and historic items, as well as some unclassifiable exhibits; the diversity evokes the cabinets of curiosities that were the 16th-century predecessors of modern natural-history museums. The factual claims of many of the museum's exhibits strain credibility, provoking an array of interpretations.

David Hildebrand Wilson received a MacArthur Foundation fellowship in 2001.

On July 8, 2025, a fire broke out in the museum, causing significant smoke damage to several exhibits. The museum reopened in early August 2025.

== Overview ==
The museum contains an unusual collection of exhibits and objects with varying and uncertain degrees of authenticity. New York Times critic Edward Rothstein described it as a "museum about museums", "where the persistent question is: what kind of place is this?" Smithsonian magazine called it "a witty, self-conscious homage to private museums of yore . . . when natural history was only barely charted by science, and museums were closer to Renaissance cabinets of curiosity." In a similar vein, The Economist said the museum "captures a time chronicled in Richard Holmes's recent book The Age of Wonder, when science mingled with poetry in its pursuit of answers to life's mysterious questions."

Lawrence Weschler's 1995 book, Mr. Wilson's Cabinet of Wonder: Pronged Ants, Horned Humans, Mice on Toast, And Other Marvels of Jurassic Technology, attempts to explain the mystery of the Museum of Jurassic Technology. Weschler deeply explores the museum through conversations with its founder, David Wilson, and through outside research on several exhibitions. His investigations into the history of certain exhibits led to varying results of authenticity; some exhibits seem to have been created by Wilson's imagination while other exhibits might be suitable for display in a natural history museum. The Museum of Jurassic Technology at its heart, according to Wilson, is "a museum interested in presenting phenomena that other natural history museums are unwilling to present."

The museum's introductory slideshow recounts that "In its original sense, the term, 'museum' meant 'a spot dedicated to the Muses, a place where man's mind could attain a mood of aloofness above everyday affairs'". In this spirit, the dimly lit atmosphere, wood and glass vitrines, and labyrinthine floorplan lead visitors through an eclectic range of exhibits on art, natural history, history of science, philosophy, and anthropology, with a special focus on the history of museums and the variety of paths to knowledge. The museum attracts approximately 25,000 visitors per year.

== Exhibits ==
The museum maintains more than thirty permanent exhibits, including:

- The Delani/Sonnabend Halls: Recalling the intertwining story of an ill-fated opera singer, Madalena Delani, with a theoretician of memory, Geoffrey Sonnabend, whose three-part work Obliscence: Theories of Forgetting and the Problem of Matter suggests that memory is an elaborate construction that humankind has created "to buffer ourselves against the intolerable knowledge of the irreversible passage of time and the irretrievability of its moments and events."
- Tell the Bees: Belief, Knowledge, and Hypersymbolic Cognition: An exhibit of pre-scientific cures and remedies
- The Garden of Eden on Wheels: Collections from Los Angeles Area Trailer Parks
- The Unique World of Microminiatures of Hagop Sandaldjian: A collection of micro-miniature sculptures, each carved from a single human hair and placed within the eye of a needle. Currently on display: Goofy, Pope John Paul II, and Napoleon I. Other microminiatures include violins; dancers; a crucifix (made of a single strand of the artist's hair and gold); characters like Donald Duck, Pinocchio, Snow White and the Seven Dwarfs; a self-portrait; a golf player; and a baseball player swinging his bat.
- Micromosaics of Harold "Henry" Dalton: Microscopic mosaics from the 19th century depicting flowers, animals, and other objects, made entirely from individual butterfly wing scales and diatoms
- The Stereofloral Radiographs of Albert G. Richards: A collection of stereographic radiographs of flowers
- Rotten Luck: The Decaying Dice of Ricky Jay: A collection of decomposing antique dice once owned by magician Ricky Jay and documented in his book Dice: Deception, Fate, and Rotten Luck
- No One May Ever Have the Same Knowledge Again: Letters to Mt. Wilson Observatory : A small room dedicated to unusual letters and theories received by the Mount Wilson Observatory circa 1915–1935
- The World is Bound with Secret Knots: The Life and Works of Athanasius Kircher: A survey of the fields of study, writings and inventions of the 17th-century Jesuit polymath who was the founder of the Kircherian Museum in Rome
- The Lives of Perfect Creatures: The Dogs of the Soviet Space Program: An oil portrait gallery of the heroic cosmonaut canines
- Fairly Safely Venture: String Figures from Many Lands and their Venerable Collectors

From 1992 to 2006, the museum's Foundation Collection was on display in its Tochtermuseum at the Karl Ernst Osthaus-Museum in Hagen, Germany. This exhibition was part of the Museum of Museums wing at the KEOM, which came into being under the stewardship of director Michael Fehr.

As part of the 2024-2025 PST ART initiative, the museum opened A Veiled Gazelle - Intimations of the Infinite and Eternal - Islamic Geometries of Medieval al-Andalus, which focuses on Islamic art, geometry, and architecture in Spain. The exhibit received funding from The Getty and the Mike Kelley Foundation.

== Auxiliary functions ==
In 2005, the museum opened its Tula Tea Room, a Russian-style tea room where Georgian tea and accompanying cookies are served, the cost covered by the price of admission. This room is a miniature reconstruction of the study of Tsar Nicolas II from the Winter Palace in St. Petersburg, Russia. The tea room is shared with a number of live doves and other birds.

The Borzoi Kabinet Theater screens a series of poetic documentaries produced by the Museum of Jurassic Technology in collaboration with the St. Petersburg–based arts and science collective Kabinet. The series of films, entitled A Chain of Flowers, draws its name from the quotation by Charles Willson Peale: "The Learner must be led always from familiar objects toward the unfamiliar, guided along, as it were, a chain of flowers into the mysteries of life". The titles of the films are Levsha: The Cross-eyed Lefty from Tula and the Steel Flea (2001), Obshee Delo: The Common Task (2005), Bol'shoe Sovietskaia Zatmenie: The Great Soviet Eclipse (2008), The Book of Wisdom and Lies (2011), and Language of the Birds (2012).

== In popular culture ==
Besides being the subject of Lawrence Weschler's 1995 book Mr. Wilson's Cabinet of Wonder: Pronged Ants, Horned Humans, Mice on Toast, and Other Marvels of Jurassic Technology, the museum is mentioned in the 2008 novel The Museum of Innocence, by Turkish Nobel-laureate Orhan Pamuk. It is also mentioned in Richard Roberts's young adult science fiction books Please Don't Tell My Parents I'm a Supervillain (2014) and Please Don't Tell My Parents I Saved the World Again (2024), in which it is given the alternate origin of having been funded by a wealthy Creationist for the display of proof that humans and dinosaurs lived alongside each other. The character Zoe mentions the museum in the book Tomorrow, and Tomorrow, and Tomorrow (2022) by Gabrielle Zevin.
