= Polyglot (disambiguation) =

A polyglot is someone who speaks multiple languages.

Polyglot may also refer to:

- Polyglot (book), a book that contains the same text in more than one language
- Polyglot (computing), a computer program that is valid in more than one programming language
- Polyglot (webzine), a biweekly game industry webzine published by Polymancer Studios
- Polyglot markup, HTML markup that conforms to both the HTML and XHTML specifications
- Polyglot Petition, a global call for a common cause, such as prohibitionism
- The Polyglots, a 1925 novel by Anglo-Russian William Gerhardie

== See also ==
- List of polyglots
- Mixed language
- Multilingualism, the use of multiple languages, either by an individual or by a community
- Pidgin, a language that develops between groups who do not share a common language
