= William Malatinsky =

American author

William Malatinsky is an American author and frequent contributor to the Virginia Quarterly Review. His fiction was short-listed for The Best American Short Stories in 2006 and 2010.

He graduated from Kalamazoo College in 2002.
