= Shahar Tavoch =

Israeli actor and singer (born 1999)

- שחר טבוך
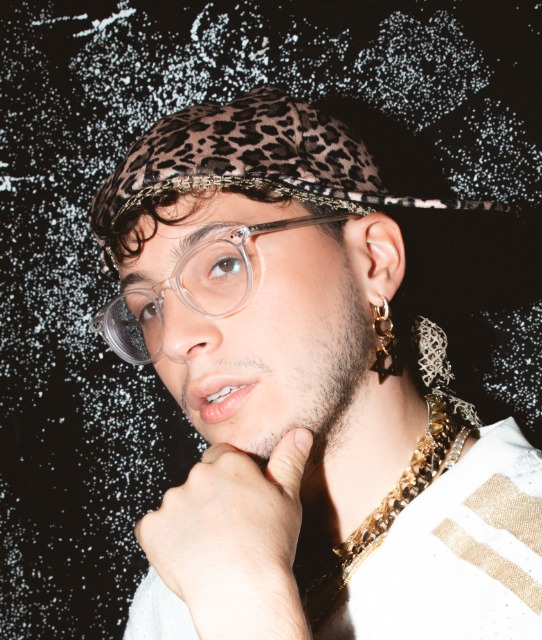
- Tavoch in 2025
- Born: 18 March 1999 (age 27); Ramat Gan, Israel
- Occupations: Actor; singer; television presenter
- Years active: 2013–present

Shahar Tavoch (Hebrew: שחר טבוך; born 18 March 1999) is an Israeli actor, singer, and television presenter.

== Early life ==
Tavoch was born and raised in Ramat Gan, Israel, and studied in Blich high school. His mother, Ettie, is head of accounting at the Open University of Israel, and his father, Shaul, is a sales agent.

== Professional career ==
In 2012–2013, he hosted the TV show Click on Arutz HaYeladim, in which the participants present videos they have uploaded on YouTube, and the prank show Staaam!, in which the hosts (Oded Paz, Tal Mosseri, Dana Frider, etc.) prank various teen stars.

In 2013, he played the role of Shloimele Efros, son of Yosele and Shaindl in the play Mirele Efros in the Habima Theatre.

In 2014, he participated in the game show Raid the Cage, along with Maya Shoham.

In 2017, he participated in the reality TV show Rising Star. In 2018, he played the character of Erez in the film Herzl's Susita.

In the same year, he played the role of Matan in the show Our Treasure on the Kan Educational channel.

In 2019, he played the character of Niv in the youth series Runaway on HOT.

In March 2020, he played the role of Lev in the series Mishpaha BeHanpaka. He appeared in the music video for the song קוצ'י מוצ'י by Taylor Malkov and Ben Zini. In the same year, he dubbed various characters for Lodge 49.

In October 2020, Kan 11 aired the drama series Valley of Tears, in which Tavoch played the role of Avinoam.

In March 2021, he played the role of Brosh in the TV series Sky. That same year, he dubbed George's character in A Week Away, and a character in Yes Day

On July 19, 2021, he released his first single, פחדן (IPA: [paχˈdan]; lit. 'Coward'). In August of the same year, Who's the Boss? aired, in which he plays the role of Gomme.

Tavoch appeared in the Festigal alongside his co-actress from Sky and Mishpaha BeHanpaka, Bar Minieli.

On January 9, 2022, he released his second single, מישבאלי (IPA: [miʃebali]; lit. 'WhoeverIDesire').

That same year, he dubbed Thomas in Thomas & Friends: All Engines Go.

On July 4 of the same year, he released his third single, "Mangal".

In late 2024, he began filming Stay Forte, playing Nadav Hai (based on Yotam Haim), a real-life hostage of the Gaza war hostage crisis.

In November 2025, the song "Naughty Body" (with Agam Buhbut) was awarded the Moshe Wilensky Song of the Year Achievement Award at the 2025 ACUM Awards ceremony in Herzliya.

In December 2025, Tavoch participated in the 2025 edition of the children's musical show Festigal alongside Eden Golan.

== Personal life ==
In November 2020, Tavoch stated in an interview with Yediot Ahronot that following the connection that he formed with his co-actor Aviv Alush during the filming of Valley of Tears, he has started keeping Sabbath and putting on tefillin. Tavoch has stated that he is gay.

Tavoch married his husband Amir Aharon in August 2026.

== Discography ==
=== Charted singles ===
List of charted singles as lead artist, showing album name and year released
Title	Year	Peak chart position	Album
Title	Year	ISR	Album
"Nadi be'adi" (with Agam Buhbut)	2024	2	Hai, ze shchar
