= Cassandra Fraser =

American synthetic chemist

- Awards: Presidential Early Career Award for Scientists and Engineers

Academic background
- Education: BA, 1984, Kalamazoo College; MTS, 1988, Harvard Divinity School; PhD, 1993, University of Chicago
- Thesis: The development of open-closed bimetallic complexes : for redox cooperative oxygen binding, activation, and oxygen transfer catalysis (1993)
- Doctoral advisor: Robert H. Grubbs
- Website: faculty.virginia.edu/fraserlab/index.html

Cassandra L. Fraser is an American synthetic chemist with an interest in biomedicine and sustainable design. She is a Full Professor of Chemistry at the University of Virginia.

== Early life and education ==
Fraser completed her Bachelor of Arts degree at Kalamazoo College in 1984 and her master's degree at Harvard Divinity School. Following her PhD at the University of Chicago in 1993, she accepted a postdoctoral fellowship at the California Institute of Technology. Fraser conducted her postdoctoral studies under the guidance of Robert H. Grubbs.

== Career ==
Fraser joined the department of chemistry at the University of Virginia in 1995. In this role, she received a 1998 Presidential Early Career Award for Scientists and Engineers for "outstanding research in metal-core macromolecules and redesign of undergraduate and graduate courses." As a full professor of chemistry, Fraser led a graduate student laboratory where she co-developed one class of biomaterials with the potential to impact imaging techniques. She also crossed a light-emitting dye with a corn-based polymer which revealed that the biomaterial not only had bright fluorescence when exposed to ultraviolet light but also had vivid phosphorescence. She tested whether the oxygen nanosensor that couples a light-emitting dye with a biopolymer could improve tumor imaging.

In 2010, Fraser and her graduate student Guoqing Zhang focused on synthesizing and fabricating light-emitting biomaterials and chemicals. They co-founded Luminesco, a company, with the idea that these compounds could be used as high-tech "mechanosensors" and possibly in forensic and security applications. Following this, she was chosen to be an inaugural member of the University Academy of Teaching. As a result of her research, Fraser was elected a Fellow of the American Association for the Advancement of Science. In 2017, Fraser was one of three professors awarded the Jefferson Scholars Foundation's Excellence in Teaching Award.
