= Mr. Wilson's Cabinet of Wonder =

1995 book by Lawrence Weschler

Mr. Wilson's Cabinet Of Wonder: Pronged Ants, Horned Humans, Mice on Toast, and Other Marvels of Jurassic Technology
- First edition
- Author: Lawrence Weschler
- Publisher: Pantheon Books
- Publication date: 1995
- Media type: Print (paperback)
- Pages: 192 pp
- ISBN: 978-0-679-76489-2

Mr. Wilson's Cabinet of Wonder: Pronged Ants, Horned Humans, Mice on Toast, and Other Marvels of Jurassic Technology is a 1995 book by Lawrence Weschler primarily about the Museum of Jurassic Technology in Los Angeles, California, and, more broadly, the history and role of museums.

== Contents ==
The book is divided into two sections, called Inhaling the Spore and Cerebral Growth. Inhaling the Spore focuses on the Museum of Jurassic Technology itself. The author relates his experiences with the museum and its creator, the titular David Hildebrand Wilson.

In Cerebral Growth Weschler goes into greater depth about Wonder Cabinets. "Cerebral growth" is also a pun, as one of the objects of the museum is a human horn.

== Reception ==
Mr. Wilson's Cabinet of Wonder was a finalist for the National Book Critics Circle Award for nonfiction and the Pulitzer Prize for General Nonfiction. In 2019, Dan Kois and Laura Miller of Slate ranked it one of the 50 best nonfiction works of the past quarter-century.

== Editions ==
- ISBN 978-0-679-76489-2 (Paperback). Published by Random House.
