= Martin A. Larson =

American historian and writer

- Born: March 2, 1897; Whitehall, Michigan
- Died: January 15, 1994 (aged 96); Phoenix, Arizona
- Occupations: Historian, writer

Martin Alfred Larson (March 2, 1897, in Whitehall, Michigan – January 15, 1994, in Phoenix, Arizona) was an American historical revisionist and freethinker. He specialized in the history of Christianity and wrote on its origins and early theological history, best known for his assertion that Jesus Christ and John the Baptist were Essenes. Larson was a long-term member of the Institute for Historical Review.

== Biography ==
Larson was originally from a fundamentalist Christian Evangelical background but "rejected its dogmas and practices" when he was about twenty years old. Following service in the United States Navy, he graduated from Kalamazoo College in Michigan, after which he earned a Ph.D. in English literature from the University of Michigan in 1927 with a thesis on the unorthodoxies of Milton, whom he found to have rejected the doctrine of the Trinity. He retired from a career in business at the age of 50 to devote himself to private study, lecturing and writing.

A long-time friend of historian Harry Elmer Barnes, Larson was a member of the Editorial Advisory Committee of the Institute for Historical Review's Journal of Historical Review from its first issue in 1980 to his death.

Larson was also a tax critic and tax expert who was popular with the Tax protester movement for his books on the tax immunity of organized religion, the Federal Reserve, and how to fight the IRS. His articles have appeared in Parade Magazine, Fortune Magazine, Reader's Digest and other publications, and he had a regular column in The Spotlight entitled "Our World In Conflict".

He spent the final years of his life with his wife Emma in Phoenix, Arizona.

== Theories ==
Larson's lifelong body of work constructs a complete historical theory of the origins of Christianity and the genesis of its theological controversies, detailing its evolution from the pagan cults of Osiris and Dionysus to modern times. This includes a synthesis of ideas, deities, and personalities that show how they combined to favor the rise and dominance of Christianity over religious competitors such as Mithraism, which lacked a human founder and excluded the general public, and Manichaeism, which invited the general public but lacked a deified founder. The thrust of his work is to show that Christianity evolved from pagan religions and Judaism rather than arose full-blown from the mind of a single religious prophet. Although he had no advanced degree in the subject, his works were popular with freethinkers, and he defended his theories to his death.

Larson stated that he spent more than four years studying ancient Egyptian, Persian, Brahman, Jain, Buddhistic, Judaistic and Essene cultures which all influenced the Essene Order from which the Christian Gospels originated. According to Larson, the Essenes absorbed the eschatology and metaphysics of the Zoroastrians and later the Pythagoreans and ancient mystery cults of Greece and the Asia Minor. Larson studied the Dead Sea Scrolls literature and commented that the Essenes "engrafted a Christology which combined a Persian with a Messianic Judaic concept, which, in a period of crisis, they personalized in a martyred Teacher of Righteousness whom they expected to return upon clouds about 35-50 B.C. accompanied by a myriad of angels to conduct the Last Judgement." Larson concluded that Jesus was an Essene who convinced himself he was the incarnate of Christ destined to redeem mankind so left the Order to create a mass movement.

== Reception ==
Leander E. Keck a professor of Biblical Theology noted that Larson reconstructed "post-Maccabean Judaism, pre-Constantinian church history, the literary and historical developments of Essenism and Qumran and the historical Jesus, in order to build a pan-Essene view of Christian origins."

Millar Burrows positively reviewed Larson's The Essene Heritage commenting that "of all the efforts thus far to demonstrate an Essene origin of Christianity surely this is the most ingenious, elaborate and determined... Dr. Larson does not lack imagination. If his conclusions prove less convincing to others than they are to him, his book at least deserves fair consideration as a serious, conscientious piece of work, evincing both originality and industry." However, Siegfried Horn negatively reviewed the book as trying "to prove that Christianity is nothing but a warmed-up Essene religion" and criticized Larson for "reconstruct[ing] an artificial history of Essenism according to his own interpretation of the scanty historical evidence extant in the Qumran scrolls and in other ancient records."

Larson's The Essene Heritage was also negatively reviewed in the Indian Journal of Theology as an "offering from the lunatic fringe. He argues, with a conspicuous lack of scholarship and a depressing mishmash of phoney exegesis, that Jesus was a frustrated Essene who (probably) survived his attempted crucifixion, and whose simple Essene-type gospel was rapidly distorted by the machinations of the crypto-Catholics."

== Published books ==
- The Modernity of Milton: A Theological and Philosophical Interpretation (1927)
- The Religion of the Occident: Or, The Origin and Development of the Essene-Christian Faith (1959). His synthesis of facts regarding the Christian epic, from its pagan origins, Palestinian primary and secondary sources, and age-old religious concepts introduced by the Egyptians, Babylonians, Assyrians, Persions, Buddhists, Greeks, Jews, Phrygians, and Syrians, examining the soteriology, eschatology, and ethics, and the Messianic concept which make up Christianity.
- Liberty Lobby Presents The Great Tax Fraud: You Can Say Goodbye Forever to Your Income Tax (1965)
- The Essene Heritage; Or, The Teacher of the Scrolls and the Gospel Christ (Philosophical Library, 1967, Library of Congress catalog card no. 67–19183). Claims that Jesus Christ and John the Baptist were Essenes. www.jstor.org review
- The Great Tax Fraud: How the Federal Government Favors the Rich and Exploits the Masses (1968, B0007E793A)
- Praise the Lord for Tax Exemption: How the Churches Grow Rich, While the Cities and You Grow Poor (with C. Stanley Lowell) (1969)
- When Parochial Schools Close: A Study in Educational Financing (September 1972)
- Tax Revolt: U.S.A. (1973 1st ed., Library of Congress catalog card no. 72–97025).
- The Federal Reserve (Devin-Adair Publishing, 1975) ISBN 0-8159-5514-6
- The Religious Empire: The Growth and Danger of Tax-Exempt Property in the United States (1976) ISBN 0-88331-082-1
- The Story of Christian Origins (1977) ISBN 0-88331-090-2. Revised and expanded ed. of "The Religion of the Occident" 1959.
- The Continuing Tax Rebellion (1979) ISBN 0-8159-5220-1
- The Essene-Christian Faith: A Study in the Sources of Western Religion (1980, 1989) ISBN 0-939482-16-9. Larson's views on the development of the Essene movement.
- The I.R.S. vs. The Middle Class (1980) ISBN 0-8159-5824-2
- Martin Larson's Best (1984) ISBN 0-935036-06-7
- New Thought: A Modern Religious Approach (1985) ISBN 0-8022-2464-4. A historical overview of the New Thought movement, giving it origins in the European Enlightenment of the 18th century.
- How to Defend Yourself Against the Internal Revenue Service: A Handbook for Use in Protecting Personal Assets (1985)
- Jefferson: Magnificent Populist. A collection of quotes from Thomas Jefferson, organized into Larson's categories.
