= Lawrence Weschler =

American writer

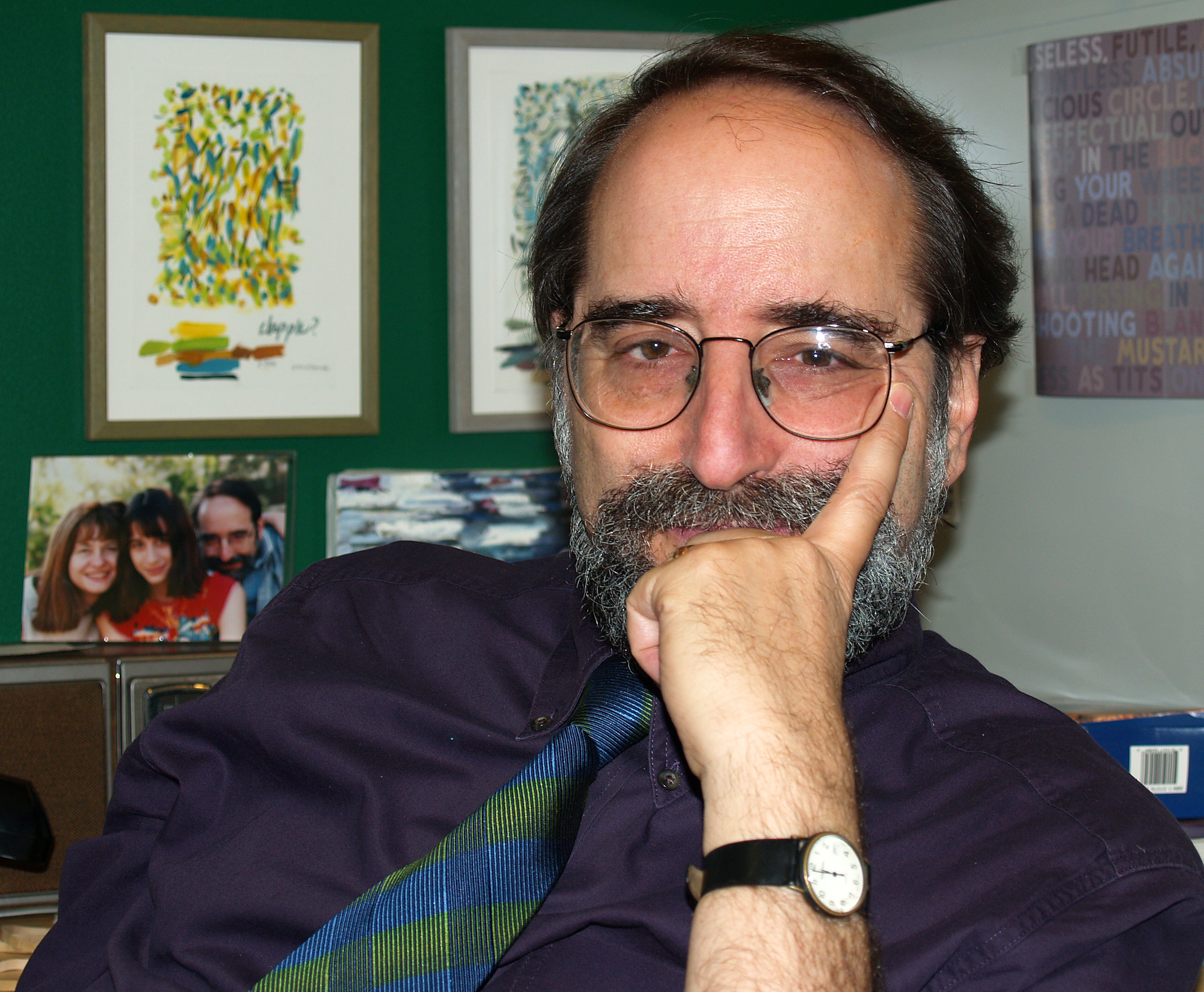
- Born: 1952 (age 73–74); Van Nuys, California
- Occupation: Writer
- Writing career
- Period: 1981–present
- Genre: Creative nonfiction

Lawrence Weschler (born 1952 in Van Nuys, California) is an American author of works of creative nonfiction.

A graduate of Cowell College of the University of California, Santa Cruz (1974), Weschler was for over twenty years (1981–2002) a staff writer at The New Yorker, where his work shuttled between political tragedies and cultural comedies. He is a two-time winner of the George Polk Awards—for Cultural Reporting in 1988 and Magazine Reporting in 1992—and was also a recipient of the Lannan Literary Award (1998).

His books of political reportage include The Passion of Poland (1984); A Miracle, A Universe: Settling Accounts with Torturers (1990); and Calamities of Exile: Three Nonfiction Novellas (1998).

His “Passions and Wonders” series currently comprises Seeing is Forgetting the Name of the Thing One Sees: A Life of Contemporary Artist Robert Irwin (1982); David Hockney’s Cameraworks (1984); Mr. Wilson’s Cabinet of Wonder (1995); A Wanderer in the Perfect City: Selected Passion Pieces (1998); Boggs: A Comedy of Values (1999); Robert Irwin: Getty Garden (2002); Vermeer in Bosnia (2004); Everything that Rises: A Book of Convergences (February 2006); and Uncanny Valley: Adventures in the Narrative (2011). Mr. Wilson's Cabinet of Wonder was shortlisted for both the Pulitzer Prize and the National Book Critics Circle Award; and Everything that Rises received the 2007 National Book Critics Circle Award for Criticism.

Recent books include a considerably expanded edition of Seeing is Forgetting the Name of the Thing One Sees, comprising thirty years of conversations with Robert Irwin; a companion volume, True to Life: Twenty Five Years of Conversation with David Hockney; Liza Lou (a monograph out of Rizzoli); Tara Donovan, the catalog for the artist’s recent exhibition at Boston’s Institute for Contemporary Art, and Deborah Butterfield, the catalog for a survey of the artist’s work at the LA Louver Gallery.

Weschler has taught, variously, at Princeton, Columbia, UCSC, Bard, Vassar, Sarah Lawrence, and NYU, where he is now distinguished writer in residence at the Arthur L. Carter Journalism Institute.

He recently graduated to director emeritus of the New York Institute for the Humanities at NYU, where he has been a fellow since 1991 and was director from 2001–2013, and from which base he had tried to start his own semiannual journal of writing and visual culture, Omnivore. He is also the artistic director emeritus, still actively engaged, with the Chicago Humanities Festival, and curator for New York Live Ideas, an annual body-based humanities collaboration with Bill T. Jones and his NY Live Arts. He is a contributing editor to McSweeney’s, The Threepenny Review, and The Virginia Quarterly Review; curator at large of the DVD quarterly Wholphin; (recently retired) chair of the Sundance (formerly Soros) Documentary Film Fund; and director of the Ernst Toch Society, dedicated to the promulgation of the music of his grandfather, the noted Weimar émigré composer.

From 2013 to 2014, Weschler contributed “Pillow of Air,” a monthly column in The Believer dedicated to “Amble through the worlds of the visual.” In October 2021, in collaboration with editor and cartoonist David Stanford, Weschler launched the newsletter Wondercabinet, described as a "Fortnightly Compendium of the Miscellaneous Diverse", taking up many of the same themes as his earlier column.

== Bibliography ==
=== Books ===
- Solidarity : Poland in the season of its Passion. 1982.
- Seeing Is Forgetting the Name of the Thing One Sees: A Life of Contemporary Artist Robert Irwin (1982)
- The Passion of Poland: From Solidarity through the State of War (1984)
- A Miracle, a Universe: Settling Accounts with Torturers (1990)
- Shapinsky’s Karma, Boggs’s Bills, and Other True-life Tales (1990)
- Mr. Wilson's Cabinet of Wonder (1995)
- A Wanderer in the Perfect City: Selected Passion Pieces (1998)
- Calamities of Exile: Three Nonfiction Novellas (1998)
- Boggs: A Comedy of Values (1999)
- Vermeer in Bosnia (2004)
- Everything That Rises: A Book of Convergences (2006)
- True To Life: Twenty-Five Years of Conversations with David Hockney (2008)
- Seeing Is Forgetting the Name of the Thing One Sees: Over Thirty Years of Conversations with Robert Irwin (Expanded Edition) (2008)
- Uncanny Valley: Adventures in the Narrative (2011)
- Domestic Scenes: The Art of Ramiro Gomez (2016)
- Waves Passing in the Night (2017)
- And How Are You, Dr. Sacks?: A Biographical Memoir of Oliver Sacks (2019)

=== Essays and reporting ===
- "The Talk of the Town: Notes and Comment" The New Yorker 60/49 (January 21, 1985): 21–22. Talk piece on disarmament.
- "The Talk of the Town: Notes and Comment" The New Yorker 60/52 (February 11, 1985): 27–28. Talk piece on Polish political situation.
- "Notes and comment". The Talk of the Town. The New Yorker. 62 (34): 35–37. October 13, 1986.
- "The Paralyzed Cyclops: Mediating a Vivid, Decades-Long Argument between Two Giants of Contemporary Art" The Believer 6/9 [58] (November/December 2008): 23–25. Robert Irwin & David Hockney.
- A Rare Personal Look at Oliver Sacks's Early Career (2015)
