= David Hildebrand Wilson =

Museum of Jurassic Technology founder

- Occupation: Businessman
- Known for: Museum of Jurassic Technology

David Hildebrand Wilson is the co-founder, along with his wife, Diana Wilson, of the enigmatic Museum of Jurassic Technology in Los Angeles, California.

After high school, Wilson enrolled at Kalamazoo College where he majored in urban entomology with a minor in art. He received an MFA in Experimental Animation from the California Institute of the Arts in 1976.

He was awarded the MacArthur Fellowship and the Creative Capital Moving Image Award in 2001. Wilson and his museum are the subject of the book, Mr. Wilson's Cabinet of Wonder, published in 1995.
