= Seinfeld season 6 =

Seinfeld
- Season 6
- DVD cover
- Showrunner: Larry David
- Starring: Jerry Seinfeld; Julia Louis-Dreyfus; Michael Richards; Jason Alexander
- No. of episodes: 24

Release
- Original network: NBC
- Original release: September 22, 1994 – May 18, 1995

Season chronology
- ← Previous; Season 5 Next → Season 7

The sixth season of Seinfeld, an American comedy television series created by Jerry Seinfeld and Larry David, began airing on September 22, 1994, and concluded on May 18, 1995, on NBC. Season six placed first in the Nielsen ratings, above Home Improvement and ER.

== Production ==
Seinfeld was produced by Castle Rock Entertainment and aired on NBC in the United States. The executive producers were Larry David, George Shapiro, and Howard West with Tom Gammill and Max Pross as supervising producers. Bruce Kirschbaum was the executive consultant, after being a staff writer in the previous season. This season was directed by Andy Ackerman, replacing Tom Cherones, who had directed the majority of the episodes of the previous five seasons following the original pilot episode. Ackerman would direct every episode for the remainder of the series' run, with the exception of season six's "The Secretary" and season eight's "The Comeback", both directed by David Owen Trainor.

The series was set predominantly in an apartment block on New York City's Upper West Side; however, the sixth season was shot and mostly filmed in CBS Studio Center in Studio City, California. The show features Jerry Seinfeld as himself, and a host of Jerry's friends and acquaintances, which include George Costanza, Elaine Benes, and Cosmo Kramer, portrayed by Jason Alexander, Julia Louis-Dreyfus and Michael Richards, respectively.

== Episodes ==
No. overall	No. in season	Title	Directed by	Written by	Original release date	Prod. code	US viewers (millions)
87	1	"The Chaperone"	Andy Ackerman	Larry David and Bill Masters & Bob Shaw	September 22, 1994	601	32.8
Jerry goes on a date with Karen, Miss Rhode Island, but needs Kramer to substitute for her designated chaperone. Kramer impresses Karen as an armchair expert on Miss America pageants, and vows to win Karen the crown as her consultant. Elaine gets hired by socialite Justin Pitt as personal assistant when she dresses like his friend Jackie Kennedy Onassis, but she soon finds him impossible to satisfy. On George's advice, Yankees manager Buck Showalter switches the team from polyester to cotton uniforms. Staying in Atlantic City during the pageant, Jerry accidentally sabotages Karen's rehearsed performance.
88	2	"The Big Salad"	Andy Ackerman	Larry David	September 29, 1994	602	32.4
Elaine draws unwanted advances from a stationery store clerk who helps fill Mr. Pitt's order for a high-end mechanical pencil. George buys a big salad for Elaine, but is robbed of credit when his girlfriend gets thanked in his place. Jerry learns that his girlfriend once got dumped by Newman, and becomes haunted by why she was not good enough for someone so desperate. Former baseball star Steve Gendason is wanted by police for killing his dry cleaner, and Kramer assumes he drove Gendason to murder by penalizing Gendason in a golf game.
89	3	"The Pledge Drive"	Andy Ackerman	Tom Gammill & Max Pross	October 6, 1994	603	29.8
Elaine cannot tell apart her friend Noreen and Noreen's boyfriend Dan over the phone, creating misunderstandings that strain their relationship. Kramer makes Jerry cash every check his nana ever sent for his birthdays, overdrawing her bank account. George, pompously copying Mr. Pitt eating a Snickers bar with cutlery, impresses Yankees management and starts a trend. George helps Jerry get Yankee Danny Tartabull to appear on a PBS pledge drive, but, while driving Tartabull, gets sidetracked by seeing someone give him the finger. Jerry's nana goes off to the bank by herself, in confusion.
90	4	"The Chinese Woman"	Andy Ackerman	Peter Mehlman	October 13, 1994	604	29.2
George's phone line gets crossed with a woman named Donna Chang. Jerry gets a date with Donna because he likes Chinese women, but she turns out to be Caucasian while inviting misunderstandings over her last name. Through Donna, George learns his parents are getting divorced, and pins the blame on a mysterious caped man who was seen with his father. Kramer struggles to give up wearing briefs despite fearing that they have reduced his sperm count. Elaine turns Noreen off another boyfriend because he is a "long talker", and gets called out as a bad influence on Noreen.
91	5	"The Couch"	Andy Ackerman	Larry David	October 27, 1994	605	28.0
Kramer goes into the restaurant business with Poppie. Because Elaine is boycotting a business over abortion rights, Jerry makes her confront Poppie, as well as her new furniture mover boyfriend Carl, on the issue. Not knowing Poppie's medical conditions, Jerry gets Poppie hospitalized by rabble-rousing at his restaurant; offends Poppie with apology gifts that he cannot safely consume; and gets his new couch ruined by Poppie's incontinence. To get out of reading Breakfast at Tiffany's for his girlfriend's book club, George tracks down a stranger who rented the movie adaptation, and barges into his family movie night uninvited.
92	6	"The Gymnast"	Andy Ackerman	Alec Berg & Jeff Schaffer	November 3, 1994	606	30.6
Kramer makes Jerry "put in time" while dating a Romanian Olympic gymnast so that he can experience the supposed delights of sex with a gymnast, but Jerry blames Kramer when reality does not live up to the hype. Kramer leaves his autostereogram poster with Mr. Pitt, who becomes enthralled in search of the hidden 3D image. Elaine gets sent to a board meeting in Mr. Pitt's place, and jeopardizes a planned merger between spring water bottlers. George charms his girlfriend's mother, but gets caught eating out of her trash, then must explain away a pattern of unsavory behavior. Kramer is tormented by a kidney stone.
93	7	"The Soup"	Andy Ackerman	Fred Stoller	November 10, 1994	608	29.6
Comedian Kenny Bania shows off his unneeded Armani suit, and forces it on Jerry just so that Jerry will owe him a meal. George has good rapport with a waitress at Monk's, but asks her out and bungles the date. Unable to show his face at Monk's anymore, he tries to transplant his friends to nearby diner Reggie's instead. Elaine brings home a no-good boyfriend from England, who sponges off everyone and goes boozing and womanizing. Kramer gives up his refrigerator so that he can only eat food fresh, but cannot sate his girlfriend's ravenous hunger. Bania traps Jerry in his obligation by ordering only soup instead of a meal.
94	8	"The Mom & Pop Store"	Andy Ackerman	Tom Gammill & Max Pross	November 17, 1994	607	32.4
George boasts that he bought "Jon Voight"'s car, but goes into denial that he might have been suckered by a soundalike name. Kramer takes all of Jerry's sneakers to a mom and pop shoe repair shop on the verge of closure, but his meddling hastens their closure and leaves Jerry wearing a pair of cowboy boots. Mr. Pitt beseeches Elaine to win him a spot in the Macy's Thanksgiving Day Parade using her encyclopedic knowledge of big band records. Jerry helps dentist Tim Whatley send out party invitations, but does not get one himself. Jerry must risk being an uninvited guest to find a dentist before the holiday weekend.
95	9	"The Secretary"	David Owen Trainor	Carol Leifer & Marjorie Gross	December 8, 1994	609	29.7
The Yankees hire a secretary for George, and he chooses a bookish woman to avoid sexual temptations. Elaine must return a wide-girthed dress to Barneys, and suspects that they used skinny mirrors to fool her into buying it. Kramer writes Uma Thurman's phone number on Jerry's dry cleaning ticket, while Jerry catches his dry cleaner wearing his clothes. Kramer sells the clothes off his back to Kenny Bania with Jerry's ticket inside just as Jerry needs to settle his dry cleaning accounts. George falls for his secretary's clerical acumen, and, in the throes of passion, promises her a raise despite having no authority to do so.
96	10	"The Race"	Andy Ackerman	Story by : Tom Gammill & Max Pross and Larry David & Sam Kass; Teleplay by : Tom Gammill & Max Pross and Larry David	December 15, 1994	612	26.8
Jerry reveals that, in high school, he accidentally won a track race by jumping the gun unnoticed. Years later, his legend is questioned only by former classmate Duncan Meyer, who has reentered Jerry's life as his girlfriend Lois's boss. When Kramer is overworked as a department store Santa, Elaine's communist boyfriend Ned (Todd Kimsey) seizes the opportunity to convert him. George answers a personal ad in the Daily Worker, but word of his dealings with communists gets back to Steinbrenner. George vouches for Jerry by pretending to be out of touch since high school, but Duncan forces Jerry to race him in a rematch.
97	11	"The Switch"	Andy Ackerman	Bruce Kirschbaum and Sam Kass	January 5, 1995	610	36.6
Elaine lends out Mr. Pitt's tennis racket to curry favor with an interviewer for a job, but cannot get the racket back when tennis turns out to be life-or-death to her. George's girlfriend, a model who eats voraciously, runs off to the bathroom after every dinner, and he needs a bathroom matron to find out if she has an eating disorder. Kramer reluctantly reconciles with his mother because she has this job, and the reunion reveals Kramer's first name, Cosmo. Since Jerry's girlfriend does not laugh, he wants to switch to dating her roommate; George realizes he can only pull this off in one fell swoop by asking both roommates for a ménage à trois.
98	12	"The Label Maker"	Andy Ackerman	Alec Berg & Jeff Schaffer	January 19, 1995	611	36.2
Tim Whatley sends Jerry a label maker as thanks for his Super Bowl tickets. George admires his girlfriend Bonnie's well-appointed apartment, but cannot abide by her sharing it with a male roommate, Scott. Kramer puts a game of Risk on pause with Newman, but cannot trust Newman alone with the game board. Elaine, suspecting that Whatley re-gifted her label maker, goes to check his apartment, making him expect to score with her. Whatley gifts and "de-gifts" his spare ticket as various people gain and lose his favor. George gets more than he bargained for when Bonnie chooses him over Scott.
99	13	"The Scofflaw"	Andy Ackerman	Peter Mehlman	January 26, 1995	613	33.4
George is wounded that he was not trusted with news of Gary Fogel (Jon Lovitz)'s cancer, so Gary apologizes by confiding that he faked his cancer. Thanks to George's poor poker face, the truth gets back to Jerry, whose sympathy Gary exploited to pay for a new toupée. Jerry cannot confront Gary because he promised George a cheap parking space. Kramer tells Jake Jarmel that Elaine "said hi", causing her to lose their post-breakup standoff. As revenge, Elaine steals the jealously-guarded secret of Jake's glasses. Kramer learns about a cop's pursuit of an elusive parking violator, which is repeatedly foiled by unlikely fiascos.
100	14	"The Highlights of 100"	Andy Ackerman	Peter Mehlman	February 2, 1995	623	34.0
101	15	"The Highlights of 100"	Andy Ackerman	Peter Mehlman	February 2, 1995	624	34.0
Jerry introduces a clip show of highlights from the first 99 episodes of a "show about nothing."
102	16	"The Beard"	Andy Ackerman	Carol Leifer	February 9, 1995	615	32.9
Impressed by George's new toupée, Kramer sets him up with a gorgeous woman. She turns out to have gone bald since Kramer last saw her, but George's newfound self-importance makes him act too good for bald people. Elaine goes to the ballet for free as a gay banker's beard, but hopelessly falls for him for real, and desperately cajoles him to switch teams for her. Jerry goes out with a police officer, but cannot admit he watches Melrose Place as a guilty pleasure, and gets subjected to a polygraph test over his denial. Kramer feeds a homeless man, but cannot get his Tupperware back after.
103	17	"The Kiss Hello"	Andy Ackerman	Larry David & Jerry Seinfeld	February 16, 1995	614	33.4
George, needing advice from Elaine's physical therapist friend Wendy, is forced to pay for a consultation as a courtesy, but gets bilked when Wendy enforces a one-sided cancellation policy against him. Jerry wants to quit getting greeted with kisses hello, but Kramer adds to his social burden by posting every building tenant's names and photos to encourage greetings. Elaine, unable to criticize Wendy's old-fashioned hairdo to her face, sets up Kramer hoping he will do so in her stead. Jerry's nana remembers Uncle Leo's decades-old debt to Jerry's mother, motivating Leo to scheme to silence her.
104	18	"The Doorman"	Andy Ackerman	Tom Gammill & Max Pross	February 23, 1995	616	33.4
While Elaine housesits for Mr. Pitt, Jerry's plans with her are derailed when he makes an enemy of a passive-aggressive doorman on duty. Kramer uses George as his victim to show some tourists "a real New York mugging". George's parents' separation has left Frank living with George, who desperately entreats his mother to take his father off his hands. Kramer, discovering that Frank has male breasts, invents a male bra for him and inspires a joint business venture. Trying to make peace with the doorman, Jerry gets haplessly conscripted as a stand-in doorman, and ends up liable when a couch gets stolen.
105	19	"The Jimmy"	Andy Ackerman	Gregg Kavet & Andy Robin	March 16, 1995	617	31.1
George is impressed by Jimmy, a skilled basketball player who speaks in the third person, and partners with him to import plyometric training shoes. George's profuse sweating at the wrong time places him under suspicion for a rash of thefts at the Yankees clubhouse. Jimmy flirts with Elaine in the third person, causing her attraction towards another man to be misdirected at Jimmy. Tim Whatley's "adults only" dental clinic generously doses Jerry and Kramer with anesthetics; Jerry suspects Whatley molested him, while Kramer gets mistaken for a mentally challenged adult and honored at a charity benefit by Mel Tormé, the "Velvet Fog".
106	20	"The Doodle"	Andy Ackerman	Alec Berg & Jeff Schaffer	April 6, 1995	618	30.7
A misshapen doodle of George drawn by his girlfriend Paula (Christa Miller) reveals how she sees him, and he takes offense that she does not care how he looks. Elaine gets to stay in a luxurious hotel suite for a job interview, but when Jerry's apartment is infested with fleas, he twists her arm to yield the suite to his visiting parents. Elaine unknowingly leaves a manuscript for her interview in Jerry's apartment under fumigation. Kramer loiters in the apartment, inhaling poison and losing his sense of taste just as a delicious peach comes into season. Jerry must stay over with his girlfriend after failing to stomach some pecans that were in her mouth.
107	21	"The Fusilli Jerry"	Andy Ackerman	Story by : Marjorie Gross & Jonathan Gross and Ron Hauge & Charlie Rubin; Teleplay by : Marjorie Gross	April 27, 1995	619	28.2
Kramer gets issued the vanity plate "ASSMAN" in a mix-up, letting him pass off his car as a proctologist's, and hook up with a big-bottomed woman. Jerry's friend David Puddy performs Jerry's signature move during sex with Elaine. Jerry falls out with Puddy over this, depriving Elaine of sexual pleasure and himself of Puddy's services as "the only honest mechanic in New York". George needs Jerry's move to pleasure his girlfriend, but cannot memorize Jerry's meticulous instructions. Kramer makes a miniature "fusilli Jerry" sculpture. Estelle, preening over a new eye job, is flattered by Kramer "stopping short" with her as Frank did many years ago.
108	22	"The Diplomat's Club"	Andy Ackerman	Tom Gammill & Max Pross	May 4, 1995	620	28.9
Jerry must fly to Ithaca and back for a show, leaving just enough time to spend with his girlfriend before she leaves for a month. The day trip is overcomplicated by a booking agent who fusses over Jerry, assuming he is a high-maintenance celebrity. Mr. Pitt adds Elaine to his will in appreciation, but Jerry's uninformed advice at a pharmacy leads Mr. Pitt to take an unsafe drug combination, placing Elaine under suspicion for foul play. George, currying favor with a disapproving superior, looks for shortcuts to befriend black people to prove he is not racist. At an airport lounge, a Texan gambler makes Kramer relapse into a betting addiction.
109	23	"The Face Painter"	Andy Ackerman	Story by : Larry David and Fred Stoller; Teleplay by : Larry David	May 11, 1995	622	26.5
The group attends the NHL playoffs with Alec Berg's unused tickets, and Elaine finds out that David Puddy is a rowdy Devils fan who garishly paints his face. Puddy's celebratory bluster and devil visage petrify a foreign priest, who sequesters himself in terror of the "devil". Having thanked Alec up front, Jerry takes a stand against "overthanking" him after the game, then gets snubbed by Alec at a funeral and must decipher his attitude. George momentously confesses his love for the first time ever, but his girlfriend reacts like she did not hear him. At the zoo, a chimpanzee's mischief goads Kramer into retaliating against him.
110	24	"The Understudy"	Andy Ackerman	Marjorie Gross & Carol Leifer	May 18, 1995	621	29.8
The comedy club softball team plays for charity against the cast of Bette Midler's new musical. George, cheered on by Jerry, blindly rams Midler in a home run sprint. Midler is hospitalized, and her understudy, Jerry's girlfriend Gennice, gratefully assumes Jerry and George sabotaged her. The whole city turns against the trio, including Kramer, who is starstruck by Midler and waits on her hand and foot. Frank Costanza helps Elaine translate what her Korean manicurists are saying about her, and reveals an untold chapter of his life in Korea. Elaine runs into J. Peterman, and gets hired for her proficiency with the worldly prose of his catalog.

== Reception ==
The review aggregator website Rotten Tomatoes reported an 80% approval rating based on 5 critic reviews.
