= The Diplomat's Club =

- Seinfeld episode
- Episode no.: Season 6 Episode 22
- Directed by: Andy Ackerman
- Written by: Tom Gammill & Max Pross
- Production code: 620
- Original air date: May 4, 1995

Guest appearances
- Wayne Knight as Newman; Ian Abercrombie as Mr. Pitt; Robert Hooks as Joe; Debra Jo Rupp as Katie; Tom Wright as Morgan; O'Neal Compton as Earl; Kim Zimmer as Lenore; Ellis Williams as Karl; Berta Waagfjord as Bridgette

Episode chronology
← Previous "The Fusilli Jerry"	Next → "The Face Painter"
- Seinfeld season 6

"The Diplomat's Club" is the 108th episode of the NBC sitcom Seinfeld. This is the 22nd episode for the sixth season. It aired on May 4, 1995. In this episode, a chaperone overcomplicates Jerry's day trip to Ithaca; Elaine is suspected of plotting to kill Mr. Pitt for an inheritance; George looks for shortcuts to befriend a black person; and Kramer goes deep in the hole betting against a Texan at an airport lounge. This episode was Mr. Pitt's final regular appearance.

== Plot ==
Jerry has only hours before Bridgette, his supermodel girlfriend, leaves for a month, but before he can keep her company at the "Diplomat's Club" airport lounge, he must fly to Ithaca, New York and back for a show. Mr. Pitt shows his appreciation for Elaine's service by adding her to his will, just in time to dissuade her from quitting.

George, currying favor at work with the disapproving Mr. Morgan, compliments him for looking like Sugar Ray Leonard; Morgan takes offense that George thinks all black men look the same. Kramer starts betting whether anyone will back George up, but Jerry reminds him not to relapse into his gambling addiction. George wants to show off his black friends to Mr. Morgan, despite having none.

Elaine warns Mr. Pitt to ask about unsafe drug combinations before he buys cold medicine. At a pharmacy, Mr. Pitt finds Jerry, who is reshelving products that Kramer knocked down. Having never met Jerry before, Mr. Pitt confuses him, dressed professionally, for an employee. Jerry recommends some pills that cannot be mixed with Mr. Pitt's heart medication.

Jerry is chaperoned by Katie, a small-time booking agent. Assuming he is a high-maintenance celebrity, Katie fusses over Jerry with basic travel tips, to his impatience. Searching for black people to befriend, George tries to watch another movie uninvited with Joe, then starts approaching total strangers. An adverse drug reaction leaves Mr. Pitt bedridden; his estate lawyer suspects foul play by Elaine, then sees her suspiciously tiptoeing up to Mr. Pitt with an extra pillow.

On their Ithaca flight, Katie invites the pilot to Jerry's show. She warns Jerry to not "freak out" at seeing the pilot; Jerry has no reason to, but then cannot stop thinking about the pilot, and fumbles the entire show upon seeing him. Katie harangues the pilot, who delays the return flight just to kick Jerry off. Jerry calls Elaine for help, freaking out all the while as the lawyer eavesdrops.

At the Diplomat's Club, Earl Haffler, a charismatic Texan, tempts Kramer into betting on flight delays. Compulsively losing thousands, Kramer can only win it all back on double or nothing, and begs Newman to bring, as collateral, a collector's item mailbag he inherited from serial killer "Son of Sam"'s mail route.

Replanning their return trip, Katie inundates Jerry with choice overload until he demands she stop consulting him. Unsupervised, she drives them both off-road in the dark, and into a private swimming pool, causing Jerry to make the late night news. Mr. Pitt recognizes Jerry from the pharmacy, and the lawyer accuses Elaine of using Jerry to poison Mr. Pitt. Elaine is fired, and flashes back wistfully to times with Mr. Pitt.

With a lucky bet on Jerry's delayed flight, Kramer makes a profitable comeback. Elaine arrives to meet Bridgette, and explains that Jerry held up his own flight; Earl welshes on the bet, assuming Kramer rigged it. Jerry finally meets up with Bridgette, but then sees the pilot outside taxiing on the runway, and freaks out again.

George crashes Mr. Morgan's dinner, having Karl, the black exterminator who fumigated Jerry's apartment, pose as an old friend—but digs himself deeper when Karl fails to play along. A black waiter, confusing Morgan for Sugar Ray, finally backs up George.

== Production ==
Coming back from a stand-up tour, Jerry Seinfeld told the Seinfeld crew about how his management urgently phoned him before a performance to warn that the pilot of the flight he'd just been on was in attendance. Though this was no concern to Seinfeld, writers Tom Gammill and Max Pross imagined the outcome if he had, in fact, reacted as feared; Jerry's freakout was inspired by observing that Seinfeld, in real life, was never rattled except when persistently pestered.

They also wrote subplots in which Jerry's innocuous actions and inaction unknowingly cause disaster for the rest of the cast (getting Elaine fired, referring George to the exterminator, and tainting Kramer's bet without doing anything at all). Mr. Pitt's subplot was a parody of daytime soap opera melodrama, even casting actual soap actor Kim Zimmer. After holding auditions for the pilot, a delivery man bringing the Seinfeld crew Sparkletts bottled water was cast instead for looking like a pilot.

The titular "Diplomat's Club" in the episode is based on the Admirals Club run by American Airlines.

Due to the ambitious settings, "The Diplomat's Club" was the first episode of Seinfeld for which the majority of scenes were not filmed live before a studio audience. The sets for this episode took up two stages rather than one, due to the sheer size of the Diplomat's Club set, and the large number of sets overall, including an entire pharmacy set for just one scene. Runway footage was shot at Burbank Airport, which was shut down for the shoot thanks to Seinfeld fans on staff; the plane taxiing was simulated by towing with a truck. The cheapest scene in the episode, Jerry "freaking out" in front of news cameras, was accomplished with nothing more than some rented bushes set in front of a black backdrop.

Newman did not appear in the original script for the episode; his part was added in by Seinfeld creators Larry David and Jerry Seinfeld.

During filming of an earlier episode, Larry David remarked to Gammill and Pross that Tom Wright, who played Mr. Morgan, looks like Sugar Ray Leonard, inspiring the George story in the episode. Originally this story was to end with George being demoted to working the ticket window at Yankee Stadium, where Sugar Ray Leonard comes to pick up his tickets. Because the Seinfeld team were unable to get Leonard to appear on the show, the part with the black waiter was written as a substitute ending, though the ticket window scene — later deleted — was filmed with Wright as Leonard's stand-in.
