= The Secretary =

- Seinfeld episode
- Episode no.: Season 6 Episode 9
- Directed by: David Owen Trainor
- Written by: Carol Leifer & Marjorie Gross
- Production code: 609
- Original air date: December 8, 1994

Guest appearances
- Vicki Lewis as Ada; Steve Hytner as Kenny Bania; Joseph R. Sicari as Willie; Arminae Azarian as Saleswoman; Mitzi McCall as Donna; Richard Marion as Guy; Thomas Mills as Moviegoer; Glynis McCants as Woman; Courtney Taylor as Attractive Applicant

Episode chronology
← Previous "The Mom & Pop Store"	Next → "The Race"
- Seinfeld season 6

"The Secretary" is the 95th episode of the NBC sitcom Seinfeld. This was the ninth episode for the sixth season, airing on December 8, 1994. In this episode, George gets a secretary, Jerry catches his dry cleaner wearing his clothes, Elaine cannot trust store mirrors while trying on dresses, and Kramer sells the clothes off his back to Kenny Bania.

== Plot ==
The Yankees are hiring a secretary for George, but, not wanting sexual temptations, he rejects every attractive applicant and chooses Ada, a bookish woman, strictly for her clerical acumen.

Jerry's dry cleaner, Willie, admires Jerry's houndstooth jacket when he drops it off with his mother's fur coat. Elaine buys a "stunning" avant-garde dress at Barneys, only to find it much wider-girthed back home, and suspects that the store has skinny mirrors.

At a movie, Kramer runs into Uma Thurman and gets her number, but has nothing to write it on except Jerry's dry cleaning ticket. Jerry notices Willie at the movie wearing his jacket, then gets the jacket back and finds Willie's ticket stub still inside.

Ada's efficient anticipation of George's every need turns him on, and she reciprocates. Crying out in the throes of passion, he promises her a raise. Realizing too late he has no such authority, George unctuously pleads to Steinbrenner on Ada's behalf.

While Elaine gets the dress exchanged, Kramer comes along, dressed up, to buy women's moisturizer. He runs into Kenny Bania, who needs a new suit, and sells the clothes off his back to Bania on the spot—but then cannot leave the women's dressing room without clothes. Elaine neglects to help Kramer when, trying on a different dress, she sneaks out in search of outside mirrors. Bringing the dress back dirtied, she is forced to take it.

Jerry confronts Willie; having secretly lent the fur coat to his wife, Willie stalls Jerry by demanding his ticket. Just as Jerry finds Kramer, Bania demands his money back because Kramer's clothes—with Jerry's ticket inside—were ruined by leaked moisturizer. Kramer refuses, so Jerry promises two dinners with Bania in return for the ticket. The moisturizer has rendered the ticket unreadable, but Bania will not let Jerry off the hook. Luckily, Jerry catches Willie's wife and gets the coat back.

George is dismayed when Ada's raise leaves her making more than he does. He pleads his own case, but slinks away as Steinbrenner starts reminiscing about his youth, obliviously. As Jerry suffers through dinner with Bania once more, Bania, who read Thurman's number before it was smudged, looks forward to his date with her without even knowing who he called up.
