= The Switch (Seinfeld) =

- Seinfeld episode
- Episode no.: Season 6 Episode 11
- Directed by: Andy Ackerman
- Written by: Bruce Kirschbaum & Sam Kass
- Production code: 610
- Original air date: January 5, 1995

Guest appearances
- Wayne Knight as Newman; Sheree North as Babs Kramer; Gail Strickland as Mrs. Landis; Charlotte Lewis as Nina; Jann Karam as Sandy; Terry Sweeney as Keith; Heather Medway as Laura; Clive Rosengren as Mr. Clotworthy; Jacqueline M. Houston as Lorraine; Cheryl Francis Harrington as Waitress; Tish Smiley as Woman

Episode chronology
← Previous "The Race"	Next → "The Label Maker"
- Seinfeld season 6

"The Switch" is the 97th episode of the NBC sitcom Seinfeld, and the 11th episode of the show's sixth season. It aired on January 5, 1995. In this episode, Jerry wants to switch to dating his girlfriend's roommate, Elaine picks the wrong time to lend out Mr. Pitt's tennis racket, George suspects his girlfriend has an eating disorder, and Kramer's first name is revealed when he reconciles with his mother.

== Plot ==
While picking up Mr. Pitt's restrung racket at the tennis club, Elaine runs into Jocelyn Landis, the interviewer from Doubleday. Having reassessed Elaine's "grace", Landis tips her off to a job opening. To curry favor, Elaine lets Landis try the racket.

Jerry is dismayed that his girlfriend Sandy never laughs, even when amused. George is dating Nina, a model who stays slim despite eating ravenously, but Kramer warns that she could be bulimic. After dinner, George fails to stop Nina running to the bathroom to "freshen" as always, but thinks he hears vomiting within.

Landis tears a muscle, and becomes suicidally distraught that she may never play tennis again; seeing this, Elaine cannot bear to take the racket back. George needs a bathroom matron to help spy on Nina after dinner. Kramer tenses up at this, and reluctantly confesses that his estranged mother Babs has this job.

Jerry urges Kramer to finally reconcile with Babs, and she calls Kramer "Cosmo" in front of George. After the others crack up at Kramer's long-held secret, Kramer, no longer "running away" from his name, starts going by "Cosmo" to all and sundry.

Jerry meets Sandy's roommate Laura, who laughs easily and is also attractive. Jerry yearns to "switch" from dating one roommate to the other, defying George's warning that he asks the impossible. After an entire day racking their brains, a daring solution comes to George: Jerry can turn off Sandy and turn on Laura in one fell swoop by asking Sandy for a ménage à trois.

Elaine tries to snatch the racket in time for Mr. Pitt's game with Ethel Kennedy, but is foiled by Landis's distrustful assistant. Kramer persuades Babs to quit her job to go into business together, leaving George high and dry that night after dinner. Following Nina into the bathroom, George mistakes another woman throwing up for Nina, who really was freshening. Babs, playing a femme fatale, charms Newman.

Jerry's proposed threesome backfires when both roommates are happy to oblige. George is aghast at Jerry being too intimidated to be an "orgy guy", but admits that he too could not pull it off. For Elaine's sake, Kramer unlocks Newman's apartment because he has the same racket as Mr. Pitt, but everyone barges in on Newman making out with Babs.

== Production ==
The episode was written by Bruce Kirschbaum and Sam Henry Kass, who usually work individually, but Larry David decided to team them up for the episode. It was titled "The Bulimic" in pre-production drafts.

The name "Cosmo" was suggested by David; he took the name from a boy who lived in the same apartment building as him and Kenny Kramer. The revelation of Kramer's first name was heavily promoted by NBC in the leadup to the episode's first broadcast, and all copies of the script had "X"s in place of every instance of the name "Cosmo" to prevent it being leaked to the press. Though the episode was filmed three weeks before "The Race", it was aired after it so that the Christmas-themed "The Race" could air during the Christmas season.
