= The Face Painter =

- Seinfeld episode
- Episode no.: Season 6 Episode 23
- Directed by: Andy Ackerman
- Story by: Larry David and Fred Stoller
- Teleplay by: Larry David
- Production code: 622
- Original air date: May 11, 1995

Guest appearances
- Patrick Warburton as David Puddy; Katy Selverstone as Siena; Mark DeCarlo as Alec Berg; Raye Birk as Mr. Pless; Pierrino Mascarino as Father Hernandez; Joe Lala as Priest; Peggy Lane as Waitress; Dave Richardson as Fan #1; David Powledge as Fan #2; Jan Eddy as Fan #3; Lawrence LeJohn as Crowd Member

Episode chronology
← Previous "The Diplomat's Club"	Next → "The Understudy"
- Seinfeld season 6

"The Face Painter" is the 109th episode of the NBC sitcom Seinfeld. It is the 23rd episode of the series's sixth season. It aired on May 11, 1995. The table reading for "The Face Painter" was held on March 26, 1995. In this episode, Jerry takes a stand against "overthanking" a friend for Stanley Cup playoff tickets, David Puddy comes out to Elaine as a diehard hockey fan who paints his face, Kramer gets provoked by a chimpanzee at the zoo, and George makes an anticlimactic declaration of love.

== Plot ==
Alec Berg, a New York Rangers season pass holder, cannot make the playoffs against the New Jersey Devils; he gives Jerry tickets for one game, and promises to follow up about the next. Jerry thanks Alec several times in gratitude. George's girlfriend Siena is impressed by his opinions about toilet paper, and George is moved to make a confession of love for the first time ever.

Jerry goes to the game with Kramer and Elaine, who brings David Puddy. Puddy, a devoted Devils fan, garishly paints his face as a devil, and raises hell heckling the home team. Stoked by the Devils' win all the way home, Puddy walks in front of an elderly priest's car, and blusters at him not to cross "the Devils". George skips the game to confess to Siena, but, anticlimactically, she asks to go eat in response. George despairs that he is as good as done with her now that he showed his hand.

The next day, Jerry disobeys Kramer obliging him to call and thank Alec, insisting he gave enough thanks already. Meanwhile, Gary Fogel has died from distracted driving while adjusting his toupée; at Gary's funeral, Alec barely acknowledges Jerry. Elaine worries for the priest, a visitor from El Salvador, who has sequestered himself in terror of the "devil"'s wrath.

Siena, who works at the zoo, takes Kramer on a tour. A chimpanzee named Barry pelts Kramer with a banana peel, and he pelts Barry back. Barry starts sulking, and zoo staff make Kramer apologize to him, even though "he started it". Kramer learns that Siena is hearing-impaired in one ear; thinking he has gotten a do-over, George confesses to Siena again, only to find she heard him the first time.

Jerry explains away Alec's snub as a low-key "funeral hello", even as Alec does not call to offer tickets for the next game. Jerry defiantly waits by the phone all afternoon. Barry does not accept Kramer's finger-pointing non-apology, and spits on and jeers at him.

Puddy obligingly gives up face-painting for Elaine's sake, but he paints his chest instead to lead a row of fans painted with the letters DEVILS for that night's game. Jerry finally relents and calls Alec, too late to get his tickets—but he and Kramer are given spots in Puddy's group by painting their chests and going shirtless.

Elaine visits the priest to assuage his fears, just as the sun comes out after rain. Seeing Elaine headscarved and bathed in golden light, the priest exclaims that the Virgin Mary has come for him. (Note: The priest's dialogue, which is in Spanish and not subtitled, translates to "The Madonna...! I am not ready!")

== Production ==
Fred Stoller based Kramer's altercation with Barry the chimpanzee on a childhood visit to Monkey Jungle, during which he witnessed visitors throwing rocks at the monkeys. In the apology scene, a trainer was standing just off-camera to direct the chimpanzee's behavior.

In the original script, Kramer tells Jerry that if he no longer wants to be part of society, he should move to the bottle city of Kandor, continuing the series' tradition of Superman references. In the final draft Kandor was replaced by the East Side. The character Alec Berg was named after Alec Berg, a Seinfeld writer.

George's story arc originally had a different ending: After George tells Siena he loves her the second time, she responds, "I love you too." He then asks her to marry him, and she agrees. This ending was filmed but not used, though the idea of George becoming engaged was repurposed for the next season's premiere.

== Patrick Warburton and the New Jersey Devils ==
Patrick Warburton, who played David Puddy, grew up a fan of the Los Angeles Kings, but also acquired an affinity for the New Jersey Devils due to the episode. (He found himself with torn allegiances during the 2012 playoffs.) The season following "The Face Painter"'s broadcast, he was invited to drop the ceremonial first puck at a Devils game, and showed up with his face painted in the same way as Puddy's in the episode. After dropping the puck, he slipped and almost fell, but rescued the moment by regaining his balance and ripping off his shirt to reveal his chest was painted with the letter "D". This came to be regarded as an iconic moment in Devils history.

Warburton has often been invited to appear at Devils games with his face and chest painted, exhorting the crowd in a manner like that of his Seinfeld character. The Devils gave out a Puddy bobblehead doll to fans at a 2019 game.
