= Ellis E. Williams =

American actor

- Born: June 28, 1951 (age 75); Brunswick, Georgia, United States
- Occupations: Actor, writer, comedian, singer
- Years active: 1980–2012

Ellis E. Williams (born June 28, 1951) is a retired American film and television actor and comedian who is known for playing Henry Hughley (father of Darryl Hughley, played by comedian D. L. Hughley) on the sitcom The Hughleys.

== Early life ==
Williams was born and raised in Brunswick, Georgia, United States.

== Career ==
Williams made his television debut in 1980 on Saturday Night Live, appearing in the chorus of The Pirates of Penzance when the cast of that Broadway show was the episode's musical guest. In 1984, he appeared in a feature film, The Brother From Another Planet, as well as appearing a TV movie, Code Name: Foxfire as a street singer. He appeared in Eddie Murphy's 1987 documentary stand-up, Eddie Murphy Raw, as Eddie's uncle.

Then Williams appeared in films such as: Second Sight, Def by Temptation and Basketball Dreams. In 1991, he made his first television appearance (since SNL in 1980), on an episode of Law & Order, as Ray Bell, then he appeared in numerous films: Hangin' with the Homeboys and Strictly Business, opposite Halle Berry, Anne-Marie Johnson, Tommy Davidson, and Samuel L. Jackson. Other films include: Me and Veronica, The Saint of Fort Washington, The Little Death, A River Made to Drown In, 8 Heads in a Duffel Bag, The Glimmer Man, Eye for an Eye, among others.

Williams appeared in numerous sitcoms including: Hangin' with Mr. Cooper, Step by Step, Martin, The Jamie Foxx Show, Seinfeld, The Wayans Bros., Any Day Now and Malcolm in the Middle.

== Filmography ==
=== Film ===
Year	Title	Role	Notes
1984	The Brother from Another Planet	Watcher	
1987	Eddie Murphy Raw		
1989	Second Sight	Davey	
1990	Def by Temptation	Demon Limo Driver	
1990	Backstreet Dreams	Slick Shot	
1991	Hangin' with the Homeboys	Bobby	
1991	Strictly Business	Teddy Halloran	
1992	Me and Veronica	Bridge Guard	
1993	The Saint of Fort Washington	Metal Detector Guard	
1994	Drop Squad	Frankman	
1995	Above Suspicion	Evidence Attendant	
1996	Lawnmower Man 2: Beyond Cyberspace	Chief of Security	
1996	Eye for an Eye	Crime Scene Policeman	
1996	The Little Death	Tenant	
1996	The Glimmer Man	Brother Gaglio	
1997	8 Heads in a Duffel Bag	Newark Porter	
1997	Jackie Brown	Cockatoo Bartender	
1997	River Made to Drown In	Clerk in Liquor Store	
1999	Tropical Charlene	Sameel	
1999	Love Stinks	Minister	
2000	The Adventures of Rocky and Bullwinkle	Security Guard	(as Ellis E. Williams)
2000	Attention Shoppers	Luke	
2001	Kingdom Come	Woodrow 'Bud' Slocumb	Uncredited
2001	Ali	Family Photo Man	
2002	Antwone Fisher	Reverend Tate	
2003	Elephant	GSA Teacher	
2003	The Battle of Shaker Heights	Charlie Hayes	
2004	The Girl Next Door	Scholarship President	
2004	Coming Up Easy	Alfred	
2007	Totally Baked	Dad	(Segment "Diff'rent Tokes")
2007	Ocean Without a Shore		
2008	Only for You	Dale	Short
2009	Man of Her Dreams	Pastor	
2009	17 Again	Bailiff	
2010	Morning	Bartender	
2012	The Last Fall	Mr. Edwards	

=== Television ===
Year	Title	Role	Notes
1994	Martin	Bailiff	Episode: "No Justice, No Peace"
1994	The Fresh Prince of Bel-Air	Curtis	Episode: "Fresh Prince: The Movie"
1995	Seinfeld	Exterminator	Episode: "The Doodle"
1995	Seinfeld	Karl (same character as in "The Doodle")	Episode: "The Diplomat's Club"
1997	The Outer Limits	Donald	Episode: "Dead Man's Switch"
1997	The Steve Harvey Show	Lynwood Grier	Episode: "I Do, I Don't"
2011	Bones	Tom	Episode: "The Male in the Mail"
2014	Love That Girl	Latrell's Lawyer	Episode: "Secret Swingers"
