= The Fusilli Jerry =

- Seinfeld episode
- Episode no.: Season 6 Episode 21
- Directed by: Andy Ackerman
- Story by: Marjorie Gross & Jonathan Gross and Ron Hauge & Charlie Rubin
- Teleplay by: Marjorie Gross
- Production code: 619
- Original air date: April 27, 1995

Guest appearances
- Jerry Stiller as Frank Costanza; Estelle Harris as Estelle Costanza; Patrick Warburton as David Puddy; Marla Sucharetza as Nancy Klopper; Lou Cutell as Dr. Howard Cooperman; Yvette Cruise as Clerk; Jeff Coopwood as Security Guard; Judith Shelton as Sally; Apollo Dukakis as Dr. Bakersoll

Episode chronology
← Previous "The Doodle"	Next → "The Diplomat's Club"
- Seinfeld season 6

"The Fusilli Jerry" is the 107th episode of the NBC sitcom Seinfeld. This is the 21st episode of the sixth season. It aired on April 27, 1995. In this episode, Jerry falls out with David Puddy for stealing his move during sex, only to deprive Elaine of sexual pleasure and himself of a trusted mechanic. Kramer gets issued the license plate "ASSMAN", and makes a pasta sculpture of Jerry.

Since its release, "The Fusilli Jerry" has seen positive critical reception and has appeared on rankings of the best Seinfeld episodes.

== Plot ==
Kramer is due to pick up new license plates, but, in a mix-up, the Department of Motor Vehicles issues the vanity plate "ASSMAN" in his name.

Elaine is dating David Puddy, Jerry's friend and "the only honest mechanic in New York". During sex, Puddy performs a move that Jerry is known for using. Having told Puddy this move himself, Jerry feels betrayed. George, unable to pleasure his girlfriend Nancy, is in need of Jerry's move; Jerry instructs George in meticulous detail, and expects him to do the move justice.

On a whim, Kramer makes a miniature sculpture of Jerry out of fusilli. He suspects that ASSMAN is proctologist humor, since hilarious, improbable cases of rectal foreign bodies abound in their line of work. This gives Jerry ideas for where he would like to put Kramer's sculpture.

Jerry calls out Puddy for stealing his move; Puddy insists he could have thought it up himself, but loses enthusiasm for the move, to Elaine's dismay. Helping George pick up Estelle from a clinic after her eye job, Kramer gets away with using staff parking by passing off his car as a proctologist's. Driving back, he brakes hard and reaches out to brace Estelle, just short of touching her breast.

Jerry takes his business to a different mechanic, who gives him an inflated repair estimate. Elaine is underwhelmed by Puddy debuting a "new move", which George recognizes as his own. A phone number left on Kramer's windshield turns out to be from a big-bottomed woman.

After botching Jerry's move once, George aces it, giving Nancy an eye-opening experience—but she is disgusted that he needed crib notes. To get Jerry a new estimate, Elaine unceremoniously asks Puddy in bed; seeing the difference, Jerry, valuing a good mechanic over sex, yields his move to Puddy. Estelle smugly assumes Kramer was wooing her by "stopping short", but Frank, who used this move on her forty years ago, assumes that Kramer stole it. Frank picks a fight with Kramer, but falls on the fusilli Jerry, jamming it up his rectum.

Frank takes his improbable case to a proctologist, who turns out to be the rightful owner of the ASSMAN plates. After Frank recovers from his ordeal, Estelle sheds tears of relief, ruining her eye job.

== Production ==
"The Fusilli Jerry" had a large number of writers. Marjorie Gross and her brother Jonathan came up with the Jerry, George, and Elaine stories; Ron Hauge and Charlie Rubin came up with the license plate story; and Marjorie Gross wrote the actual teleplay. The writers had not intended for David Puddy to be funny himself, only to serve as a foil to Elaine, and so were impressed with how funny Patrick Warburton made the character in his audition.

The sequence where Frank Costanza falls on "Fusilli Jerry" required numerous takes, with actor Jerry Stiller making a different vocalization of pain on each take. Throughout the scene Julia Louis-Dreyfus, who played Elaine, had to dig her fingernails into her skin to keep from breaking out into laughter at Stiller's performance; she can be seen doing this in the finished episode when Stiller first comes in.

== Reception ==
"The Fusilli Jerry" has generally attracted positive reception from critics. In 1995, John P. McCarthy of Variety said of the episode, "Only Seinfeld could deal with proctology, lovemaking techniques and corkscrew pasta in the same half-hour, and with hilarious results." David Sims of The A.V. Club called the episode "the 'classic' episode of season 6, the episode with tropes everyone remembers, much like 'The Puffy Shirt' of season 5, 'The Contest' of season 4 and so on and so forth." Sims also praised the clever intersection of the episode's plotlines as well as Kramer's story arc, dubbing the episode the "best Kramer episode ever."

Rolling Stone named the episode one of the "10 Seinfeld Episodes You Forgot You Loved" that gets "unfairly overlooked." Vulture named "The Fusilli Jerry" the fourteenth best Seinfeld episode, praising the "brilliant way" Kramer stops short on Estelle Costanza as well as the introduction of David Puddy.

== Callback ==
- In the Seinfeld episode "The Understudy", Kramer gives Bette Midler a "Macaroni Midler" and Frank stops short with his ex-lover from his time in Korea. Calling back to this episode's "Fusilli Jerry" and "stopping short".
