= The Race (Seinfeld) =

- Seinfeld episode
- Episode no.: Season 6 Episode 10
- Directed by: Andy Ackerman
- Story by: Tom Gammill & Max Pross and Larry David & Sam Kass
- Teleplay by: Tom Gammill & Max Pross & Larry David
- Production code: 612
- Original air date: December 15, 1994

Guest appearances
- Todd Kimsey as Ned Isakoff; Vicki Lewis as Ada; Don McManus as Duncan Meyer; Renee Props as Lois; Michael Sorich as Fidel Castro; Danny Woodburn as Mickey Abbott; Claude Earl Jones as Mr. Bevilaqua; Mark Christopher Lawrence as Boss; Denise Poirier as Arlene; Spencer Klein as Kid; Martin Chow as Lew; Eva Svensson as Woman; Lee Bear as George Steinbrenner (uncredited); Larry David as George Steinbrenner (voice) (uncredited)

Episode chronology
← Previous "The Secretary"	Next → "The Switch"
- Seinfeld season 6

"The Race" is the 96th episode of the American sitcom Seinfeld, the tenth episode of the sixth season. The episode first aired on December 15, 1994. In this episode, Jerry must vindicate his legendary, but illegitimate, high school race win against the only classmate to suspect the truth. Elaine's communist boyfriend inspires George to answer a communist personal ad, and Kramer to become a communist while working as a department store Santa Claus.

"The Race" was one of Jerry Seinfeld's favorite episodes of Seinfeld due to its Superman themes.

== Plot ==
Jerry is "finally" dating a woman named Lois, allowing him to indulge in gratuitous Superman references. To his chagrin, Lois's boss is former high school classmate Duncan Meyer. Elaine does not pay when Hop Sing's delivers the wrong Chinese food to her door, and gets put on a delivery blacklist.

George finds Elaine's boyfriend Ned's copy of the Daily Worker, and clues Elaine in that Ned is a communist. He is excited to find, inside, a personals ad which is indiscriminate as to appearance. Jerry confides his history with Duncan: in a school track race, Jerry accidentally jumped the gun, but no one else noticed, giving him a prodigious win that went unquestioned by all but Duncan. To uphold his legend, Jerry never raced again.

Kramer gets hired as a department store Santa, with Mickey as his Christmas elf. Working the long shift without a break pushes Kramer to his limit. Elaine enjoys the novelty of dating a communist, but, when she leaves Ned alone with the discontented Kramer, Ned jumps on the chance to proselytize.

When Duncan shares his long-held suspicion with Lois, Jerry lies to her just to spite Duncan, then must confront them both over lunch. George volunteers to vouch for Jerry by pretending to run into him for the first time since high school. At lunch, they use this pretense to put each other down, and George nearly gets carried away with self-aggrandizing lies. Not satisfied by George's testimony, Duncan challenges Jerry to a rematch, even inviting their old classmates.

Kramer gets converted by Ned's literature, then tries to preach communism as Santa to a child on his lap, setting off a Red Scare and getting both himself and Mickey fired. At Elaine's, Ned insists on ordering from Hop Sing's, which once provided succor for his blacklisted communist father. Elaine is forced to use Ned's name to circumvent her own ban, but her "naming names" gets Ned blacklisted as well. George is overheard at work taking a call from the Daily Worker, which gets back to Steinbrenner. Before George can explain, Steinbrenner sends him to Havana to use political sympathies to scout Cuban baseball players.

Duncan threatens to fire Lois if Jerry backs out of the rematch, and wagers a raise and a paid trip to Hawaii for her if Jerry wins. On race day, though Jerry has no hope, Kramer's nearby car back-fires just before the starting gun, confusing the crowd and cuing Jerry to jump the gun unnoticed again. In slow motion, Jerry triumphs to the crowd's jubilation.

In Cuba, Fidel Castro fêtes George, a "comunista simpático", as his guest of honor.

== Pop culture references ==
A recurring joke throughout Seinfeld is the references to Superman; the theme features prominently in "The Race". Jerry's line to Lois, "Faster than a speeding bullet, Lois," is a reference to the Superman series, Adventures of Superman. He also at one time says, "Why, I'd have to be Superman to do that, Lois." At the end of the episode, Jerry breaks the fourth wall and winks to the camera after he says, "Maybe I will, Lois. Maybe I will." This was the first and only instance of breaking the fourth wall in the series, excluding the retrospective "The Highlights of 100" and "The Clip Show". The wink towards the camera is a reference to the older Superman television series and Silver Age comics.

Jerry's declaration "I choose not to run" is a reference to President Calvin Coolidge's statement "I do not choose to run".

The Daily Worker was a Communist newspaper that ceased publication in 1958; it is presented in this episode as still being in print. Lois makes a reference to Duncan controlling the means of production, a relevant part of Marxist theory. Cold War paranoia is lampooned through a young boy and Kramer's boss making "traitor", "commie" and "pinko" accusations while Mickey tries to keep him quiet, as well as Hop Sing's blacklisting of Elaine and George's conversation with Steinbrenner about being a communist.

== Production ==
The phone conversation between George and Natalie was ad-libbed by actor Jason Alexander, who performed almost completely different versions of the conversation in each of the scene's several takes.

Jerry Seinfeld tried wearing a brightly colored, skintight racing outfit for the climactic race scene, but co-creator Larry David and director Andy Ackerman both felt the outfit was excessive, so Seinfeld changed into normal wear.

The shooting script for the episode was 70 pages, as opposed to the usual 40–50 pages for a sitcom script, and the filmed content far exceeded the show's half-hour time slot. As a result, numerous scenes were deleted, including an entire subplot showing how Kramer helped George obtain a visa so that he could get to Cuba. Other cuts included Kramer defending his skinny appearance in the role of Santa Claus.
