= The Gymnast =

- Seinfeld episode
- Episode no.: Season 6 Episode 6
- Directed by: Andy Ackerman
- Written by: Alec Berg & Jeff Schaffer
- Production code: 606
- Original air date: November 3, 1994

Guest appearances
- Ian Abercrombie as Justin Pitt; Lois Nettleton as Mrs. Enright; Elina Löwensohn as Katya; David Blackwood as Beck; Maurice Godin as Misha; Jessica Hecht as Lindsay Enright; Damian London as Party Guest; James Sweeney as Aronson; Phil Ramsey as Man in Car

Episode chronology
← Previous "The Couch"	Next → "The Soup"
- Seinfeld season 6

"The Gymnast" is the 92nd episode of Seinfeld. This was the sixth episode for the sixth season. It aired on November 3, 1994, during a special "Blackout Thursday" night on NBC, in which all shows in the Must See TV line-up, except this one, featured a fictional New York City blackout (e.g., Friends episode "The One with the Blackout"). Instead, in this episode, Jerry is tantalized by the prospect of sex with an Olympic gymnast, Kramer's autostereogram poster holds Mr. Pitt in its thrall, George gets caught eating trash by his girlfriend's mother, and Kramer is tormented by a kidney stone.

== Plot ==
Jerry is dating Katya, a Romanian gymnast and Olympic silver medalist. Kramer ballyhoos the pleasures of sex with a gymnast, and wants Jerry to "pay the price" of putting in time with her in return, even though they have nothing to talk about except the tyranny of Nicolae Ceaușescu. George reveals that he always goes shirtless in private on the toilet.

Mr. Pitt forbids pens, so Elaine throws her fountain pen in her purse. Kramer gets Mr. Pitt hooked searching for the hidden 3D image in an autostereogram poster, but runs off to the doctor in sudden pain and forgets his poster. Kramer gets diagnosed with a kidney stone.

George visits his girlfriend Lindsay Enright's family, where, being "better with the mothers" than their daughters, he charms all the older women. However, Mrs. Enright catches him furtively eating an éclair out of her trash. George's only defense is that it was "on top" of the trash and marked with only one bite.

Glued to Kramer's poster, Mr. Pitt abrogates his board meeting for spring water bottler Morgan Springs to acquire Poland Creek, and sends Elaine. Having nothing to contribute, Elaine can only nitpick Mr. Pitt naming the merged company "Moland Springs". Taking this seriously, the board has second thoughts.

Kramer brings a tape of Katya's feats of agility from the 1984 Olympics, finally convincing Jerry that sexual delights await him. However, Katya considers her dexterity "only useful in gymnastics", and Jerry is let down when she does not mount him like a gymnastics apparatus during sex. Elaine obliges him to put in three more weeks with Katya in return.

George explains himself to Lindsay, then must do so again when he dumps a cup of coffee on an occupied car, and Mrs. Enright sees him working like a squeegee man to appease the angry driver. Having now racked up two strikes, George drops by Mrs. Enright's party, where he uses the bathroom and gets mesmerized by an autostereogram poster inside. In a daze, he exits shirtless in front of all the guests.

Blaming Kramer for being stuck with Katya, Jerry drags him along on a date at the circus, where Katya's former teammate Misha is a tightrope walker. Kramer staggers to the bathroom to pass the stone, with a howl of agony that fills the big top and makes Misha fall off the high wire. Katya dumps Jerry, having only put in time with him because her country ballyhoos the pleasures of sex with a comedian.

The board summons Pitt to an emergency meeting. Flustered, with hands covered in ink from her purse, Elaine grabs Pitt and finally snaps him out of gaping at the poster. Wearing his riding jacket at a podium, with his lip stained like a Hitler moustache, Pitt vows to the board to "annex Poland" while heralding their stock growth with raised hand.

== Critical response ==
Barbara Ching wrote about Katya's expectations, "The comedian, in other words, embodies a procreative life force that Jerry negates. The laughter he provokes leads to nothing but a one-night stand." Dr. Michael Dunne wrote in his essay "Seinfeld as Intertextual Comedy":

Pitt is admittedly wearing Austrian-looking clothes (because he had earlier hoped to go horseback riding in the park), and he has a thick black mustache on his upper lip (because he accidentally touched himself with ink-stained fingers), but Mr. Pitt is nothing like Hitler in any significant way. The intertextual joke is purely physical, and it requires little knowledge of history or politics. In fact, the less one knows about the Second World War, the funnier the joke is. Funny or not, however, it is apparent that the writers, Alec Berg and Jeff Schaffer, intended to communicate with their audience intertextually through this image.

David Sims of The A.V. Club gave the episode an A− and wrote, "This is one of those Seinfeld episodes that disguises just how callous Jerry is being towards a woman through script innuendo ... George's plot feeds in nicely from last week, which was like a prelude to the imbecility on show this week. He inexplicably keeps getting chances with Lindsay despite ridiculous behavior like eating out of the trash and looking like a squeegee man, as if his ability to explain his way out of situations is messing with the universe's attempts to end the relationship."

In ranking the best Seinfeld episodes, Vanity Fair had it at 126th,Screencrush had this episode at 44th, and Vulture had it at 19th.
