= The Label Maker =

- Seinfeld episode
- Episode no.: Season 6 Episode 12
- Directed by: Andy Ackerman
- Written by: Alec Berg & Jeff Schaffer
- Production code: 611
- Original air date: January 19, 1995

Guest appearances
- Bryan Cranston as Tim Whatley; Wayne Knight as Newman; Jessica Tuck as Bonnie; Cleto Augusto as Scott; Wayne Grace as Ukrainian

Episode chronology
← Previous "The Switch"	Next → "The Scofflaw"
- Seinfeld season 6

"The Label Maker" is the 98th episode of the NBC sitcom Seinfeld. This was the 12th episode for the sixth season. It aired on January 19, 1995. In this episode, Tim Whatley gifts and "de-gifts" a spare Super Bowl ticket he got from Jerry; Elaine suspects Whatley re-gifted her label maker to Jerry; George is jealous of his girlfriend's male roommate; and Kramer cannot trust Newman alone with their paused game of Risk. The episode popularized the term regifting.

== Plot ==
After getting prime Super Bowl tickets for free, Jerry must give them away to be in "the Drake"'s wedding party on the same day. No one wants the tickets except Tim Whatley. As thanks, Whatley sends Jerry a label maker. Elaine recognizes this as her own Christmas present to Whatley, but cannot be sure if it was re-gifted.

Kramer and Newman put a prolonged game of Risk on pause, but, expecting Newman to tamper with the board, Kramer takes it to Jerry for safekeeping.

George visits his girlfriend Bonnie's apartment, and becomes infatuated with the decor, especially the velvet couch. He is perturbed that Bonnie has a male roommate, Scott, with the same build and stature as himself. Jealous of Scott's "inside" advantage, George wants to take his place.

The Drake breaks up with another fiancée when he tries to postpone the wedding to make time for the Super Bowl. However, Jerry is too late to "de-gift" the tickets, and Newman, having gotten Whatley's spare ticket as his mailman, taunts Jerry.

George pries into how intimately Bonnie and Scott share their space, then rails at their "unnatural" living arrangement. To accommodate George, Bonnie evicts Scott. Realizing that he has gone exclusive with Bonnie, George kicks himself.

Elaine asks to go up to Whatley's apartment as pretext to look for the label maker, inadvertently propositioning to him. She gets Newman's ticket in return, but, on Jerry's warning, shuts down Whatley's hopes of sleeping with her. Disappointed, Whatley gives the ticket back to Jerry.

Despite Kramer watching Jerry's door, Jerry comes home to Newman breaking in through the fire escape. When the game resumes, Kramer's car gets towed, and he chases the tow truck with game board in hand. The game continues on a subway ride to the impound yard, but Kramer's belligerence towards Newman's Ukraine offends a Ukrainian man, who upends the board with a punch. Newman is pleased to get out of his impending defeat.

Elaine makes Whatley come clean about re-gifting the label maker, which turned out to be defective. They remorsefully kiss and make up, and Whatley gives up his ticket to be with Elaine. At the Super Bowl, Jerry sits crammed next to a smug Newman.

George helps Bonnie ship off Scott's things using the label maker, only to find her apartment completely bare because she never had furniture of her own. The address labels fall off, and Scott's undeliverable packages end up as Newman's spoils. Desperate to break up, George tries to scandalize Bonnie by asking for a ménage à trois, but, to his horror, gets welcomed into a threesome with her and Scott.

== Production ==
Writers Alec Berg and Jeff Schaffer came up with multiple endings to the episode's different plot threads. One of the endings considered for the Risk story was a worker at the impound lot giving Newman a strategy that allows him to overcome Kramer's strong lead and win the game. George's subplot was originally to end with Bonnie taking pity on Scott after he loses all his things in the mail, leading her to let him move back in and form a sexual relationship with him, thus fulfilling George's original fear. However, after Berg and Schaffer saw the script for "The Switch" they wanted to do a callback to that episode.

Unlike most Seinfeld episodes, the first draft of the script was taken directly to the table-read without any rewriting from Seinfeld creators Larry David and Jerry Seinfeld, though David and Seinfeld added some material to the script, such as Jerry's comments about repeating the name of a gift and George and Jerry's discussion of how a male roommate has the advantage over a boyfriend.

George's sneeze after Jerry tells him that he blamed him for his party crashing in "The Mom & Pop Store" was unscripted, prompting the director to call "Cut", but it was kept in during the editing phase. Actress Julia Louis-Dreyfus had a bad cold during the filming; since Bryan Cranston had to perform a mouth-to-mouth kiss with her, he came down with the same cold two days later.

== Legacy ==
The script of "The Label Maker" is quoted in the Oxford English Dictionary as the earliest known use of the word regifter.

The episode's scene on the subway with the conversation about Ukraine became widely popular after the 2022 Russian invasion of Ukraine.
