= Macaroni art =

Art made out of pasta

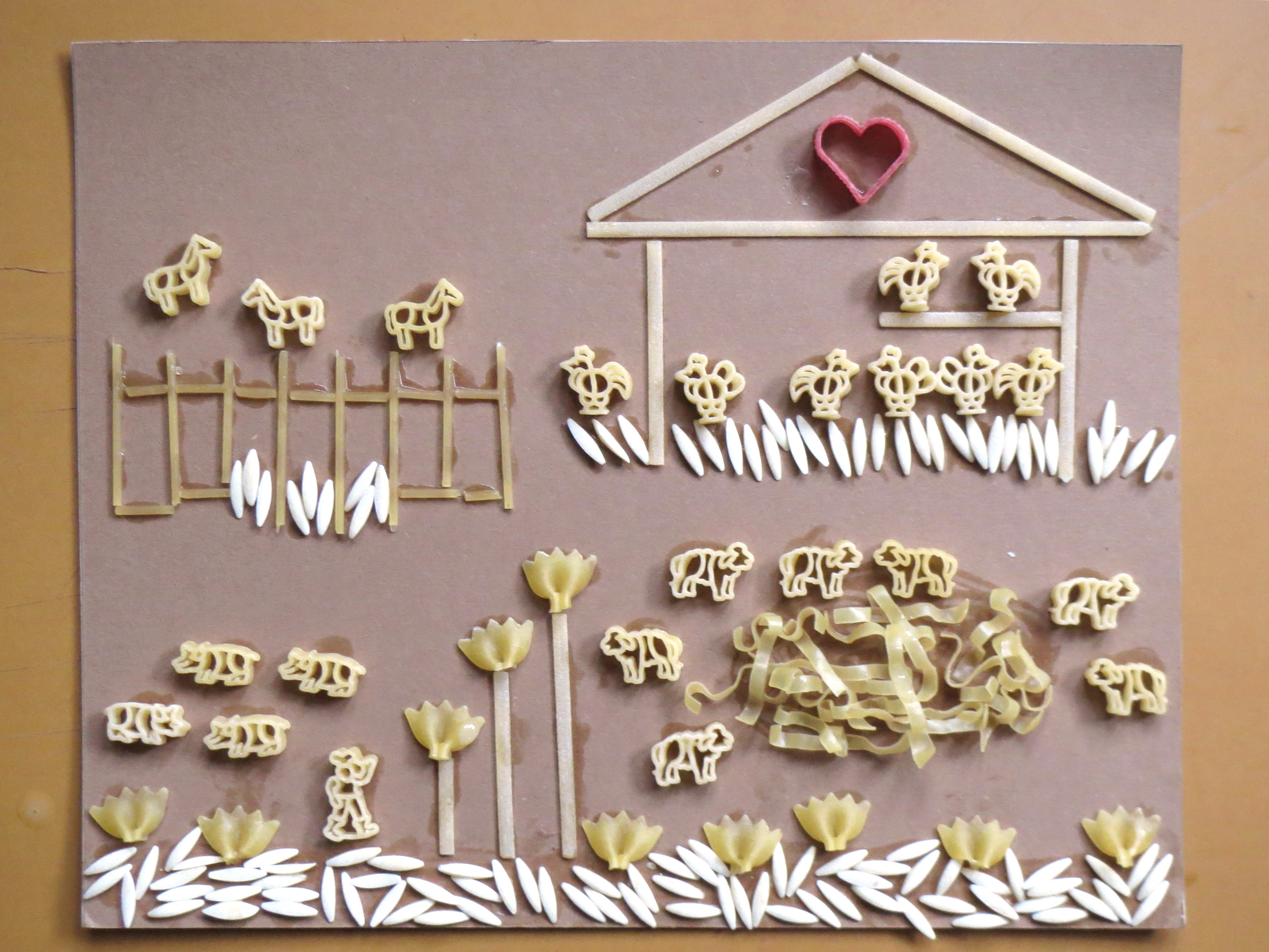
A picture made using different shapes of pasta

Macaroni art, sometimes referred to as macaroni crafts or pasta art, is artwork that is made of dry macaroni or other pasta. The works commonly consist of individual pieces of macaroni glued to a surface to produce a mosaic. However, works may take the form of sculptures.

This type of art is produced during arts and crafts classes at pre-school.

== In popular culture ==
Pasta art was used to advertise a Nancy Sinatra concert at the Fillmore Auditorium in San Francisco, California. The art the poster was made from is composed entirely of Pasta e Fagioli (pasta and beans). Alphabet pasta spells out the lyrics for her 1965 song "These Boots Are Made for Walkin'".

Another example of pasta art was featured in "The Fusilli Jerry" episode of the American television sitcom Seinfeld, in which Cosmo Kramer produced a small sculpture of Jerry Seinfeld made of fusilli.

A macaroni art portrait of the Queen of Space was featured in an episode of the American animated science fiction sitcom Futurama.

In Episode 9 of the first season of the American animated sitcom The Simpsons, Lisa Simpson gave Marge a macaroni portrait as a gift.
