= Gail Strickland =

American actress (born 1945)

- Strickland in 1988
- Born: May 18, 1945 (age 81); Birmingham, Alabama, U.S.
- Occupation: Actress
- Years active: 1966–2008
- Spouse: Neil Baker (m. 1990)
- Children: 1

Gail Strickland (born May 18, 1945) is a retired American actress who had supporting roles in such films as The Drowning Pool (1975), Bound for Glory (1976), Who'll Stop the Rain (1978), Norma Rae (1979), and Protocol (1984), and appeared regularly on various network television shows.

== Early years ==
Born in Birmingham, Alabama, Strickland is one of five children of Theodosia and Lynn Strickland, who owned a large tire dealership. She was tall for her age in her youth, and she said, "When boys started looking differently at girls, I wasn't one of the ones they looked differently at." She turned to writing and performing plays as a way of attracting attention.

Strickland graduated from Brooke Hill School in Birmingham. She went to Florida State University, where she was a gymnast, was the first female clown with the university's circus, and received a teaching certificate in English. During her college summers she worked in community theater in Sarasota, Florida.

Following college, Strickland was a governess in Spain for two months, and then worked as a waitress in Cape Cod. After that she moved to New York, working as a receptionist for an advertising agency while she studied improvisational acting. That was followed by her attendance at Sanford Meisner Drama School. During those times she did some acting in commercials and soap operas.

== Career ==
In 1973, Strickland appeared as Sister Ann in the season four episode, "Almost a Nun's Story", on The Mary Tyler Moore Show. She appeared on the television series M*A*S*H as Captain Helen Whitfield, a nurse in an ongoing battle with alcoholism. She appeared as Courtney, Jerry's love interest, in the episodes titled "Jerry Robinson Crusoe" (3.13) and “My Boy Guillermo” (4.19) of The Bob Newhart Show. She appeared in the pilot episode of the television series Night Court as the public defender. She also guest-starred in the Cagney & Lacey episode "Suffer the Children" season one, episode four. Strickland played a struggling rancher's daughter in the 1987 Highway to Heaven episode "A Dream of Wild Horses", alongside actor Richard Farnsworth. She played nurse practitioner Marilyn McGrath in the 1988 TV series HeartBeat. This was one of the earliest portrayals of a lesbian character on American network television.

Strickland appeared in 11 episodes of Dr. Quinn, Medicine Woman, from 1993 to 1994, as the character Olive Davis. She guest-starred in the Star Trek: Deep Space Nine episode "Paradise", as the character Alixus. In 1994–95, she appeared as Mrs. Landis of Doubleday in the Seinfeld season six episodes "The Chaperone" and "The Switch". She appeared on the U.S. Navy series JAG first-season episode "War Cries" as Ambassador Bartlett, the U.S. ambassador to Peru. Strickland also played Esther MacInerney, the wife of Martin Sheen's presidential chief of staff character, in the 1995 movie The American President. She played Dr. Rene Spielman on ER season six, episode six, "The Peace of Wild Things".

Strickland was a cast member in the brief run of the 2002 CBS television series First Monday, playing an Associate Justice of the Supreme Court of the United States.

== Personal life ==
Strickland married Neil Baker, and they have a daughter together. She also has a stepson.

She was diagnosed with spasmodic dysphonia in the early 1990s. The condition affects her speech; she continued working for 15 years before it became too debilitating for her to deliver her lines, resulting in her retirement from acting.

== Filmography ==
=== Film ===
Year	Title	Role
1975	The Drowning Pool	Mavis Kilbourne
1976	Bittersweet Love	Roz
1976	Bound for Glory	Pauline
1977	One on One	B.J. Rudolph
1978	Who'll Stop the Rain	Charmian
1979	Norma Rae	Bonnie Mae
1983	Uncommon Valor	Helen Rhodes
1983	Lies	Jessica Brenner
1984	Oxford Blues	Las Vegas Lady
1984	Protocol	Mrs. St. John
1986	Hyper Sapien: People from Another Star	Myrna King
1991	The Man in the Moon	Marie Foster
1993	Three of Hearts	Yvonne
1994	When a Man Loves a Woman	Pam
1994	Last Time Out	Becky Davis
1995	How to Make an American Quilt	The Mrs.
1995	The American President	Esther MacInerney
2008	My Apocalypse	Victoria Eastman

=== Television ===
Year	Title	Role	Notes
1969	Dark Shadows	Dorcas Trilling	"1.751", "1.766"
1969	Guiding Light	Nurse	"5628", "5629", "5631"
1973	The Mary Tyler Moore Show	Sister Ann Hutchins	"Almost a Nun's Story"
1974	Barnaby Jones	Susan Taylor	"Friends Till Death"
1974	Police Story	Julie Keegan	"Country Boy"
1974	Hawaii Five-O	Elena Lewis / Forbes	"Killer at Sea", "How to Steal a Masterpiece"
1974–75	The Bob Newhart Show	Courtney Simpson	"Jerry Robinson Crusoe", "My Boy Guillermo"
1975	Harry O	Laura Mayo	"Silent Kill"
1975	Ellery Queen	Gail Stevens	"Too Many Suspects"
1975	My Father's House	Paula	TV film
1975	The Rookies	Beverly Shore	"The Voice of Thunder"
1976	Kojak	Monica	"Justice Deferred"
1976	The Dark Side of Innocence	Heather	TV film
1977	Westside Medical	Aileen Baker	"The Devil & the Deep Blue Sea"
1977	A Love Affair: The Eleanor and Lou Gehrig Story	Dorothy	TV film
1977	The Gathering	Peggy	TV film
1978	The President's Mistress	Gwen Bowers	TV film
1978	Lou Grant	Liz Harrison	"Scandal"
1978	Ski Lift to Death	Vicki Gordon	TV film
1979	Letters from Frank	Marlene	TV film
1979	The Gathering, Part II	Peggy	TV film
1980	King Crab	Vicky	TV film
1980	Rape and Marriage: The Rideout Case	Jean Christensen	TV film
1981	A Matter of Life and Death	Mary Coggins	TV film
1981	M*A*S*H	Capt. Helen Whitfield	"Bottoms Up"
1981	Walking Tall	Lynn Hudson	"Deadly Impact"
1981	Darkroom	Helen	"Siege of 31 August"
1982	Trapper John, M.D.	Dr. Curtis	"Doctors and Other Strangers"
1982	Alice	Julia Roberts	"Give My Regrets to Broadway"
1982	My Body, My Child	Adele	TV film
1982	Eleanor, First Lady of the World	Anna Roosevelt	TV film
1982	The Six of Us	Sally Benjamin-Tree	TV film
1982	ABC Afterschool Special	Mrs. Watson	"Amy & the Angel"
1982	Life of the Party: The Story of Beatrice	Abbie	TV film
1982, 1984	Hill Street Blues	Gail Kennedy	"Invasion of the Third World Body Snatchers", "The Other Side of Oneness"
1982, 1984	Cagney & Lacey	Ruth Dawes / Mrs. Tanton	"Suffer the Children", "Fathers & Daughters"
1983	Starflight: The Plane That Couldn't Land	Nancy Gilliam	TV film
1983	Hardcastle and McCormick	Agatha 'Aggy' Wainwright	"Flying Down to Rio"
1984	Night Court	Sheila Gardiner	"All You Need Is Love"
1984	Family Ties	Dorothy Canell	"Ladies' Man"
1984	Emerald Point N.A.S.	Dr. Robards	Recurring role
1984	Fame	Becky Guest	"The Ballad of Ray Claxton"
1985	Dallas	Veronica Robinson	"Winds of War", "Shattered Dreams", "Terms of Estrangement"
1985	On Our Way	Melinda	TV film
1985–86	The Insiders	Alice West	Main role
1986	Spenser: For Hire	Mildred Frances	"She Loves Me, She Loves Me Not"
1986–87	What a Country!	Principal Joan Courtney	Main role (season 1)
1987	CBS Schoolbreak Special	Kay Webb	"An Enemy Among Us"
1987	Highway to Heaven	Billie Harwood	"A Dream of Wild Horses"
1987	Murder, She Wrote	Kate Hollander	"Steal Me a Story"
1988–89	Heartbeat	Marilyn McGrath, N.P.	Main role
1991	Civil Wars	Lisa Wharton	"The Pound and the Fury"
1991	WIOU	Beatrice Hudson	"Three Women and a Baby", "One Flew Over the Anchor Desk"
1992	The Burden of Proof	Fiona Cawley	TV miniseries
1993	Spies	Mrs. Mills	TV film
1993	Silent Cries	Roberta Hampton	TV film
1993	Law & Order	Ellen Gorham	"Promises to Keep"
1993	Dr. Quinn, Medicine Woman	Olive Davis	Recurring role (season 1)
1993	Remember	Amanda	TV film
1994	Star Trek: Deep Space Nine	Alixus	"Paradise"
1994	Murder, She Wrote	Edith Peabody	"To Kill a Legend"
1994–95	Seinfeld	Ms. Landis	"The Chaperone", "The Switch"
1994–1998	Melrose Place	Katherine Andrews	Recurring role (seasons 2–7)
1995	A Mother's Prayer	Ruth	TV film
1995	JAG	Ambassador Bartlett	"War Cries"
1997	Walker, Texas Ranger	Dr. Janet Monroe	"Forgotten People"
1997	The Pretender	Grace Carter-Welman	"Over the Edge"
1998	Profiler	Melinda Moscone	"Birthright"
1998	Michael Hayes	Rose	"Imagine: Parts 1 & 2"
1998	Life of the Party: The Pamela Harriman Story	Betsey Cushing Roosevelt Whitney	TV film
1999	Chicago Hope	Shirley Fleming	"Playing Through"
1999	Providence	Evelyn Lombard	"You Can't Hurry Love"
1999	ER	Dr. Renee Spielman	"The Peace of Wild Things"
2002	First Monday	Justice Deborah Szwark	Main role
