= Lou Cutell =

American actor (1930–2021)

- Cutell as Dr. Howard Cooperman in the 1995 Seinfeld episode The Fusilli Jerry
- Born: October 6, 1930; New York City, U.S.
- Died: November 21, 2021 (aged 91); Los Angeles, California, U.S.
- Education: University of California, Los Angeles
- Occupation: Actor
- Years active: 1961–2021

Lou Cutell (October 6, 1930 – November 21, 2021) was an American actor. He was best known for his appearance as Amazing Larry in the 1985 film Pee-wee's Big Adventure.

== Life and career ==
Cutell was born in New York City to Sicilian parents. He moved with his family to Los Angeles, California, where he received a bachelor's degree at the University of California.

Cutell began his acting career in 1961, appearing in the Broadway play The Young Abe Lincoln in the role of William Berry

Cutell made his television debut in 1964, guest-starring in The Dick Van Dyke Show.

From the 1970s to the 1990s Cutell appeared and guest-starred in numerous films and television programs including Seinfeld, The Love Boat, Honey, I Shrunk the Kids, Alice, The Bob Newhart Show, Rhinoceros, The World's Greatest Lover, The Wild Wild West, The Mary Tyler Moore Show (and its spin-off Lou Grant), Barney Miller, The Black Marble, The Odd Couple II, Pee-wee's Big Adventure, My Mom's a Werewolf and Bridget Loves Bernie.

In the 1990s Cutell scripted and appeared in the Broadway play The Sicilian Bachelor. In 2010, Cutell starred in the Broadway play Viagara Falls, which he co-wrote with Joao Machado.

Cutell also continued appearing in film and television. He played a recurring role in Betty White's Off Their Rockers and guest-starred in other television programs. His final role was in the medical drama Grey's Anatomy, in 2015.

== Death ==
Cutell died on November 21, 2021, at the age of 91.
