= The Scofflaw =

- Seinfeld episode
- Episode no.: Season 6 Episode 13
- Directed by: Andy Ackerman
- Written by: Peter Mehlman
- Production code: 613
- Original air date: January 26, 1995

Guest appearances
- Wayne Knight as Newman; Richard Fancy as Lippman; Marty Rackham as Jake Jarmel; Barbara Alyn Woods as Debby; Ivory Ocean as Officer Morgan; Basil Hoffman as Salesman; Lillian Lehman as Judge; Jon Lovitz as Gary Fogel; Danny Breen as Guy With Glasses; Bob Shaw as Cabbie; Dale Harimoto as Reporter; Joe Ochman as Customer; Elisabeth Sjoli as Woman

Episode chronology
← Previous "The Label Maker"	Next → "The Highlights of 100"
- Seinfeld season 6

"The Scofflaw" is the 99th episode of the NBC sitcom Seinfeld. It was the 13th episode for the sixth season. It aired on January 26, 1995. In this episode, George discovers that he was not trusted with news of a friend's cancer; Jerry discovers that the cancer was faked to milk his sympathy; Elaine gets back at Jake Jarmel by infringing on his jealously guarded glasses; and Kramer accidentally gets between a cop and his pursuit of an elusive parking violator. Jon Lovitz guest stars as Gary Fogel.

== Plot ==
George chides Gary Fogel for not keeping in touch, but is chastened to hear Gary was on chemotherapy. George is dismayed that Jerry had Gary's confidences all along, and kept George in the dark because he cannot put up a poker face.

Jake Jarmel is promoting and signing a new book. Kramer, seeking a new look, wants to get the same glasses as Jake, but Jake will not let anyone copy him.

Calling a drive-by litterer a "pig", Kramer offends a policeman ticketing a car, which speeds off in the confusion. When Kramer explains himself, the policeman blames Kramer for blowing his first chance in sixteen years to nab the car's driver, an unidentified, notorious scofflaw who has evaded untold parking tickets.

Gary makes up to the spurned George by letting him rent a commercial parking space for cheap, and entrusting him with a secret: Gary never had cancer. Gary does not want this getting back to Jerry, but Jerry sees through George's poker face easily and forces him to spill.

Elaine is galled that Kramer told Jake that she "said hi", relinquishing her "upper hand" in their post-breakup standoff. Elaine goes to the signing in a huff to take back the "unauthorized hi", but realizes too late that going to see Jake was an even bigger capitulation.

Jerry is incensed that Gary milked not only months of sympathy but also an unlimited gift certificate for men's hairpieces out of him, but George forces Jerry to keep playing nice so he does not lose the parking space. Jerry swallows his vitriol as Gary shows off a toupée Jerry paid for, then smoothly picks up a woman frequenting Monk's who has always been unapproachable. Kramer copies the policeman's eyepatch as his new look.

George takes out Debby Bibelo in "Jon Voight"'s LeBaron because Gary told him she "said hi", but Debby clarifies that George got the wrong idea because she merely sent her "regards". Seething over Jake's smugness, Elaine spots a passerby with the same glasses. Wanting the glasses herself as revenge, Elaine buys the passerby's pair for expedience since they are from Malaysia. The passerby blindly stumbles into the street, forcing George to swerve and crash.

Kramer sees that the scofflaw is Newman as he flees once again. Confronted, Newman breaks down under the weight of years of guilt and paranoia. Kramer makes him confess to a judge, who orders him to get permanent parking. Since Newman cannot afford a garage, the court requisitions the parking space promised to George.

Impressed by what Gary's toupée did for his confidence, George goes to get his own. Jerry naysays all throughout George's fitting, until the salesman rages at Jerry taking hair for granted. Gary breaks the bad news to George; Jerry, with his hands no longer tied, corners Gary and seizes his toupée. At Monk's, a woman invites the newly toupéed George to sit together.

Jake seethes when Elaine taunts him with the glasses. Mr. Lippman, who is starting a new publisher with Jake, promises Elaine a job, and Elaine gratefully lets him have the glasses. At their joint press conference, Jake turns on Lippman and fights him for the glasses; Elaine resigns herself to Mr. Pitt's employ after all.

== Production ==
Jerry Seinfeld had once heard Keith Richards say "How's your life? All right?", and added it to George's dialogue. Kramer's line "I want to be a pirate," a callback to "The Puffy Shirt", was added to the scene between takes.
