= The Understudy (Seinfeld) =

- Seinfeld episode
- Episode no.: Season 6 Episode 24
- Directed by: Andy Ackerman
- Written by: Marjorie Gross & Carol Leifer
- Production code: 621
- Original air date: May 18, 1995

Guest appearances
- Bette Midler as herself; Jerry Stiller as Frank Costanza; June Kyoto Lu as Ruby; John O'Hurley as Jacopo Peterman; Amy Hill as Kim; Adelaide Miller as Gennice Graham; Alexandra Bokyun Chun as Lotus; Vonnie C. Rhee as Sunny; Craig Thomas as Player #1; Michael McDonald as Player #2; Lou DiMaggio as Stagehand; Jason Beck as Umpire; Bob Shaw as Cabbie; Johnny Silver as Vendor #1; Billy Bastian as Vendor #2

Episode chronology
| ← Previous "The Face Painter" | Next → "The Engagement" |
- Seinfeld season 6

"The Understudy" is the 110th episode of the NBC sitcom Seinfeld. This is the 24th and final episode for the sixth season. It aired on May 18, 1995. This is the second episode in the series not to open with a stand-up routine (after the clip show episode "The Highlights of 100").

== Plot ==
Jerry's girlfriend Gennice weeps copiously first at the tearjerker ending of Beaches, then to mourn a dropped hot dog; unimpressed, Jerry cannot justify moving within arm's reach to console her. The Korean manicurists at Elaine's regular nail salon openly mock her sense of entitlement, but in Korean. Suspicious, but needing a translator, Elaine is pointed to Frank Costanza, who learned Korean as a salesman of Christian idols.

Jerry's comedy club softball team is playing for charity against the cast from the musical adaptation of Rochelle Rochelle, which includes headliner Bette Midler, and Gennice, her understudy. Kramer, starstruck by Midler, volunteers to get her Italian ice. He runs through Manhattan scouring every vendor for the elusive pineapple flavor.

George is fired up by trading trash talk with Midler, and blindly rams into her in a zealous home run sprint cheered on by Jerry. The news reports that Rochelle will premiere with Midler hospitalized. Gennice gratefully assumes Jerry and George sabotaged Midler to advance her own career; Kramer, assuming the same, righteously turns against them all.

Frank confides to Elaine that, in Korea, he had an affair that was self-sabotaged when he refused to take off his shoes while visiting his lover's family. At the salon, the manicurists mock Frank, and he confronts them, getting Elaine thrown out. By chance, Frank's Korean lover also works there; they reunite and elope, but Frank brakes hard and "stops short" to brace her, committing another unforgivable Korean taboo.

Disconsolate, Elaine bumps into a refined man who elegantly recites the specifications of her jacket. He turns out to be the eponymous founder of the J. Peterman catalog. They exchange sophisticated descriptions of apparel, and Elaine gets hired as a copywriter.

Kramer appoints himself as Midler's hospital bedside attendant, and they hit it off. Jerry, George, and Gennice are all publicly vilified, as Jerry finally loses patience with her crying. They go to the hospital to apologize, but Kramer becomes paranoid and abducts Midler.

Elaine invites the manicurists to the Rochelle opening as apology, but they walk out because Midler was substituted. Gennice is notified of her grandmother's death, and Jerry sincerely consoles her only to find her untroubled. On stage, Gennice gives up mid-song in tears when her bootlace comes loose.

Later, Jerry hears Kramer and Midler singing along inside Kramer's apartment.

== Production ==
A stand-up routine was filmed for the intro, but deleted before broadcast because the episode had run so far over the limit for its time slot.

Though it originated with writer Marjorie Gross contemplating what would happen if a celebrity were injured at one of the charity softball games Seinfeld creators Larry David and Jerry Seinfeld participated in, the Bette Midler/Gennice Graham story arc was developed into a parody of the 1994 Tonya Harding-Nancy Kerrigan scandal. Gennice's breakdown when her laces come undone references Harding's bootlace incident at the 1994 Olympics.

Jerry Stiller, who played the part of Frank Costanza, did not actually know any Korean; he learned his Korean lines phonetically. Frank's line "This is not my kind of guy", just as with George's "...we're gonna take it outside and I'm gonna show you what it's like!" from "The Opposite", was taken from a Buddy Rich bootleg tape. Larry David came up with the idea of Frank having a lost love working at the salon.

The character J. Peterman debuted in this episode. The J. Peterman Company catalogue was being delivered to the Seinfeld office, and David and Seinfeld, though they had no idea why the catalogue was being delivered to them, would leaf through it and were amused by the elaborate Hemingwayesque stories that were crafted into the catalogue's descriptions, inspiring them to create the character.
