= The Chaperone (Seinfeld) =

- Seinfeld episode
- Episode no.: Season 6 Episode 1
- Directed by: Andy Ackerman
- Written by: Larry David; Bill Masters; Bob Shaw
- Production code: 601
- Original air date: September 22, 1994

Guest appearances
- Danny Tartabull as himself; Buck Showalter as himself; Gail Strickland as Landis; Ian Abercrombie as Justin Pitt; Marguerite MacIntyre as Karen; Bob Sheppard as himself (Yankee Stadium announcer); Regis Philbin as himself (Miss America pageant announcer) (Note: Uncredited)

Episode chronology
← Previous "The Opposite"	Next → "The Big Salad"
- Seinfeld season 6

"The Chaperone" is the first episode of the sixth season of the American television sitcom Seinfeld, and the 87th episode overall. It first aired on NBC in the United States on September 22, 1994. This is the first episode to be directed by Andy Ackerman. In this episode, Kramer meddles in a Miss America contestant's competition strategy, the New York Yankees wear cotton uniforms on George's advice, and Elaine becomes a fussy socialite's personal assistant.

== Plot ==
During a pregame one-on-one with Danny Tartabull, George finds the polyester, sweat-inducing Yankees uniforms distasteful. Jerry encounters several Miss America contestants attending the game, and chats up Karen, Miss Rhode Island. They go on a date, but Karen has a designated chaperone who cannot make it. Jerry invites Kramer along to fill in.

Elaine interviews to fill Jacqueline Kennedy Onassis's former job at Doubleday, but gets rejected up front as lacking "grace". A socialite friend of Onassis, Justin Pitt, is fascinated by Elaine wearing a scarf and sunglasses ensemble like Onassis, and hires her as his own personal assistant.

Kramer, a lifelong watcher of Miss America pageants, becomes fiercely protective of Karen. He monopolizes the date coaching and micromanaging Karen as an armchair expert, sidelining Jerry entirely. Karen, impressed, takes him on as consultant, and he pledges to take her "to the top". George sells Yankees manager Buck Showalter on cotton uniforms as a competitive advantage; the reoutfitted team plays well, and praises the comfort of cotton.

Jerry goes to Atlantic City for a gig and to meet Karen during the pageant, taking George along. Elaine cannot join them, having to buy socks for Pitt, who proves impossible to shop for. That night, Jerry and George are kept awake by birds cooing below their hotel balcony. Not knowing that they are Karen's trained doves for her magic talent routine, Jerry dumps the hotel ice bucket over the balcony, drowning the doves.

Kramer accuses Jerry of sabotage, and, in defiance, does not let Karen drop out, having her sing instead for the talent competition. Watching the untrained Karen singing "It's a Most Unusual Day" out of tune, Jerry and George flip to the Yankees game, where the team is hamstrung by their uniforms having shrunk in the wash.

== Production ==
Andy Ackerman made his Seinfeld debut with this episode, coming on when the show was already an established success. He recalled being in awe of the show's creators and feeling "like a kid in a candy store." The episode also introduced the character of Justin Pitt, Elaine's new employer. Though he was originally intended as a one-off character, and the episode implies that Elaine will quit or be fired following the end, after production was finished Larry David asked Julia Louis-Dreyfus (the actress playing Elaine) how she felt about Pitt being Elaine's employer for the long term. Writers Tom Gammill and Max Pross planned to use this premise to write scenes in season six where Elaine encounters high society, though this idea ultimately went unused.

The show originated as a script by Bill Masters and Bob Shaw called "The Birds"; Larry David wrote a second draft of the story, which was used as the shooting script.

The locker room scenes were filmed at Angel Stadium in Anaheim, California during late July 1994, when the New York Yankees were actually in town for a series against the then-California Angels. A studio set populated with numerous extras served as Yankee Stadium.

== See also ==
- 2024 Major League Baseball uniform controversy, which references this episode as a precursor to the controversy
