= The Doodle =

- Seinfeld episode
- Episode no.: Season 6 Episode 20
- Directed by: Andy Ackerman
- Written by: Alec Berg & Jeff Schaffer
- Production code: 618
- Original air date: April 6, 1995

Guest appearances
- Wayne Knight as Newman; Barney Martin as Morty Seinfeld; Liz Sheridan as Helen Seinfeld; Len Lesser as Uncle Leo; Billye Ree Wallace as Nana; Christa Miller as Paula; Guy Siner as Mandel; Dana Wheeler-Nicholson as Shelly; Ellis Williams as Exterminator; Coby Turner as Judy; Wayne C. Dvorak as Teacher

Episode chronology
← Previous "The Jimmy"	Next → "The Fusilli Jerry"
- Seinfeld season 6

"The Doodle" is the 106th episode of the NBC sitcom Seinfeld. This is the 20th episode for the sixth season and aired on April 6, 1995. In this episode, Jerry cannot stomach things that were in his girlfriend's mouth, George takes offense that his girlfriend does not care how he looks, Elaine leaves job interview materials in Jerry's apartment being fumigated, and Kramer loses his sense of taste just as delicious peaches are in season.

== Plot ==
At dinner, Jerry accidentally starts eating pecans that his girlfriend Shelly spat out, and his disgusted reaction offends her. George is dating Paula, Elaine's classmate from drawing class. Paula draws a misshapen doodle of George's face; fearing that she really sees him so grotesquely, he makes Elaine ask whether Paula actually likes him.

Elaine gets an interview with Viking Press, which keeps a guest suite at the Plaza Hotel. Elaine pretends to be an out-of-towner so she can use the luxury suite, with expenses paid. However, just as Jerry's parents visit, he finds his apartment infested with fleas and must fumigate. He twists Elaine's arm to yield the suite to his parents, who will only accept frugal accommodations.

As they gossip and titter in class like schoolgirls, Paula confesses to Elaine that she likes George, and that she does not care about his looks. George's relief at this is short-lived since his fear is also confirmed, and he sours on Paula.

Elaine leaves some unopened mail from Viking at Jerry's, but learns that they sent a manuscript to critique for the interview. The apartment is now under fumigation, but Kramer comes out, having disregarded a warning sign and spent over an hour engrossed with the manuscript inside, unknowingly breathing poison gas. Holding her breath, Elaine frantically scrabbles in the darkened apartment for the manuscript, but finds nothing except Chunky Bar wrappers in the couch. Jerry recognizes these as Newman's, and accuses him of bringing fleas over. Newman plays dumb, but Jerry stares him down until he can no longer hide his telltale itching.

With Jerry's reassurance over suite expenses, Morty and Helen let themselves go, inviting Uncle Leo and Jerry's nana over to all pamper themselves ordering room service, massages, and more pay-per-view movies than they can watch. George gives up grooming to spite Paula, but he gets her blessing to dress as shabbily as he wants, or even fulfill his dream of being draped in velvet.

Elaine has no choice but to ask Kramer about the manuscript, but Kramer ends up with more pressing concerns when he loses his sense of taste from the gas. Having ordered a case of much-anticipated Mackinaw peaches—a delicacy only in season two weeks a year—with Newman, Kramer yields the whole case to Newman's glee.

Jerry stays over with Shelly, but forgets his toothbrush; still sore over the pecans, she throws him out when he cannot bring himself to use her toothbrush. George decks himself out in velvet to Paula's approval, and Jerry's horror. He declares that he has found the one for him, but when Paula sucks on his discarded Mackinaw peach pit, he gags in disgust.

Elaine bluffs through her interview by reciting Kramer's cryptic interpretation of the manuscript. However, Elaine gets blamed for flagrantly abusing suite privileges, and loses the job. Kramer regains his sense of taste, but Newman has beaten him to the last of the year's peaches. Kramer exacts revenge by siccing a bulldog on Newman. Back at the suite, Leo confuses Elaine for an escort he hired.

== Production ==
Mackinaw peaches are a rare instance of an outright fantasy element in Seinfeld; both the name and the concept of peaches which are ripe for only two weeks were made up by writers Alec Berg and Jeff Schaffer.

Most of Newman's confession was deleted prior to broadcast. In the full version of the scene, he explains that he got the fleas when he was attacked by Buford, the same dog Kramer sics on him later in the episode, which was why he was so terrified of the small dog.
