= The Couch (Seinfeld) =

- Seinfeld episode
- Episode no.: Season 6 Episode 5
- Directed by: Andy Ackerman
- Written by: Larry David
- Production code: 605
- Original air date: October 27, 1994

Guest appearances
- Reni Santoni as Poppie; David James Elliott as Carl; Robert Hooks as Joe Temple; Denise Dowse as Mother; Patton Oswalt as Clerk; Diana Theodore as Remy Temple; Jessica Hecht as Lindsay; Mari Weiss as Woman #1; Tamar Cooper as Woman #2; Beverly C. Brown as Woman #3; Jeris Poindexter as Man

Episode chronology
| ← Previous "The Chinese Woman" | Next → "The Gymnast" |
- Seinfeld season 6

"The Couch" is the 91st episode of the NBC sitcom Seinfeld. This was the fifth episode for the sixth season. It aired on October 27, 1994. In this episode, Kramer goes into the restaurant business with Poppie, George barges into a stranger's movie night to get out of his book club reading, Jerry makes Elaine confront people on abortion rights, and Poppie leaves a puddle on Jerry's new couch.

== Plot ==
Jerry gets a new couch delivered, and Elaine scores both his old couch and a date with Carl, a hunky furniture mover. Kramer has revived his idea for a pizza parlor where customers do all the cooking, thanks to a partnership with Poppie, whose restaurant has bounced back from the earlier sanitation violations. Kramer and Elaine reprimand Jerry for failing to offer the movers anything to drink.

Kramer sends Jerry and Elaine to try the duck at Poppie's, by special order. Jerry finds out that Elaine is boycotting another restaurant owned by an anti-abortion political donor, and decides to have Elaine confront Poppie's views as well. Bitter over his late mother's forced abortion in a gulag, Poppie is totally opposed, and Jerry's rabble-rousing makes not just Elaine but many other customers walk out. Poppie gets hospitalized over the incident; Jerry and Elaine remorsefully send Poppie a gift basket, but, not knowing his dietary restrictions due to gastrointestinal disease, offend him further.

George needs to read Breakfast at Tiffany's for his girlfriend's book club, but he fails to get even one page in. Jerry suggests he rent the movie instead, but he cannot find a copy anywhere. In desperation, George peeks at video store customer records and tracks down Joe, a total stranger who has a copy out, asking to watch it together.

Elaine falls heads over heels for Carl's straightforward nature, but Jerry reminds her that she does not know his views on abortion. Despite Elaine's wishful thinking, Carl turns out to be an anti-abortion hardliner.

Collecting Jerry's payment for the duck, Poppie sits on Jerry's couch and relieves himself, leaving a puddle that horrifies Jerry. Later, Kramer makes his own pizza using cucumber, but Poppie opposes the "right to choose" pizza toppings freely, and they fall out over the timing of when a pizza begins.

George presumptuously makes himself at home at Joe's, demanding snacks, drinks, and no talking over the movie even when Joe's wife comes home. George spills juice on their couch trying to take back his seat from Joe's daughter.

Jerry gives up his new couch to George and has Carl haul back the old couch. Despite their breakup, Elaine makes sure to offer Carl a drink, but he fails to catch a bottle of juice, which smashes over the old couch. George's knowledge of the movie does not apply to the book, exposing his ruse to his girlfriend.

== Production ==
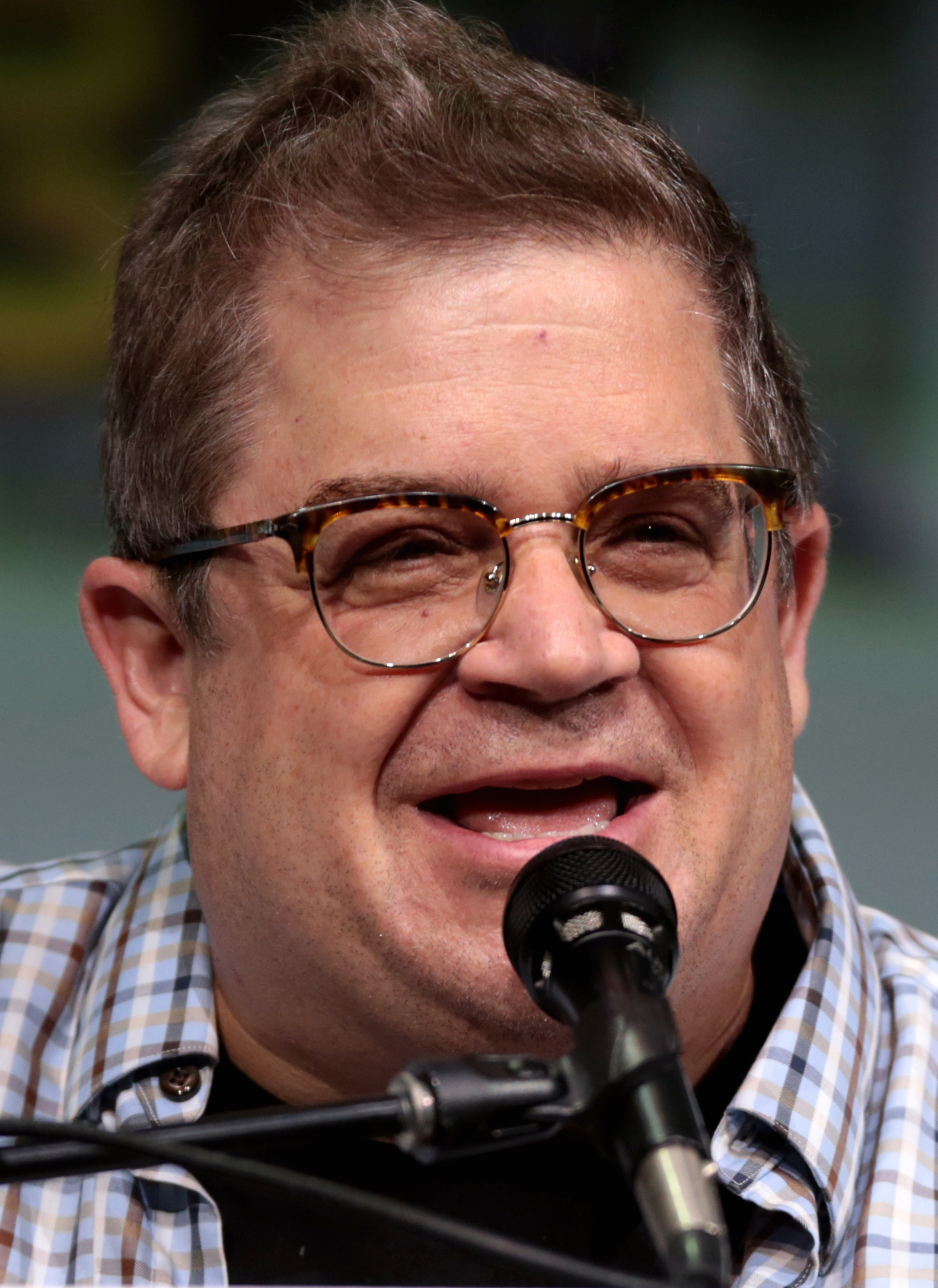
"The Couch" was the TV acting debut of Patton Oswalt.

The opening scene at the furniture store was significantly abridged after filming. Among the cuts was George professing his enthusiasm for velvet; despite being cut before broadcast, this speech is referred back to several times during season six.

The episode is the television debut of Patton Oswalt, who played the video rental clerk.
