= Marjorie Gross =

Canadian TV writer and producer (1956–1996)

- Gross performing on Late Night with David Letterman in 1983
- Born: April 18, 1956; New York City, U.S.
- Died: June 7, 1996 (aged 40); Los Angeles, California, U.S.
- Occupations: Television writer; producer

Marjorie Gross (April 18, 1956 – June 7, 1996) was a Canadian comedian best known for her work as a television writer and producer. She wrote for Seinfeld, Newhart, The Larry Sanders Show, Get a Life and Square Pegs.

== Biography ==
Marjorie Gross was born April 18, 1956, in New York City, while her mother was visiting family in the city. She was raised in Toronto, Ontario. She attended school at Branksome Hall, where she was known as a class clown. She started her career in comedy doing stand-up at local clubs, later moving to New York City. At the age of 19, Gross auditioned for Saturday Night Live during its infamous 1980-1981 season. According to then-writer, Mitchell Kriegman, Gross teamed up with fellow female comedian, Sandra Bernhard, and performed a schtick for then-showrunner, Jean Doumanian. Gross failed to land a role on the show, but became friends with members of the cast, including Dan Aykroyd and Gilda Radner.

One of only a few women stand-up comics in the 1980s, she performed at Catch a Rising Star, the Comic Strip and the Improvisation. In a 1984 The New York Times article about the challenges faced by women comics, Gross questioned the impact of higher-profile women in comedy: "Joan Rivers doesn't change the status quo much.[...] 'Get the ring, the husband, the coat' - for Carson that works. He says, 'Yeah, that's what women should have. Coats, rings. That sits right with me.'"

Gross began writing for television in 1981, when she joined the sitcom Square Pegs. She wrote for numerous other television shows such as Newhart and Alf. Gross worked as a supervising producer on the first season of The Larry Sanders Show, and wrote "Out of the Loop", the 8th episode of the season. She also served as writer and producer on Get a Life starring Chris Elliott. While writing for TV she continued to perform at stand-up clubs and appeared on The David Letterman Show. She also appeared in various theatrical performances including the off-Broadway production The Trojan Woman at Club 57 and the Callboard Theater production of Livin Dolls in Los Angeles.

Gross joined Seinfeld as a writer in 1994. She wrote four episodes: "The Fusilli Jerry", "The Understudy", "The Shower Head" and "The Secretary". Bette Midler was a longtime friend: according to co-writer Carol Leifer, Midler's appearance in The Understudy was secured because of this connection after other big-name actresses declined the role. In 1996, Gross was an Emmy Award nominee for her work on Seinfeld.

== Death ==
Gross died on June 7, 1996, at Cedars-Sinai Medical Center, in Los Angeles at age 40. "The Foundation", Seinfeld's eighth-season premiere, was dedicated to her memory.

Shortly before her death from ovarian cancer, she wrote the article "Cancer Becomes Me", which appeared in the print edition of the April 15, 1996, issue of The New Yorker. She tried to find humor in the situation by joking that she wanted to hold on until November 1996, so that she would not have to risk being re-incarnated as Madonna's child (as Madonna was pregnant).

Gross was the first cousin of Canadian comedian and writer Spencer Rice, who described her as his hero.
