= Fred Stoller =

American comedian (born 1958)

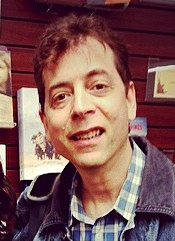
- Stoller in 2012
- Born: March 19, 1958 (age 68); New York City, U.S.
- Occupations: Actor; stand-up comedian; author
- Years active: 1982–present
- Notable work: Everybody Loves Raymond

Comedy career
- Medium: Film; television; stand-up
- Genre: Observational comedy

Fred Stoller (born March 19, 1958) is an American actor, stand-up comedian and author. He is best known for portraying Gerard on Everybody Loves Raymond, the voice of Rusty in the Playhouse Disney series Handy Manny and the voice of Chuck the Evil Sandwich Making Guy in the PBS Kids series, WordGirl.

== Early life ==
Stoller was born in the New York City borough of Brooklyn. He has a sister, Cindy, six years his senior, and is Jewish. Stoller attended Kingsborough Community College before leaving to pursue comedy full time.

== Career ==
Stoller had worked as a stand-up comedian in nightclubs since the early 1980s at the time of his first television appearance, in 1987, when he appeared on Stand-Up America and in 1989 on The Young Comedians Special alongside six other comedians.

He gained recognition for his frequent appearances as Gerard on the CBS sitcom Everybody Loves Raymond, Mr. Lowe in Ned's Declassified School Survival Guide and as Sheldon Singer, the nephew of Harold Gould's deli-owning character, on the short-lived sitcom Singer & Sons (the last show, which ran for four episodes, remains Stoller's only series regular work in his career). He has also made guest appearances on several other TV series. He wrote two episodes of Seinfeld ("The Soup" and the Kramer/chimpanzee subplot of "The Face Painter"). He also appeared as Fred in the episode "The Secret Code".

Stoller is also known as the voices of Chuck the Evil Sandwich Making Guy in WordGirl, Stanley in the Open Season franchise, Rusty the Monkey Wrench on Handy Manny, Fred the Squirrel in The Penguins of Madagascar, Jimbo on Mickey Mouse Mixed-Up Adventures and Steve Tree in Oswald.

In 2025, Stoller recurred on Super Duper Bunny League as the mad scientist Dr. Fuzzleglove who was behind the accident that gave the titular team their superpowers.

== Personal life ==
In 2012, Stoller published a successful e-book titled My Seinfeld Year, in which he chronicled his experiences after being hired as a new staff writer. He has since released a book titled Maybe We'll Have You Back: The Life of a Perennial TV Guest Star, and a second e-book, Five Minutes to Kill: How the HBO Young Comedians Special Changed the Lives of 1989’s Funniest Comics, in 2017.

== Filmography ==
=== Film ===
Year	Title	Role	Notes
1986	Crocodile Dundee		Uncredited role
1989	Big Man on Campus	Student	Direct-to-television film
1994	Dumb and Dumber	Anxious Man at Phone	
1995	Ski Hard	Mel Horner	
1998	Chairman of the Board	Security Guard	
2001	Joe Dirt	Chemistry Teacher	
2002	Austin Powers in Goldmember	Melon Guy	
2005	Rebound	Late Carl	
2006	Little Man	Richard	
2008	Open Season 2	Stanley	Voice
2009	Dr. Dolittle: Million Dollar Mutts	Fluffernufferman	Voice
2010	Open Season 3	Stanley	Voice
2011	The Change-Up	Studio crew member in the Lorno scene	
2013	Paranormal Movie	Father Berkowitz	

=== Television ===
Year	Title	Role	Notes
1991–1996	Murphy Brown	Various roles	6 episodes
1995–1997	Dr. Katz, Professional Therapist	Fred	Voice; 5 episodes
1995	Coach	Mover	Episode: Is It Hot in Here, or Is It Me?:
1995	The Drew Carey Show	Ed	Episode: "The Joining of Two Unlikely Elements Is a Mixture"
1995	Seinfeld	Fred Yerkes	Episode: “The Secret Code”
1996	Wings	Mr. Lutz	Episode: "The Team Player"
1997–1999	The Nanny	Fred the Pharmacist	4 episodes
1997–2000	Science Court	Stenographer Fred	Voice; 18 episodes
1997–2001	Friends	Stuart	2 episodes
1997	Alright Already	Gary	Episode: "Again with the Sexual Harassment"
1997	Cow and Chicken	Lonely Man	Voice; Episode: "Disease Fiesta"
1997	I Am Weasel	Lonely Man	Voice; Episode: "Disease Fiesta"
1997	The Gregory Hines Show	Jack Powers	Episode: "The Boy's Night In"
1998–1999	Sabrina, the Teenage Witch	Warning man; C.K.	2 episodes
1998–2003	Everybody Loves Raymond	Cousin Gerard	8 episodes
2000	The King of Queens	Drive-thru worker	Voice; Episode: "Strike One"
2001–2003	Oswald	Steve Tree	Voice, 20 episodes
2001	Dharma & Greg	Barry	Episode: "Home Is Where The Art Is"
2001–2002	Raising Dad	Bert	3 episodes
2002–2005	Scrubs	Mr. Hoffner	2 episodes
2003–2006	All Grown Up!	Mister Beeker	Voice; 3 episodes
2004–2007	Ned's Declassified School Survival Guide	Mr. Lowe	8 episodes
2005	Monk	Greg	Episode: "Mr. Monk Goes To The Office"
2005	Drake & Josh	Lenny Spodnick	Episode: "Foam Finger"
2006–2013	Handy Manny	Rusty the Monkey Wrench	88 episodes
2007	Veronica Mars	One Hour Photo Clerk	Episode: "Un-American Graffiti"
2007–2015	WordGirl	Chuck the Evil Sandwich Making Guy	43 episodes
2008	Random! Cartoons	Al	Episode: "Call Me Bessie"
2009–2012	The Penguins of Madagascar	Fred the Squirrel	Voice; 13 Episodes
2009	Hannah Montana	Howard Goldwasser	Episode: "You Gotta Lose This Job"
2010–2012	Wizards of Waverly Place	Dexter	8 episodes
2012–2015	Bob's Burgers	Sal	Voice; 2 episodes
2014	Anger Management	Fred	2 episodes
2014	Over the Garden Wall	Fred the Horse	2 episodes
2014	Blood Lake: Attack of the Killer Lampreys	Rich	TV movie
2015–2016	Harvey Beaks	Bartleburt	6 episodes
2017	Bones	Allen Peppermelt	Episode: "The Radioactive Panthers in the Party"
2017	Modern Family	Mister Eckshun	Episode: "Ten Years Later"
2018	Trouble Sleeping	Dr. Gilbert	TV movie
2020	Woody Woodpecker	Peacock	Voice; episode: "Birds of a Feather"
2021	Rick and Morty	Ferkus 9 inhabitant	Voice; episode: "A Rickonvenient Mort"
2022	Raven's Home	Mr. Petracelli	Episode: Mr. Petracelli's Revenge
2022	Oddballs	Foodball Joe	Voice; two episodes
2024	Moon Girl and Devil Dinosaur	Toothgnasher	Voice; episode: "The Devil You Know"
2025	Super Duper Bunny League	Dr. Francis Fuzzleglove	Voice; main role

== Written works by Stoller ==
- My Seinfeld Year (Kindle Single) (2012)
- Maybe We'll Have You Back: The Life of a Perennial TV Guest Star (2013)
- Five Minutes to Kill: How the HBO Young Comedians Special Changed the Lives of 1989's Funniest Comics' (Kindle Single) (2017)

== Sources ==
- Stoller, Fred (2013). Maybe We'll Have You Back: The Life of a Perennial TV Guest Star. New York: Skyhorse. ISBN 978-1-62087-706-7.
