= The Soup (Seinfeld) =

- Seinfeld episode
- Episode no.: Season 6 Episode 7
- Directed by: Andy Ackerman
- Written by: Fred Stoller
- Production code: 608
- Original air date: November 10, 1994

Guest appearances
- Stephen Hytner as Kenny Bania; Tracy Kolis as Kelly; Daniel Gerroll as Simon; Linda Wallem as Hildy; Lawrence Mandley as Manager; Michael Kaplan as Waiter

Episode chronology
← Previous "The Gymnast"	Next → "The Mom & Pop Store"
- Seinfeld season 6

"The Soup" is the 93rd episode of the NBC sitcom Seinfeld. This was the seventh episode of the sixth season. It aired on November 10, 1994.

In this episode, comedian Kenny Bania puts Jerry on the hook to take him to dinner, then decides that ordering only soup does not count. George can no longer eat at Monk's after bungling a date with a waitress, and Elaine brings home a no-good boyfriend from England. Stephen Hytner makes his debut as Bania.

== Plot ==
At Monk's, a waitress banters playfully with George. Elaine returns from England with a boyfriend named Simon, giving him plane tickets that let him stay as long as he wants. Jerry has an unwanted run-in with comedian Kenny Bania, who boasts about bulking up too much to fit his Armani suit, and promises the suit to Jerry without him asking, impressing everyone but Jerry. George is so taken by the waitress that Jerry strong-arms him to go back into Monk's to ask her out. Kramer's kidney stone episode inspires him to give up his refrigerator so that he can only eat food fresh.

Bania brings Jerry his suit with false charity, obliging Jerry to treat him to dinner in return. Simon lands, and immediately takes exception to Elaine's mannerisms. George goes on a walk in Central Park with Kelly, the waitress; he puts a positive spin on the horse manure underfoot, and she immediately mentions that she has a boyfriend. Jerry clues George in that this might have been pretext for being turned off.

Bania picks the restaurant and time for the meal Jerry owes him, but then decides that ordering only soup will keep Jerry on the hook for the meal another time. Jerry protests, to no avail. Later, Elaine tries to settle which soups count as a meal, missing the point that Jerry must keep paying the price of Bania's company. Simon sponges off Elaine and Jerry, and goes out boozing and womanizing.

Back at Monk's, Kelly now treats George gruffly. Bania barges into Jerry's booth, and orders soup and a sandwich; between the two soups, Jerry puts his foot down and declares his debt paid, to Bania's displeasure. Kramer's girlfriend Hildy, a waitress at nearby diner Reggie's, confirms for George that Kelly has no boyfriend.

Elaine looks forward to Simon running out of money and leaving, and Jerry hands off the unwanted Armani to Simon. Kramer, having no food to sate Hildy's hunger and low blood sugar, desperately scavenges Jerry's kitchen at her command. George becomes too self-conscious to patronize Monk's, forcing Jerry and Elaine to eat at Reggie's with him. To their dismay, Reggie's will not make egg white omelets or big salads for them as Monk's does.

George schemes to get Kelly fired, just as Kramer has gotten Hildy fired by calling Reggie's too often. However, George's calls draw Kelly's boss's wrath on himself instead, and he gets banned even as Kelly finishes with her waitress side hustle.

Bania arrives at Monk's to demand his suit back, followed by Simon; the suit has gotten Simon a foot in the door for a job, which could extend his stay indefinitely. Elaine sends Bania after Simon, causing a scuffle that destroys the suit. George dines at Reggie's alone, in silence.

== Production ==
=== Background ===
Episode author Fred Stoller wrote in his book Maybe We'll Have You Back: The Life of a Perennial TV Guest Star that the plot — Jerry repays Kenny not by actually treating him to a meal, any meal, but rather by agreeing that Kenny will set the terms, which keep changing; Kenny orders soup and decides it's not "the meal", thereby setting a new term which might satisfy at "another time;" the lunch sandwich at the diner isn't good enough for the fine dinner he had dreamed of; he plots further terms and other times, until Kenny feels he's getting asymptotically close to the ideal dinner, which is really about having enough hanging-out time with Jerry as he wants — all of this was autobiographical. Like Kenny, Stoller started as a stand-up comic who got booed off stage as often as he won applause; he spent one year among the Seinfeld writing staff and was frightened all that time. "The office culture was built on intimidation and fear. You know your contract won't be renewed when people stop making eye contact with you, or opening their office doors to hear your ideas." Like Jerry, George, and Elaine, Kenny Bania chases unattainable dreams, which lead to a series of comedic misadventures.

=== Filming locations ===
The walk scene in Central Park was filmed at the CBS Radford lagoon, best known as the set for Gilligan's Island.

=== Casting ===
Steven Hytner became the love-to-hate-him lame comedian Bania after trying for other roles on the show. He recalled his audition to Rolling Stone:

I read for three or four different roles before getting Kenny Bania. The character description just said 'the most annoying guy in the world,' and I remember thinking, 'I don't really have a feel for this guy.' I remember hearing other people auditioning, and that's when it hit me: What if he's not annoying for the sake of it, what if he just so desperately wants to be Jerry's friend that he comes off annoying? So I made him an upbeat annoying guy. That seemed to make all the difference in the world. Jerry [Seinfeld] and Larry [David] were in the room and, as soon as I started doing that character, they just exploded in laughter. It was a relief. [...] When we were going to do the taping, it hit me that I was going to do this insanely broad character on the Number One show in the world. You don't want to bomb on the Number One show doing something way too big. Jerry kept saying, 'Please just trust it. It's going to be awesome.' I think that one of my first lines was, 'Yeah, I'm huge!' — and the audience just exploded. I'll always remember Jerry sitting in the booth at the diner and him looking up at me with this look on his eyes like 'I told you so.'"

=== Deleted scenes ===
Sequences which were filmed but deleted prior to broadcast include:

- George giving Kramer advice on asking Hildy out
- George enticing the manager at Reggie's to cater to him, Jerry, and Elaine, as lucrative customers who "never eat at home"
- Hildy breaking up with Kramer over his inability to keep her fed
- Kenny Bania revealing he asked Kelly out as soon as she gave her notice at Monk's, since he wanted to avoid precisely the situation George ended up in in the episode.

== Reception ==
Kenny Bania became an enduringly popular oh-no-it's-HIM-again character in the Seinfeldverse. Rolling Stone placed him at #17 in their list of the "100 Best Seinfeld Characters," close behind the stars and such fan favorites as Newman, David Puddy, Frank Costanza, J. Peterman, and Dr. Tim Whatley. Rolling Stone notes that Bania wants Jerry Seinfeld's approval so badly he'll do anything to gain it, and "also had a knack for putting a positive spin on almost everything. ("The best, Jerry! The best!") But all these traits, including the comedian's litany of jokes about things that dissolve in milk, made Seinfeld loathe him."

The A.V. Club gave this episode a grade of A, with reviewer David Sims expressing the feeling that "after every so-so episode they tend to have a really great one... and in every case it's barely exaggerated but is still hysterically funny — more of a classic, old-school Seinfeld." In this case, the humor comes from an irksome-but-mostly-boring nemesis for Jerry. Sims enjoys taking aim at Kenny Bania, in his first appearance: "Hytner nails the character — he's someone not quite irritating enough for you to openly dislike and ignore," but the viewer forms a definite opinion, because Kenny "takes Jerry hostage by gifting him a suit he doesn't want and Jerry doesn't need and then demanding dinner with him. The stunt he pulls where he goes out to dinner with Jerry and then declines food (except for soup), saying he'll get that dinner from Jerry another time, is quite brazen and wonderfully pathetic [...] I tend to sympathize with Jerry the most when he's being misanthropic, and he's in fine form this episode. Kenny thinks dinner is Jerry treating him; Jerry thinks it's having to suffer through an hour of conversation — be it in a public park or at Buckingham Palace, he only wants to do it once." Sims concludes, "All in all, it's an episode that's the sum of its parts rather than a whole, and it works very well on those grounds."
