= Carol Leifer =

American comedian

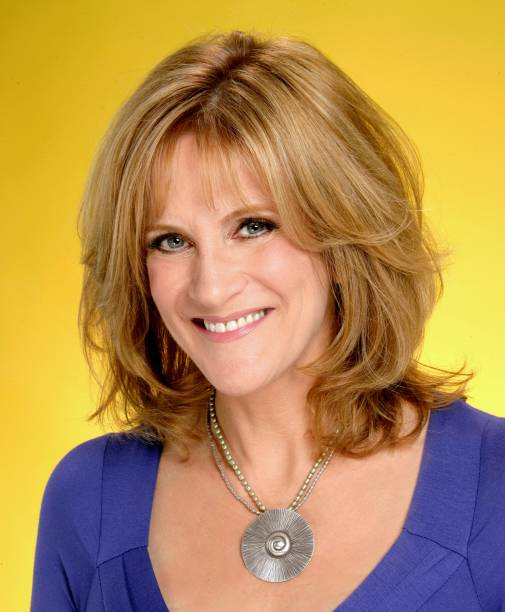
- Leifer in 2009
- Born: 1956 or 1957 (age 69–70); East Williston, New York, U.S.
- Education: Queens College
- Spouses: Ritch Shydner (m. 1981; div. 1987) Lori Wolf (m. 2015)
- Children: 1

Comedy career
- Years active: 1977–present
- Medium: Stand-up comedy; television; film; writing
- Genre: Observational comedy
- Subjects: LGBTQ; Jewish culture; women's issues; everyday life; parenting
- Website: carolleifer.com

Carol Leifer (/ˈliːfər/ LEE-fər; born 1956 or 1957) is an American comedian, writer, and producer whose career as a stand-up comedian started in the 1970s when she was in college. She has written many television scripts including The Larry Sanders Show, Saturday Night Live and Seinfeld.

She has received four Primetime Emmy nominations for The Larry Sanders Show, Seinfeld, the 82nd Academy Awards, and the 84th Academy Awards. Leifer's inner-monologue driven, observational style is often autobiographical, encompassing subjects about her Jewish ancestry and upbringing, coming out, same-sex marriage, relationships, having been married previously to a man and now married to a woman, and parenting.

== Early life ==
Leifer was born and raised in East Williston, New York. As a child, she would frequently put on performances for her family and friends in her family's basement. Leifer recalls her family being a significant part of her fondest memories, including her father's well-known jokes amongst family and friends, as well as her brother taking her to see The Beatles in concert at Shea Stadium. She frequently credits her father as the reason she became a comic.

== Career ==
=== Rise to fame and early career ===
While studying for a theater degree at Harpur College (now Binghamton University), Leifer accompanied her then boyfriend Paul Reiser to a comedy club to see him perform at the open mic night at Catch A Rising Star. In 1977, she began performing stand-up comedy and transferred to Queens College to be closer to the club scene. Later she tried performing at New York's Comic Strip and was introduced by emcee Jerry Seinfeld.

=== Stand-up comedy ===
Leifer's stand-up comedy career has been well received. Early in her career, a critic from Variety wrote a review on one of Leifer's sets, saying, "She still has much to absorb in operating in the comedic area, but, with further experience, has a good chance at the brass ring." The comedians with experience and skill, she became a successful comic.

She has gotten positive feedback over the years and is known for her laughing manner, witty observational comedy, and clean-cut humor. Leifer credits mentor and lifelong friend, David Letterman, with her rise to fame, having performed stand-up comedy on Late Night with David Letterman 25 times. Leifer also appeared on The Tonight Show Starring Johnny Carson, Dr. Katz, Politically Incorrect, Hollywood Squares, Late Night with Conan O'Brien and The Tonight Show with Jay Leno. Her stand-up experience also includes opening for Jerry Seinfeld and Frank Sinatra.

Leifer has also performed and released several stand-up specials. Her stand-up specials, listed chronologically, are:

- The 8th Annual Young Comedians Show (1983)
- Rodney Dangerfield: Nothin' Goes Right (1987)
- Carol Doesn't Leifer Anymore (1988)
- Carol Leifer Comedy Cruise (1989)
- Carol Leifer: Really Big Shoo! (1990)
- Caroline's Comedy Hour (1990)
- London Underground (1991)
- Comedy Central Presents Carol Leifer (2003)
- More Funny Women of a Certain Age (2020)

=== Writing ===
Leifer's writing career spans several well-known shows, including Seinfeld, Saturday Night Live, It's Like, You Know... and The Larry Sanders Show. She has written for the Academy Awards for most of the 21st century, as well as the 69th Annual Tony Awards.

Leifer started her comedy writing career at Saturday Night Live. Leifer was hired by Al Franken and Jim Downey to work as a writer for the popular sketch comedy show. Executive producer, Lorne Michaels did not hire Leifer directly, and that became clear. Leifer recalls her time at SNL being a great opportunity to grow and learn as a writer, but the division caused by Michaels' indifference impacted her time working there, as she recalls "it felt like being asked to play on a Beatles album by Ringo." Leifer was not asked to return to the staff for a second season.

Leifer starred in, created and executive-produced the 1997 WB sitcom Alright Already, which only ran one season. The series focused on single optometrist Carol Lerner (played by Leifer), who runs her own practice in Miami, Florida while dealing with family, friends and romance. The show received mixed reviews, saying it lacked an endearing plot and Leifer "squeezed uncomfortably into an uncomfortable sitcom."

With Mitchell Hurwitz, Leifer created and was a writer for The Ellen Show (2001). The series was negatively received and only ran one season. Leifer has also written for several television shows, such as Devious Maids, Modern Family and Rules of Engagement. Leifer's writing credits are listed below:

Writing credits
| Year | Program | Network | Notes | ref |
|---|---|---|---|---|
| 1985–1986 | Saturday Night Live | NBC | 18 episodes | |
| 1988 | Nothin' Goes Right | HBO | TV Special; Uncredited | |
| 1992 | Carol Leifer: Gaudy, Bawdy & Blue | Showtime | TV movie; Also starred as Rusty Berman | |
| 1995 | Dr. Katz, Professional Therapist | Comedy Central | Episode: "Office Management"; Additional material | |
| 1993–1996 | Seinfeld | NBC | 6 episodes Other credits include coproducer, story editor and executive story editor Some episodes were co-written with Peter Mehlman and Marjorie Gross | |
| 1996 | The 48th Primetime Emmy Awards | CBS | Other writers included Barry Adelman, Jon Macks, Kevin Rooney and Bruce Vilanch | |
| 1997 | The Larry Sanders Show | HBO | Episode: "The Prank"; co-written with Lester Lewis | |
| 1997 | The Naked Truth | NBC | Episode: "The Birds" | |
| 1997 | Almost Perfect | CBS | 2 episodes: "Gimme Shelter" and "Datings for Ratings" | |
| 1997–1998 | Alright, Already | The WB | 2 episodes: "Again with the Black Box" and "Again with the Billionaire"; Other credits include creator; Also starred as Carol Lerner | |
| 1999 | It's Like, You Know... | ABC | Episode: "Twins" | |
| 2000 | 72nd Academy Awards | ABC | Co-wrote with Bruce Vilanch, Jonathan Tolins, David Steinberg, Marc Shaiman, Jeffrey Ross, Billy Martin, Jon Macks, Ed Driscoll, Billy Crystal, Rita Cash and Dave Boone | |
| 2002 | 74th Academy Awards | ABC | Co-wrote with Bruce Vilanch, Dave Boone, Whoopi Goldberg, Chris Henchy, Jon Macks, Chuck Martin, Rita Rudner, Wanda Sykes and Jonathan Tolins | |
| 2001–2002 | The Ellen Show | CBS | 5 episodes; Other credits include co-creator. | |
| 2003 | 55th Primetime Emmy Awards | CBS | | |
| 2003 | I'm With Her | | Episode: "The Second Date" | |
| 2004 | The 76th Academy Awards | ABC | Co-wrote with Scott Wittman, Norman Steinberg, David Steinberg, Marc Shaiman, Billy Martin, Ed Driscoll, Dave Boone, Beth Armogida and Jon Macks | |
| 2004 | The Soluna Project | N/A | Movie; co-written with Jacque Edmonds | |
| 2005 | The 77th Academy Awards | ABC | Listed as "Special Material Writer" | |
| 2007 | The 79th Academy Awards | ABC | Co-wrote with Bruce Vilanch, Dave Boone, William Coronel and Jon Macks | |
| 2007 | Rules of Engagement | CBS | Episode: "A Visit From Fay" | |
| 2010 | The 82nd Academy Awards | ABC | Co-wrote with Bruce Vilanch, Jeffrey Richman and Jon Macks | |
| 2011 | Modern Family | ABC | Episode: "Two Monkeys and a Panda" co-written with Elaine Ko | |
| 2011 | The 63rd Primetime Emmy Awards | CBS | Listed as writing "host material" | |
| 2012 | The 84th Academy Awards | ABC | Other writers included Dave Boone and Jon Macks | |
| 2014 | Devious Maids | Lifetime | 2 episodes: "You Can't Take it With You" and "Crimes of the Heart" | |
| 2015 | 69th Annual Tony Awards | CBS | Listed as "Special Material Writer" | |
| 2016 | MADtv | The CW | 8 episodes | |
| 2016 | Writer's Block | N/A | Short Film | |
| 2017 | The Carol Burnett 50th Anniversary Special | CBS | TV special; Co-wrote with Carol Burnett, Buz Kohan, Jon Macks and Pasquale Murena | |
| 2016–2018 | Better Late Than Never | NBC | 12 episodes | |
| 2018 | The 90th Academy Awards | ABC | Other writers include Jon Macks | |
| 2018 | A Little Help with Carol Burnett | Netflix | 12 episodes | |
| 2018 | Mark Twain Prize for American Humor: Julia Louis-Dreyfus | PBS | Co-wrote with Paul Greenberg, Jon Macks, Sara Schaefer and Jeff Stilson | |
| 2019 | The 91st Academy Awards | ABC | Listed as "Special Material Writer" | |
| 2020 | Curb Your Enthusiasm | HBO | Episode: "Artificial Fruit" | |
| 2020–2021 | B Positive | CBS | 6 episodes "Story editor" for 2 episodes: "High Risk Factor" and "Miss Diagnosis" | |

=== Seinfeld ===
Carol Leifer joined the Seinfeld writing staff during its fifth season (1993–94), and wrote six episodes for the show between then and its seventh season (1995–96). Alongside being a writer on the show, Leifer was a story editor for 16 episodes from 1993 to 1994 and an executive story editor for 23 episodes from 1994 to 1995. She has been dubbed "the real Elaine", as the series' character, Elaine Benes, was partially based on her. The episodes Leifer wrote, listed chronologically, are:

Seinfeld Episodes
| Season | Episode | Notes |
|---|---|---|
| Season 5 | "The Lip Reader" | |
| Season 5 | "The Hamptons" | co-written with Peter Mehlman |
| Season 6 | "The Secretary" | co-written with Marjorie Gross |
| Season 6 | "The Beard" | |
| Season 6 | The Understudy | co-written with Marjorie Gross |
| Season 7 | "The Rye" | |

Her work on Seinfeld garnered her a Primetime Emmy Award nomination. Leifer recalls when looking for writers for the show, Larry David, co-creator of Seinfeld, specifically wanted writers who had never written for sitcoms before. Working as a writer for Seinfeld is one of Leifer's favorite credits because of the incredible experiences it gave her as well as the opportunity to work alongside incredible comedians. Leifer speaks highly of her coworkers while working on the show, remembering Jerry Seinfeld as "the hardest working of all the comedians I came up with." One of the most important things she learned as a writer from working on Seinfeld was to "mine your own life for comedy ideas." Leifer's comedy frequently stems from herself and her family, proving what she learned from working on Seinfeld has had a lasting impact on her work.

=== Acting and appearances ===
Leifer appeared as a receptionist on The Golden Palace in 1992, and appeared as a contestant on the third season of Celebrity Apprentice. Leifer chose North Shore Animal League as her charity because of her and her wife's work for animal advocacy. She was the first to be eliminated, on the premiere episode, which aired on March 14, 2010.

She has also hosted for all four seasons of A&E's Caroline's Comedy Hour, as well as guest appearances on Talk Soup and Later. She was also a guest on Inside Comedy where she was interviewed by David Steinberg.

Leifer wrote and starred in the 1992 Showtime TV film Carol Leifer: Gaudy, Bawdy & Blue, a mockumentary about fictional aged comedian Rusty Berman (played by Leifer), told through interviews and flashbacks. The film had a similar concept to the film Mr. Saturday Night, which had come out several months earlier. She was also part of Superman's 50th Anniversary: A Celebration of the Man of Steel as Beth Lewis, Lois Lane's best friend.

Leifer has also had minor acting and voice-over roles in movies such as Bee Movie, Rules of Engagement, Dr. Katz, Professional Therapist, Medusa: Dare to Be Truthful and Desperately Seeking Susan.

=== Books ===
Carol Leifer has written two books. Her first book of humorous essays, entitled When You Lie About Your Age, The Terrorists Win, was released on March 10, 2009. Leifer discusses her early life and family, the daunting idea of getting older, outlooks on life, and the moment she discovered she might be gay and how her life changed for the better. Her second book, How to Succeed in Business Without Really Crying was published in 2014. Considered a "part memoir, part guide to life", Leifer tells the public her journey as a comic and entertainer. She gives tips and guides for working in the entertainment industry. Leifer also talks about her personal work experiences, such as her time writing for Saturday Night Live, working with Jerry Seinfeld, and her career as a stand-up comic

== Accolades ==
- Frank Sinatra praised Leifer as "one funny broad!" and "I wish my mother had been that funny—I wouldn't have had to work so hard."
- In 1998, Leifer was named by The New York Times as "the only comic among six 'fast-rising artists...to watch' this season"
- Leifer was nominated for the second annual American Comedy Awards as "Funniest Female Comedy Club Stand-Up Comic."

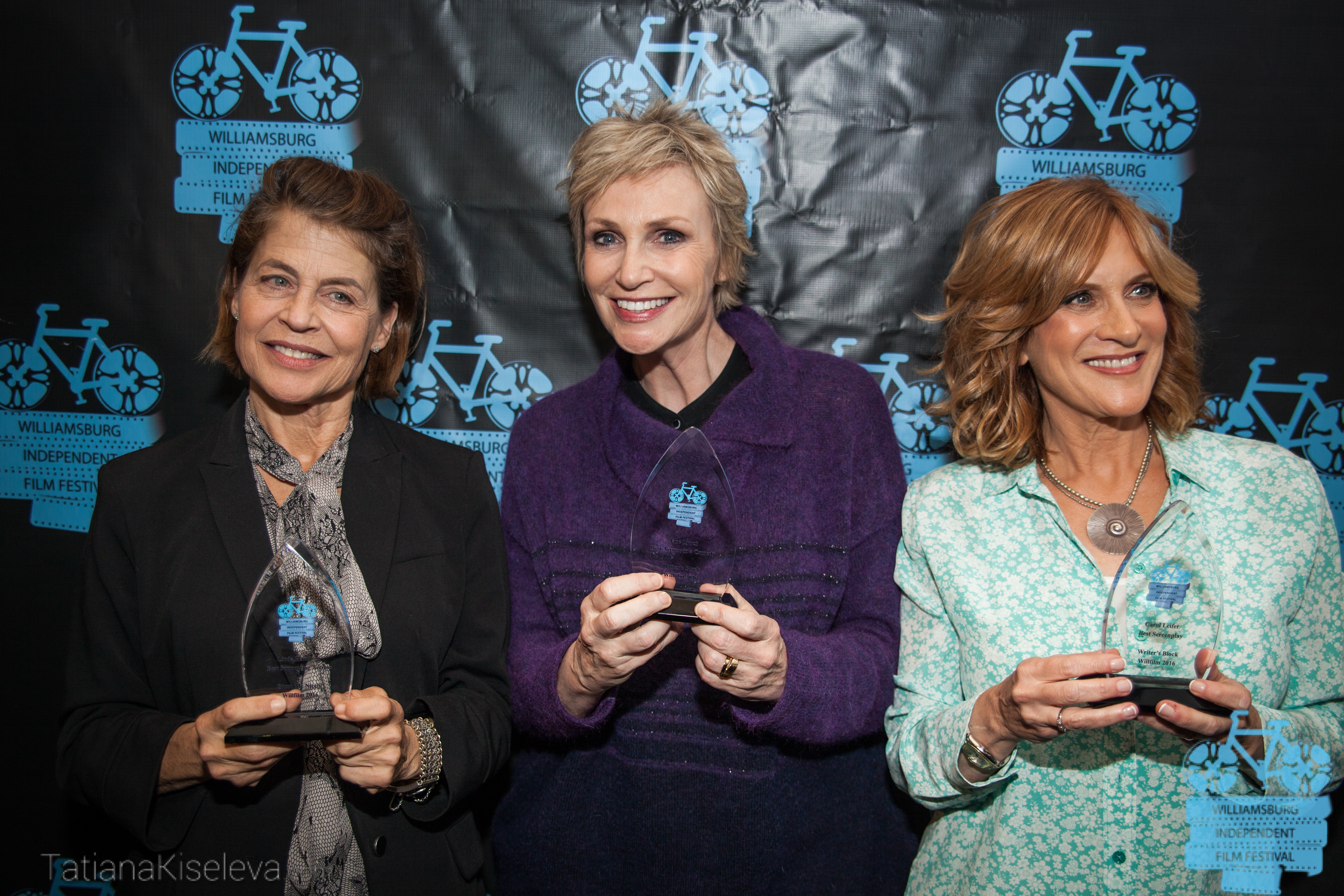
(Left to right) Linda Hamilton, Jane Lynch and Carol Leifer with their 2016 Williamsburg Independent Film Festival awards. Leifer and Lynch won for their short film Writer's Block and Hamilton won for Shoot me Nicely.

Awards and Nominations
| Year | Award | Category | Work | Result |
|---|---|---|---|---|
| 1996 | Primetime Emmy Awards | Outstanding Comedy Series | Seinfeld | Nominated |
| 1997 | Primetime Emmy Awards | Outstanding Comedy Series | The Larry Sanders Show | Nominated |
| 2010 | Primetime Emmy Awards | Outstanding Writing for a Variety, Music or Comedy Special | 82nd Academy Awards | Nominated |
| 2012 | Primetime Emmy Awards | Outstanding Writing for a Variety Special | 84th Academy Awards | Nominated |
| 1994 | CableACE Awards | Best Comedy Special | Carol Leifer: Gaudy, Bawdy & Blue | Nominated |
| 1994 | CableACE Awards | Best Performance in a Comedy Special | Carol Leifer: Gaudy, Bawdy & Blue | Nominated |
| 2018 | Legionnaires of Laughter Legacy Awards | Best Children's Comedy Writer | A Little Help With Carol Burnett | Nominated |
| 2012 | Online Film & Television Association | Best Writing in a Comedy Series | Modern Family | Nominated |
| 2016 | Williamsburg Independent Film Festival, US | Best Screenplay | Writer's Block | Won |
| 2016 | Williamsburg Independent Film Festival, US | Best Narrative Short Film | Writer's Block | Won |
| 2015 | Women's Image Network Awards | Outstanding Show Produced by a Woman | Devious Maids | Nominated |
| 2021 | Writers Guild of America Awards | Best Comedy Series | Curb Your Enthusiasm | Nominated |
| 2019 | Writers Guild of America Awards | Best Comedy/Variety Specials | 90th Academy Awards | Nominated |
| 2016 | Writers Guild of America Awards | Best Comedy/Variety (Music, Awards, Tributes) Specials | 69th Tony Awards | Nominated |
| 2012 | Writers Guild of America Awards | Best Comedy Series | Modern Family | Won |
| 1995 | Writers Guild of America Awards | Best Episodic Comedy | Seinfeld | Nominated |

== Personal life ==
In 1981, Leifer married comic Ritch Shydner, who, due to not being Jewish, was problematic for Leifer's father. They divorced in 1987 and have remained friends. Leifer also briefly dated Jerry Seinfeld before working with him on Seinfeld. Elaine Benes is inspired by her. Leifer and Seinfeld dated less than a year and have remained close friends, with Leifer having only positive things to say about him.

Though she had relationships with men and had been married to a man in the past, Carol Leifer is a lesbian. After her divorce from Ritch Shydner, Leifer wanted to explore her sexuality. At age 40, Leifer met her current wife, Lori Wolf, and realized she was gay, not "just looking for a fling" as she originally intended. When coming out, Leifer's family and friends were very supportive, especially her parents. She recalls her father being happy that Lori Wolf was Jewish.

When Leifer came out, her comedy and material changed to fit her life, often making jokes about coming out so late in her life and humor based on her and Wolf's relationship. Leifer has faced some negative reception due to her sexuality. After receiving a homophobic letter, Leifer recalls feeling "I thought I was prepared for something like that, but even 13 years in, it's still a kick in the face."

In 1996, Leifer met Lori Wolf, a real estate executive, when they shared a table at a Project Angel Food charity dinner in Los Angeles. Leifer was immediately interested and later contacted Wolf through the host of their table, though Wolf initially rebuffed Leifer's overtures because Wolf was in a relationship at the time. Wolf contacted Leifer weeks later, after she had ended her relationship, and began one with Leifer.

They moved in together in 2005, and, in acclimating herself to Wolf's pets, Leifer became an animal rights activist. That year, Leifer proposed to Wolf over dinner at the Palm Restaurant in Beverly Hills. They were married in Los Angeles in 2015. In attendance were Jane Lynch, Larry David, Bill Maher, Garry Shandling, Henry Winkler, Larry Miller, Jay Leno and Paul Reiser. They have an adopted son.

In 2007 they purchased a $3.2 million, 5,000-square-foot (460 m^{2}) home in the Santa Monica Hills, as part of their preparations to adopt their nine-month-old son, Bruno Leifer-Wolf, who was born in Guatemala in 2006. Leifer was 50 years old at the time, which she felt was the best age for her to have a child, saying "I feel I have a better outlook on life."

Leifer has become vegan, joking "I recently became vegan because I felt that as a Jewish lesbian, I wasn't part of a small enough minority. So now I'm a Jewish lesbian vegan." Leifer has been an advocate for animal rights and made testimonials for PETA about her decision to become vegan, encouraging others to do the same.
