= The Mom & Pop Store =

- Seinfeld episode
- Episode no.: Season 6 Episode 8
- Directed by: Andy Ackerman
- Written by: Tom Gammill & Max Pross
- Production code: 607
- Original air date: November 17, 1994

Guest appearances
- Jon Voight as himself; Bryan Cranston as Tim Whatley, D.D.S.; Ian Abercrombie as Mr. Pitt; Elsa Raven as Mom; Tom Wright as Morgan; Dan Frischman as "Guy on Phone"; Rick Fitts as Dentist; Mike Robelo as Pop; Ken Thorley as Car Salesman; Pat Asanti as Electrician; Nancy Balbirer as Woman at Party

Episode chronology
← Previous "The Soup"	Next → "The Secretary"
- Seinfeld season 6

"The Mom & Pop Store" is the 94th episode of the NBC sitcom Seinfeld. This was the eighth episode for the sixth season. It aired on November 17, 1994. In this episode, George boasts that he bought Jon Voight's car; Kramer supports a mom and pop shoe repair shop at Jerry's expense; Jerry must second-guess whether he is invited to his dentist's party; and Elaine wins a radio contest for Mr. Pitt. Bryan Cranston debuts as dentist Tim Whatley, and Voight cameos as himself.

== Plot ==
Elaine is thrilled to be invited to Jerry's dentist Tim Whatley's "night before Thanksgiving" party—overlooking all the Macy's Thanksgiving Day Parade balloons being inflated—and hopes he will ask her out too. George impulsively buys a LeBaron convertible—boasting that the salesman said it belonged to Jon Voight—rather than a Volvo as planned.

Kramer demands that Jerry support a mom and pop shoe repair store on the verge of closure. Kramer takes all of Jerry's sneakers in for detailing, then lies down to stop a nosebleed. He warns the elderly proprietors to call an electrician for exposed ceiling wiring.

A big band radio station is running a song identification contest, where winners get to hold the tethers of the Woody Woodpecker parade balloon. Elaine happens to know all her father's big band records by heart. Mr. Pitt beseeches Elaine to win him a spot, to make up for his repressed childhood.

Jerry is left with no spare shoes except a pair of cowboy boots, which he only unwillingly accepted as payment for a gig. Riding in the LeBaron, Jerry finds a chewed pencil and a manual with the name "John Voight". Jerry mocks George for getting suckered by a soundalike name, and gets thrown out next to some hoodlums. Trying to flee in the boots, Jerry falls down.

The electrician holds the proprietors liable to get their wiring up to code; unable to afford this, they close up shop, absconding with Jerry's sneakers. George, still in denial, fails to convince the Yankees to commemorate Voight as an excuse to ask about the car. Kramer spots Voight in the flesh, but Voight fends him off by biting his arm. While receiving Mr. Pitt's prize and a trophy, Elaine is forced to sit next to a deafening live big band.

Jerry realizes that he helped Whatley send invitations, but never got one himself. No longer sure if he was invited, Jerry still needs to find a dentist at the party for his swelling jaw before the holiday weekend. George and Kramer also want a dentist to match Kramer's bitten arm against the pencil. No one will risk going with Jerry, in case he was not invited.

At the party, Whatley asks Elaine out for New Year's Eve, but, still deafened, she uncomprehendingly shakes her head. Whatley chews George's pencil, ruining the bite marks, but confirms that periodontist John Voight was the LeBaron's former owner. Leaning back to get his jaw checked, Jerry knocks Elaine's pointy trophy out a window, popping the Woody Woodpecker balloon below. Whatley calls out Jerry as an uninvited guest. The next day, Mr. Pitt is caught under the collapsing balloon on parade.

Jerry gets tipped off that his sneakers are at a garage sale in Parsippany, New Jersey. Jerry and Kramer take a bus out, but Kramer starts to fade from his nosebleed, paying homage to Dustin Hoffman's death scene alongside Voight in Midnight Cowboy.

== Production ==
As with many Seinfeld episodes, "The Mom & Pop Store" was inspired by events in the lives of the writers. Writer Tom Gammill bragged to Jerry Seinfeld that he had purchased a car which was previously owned by Jon Voight; his writing partner Max Pross broke in that he was skeptical that the car had really belonged to Voight. Seinfeld suggested the two of them turn their argument into an episode. According to Gammill and Pross, much of the conversations between George and Jerry were "almost verbatim" recreations of their real debate over the car, including Jerry (Pross in real life) noticing that the owner's manual said "John Voight", though the pencil with teeth marks is fictional.

Jon Voight was on the set for just a few minutes to film his scene. During this time, Gammill asked Voight to look at the car, and Voight said he had never owned it. The same car, including the keys, was used as George's car in both this episode and Season 7's "The Gum." Pross' car has a cameo as the car George originally planned to buy.

The big band songs heard on the radio in the episode, "Honeysuckle Jump" and "Next Stop, Pottersville", are not really from the big band era; they were composed by Jonathan Wolff specifically for this episode. In the Dixieland Deli, another contestant mentions to Elaine that he guessed the name of another (fictional) song, credited to 'Stan Herman', which is a portmanteau of real-life bandleaders Stan Kenton and Woody Herman.

The character Tim Whatley was introduced for this episode. Gammill and Pross based him on a college acquaintance who would specifically not invite certain people in the same circle of friends to his parties.

The sequence with the Woody Woodpecker balloon was inspired by footage of a Woody Woodpecker balloon explosively collapsing during a parade. The production team were unable to obtain the rights to this footage, so they had to recreate it using just a brief shot of Mr. Pitt trying to hold up the balloon.
