= Tom Gammill and Max Pross =

American comedy writing team

Tom Gammill
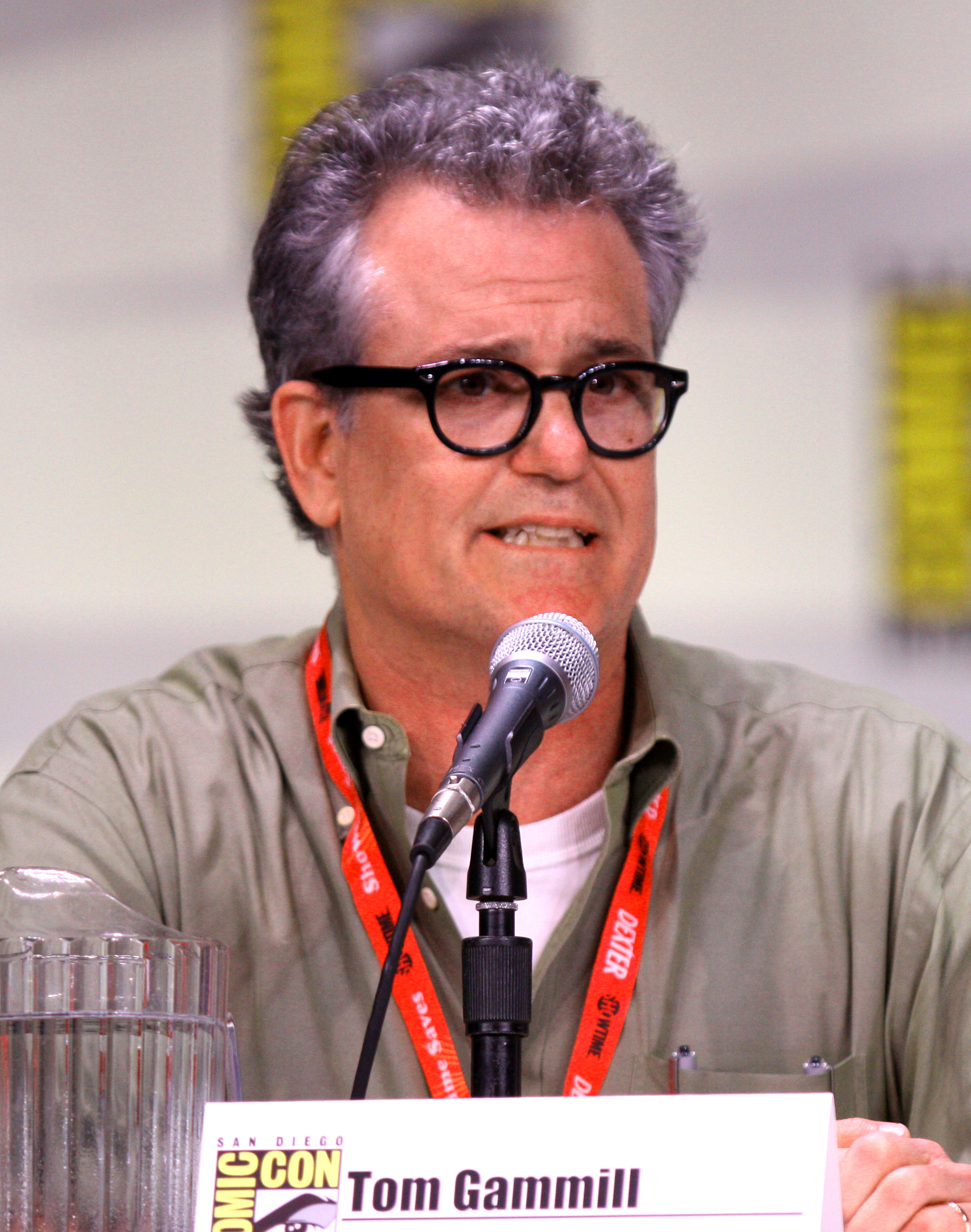
- Gammill in 2011
- Born: 1957 (age 68–69); Darien, Connecticut, U.S.
- Education: Harvard University
- Occupation: Television writer
- Years active: 1979–present

Max Pross
- Born: 1957 (age 68–69)
- Education: Harvard University
- Occupation: Television writer
- Years active: 1979–present

Tom Gammill and Max Pross (born 1957) are an American comedy writing team. Together they have written episodes for the TV shows Seinfeld, The Critic, The Wonder Years, It's Garry Shandling's Show, and Monk. They have also worked as producers on The Simpsons and Futurama.

== Early life ==
Gammill was born in Darien, Connecticut, and graduated from Darien High School in 1975. He entered Harvard University, where he met Pross while writing for The Harvard Lampoon, and the pair became roommates and writing partners. They graduated from Harvard in 1979.

== Career ==
=== Early years ===
Pross and Gammill started to write comedy sketches together for Saturday Night Live in 1979.

In 1981 Pross and Gammill co-wrote Steve Martin's fourth NBC special, Steve Martin's Best Show Ever, with such notable comedy writers as Eric Idle, Dan Aykroyd, and Lorne Michaels. The duo spent the next few years as part of the original writing staff of Late Night with David Letterman. After leaving the staff, they contributed short films to the show.

In 1984 Pross and Gammill worked on the writing staff of another Lorne Michaels production, The New Show, a comedy sketch show which was similar to Saturday Night Live but not successful. It ran for less than one season. Guests included Steve Martin and John Candy.

In 1987 Pross and Gammill joined the writing staff on It's Garry Shandling's Show, and in 1989 they wrote an episode for The Wonder Years called "Math Class". They were both listed as contributors to the short-lived zine Army Man in 1989.

In 1992, the duo created and produced the Fox series Great Scott! starring Tobey Maguire and Kevin Connolly.

=== Seinfeld ===
Tom Gammill and Max Pross joined the Seinfeld writing team during the show's fifth season (1993–1994). They left the show after the seventh season (1995–1996), but took advantage of a loophole in their post-Seinfeld writing contract to script one further episode for the eighth season. On the Seinfeld DVDs, Jerry Seinfeld credits the pair with bringing a "buoyancy" to the writing staff that aided the development of fresh ideas during the show's middle years. Seinfeld mentioned that he and co-creator Larry David were initially worried about Gammill and Pross' writing style, as the pair created stories that were a "level of silliness" that the show had never gone to before. Ultimately the worry was unfounded, as the pair ended up writing some of the most famous Seinfeld shows during the series' run. The episodes they wrote were:

- Season 5
  - "The Glasses"
  - "The Cigar Store Indian"
  - "The Pie"
  - "The Raincoats, Part 1" with Jerry Seinfeld and Larry David
  - "The Raincoats, Part 2" with Jerry Seinfeld and Larry David
- Season 6
  - "The Pledge Drive"
  - "The Mom & Pop Store"
  - "The Race" with Larry David
  - "The Doorman"
  - "The Diplomat's Club"
- Season 7
  - "The Wink"
  - "The Gum"
  - "The Doll"
- Season 8
  - "The Checks" with Steve O'Donnell

=== The Critic ===
Tom Gammill and Max Pross wrote "Marty's First Date", an episode of The Critic in which Marty invites his dad Jay to career day at his school where Marty develops a crush on a Cuban girl, Carmen. They go on a date, but when Carmen decides to fly back to Cuba, Marty follows her, and Jay must get his son back. It was the second episode of season 1 and aired on February 2, 1994.

=== The Simpsons ===
Gammill and Pross have been producers on The Simpsons since 1999, they started as consulting producers then they got promoted to producers in 2001. They won an Emmy Award for Outstanding Animated Program in 2001 for the episode "HOMR". For season 24 Tom Gammill and Max Pross wrote the episode: "Hardly Kirk-ing", which was nominated for a WGA Award. For season 28, they also wrote the episode: "Monty Burns' Fleeing Circus". For Season 29, they wrote the episodes: "Whistler's Father", "The Old Blue Mayor She Ain't What She Used to Be" and "3 Scenes Plus a Tag from a Marriage" and for season 31, they wrote the episode: "The Incredible Lightness of Being a Baby".

=== Film ===
Gammill and Pross worked as uncredited writers on Son of the Mask, the Raspberry Award-winning 2005 sequel to the 1994 comedy film The Mask. They are also given story credits on the 2007 comedy Full of It, in which a teenage boy is forced to live out the lies he had told in order to become popular. Dialogue in Ghostbusters II refers to a "Gammill and Pross Infant Acuity Test" though their contribution to the film is unknown.
