= Michael Richards =

American actor and comedian (born 1949)

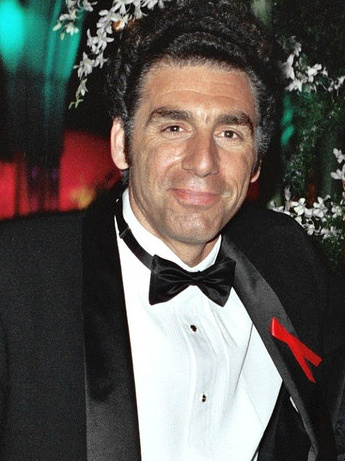
- Richards in 1993
- Born: Michael Anthony Richards; July 24, 1949 (age 77); Culver City, California, U.S.
- Education: Los Angeles Valley College; California Institute of the Arts; The Evergreen State College (BA)
- Occupations: Actor; comedian
- Years active: 1979–2019
- Spouses: Cathleen Lyons (m. 1974; div. 1993); Beth Skipp (m. 2010)
- Children: 2
- Military career
- Allegiance: United States
- Branch: U.S. Army
- Service years: 1970–1972

Michael Anthony Richards (born July 24, 1949) is an American actor and comedian. He achieved global recognition for starring as Cosmo Kramer on the NBC television sitcom Seinfeld from 1989 to 1998. He began his career as a stand-up comedian, first entering the national spotlight when he was featured on Billy Crystal's first cable TV special, and went on to become a series regular on ABC's Fridays.

From 1989 to 1998, he played Cosmo Kramer on Seinfeld, three times receiving the Primetime Emmy Award for Outstanding Supporting Actor in a Comedy Series. During the run of Seinfeld, he made a guest appearance in Mad About You, reprising his role as Kramer. Richards also made numerous guest appearances on a variety of television shows, such as Cheers. His film credits include So I Married an Axe Murderer, Airheads, Young Doctors in Love, Problem Child, Coneheads, UHF, and Trial and Error, one of his few starring roles. In 2000, he starred in his own sitcom, The Michael Richards Show, which was canceled after only two months.

In 2006, Richards was filmed going on a racist tirade against hecklers while performing at the Laugh Factory in California. After the tape was obtained and released by TMZ, significant backlash and media coverage led to Richards retiring from stand-up in early 2007. In 2009, he appeared as himself in the seventh season of Curb Your Enthusiasm alongside his fellow Seinfeld cast members for the first time since the show’s finale. In 2013, he portrayed Frank in the sitcom Kirstie, which was canceled after one season. He most recently played Daddy Hogwood in the 2019 romantic comedy Faith, Hope & Love.

== Early life ==
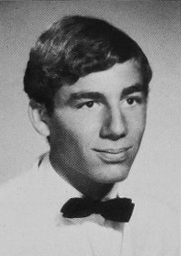
Richards as a senior at Thousand Oaks High School in Thousand Oaks, California (1967)

Richards was born in Culver City, California, to a Catholic family. He is the son of Phyllis (née Nardozzi), a medical records librarian. As a child, Richards was told his father was William Richards, an electrical engineer, who died in a car crash when Michael was two. He later learned his mother's pregnancy was the result of a sexual assault and that she considered abortion and adoption before deciding to raise him as a single mother. Richards was also raised by a grandmother who suffered from schizophrenia.

Richards graduated from Thousand Oaks High School. In 1968, he appeared as a contestant on The Dating Game but was not chosen for a date. He was drafted into the United States Army in 1970. He trained as a medic and was stationed in West Germany, where he was a member of a theatrical group called The Training Road Show. He became interested in performing after taking a theatrical class in seventh grade.

After being honorably discharged, Richards used the benefits of the G.I. Bill to enroll in the California Institute of the Arts and earned a Bachelor of Arts in drama from the Evergreen State College in 1975. He also had a short-lived improv act with Ed Begley Jr. During this period, he enrolled at Los Angeles Valley College and continued to appear in student productions.

== Career ==
=== 1979–1989: Early career ===
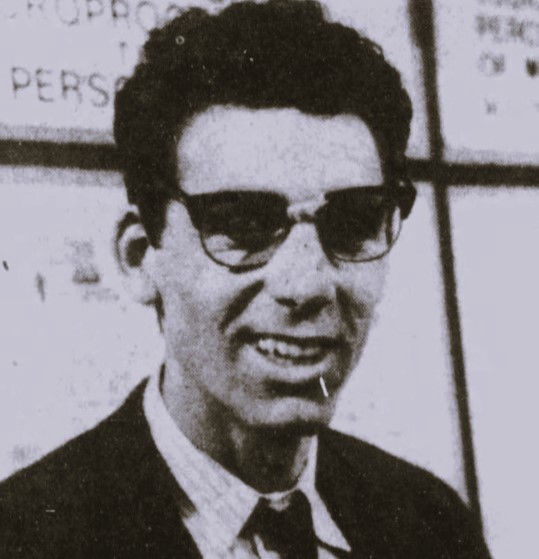
Richards in 1983

Richards got his big TV break in 1979, appearing in Billy Crystal's first cable TV special. In 1980, he began as one of the cast members on ABC's Fridays television show, where Larry David was a fellow cast member and writer. It included a famous instance in which Andy Kaufman refused to deliver his scripted lines, leading Richards to bring the cue cards on screen to Kaufman, who responded by throwing his drink into Richards's face, causing a small riot (Richards later claimed he was in on the joke). The film Man on the Moon featured a re-enactment of the Andy Kaufman incident where Richards was portrayed by actor Norm Macdonald.

In 1981, he appeared in the It's a Living episode "Desperate Hours". In 1986, Richards had a minor role in the cult satirical TV miniseries Fresno, playing one of a pair of inept criminal henchmen. That same year he auditioned to play Al Bundy in the TV series Married... with Children, but he was passed over for Ed O'Neill. In 1989, Richards had a supporting role in "Weird Al" Yankovic's comedy film UHF as janitor Stanley Spadowski. On television, he appeared in Miami Vice as an unscrupulous bookie; in St. Elsewhere as a television producer making a documentary about Dr. Mark Craig; in Cheers as a character trying to collect on an old bet with Sam Malone; and made several guest appearances with Jay Leno as an accident-prone fitness expert.

=== 1989–2005: Seinfeld and rise to prominence ===
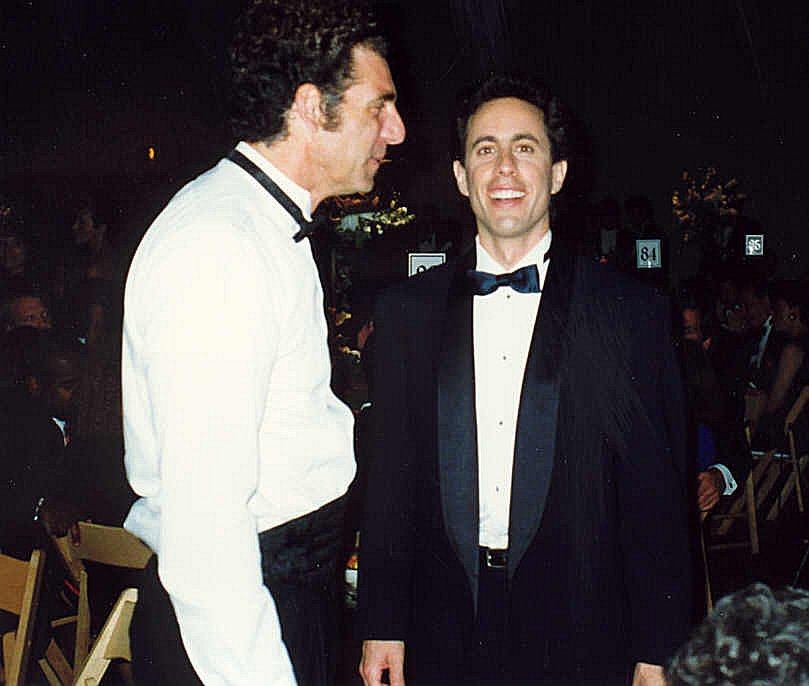
Richards with Jerry Seinfeld at the 44th Primetime Emmy Awards in 1992

In 1989, Richards was cast as Cosmo Kramer in the NBC television series Seinfeld, created by fellow Fridays cast member Larry David and comedian Jerry Seinfeld. Although it got off to a slow start, by the mid-1990s it had become one of the most popular sitcoms in television history. It ended its nine-year run in 1998 at No. 1 in the Nielsen ratings. In Seinfeld, Kramer is the neighbor across the hall of the show's eponymous character, and is usually referred to only by his last name. His first name, Cosmo, was revealed in the sixth-season episode "The Switch".

Richards won more Emmys than any other Seinfeld cast member, taking home the award for Outstanding Supporting Actor in a Comedy Series in 1993, 1994, and 1997 for his role as Kramer. When referring to speculation that he would launch a spin-off to Seinfeld about Kramer, Richards said he was not interested in doing so. During the run of Seinfeld, Richards made cameo appearances in several TV shows; he played himself in Episode 2 of Season 1 "The Flirt Episode" (1992) of the HBO series The Larry Sanders Show. He also had a cameo role in the comedy thriller film So I Married an Axe Murderer, credited as "insensitive man". In 1996, Richards made a cameo in Epcot's Ellen's Energy Adventure, where he portrayed a caveman discovering fire. He played radio station employee Doug Beech in Airheads, and co-starred with Jeff Daniels as an actor pretending to be a lawyer in 1997's Trial and Error. He also made guest appearances on Miami Vice, Night Court and Cheers.

In 2000, two years after the end of Seinfeld, Richards began work on a new series for NBC, his first major project since Seinfeld's finale. The Michael Richards Show, for which Richards received co-writer and co-executive producer credits, was conceived as a comedy/mystery starring Richards as a bumbling private investigator. When the first pilot failed with test audiences, NBC ordered that the show be retooled into a more conventional, office-based sitcom before its premiere. After a few weeks of poor ratings and negative reviews, it was canceled. Critics said the show was too "Kramer-esque" and Richards invoked the so-called "Seinfeld curse" as to why the show failed.

According to an interview with executive producer David Hoberman, ABC first conceived the series Monk with Richards in mind for the titular role; an Inspector Clouseau–like character suffering from obsessive-compulsive disorder. Richards ultimately turned down the role.

Starting in 2004, he and his fellow Seinfeld cast members provided interviews and audio commentaries for the Seinfeld DVDs. Richards stepped down from providing audio commentary after Season 5, though he continued to provide interviews.

=== 2006–2012: Laugh Factory incident and aftermath ===
During a performance on November 17, 2006, at the Laugh Factory in Los Angeles, Richards launched into a rant using racist epithets and remarks in response to repeated heckling and interruptions from a small group of black and Hispanic audience members. Richards was recorded shouting "He's a nigger!" several times and making references to lynching, Planet of the Apes, and Jim Crow laws. Kyle Doss, a member of the group that Richards addressed, said the group had arrived in the middle of the performance and were "being a little loud". According to Doss:

[Richards] said, "Look at the stupid Mexicans and blacks being loud up there." That's the first thing he said. And then he kept on with his bit. And then, after a while, I told him, "My friend doesn't think you're funny." And then when I told him that, that's when he flipped me off and said, "F-you N-word." And that's how it all started.

— Kyle Doss, Interview on The Situation Room

The incident remained unknown to the larger public for three days until a cell phone video filmed by a member of the audience was obtained and released by TMZ. On November 20, after the video made rounds around the news, Jerry Seinfeld invited Richards to appear via satellite during a broadcast of the Late Show with David Letterman, where Richards was recorded saying: "I'm not doing too good. I lost my temper on stage, I was at a comedy club trying to do my act and I got heckled and I took it badly and went into a rage. And uh, said some pretty, uh, nasty things to some Afro-Americans." Many studio audience members, thinking Richards was performing a bit, laughed as he gave his explanation and apology, leading Seinfeld to reprimand them, saying: "Stop laughing. It's not funny." Richards said he had been trying to defuse the heckling by being even more outrageous but it had backfired. He later called civil rights leaders Al Sharpton and Jesse Jackson to apologize. He also appeared as a guest on Jackson's syndicated radio show. Doss stated that he did not accept Richards's apology, saying: "If he wanted to apologize, he could have contacted ... one of us out of the group. But he didn't. He apologized on-camera just because the tape got out."

Richards's popularity among the general public declined after the tape was released. A Gallup poll conducted in late November found that only 41 percent of Americans still held a favorable view of Richards. By contrast, other Seinfeld cast members' favorability ratings were in the 70s and 80s. The same poll also found that 45 percent of non-whites expressed a negative view of Richards due to the incident. The incident was parodied on several TV shows, including Mad TV, Family Guy, South Park, Extras, Monday Night Raw and Smiling Friends. In the ninth episode of the seventh season of Curb Your Enthusiasm, Richards appeared as himself and poked fun at the incident. In 2008, rapper Wale referenced the incident and used recordings of the incident as well as Richards's apology, in the song "The Kramer" on The Mixtape About Nothing album.

One year after the incident, Richards voiced the character Bud Ditchwater in the animated film Bee Movie, which starred and was produced by Jerry Seinfeld. In 2009, Richards and the other main Seinfeld cast members appeared in the seventh season of Curb Your Enthusiasm. In 2012, he appeared in the comedy web series Comedians in Cars Getting Coffee, hosted by Seinfeld, in which he remarked on the 2006 incident. In the episode, Richards explained that the outburst still haunted him and was a major reason for his retirement from stand-up.

=== 2013–present ===
In 2013, Richards was cast to play Frank in the sitcom Kirstie, costarring Kirstie Alley and Rhea Perlman. It premiered on TV Land on December 4, 2013 and was canceled after one season. In 2014, Richards appeared as the president of Crackle in a trailer for Season 5 of Comedians in Cars Getting Coffee.

In 2019, Richards played Daddy Hogwood in the romantic comedy Faith, Hope & Love starring Peta Murgatroyd and Robert Krantz.

In June 2024, Richards released a memoir titled Entrances and Exits.

== Personal life ==
Richards and his first wife, a family therapist, were married for 18 years. They have one daughter, born in 1975. They separated in 1992 and divorced the following year. Through their daughter, Richards has two grandchildren.

In 2010, Richards married Beth Skipp, his girlfriend of eight years. They have one son, born in 2011.

Richards is a Freemason.

Richards revealed in his 2024 memoir Entrances and Exits that he survived stage 1 prostate cancer in 2018 via the surgical removal of his entire prostate.

== Filmography ==
=== Film ===
Year	Title	Role	Notes
1982	Young Doctors in Love	Malamud Callahan	
1984	The House of God	Dr. Pinkus	
1984	The Ratings Game	Sal	
1985	Transylvania 6-5000	Fejos	
1986	Whoops Apocalypse	Lacrobat	
1987	Choice Chance and Control	Victor Loudon	Driver's Ed video
1989	UHF	Stanley Spadowski	
1990	Problem Child	Martin Beck	
1993	Coneheads	Motel Clerk	
1993	So I Married an Axe Murderer	Insensitive Man	
1994	Airheads	Doug Beech	
1995	Unstrung Heroes	Danny Lidz	
1997	Redux Riding Hood	The Wolf	Voice; Short film
1997	Trial and Error	Richard "Ricky" Rietti	
2007	Bee Movie	Bud Ditchwater	Voice
2013	Walk the Light	Lester	Short film
2019	Faith, Hope & Love	Daddy Hogwood	

=== Television ===
Year	Title	Role	Notes
1980–1982	Fridays	Various roles	54 episodes; also writer
1982	Faerie Tale Theatre	King Geoffeey	Episode: "The Tale of the Frog Prince"
1983	Herndon	Dr. Herndon P. Stool	Television film
1984	Faerie Tale Theatre	Vince	Episode: "Pinocchio"
1984	At Your Service	Rick the gardener	Television film
1984	Night Court	Eugene Sleighbough	Episode: "Take My Wife, Please"
1984	The Ratings Game	Sal	Television film
1984–1985	St. Elsewhere	Bill Wolf	5 episodes
1985	Tall Tales & Legends	Sneaky Pete	Episode: "My Darlin' Clementine"
1985	Cheers	Eddie Gordon	Episode: "Bar Bet"
1985	Scarecrow and Mrs. King	Petronus	Episode: "Car Wars"
1985	Slickers	Mike Blade	Television film
1985	It's a Living	Hager	Episode: "Desperate Hours"
1985	Hill Street Blues	Special Agent Durpe	Episode: "An Oy for an Oy"
1986	Miami Vice	Pagone	Episode: "The Fix"
1986	A Year in the Life	Ronnie	3 episodes
1986	Fresno	2nd henchman	5 episodes
1987	Jonathan Winters: On the Ledge	Various roles	Television special
1987–1988	Marblehead Manor	Rick	11 episodes
1989	Camp MTV	Stanley Spadowski	Television film
1989–1998	Seinfeld	Cosmo Kramer	178 episodes
1992	Dinosaurs	Director	Voice; Episode: "Wesayso Knows Best"
1992	Mad About You	Cosmo Kramer	Episode: "The Apartment"
1992	The Larry Sanders Show	Himself	Episode: "The Flirt Episode"
1996	London Suite	Mark Ferris	Television film
2000	David Copperfield	Mr. Wilkins Micawber	Television film
2000	The Michael Richards Show	Vic Nardozza	8 episodes; also co-creator, writer, and executive producer
2009	Curb Your Enthusiasm	Michael Richards	3 episodes
2012–2014	Comedians in Cars Getting Coffee	Himself / Dick Corcoran	4 episodes
2013–2014	Kirstie	Frank	12 episodes

== Awards and nominations ==
Year	Association	Category	Performance	Result	Ref.
1995	American Comedy Awards	Funniest Supporting Actor in a Motion Picture	Unstrung Heroes	Nominated	
1995	American Comedy Awards	Funniest Supporting Male in a Television Series	Seinfeld	Nominated	
1996	American Comedy Awards	Funniest Supporting Male in a Television Series	Seinfeld	Nominated	
1993	Primetime Emmy Awards	Outstanding Supporting Actor in a Comedy Series	Seinfeld (episode: "The Junior Mint" + "The Watch")	Won	
1994	Primetime Emmy Awards	Outstanding Supporting Actor in a Comedy Series	Seinfeld (episode: "The Sniffing Accountant" + "The Opposite")	Won	
1995	Primetime Emmy Awards	Outstanding Supporting Actor in a Comedy Series	Seinfeld (episode: "The Jimmy" + "The Fusilli Jerry")	Nominated	
1996	Primetime Emmy Awards	Outstanding Supporting Actor in a Comedy Series	Seinfeld (episode: "The Pool Guy" + "The Wait Out")	Nominated	
1997	Primetime Emmy Awards	Outstanding Supporting Actor in a Comedy Series	Seinfeld (episode: "The Chicken Roaster")	Won	
1997	Satellite Award	Best Actor – Television Series Musical or Comedy	Seinfeld	Nominated	
1994	Screen Actors Guild Awards	Outstanding Ensemble in a Comedy Series	Seinfeld (season 6)	Won	
1995	Screen Actors Guild Awards	Outstanding Ensemble in a Comedy Series	Seinfeld (season 7)	Nominated	
1995	Screen Actors Guild Awards	Outstanding Actor in a Comedy Series	Seinfeld (season 7)	Nominated	
1996	Screen Actors Guild Awards	Outstanding Ensemble in a Comedy Series	Seinfeld (season 8)	Nominated	
1996	Screen Actors Guild Awards	Outstanding Actor in a Comedy Series	Seinfeld (season 8)	Nominated	
1997	Screen Actors Guild Awards	Outstanding Ensemble in a Comedy Series	Seinfeld (season 9)	Won	
1997	Screen Actors Guild Awards	Outstanding Actor in a Comedy Series	Seinfeld (season 9)	Nominated	

== Bibliography ==
- Richards, Michael (June 4, 2024). Entrances and Exits. Permuted Press. ISBN 978-1637589137.
