= Redux Riding Hood =

1997 American film

- Directed by: Steve Moore
- Written by: Dan O'Shannon
- Based on: Little Red Riding Hood
- Produced by: Steve Moore
- Starring: Michael Richards; Mia Farrow; Lacey Chabert
- Narrated by: Garrison Keillor
- Edited by: Colleen Halsey, Harry Hitner
- Music by: Bennie Wallace
- Production companies: Walt Disney Television Animation; Toonz Animation Ltd New Zealand
- Distributed by: Buena Vista Pictures
- Release date: August 5, 1997
- Running time: 14:55
- Country: United States
- Language: English

Redux Riding Hood is a 15-minute animated short film directed by Steve Moore and produced by Disney in 1997 that received an Oscar nomination for Best Animated Short Film.

The film was produced with cel animation and 2-D collage elements and it originated from a set of four short/featurettes planned by Disney and MovieToons (to be titled "Totally Twisted Fairy Tales"), which was also to include "Jack in the Beanstalk", "The Three Little Pigs" and a fourth cartoon that was never finalized. The idea was to make a more adult short by combining Disney artists and high-quality writers and their takes on classic fairy tales. Only Redux Riding Hood was released on August 5, 1997 in Encino, California to qualify it for the Academy Awards.

== Plot ==
Redux Riding Hood, written by sitcom writer Dan O'Shannon, tells the familiar story of Red Riding Hood from the point of view of the Big Bad Wolf. The Wolf (voiced by Michael Richards) is haunted by the decision to eat Red Riding Hood after dressing up as her grandmother, not because he regrets the choice, but because he's convinced he can do it better now that he's learned from his mistakes. To do that, he has to build a time machine and avoid his sheep wife, Doris, (Mia Farrow) whose become fed up with his obsession.

In his first attempt, the Big Bad Wolf succeeds in returning to the past where he finds his past self. He then advises him about what and what not to do and succeeds to knock out the Hunter, who was the reason of his failure, and capture Little Red Riding Hood with a double team. However, the two wolves never expect to lock Grandma in an armory closet, so she shoots at them with a machine gun. The two wolves return to the present with new regrets and failures. His wife advises them that they are probably not meant to catch Red Riding Hood, but they are too obsessed on their failures to listen.

In his second attempt, the two wolves now have a triple team and succeeded to dodge their failures but never expect Red's scream is loud enough to set off the fire alarm flooding the three wolves out of Grandma's house. After that, the wolves make a series of ridiculous failures that keep increasing until he has hundreds of past selves. The wolf and his past selves keep changing his fate and still search for solution with even more bizarre endings. Doris can't take it anymore and feels like she deserves better. Eventually, she decides to take his time machine for herself and correct her biggest regret; she decides to marry a fox named Leonard. The wolf and all his past selves continue bickering and planning to this very day.

== Cast ==
Actor	Role
Garrison Keillor	The Narrator
Michael Richards	The Wolf
Mia Farrow	Doris
Lacey Chabert	Red Riding Hood
June Foray	Grandma
Fabio	The Woodsman
Don Rickles	The Boss
Jim Cummings	Thompkins
Adam West	Leonard Fox

== Production ==
The show was produced by Walt Disney Television Animation (DTVA) and Toonz Animation Ltd New Zealand with an uncredited DTVA unit, Disney MovieToons. Gnome Productions Ltd. New Zealand was credited as an additional production facility. Buena Vista Imaging produced titles and opticals.

Departing from Disney's tradition of family entertainment, Redux was supposed to be the first in a line of "Totally Twisted Fairy Tales": reinvented fairy tales with an offbeat, adult-oriented, comedic slant through the talents of veteran sitcom (Cheers, Newhart) writer Dan O'Shannon and animation producer/director Steve Moore. Voices are provided by luminaries like Seinfeld's Michael Richards, Don Rickles, Lacey Chabert (Party of Five) and Mia Farrow.

The series was a creative project that brought light back to animators that were down from a lack of non-adult projects. Through the prospect of "Redux", O'Shannon opened up doors for out of the ordinary imaginative writers. The film was well received, scoring an Oscar nomination until Disney put it on the shelf in 1998, where it has remained ever since.

== Music ==
The music was arranged by jazz great Bennie Wallace, his credibility in music reached great lengths especially in this production. The melody was inspired from Charles Mingus' album Mingus Mingus Mingus Mingus Mingus. Bennie set to the task, casting his musicians to get the right sound - among them Robben Ford on guitar, Emil Richards on percussion instruments, Art Baron on trombone, Alex Acuna brought a Latin beat on drums, and Bennie himself on Sax. The music was recorded at Capitol Records in Hollywood, in Sinatra's old stage.

== See also ==
- Shrek - a 2001 film that similarly skewers traditional fairy tales
- Chicken Little - a 2005 feature-length Disney film that serves as a reimagined story to a classic tale
- Hoodwinked! - a 2005 film that reexamines the tale of Little Red Riding Hood, again from multiple viewpoints, including the wolf's
