= Magnificent Desolation: Walking on the Moon 3D =

- Theatrical release poster
- Directed by: Mark Cowen
- Written by: Mark Cowen; Tom Hanks; Christopher G. Cowen
- Produced by: Mark Cowen; Tom Hanks; Gary Goetzman; Mark Herzog
- Starring: Tom Hanks; Paul Newman; Morgan Freeman; John Travolta; Scott Glenn; Matt Damon; Gary Sinise; Bryan Cranston; Matthew McConaughey
- Cinematography: Sean MacLeod Phillips
- Edited by: Billy Shinski
- Music by: James Newton Howard; Blake Neely
- Production company: Playtone
- Distributed by: IMAX
- Release date: September 23, 2005
- Running time: 40 minutes
- Country: United States
- Language: English
- Budget: $3 million
- Box office: $40.9 million

Magnificent Desolation: Walking on the Moon 3D is a 2005 IMAX 3D documentary film about the first humans on the Moon, the twelve astronauts in the Apollo program.

It is co-written, produced and directed by Mark Cowen, and co-written, produced and narrated by Tom Hanks.

== Production ==
The film includes historical NASA footage as well as re-enactments and computer-generated imagery. Tom Hanks is the narrator, co-writer and co-producer. Magnificent Desolation is the third Apollo-related project for Hanks: he was previously involved in the film Apollo 13 and the miniseries From the Earth to the Moon. The cast includes Andrew Husmann, Aaron White, Brandy Blackledge, Gary Hershberger, and Scott Wilder. The voice cast includes Morgan Freeman, John Travolta, Paul Newman, Matt Damon, Matthew McConaughey. Bryan Cranston reprised his From the Earth to the Moon roles as Buzz Aldrin, respectively; many of the other actors had previously portrayed different people depicted in the film, in From the Earth to the Moon, The Right Stuff, and/or Apollo 13.

The film was released in IMAX theaters on September 23, 2005. It was released on DVD on November 6, 2007.

== Origins of title ==
The title comes from Buzz Aldrin's description of the lunar landscape:

Aldrin: Beautiful view!
Armstrong: Isn't that something! Magnificent sight out here.
Aldrin: Magnificent desolation.

Aldrin's statement was substantially predicted nineteen years earlier in the film, Destination Moon (1950), in which Charles Cargraves, the fictional second man on the Moon, states "The first impression is one of utter barrenness and desolation."

== Cast ==
- Tom Hanks as The Narrator (voice) [portrayed Jim Lovell in Apollo 13 and hosted From the Earth to the Moon eps. 1-11]
- John Corbett as Harrison Schmitt (voice)
- Andrew Husmann as David Scott
- Bryan Cranston as Buzz Aldrin (voice) [reprised From the Earth to the Moon role, portrayed Gus Grissom in That Thing You Do]
- Aaron White as James Irwin
- Matt Damon as Alan Shepard (voice)
- John Travolta as James Irwin (voice)
- Morgan Freeman as Neil Armstrong (voice)
- Gary Hershberger as Astronaut Grace
- Scott Wilder as Astronaut Wallace
- Brandy Blackledge as Future Astronaut
- Scott Glenn as Charles Duke (voice) [portrayed Alan Shepard in The Right Stuff]
- Rick Gomez as Alpha Station Commander (voice)
- Colin Hanks as Conspiracy Neil Armstrong
- Bo Stevenson as Conspiracy Grip
- Frank John Hughes as Future Houston Capcom (voice)
- Tim Matheson as Houston Capcom (voice)
- Matthew McConaughey as Alan Bean (voice)
- Neal McDonough as Reservoir Commander (voice)
- Paul Newman as David Scott (voice)
- Bill Paxton as Edgar Mitchell (voice) [portrayed Fred Haise in Apollo 13]
- Barry Pepper as John Young (voice)
- Kevin Pollak as Director (voice) [portrayed Joe Shea in From the Earth to the Moon and the voice of Pres. Eisenhower in The Right Stuff]
- Julie Shimer as Future Astronaut (voice)
- Gary Sinise as Eugene Cernan (voice) [portrayed Ken Mattingly in Apollo 13]
- Peter Scolari as Pete Conrad (voice)
- Donnie Wahlberg as Helium 3 Commander (voice)
- Rita Wilson as Beta Station Commander (voice) [portrayed Susan Borman in From the Earth to the Moon]

== Awards ==
On February 16, 2006, Jack Geist, Johnathan Banta, and Jerome Morin received the award for Outstanding Visual Effects in a Special Venue Film from the Visual Effects Society for their work on the film.

== See also ==
- Apollo 11 in popular culture
