= Mario Marcelino =

20th century American actor

- Occupation: Television actor

Mario Marcelino is an American actor, possibly best known for his role as Mario Nunouz in the television soap opera Falcon Crest.

He has also appeared in Knight Rider, Airwolf and the film Star Trek III: The Search for Spock.

A 1984 episode, "Race for Life", of Knight Rider was dedicated to his son Marcel Rafael Marcelino, who died during filming.

== Filmography ==
Year	Title	Role	Notes
1981	CHiPs	Rivas	
1983	Porky's Revenge!	Pablo	
1984	Star Trek III: The Search for Spock	Communications (USS Grissom)	
1986	Free Ride	Vito Garbagio	
