= Tom William Scott =

United States Air Force general

- Born: October 8, 1902; Wichita, Kansas, U.S.
- Died: December 23, 1988 (aged 86); La Jolla, California, U.S.
- Burial place: Fort Rosecrans National Cemetery
- Relatives: David Scott (son)
- Military career
- Allegiance: United States of America
- Branch: United States Air Force
- Service years: 1930–1957
- Rank: Brigadier General
- Conflicts: World War II; Korean War
- Awards: Legion of Merit (2); Bronze Star Medal; Croix de Guerre 1939–1945 (France)

Tom William Scott (October 8, 1902 – December 22, 1988) was a brigadier general in the U.S. Air Force who served in World War II and the Korean War. He started his military career in 1930, becoming a fighter pilot and flying instructor. He was posted to the Philippines in the late 1930s. He commanded an air base in the United Kingdom during World War II. During the Korean War he served as vice commander of the 20th Air Force and went on two combat missions. He retired in 1957. He was the father of astronaut David Scott.

== Early career ==
Tom William Scott was born in Wichita, Kansas, on October 8, 1902. He graduated from the University of California, Berkeley in 1926, and was commissioned as a second lieutenant in the United States Army Air Corps in May 1930.

Scott served as a fighter pilot and assistant aircraft engineering officer at Rockwell Field, California, and as a flying instructor and supply and mess officer at March Field, California. His promotion to first lieutenant was confirmed on August 12, 1935. He was stationed at Nicholas Field in the Philippines from 1937 to 1939. On returning to the United States, he was posted to Brooks Field, Texas.

== World War II and postwar ==
During World War II, Scott served as chief of the Sub-Depot Control Section at Duncan Field, Texas, and deputy commander of the San Antonio Air Materiel Area. He went to Europe in January 1944, where he commanded several air base depots there. At one time, he was commander of the Burtonwood Air Depot, which was the chief maintenance depot for aircraft flying over Europe.

Scott returned to the United States in 1946, and became the deputy chief of staff for materiel of the 12th Air Force at March Field. He attended the Industrial College of the Armed Forces in 1949, and then became the deputy commander of Ellington Air Force Base in Texas. In September 1949, he was posted to Vance Air Force Base in Oklahoma as a wing and base commander, and served as the deputy commander of the Flying Training Air Force at Waco, Texas until 1952.

Scott then became the vice commander of the 20th Air Force, and he saw action in the Korean War, flying two combat missions in Boeing B-29 Superfortress bombers. In 1954, he was posted to Wright-Patterson Air Force Base in Ohio as the deputy commander for supply of the Air Materiel Command. In this capacity, he was second in command of the world-wide supply activities of the Air Force, including the Mutual Defense Assistance Program. His promotion to brigadier general was confirmed by the United States Senate on November 8, 1954. His final posting, on July 15, 1955, was deputy commander of the San Antonio Air Materiel Area, at San Antonio, Texas. He retired on March 1, 1957. Scott's decorations include the Legion of Merit with an oak leaf cluster, the Bronze Star Medal and the Croix de Guerre with palm.

In 1961, Scott settled in La Jolla, California and became a member of the La Jolla Shores Protective Association the following year. He was a La Jolla Town Council trustee from 1966 to 1972. He died there on December 22, 1988. A memorial service was held at St. James by-the-Sea Episcopal Church in La Jolla, and he was buried at Fort Rosecrans National Cemetery in San Diego, California. He was survived by his wife, Marian, and sons Tom Junior and David Scott. David became an astronaut in 1963, and walked on the Moon as commander of Apollo 15 in 1971.
