= Faith, Hope & Love =

2019 film by J.J. Englert and Robert Krantz

- Directed by: J.J. Englert; Robert Krantz
- Written by: Robert Krantz
- Produced by: Robert Krantz
- Starring: Peta Murgatroyd; Robert Krantz; Michael Richards; Corbin Bernsen; M. Emmet Walsh; Natasha Bure; Nancy Stafford; Gary Hershberger; Aria Walters; Edward Asner; Soomin Chun; Raymond Forchion; Dennis Garr; Karen Y. McClain; Ambrit Millhouse; Joey Nader
- Cinematography: Pascal Combes-Knoke
- Edited by: Robert Krantz
- Music by: Ryan Stratton; Robert Mai
- Production company: Ellinas Multimedia
- Distributed by: ArtAffects Entertainment
- Release date: March 15, 2019
- Running time: 106 minutes
- Country: United States
- Language: English

Faith, Hope & Love is a 2019 American romantic comedy film directed by J.J. Englert and Robert Krantz and starring Peta Murgatroyd, Krantz, Michael Richards, Corbin Bernsen, Natasha Bure and Ed Asner in one of his final film roles.

== Cast ==
- Peta Murgatroyd as Faith Turley
- Robert Krantz as Jimmy Hope
- Michael Richards as Daddy Hogwood
- Corbin Bernsen as Brian Fuller
- M. Emmet Walsh as Fr. John
- Natasha Bure as Gia Elpidas
- Nancy Stafford as Mary Sue
- Gary Hershberger as Tommy
- Aria Walters as Demetra Elpidas
- Ed Asner as Harry Karetas
- Soomin Chun as Amy Chen
- Raymond Forchion as Joe
- Dennis Garr as Security Guard
- Karen Y. McClain as Coretta Maxwell
- Ambrit Millhouse as Jasmine
- Joey Nader as Joey

== Reception ==
Tara McNamara of Common Sense Media awarded the film four stars out of five. On the review aggregation website Rotten Tomatoes, the film has a rating of 80% based on 5 reviews, with an average rating of 6.9/10.
