= Gary Hershberger =

American actor

- Born: April 5, 1964 (age 62); Inglewood, California, U.S.
- Other name: Garrison Hershberger
- Occupations: Actor; screenwriter
- Years active: 1984–present
- Children: 4

Gary Hershberger (born April 5, 1964) is an American actor and screenwriter. He is best known for his television roles as Mike Nelson in Twin Peaks (1989–1991; 2017) and Matthew Gilardi on Six Feet Under (2001–2002).

== Early life and education ==
Hershberger was born in Inglewood, California. From 1982 to 1986, he studied history and communication at the University of California, Los Angeles.

== Career ==
=== Acting ===
He is probably best known for Twin Peaks, appearing the 1990 original series on ABC, the movie and the 2017 revival.

Film roles include a mix of starring and supporting roles in Paradise Motel, My Man Adam, Free Ride, Beverly Hills Madam, Burglar, The Siege of Firebase Gloria, The Heroes of Desert Storm, Forever Love, Deep Core, Sneakers, Faith, Hope & Love, One Man's Hero, and the IMAX documentary Magnificent Desolation: Walking on the Moon 3D. TV movie roles include Into the Homeland, Perry Mason: The Case of the Avenging Ace, The Love She Sought, and The Christmas Pageant.

Hershberger has appeared in episodes of Grey's Anatomy, The West Wing, Murder, She Wrote, Columbo, The OC, JAG, Knight Rider, Highway to Heaven, China Beach, and the pilot episode of The Whispers.

=== Screenwriting and the Actor's Director Workshop ===
He is a screenwriter and co-wrote the TV movie Python. He won a PAGE International Screenwriting Award, and he was a finalist for other screenwriting awards.

He and his Twin Peaks co-star Sheryl Lee co-founded the Actor's Director Workshop. They have taught at the University of Southern California, UCLA, Pepperdine, and Loyola Marymount University.

His production company is called Deer Mountain Productions.

== Personal life ==
He is married with four children.

== Filmography ==
=== Film ===
Year	Title	Role	Notes
1985	Paradise Motel	Sam Kehoe	
1985	My Man Adam	Stan	
1986	Free Ride	Dan Garten	
1987	Burglar	Young Officer	
1989	The Siege of Firebase Gloria	Moran	
1992	Twin Peaks: Fire Walk with Me	Mike Nelson	
1992	Sneakers	College-Aged Bishop	
1996	Last Resort	Night Eagle	
1999	One Man's Hero	Eammon Daly	
2000	Deep Core	Henry	
2000	The Amati Girls	Kevin	
2001	New Alcatraz	Goodman	
2005	Magnificent Desolation: Walking on the Moon 3D	Astronaut Grace	
2014	Twin Peaks: The Missing Pieces	Mike Nelson	
2019	Faith, Hope & Love	Tommy	
2020	Magic Max	Mike	

=== Television ===
Year	Title	Role	Notes
1984	Summer	Alex Pierce	Television film
1985	Knight Rider	Nicholas Arkett	Episode: "The Wrong Crowd"
1985	Tales from the Darkside	Jeff	Episode: "Effect and Cause"
1986	Beverly Hills Madam	Justin	Television film
1986	Highway to Heaven	Danny	Episode: "Code Name: FREAK"
1987	Tonight's the Night	Ronnie	Television film
1987	Into the Homeland	Whitey	Television film
1988	Terrorist on Trial: The United States vs. Salim Ajami	Marine Guard	Television film
1988	Perry Mason: The Case of the Avenging Ace	Lieutenant Wilkins	Television film
1988	21 Jump Street	Michael McCarter	Episode: "Hell Week"
1989	Coach	Carter Frederickson	Episode: "Whose Team Is It, Anyway?"
1989	China Beach		Episode: "Vets" (archive footage)
1989–1991	Twin Peaks	Mike Nelson	13 episodes
1990	A Green Journey	Randy Meers	Television film
1990	Columbo	Cooper Redman	Episode: "Columbo Goes to College"
1991	The Heroes of Desert Storm	Capt. Steve Tate	Television film
1991	The Trials of Rosie O'Neill	Shane Gray / Wade Robert Cameron	Episode: “Happy Birthday or Else”
1993	Class of '96	Nathan	Episode: "Midterm Madness"
1993, 1994, 1996	Murder, She Wrote	Timothy Flint / Rob MacKenzie / Dave Perrin	3 episodes
1994	Renegade	Deputy Morgan	Episode: "The Posse"
1997	Sleeping with the Devil	Jim	Television film
1998	Forever Love	Chuck	Television film
1998	Cupid	Gabe	Episode: "End of an Eros"
1998, 2000	JAG	Rodney Conger / Commander Crowley	2 episodes
1999	Martial Law	Henry Riggins	Episode: "Trifecta"
1999	Pacific Blue	Bartender Jim	2 episodes
2000	Chicago Hope	Daniel O'Connor	Episode: "Miller Time"
2000	The West Wing	Jerry	Episode: "In the Shadow of Two Gunmen: Part I"
2001	Family Law	Abe Fitzhugh	Episode: "All in the Family"
2001–2002	Six Feet Under	Matthew Gilardi	8 episodes
2004	Century City	Maxwell Pace	Episode: "Without a Tracer"
2005	The O.C.	Tom MacGinty	Episode: "The O.C. Confidential"
2007	Grey's Anatomy	Doug	2 episodes
2011	Big Love	Bob Chetney	Episode: "Winter"
2011	The Christmas Pageant	Zach Wilson	Television film
2012	Blackout	Bradford Langdon	Episode: "Part I"
2015	The Whispers	President Chip Winters	Episode: "X Marks the Spot"
2017	Twin Peaks: The Return	Mike Nelson	Episode: "Part 5"

=== Screenwriting ===
Year	Title	Notes
2000	Python	Television film
