= Free Ride (1986 film) =

1986 film

- Laserdisc release
- Directed by: Tom Trbovich
- Written by: Robert C. Bell; Lee Fulkerson; Ronald Z. Wang
- Produced by: Moustapha Akkad; Bassem Abdallah; Tom Boutross
- Starring: Gary Hershberger; Reed Rudy; Dawn Schneider; Peter DeLuise; Brian MacGregor
- Cinematography: Paul Lohmann
- Edited by: Ron Honthaner
- Music by: David C. Williams
- Distributed by: Galaxy International Releasing
- Release date: May 1986
- Running time: 92 minutes
- Country: United States
- Language: English

Free Ride is a 1986 comedy film that starred Gary Hershberger, Reed Rudy Dawn Schneider Mamie Van Doren, Peter DeLuise and Frank Campanella.

== Plot ==
A group of teenagers borrow a car, unaware that gangsters have stashed mob money in it. The gangsters are determined to get the money back. When it seems that the criminals are going to prevail over the boys, the intervention of a strong policewoman changes the fortunes of the battle in favor of the boys.

== Cast ==
- Gary Hershberger as Dan Garten
- Reed Rudy as Greg Novak
- Dawn Schneider as Jill Monroe
- Peter DeLuise as Carl Beluga
- Brian MacGregor as Elmer Reynolds
- Warren Berlinger as Dean Stockwell
- Mamie Van Doren as Debbie Stockwell
- Renee Props as Kathy
- Chick Vennera as Edgar Ness
- Anthony Charnota as Vinnie Garbagio
- Mario Marcelino as Vito Garbagio
- Joe Tornatore as Murray Garbagio
- Ken Olfson as Mr. Stanley Lennox
- Liam Sullivan as Mr. Monroe
- Frank Campanella as Old Man Garbagio
- Tally Chanel as Candy
- Terresa Hafford as Monique
- Vicki Seton as Marie
- Kevin Welch as Brent
- Karen L. Scott as Stuck-Up Woman
- Mary Garripoli as Girl In Slip
- Crystal Smart as Vito's Girlfriend
- Elizabeth Cochrell as Nude Girl #1
- Krista Lane as Nude Girl #2
- Millie Moss as Lady In Disco #1
- Roberta Smart as Lady In Disco #2
- Caroline Davis as Lady In Disco #3
- Christina MacGregor as Jill's Friend
- Robert Apisa as Thug #1
- Michael Carr as Thug #2
- Diana Bellamy as Woman Guard
- Sasha Jenson as Boy #1
- John Washington as Boy #2
- Robert De Frank as The Bartender

== Home media ==
The movie was released on VHS in the United States by International Video Entertainment in 1987 and that same year in Canada by Cineplex Odeon. A LaserDisc release followed in 1992 also in the United States by Live Home Video. As of 2022, there has been no Region 1 DVD nor have there been any plans so far for a Region 1 Blu-ray.
