= Diana Bellamy =

American actress (1943–2001)

- Born: September 19, 1943; Los Angeles, California, U.S.
- Died: June 17, 2001 (aged 57); Valley Village, Los Angeles, U.S.
- Occupation: Actress
- Years active: 1970–2001

Diana Alice Bellamy (September 19, 1943 – June 17, 2001) was an American character actress of stage, film, and television, during the 1980s and mid-90s who was often cast in both comedic and dramatic roles to great acclaim. Bellamy is known for her starring role as Head Nurse Maggie Poole in the NBC comedy 13 East, as Principal Cecilia Hall in Popular, as Mrs. Pananides in Outbreak, and as Switchboard Operator in Air Force One.

== Life and career ==
Bellamy was born on September 19, 1943, in Los Angeles, California. Her family had ties to the establishment of Early Virginia and her father, Victor "Vic" Bellamy, was a Juilliard graduate and opera singer who later became a local Western actor. Diana did her undergraduate work at the University of South Florida in Tampa, where she was active in the theater department. She attended Southern Methodist University (SMU) from which she graduated with a fine arts master's degree in 1970. She began her career with her own puppet theater in her native Los Angeles and later began working professionally on the stage. Some of her stage work consists of appearances in The House of Blue Leaves at the Pasadena Playhouse, The Skin of Our Teeth at the Old Globe Theatre in San Diego and the title role in Sister Mary Ignatius Explains It All for You at Theater Geo in Los Angeles, and the handicapped Mrs. Nichols in Dorothy Parker’s The Ladies of the Corridor at the Tamarind Theater. In 1986, the Los Angeles Times wrote that she became her character of a snake handler in Talking With... (1986). "This is not an actress," they wrote, "this is a swamp woman holding a box with holes in it." She was praised in her role of Sister Mary in Sister Mary Ignatius Explains It All For You at Theatre Geo in 1994. The Los Angeles Times wrote, "When Bellamy is good, she is very, very good."

In 1986 she was the policewoman who helped the young protagonists to defeat the criminal gang in Tom Trbovich's Free Ride.

Although she suffered from cancer, blindness, and diabetes she pursued a career in acting and she later went on to appear in over 80 film and TV roles throughout the 1980s up until her death, some of which included Murder, She Wrote; Tall Tales and Legends; Matlock; Alien Nation; Married... with Children; Life Goes On; Family Ties; Murphy Brown; Baywatch; Grace Under Fire; Wings; Seinfeld; Living Single; The Secret World of Alex Mack; and Life with Roger. Her film appearances included Malice, Air Force One, Outbreak, Ghosts of Mississippi, and Outrageous Fortune. Her first regular television role was as Nurse Poole in 13 East, which started in 1989. Her final role was a guest spot on Diagnosis Murder in the episode Being of Sound Mind which aired on March 2, 2001.

== Death ==
Bellamy died from cancer at her home in Valley Village, Los Angeles, on June 17, 2001, at the age of 57. A memorial service was held for Bellamy on July 7, 2001, at the Court Theater in West Hollywood, California, and her cremains were scattered in the Pacific Ocean. Bellamy, in her own words, said of her health in a 1999 interview, "I had tried crying and being in a snit about blindness, but that was real boring. I've learned to live with it as best I can, and I feel very blessed that this has happened."

== Filmography ==
=== Cinema ===
- 1983 D.C. Cab as Maudie
- 1985 Police Academy 2: Their First Assignment as Nurse
- 1986 Free Ride as Woman Guard
- 1986 My Chauffeur as Blue Lady
- 1986 Crossroads as Hospital Supervisor
- 1986 Odd Jobs as Woman In Restaurant
- 1987 Outrageous Fortune as Madam
- 1987 Stripped to Kill as Shirl
- 1987 Blind Date as Maid
- 1987 Maid to Order as Woman In Unemployment Office
- 1987 Born in East L.A. as Harry's Wife
- 1987 Under Cover (1987) as Lynette Destens
- 1988 The Nest as Mrs. Pennington
- 1988 Spellbinder as Grace Woods
- 1991 Critters 3 as Rosalie
- 1992 Passed Away as "Froggie"
- 1992 Passed Away as B.J.
- 1993 Malice as Ms. Worthington
- 1995 Outbreak as Mrs. Pananides
- 1996 Diabolique as Ms. Vawze
- 1996 Ghosts of Mississippi as Barbara Holder
- 1997 Air Force One as Switchboard Operator

=== Television ===
- 1983 The Skin of Our Teeth as Miss E. Muse / Ivy
- 1985 Condor (TV Movie) as Opera Singer
- 1986 Hunter as Waterworks Receptionist
- 1987 Married... with Children as Shirley
- 1988 Shootdown (TV Movie) as Lillian
- 1989 The Final Days as Rose Mary Woods
- 1989 Alien Nation as Betsy Ross
- 1989-1990 13 East as Maggie Poole
- 1992 Baywatch Abigail Kenilworth Season 3 Episode 15, 16 Vacation Part 1 and Part 2
- 1992 On the Air as Ethel Thissle
- 1994 Living Single as Judge Glazer
- 1994 Amelia Earhart: The Final Flight (TV Movie) as Mrs. Atkinson
- 1994-1995 Superhuman Samurai Syber-Squad as Cha-Cha Rimba Starkey
- 1996 Married... with Children as Shirley
- 1996 Wings as Mother (voice)
- 1997 Desert's Edge (TV Movie)
- 1999-2001 Popular as Principal Cecelia Hall

=== Theater ===
- 1981 Funny Girl at Sebastian's/West as Mama Brice
- 1984 Creatures at Odyssey Theatre as Sister Ratissa
- 1985 The Serving of Two Masters at Playbill Theatre as Adaptation
- 1985 Romeo and Juliet at The Globe Playhouse as The Nurse
- 1986 Why Hanna's Skirt Won't Stay Down at Coast Playhouse as Sophie
- 1986 Talking With... at the Olio Theater as Snake Handler
- 1987 Mensch Meier at the Odyssey Theatre as Mama
- 1987 The House of Blue Leaves at the Pasadena Playhouse as Sister Superior
- 1992 Lady-Like at the Philadelphia Theatre Company as Mary Carryll
- 1994 Sister Mary Ignatius Explains It All For You at Theatre Geo as Sister Mary
- 1996 Weekend in Goshen at Theatre Geo as Art's Mother
