= Peta Murgatroyd =

Australian-American Latin dancer

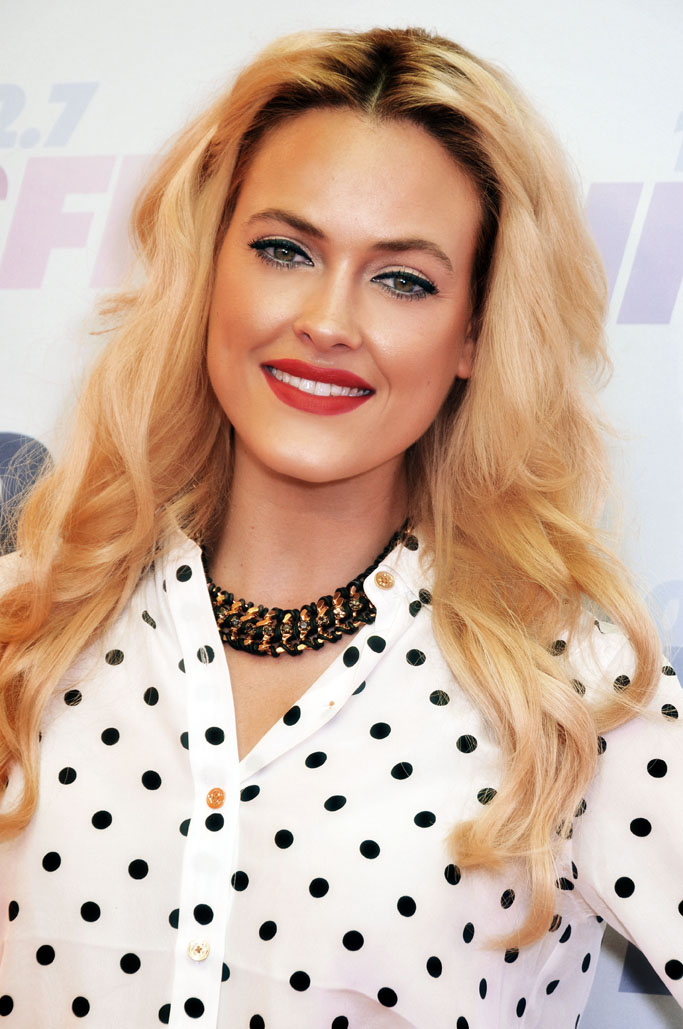
- Murgatroyd in 2013
- Born: Peta Jane Murgatroyd; 14 July 1986 (age 40); Auckland, New Zealand
- Occupations: Dancer; choreographer
- Spouse: Maksim Chmerkovskiy (m. 2017)
- Children: 3
- Relatives: Valentin Chmerkovskiy (brother-in-law); Jenna Johnson (sister-in-law)

Peta Jane Murgatroyd (born 14 July 1986) is an Australian and American professional Latin dancer. She performed in the international tour of the dance production Burn the Floor, including its Broadway run. She is best known for her appearances on the American edition of Dancing with the Stars, which she and her partners have won twice.

== Early life ==
Murgatroyd was born in Auckland, New Zealand, but moved to Australia when she was 18 months old; as a result, she considers herself more of an Australian. She was raised in Perth, Western Australia, and started studying classical ballet at age 4. She trained for 12 years under former principal dancer of the Kirov Ballet, Madame Lubov Nikonorenko. An ankle injury at the age of 16 forced her to give up ballet. Murgatroyd then took up Latin dancing.

== Career ==
Within months of beginning ballroom training, Murgatroyd became the W.A. Amateur Latin State Champion in 2002 and won the title again in 2003. She placed second in the Great World City Championships. Success at other competitions followed quickly; she was a semi-finalist in the Lion City Championships in Singapore and was a finalist in the Australian Open Championships. She placed third in the world at the Blackpool Dance Festival Youth Under 21 Latin competitions in 2005.

In 2018, she starred alongside Robert Krantz in the heartwarming, faith-based movie Faith, Hope & Love. She played the owner of a dance studio who is paired with a widower of two girls, in an amateur dancing contest.

== Business ventures ==
Peta is the founder of Peta Jane Beauty, a self-tanning brand launched in 2015.

=== Burn the Floor ===
Murgatroyd joined the cast of Burn the Floor in 2004, touring with them around the world for six years. When Burn the Floor landed on Broadway in August 2009, Murgatroyd was the lead female dancer.

=== Dancing with the Stars ===
Murgatroyd joined the cast of Dancing with the Stars in 2011 as a member of the dance troupe in season 12. She became a regular member of the professional cast as of season 13.

Season	Partner	Place
13	Metta World Peace	12th
14	Donald Driver	1st
15	Gilles Marini	6th
16	Sean Lowe	6th
17	Brant Daugherty	7th
18	James Maslow	4th
19	Tommy Chong	5th
20	Michael Sam	10th
22	Nyle DiMarco	1st
24	Nick Viall	6th
25	Nick Lachey	9th
28	Lamar Odom	10th
29	Vernon Davis	11th
31	Jason Lewis	16th
32	Barry Williams	7th

Dancing with the Stars (Season 13)

In season 13, Murgatroyd competed on the show as a professional with basketball player Metta World Peace. Not only were they the first couple eliminated off the show, but also it marked Peta’s earliest exit in the competition.

Week #	Dance/song	Judges' score			Result
Week #	Dance/song	Inaba	Goodman	Tonioli	Result
1	Cha-Cha-Cha / "Krazy"	5	4	5	Eliminated

Dancing with the Stars (Season 14)

In 2012, Murgatroyd was again featured as a professional dancer competing on season 14 as the partner of football player Donald Driver. On 22 May, it was announced that the couple was the winner of the competition. She is the second professional to win after finishing last the prior season, after Kym Johnson.

Week #	Dance/song	Judges' score			Result
Week #	Dance/song	Inaba	Goodman	Tonioli	Result
1	Cha-Cha-Cha / "Dedication to My Ex (Miss That)"	7	7	7	No elimination
2	Quickstep / "Stay the Night"	8	8	8	Safe
3	Rumba / "One Sweet Day"	9	8	9	Safe
4	Paso Doble / "Purple Haze"	9	9	9	Safe
5	Argentine Tango / "Sin Rumbo"	10	8	9	Safe
6	Foxtrot / "The Way You Do the Things You Do"; Motown Marathon / "Nowhere to Run"	9 Awarded	9; 7	9 Points	Safe
7	Viennese Waltz / "La Donna è Mobile"; Team Paso Doble – "O Fortuna"	9; 9	9; 8	9; 9	Safe
8	Tango / "Higher Ground"; Jive / "Rip It Up"	9; 10	9; 9	9; 9	Safe
9	Waltz / "Kissing You"; Samba / "Mr. Big Stuff"	9; 10	9; 9	10; 10	Last to be Called Safe
10	Argentine Tango / "They"; Freestyle / "I Play Chicken with the Train"; Cha-Cha-Cha / "Beggin'"	10; 10; 10	9; 10; 10	10; 10; 10	Winner

Dancing with the Stars (Season 15)

For season 15, Murgatroyd was partnered with actor and season 8 runner up Gilles Marini. They ended up in sixth place.

Week #	Dance/song	Judges' score			Result
Week #	Dance/song	Inaba	Goodman	Tonioli	Result
1	Foxtrot / "Call Me Irresponsible"	8	8	8	Safe
2	Jive / "Don't Stop Me Now"	8.5	8.5	8.5	Safe
3	Tango / "Sweet Dreams (Are Made of This)"	8.5	8.5	8.5	Safe
4	Bollywood / "Jai Ho (You Are My Destiny)"	10	9.5/10	10	Safe
5	Rumba / "I Will Always Love You"; Team Freestyle / "Gangnam Style"	10; 9	9.5; 9	10; 9	No elimination
6	Cha-Cha-Cha / "Man! I Feel Like a Woman!"	9	9	9.5	Safe
7	Argentine Tango & Samba Fusion / "When I Get You Alone"; Swing Marathon / "Do Your Thing"	9.5; Awarded	9.5; 5	9.5; Points	No elimination
8	Quickstep / "Danger Zone"; Salsa / "Rebelión"	9.5; 9.5	10; 10	10; 9.5	Eliminated

Dancing with the Stars (Season 16)

In 2013, Murgatroyd was again featured as a professional dancer competing on season 16 as the partner of The Bachelor star Sean Lowe. They landed in sixth place.

Week #	Dance/song	Judges' score			Result
Week #	Dance/song	Inaba	Goodman	Tonioli	Result
1	Foxtrot / "The Power of Love"	7	6	6	No elimination
2	Jive / "(Let's Get Movin') Into Action"	7	6	7	Safe
3	Cha-cha-cha / "YMCA"	7	7	7	Safe
4	Viennese Waltz / "I Won't Give Up"	6	7	7	Safe
5	Quickstep / "Go Get It"	8	8	8	Safe
6	Samba / "I Wish"; Team Samba / "Superstition"	7; 8	7; 9	7; 8	Bottom Two
7	Rumba / "Hero"; Rumba Dance Off / "Apologize"	8 Lost	8 This	8 Event	Safe
8	Tango / "Hot n Cold"; Jazz (Trio Challenge) / "Magic"	7; 7	7; 7	7; 7	Eliminated

Dancing with the Stars (Season 17)

For season 17, Murgatroyd was paired with Pretty Little Liars actor Brant Daugherty. They were the sixth couple eliminated on 4 November 2013.

Week #	Dance/song	Judges' score			Result
Week #	Dance/song	Inaba	Goodman	Tonioli	Result
1	Cha-Cha-Cha / "Blurred Lines"	7	8	7	No elimination
2	Rumba / "Underneath Your Clothes"	8	7	8	Safe
3	Quickstep / "Crazy in Love"	9	9	9	Safe
4	Salsa / "Shake Señora"	7	7	7	Last to be called safe
5	Contemporary / "Your Song"	9	9	9	Safe
6	Tango / "The Night Out"; Switch-Up Challenge / Various	9 Awarded	10; 3	9 Points	No elimination
7	Jive / "Tutti Frutti"; Team Freestyle / "The Fox (What Does the Fox Say?)"	9; 10	9; 10	9; 10	Safe
8	Foxtrot / "The Shoop Shoop Song (It's in His Kiss)"; Dance Off / "I Found Someone"	9 Lost	9 The	9 Event	Eliminated

Dancing with the Stars (Season 18)

In 2014, Murgatroyd was again featured as a professional dancer competing on season 18 partnered with Big Time Rush member James Maslow. They made it to the finale but came in fourth place.

Week #	Dance/song	Judges' score				Result
Week #	Dance/song	Inaba	Goodman	Guest^{1}	Tonioli	Result
1	Foxtrot / "Story of My Life"	7	7	—	7	No elimination
2	Salsa / "Follow the Leader"	9	8	—	8	Safe
3	Jive / "The Middle"	9	9	9	9	Safe
4^{2}	Tango / "Dark Horse"	9	8	9	9	No elimination
5	Contemporary / "Let It Go"	10	10	10	10	Safe
6	Quickstep / "You're the One That I Want"	9	8	9	9	Safe
7	Samba / "Gasolina"; Team Freestyle / "The Cup of Life"	9; 8	8; 8	9; 10	9; 9	Last to be called safe
8	Viennese Waltz / "6'2"; Celebrity Dance Duel (Jive) / "Ain't Nothing Wrong with That"	8; 9	9; 10	10; 10	9; 10	Last to be called safe
9 Semifinals	Cha-cha-cha / "Love Never Felt So Good"; Rumba / "Islands in the Stream"	10; 9	10; 9	10; 9	10; 9	Safe
10; Finals	Tango / "Adore You"; Freestyle / "Original Don"	9; 10	10; 9	—	10; 10	Eliminated

^{1}The guest judges were Robin Roberts (Week 3), Julianne Hough (Week 4), Donny Osmond (Week 5), Redfoo (Week 6), Ricky Martin (Week 7), Abby Lee Miller (Week 8) and Kenny Ortega (Week 9).

^{2}For this week only, as part of the "Partner Switch-Up" week, Maslow performed with Cheryl Burke instead of Murgatroyd; Murgatroyd danced a rumba with Olympic ice dancing champion Charlie White, scoring a 33 (7, 8, 9, 9).

Dancing with the Stars (Season 19)

For season 19, Murgatroyd paired with comedian and actor Tommy Chong. The couple made it to the semi-finals, but were then eliminated and finished in 5th place.

Week #	Dance/song	Judges' score				Result
Week #	Dance/song	Inaba	Goodman	J. Hough	Tonioli	Result
1	Cha-cha-cha / "Drop It Like It's Hot"	7	6	7	7	Safe
2	Salsa / "Higher"	7	7	7	7	Safe
3	Argentine Tango / "Por una Cabeza"	8	10^{1}	8	8	Safe
4	Jive / "Jailhouse Rock"	7	7^{2}	7	7	Safe
5^{3}	Mambo / "Pass the Dutchie"	6	6^{4}	5	6	No Eimination
6	Foxtrot / "September"	7	7^{5}	7	7	Safe
7	Quickstep / "That Old Black Magic"; Team Freestyle / "Time Warp"	7; 8	7; 8	7; 8	7; 8	Last to be called safe
8	Paso Doble / "Ring of Fire"; Rumba Dance-Off / "I'm Not the Only One"	6 Awarded	7; 3	7 Extra	6 Points	Last to be called safe
9	Viennese Waltz / "Trouble"; Trio Samba / "Talk Dirty"	7; 7	8; 7	7; 7	7; 7	Safe
10; Semi-finals	Jazz / "Tainted Love"; Rumba / "Tainted Love" (acoustic version)	7; 9	7; 8	7; 9	7; 8	Eliminated

^{1}Week 3 score given by guest judge Kevin Hart in place of Goodman.

^{2}The American public scored the dance in place of Goodman with the averaged score being counted alongside the three other judges.

^{3}This week only, for "Partner Switch-Up" week, Chong performed with Emma Slater instead of Murgatroyd. Murgatroyd performed with Jonathan Bennett.

^{4}Score given by guest judge Jessie J in place of Goodman.

^{5}Score given by guest judge Pitbull in place of Goodman.

Dancing with the Stars (Season 20)

For season 20, Murgatroyd was partnered with football player Michael Sam. The couple was eliminated on Week 4 and finished in 10th place.

Week #	Dance/song	Judges' score				Result
Week #	Dance/song	Inaba	Goodman	J. Hough	Tonioli	Result
1	Cha-cha-cha / "Uptown Funk"	6	6	7	7	No elimination
2	Foxtrot / "Working My Way Back to You"	7	7	7	7	Safe
3	Salsa / "Celebrate"	6	6	6	6	Safe
4	Rumba / "Not My Father's Son"	7	7	8	8	Eliminated

Dancing with the Stars (Season 21)

On 19 August 2015, Good Morning America announced Murgatroyd would be one of the pro dancers on the upcoming season 21 of Dancing with the Stars. However, before the season premiered, Murgatroyd was forced to sit this season out due to an ongoing ankle injury. Murgatroyd told People magazine she had four torn ligaments and a floating piece of bone in her ankle which would require surgery and six to eight weeks of recovery time. Murgatroyd would have been partnered with singer Andy Grammer.

Murgatroyd returned to the show during the season 21 semifinals, performing a salsa trio with Backstreet Boy Nick Carter and Sharna Burgess. The group received a score of 30 for the dance.

Dancing with the Stars (Season 22)

Murgatroyd returned for season 22 and was partnered with deaf model and actor Nyle DiMarco. On 24 May 2016, Murgatroyd and DiMarco were crowned the season's champions.

Murgatroyd did not return for season 23 due to her pregnancy.

Week #	Dance/song	Judges' score			Result
Week #	Dance/song	Inaba	Goodman	Tonioli	Result
1	Cha-cha-cha / "Cake by the Ocean"	8	7	8	No elimination
2	Rumba / "Stole the Show"	7	6	7	Safe
3	Tango / "Verge"	8	8	9	Safe
4	Samba / "Trashin' the Camp"	8	8/9^{1}	9	Safe
5^{2}	Viennese Waltz / "I Get to Love You"	9	10/9^{3}	9	No elimination
6	Quickstep / "Hey Pachuco"	8	8	9	Safe
7	Foxtrot / "Beautiful Day"; Team Freestyle / "Super Bad", "Living in America" & "I Got You (I Feel Good)"	10; 9	9; 9	9; 10	Safe
8	Paso Doble / "Victorious"; Team-up Dance (Argentine Tango) / "Habanera"	10; 10	9; 10	10; 9^{4}	Safe
9 Semi-finals	Trio Jive / "Hit the Road Jack"; Argentine Tango / "Unsteady"	9; 10	9; 10	9; 10	Safe
10; Finals	Quickstep / "S.O.B."; Freestyle / "The Sound of Silence"; Cha-cha-cha & Tango Fusion / "Summer"	9; 10; 10	9; 10; 10	9; 10; 10	Winner

^{1} Score given by guest judge Zendaya.
^{2} For this week only, as part of "America's Switch Up", DiMarco performed with Sharna Burgess instead of Murgatroyd. Murgatroyd performed with Doug Flutie.
^{3} Score given by guest judge Maksim Chmerkovskiy.
^{4} Due to Tonioli being the judge coaching DiMarco's team during the team-up dance, the viewers scored the dance in his place with the averaged score being counted alongside the remaining judges.

Dancing with the Stars (Season 24)

In February 2017, Murgatroyd and her fiancé Maksim Chmerkovskiy announced they would both return. She was partnered with The Bachelor star Nick Viall.

Week #	Dance/Song	Judges' score				Result
Week #	Dance/Song	Inaba	Goodman	J. Hough	Tonioli	Result
1	Cha-cha-cha / "Let Me Love You"	6	6	6	6	No elimination
2	Foxtrot / "Love Me Now"	7	5	7	6	Safe
3	Tango / "Poker Face"	7	6	7	6	Last to be called safe
4	Rumba / "Shape of You"	8	7	8	7	Safe
5	Jazz / "I've Got No Strings"	9	8	9	8	Last to be called safe
6	Jive / "Fun, Fun, Fun"; Team Freestyle / "Dancing Machine", "You Got It (The Right Stuff)" & "Best Song Ever"	7; 8	7; 8	7^{1} 9^{1}	7; 8	Safe
7	Argentine Tango / "Dangerous"; Rumba Dance-Off / "I Will Always Love You"	8 No	8 Additional	9^{2} Scores	9 Given	Eliminated

^{1} Score given by guest judge Nick Carter
^{2} Score given by guest judge Mandy Moore

Dancing with the Stars (Season 25)

Murgatroyd returned once again for season 25 and was paired with 98 Degrees singer Nick Lachey.

Week #	Dance/song	Judges' score			Result
Week #	Dance/song	Inaba	Goodman	Tonioli	Result
1	Cha-cha-cha / "Come Get It Bae"	6	6	6	No elimination
2	Foxtrot / "Mandy"; Argentine Tango / "She's a Lady"	7; 7	6; 6	6; 6	Safe; Last to be called safe
3	Jazz / "Jump (For My Love)"	7	7	7	No elimination
4	Contemporary / "Falling Slowly"	8	7	7	Last to be called safe
5	Quickstep / "The Bare Necessities"	7	8	7	Safe
6	Samba / "Wild Wild West"	7	6, 7^{1}	6	Eliminated

^{1} Score from guest judge Shania Twain.

Dancing with the Stars (Season 28)

Murgatroyd returned to the show after a two-season hiatus and was paired with former basketball player Lamar Odom.

Week #	Dance/song	Judges' score			Result
Week #	Dance/song	Inaba	Goodman	Tonioli	Result
1	Foxtrot / "Feeling Good"	5	3	3	No elimination
2	Salsa / "Con Calma"	4	4	4	Safe
3	Cha-cha-cha / "Old Time Rock and Roll"	4	4	4	Bottom two
4	Viennese Waltz / "Kiss from a Rose"	5	7^{1}/4	4	Eliminated

^{1} Score given by guest judge Leah Remini.

Dancing with the Stars (Season 29)

Murgatroyd returned for season 29 and was paired with former NFL player Vernon Davis.

Week #	Dance/Song	Judges' score			Result
Week #	Dance/Song	Inaba	D. Hough	Tonioli	Result
1	Foxtrot / "All of Me"	5	6	6	No elimination
2	Paso Doble / "We Found Love"	6	6	6	Safe
3	Quickstep / "Be Our Guest"	8	7	7	Safe
4	Rumba / "Let's Stay Together"	8	7	7	Safe
5	Tango / "Livin' on a Prayer"	7	7	7	Bottom two
6	Cha Cha Cha / "Celebration"	7	7	7	Eliminated

Dancing with the Stars (Season 31)

Murgatroyd returned to the show after a one-season hiatus and was paired with actor Jason Lewis. Again, not only were they the first couple eliminated off the show, but also it marked Peta’s earliest exit in the competition.

Week #	Dance/song	Judges' score				Result
Week #	Dance/song	Inaba	Goodman	D. Hough	Tonioli	Result
1	Cha-cha-cha / "Get Lucky"	5	4	4	5	Eliminated

Dancing with the Stars: Live!

In April 2015, it was announced Murgatroyd would take part in the Dancing with the Stars: Live! "Perfect Ten" tour during the summer of 2015. On 25 June 2015 the official Dancing with the Stars Twitter account announced Murgatroyd would be taking a short break from the tour due to an ankle injury.

Murgatroyd again joined the Dancing with the Stars: Live! for the "Dance All Night" tour in winter 2015–2016. The tour was scheduled to stop in 43 cities.

=== Sway: A Dance Trilogy ===
In 2014, Murgatroyd started performing in Sway: A Dance Trilogy in Westbury, New York alongside Maksim Chmerkovskiy. Chmerkovskiy credits his father Sasha with the idea for Sway. Sway is a live ballroom dance show starring Maksim, his brother Valentin, and Tony Dovolani. The show also features Murgatroyd, other professional dancers from Dancing with the Stars and So You think You Can Dance, and dance instructors from Dance with Me studios.

== Personal life ==
Murgatroyd dated Australian professional ballroom dancer and former DWTS cast member Damian Whitewood for five years before breaking up in early 2012.

She had been dating DWTS pro Maksim Chmerkovskiy off and on since 2012. In 2015, Chmerkovskiy confirmed he and Murgatroyd were dating again. Chmerkovskiy and Murgatroyd became engaged on 5 December 2015, when he proposed while onstage for a performance of Sway: A Dance Trilogy in Miami, Florida. Their son, Shai Aleksander, was born on 4 January 2017. The two were married on 8 July 2017 at Oheka Castle in Long Island, New York. In June 2022, Murgatroyd revealed that she suffered three miscarriages between 2020 and 2021 and that she was undergoing in vitro fertilization to try to have another child. In early 2023, it was revealed that she was pregnant with the couple's second child after experiencing a natural conception. On 18 June 2023, she gave birth to another boy, Rio John.

On 5 February 2024 she announced she was pregnant with her third child. Milan Maksim was born on July 12, 2024.

On 10 October 2019, she was sworn in as a US citizen.
