= The Friar's Club =

- Seinfeld episode
- Episode no.: Season 7 Episode 18
- Directed by: Andy Ackerman
- Written by: David Mandel
- Production code: 718
- Original air date: March 7, 1996

Guest appearances
- Rob Schneider as Bob; Heidi Swedberg as Susan Ross; Lisa Kushell as Connie; Samantha Smith as Hallie; John O'Hurley as Peterman; Pat Cooper as himself; Robert Martin Robinson as Maitre D'; Norman Large as Detective; Peggy Lane as Waitress; The Flying Karamazov Brothers as the Flying Sandos Brothers; Phil Morris as Jackie Chiles

Episode chronology
| ← Previous "The Doll" | Next → "The Wig Master" |
- Seinfeld season 7

"The Friar's Club" is the 128th episode of the NBC sitcom Seinfeld. This is the 18th episode for the seventh season, originally airing on March 7, 1996. In this episode, Jerry struggles to return a borrowed jacket to the New York Friars Club, George plans for himself and Jerry to marry into each other's company, Elaine suspects her new coworker is selectively deaf, and Kramer adopts an extreme sleep schedule.

== Plot ==
George dances in the streets because caterer scheduling has postponed his wedding once more to June. Meanwhile, Susan's best friend Hallie is newly single, and George realizes that he can see Jerry all the time if Jerry and Hallie get together. Since Pat Cooper is sponsoring Jerry to join the Friars Club, they all go for dinner; to meet the dress code, Jerry borrows a suit jacket with a crest. Jerry decides that he likes Hallie, despite talking to George instead of her over dinner.

Kramer starts sleeping 20 minutes every three hours, planning to become as productive as da Vinci. Instead, awake with nothing to do all night, he becomes a nuisance to Jerry. He is also dating Connie, a woman who will only see him at home.

Elaine's new coworker, Bob, uses a hearing aid. Bob gets a large workload, but makes J. Peterman repeat his assignment until he gives up and dumps it on Elaine. Stuck working late, Elaine wants to test if Bob is really deaf; Jerry fails to surprise Bob from behind at a urinal, but still cannot be sure.

Hallie gets everyone tickets to the Flying Sandos Brothers at the Friars Club; Jerry, having accidentally worn their jacket home, brings it back. However, one of the Brothers takes the jacket for their comedy routine, and Jerry cannot find him afterwards. Hallie promises to get the jacket back, but Jerry thinks she is not serious, and "sours" on her. George is desperate for Jerry to "sweeten" again, since he has nothing to talk about while alone with Susan.

Sleep-deprived, Kramer falls dead asleep while making out, pinning Connie under him. Fearing her mobster boyfriend catching her with a dead man, Connie calls his associates to dispose of the body. Kramer wakes up in horror after being dumped into the Hudson River.

Elaine tests Bob by calling lustfully to him, but only succeeds in getting noticed by Peterman, who sends her and Bob on a date to see the Sandos Brothers. He warns that he could fire her if she had been taunting the deaf. At the show, Bob inexplicably thrusts himself across Elaine; she shoos him away, only to find he was getting his dropped hearing aid.

Back at the club, Jerry owes $800 for the jacket, and has humiliated Cooper to boot. Jerry and George finally spot the Sandos Brother, wearing a crested jacket, but cannot enter the club. Unaware this is the wrong jacket, they take it from him by force backstage; Hallie, arriving with the correct jacket, is repulsed by their bullying. The Brothers chase them off through the emergency exit, setting off alarms. Elaine, testing Bob's hearing aid, learns painfully that it is real.

Kramer has Connie arrested for attempted murder. Her lawyer, Jackie Chiles, hangs up on her rather than deal with Kramer again.

== Production ==
Writer David Mandel got the idea for the Bob Grossberg story from a boy he knew in high school who wore a hearing aid and would pretend that he couldn't hear whenever he was asked a question he didn't know the answer to. Rob Schneider was the first person to come to Mandel's mind for the part of Grossberg, since he had worked with Schneider on Saturday Night Live and had unsuccessfully tried to cast him as Ramon in "The Pool Guy".

The scenes at the Flying Sandos Brothers shows were filmed at the Orpheum Theatre. Kramer waking up inside the Hudson River was filmed in a Universal Studios water tank, with weights loaded inside the burlap sack to make it sink as rapidly as it would be expected to if dropped from the bridge over the river. Due to the dangerous nature of the stunt, Michael Richards was given a small oxygen mask which he concealed inside his clothes, and two professional scuba divers were present in the tank. Richards, a certified diver, did not need the oxygen mask in either of the scene's two takes.

Jerry and George's dialogue about being "soured" and "sweetening" was added by Seinfeld creators Larry David and Jerry Seinfeld.

The script for "The Friar's Club" was extremely long even by Seinfeld standards, so numerous sequences had to be removed during editing. The opening scene (in which Susan tells George about the wedding delay and Hallie's breakup) and the ending scene (in which Peterman, after hearing Bob complain about the date, rebukes Elaine and sends Bob on a trip to Italy that he'd originally intended for her) were both cut in their entirety. Other sequences which were filmed but deleted include Peterman telling Elaine the story of how he fornicated with an ugly beekeeper, a much longer take of the double date during which Pat Cooper approaches Jerry, and George and Susan discussing how well Jerry and Hallie are getting along.
