= The Cadillac =

- Seinfeld episodes
- Episode nos.: Season 7 Episodes 14/15
- Directed by: Andy Ackerman
- Written by: Larry David; Jerry Seinfeld
- Production code: 714/715
- Original air date: February 8, 1996
- Running time: 42 minutes

Guest appearances
- Barney Martin as Morty Seinfeld; Liz Sheridan as Helen Seinfeld; Heidi Swedberg as Susan Ross; Walter Olkewicz as Nick; Annabelle Gurwitch as Katy; Marisa Tomei as herself; Sandy Baron as Jack Klompus; Frances Bay as Mabel Choate; Ann Morgan Guilbert as Evelyn; Bill Macy as Herb; Jesse White as Ralph; Annie Korzen as Doris; Daniel Zacapa as Power Guy; Golde Starger as Bldg 'A'; Janice Davies as Bldg 'B'; Art Frankel as Bldg 'C'

Episode chronology
← Previous "The Seven"	Next → "The Shower Head"
- Seinfeld season 7

"The Cadillac" is an hour-long, two-part episode of the NBC sitcom Seinfeld. It was the 124th and 125th episode and 14th and 15th episode for the seventh season. It aired on February 8, 1996. This was the last episode to be co-written by Jerry Seinfeld.

In this episode, Jerry draws unwanted attention to himself and his parents by buying them a Cadillac sedan; Kramer makes a cable guy feel his own customers' pain; and George drags Elaine into setting him up with Marisa Tomei behind Susan's back. Tomei guest-stars as herself.

== Plot ==
=== Part 1 ===
The lucrative pay from Jerry's latest gig makes Kramer see him in a new light, and lets Jerry buy his father the fully-featured Cadillac sedan of his dreams. Elaine's friend Katy remarks that she could have introduced George to Marisa Tomei, who likes quirky and bald men, if not for his engagement. Starstruck, George will not let this chance go; even as Elaine disapproves and Katy gets hospitalized under intensive care, he pesters them to set him up. He marathons Tomei's movies while fantasizing her in his arms, and hides his infatuation from Susan.

A cable guy is waiting to be let into Kramer's apartment to cut off free premium channels. Kramer, nursing an old grudge over cable guys with freewheeling schedules making him wait all day, realizes that the tables have turned. Day after day, he relishes hiding from the cable guy and outsmarting him in games of cat and mouse.

Seeing that Jerry has Cadillac money, Elaine cozies up to him. In Florida, Morty's delight at the Cadillac draws sour grapes from Jack Klompus, who accuses him, as condo association president, of embezzling funds for the car. Driven by petty feuds, half of the condo board moves to impeach Morty. To avoid expulsion from the condo, the Seinfelds must win over board member Mabel Choate, who holds the tiebreaking vote.

=== Part 2 ===
In the middle of the night, Elaine affectionately calls Jerry and offers to join him in Florida. With Jerry away, George needs Elaine as his alibi for meeting Tomei behind Susan's back, but Elaine cannot gel with how George "works" as they get their stories straight. Mabel turns out to be the victim of Jerry's marble rye robbery back in New York, so Jerry gets out of dodge before she can recognize him.

Tomei is indeed charmed by George's quirkiness and baldness, but, affronted that he was engaged all along, punches him and storms off. The cable guy tails Kramer, setting off a thrilling chase across the city; leaping across rooftops, Kramer finally escapes. Jerry refuses to go to an early bird dinner just to save money like all the condo retirees, causing Jack to call out the Seinfelds for ostentatiously eating at normal hours.

George and Elaine agree that she is getting his advice about "Art Vandelay", her "importer-exporter" boyfriend, but this comes off as a secret affair in its own right. Confronted by Susan, Elaine is forced to make up Art's import-export markets. George misses Elaine's frantic calls afterwards, and fails to corroborate her story to Susan. He gets punched again and kicked out.

Morty secures Mabel's vote against impeachment before the board meeting but at the meeting, when the vote comes up, Jack calls Mabel an "old bag" just as Jerry did while robbing her. Mabel remembers Jerry at last, and turns the board against Morty. Jack succeeds him as president.

Humbled by tasting his own medicine, the cable guy renounces the elusiveness of his colleagues, and vows to visit customers by appointment; he and Kramer embrace in heartfelt reconciliation. The disgraced Seinfelds stoically drive off in the Cadillac as their neighbors look on.

== Production ==
The inspiration for the episode came when Larry David bought a Lexus for his father, who was president of his condominium in Florida, and started wondering what the other residents would think of him having a Lexus. Like most of Seinfeld's one-hour time slot episodes, "The Cadillac" was initially conceived as a normal half-hour show. The original script was filmed on January 10, and ran well over the 23 minutes allotted for a half-hour time slot. While this was not unusual for Seinfeld, in this case Larry David and Jerry Seinfeld decided it would be easier to pad the episode out to a one-hour time slot than edit it down to a half hour, so they wrote a number of additional scenes, such as those dealing with the early bird special. The additional scenes, and extended reworkings of existing scenes, were filmed on February 1.

Jerry Seinfeld was a longtime fan of Jesse White, who plays Ralph in the episode, due to his part on The Ann Sothern Show. White gave him his autograph when he was a young boy. The role would become White's final performance before his death in 1997.

The chase sequence with Kramer and the cable guy include shots which were filmed in the real New York City with body doubles, and uses stock music from the earlier episode "The Doorman". These scenes reference Vertigo.

The episode's final scene, showing the Seinfelds leaving the condo, is a shot-for-shot parody of the movie Nixon.

== Critical reception ==
David Sims of The A.V. Club praised the deep politics of the retirement condo story but said the George/Marisa subplot "wraps up too quickly with George just getting his comeuppance from both ladies with none of his usual deviousness."
