= The Caddy (Seinfeld) =

- Seinfeld episode
- Episode no.: Season 7 Episode 12
- Directed by: Andy Ackerman
- Written by: Gregg Kavet & Andy Robin
- Production code: 712
- Original air date: January 25, 1996

Guest appearances
- Jerry Stiller as Frank Costanza; Estelle Harris as Estelle Costanza; Heidi Swedberg as Susan Ross; Brenda Strong as Sue Ellen; Phil Morris as Jackie Chiles; Richard Herd as Wilhelm; John O'Hurley as Peterman; Armin Shimerman as Stan; Arthur Rosenberg as Judge; Cynthia Madvig as Woman #1; Marilyn Tokuda as Woman #2; Lee Bear as George Steinbrenner (uncredited); Larry David as George Steinbrenner (voice) (uncredited)

Episode chronology
← Previous "The Rye"	Next → "The Seven"
- Seinfeld season 7

"The Caddy" is the 122nd episode of the NBC sitcom Seinfeld. This was the 12th episode for the seventh season, originally airing on January 25, 1996. In this episode, George stands to earn a promotion because he cannot move his car, Elaine's "braless wonder" archenemy Sue Ellen Mischke reenters her life, and Kramer lets his caddy Stan call the shots for more than just golf.

== Plot ==
Kramer's caddy, Stan, lets him into a golf course during winter closure, and trains him up as a contender to go pro, earning his trust. Elaine runs into Sue Ellen Mischke, heiress to the Oh Henry! candy bar fortune and her nemesis since childhood. Elaine recounts how Sue Ellen, who has gone braless all her life, could turn her own boyfriend's head effortlessly.

George locks the keys in his car at Yankee Stadium. After days of seeing George's car ever-present, Mr. Wilhelm and George Steinbrenner credit him as a tireless worker, making him frontrunner for promotion to assistant to the general manager. With the car now his greatest asset at work, George realizes he does not need to be there. He takes off with Susan to her father's rebuilt cabin, while planning to trade for his Yankees dream team as the GM's right-hand man.

Sue Ellen impudently asks Elaine for a birthday gift, and she sends a bra as an insult. Unfazed, Sue Ellen brazenly shows off the bra uncovered. George sends Jerry to clear off windshield flyers piling up on his car; Jerry brings Kramer, and they find the car also covered in conspicuous bird droppings. Kramer breaks into the car and gets it washed, but then drives past Sue Ellen, whose exposed bra turns Kramer's head and makes him crash.

Kramer injures his shoulder, ending his pro career before it begins. Elaine vindictively urges him to take Sue Ellen to court for her deep pockets. With Stan's approval, Kramer goes back to Jackie Chiles, who pounces on the case, smelling blood. While Kramer is out, Sue Ellen meets Jerry and seduces him; Kramer, finding an Oh Henry! wrapper in Jerry's trash, realizes he has turned hostile witness.

Jerry has no choice but to return George's car to the stadium. The abandoned, bloody wreck sets off a futile search for the missing George; Steinbrenner summarily writes him off as dead, and personally notifies the Costanzas. Jerry learns all this and calls George back to the office; George claims that he was helplessly laying in a ditch, only to learn that, being presumed dead, he was passed over for the promotion and will also get pay docked.

In court, Jackie presents a bra identical to Sue Ellen's, then squeezes the truth out of Jerry in cross-examination. Kramer, trusting Stan's strategy over Jackie's, makes Sue Ellen wear the bra in court. He fails to foresee that it cannot fit over her clothes "like a glove", sabotaging his victory.

To Elaine's dismay, Peterman assigns her to sell Sue Ellen's bra top as a flapper-themed garment, causing it to catch on with her coworkers.

== Production ==
The character Tom Cosley, from the flashback to Elaine's high school days, was named after a high school boyfriend of Elaine actress Julia Louis-Dreyfus.

Phil Morris was surprised that his character Jackie Chiles was being used in another episode, later commenting, "I mean, how often can they bring an attorney into this mix?" Like the season six episode "The Big Salad", the Chiles plot thread satirizes the murder trial of O. J. Simpson, in particular the prosecution asking Simpson to try on the gloves used in the murder.

Jerry Seinfeld later said that Frank Costanza's phone message ("Jerry, it's Frank Costanza. Mr. Steinbrenner's here. George is dead. Call me back.") is one of his favorite lines in the entire series.
