= Jackie Chiles =

Fictional character portrayed by American actor Phil Morris in the NBC sitcom Seinfeld

- Seinfeld character
- Jackie Chiles in "The Maestro".
- First appearance: "The Maestro" (1995)
- Last appearance: "The Finale Part II" (1998)
- Created by: Jerry Seinfeld and Larry David
- Based on: Johnnie Cochran
- Portrayed by: Phil Morris

In-universe information
- Gender: Male
- Occupation: Attorney at law

Jackie Chiles is a fictional character portrayed by American actor Phil Morris in the NBC sitcom Seinfeld. A parody of Johnnie Cochran, he appears in the series' seventh through ninth seasons as Cosmo Kramer's lawyer.

== Character ==
Chiles is a parody of famed attorney Johnnie Cochran; both are bespectacled, mustachioed, well-dressed, African American lawyers with the same initials and penchants for grandiose vocabulary. According to the diplomas in his office, Chiles attended Dartmouth College and Stanford Law School. Morris also emulates Cochran's distinctive enunciation and delivery. After appearing in several episodes during the series' later years, Chiles, along with many other minor characters from the show's past, appeared again in the program's finale and was crucial in failing to achieve acquittal of the characters on charges of violating a duty to rescue law. Jackie's catchphrase is saying several adjectives in succession for added emphasis, such as "lewd, lascivious, salacious, outrageous!"

Morris also planned to star as Chiles in a spin-off, but the pilot never came to fruition. NBC executives have claimed that a pilot was never discussed with them.

According to Morris, the real-life Cochran told him he enjoyed his appearances as Chiles on Seinfeld. However, after appearing in character as Chiles in advertisements for the Honda Odyssey and Diet Dr Pepper in 2000, Morris received a cease and desist letter from Cochran's law office due to the impact his unflattering mimicry of Cochran might have on his legal career. Following Cochran's death, Morris reprised the character again in 2010 for Will Ferrell's Funny or Die website, in 2022 for a Snyder's of Hanover commercial, and again in 2025 for the music video of Ice Nine Kills's "The Laugh Track".

== Appearances ==
- Season Seven:
  - "The Maestro" – Kramer sneaks a cafe latte into a movie theatre and burns himself while trying to climb over the legs of another patron – a satire of the 1994 lawsuit Liebeck v. McDonald's Restaurants. Jackie describes having to sneak the coffee in as a violation of Kramer's rights as a consumer: "It's outrageous, egregious, preposterous." Kramer uses a balm to treat his burn, causing it to be healed. Furthermore, the coffee company offers a settlement of a lifetime of free coffee at all of their stores throughout North America and Europe. Kramer accepts the offer before the executive had finished speaking and mentioned any money, much to Jackie's dismay.
  - "The Caddy" – Jackie sues Oh Henry! candy bar heiress Sue Ellen Mischke for allegedly causing Kramer personal injury due to an automobile accident. Kramer distracts Jerry while driving when he sees Mischke walking the streets of New York City wearing only a bra. Chiles describes her actions as "lewd, lascivious, salacious, outrageous!" The lawsuit fails when Kramer, taking the ill advice of his golf caddy, demands she try on the bra to prove it is hers. It fails to fit because she tries donning it over a leotard. Jackie yells at Kramer, "Of course a bra's not going to fit on over a leotard. A bra's got to fit right up against a person's skin... like a glove!" – an obvious parody of the O. J. Simpson murder case.
  - "The Friar's Club" – Kramer's experiment with polyphasic sleep causes him to fall asleep during a make-out session. His Italian girlfriend thinks he has died and gets some friends to dump him in the Hudson River. When he comes to, Kramer accuses her of trying to murder him. She calls her lawyer, Jackie Chiles. Upon hearing that Kramer is involved, however, Jackie declares, "I don't want nothing to do with it!"
- Season Eight:
  - "The Abstinence" – Kramer's face ages prematurely when he turns his apartment into a smoking lounge. Kramer consults with Jackie about filing suit against the tobacco companies for his disfigurement. Jackie describes Kramer's face as "sallow, unattractive, disgusting." When Kramer asks if he has a case, Jackie's reply is "Your face is my case." Jackie and Kramer then meet with a tobacco company lawyer, who alleges that Kramer's face gives him a sense of "rugged masculinity." Jackie replies, "Rugged? The man's a goblin. He's been exposed to smoke for four days. By the time this case gets to trial, he'll be nothing more than a shrunken head." After the lawyer says she will have an offer to settle out of court the next morning, Jackie tells Kramer, "Jackie's cashing in on your wretched disfigurement." Kramer settles the case without Jackie's knowledge for a Marlboro Man style billboard in Times Square featuring his own face. Jackie dubs this "the most public yet of my many humiliations."
  - "The Comeback" – Although Jackie does not appear in the episode, Kramer reveals to Jerry that Chiles has put a restraining order on him, barring him from coming within 200 feet of his office. Kramer goes on to explain that because of this, he could not give Jackie a Christmas gift.
- Season Nine:
  - "The Finale" – Jackie represents George, Elaine, Jerry and Kramer when they violate the Good Samaritan law. Despite losing the case, he gets some satisfaction in sleeping with Sidra (from "The Implant"), which would have been more satisfying if the jury had not reached a decision so quickly. His last line in the series is the same as Sidra's line about her breasts from the aforementioned episode: "And by the way, they're real, and they're spectacular!"

== Imitations ==
In 2024 and 2025, a television commercial for Allied Injury Group, a personal injury law firm, featured comedian Shaun Jones portraying a Jackie Chiles-like character.

== See also ==
- List of Seinfeld characters
