= The Secret Code (Seinfeld) =

- Seinfeld episode
- Episode no.: Season 7 Episode 7
- Directed by: Andy Ackerman
- Written by: Alec Berg & Jeff Schaffer
- Production code: 707
- Original air date: November 9, 1995

Guest appearances
- Heidi Swedberg as Susan Ross; John O'Hurley as Peterman; Wayne Tippit as Captain; Lewis Arquette as Leapin' Larry; Fred Stoller as Fred Yerkes; Ellen Albertini Dow as Momma; David St. James as Doctor; Michael Tuckerman as Man; Von L. Roddy as Desota; Karen Lorshbough as Relative; Leesa Bryte as Secretary

Episode chronology
← Previous "The Soup Nazi"	Next → "The Pool Guy"
- Seinfeld season 7

"The Secret Code" is the 117th episode of the NBC sitcom Seinfeld. This was the seventh episode of the seventh season. It aired on November 9, 1995. In this episode, the secrecy of George's ATM code is pushed to its limit, Elaine dates a depressing man because he cannot remember her, Jerry's foot falls asleep at the wrong time, and Kramer tries to play fireman.

== Plot ==
Because his ATM passcode must be kept secret, George will not share it even with Susan despite their engagement. Jerry gets George to concede that he could make an exception to save someone's life, but cannot imagine a plausible scenario. Elaine is fascinated that a depressing man named Fred can remember every detail of a party except having met her there. Kramer, tuning into an emergency radio scanner, recalls his childhood dream to drive the back of a tiller truck as a fireman, and claims that his driving directions could have saved a building that burned down.

Jerry gets an offer to film commercials for "Leapin' Larry"'s appliance store, but Jerry's foot falls asleep during their meeting. Staggering about, Jerry offends Larry by making a mockery of his one-leggedness. Elaine dreads being regaled with her boss Peterman's globetrotting exploits over dinner, and begs Jerry to suffer with her. Jerry tricks George into coming along, but Elaine stands them up to go out with Fred instead, only to get stood up herself.

Uncharacteristically, only George cannot think of an excuse to leave, forcing him to endure Peterman's stories. Peterman gives George a ride, but makes an urgent detour to keep vigil at his mother's deathbed, leaving George stuck with him overnight. Needing to unburden himself of his secret code ("Bosco"), George tells Peterman's mother so she can take it to her grave. Instead, she recites "Bosco" in agitation as her last words. Later, Kramer, knowing George well, gets uncomfortably close to deducing that his code must be whichever chocolate syrup brand he favors.

Perplexed by "Bosco", Peterman invites George to his mother's funeral to help ponder this mystery. His duplicity deserting him, George only manages a feeble excuse even as Elaine bails for another date with Fred. Having realized that, perversely, she only likes Fred because he cannot remember her, she finally sees him for his dismal self. Jerry resolves his misunderstanding with Larry, but his foot falls asleep again at the store, causing him to knock over some paint thinner and spark a fire.

Kramer presents his compendium of driving shortcuts to the local firehouse. They reject his radical ideas, but he sets out to prove himself when a truck is dispatched to Leapin' Larry's. Sliding down the fire pole, he incapacitates the truck's rear driver, then takes his place. Not knowing how to steer, Kramer crashes the truck.

The fire forces evacuation of the whole block, including the funeral, but a bank customer is trapped behind a jammed door with his sleeve caught in an ATM. Thinking fast, Peterman demands George's bank card and code to operate the ATM. George fails to lie his way out as a crowd looks on.

George's code becomes public knowledge, while Peterman writes George into his catalog as a scoundrel who killed his mother.

== Production ==
The inspiration for the Elaine/Fred plot was Jerry Seinfeld's practice of always saying "Nice to see you" instead of "Nice to meet you." Seinfeld had explained to writers Alec Berg and Jeff Schaffer that "Nice to see you" is acceptable even if one has never met the other person before, while "Nice to meet you" is seen as offensive if they have previously met.

In this episode J. Peterman's complete first name, Jacopo, is revealed, more explicitly differentiating him from the J. Peterman Company's real-life founder, John Peterman. Berg and Schaffer named the character after their local pizzeria, Jacopo's.

Seinfeld writer Spike Feresten had a police scanner; the Seinfeld crew enjoyed listening to the conversations and eventually acquired their own for the offices, inspiring the episode's Kramer story. The scenes at the fire station were filmed on location. The fire truck Kramer rides would not fit on the show's sound stage, so the crew put it on a New York street with a large blue screen suspended behind actor Michael Richards, whose body movements combined with the inserted moving background to create the illusion that the fire truck was in motion. A few shots from the scene were filmed on location by a second unit with a Michael Richards stunt double actually riding a moving fire truck.

Kramer was scripted to call Jerry "S1Banga", a fictional player name from a soccer video game published by Sega, but Michael Richards tripped over the name and said "Munjamba" instead. Berg and Schaffer decided not to demand another take since "S1Banga" was an inside joke and they were confident viewers would find Richards' version just as funny. In an original Table Draft script from Oct 6th,1995 the original Secret Code was "Fritos" not "Bosco".
