= Lorna Thompson =

Lorna Thompson may refer to:

- Lorna Thompson, fictional character in Cuckoo (TV series)
- Lorna Thompson, fictional character in Murder, She Wrote, played by Heidi Swedberg
- Lorna Thompson, fictional character in We Are Monsters, played by Maisie Williams
