= The Wig Master =

- Seinfeld episode
- Episode no.: Season 7 Episode 19
- Directed by: Andy Ackerman
- Written by: Spike Feresten
- Production code: 719
- Original air date: April 4, 1996

Guest appearances
- Heidi Swedberg as Susan Ross; Patrick Bristow as Wig Master; Michael McDonald as Jesse; Harry Van Gorkum as Craig Stewart; Gina Mastrogiacomo as Prostitute; Kim Chase as Charmaine; Chaim Jeraffi as Jiffy Park Guy; Pamela Dillman as Salesperson; Zack Phifer as Bob; Shashi Bhatia as Flower Girl; Norman Brenner as Ian

Episode chronology
← Previous "The Friar's Club"	Next → "The Calzone"
- Seinfeld season 7

"The Wig Master" is the 129th episode of the NBC situation comedy Seinfeld. This is the 19th episode for the seventh season, originally airing on April 4, 1996. In this episode, Elaine waits for a discounted dress as a perk of dating a salesman; Jerry wants to be mistaken for someone else's significant other; and George and Kramer get what they pay for at a low-rent parking lot.

== Plot ==
Jerry lets a salesman nearly sell him a crested blazer, but backs out with the flimsy excuse that he needs a second opinion. Seeing the salesman's doubt, Jerry goes back with Elaine just to prove him wrong. Instead, Elaine gets charmed by the salesman, Craig, and giddily endorses the blazer. Jerry leaves with the unwanted purchase and the humiliation of Craig assuming he is not Elaine's boyfriend, despite her picking out his clothes.

George is uneasy at Susan's friend Ethan, a theatrical wig master, staying over with his wig collection while touring with Joseph and the Amazing Technicolor Dreamcoat. George is also leaving his car at a very cheap parking lot, and Kramer joins in despite needing a ride just to get there. At Kramer's behest, George gets him a backstage tour of Joseph.

To Jerry's dismay, Craig gets mistaken for Elaine's husband over Jerry. Craig offers Elaine store discounts, so she picks out a Nicole Miller dress. Jerry assumes he is stringing her along, and Craig gives excuses for the dress being slow to restock. However, Elaine trusts Craig because he offers the same perks to a male friend.

George finds a condom in his car, then notices prostitutes at the parking lot. George pays a prostitute to ask her if she is working out of the parked cars, just as Susan arrives; Susan ends up trusting that he was innocent, but he realizes too late that he should have undermined her trust to jeopardize their wedding. The parking lot misplaces Kramer's car key, and his apartment key with it, but Kramer is happy to drive someone else's Mary Kay pink Cadillac Eldorado, and impose on Jerry as a roommate. Kramer demands to use Jerry's bed, and makes Jerry go to bed early with him. Elaine hands off a gaudy walking stick from work to Kramer.

George wants out of the parking lot, only to find that his deposit was non-refundable, and that his car is blocked in for days behind other cars. Jerry returns the blazer, openly admitting that he wants to spite Craig, but the store does not accept this reason, or his backpedaling. At lunch, Ethan tells Elaine that wig makers pay premiums for real hair, then everyone leaves except Ethan and Jerry; a man asks Ethan out, causing Jerry to take offense at not being mistaken for Ethan's boyfriend.

While Craig is asleep, Elaine answers a call from his boss, and learns the dress had been in stock all along. She suddenly realizes that Craig's hair, a long ponytail, will fetch good money.

After seeing the technicolor dreamcoat backstage, Kramer borrows a copy from the wardrobe. Out one night, he finds a lost felt hat and adds it to his flamboyant coat and walking stick ensemble. At the lot, he finds a prostitute in his car, starting a fight just as police arrive. He is stereotyped as a pimp and arrested.

== Production ==
The episode was inspired by the time writer Spike Feresten's live-in girlfriend had her wig master friend as a house guest. Feresten recalled, "He ended up staying for two days, and I made his life a living hell. And he left." Feresten also once took his car to a discount parking lot. His car door would not lock, and when he picked it up he found discarded condoms inside; it turned out that prostitutes had been operating in the car.

The cafe scenes were filmed outside the CBS Studio Center commissary on February 27, 1996. At the beginning of the second one Ethan was scripted to be talking about George and Susan: "How could you love a guy like George? He's a mess." Actor Patrick Bristow said "like that" instead of "like George", making the line more ambiguous. Filming of the parking lot scenes on the same day was plagued by rain, and they were re-shot on March 19.

The ending of George's story was cut: without his car, George breaks his promise to drive Susan. In disbelief, she calls him a liar, so George eagerly starts vacating her home even though she immediately calms down. In another cut scene, Jerry is met with indifference as he shows off the crested blazer to total strangers, even as Kenny Bania, wearing the same blazer, catches a woman's eye.

== In the legal world ==
The clothing store's policy of not allowing purchases to be returned for the sake of denying a sales clerk his commission was cited in Clancy v. King (Maryland Court of Appeals, No. 112, 26 August 2008).
