= The Shower Head =

- Seinfeld episode
- Episode no.: Season 7 Episode 16
- Directed by: Andy Ackerman
- Written by: Peter Mehlman & Marjorie Gross
- Production code: 715
- Original air date: February 15, 1996
- Running time: 21 minutes

Guest appearances
- Wayne Knight as Newman; Jerry Stiller as Frank Costanza; Estelle Harris as Estelle Costanza; Barney Martin as Morty Seinfeld; Liz Sheridan as Helen Seinfeld; Len Lesser as Uncle Leo; Jay Leno as himself; John O'Hurley as Peterman; Ron West as Dr. Strugatz; Tim DeZarn as Salesman; Michelle Bonilla as Waitress

Episode chronology
| ← Previous "The Cadillac" | Next → "The Doll" |
- Seinfeld season 7

"The Shower Head" is the 126th episode of the NBC sitcom Seinfeld. This is the sixteenth episode for the seventh season. It aired on February 15, 1996. It had 32.3 million US viewers. In this episode, Jerry needs to hasten his parents' return to Florida, which George jeopardizes by having his parents follow suit; Elaine cannot pass a urine test for work; and Kramer's showers are spoiled by low-flow showerheads.

== Plot ==
Still feeling the sting of being forced to change condos in Florida, Jerry's parents put off their move to the Del Boca Vista complex. Thanks to Uncle Leo living with his girlfriend Lydia, his apartment in New York is vacant for their use. With his parents now too close for comfort, Jerry must disrupt this arrangement to reestablish his "buffer zone". He glibly tempts Leo to become a swinging bachelor.

Elaine must get medical clearance for a work trip to Africa to visit the Maasai people, but opium is found in her urine sample. New low-flow showerheads are installed in Jerry's building, leaving everyone's hair still sudsy after showering. Unable to recognize himself, Kramer is frantic to shower properly. With Elaine failing the urine test twice, and Kramer in her office begging for a fix, Peterman pegs her as an addict in denial, and fires her.

George, realizing that nothing is keeping his parents in New York, entices them to move far away to Del Boca Vista. With Jerry invited to The Tonight Show with Jay Leno, the Costanzas encounter the Seinfelds backstage. Morty claims that there are no vacancies in Del Boca Vista; Frank is enraged by this transparent ploy to keep him out. On TV, Jerry jokes about how Uncle Leo blames antisemitism for every inconvenience; Lydia's amusement at this, at Leo's expense, makes them break up.

Leo forces the Seinfelds to vacate for Florida, while the Costanzas resolve to move to Florida to spite the Seinfelds. Jerry and George ecstatically celebrate their freedom. However, Frank calls Morty, vowing to get underfoot at Del Boca Vista at every turn. The Seinfelds stay put in New York with Jerry to preserve their own buffer zone—leaving Jerry with none, to his horror. Elaine figures out that poppyseed muffins from Monk's were detected in her urine; she books a third test to clear her name, but then eats some leftover chicken with poppy seeds. With no time left, Elaine gets a clean urine sample from Helen in one of Jerry's glasses.

Jerry demoralizes Leo so he will go back to Lydia in desperation, vacating his apartment again, but low-flow showerheads get installed just as the Seinfelds move back in. The Seinfelds finally leave for Florida when the Costanzas back out to stay with George. Elaine's urine test clears her to get rehired, but also diagnoses her as too geriatric to go to Africa. With Kramer reduced to taking a bath in disgust, Newman hooks him up with "black market showerheads" from Yugoslavia, and they both splurge for forbidden elephant-washing nozzles. Later, in the shower, Kramer can only flail against an unyielding jet of water until he tumbles out.

== Production ==
Low-flow showerheads being installed in Jerry's apartment was one of the first story ideas episode co-writer Peter Mehlman submitted for Seinfeld, back in 1991. A scene showing Jerry trying out his own new high-pressure showerhead, a companion to the end scene with Kramer, was filmed but deleted before broadcast.
