= The Seven =

- Seinfeld episode
- Episode no.: Season 7 Episode 13
- Directed by: Andy Ackerman
- Written by: Alec Berg & Jeff Schaffer
- Production code: 713
- Original air date: February 1, 1996

Guest appearances
- Wayne Knight as Newman; Heidi Swedberg as Susan Ross; Ken Hudson Campbell as Ken; Shannon Holt as Carrie; Lisa Deanne Young as Christie; Charles Emmett as Orderly; David Richards as Maitre D'; Matthew McCurley as Kid; Joshua Abrasion as Man #1; Steve Artiaga as Man #2; Cheryl Hunter as Woman

Episode chronology
← Previous "The Caddy"	Next → "The Cadillac"
- Seinfeld season 7

"The Seven" is the 123rd episode of the NBC sitcom Seinfeld. This was the 13th episode for the seventh season, originally airing on February 1, 1996. In this episode, Kramer wants a girls' bike from Elaine in return for fixing her neck pain, another couple steals George's plan to use a jersey number as a baby name, and Jerry must find out how his date is wearing the same dress every day.

== Plot ==
At a vintage toy store, Elaine finds a girls' bike she always wanted, while Jerry meets Christie, a woman in a striking black-and-white dress. Jerry ignores Elaine's struggle to get the bike off a wall, even as it falls on her. George meets Susan's expectant cousin Carrie and her husband Ken; George conceitedly shoots down all their baby girl names in favor of his own idea, "Soda". Kramer wastes Jerry's food making a sandwich not to his own liking, and is reminded that Jerry gets nothing in return for his freeloading.

Plagued by neck pain from getting the bike, Elaine declares that a cure would be worth giving up the bike. Kramer's dubious shiatsu technique instantly relieves her pain, leaving her unexpectedly on the hook. Kramer also voluntarily keeps a ledger to reimburse Jerry for food. George has his heart set on naming his firstborn "Seven", after Mickey Mantle's jersey number; Susan refuses, while Jerry mocks George.

Jerry notifies Kramer that he cannot leave food half-eaten to avoid paying full price. Kramer guilts Elaine into making good on her promise, but the next day, her pain returns worse than before. Kramer, flaunting the cutesy bike, will not give it back, blaming Elaine for not knowing esoteric shiatsu aftercare. Jerry refuses to take sides, and sends them to Newman, who has no affection for anyone, to arbitrate.

Carrie and Ken, as fellow Mantle fans, take the name "Seven" for themselves. George confronts them to keep the name's "cachet" to himself, just as Carrie goes into labor. Rushing to the hospital, the couple has as little sympathy for George as he does for their ordeal. George is not allowed into the delivery room, shutting out his pitiful pleading.

Christie wears the same dress again on every date, baffling Jerry. Bent on catching her in different clothes, he accompanies her home mid-date to change. Spotting the same dress again in a years-old photo, he realizes that her closet might have nothing else, but gets caught peeking inside. He gets dumped, losing the chance to ever learn the truth.

Newman declares that the bike will be cut in half. Only Kramer offers to give up the bike to save it, so Newman pronounces him the "true owner". However, Kramer cannot afford his food bill after just one week, forcing him to sell the bike to Newman. As Newman goes on a joyride, Elaine chases him down.

== Production ==
The man in the photo with Christie is episode co-writer Alec Berg.

Newman's means of determining the bike's rightful owner is based on the Judgment of Solomon, a Biblical story in which Solomon determined which of two women is the mother of a child.

The ending of the episode's George story was abbreviated during editing. Among the cuts were George telling the hospital staff that he is the father of Carrie's child so that he can fill out the paperwork which identifies the child's name, and a scene in which Jerry and Susan admire the infant Seven while George continues to brood.

The episode has a run time of 20 minutes.

== In popular culture ==
In ranking the best Seinfeld episodes, Screencrush had this episode at 89th, Vanity Fair had it at 67th and Vulture had it at 48th.
