= The Postponement =

- Seinfeld episode
- Episode no.: Season 7 Episode 2
- Directed by: Andy Ackerman
- Written by: Larry David
- Production code: 702
- Original air date: September 28, 1995

Guest appearances
- Heidi Swedberg as Susan Ross; Bruce Mahler as Rabbi; Kelly Perine as Usher; John Rubano as Man; Evie Peck as Woman

Episode chronology
← Previous "The Engagement"	Next → "The Maestro"
- Seinfeld season 7

"The Postponement" is the 112th episode of the NBC sitcom Seinfeld, and the second episode of the seventh season. It aired in the U.S. on September 28, 1995. In this episode, the newly-engaged George needs to disappoint Susan Ross by postponing their wedding; Elaine confides her jealousy of George to a rabbi with no sense of privacy; and Kramer smuggles a latte into a movie down his pants.

== Plot ==
Elaine is grateful to a rabbi at her building for freeing her from her neighbor's noisy dog. Elaine denies to Jerry that she envies George's engagement, but confides the true depths of her jealousy and resentment when the rabbi lends an ear.

Because Susan does not share George's interest in toilet stall doors, he loses his nerve for marrying her by December as planned. Jerry cavalierly suggests that he should postpone, even if it disappoints Susan. George gratefully vows that he would not turn Jerry in for murder, but Kramer righteously pledges that he would.

George picks the first day of spring as an auspicious wedding day, but, as Jerry foresees, he makes Susan cry and hastily takes it back. Jerry gets another chance to see Plan 9 from Outer Space, and Kramer smuggles a caffè latte down his pants into the theater. Kramer trips and agonizingly burns his crotch with a spill, then gets ratted out by Jerry.

To Elaine's horror, the rabbi freely divulges her confessions to not only Jerry, but also everyone in her building, including a man she likes. The rabbi is completely oblivious that he should not have done this. With George himself still in the dark, Elaine feigns "heartfelt congratulations" to him.

George sees a man rebuffing a crying woman with callous indifference, and resolves to stand his ground on the postponement. Instead, he blubbers uncontrollably, earning Susan's sympathy and consent; he is awed by the power of crying to get his way. Kramer's injury stands to earn him a windfall with a lawsuit over the scalding coffee.

Susan and George tune in to the rabbi sermonizing on public-access television. He uses Elaine's jealousy as a parable without changing any names, revealing her disrespect for George, and her gossip that George once contemplated cheating on one's fiancée with a prostitute.

== Production ==
Rabbi Kirschbaum was named after Seinfeld writer Bruce Kirschbaum (though the character was renamed Rabbi Glickman in his later appearances).

Jerry Seinfeld's delivery of the line "I think it's fantastic, I think it's a fantastic idea" is an homage to comedian Jackie Mason.

The story of Kramer's lawsuit over spilled coffee is a parody of the McDonald's coffee case.

Jerry tells Kramer that he missed seeing Plan 9 from Outer Space five years ago due to a problem at a restaurant. This is a reference to the second season episode "The Chinese Restaurant".
