= 49th Writers Guild of America Awards =

49th WGA Awards
- Date: 1997
- Organized by: Writers Guild of America, East and the Writers Guild of America, West

The 49th Writers Guild of America Awards, given on 16 March 1997, honored the best writers of screen and television of 1996.

== Film ==
=== Best Original Screenplay ===
Fargo - Joel and Ethan Coen †

- Jerry Maguire - Cameron Crowe
- Lone Star - John Sayles
- Secrets & Lies - Mike Leigh
- Shine - Jan Sardi and Scott Hicks

=== Best Adapted Screenplay ===
Sling Blade - Billy Bob Thornton †

- Emma - Douglas McGrath
- The Birdcage - Elaine May
- The English Patient - Anthony Minghella
- Trainspotting - John Hodge

== Television ==
=== Best Episodic Drama ===
Girl Talk - NYPD Blue - Theresa Rebeck and Bill Clark

- Aftershock - Law & Order - Janis Diamond and Michael S. Chernuchin
- Savages - Law & Order - Morgan Gendel, Barry M. Schkolnick and Michael S. Chernuchin
- Trophy - Law & Order - Jeremy R. Litman, Ed Zuckerman and Michael S. Chernuchin
- Pilot - Murder One - Charles H. Eglee, Channing Gibson, Steven Bochco and David Milch
- Falsies - Party of Five - Mark B. Perry
- Clyde Bruckman's Final Repose - The X Files - Darin Morgan

=== Best Episodic Comedy ===
The Pool Guy - Seinfeld - David Mandel

- The Soup Nazi - Seinfeld - Spike Feresten
- The Sponge - Seinfeld - Peter Mehlman
- Eight - The Larry Sanders Show - Peter Tolan
