= The Wink (Seinfeld) =

- Seinfeld episode
- Episode no.: Season 7 Episode 4
- Directed by: Andy Ackerman
- Written by: Tom Gammill & Max Pross
- Production code: 704
- Original air date: October 12, 1995

Guest appearances
- Paul O'Neill as himself; Tom Wright as Morgan; Stacey Travis as Holly; Richard Herd as Wilhelm; Brian McNamara as James; Ian Patrick Williams as Stubs; Thomas Dekker as Bobby; Clive Rosengren as Waiter

Episode chronology
← Previous "The Maestro"	Next → "The Hot Tub"
- Seinfeld season 7

"The Wink" is the 114th episode of the NBC sitcom Seinfeld. This was the fourth episode in the seventh season. It first aired on October 12, 1995. In this episode, Elaine finds romance over a wake-up call, everyone misunderstands George when he develops an involuntary wink, Jerry fakes a meat-heavy diet to earn his girlfriend's respect, and Kramer sells a birthday card meant for George Steinbrenner.

== Plot ==
One morning over the phone, Elaine's wake-up caller, James, asks her out. Knowing James only by voice, Elaine is relieved to beat Jerry's "twenty to one" odds that he is attractive, but cannot get along with James's two dogs. Jerry starts eating healthy, but his breakfast grapefruit squirts into George's eye, which begins unconsciously winking in irritation.

George's coworker, Mr. Morgan, has been coming in late. George vouches for Morgan's conduct, but his conspiratorial winking brings down suspicion upon Morgan. Meanwhile, the Yankees all sign a birthday card for Steinbrenner, and George must get the last missing signature from Morgan. George shoots down Kramer's scheme to sell the card to a sports memorabilia store, but Kramer takes his wink as tacit approval. To save Morgan's job, George recommends James's wake-up services to him.

Jerry takes Elaine's cousin Holly out to a steakhouse, but orders the salad for a lack of healthy dishes. He immediately regrets undercutting his own manliness as a "salad eater", and joins Elaine at Holly's for dinner to redeem himself. Holly flaunts many heirlooms that her Grandma Memma did not see fit to share with Elaine's family. Jerry fakes an appetite for Holly's mutton, while hiding each mouthful, bundled in Grandma Memma's napkins, in his jacket pockets.

Needled by Holly, Elaine leaves early wearing Jerry's jacket, but the concealed mutton baits a pack of hungry dogs. Thinking they are hounding her for her dognapping, Elaine hides out overnight with James, but must share his sofa bed. Forced to sleep crammed "head-to-toe" for the sake of chastity, James is kept awake by Elaine's feet in his face, and neglects his early-morning wakeups, including Morgan. Elaine forgets to take the jacket, leaving the mutton to be found by James's dogs.

The birthday card ends up framed in glass and bought for Bobby, a young Yankees fan in the hospital. Forced to get the card back, Kramer cuts a deal with Bobby by volunteering his favorite player, Paul O'Neill, to hit two home runs in one game. O'Neill himself is dismayed to be saddled with such insurmountable odds, but miraculously follows a first home run with a second inside the park. Bobby reneges when the hit is downgraded to a triple due to a fielding error. Kramer finally wrests the card from Bobby by volunteering O'Neill to catch a fly ball in his hat.

Holly cooks pork chops at Jerry's apartment, leaving him nowhere to stash away each mouthful except his couch. James brings back Jerry's ravaged jacket, with dogs in tow. Wearing Holly's missing napkins, they root out the meat in the couch in front of her.

George gets credited for framing the birthday card, while Morgan is blamed for failing to sign it. As his reward, George gets handpicked to replace the disgraced Morgan, whose job is far more laborious but hardly pays better.

== Production ==
The scene with Paul O'Neill was the first scene filmed for Seinfeld's seventh season, to take advantage of the New York Yankees being in the area for a game.
