= Liebeck v. McDonald's Restaurants =

1994 product liability lawsuit

- Court: Second Judicial District Court, Bernalillo County
- Full case name: Stella Liebeck v. McDonald's Restaurants, P.T.S., Inc. and McDonald's International, Inc.
- Decided: August 18, 1994
- Citations: 1994 Extra LEXIS 23 (Bernalillo County, N.M. Dist. Ct. 1994), 1995 WL 360309 (Bernalillo County, N.M. Dist. Ct. 1994),

Court membership
- Judge sitting: Robert H. Scott

Liebeck v. McDonald's Restaurants, also known as the McDonald's coffee case and the hot coffee lawsuit, was a highly publicized 1994 product liability lawsuit in the United States against the restaurant corporation McDonald's. A jury found McDonald's liable for injuries suffered by a customer who spilled a hot cup of coffee on herself, and awarded her in excess of $2.8 million ($6.1 million in 2025).

On February 27, 1992, the plaintiff, Stella Liebeck, aged 79, purchased hot coffee from a McDonald's restaurant, accidentally spilled it in her lap, and suffered third-degree burns in her pelvic region. She was hospitalized for eight days while undergoing skin grafting, followed by two years of medical treatment. Liebeck sought to settle with McDonald's for $20,000 to cover her medical expenses. When McDonald's refused, Liebeck's attorney filed suit in the U.S. District Court for the District of New Mexico, accusing McDonald's of gross negligence.

Liebeck's attorneys argued that, at 180–190 °F (82–88 °C), McDonald's coffee was defective, and more likely to cause serious injury than coffee served at any other establishment. The jury found that McDonald's was 80% responsible for the incident. Liebeck was awarded a net $160,000 in compensatory damages to cover medical expenses, and $2.7 million (equivalent to $5,900,000 in 2025) in punitive damages. The trial judge reduced the punitive damages to three times the amount of the compensatory damages, totaling $640,000. The parties settled for a confidential amount before an appeal was decided.

The Liebeck case became a flashpoint in the debate in the United States over tort reform. It was cited by some as an example of frivolous litigation; ABC News called the case "the poster child of excessive lawsuits", while the legal scholar Jonathan Turley argued that the claim was "a meaningful and worthy lawsuit". Ex-attorney Susan Saladoff sees the portrayal in the media as purposeful misrepresentation due to political and corporate influence. In June 2011, HBO premiered Hot Coffee, a documentary that discussed in depth how the Liebeck case has centered in debates on tort reform.

== Burn incident ==
On February 27, 1992, Stella Liebeck, aged 79, ordered a 49-cent cup of coffee from the drive-through window of a McDonald's restaurant in Albuquerque, New Mexico. Liebeck was in the passenger's seat of a 1989 Ford Probe, which did not have cup holders. Her grandson parked so that she could add cream and sugar to her coffee. She placed the coffee cup between her knees and pulled the far side of the lid toward her to remove it. In the process, she spilled the entire cup of coffee on her lap. She was wearing cotton sweatpants, which absorbed the coffee and held it against her skin, scalding her thighs, buttocks, and groin.

Liebeck was taken to an emergency room at a hospital. She suffered third-degree burns on six percent of her skin and lesser burns over 16%. She remained in the hospital for eight days while she underwent skin grafting. During this period, she lost 20 pounds (9.1 kg), nearly 20% of her body weight, reducing her to 83 pounds (38 kg). After the hospital stay, she needed care for three weeks, which was provided by her daughter. She suffered permanent disfigurement after the incident and was partially disabled for two years.

== Attempts to settle ==
Liebeck sought to settle with McDonald's for $20,000 to cover her actual and anticipated expenses. Her past medical expenses were $10,500; her anticipated future medical expenses were approximately $2,500; and her daughter's loss of income was approximately $5,000 for a total of approximately $18,000. McDonald's offered only $800.

When McDonald's refused to raise its offer, Liebeck retained the Texas attorney Reed Morgan. Morgan filed suit in the U.S. District Court for the District of New Mexico, accusing McDonald's of gross negligence for selling coffee that was "unreasonably dangerous" and "defectively manufactured". Morgan offered to settle for $300,000, and a mediator suggested $225,000 just before trial; McDonald's refused both.

== Trial ==
The trial took place from August 8 to 17, 1994, before New Mexico District Court Judge Robert H. Scott. During the case, Liebeck's attorneys discovered that McDonald's required franchisees to hold coffee at 180–190 °F (82–88 °C). Liebeck's attorneys argued that coffee should never be served hotter than 140 °F (60 °C), and that a number of other establishments served coffee at a substantially lower temperature than McDonald's. The attorneys presented evidence that coffee they had tested all over the city was served at a temperature at least 20 °F (11 °C) lower than McDonald's coffee. They also presented the jury with expert testimony that 190 °F (88 °C) coffee may produce third-degree burns (where skin grafting is necessary) in about three seconds and 180 °F (82 °C) coffee may produce such burns in about 12 to 15 seconds. Lowering the temperature to 160 °F (71 °C) would increase the time for the coffee to produce such a burn to 20 seconds. Liebeck's attorneys argued that these extra seconds could provide adequate time to remove the coffee from exposed skin, thereby preventing many burns.

McDonald's claimed that the reason for serving such hot coffee in its drive-through windows was that those who purchased the coffee typically were commuters who wanted to drive a distance with the coffee; the high initial temperature would keep the coffee hot during the trip. However, it was found that McDonald's had carried out research finding that customers intend to consume the coffee immediately while driving. McDonald's had also received advice from consultants that high temperatures are necessary in brewing to fully extract the flavor.

Other documents showed that, from 1982 to 1992, McDonald's had received more than 700 reports of people burned by its coffee to varying degrees of severity, and had settled claims arising from scalding injuries for more than $500,000. McDonald's quality control manager, Christopher Appleton, testified that this number was insufficient to cause the company to evaluate its practices. He argued that all foods hotter than 130 °F (54 °C) constituted a burn hazard, and that restaurants had more pressing dangers to worry about. The plaintiffs argued that Appleton conceded that McDonald's coffee would burn the mouth and throat if consumed when served.

=== Verdict ===
A twelve-person jury reached its verdict on August 18, 1994. Applying the principles of comparative negligence, the jury found that McDonald's was 80% responsible for the incident and Liebeck was 20% at fault. Though there was a warning on the coffee cup, the jury decided it was neither large enough nor sufficient. They awarded Liebeck $200,000 in compensatory damages, which was reduced by 20% to $160,000. In addition, they awarded her $2.7 million in punitive damages. According to The New York Times, the jurors arrived at this figure from Morgan's suggestion to penalize McDonald's for two days of coffee revenues, about $1.35 million per day.

The judge reduced punitive damages to $480,000, three times the compensatory amount, for a total of $640,000. The decision was appealed by both McDonald's and Liebeck in December 1994, but the parties settled out of court for an undisclosed amount. The Albuquerque Journal ran the first story of the verdict, followed by the Associated Press wire, which was picked up by newspapers around the world.

== Aftermath ==
The Liebeck case is often cited by proponents of tort reform, who controversially frame the case as frivolous litigation. ABC News called the case "the poster child of excessive lawsuits". The legal commentator Jonathan Turley called it "a meaningful and worthy lawsuit". McDonald's asserts that the outcome of the case was a fluke, and attributed the loss to poor communications and strategy by an unfamiliar insurer representing a franchise. Liebeck's attorney, Reed Morgan, and the Association of Trial Lawyers of America defended the result in Liebeck by claiming that McDonald's reduced the temperature of its coffee after the suit, although McDonald's in fact had not done so.

Detractors have argued that McDonald's refusal to offer more than an $800 settlement for the $10,500 in medical bills indicated that the suit was meritless and highlighted the fact that Liebeck spilled the coffee on herself rather than any wrongdoing on the company's part. They state that the vast majority of judges who consider similar cases dismiss them before they get to a jury.

Liebeck died on August 5, 2004, aged 91. According to her daughter, "the burns and court proceedings (had taken) their toll" and in the years following the settlement Liebeck had no quality of life. She said the settlement had paid for a live-in nurse.

=== Similar lawsuits ===
In McMahon v. Bunn Matic Corporation (1998), Seventh Circuit Court of Appeals Judge Frank Easterbrook wrote a unanimous opinion affirming dismissal of a similar lawsuit against coffeemaker manufacturer Bunn-O-Matic, finding that 179 °F (82 °C) hot coffee was not "unreasonably dangerous". In Bogle v. McDonald's Restaurants Ltd. (2002), a similar lawsuit in the United Kingdom failed when the court rejected the claim that McDonald's could have avoided injury by serving coffee at a lower temperature.

Since Liebeck, major vendors of coffee, including Chick-fil-A, Starbucks, Dunkin', Wendy's, Burger King, hospitals, and McDonald's have been defendants in similar lawsuits over coffee-related burns. There have also been lawsuits over injuries from other hot liquids. Two years before Liebeck, a similar lawsuit was settled during the trial for $15 million due to injuries from a sink in a rented apartment.

Another lawsuit involving McDonald's was heard in Florida with the restaurant sued after a four-year-old girl suffered second-degree burns after a chicken nugget from a Happy Meal fell in between her leg and the seatbelt. McDonald's was found liable for negligence in the case and in July 2023, the girl, then eight years old, was awarded $800,000 in damages.

=== Coffee temperature ===
According to a 2007 report, McDonald's had not reduced the temperature of its coffee, serving it at 176–194 °F (80–90 °C), relying on more sternly worded warnings on cups made of rigid foam to avoid future injury and liability (though it continues to face lawsuits over hot coffee). However, in 2013, The New York Times reported that McDonald's had lowered its service temperature to 170–180 °F (77–82 °C). The Specialty Coffee Association of America supports improved packaging methods rather than lowering the temperature at which coffee is served. The association has successfully aided the defense of subsequent coffee burn cases.

=== Hot Coffee documentary ===
On June 27, 2011, HBO premiered a documentary about tort reform problems, Hot Coffee. A large portion of the film covered Liebeck's lawsuit. This included news clips, comments from celebrities and politicians about the case, as well as myths and misconceptions, including how many people thought she was driving when the incident occurred and thought that she suffered only minor superficial burns.

=== The New York Times Retro Report ===
On October 21, 2013, The New York Times published a Retro Report video about the media reaction and an accompanying article about the changes in coffee drinking over 20 years. The New York Times noted how the details of Liebeck's story lost length and context as it was reported worldwide, and that McDonald's, rather than Liebeck, was portrayed as the victim. Within a month, the Retro Report video had more than one million views and had triggered debate in the online comments.

== See also ==
- Compensation culture
- McDonald's legal cases
- "The Postponement" and "The Maestro" — Seinfeld episodes which include a parody of the case

== Bibliography ==
- Greenlee, Mark B. (1997). "Kramer v. Java World: Images, Issues, and Idols in the Debate over Tort Reform". Capital University Law Review. 26 (4): 701–738.
- Haltom, William; McCann, Michael (2009) [2004]. Distorting the Law: Politics, Media, and the Litigation Crisis. Chicago: University of Chicago Press. ISBN 978-0-226-31469-3.
- Nader, Ralph; Smith, Wesley J. (1996). No Contest: Corporate Lawyers and the Perversion of Justice in America. New York: Random House. ISBN 978-0-679-42972-2.
