= The Abstinence =

- Seinfeld episode
- Episode no.: Season 8 Episode 9
- Directed by: Andy Ackerman
- Written by: Steve Koren
- Production code: 809
- Original air date: November 21, 1996

Guest appearances
- Phil Morris as Jackie Chiles; Bob Odenkirk as Ben Gelfen; Derek Jeter as himself; Bernie Williams as himself; Alex Trebek as himself; Brenda Strong as Sue Ellen; Debra Jo Rupp as Katie; Meagen Fay as Mrs. Burns; Tamara Bick as Louise; Lawrence Mandley as Larry the Cook; Kyle Gass as Smoker; Fern Fitzgerald as Ms. Wilkie; Noëlle Balfour as Portuguese waitress; Judy Kerr as Woman; David Letterman as himself (uncredited)

Episode chronology
← Previous "The Chicken Roaster"	Next → "The Andrea Doria"
- Seinfeld season 8

"The Abstinence" is the 143rd episode of the American sitcom Seinfeld. This was the ninth episode for the eighth season, originally broadcast on the NBC network on November 21, 1996. This episode focuses on George and Elaine's experiments with sexual abstinence, which has a polar opposite effect on each one's intelligence. Meanwhile, Kramer's face becomes disfigured by smoke when he turns his apartment into a smoking lounge, prompting him to file a lawsuit against the tobacco companies.

== Plot ==
George's girlfriend Louise has mononucleosis, so he can't have sex with her for six weeks. Without sex to distract him, George's mind becomes sharper, he learns things more quickly, and develops a deeper relationship with Louise.

Elaine brags that she is dating a doctor, but her boyfriend Ben informs her that not only is he not yet a doctor, he has failed his licensing exam three times. Elaine continues to boast that Ben is a doctor, but her cover is blown when he is unable to help when a man passes out in Monk's. She uses George's technique of abstinence to help him study to get his license. She begins to experience difficulty forming normal sentences, and Jerry theorizes that abstinence has the reverse effect on women. She begs Jerry to have sex with her, to clear her mind. Jerry turns her down because of the weird circumstances. Ben gets his license and dumps Elaine, leaving her sexually frustrated.

Jerry agrees to appear at career day at his former junior high school, but he is bumped off, first when the zoo worker with a preceding slot runs long, then because of a fire drill. Jerry's agent gets him a whole assembly at the school. Jerry struggles to figure out how to fill two hours in front of a junior high crowd. George creates a presentation for the assembly.

Seeing a bunch of smokers forced to smoke outside Monk's, Kramer is inspired to open up his apartment as a smoking lounge. The extensive secondhand smoke makes his face become leathery. Kramer sees his lawyer Jackie Chiles about suing the tobacco company for ruining his good looks. The company bypasses Chiles and settles with Kramer by featuring him as a smoking cowboy on a Times Square billboard, with no pay.

Louise tells George that her mononucleosis diagnosis was incorrect, but he decides that he prefers his newfound mental acuity to sex with her. She breaks up with him in sexual frustration. George has sex with a Portuguese waitress. He arrives at the school to meet Jerry, but with his intellect back to his usual, he can no longer do the presentation. Jerry goes in, and bombs. Talk show host David Letterman informs Jerry his appearance has been canceled because of the middle school mishaps.

== Production ==
Ben was based on a friend of writer Steve Koren's who failed the licensing exam to be a doctor multiple times.

This episode was filmed in front of a live audience on November 6, 1996. Wade Boggs was originally included in the script but didn't make it into the filming. David Letterman's cameo was filmed at his office at the Ed Sullivan Theater in New York.

Jackie Chiles actor Phil Morris said he found it very gratifying to be in an episode in which his character takes on the tobacco companies, having been made fun of his entire life due to his having the same name as the tobacco brand Philip Morris.
