= Russ Leatherman =

American actor

- Born: February 14, 1962 (age 64); United States
- Occupations: Voice actor, film critic
- Known for: Co-founder of Moviefone

Russ Leatherman (born February 14, 1962) is a co-founder of Moviefone, a popular movie guide. Known for his trademark greeting, “Hellooo and welcome to Moviefone!”, the greeting has been featured or parodied on many programs including The Simpsons, Saturday Night Live, Late Night with Conan O'Brien, the 2005 Academy Awards, VH1's I Love the 90s, Fair Game, and was used in the epilogue of Seinfeld episode "The Pool Guy".

As a movie critic, Leatherman's reviews are seen on CNN, CNN Headline News, ABC-TV, CBS's The Early Show, Fox News, MSNBC, NPR, the nationally syndicated The Daily Buzz morning show, and heard on a number of top radio stations nationwide including Z100 in New York, KRTH-FM in Los Angeles and the nationally syndicated Westwood One, USA Radio Network, ABC Radio Network, and (every Friday during Elvis Duran and the Morning Show) Premiere Networks.

Leatherman has appeared on national talk shows such as the Late Show with David Letterman, The Oprah Winfrey Show, The Ellen DeGeneres Show, Opie and Anthony, The Howard Stern Show, Elvis Duran and the Morning Show, The Caroline Rhea Show and many others. He has also been profiled in the pages of Time magazine, People, Entertainment Weekly, Life, Vanity Fair and The New York Times. Leatherman also appears regularly with Jonathon Brandmeier on the Brandmeier Show on Westwood One.

Leatherman co-founded the Moviefone company in 1989 and has been the voice of the character "Mr. Moviefone" from the start. Leatherman is a former University of Idaho student and DJ (where he received his degree in Television and Radio).

Moviefone was purchased by AOL in 1999.

Leatherman is also known as "The Movie Man" and does reports on upcoming movies every weekend called "Six Second Reviews" which are seen on several local newscasts across the United States.
