= Patrick Bristow =

American actor, comedian and director (born 1962)

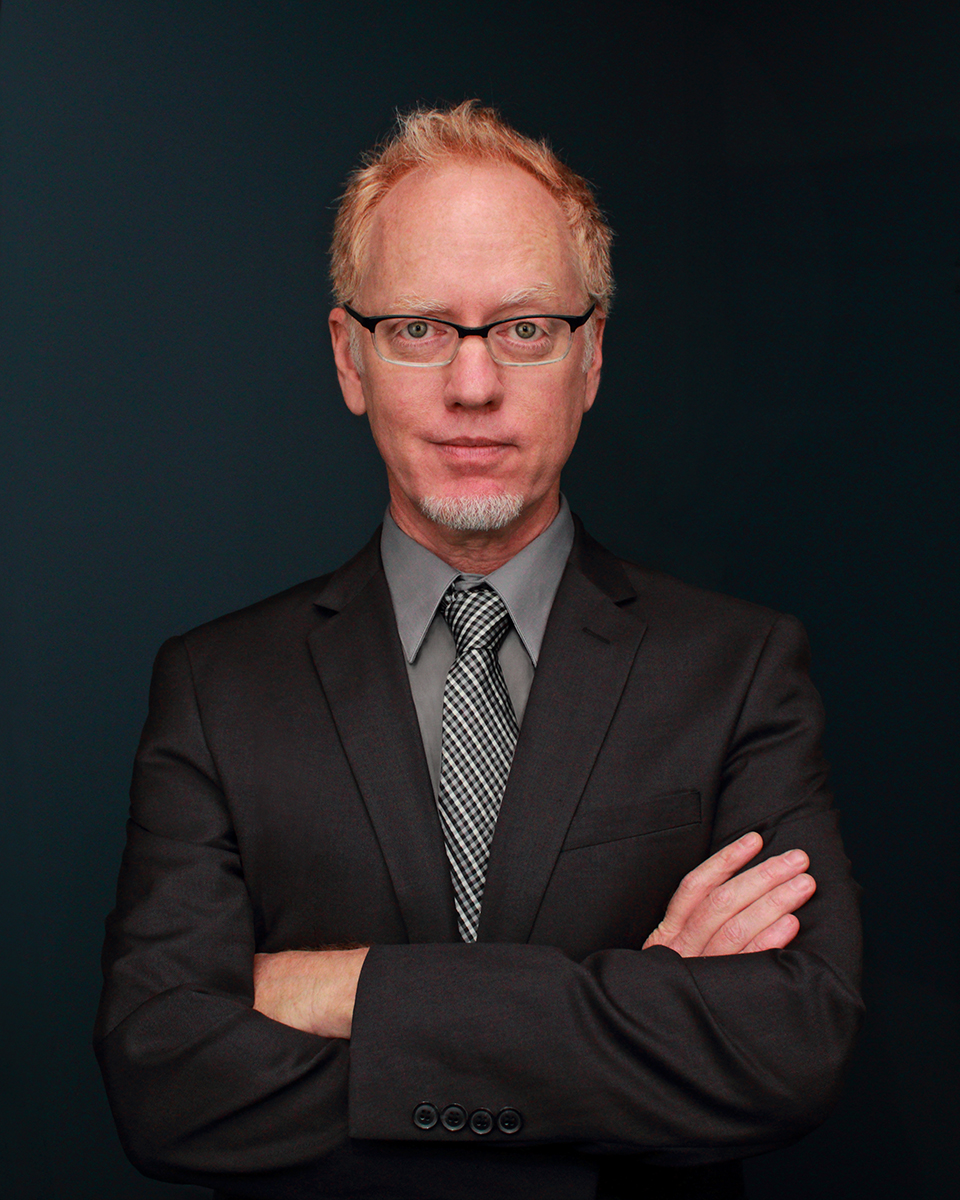
- Patrick Bristow in 2013
- Born: September 26, 1962 (age 64); Los Angeles, California, United States
- Occupations: Actor; comedian; director
- Years active: 1985–present
- Spouse: Andrew Nicastro (m. 2010)

Patrick Bristow (born September 26, 1962) is an American actor, comedian and director. He is best known for playing Peter Barnes on Ellen (1994–1998), and Patrick on The Suite Life of Zack & Cody (2005–2008), and for the film Pain & Gain (2013).

== Life and career ==
Bristow was born in Los Angeles. He appeared as Peter on Ellen. His TV guest-star roles include Seinfeld's "The Wig Master", his recurring role as the Machiavellian Troy on Mad About You, and Larry David's choreographer on Curb Your Enthusiasm. He has also guest-starred on Malcolm in the Middle.

== Filmography ==
Year	Title	Role	Notes
1991	Delirious	Bellboy	
1993	So I Married an Axe Murderer	Cafe Roads Performer	
1994	Revenge of the Red Baron	Guard	
1994	Sister, Sister	Henrique	Episode: "Hair Today"
1994–1998	Ellen	Peter Barnes	19 episodes
1995	A Bucket of Blood	Link	TV movie
1995	Showgirls	Marty Jacobsen	
1996	The Twilight of the Golds	Brandon	
1996	Seinfeld	The Wig Master	Episode: "The Wig Master"
1996	Mad About You	Hotel Clerk	Episode: "Fertility"
1996	Austin Powers: International Man of Mystery	Bolton, Virtucon Tour Guide	
1997	Head over Heels	Ian	7 episodes
1998	I'm Losing You	Rico	
1999	Friends	The Stage Manager	Episode: "The One with the Routine"
2000	The Amanda Show	Coach Guillermo	"Moody's Point Segment"
2001	Beethoven's 4th	Guillermo	
2003	Detonator	DeJuan Michaels	
2004	That's So Raven	Tony	Episode: "The Road to Audition"
2004	Curb Your Enthusiasm	Steve the Choreographer	2 episodes
2004–2005	Malcolm in the Middle	Phillip/Lloyd	
2005	Zoey 101	Mr. Fletcher	Episode: "The Play"
2005	The Longest Yard	Walt	
2005	The Inner Circle	Ramon	
2005	Jimmy and Judy	Dr. Walters	
2005–2008	The Suite Life of Zack & Cody	Patrick	Recurring role; 9 episodes
2006	The Enigma with a Stigma	Joe McVicker	
2006	Friends & Lovers: The Ski Trip 2	Mark	
2010	All About Evil	Peter Gorge	
2010	Good Luck Charlie	Mr. Dingwall	Episode: "Teddy's Little Helper"
2011	Bucket and Skinner's Epic Adventures	Mr. St. Troy	Episode: "Epic Musical"
2013	Pain & Gain	Spy Shop Clerk	
2014	My Trip Back to the Dark Side	Belly Wrapper	
2014	Transformers: Age of Extinction	Landlord's Grandson	
2014	Reality	Klaus	
2015	Pretty Little Liars	Gallery Owner	
2015	Shameless	Bill	
2016	Criminal Minds	Asher Douglas	Episode: "The Storm"
2018	Mistrust	Trent Masterson	
2019	The Untold Story	Walter	
2021	Barb and Star Go To Vista Del Mar	Dr. Bradley	
2021	The Morning Show	Gordon	4 episodes
2022	NCIS	Channing Elroy	Episode: "The Helpers"
2023	Minx	Walt	Episode: "God closes a door, opens a glory hole"
2024	Nobody Wants This	Pat	Episode: "The Ick"
2024–2025	Wizards Beyond Waverly Place	Wizardpedia/ Wiz M.D	2 episodes
