= Frostbite (2005 film) =

- Directed by: Jonathan Baker Schwartz
- Written by: Paul Miller; Steve Rogers
- Starring: Peter Jason; Traci Lords; Adam Grimes; Phil Morris; Gus Farwell
- Cinematography: Andrew B. Andersen
- Edited by: Darren Ayres
- Music by: Richard Kosinski
- Production company: Starboard Entertainment
- Distributed by: 20th Century Fox Home Entertainment
- Release date: February 15, 2005
- Language: English

Frostbite is a 2005 American comedy film. It features Suzanne Stokes and Buffy Tyler and the Hawaiian girls.

== Plot summary ==
In Mammoth Mountain, a group of misfit slackers battle a group of egotistical snobs for snowboarding rights to a ski mountain.

== Cast ==
- Peter Jason as Colonel Jaffe
- Traci Lords as Naomi Bucks
- Adam Grimes as Billy Wagstaff
- Phil Morris as J.P. Millhouse
- Gus Farwell as Sven Darden
- Christian Oliver as Hans Gruber

== Trivia ==
- Frostbite is an unofficial remake of the classic ski-comedy Hot Dog…The Movie starring John Reger as Rudolph "Rudi" Garmisch.
- Gus Farwell, who plays the iconic Sven Darden, is also known as the former Arizona State University quarterback, turned opera singer.
- Christian Oliver's character is named Hans Gruber.
