= The Gum =

- Seinfeld episode
- Episode no.: Season 7 Episode 10
- Directed by: Andy Ackerman
- Written by: Tom Gammill & Max Pross
- Production code: 710
- Original air date: December 14, 1995

Guest appearances
- Matt McCoy as Lloyd Braun; Mary Jo Keenen as Deena Lazzari; Sandy Ward as Pop Lazzari; Eric Christmas as Haarwood; Ruth Cohen as Cashier; Lionel Mark Smith as Florist; Vito D'Ambrosio as Cop; Alan Watt as Attendant; Larry David as Man in Window (uncredited)

Episode chronology
← Previous "The Sponge"	Next → "The Rye"
- Seinfeld season 7

"The Gum" is the 120th episode of the NBC sitcom Seinfeld. This was the tenth episode for the seventh season. It aired on December 14, 1995. In this episode, Kramer campaigns to revitalize an old movie theater; George's delight in Lloyd Braun's mental breakdown throws his own sanity into doubt; Jerry is forced to appreciate unappetizing chewing gum to humor Lloyd; and Elaine accidentally puts on increasingly lascivious displays for Lloyd.

== Plot ==
Kramer campaigns to revitalize the Alex, an old movie theater, with former mayoral advisor Lloyd Braun helping lobby for a landmark designation. Due to bungling the Dinkins reelection campaign, Lloyd spent time institutionalized for a nervous breakdown, and Kramer demands that everyone humor Lloyd to support his recovery. Lloyd shares some chewing gum imported from China, which Jerry finds underwhelming.

Back on his old street, George has a reunion with childhood friend Deena and her father Pop, the neighborhood mechanic. George takes pleasure in gossiping to Deena about Lloyd's downfall. George entrusts his LeBaron to Pop's hands, but learns too late that Pop is no longer competent due to a nervous breakdown.

Elaine and Jerry see Spartacus at the Alex, with an appearance by the film's wardrobe assistant Geoffrey Haarwood, but Elaine gets blindsided when Kramer brings Lloyd, her ex-boyfriend. Fearing that she caused Lloyd's breakdown, Elaine sits in the front row to avoid leading him on again, making an excuse that Jerry is nearsighted.

Leaning back uncomfortably, Elaine takes off her antique blouse button as she picks popcorn off herself. Exiting with neck strain, she does not notice her lewdly unbuttoned top. This makes Lloyd assume she is seducing him, and makes a policeman eagerly help her stop a florist from excessively hosing the sidewalk.

George accuses a cashier at Monk's of shortchanging him, but is forced to back down because Lloyd is waiting in line. Deena notices George's fixation on Lloyd, and diagnoses him with the same paranoia that led to Pop's breakdown. Later, as the cashier badgers George to vacate his parking spot, his engine catches fire thanks to Pop's handiwork; with the florist nearby but deprived of his hose, the car is incinerated.

For the sake of Lloyd's self-esteem, Kramer forces Jerry to savor the unappealing gum, to take Lloyd up on his offer to get more, and to pass off random glasses from the theater lost-and-found as his own. When the theater concession will not sell Lloyd a plainly inedible leftover hot dog, Kramer eats it himself to back up Lloyd, but throws up outside, forcing the florist to hose down the sidewalk again. The florist accidentally soaks Elaine's shirt, making her look even more exhibitionist in front of Lloyd.

Jerry goes to Chinatown with Lloyd to buy gum, while all but blinded by very strong prescription glasses. George continues acting delusional to Deena, blaming Pop, the cashier, and the florist for destroying his car, then failing to get Jerry to recognize him. Handing over money he cannot read, Jerry unwittingly buys $100 in unwanted gum.

To promote another movie, Kramer borrows an ornate Henry VIII costume from Haarwood's film costume preservation "Institute", but it will only fit George. Just as Deena finally believes that George is "not crazy", she sees him decked out in regalia as though institutionalized for delusions of grandeur. Haarwood, wearing Elaine's button, lets her take it back, causing Lloyd to pity her for groping at a much older man.

== Production ==
The inspiration for "The Gum" came from assistant director Randy Carter, who was heavily involved with the reopening of the Alex Theatre and would often promote the theatre to the Seinfeld cast and crew in a manner similar to Kramer in the episode. In the initial draft of the script, Elaine assumed she mistakenly ate her button, which coincidentally ends up in the Alex Theatre's plumbing; and Jerry sincerely wanted more of Lloyd's gum, while Kramer was wary of Lloyd and tried to dissuade Jerry. This episode also concludes the chronicle of co-writer Tom Gammill's car, making its final appearance as George's car: just as "The Mom & Pop Store" lampooned Gammill's acquisition of the car, this episode memorializes the car catching fire in real life, showing off its burned and melted state on camera.

Gammill and his writing partner Max Pross wanted to give Ruth Cohen, an extra in numerous Seinfeld episodes, a role in the story. They had first taken notice of her before they joined the writing staff, when they were just fans of the show. Cohen had never acted before and performed poorly at her audition for "The Gum", but Jerry Seinfeld petitioned on her behalf. The actor who had previously played Lloyd Braun, Peter Keleghan, had moved to Canada, so the part was reassigned to Matt McCoy.
