= Frances Bay =

American actress (1919–2011)

- Bay in 1999
- Born: Frances Evelyn Goffman; January 23, 1919; Mannville, Alberta, Canada
- Died: September 15, 2011 (aged 92); Tarzana, California, U.S.
- Resting place: Mount Sinai Memorial Park Cemetery
- Occupations: Actress; comedian
- Years active: 1930s–2011
- Spouse: Charles Bay (m. 1946; died 2002)
- Children: 1
- Family: Erving Goffman (brother); Alice Goffman (niece)

Frances Evelyn Bay (née Goffman; January 23, 1919 – September 15, 2011) was a Canadian and American character actress and comedian. In a career that spanned 80 years, she acted in a variety of roles both in film and television. Bay was inducted into Canada's Walk of Fame in 2008.

== Early life ==
Frances Evelyn Goffman was born January 23, 1919, in Mannville, Alberta, to Ann (née Averbach) and Max Goffman. She was from a family of Ukrainian Jews who had emigrated to Canada at the turn of the nineteenth century. She and her younger brother were raised in Dauphin, Manitoba, where her father operated a successful tailoring business. Her younger brother became famed sociologist Erving Goffman. Her niece, Alice Goffman, is also a noted sociologist.

== Career ==
Bay started her career in the 1930s as a radio actress. Before World War II she acted professionally in Winnipeg and spent the war hosting the Canadian Broadcasting Company's radio show, Everybody's Program, aimed at service members overseas. She studied acting with Uta Hagen.

Bay returned to acting in the 1970s while in her mid-fifties, beginning with a small part in Foul Play, a 1978 comedy starring Goldie Hawn and Chevy Chase. A year earlier, she appeared as Mrs. Hamilton in the Christmas television special Christmastime with Mister Rogers.

Bay's first major television appearance occurred playing the grandmother to the character of Fonzie on Happy Days. She described Henry Winkler, who played Fonzie, as "just a sweet guy. He lost his own grandmother in the Holocaust, and he wrote me a letter saying I was his virtual grandmother".

In 1983, she played the grandmother in Little Red Riding Hood in Faerie Tale Theatre for Showtime. She appeared in the final episodes of two long-running sitcom series: Happy Days, and Who's the Boss? In 1990, she appeared in the episode "When I'm 64" of the TV series ALF as the faded movie star Louise Beaumont residing in a retirement home. She appeared on many other shows including The Jeffersons, The Dukes of Hazzard, Alice, Family Ties, Cheers, Hill Street Blues, The Golden Girls, Matlock, Murder, She Wrote, and ER. Bay played Cousin Winifred in the fourth to last episode of Road to Avonlea, a role for which she won a Gemini Award.

Bay's feature film work includes small roles in films like The Karate Kid (1984), Movers & Shakers (1985), Big Top Pee-wee (1988), Twins (1988), The Grifters (1990), The Pit and the Pendulum (1991). In 1986, Bay appeared as the doddery aunt of Kyle MacLachlan's character in David Lynch's Blue Velvet. Lynch cast her in several subsequent works, including as a foul-mouthed madam in Wild at Heart, and as Mrs. Tremond on Twin Peaks and its feature film prequel Twin Peaks: Fire Walk with Me.

In 1994, she played Mrs. Pickman in John Carpenter's In the Mouth of Madness. In 1996, she played Adam Sandler's grandmother in the feature film Happy Gilmore. In 1999, she played Thelma, the head security guard at the Bradford robotics laboratory in the film Inspector Gadget. In 2003, Bay had a brief cameo in the movie Old School, during the funeral for the character “Blue”. Bay's other roles included a supporting role in "The Rye", a notable 1996 episode of Seinfeld in which she played a woman who got into a physical altercation with Jerry over a loaf of marble rye bread.

Bay appeared in the 2002 music video for Jimmy Fallon's comedy song "Idiot Boyfriend", and played the role of geriatric Phoebe Halliwell in Charmed. In 2005, she reunited with her Pit and Pendulum director Stuart Gordon to play a fortune teller in Edmond. From 2009 to 2011, Bay had a recurring role as "Aunt Ginny" on the television series The Middle. She also worked in theatre, winning both the Drama-Logue Award and Gemini Award.

== Personal life and death ==
Bay married Charles Irwin Bay (December 15, 1918 – June 18, 2002) in 1946. The couple had a son, Eli Joshua Bay who died when he was 23 in 1970.

In 2002, Bay was involved in an auto accident in Glendale, California, which required her to have her leg amputated below the knee.

Bay died at the Providence Tarzana Medical Center in the Tarzana neighborhood of Los Angeles on September 15, 2011, of complications from pneumonia at the age of 92.

== Legacy ==
Bay was inducted into Canada's Walk of Fame on September 6, 2008, in large part thanks to a petition with 10,000 names which was submitted on her behalf. The selection committee also received personal letters from Adam Sandler, Jerry Seinfeld, David Lynch, Henry Winkler, Monty Hall, and other celebrities.

In 1997, she won the Canadian Gemini Award for Best Performance by an Actress in a Guest Role in a Dramatic Series, Road To Avonlea.

== Filmography ==
=== Film ===
Year	Title	Role
1978	Foul Play	Mrs. Russel
1979	Chilly Scenes of Winter	Mrs. Delillo
1980	The Attic	The Librarian
1981	Amy	Mrs. Lindey
1981	Honky Tonk Freeway	Mrs. Lewenowski
1983	Private School	Birdie Fallmouth
1984	The Karate Kid	Mrs. Milo
1985	Movers & Shakers	Betty Gritz
1986	Nomads	Bertril
1986	Blue Velvet	Aunt Barbara
1987	Medium Rare	Gertrude
1988	Twins	Mother Superior
1988	Big Top Pee-wee	Mrs. Haynes
1989	The Karate Kid Part III	Mrs. Milo
1990	Wild at Heart	Madam
1990	Arachnophobia	Evelyn Metcalf
1990	The Grifters	Motel Clerk
1991	The Pit and the Pendulum	Esmeralda
1991	Critters 3	Mrs. Menges
1992	Single White Female	Elderly Neighbor
1992	Twin Peaks: Fire Walk with Me	Mrs. Tremond / Mrs. Chalfont
1993	The Neighbor	Aunt Sylvia
1994	The Paperboy	Mrs. Rosemont
1994	In the Mouth of Madness	Mrs. Pickman
1996	Happy Gilmore	Anna Gilmore
1996	Never Too Late	Elisabeth Kronner
1997	Changing Habits	Midge
1997	Sparkler	Raspy
1997	Mitzi & Joe	Mitzi
1998	Krippendorf's Tribe	Edith Proxmire
1999	Inspector Gadget	Thelma
2000	The Operator	Mrs. Sloan
2000	Stranger than Fiction	Mrs. Steiner
2000	A Day in the Life	Rosa
2001	The Wedding Planner	Dottie
2001	Finder's Fee	Mrs. Damsetter
2002	Kiss the Bride	Grandma Julia
2004	In the Land of Milk and Money	Grandma Shallot
2005	Edmond	Fortune Teller
2009	Repo Chick	Grandma De La Chasse
2010	Pickin' & Grinnin	Grandma Johnson
2010	Bare Knuckles	Rosie Mcintyre
2014	Twin Peaks: The Missing Pieces	Mrs. Tremond / Mrs. Chalfont

=== Television ===
Year	Title	Role	Notes
1977	CHiPs	Ruth	Episode: "Name Your Price"
1979	ABC Weekend Special	Madame Zarona	Episode: "The Big Hex of Little Lulu"
1979	Topper	Mrs. Quincy	TV film
1981	The Jeffersons	Mrs. Watson	Episode: "My Hero"
1981	The Dukes of Hazzard	Aunt Hortense	Episode: "The Return of Hughie Hogg"
1981	Murder in Texas	Myra Hill	TV film
1981	Callie & Son	Mabel Simpson	TV film
1982	Father Murphy	Alma Hubbard	Episode: "88 Keys to Happiness"
1982, 1984	Happy Days	Grandma Nussbaum	Episodes: "Grandma Nussbaum", "Going Steady", "Passages: Part 2"
1983	American Playhouse	Mrs. Timmins	Episode: "Wings"
1983	Faerie Tale Theatre	Granny	Episode: "Little Red Riding Hood"
1983	Remington Steele	Mother Trust	Episode: "Scene Steelers"
1984	Alice	Granny Annie	Episode: "Mel Spins His Wheels"
1984	Family Ties	Florence Menlo	Episode: "Keaton and Son"
1984	E/R	Mrs. Gordon	Episode: "A Cold Night in Chicago"
1984	The President of Love	Herbina Plum	TV film
1985	Cagney & Lacey	Edna Kiss	Episode: "Violation"
1985	Fame	Grandma George	Episode: "Who's Afraid of the Big Bad Wolf?"
1985	Amos	Lydia	TV film
1985	Amazing Stories	Mrs. Santa Claus	Episode: "Santa '85"
1985, 1990	Santa Barbara	Mrs. McRae, Sister Gabriella	Episodes: "1.357", "1.359", "1.1405"
1986	Cheers	Mrs. Brubaker	Episode: "Take My Shirt... Please?"
1986	T. J. Hooker	Mrs. Greene	Episode: "Taps for Officer Remy"
1986	Hill Street Blues	Elizabeth Mies	Episode: "Larry of Arabia"
1986	Easy Street	Mrs. Walker	Episode: "Pride Goeth Before a Cheap Hotel"
1986	Simon & Simon	Agnes Rich	Episode: "The Case of Don Diablo"
1986	Sidekicks	Sarah	Episode: "Grey Belts"
1987	LBJ: The Early Years	Effie Pattilo	TV film
1987	Convicted: A Mother's Story	Ma Barker	TV film
1987	St. Elsewhere	Mrs. Renninger	Episode: "Ewe Can't Go Home Again"
1987	The Oldest Rookie	Mrs. Zimmer	Episode: "Ike and Son"
1988	The Golden Girls	Claire	Episode: "The Days and Nights of Sophia Petrillo"
1988	Police Story: Monster Manor	Mary	TV film
1988, 1991	Hunter	Emma Parsons, Mrs. Laskey	Episodes: "The Bogota Million", "Fatal Obsession: Parts 1 & 2"
1989	The Cavanaughs	Widow Kelsey	Episode: "The Cavanaugh Curse"
1989	Newhart	Mrs. Henderson	Episode: "Don't Worry Be Pregnant"
1989	Class Cruise	Grandma	TV film
1989	Dragnet	Sadie McGuire	Episode: "Where's Sadie?"
1989	Generations	Emily Fober	Episodes: "1.175", "1.176", "1.178"
1990	Alien Nation	Mrs. Gillirue	Episode: "Spirit of '95"
1990	ALF	Louise Beaumont	Episode: "When I'm 64"
1990	Equal Justice	Florence Evans	Episode: "Sugar Blues"
1990	Twin Peaks	Mrs. Tremond	Episode: "Coma"
1990	Over My Dead Body	Sister Dempsey	Episode: "Pilot"
1990	True Colors	Aunt Sylvia	Episode: "Occasional Wife"
1990	Tales from the Crypt	Witch	Episode: "Judy, You're Not Yourself Today"
1991	Pacific Station	Celia Linder	Episode: "A Man's Best Friend"
1991	Matlock	Samantha Bergstrom, Rose Hayes	Episodes: "The Trial: Part 2", "The Defense"
1991–1992	Life Goes On	Eleanor, Sarah	Episodes: "Arthur", "Love Letters"
1992	Grave Secrets: The Legacy of Hilltop Drive	Iva Ruth McKinney	TV film
1992	Quantum Leap	Millie Reynolds	Episode: "Moments to Live"
1992	Who's the Boss?	Candy	Episodes: "Savor the Veal: Parts 2 & 3"
1992	L.A. Law	Marian McConnell	Episode: "Silence of the Lambskins"
1992	Down the Shore	Miss Suzette	Episode: "My Left Feet"
1992–1993	By Way of the Stars	Annie Pyle	TV miniseries
1992–1993	Empty Nest	Sylvia, Agnes	Episodes: "Charley for President", "The Fracas in Vegas"
1993	Street Legal	Patricia Peters	Episode: "Pride and Prejudice"
1994	Phenom	Mrs. Long	Episode: "What's in a Vow?"
1994	Dave's World	Daisy	Episode: "Lost Weekend"
1994	The 5 Mrs. Buchanans	Aunt Francine	Episode: "Alex, Then and N.O.W."
1994	The X-Files	Dorothy	Episode: "Excelsis Dei"
1995	Platypus Man	Bella	Episode: "Sweet Denial"
1995	The Commish	Ardith Cannon	Episode: "Off Broadway: Part 2"
1995	The Ben Stiller Show	Gertude	Episode: "ZooTV at Night"
1995	The Crew	Mrs. Henderson	Episode: "The Sugar Shack"
1995	Murder, She Wrote	Sarah McCoy	Episode: "Home Care"
1995	Courthouse	Kate Downey	Episode: "Injustice for All"
1996	Road to Avonlea	Winifred Ward	Episode: "After the Ball Is Over"
1996	Rossini's Ghost	Rosalie (elder)	TV film
1996, 1998	Seinfeld	Mabel Choate	Episodes: "The Rye", "The Cadillac", "The Finale"
1997	Suddenly Susan	Mrs. Tidgely	Episode: "What a Card"
1997	Life with Roger	Aunt Charlotte	Episode: "The Boxer Rebellion"
1997	Players	Mrs. Davis	Episode: "Three of a Con"
1998	Clueless	Opal	Episode: "Friends"
1998	C-16: FBI	Miss Wilson	Episode: "The Art of War"
1998	Beyond Belief: Fact or Fiction	Mildred Grayson	Episode: "The Gift"
1998	Style & Substance	Elizabeth	Episode: "Chelsea's Ex"
1998	Forever Love	Martha Craddock	TV film
1998–2000	The Hughleys	Mrs. Fitch	Recurring role (seasons 1–2)
1999	The Simple Life of Noah Dearborn	Mrs. Lewis	TV film
1999	Da Vinci's Inquest	Viola McKnight	Episode: "A Nice Home in the Country"
2000	Port Charles	Leah Cochrane	Guest role
2001	ER	Georgia	Episode: "Witch Hunt"
2001	Bob Patterson	Laurie Evans	Episode: "Awards Bob"
2001	Bratty Babies	Maggie Winchester	TV film
2002	Charmed	Phoebe Halliwell (old)	Episode: "The Three Faces of Phoebe"
2002	Presidio Med	Joan Hart	Episode: "This Baby's Gonna Fly"
2006	Hannah Montana	Cathy	Episode: "Debt It Be"
2007	Cavemen	Mrs. Winston	Episode: "Pilot"
2009	Grey's Anatomy	Aunt Joyce	Episode: "Elevator Love Letter"
2009–2011	The Middle	Ginny Freehold	Recurring role (seasons 1–2)
