= The Sponge =

- Seinfeld episode
- Episode no.: Season 7 Episode 9
- Directed by: Andy Ackerman
- Written by: Peter Mehlman
- Production code: 709
- Original air date: December 7, 1995

Guest appearances
- Heidi Swedberg as Susan Ross; Scott Patterson as Billy; Jennifer Guthrie as Lena; David Byrd as Roger Hoffman; John Paragon as Cedric; Yul Vazquez as Bob; Ileen Getz as Organizer; Steven Hack as Walker #1; Patricia Bethune as Walker #3; Susan Moore as Monica

Episode chronology
← Previous "The Pool Guy"	Next → "The Gum"
- Seinfeld season 7

"The Sponge" is the 119th episode of the NBC sitcom Seinfeld. This was the ninth episode for the seventh season. It aired on December 7, 1995. In this episode, Kramer joins an AIDS walkathon without wearing a ribbon; Jerry gets a woman's number from Kramer's sponsors list; George must choose between keeping Jerry's secrets and being candid with Susan; and Elaine rearranges her sex life around conserving contraceptive sponges.

== Plot ==
Kramer signs up for an AIDS walk, vowing to make a bigger difference than people who "just wear a ribbon". Jerry spots Lena Small on Kramer's sponsors list, revealing her phone number. Jerry seizes this chance to call Lena and ask her out, while dodging the question of how he got her unlisted number.

Elaine needs to buy birth control before taking her boyfriend Billy to bed, only to learn that contraceptive sponges, her product of choice, were taken off-market. After hitting every store, she buys the last case of sponges in stock all across the West Side.

Susan is impressed by Jerry's size 31 pants, so George tells her Jerry's secret: he has been wearing size 32 all along while changing the tags. George immediately regrets his loose lips, but Susan gets upset that he wants to keep secrets from her. George takes her on a double date with Jerry and Lena to ease the tension, and they learn of Lena's charitable works and environmentalism. Jerry is paranoid that George would blab how he got Lena's number to Susan, but reluctantly loops George in, to be on the same page.

George immediately trades away Jerry's secret to Susan for forgiveness, earning him makeup sex. However, Susan has also run out of sponges. George has no choice but to beg Elaine for a sponge, to no avail, but this makes her rethink spending a sponge on Billy. She postpones sex until she has exhaustively vetted Billy's qualifications as "sponge-worthy".

To Jerry's dismay, gossip about Lena's phone number gets back to Lena herself. However, Lena does not mind what Jerry did, and he sours on Lena since he cannot have depraved sex with someone so virtuous. Jerry doubts Kramer's readiness for the AIDS walk, since climbing the apartment stairs tires him out, and he stays up the night before for a raucous poker game.

Susan convinces George to reluctantly use a condom for their makeup sex, but, just as George fears, he wastes his erection struggling to open the condom wrapper. Jerry, about to dump Lena, finds her closet heaped with stockpiled sponges. He reassesses her as depraved after all, only to find she cannot condone his false pants size.

Kramer gets a ribbon forced on him at the AIDS walk, but he defies this "ribbon bullying". This draws the wrath of fellow walkers, led by Bob and Cedric, who gang up on Kramer in an alley. Later, Jerry is unsurprised to see Kramer, battered and disheveled, crawl across the finish line.

Billy and Elaine are still amorous the morning after, but Elaine cannot spare a second sponge for him.

== Production ==
Peter Mehlman was inspired to write this episode when he heard that the extremely popular Today sponge was being taken off the market. His initial plan was to dovetail Elaine's hoarding of the Today sponge with Kramer and Newman trying to run a stock market scam, George and a girl agreeing to date for a week and then break up by mutual consent, and Jerry trying to conceal from Lena the fact that he got her number from an AIDS walk list. These additional plot threads were either drastically reworked or completely replaced. Mehlman had in fact once obtained a woman's unlisted number from an AIDS walk list. The idea of Jerry modifying the waist size on the tag of his pants was contributed by Jerry Seinfeld himself.

The "ribbon bullies" story was motivated by the Seinfeld crew's dislike for being expected to wear AIDS ribbons at the Emmy Awards. The AIDS walk scene was filmed on the Central Park set of the CBS Radford lot.

Elaine's statement that she's going to do a "hard target search of every drug store, general store, health store, grocery store in a 25-block radius" is a parody of a similar statement made by Samuel Gerard in the 1993 film The Fugitive.

== Option pricing ==
A paper by Avinash Dixit used this episode to explore an option value problem in determining the "spongeworthiness" of potential partners.
