= The Maestro (Seinfeld) =

- Seinfeld episode
- Episode no.: Season 7 Episode 3
- Directed by: Andy Ackerman
- Written by: Larry David
- Production code: 703
- Original air date: October 5, 1995

Guest appearances
- Heidi Swedberg as Susan Ross; Mark Metcalf as Maestro; Phil Morris as Jackie Chiles; Gary Yates as Security Guard; Tim Bagley as Evan Fain; Paul Michael as Ciccio; James Noah as Ned; Tim Bagley as Manager; Richard McGonagle as Mr. Star; Kenneth Ryan as Mr. Burns; Kymberly Newberry as Ms. Jordan; David Wendelman as Waiter

Episode chronology
← Previous "The Postponement"	Next → "The Wink"
- Seinfeld season 7

"The Maestro" is an episode of the NBC sitcom Seinfeld. It first aired on October 5, 1995. It was the series' 113th episode and third episode for the seventh season. In this episode, Elaine dates a conductor who only answers to "Maestro"; Jerry suspects the Maestro does not want him in Tuscany; a miraculous balm jeopardizes Kramer's personal injury lawsuit; and George arranges a seat for a security guard. Mark Metcalf plays the Maestro, while Phil Morris debuts as recurring character Jackie Chiles.

== Plot ==
Kramer's cutthroat lawyer Jackie Chiles predicts a lucrative jury verdict for Kramer getting scalded by Java World's coffee. Susan takes George to her uncle's clothing store, where he worries that the security guard must stand all day, despite everyone else's nonchalance.

Bob Cobb drops off an herbal balm for Kramer's burns. As conductor for an amateur community orchestra, Bob expects everyone to call him "Maestro". Having just returned from his house in Tuscany, the Maestro informs Jerry, unsolicited, that there are no vacancies there.

Elaine and the Maestro start dating. Sore that he is not held in the same regard as Leonard Bernstein, the Maestro does not exempt Elaine from addressing him formally, even during intimacy. Despite this, she adores his company, and becomes versed in classical music.

The balm heals Kramer before a doctor can examine his burns, and Jackie berates him for doing whatever the Maestro says. However, Java World is so anxious to settle that they do not ask for evidence. Eager to take what he can get, Kramer pounces on their offer of unlimited free coffee before the negotiators finish talking, leaving out monetary compensation to Jackie's horror. Kramer immediately guzzles free Java World coffee until he is frenetically overcaffeinated and thrown out.

Jerry does not want to rent in Tuscany, but goes hunting regardless to confirm his growing suspicion that the Maestro is lying to keep him out. In a shadowy Italian restaurant, Poppie's cousin, an opulently-dressed old man, offers Jerry a rental in Tuscany and does not take no for an answer.

George presses the guard to admit that he would not mind sitting, then picks out a chair for him. With Susan's uncle on vacation, George pulls rank as Susan's fiancé to give the grateful guard a rocking chair. Comfortably seated, the guard sleeps soundly through a robbery.

In idyllic Tuscany, Elaine and the Maestro's romantic getaway is spoiled when Jerry moves in across the way with Kramer in tow.

== Production ==
"The Maestro" was the first appearance of Jackie Chiles, a parody of Johnnie Cochran, played by Phil Morris. Morris and Cochran had visited the same barbershop in Los Angeles for years, and so Morris was very familiar with Cochran's personality and mannerisms. Jerry Seinfeld interrupted Morris' audition for the role by turning up the air conditioning and remarking "You're so funny you're making me sweat." The table reading for "The Maestro" was held on August 27, 1995, and it was filmed before a studio audience on August 30. Michael Richards' mispronunciation of the words "theater" and "caffè latte" was unscripted.

== Reception ==
"The Maestro" first aired on October 5, 1995. The episode earned a ratings share of 22.5/35.

== Superman reference ==
The Maestro's name is Bob Cobb. Bob Cobb is the original alias of Mon-El, a supporting character in Superman comics.

The name Bob Cobb would be used again by Larry David in the Curb Your Enthusiasm episode "Trick or Treat."

== Popular culture ==
Some critics of New York's "Standing is Tiring (SIT) Act", a proposed right to sit law, have ridiculed the legislation by comparing it to the scene where George provides a seat for the security guard. New York State Assembly member Karines Reyes, a supporter of the bill, responded by saying that the jokes were "funny", but the law would be reasonably applied.
