= Seinfeld season 7 =

Seinfeld
- Season 7
- DVD cover
- Showrunner: Larry David
- Starring: Jerry Seinfeld; Julia Louis-Dreyfus; Michael Richards; Jason Alexander
- No. of episodes: 24

Release
- Original network: NBC
- Original release: September 21, 1995 – May 16, 1996

Season chronology
- ← Previous; Season 6 Next → Season 8

The seventh season of Seinfeld, an American comedy television series created by Jerry Seinfeld and Larry David, began airing on September 21, 1995, and concluded on May 16, 1996, on NBC. It is the final season to involve Larry David, and the final season, save for "The Finale", to feature Seinfeld's stand-up routines.

== Production ==
Seinfeld was produced by Castle Rock Entertainment and aired on NBC in the United States. The executive producers were Larry David, George Shapiro, and Howard West with Tom Gammill and Max Pross as supervising producers. Bruce Kirschbaum was the executive consultant. This season was directed by Andy Ackerman.

The series was set predominantly in an apartment block on New York City's Upper West Side. The seventh season was shot and mostly filmed in CBS Studio Center in Studio City, California. The show features Jerry Seinfeld as himself, and a host of Jerry's friends and acquaintances, which include George Costanza, Elaine Benes, and Cosmo Kramer, portrayed by Jason Alexander, Julia Louis-Dreyfus and Michael Richards, respectively.

== Episodes ==
No. overall	No. in season	Title	Directed by	Written by	Original release date	Prod. code	US viewers (millions)
111	1	"The Engagement"	Andy Ackerman	Larry David	September 21, 1995	701	37.6
After they both break up with women for the slightest of reasons, George and Jerry agree to grow up and take relationships seriously, inspiring George to go back to Susan Ross and earnestly propose marriage. Kramer's warnings about married life spook Jerry into going back to business as usual, leaving George engaged on his own. A neighbor's dog barks incessantly every night at Elaine's new apartment, and, in desperation, she enlists Newman and Kramer's help to kidnap the dog and take it to a new home upstate.
112	2	"The Postponement"	Andy Ackerman	Larry David	September 28, 1995	702	34.5
Elaine secretly envies and resents George for getting engaged before her. She assumes that she can confide her jealousy to a helpful rabbi, not expecting that the rabbi has no concept of confidentiality. George loses his nerve for marrying Susan in just months, and Jerry cavalierly advises him to postpone the wedding, knowing full well that he cannot stand up to Susan. After righteously vowing that he would turn in Jerry for murder, Kramer goes to see Plan 9 from Outer Space with Jerry while smuggling in a latte down his pants.
113	3	"The Maestro"	Andy Ackerman	Larry David	October 5, 1995	703	34.6
An amateur orchestra conductor demands to be addressed as "Maestro" by all, and Elaine falls for him despite his self-importance. Cutthroat lawyer Jackie Chiles files Kramer's personal injury lawsuit for getting scalded by Java World coffee, but their lucrative payout is jeopardized when a miraculous balm from the Maestro heals Kramer prematurely. The Maestro advises Jerry that no rental vacancies are available in Tuscany, goading Jerry to investigate the truth of the matter despite not wanting to rent there. George arranges a seat for a store security guard after seeing that he must stand all day.
114	4	"The Wink"	Andy Ackerman	Tom Gammill & Max Pross	October 12, 1995	704	32.3
Jerry's healthy grapefruit breakfast squirts into George's eye, which develops an involuntary wink in irritation. George fails to vouch for coworker Mr. Morgan's conduct due to his conspiratorial winking. While George has custody of a birthday card the Yankees signed for Steinbrenner, Kramer takes George's wink as invitation to sell the card, which gets bought for a young fan in the hospital. In order to fake a meat-heavy diet for his girlfriend's approval, Jerry finds outlandish hiding places for mouthfuls of meat. While dating her wake-up caller, Elaine hides out at his home overnight from a pack of dogs.
115	5	"The Hot Tub"	Andy Ackerman	Gregg Kavet & Andy Robin	October 19, 1995	705	32.6
George, trying to look busy at work by being visibly annoyed, gets sent on break to entertain foul-mouthed guests from the Houston Astros, who rub off on him. While struggling to write sales copy for "Himalayan walking shoes", Elaine hosts Jean-Paul, a marathon runner from Trinidad and Tobago, who once overslept for a race at the Olympics. Jerry imposes the chore of waking Jean-Paul on Elaine, then casts doubt on her ability to do so; when Jean-Paul gets evicted from Elaine's building, Jerry takes matters into his own hands. Kramer puts a hot tub in his living room, but gets hypothermia from a long soak that goes awry.
116	6	"The Soup Nazi"	Andy Ackerman	Spike Feresten	November 2, 1995	706	33.1
Elaine needs Kramer to stand guard over an antique armoire she bought off the sidewalk, but Kramer is powerless to stop street toughs from hauling it away. George looks down on Jerry and his girlfriend's excessive displays of smooching and baby talk, and gets motivated to mock them to their face by mimicking them with Susan. Jerry values the staggeringly good soups served by the "Soup Nazi" so much that he will enforce the Soup Nazi's draconian rules at everyone else's expense. Elaine presumptuously flouts the Soup Nazi's rules, starting a spiteful feud.
117	7	"The Secret Code"	Andy Ackerman	Alec Berg & Jeff Schaffer	November 9, 1995	707	33.9
Because his ATM code must be kept secret, George will not make an exception for even Susan. Elaine meets a man who cannot remember her, a quality so fascinating that she overlooks his dismally depressing temperament. Jerry and George get saddled with suffering through Elaine's dinner with J. Peterman, but only George fails to make an excuse to leave, and gets himself stuck at Peterman's mother's deathbed. Jerry goes to film a commercial for "Leapin' Larry"'s appliance store, but his foot falls asleep at the wrong time. Kramer, listening in on fire dispatchers, reawakens his childhood dream to be a fireman.
118	8	"The Pool Guy"	Andy Ackerman	David Mandel	November 16, 1995	708	33.4
Jerry suggests that Elaine make friends with Susan, inadvertently antagonizing George, who can no longer compartmentalize his private life as a result. A newly-fired pool guy from Jerry's new health club starts hanging around Jerry uninvited, only to get rehired after Jerry turns down his friendship. Kramer gets a new phone number which is too close to the Moviefone number, and starts obligingly looking up movie showtimes for Moviefone customers who misdial him. When Susan becomes part of George's friends circle, George turns vengeful over the death of "Independent George" at his friends' hands.
119	9	"The Sponge"	Andy Ackerman	Peter Mehlman	December 7, 1995	709	32.3
Kramer joins an AIDS walkathon, but considers himself above wearing an awareness ribbon. Jerry gets Lena Small's unlisted phone number from Kramer's sponsors list so that he can ask her out. Because contraceptive sponges have been taken off the market, Elaine hoards an entire case, and must rigorously vet her boyfriend's qualifications as "sponge-worthy". George is torn between not keeping secrets from Susan, and proving that he can be trusted with Jerry's embarrassing secrets. Discovering that Lena is a veritable saint, Jerry assumes that he cannot have depraved sex with her.
120	10	"The Gum"	Andy Ackerman	Tom Gammill & Max Pross	December 14, 1995	710	31.4
Kramer campaigns to revitalize an old movie theater with Lloyd Braun's help. Since Lloyd was freshly institutionalized for a nervous breakdown, Kramer demands that everyone humor his every whim in support, and forces Jerry to savor some unappealing imported chewing gum from Lloyd. Elaine, trying to avoid leading Lloyd on like before, instead suffers mishaps that make her appear more lascivious than ever. George's unconcealed glee at Lloyd's downfall, and the unbelievable misfortunes that befall him, worry childhood friend Deena as warning signs of his own impending breakdown.
121	11	"The Rye"	Andy Ackerman	Carol Leifer	January 4, 1996	711	35.1
Elaine must take baby steps with her jazz club saxophonist boyfriend because he balks at oral sex, but Jerry takes matters out of her hands by overselling the couple as "hot and heavy". George's parents meet his future in-laws for dinner; ignorant of refined dining customs, they bring a loaf of marble rye which gets neglected, and steal it back out of spite. Not needing bad blood between the families, George needs to replace the loaf behind the Rosses' back, so he enlists Kramer to take the Rosses out on a romantic hansom cab ride. Jerry resorts to robbing an old woman for her marble rye.
122	12	"The Caddy"	Andy Ackerman	Gregg Kavet & Andy Robin	January 25, 1996	712	32.0
After locking his keys in his car at work, George accidentally becomes the frontrunner for a promotion because his car is ever-present. Elaine tries to shame her archenemy Sue Ellen Mischke (Brenda Strong), a high society heiress, for going braless all her life, but inspires Sue Ellen to wear an exposed bra instead. Kramer breaks into George's car to get it cleaned, but crashes it while gaping at Sue Ellen. With his pro golf career ended before it can begin, Kramer gets his trusted caddy's advice to take Sue Ellen to court. George skips work while relying on his car to cover for him, and gets declared missing and presumed dead.
123	13	"The Seven"	Andy Ackerman	Alec Berg & Jeff Schaffer	February 1, 1996	713	37.1
Elaine impulsively offers up her vintage girls' bike for relief from neck strain, but unexpectedly owes Kramer for curing her. When Kramer's cure backfires, only Newman can settle the bike's rightful ownership. Kramer, newly conscious that he takes Jerry's food for granted, starts keeping a ledger for accountability. George pushes unsolicited baby names on Susan's expectant cousin, but she instead steals "Seven" from him, which he was saving for his own child in homage to Mickey Mantle's jersey number. Jerry, always seeing his girlfriend wearing the same dress, obsesses over catching her wearing different clothes.
124	14	"The Cadillac"	Andy Ackerman	Larry David & Jerry Seinfeld	February 8, 1996	714	35.9
125	15	"The Cadillac"	Andy Ackerman	Larry David & Jerry Seinfeld	February 8, 1996	717	35.9
Jerry's latest gig has paid enough to buy his father a fully-featured Cadillac sedan. Elaine cozies up to Jerry because he has Cadillac money. In Florida, Morty's fellow condo board members, led by Jack Klompus, use the Seinfelds' newfound ostentatious wealth as an excuse to impeach Morty for alleged embezzlement. A cable guy is waiting to be let into Kramer's apartment, and Kramer realizes that he can turn the tables in revenge for cable guys making him wait for service, locking them in games of cat and mouse. George learns that he could have been introduced to Marisa Tomei, who likes quirky and bald men, through Elaine's friend, and refuses to let this chance go despite being engaged. George conspires with Elaine for the first time to concoct an alibi for meeting Tomei behind Susan's back. Morty's impeachment hinges on the vote of Mabel Choate, who turns out to be the victim of Jerry's marble rye theft back in New York.
126	16	"The Shower Head"	Andy Ackerman	Peter Mehlman & Marjorie Gross	February 15, 1996	715	32.3
Jerry's parents stay in New York to put off moving to a new condo. To reinstate his "buffer zone", Jerry schemes to force them out of Uncle Leo's apartment by making his uncle dump his girlfriend. Elaine cannot get cleared for a work trip to Africa due to opium in her urine, putting not just the trip but her job in jeopardy. Low-flow showerheads are installed in Jerry's building, making Kramer turn to illicit means to shower normally. George realizes that nothing is keeping his parents in New York, and entices them to move far away to Florida. They resolve to buy a condo just to spite the Seinfelds.
127	17	"The Doll"	Andy Ackerman	Tom Gammill & Max Pross	February 22, 1996	716	32.9
Susan's old roommate gives Jerry a package that she wants him to be careful with. Frank turns George's room into a billiard room and Kramer challenges him to a game of billiards where the space is a bit tight. Jerry is enthusiastic about a new toothbrush. Susan has a doll that looks like George's mother. Elaine tries to replace an autographed picture of "the other guy", for "the Maestro" that was damaged while they were in Tuscany.
128	18	"The Friars Club"	Andy Ackerman	David Mandel	March 7, 1996	718	32.7
George successfully delays his wedding. Jerry goes out with Susan's best friend. Jerry loses a jacket he "borrowed" for dinner at the Friars Club. Kramer tries to duplicate the sleeping patterns of Da Vinci. Peterman hires a deaf employee (Rob Schneider) and Elaine suffers the consequences, when she gets loaded with most of his work.
129	19	"The Wig Master"	Andy Ackerman	Spike Feresten	April 4, 1996	719	30.5
Jerry uses Elaine to prove that a sales clerk is wrong about his looking at an expensive jacket. Elaine is picked up by the clerk after he leads her on with the promise of a big discount. George has an unwanted house guest. George discovers why a parking lot is so cheap, when he finds a used condom in his car. Kramer unwittingly becomes a "pimp."
130	20	"The Calzone"	Andy Ackerman	Alec Berg & Jeff Schaffer	April 25, 1996	720	28.5
George becomes Steinbrenner's pet, when he shares an eggplant calzone with him. Kramer is raving about wearing clothes "straight out of the dryer." Elaine's boyfriend is dating her without really ever asking her out. Jerry takes advantage of his girlfriend's ability to get anything she wants. Kramer starts using an oven for his clothing.
131	21	"The Bottle Deposit"	Andy Ackerman	Gregg Kavet & Andy Robin	May 2, 1996	721	32.4
132	22	"The Bottle Deposit"	Andy Ackerman	Gregg Kavet & Andy Robin	May 2, 1996	722	32.4
George doesn't hear the details on an important project that Wilhelm wants him to champion. Elaine gets into a bidding war at an auction with Sue Ellen Mischke, the Oh Henry! candy heiress, over a set of golf clubs owned by JFK. Consequently, she spends a bit more than she was authorized by Peterman. Kramer collects used pop bottles and cans so he can take them to Michigan where the refund is doubled. Jerry takes his car to a fanatical car care mechanic (Brad Garrett). Jerry's car is stolen by the mechanic. Wilhelm is delighted with the job George did on the project; however, he has no idea what he did or how he did it. Kramer spots Jerry's car in Ohio. George is sent to a mental hospital by Steinbrenner because George's work on the project makes Steinbrenner think he is mentally unstable. Newman finds a farmer's house, complete with the proverbial daughter.
133	23	"The Wait Out"	Andy Ackerman	Story by : Peter Mehlman & Matt Selman; Teleplay by : Peter Mehlman	May 9, 1996	723	29.9
George makes an off-hand remark to a married couple with a shaky relationship, leading to their breakup. Elaine starts driving again and almost makes Jerry sick. Kramer starts wearing jeans that are so tight that he cannot get them off. Elaine and Jerry make plans to move in on the separated couple.
134	24	"The Invitations"	Andy Ackerman	Larry David	May 16, 1996	724	33.2
George tries to think of a way out of his relationship with Susan before the wedding. Elaine suggests he start smoking, and Kramer suggests he ask Susan for a pre-nuptial agreement. Jerry nearly gets hit by a car but is saved by his female equivalent, Jeannie. Jerry thinks he is in love with Jeannie and proposes to her. Kramer tries to cash in on a bank's offer to pay a customer $100 if the teller doesn't say "hello". Susan dies from licking the glue on 250 cheap wedding invitation envelopes.

== Reception ==
The review aggregator website Rotten Tomatoes reported a 100% approval rating with an average rating of 9.3/10, based on 8 critic reviews.

== Honors ==
TV Guide named it the 41st greatest television season of all time. It was one of four Seinfeld seasons on the list.
