= The Rye =

- Seinfeld episode
- Episode no.: Season 7 Episode 11
- Directed by: Andy Ackerman
- Written by: Carol Leifer
- Production code: 711
- Original air date: January 4, 1996

Guest appearances
- Jerry Stiller as Frank Costanza; Estelle Harris as Estelle Costanza; Heidi Swedberg as Susan Ross; Grace Zabriskie as Mrs. Ross; Warren Frost as Mr. Ross; Frances Bay as Mabel; Jeff Yagher as John; Leonard Lightfoot as Clyde; Don Amendolia as Dennis; Kathryn Kates as Counter Woman; Steve Ireland as Music Guy; Dean Fortunato as Manager

Episode chronology
← Previous "The Gum"	Next → "The Caddy"
- Seinfeld season 7

"The Rye" is the 121st episode of the NBC sitcom Seinfeld. It was the 11th episode of the seventh season, originally airing on January 4, 1996. It was the final episode of the series to be written by American comedian Carol Leifer. In this episode, Elaine must take baby steps with her saxophonist boyfriend because he balks at oral sex; only a loaf of marble rye can undo George's parents burning bridges with his in-laws; and Kramer becomes a hansom cab driver.

== Plot ==
Elaine swoons over her boyfriend John, a talented jazz club saxophonist, but wishes he did not shy away from oral sex. Jerry casually oversells John and Elaine as a "hot and heavy" couple to John's bandmate Clyde, but Elaine worries that this will scare John off if it gets back to him. Bargain-hunting, Kramer buys a carload of bulk foods from a warehouse club. A hansom cab driver neighbor goes on vacation, and lets Kramer take over his job.

George's parents go meet Susan's parents for the first time, and Frank is sure that bringing a loaf of select marble rye will impress. Over dinner, the Costanzas make nitpicks that show off their ignorance of cuisine. The Rosses do not serve the rye, and Frank steals it back out of spite.

Not needing bad blood between the families, George plans to smuggle a replacement rye into the Rosses' kitchen as though it was there all along. Jerry realizes that Kramer can get the Rosses out of the way on a romantic hansom cab ride, and volunteers to bring the new rye from the bakery. Meanwhile, Kramer, inundated with food, feeds his cans of "Beef-a-reeno" to Rusty, the cab driver's horse.

As George sees the delighted Rosses off with Kramer, an old woman beats Jerry to the last marble rye at the bakery. He fails to coax, wheedle, or barter for the rye, and finally stoops to robbery. Meanwhile, everyone in the cab ends up downwind from Rusty's canned food-induced flatulence, sending the Rosses home early before Jerry can arrive. George, stuck upstairs with the Rosses, cannot catch Jerry's rye thrown from below, and finally reels it up on a fishing pole, just as the Rosses walk in.

To Elaine's horror, "Hot and Heavy" gets memorialized as the title of John's new song. Jerry advises her to confront John, despite him getting scouted by record label producers that night. John turns out to be eager to heat up their relationship, and gamely takes Elaine home for oral sex before his performance. Out of inexperience, he overexerts himself and can only blow his chops back at the club, leaving the producers and Elaine unimpressed.

== Production ==
Writer Carol Leifer got the story of visitors bringing a rye bread and then taking it back after the hosts forgot to serve it from a high school friend. The plot point of Jerry having to steal a marble rye bread from the woman ahead of him in line at the bakery was contributed by Seinfeld co-creator Larry David.

Elaine's voice-over in the opening scene was recorded by actress Julia Louis-Dreyfus beforehand and played back during the filming of the scene so that she could synchronize her facial expressions and movements with the narration. Many of the outdoor scenes were filmed at Paramount Studio, where Jerry Seinfeld started a massive snowball fight with the entire cast and crew using the fake snow.

In initial drafts of the episode's script, Kramer fed the horse excessive amounts of Chef Boyardee Beefaroni, causing its flatulence. However, Boyardee refused to allow their product to be portrayed in such a fashion, leading to the creation of the fictional product "Beef-a-reeno".

== Critical reception ==
Sara Lewis Dunne, in the book Seinfeld: Master of Its Domain, comments on possible reasons why the Costanzas and the Rosses clash:

Dinner party "rules" seem to baffle all the regular characters on Seinfeld... [I]n this episode we see a peculiarly New York culture clash between the schlubby Costanzas and the ritzy Rosses. Much has been written about whether the Costanzas, whose name "sounds" Italian, are really Jewish, with George, according to both Carla Johnson and Jon Stratton (in this volume), as the ultimate schlemiel. A food called Schnitzel's Marble Rye certainly would seem to fit into the ethnic tradition that would offer it as a dinner-party gift, and its rejection by the Rosses seems an affront, which could easily be read as an ethnic affront, to Frank Costanza. When I first saw this episode, I (and probably many other viewers as well) was reminded of Jackie Mason's summation of the difference between Jews and Gentiles: Jews eat and Gentiles drink, and the Rosses are usually seen with a drink in their hands.

David Sims of The A.V. Club was underwhelmed by the characterization of the Rosses in the episode, "especially with the juicy setup of them meeting the equally bonkers Costanzas." He felt that the season four episode "The Cheever Letters" was stronger in this regard, and that "the whole thing feels more like your classic in-law dinner from Hell rather than the special kind of crazy we might come to expect. But 'The Rye' redeems itself somewhat with the much wackier sight of Jerry stealing a marble rye from an old lady and trying to toss it to George on a second-floor [sic] window..."
