= The Pool Guy =

- Seinfeld episode
- Episode no.: Season 7 Episode 8
- Directed by: Andy Ackerman
- Written by: David Mandel
- Production code: 708
- Original air date: November 16, 1995

Guest appearances
- Wayne Knight as Newman; Carlos Jacott as Ramon; Heidi Swedberg as Susan Ross; Billy Williams as Usher; Alec Mapa as Paul; Dom Magwili as Dustin; Russ Leatherman as Mr. Moviefone (voice, uncredited)

Episode chronology
← Previous "The Secret Code"	Next → "The Sponge"
- Seinfeld season 7

"The Pool Guy" is the 118th episode of the NBC sitcom Seinfeld. This was the eighth episode of the seventh season. It aired on November 16, 1995. The end credit states "In Memory of our Friend Rick Bolden". Rick Bolden was one of the musicians who worked on the show's theme song.

In this episode, George can no longer compartmentalize his private life when Elaine befriends Susan; Jerry cannot ghost the former pool guy from his health club; and Kramer's new phone number gets many misdialed calls for Moviefone.

== Plot ==
Because Elaine has run out of female friends, Jerry suggests that she befriend Susan for an outing. As Kramer foresees, George is unnerved at Susan intruding upon the "sanctuary" of his friends circle, making his "worlds collide". Ramon, the pool guy at Jerry's new health club, gets fired, and starts hanging around Jerry uninvited, first in public and then at home. Kramer gets a new phone number which is too close to the Moviefone number, causing many people to misdial him for movie showtimes. He starts obligingly looking up showtimes in the newspaper for them.

George is further agitated when Susan starts talking like Elaine, while also planning a movie with everyone. He rants that his friends are killing the "Independent George" they all know, by forcing him to be "Relationship George" all the time. When Susan takes George's place in a Monk's booth with his friends, the other shoe drops for George, sending him off to eat alone at Reggie's again.

Unable to shake Ramon, Jerry firmly turns down his friendship, angering him. Ramon gets rehired, and starts inconveniencing Jerry at every turn. Harassed by Ramon while swimming, Jerry drags him into the pool just as Newman does a cannonball dive overhead. Ramon gets knocked out, and both Jerry and Newman would rather risk his death than perform mouth-to-mouth resuscitation. They both get banned from the club.

George comes home to a note saying that Susan went to see Chunnel with Elaine and Jerry. He calls Moviefone for showtimes, not knowing he reached Kramer, who answers as a fake phone menu in "Mr. Moviefone"'s voice. George vengefully leaves to confront everyone before hearing the full showtimes, and goes to the wrong theater, making a nuisance of himself. Meanwhile, Jerry and Elaine talk through the movie, and Susan realizes that their company is unbearably tedious. As she writes them off, George is hauled off by security, still ranting.

The real Mr. Moviefone tracks down Kramer for stealing his business, and menacingly lets Kramer choose his fate from a menu of options.

== Production ==
The episode's Jerry plot was considerably altered from writer David Mandel's original concept, in which Jerry and Ramon were shown innocently and mutually developing a friendly acquaintanceship at the health club prior to the downhill slope their relationship takes. Moreover, Mandel wanted Ramon to be a small Hispanic man, intending to find humor in the obvious social mismatch between Jerry and Ramon. Watching a video of playwright/performing artist Danny Hoch, he was impressed with how Hoch did 15 different Hispanic voices; Hoch was cast as Ramon and did the table read for the episode. However, Hoch eventually objected to what he felt was ethnic stereotyping in the way his character was written. According to Hoch, Jerry Seinfeld joked that they should do the next scene in blackface. The part was eventually given to Carlos Jacott instead, who gave a more mentally unhinged portrayal of Ramon than was originally planned. The Seinfeld crew decided to focus on that and drop the Hispanic angle.

The pool scene was filmed at the YMCA in Hollywood. Wayne Knight was uncomfortable at the prospect of wearing a bathing suit for the scene due to the level of bodily exposure, so the crew came up with the idea of him wearing a modest, comically archaic swimming outfit. The idea of Jerry and Newman being unwilling to give Ramon mouth-to-mouth resuscitation was contributed by Seinfeld creators Larry David and Jerry Seinfeld.

The footage of the fictional movie "Chunnel" was taken from The American President. George's line while the movie plays behind him, "I know you're in there laughing at me, laughing and lying!" was taken from the girlfriend of one of David Mandel's friends; she shouted the line outside a building during a drunken rant. The scene at Reggie's is actually stock footage from the episode "The Soup".

Mr. Moviefone was voiced by Russ Leatherman, the real Mr. Moviefone; Leatherman was unable to be present for the filming, so the brief shot of his body is another actor.

== Reception ==
The episode won 'Best Episodic Comedy' at the Writers Guild of America Awards 1996.
