= Phil Morris (actor) =

American actor (born 1959)

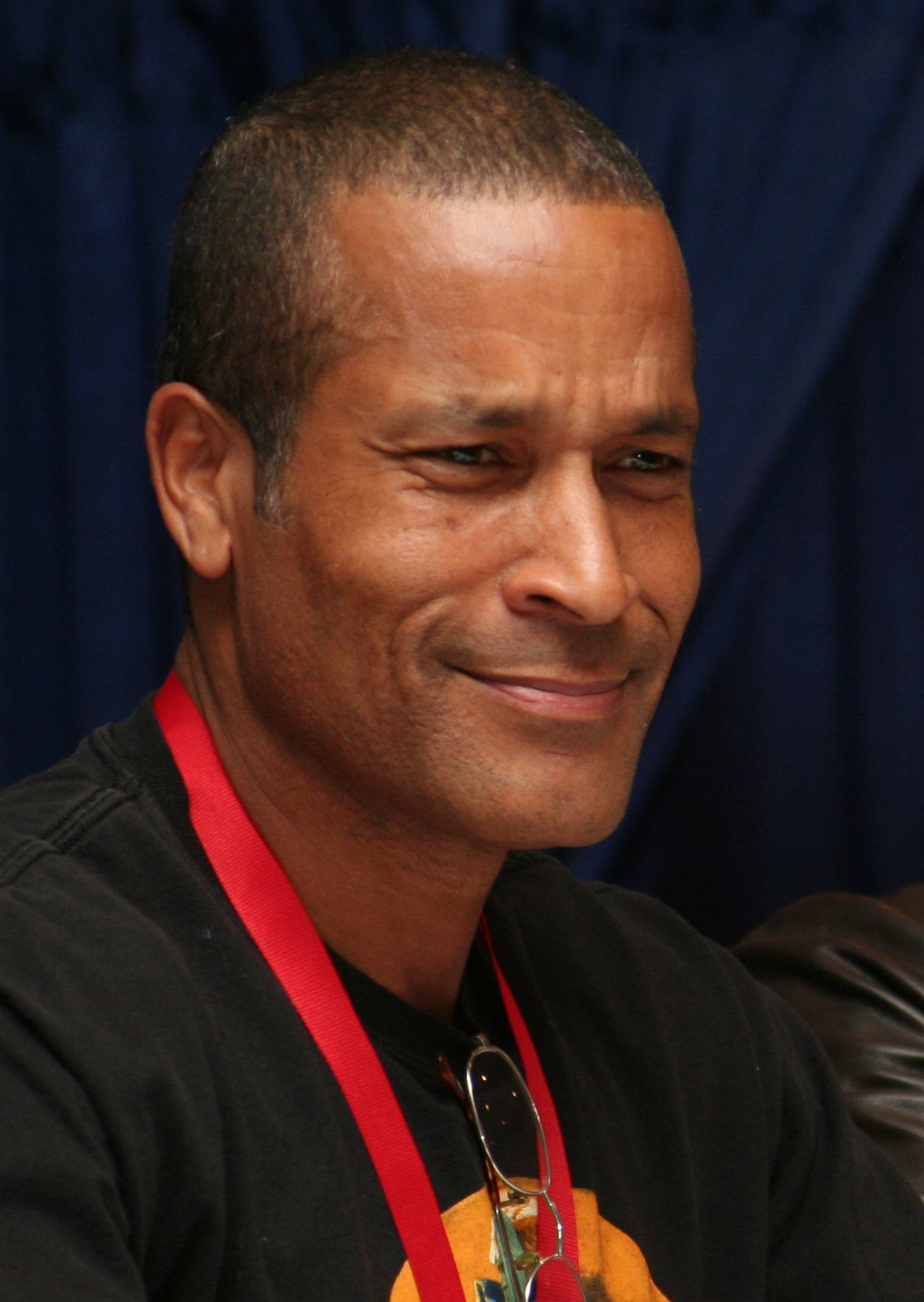
- Morris at the 2009 New York Comic Con
- Born: April 4, 1959 (age 67); Iowa City, Iowa, U.S.
- Occupation: Actor
- Years active: 1966–present
- Spouse: Carla Gittelson (m. 1983)
- Children: 2
- Father: Greg Morris
- Relatives: Iona Morris (sister); Francis Williams (grandfather)

Phil Morris (born April 4, 1959) is an American film and television actor. He played Jackie Chiles in Seinfeld, Martian Manhunter in Smallville, and Silas Stone in Doom Patrol. As a voice actor, he is known for voicing Dr. Sweet in Atlantis: The Lost Empire and Doc Saturday in The Secret Saturdays.

== Early life ==
Morris is the son of actor Greg Morris (1933–1996) and Leona Keyes. He is also the younger brother of actress Iona Morris. He is a practitioner of Wing Chun under Shifu Hawkins Cheung.

== Career ==
Morris's first acting role was as a child in the 1966 Star Trek episode "Miri", filmed at Desilu Productions, the studio that also produced Mission: Impossible, where his father worked. He made his feature film debut in a small role in Star Trek III: The Search for Spock and later guest-starred in Babylon 5, Star Trek: Deep Space Nine, and Star Trek: Voyager.

In the mid-1980s, Morris portrayed law student (later attorney) Tyrone Jackson in The Young and the Restless. In the 1990s, after starring in Andriana furs commercials Morris played a recurring character, the Johnnie Cochran-inspired defense attorney Jackie Chiles, in the comedy series Seinfeld. He had observed Cochran for years at a shared Los Angeles barber shop and said the attorney was flattered by the portrayal. The episode "The Abstinence" depicts Chiles suing a tobacco company, which Morris said he took great pleasure in, having been made fun of his whole life due to having the same name as the tobacco brand Philip Morris. Morris also co-starred in the 1980s revival of Mission: Impossible as Grant Collier, son of Barney Collier, the character his father had played in the original series. He grew up watching the original series and regarded its lead, Peter Graves, as a mentor and friend until Graves's death in 2010. He voiced Dr. Sweet in Disney's Atlantis: The Lost Empire (2001) and its 2003 sequel Atlantis: Milo's Return. He guest-starred as a college professor in The Fresh Prince of Bel-Air and played Dr. Clay Spencer in Girlfriends.

In 2007, Morris began portraying Martian Manhunter in Smallville. Morris, a longtime DC Comics reader, said his familiarity with the character helped him win the role, and the producers used his more mature presence to ground the series. He returned to the role through the seventh, eighth, and ninth seasons, including the episodes "Absolute Justice" and "Checkmate".

As a voice actor, Morris voiced the villains Imperiex in Legion of Super Heroes, and Vandal Savage in Justice League and Justice League: Doom. He voiced W'Kabi in the animated series Black Panther. He appeared in one episode each of the series CSI: Miami and Seven Days. Morris also was the voice of Paul the Apostle in Zondervan's The Bible Experience. Morris made a cameo appearance as Miles Dyson in photographs in the television series Terminator: The Sarah Connor Chronicles. He provided the voice of the character Doc Saturday in the animated show The Secret Saturdays. He also played a major supporting role in the PlayStation 2 game Ratchet: Deadlocked, as Merc, one of the combat bots that accompany the main character Ratchet. He also voiced characters in The PJs. According to Morris, he stood in for co-creator and star Eddie Murphy when Murphy was unavailable. Morris voiced Hansen and Glenn in the animated film Dead Space: Downfall. He played Delroy Jones in the TV One series Love That Girl!, Saint Walker in the Cartoon Network series Green Lantern: The Animated Series, and Ultra Richard in the Cartoon Hangover series SuperF*ckers.

From 2019 to 2023, Morris played the scientist Silas Stone, father of Cyborg, in the DC Universe and HBO Max series Doom Patrol. A lifelong comic book collector, he said he based the performance on the Cyborg comics and other DC titles rather than earlier screen portrayals. In 2025, he reprised the role of Jackie Chiles for the music video of Ice Nine Kills' Joker-themed single "The Laugh Track".

== Personal life ==
Morris has been married to interior designer Carla Gittelson since 1983. They have two children.

== Filmography ==
=== Film ===
Year	Title	Role	Notes
1984	Star Trek III: The Search for Spock	Trainee Foster	
1987	P.I. Private Investigations	Eddie Gordon	
1996	Jingle All the Way	Gale Force	
1997	Wag the Dog	Co-Pilot	
1998	Devil in the Flesh	Detective Joe Rosales	Direct-to-video
1998	Clay Pigeons	Agent Reynard	
2000	3 Strikes	Mr. Libowitz	
2001	Atlantis: The Lost Empire	Dr. Joshua Strongbear Sweet (voice)	
2003	Atlantis: Milo's Return	Dr. Joshua Strongbear Sweet (voice)	Direct-to-video
2004	Comic Book: The Movie	Phil Morris	
2005	Frostbite	J.P. Millhouse	
2006	Abominable	Deputy McBride	
2007	Underdog	Supershep (voice)	
2008	Meet the Spartans	Messenger	
2008	Justice League: The New Frontier	King Faraday (voice)	Direct-to-video
2008	Dead Space: Downfall	Hansen (voice)	Direct-to-video
2009	Black Dynamite	Saheed	
2011	Stonerville	Clay Redding	Direct-to-video
2012	Justice League: Doom	Vandal Savage (voice)	Direct-to-video
2015	Lego DC Comics Super Heroes: Justice League vs. Bizarro League	Green Arrow, Hawkman (voice)	Direct-to-video
2016	Lego DC Comics Super Heroes: Justice League – Cosmic Clash	Vandal Savage (voice)	Direct-to-video
2016	Bling	Additional voices	Direct-to-video
2016	Scooby-Doo! and WWE: Curse of the Speed Demon	Walter Qualls (voice)	Direct-to-video
2016	Officer Downe	Zen Master Flash (voice)	
2017	All I Want for Christmas Is You	Bud (voice)	Direct-to-video
2017	The Star	Balthazar, Miller (voice)	
2018	Teen Titans Go! To the Movies	Red Carpet Announcer, Doomsday Device (voice)	
2020	Superman: Red Son	James Olsen (voice)	Direct-to-video
2020	Curious George: Go West, Go Wild!	Frank Stetson (voice)	Direct-to-video
2023	Strays	Bubsy	

=== Television ===
Year	Title	Role	Notes
1966	Star Trek: The Original Series	Boy	Episode: "Miri"
1980	Vega$	Tate	Episode: "Lost Monday"
1981	Mr. Merlin	Sam, Kid	4 episodes
1984	Hotel	Ken Foster	Episode: "Encores"
1985	Brothers	'Bobo'	Episode: "A Greasepaint Smile"
1985	Webster	Calvin	Episode: "Great Expectations"
1986	Knight Rider	Perata's Lieutenant	Episode: "Knight Flight to Freedom"
1986	The Young and the Restless	Tyrone Jackson	13 episodes
1986–1988	It's a Living	Jason	4 episodes
1987–1988	Marblehead Manor	Jerry Stockton	Main role
1988	227	Darren Montagne	Episode: "The Butler Did It"
1988	Cheers	Exterminator #2	Episode: "Bar Wars"
1988–1990	Mission: Impossible	Grant Collier	Main role
1990	Lucky Chances	Steven Dimes	Miniseries
1990–1991	WIOU	Eddie Brock	Main role
1993	Murder, She Wrote	David Salt	Episode: "A Virtual Murder"
1993–1998	Seinfeld	Spokesman of David Dinkins, Jackie Chiles	6 episodes
1993	The Fresh Prince of Bel-Air	Professor Scott Burton	Episode: "Take My Cousin... Please"
1994	Tracks of Glory	Marshall W. 'Major' Taylor	Miniseries
1995	Pointman	Hightower	Episode: "Adios Roberto"
1995	Living Single	Preston August	Episode: "Legal Briefs"
1995–1996	The Twisted Tales of Felix the Cat	Additional voices	7 episodes
1995–1997	Diagnosis: Murder	Roger Nelson, Jim Kesler	2 episodes
1996	Babylon 5	Bill Trainor	Episode: "Severed Dreams"
1996	The Wayans Bros.	Parker	Episode: "Movin' on Up"
1996	Lush Life	Wallace	Episode: "The Lush Ex-Posures"
1996–97	Melrose Place	Walter	7 episodes
1996–1997	Martin	Jim Bozack, Sterling Sweets	2 episodes
1996–1997	Star Trek: Deep Space Nine	Thopok, Remata'Klan	2 episodes
1997	JAG	Captain Koonan	Episode: "Force Recon"
1997	The Jamie Foxx Show	Ron	Episode: "Little Red Corvette"
1997	The Steve Harvey Show	Trent Underwood	Episode: "Love with Interest"
1997	Hangin' with Mr. Cooper	Fernando	Episode: "The Spa"
1997	In the House	Dr. Goldwire	4 episodes
1998	The Tony Danza Show	Dale Turner	Episode: "Sue You"
1998–1999	Love Boat: The Next Wave	Will Sanders	Main role
1999	Moesha	Joe Scott	2 episodes
1999	Beverly Hills, 90210	Detective Hayes	Episode: "The Phantom Menace"
1999	Star Trek: Voyager	Lieutenant John Kelly	Episode: "One Small Step"
1999–2001	The PJs	Thurgood Stubbs (voice)	17 episodes
2000	Any Day Now	Brian Harmon	Episode: "Life"
2000–2001	Men in Black: The Series	Additional voices	4 episodes
2001	Seven Days	AF Colonel Beekman	Episode: "The Final Countdown"
2001	Girlfriends	Dr. Clay Spencer	4 episodes
2002–2003	Justice League	Vandal Savage, Gorilla General (voice)	7 episodes
2003	Static Shock	Jonathan Vale (voice)	2 episodes
2003	Wanda at Large	Bradley Grimes	7 episodes
2003	Clifford the Big Red Dog	Deputy Wilson (voice)	Episode: "Food for Thought"
2003–2007	Kim Possible	Lieutenant Franklin, Infinity Guy, Falsetto Jones, Jake (voice)	6 episodes
2004	The Tracy Morgan Show	Kenny Bradley	Episode: "The Sporting Life"
2004	Still Standing	Dr. Holden	Episode: "Still Going First"
2004	Quintuplets	Mark	Episode: "Where Are They Now?"
2004–2007	Danny Phantom	Damon Gray (voice)	5 episodes
2005	All of Us	Eric Calhoun	Episode: "Not So Wonderful News"
2005	Dave the Barbarian	Terrence Winkie, Judge (voice)	Episode: "Floral Derangement"
2005	Fat Actress	Man At Counter	Episode: "Big Butts"
2005	JAG	Captain Max Engler	Episode: "Bridging the Gulf"
2005	Will & Grace	Dr. Norman	Episode: "The Blond Leading the Blind"
2006	NCIS	Captain Martino	Episode: "Deception"
2006	Loonatics Unleashed	Additional voices	3 episodes
2006–2007	American Dragon: Jake Long	Colonel Hank Carter (voice)	2 episodes
2006–2010	Smallville	John Jones	11 episodes
2007	CSI: Miami	Peter Ashford	Episode: "Rush"
2007–2008	Legion of Super Heroes	Imperiex (voice)	7 episodes
2008	Back at the Barnyard	Bessy's Kid (voice)	Episode: "Otis' Mom"
2008	Wolverine and the X-Men	Randy (voice)	Episode: "Hindsight"
2008–2009	Terminator: The Sarah Connor Chronicles	Miles Dyson	3 episodes
2008–2010	The Secret Saturdays	Doc Saturday, additional voices	25 episodes
2009	Batman: The Brave and the Bold	Jonah Hex, Fox (voice)	2 episodes
2010	Warren the Ape	Dr. Thom Milligan	Episode: "It Girl"
2010	Black Panther	W'Kabi, M'Butu, additional voices	5 episodes
2010–2014	Love That Girl!	Delroy Jones	15 episodes
2011	Hot in Cleveland	Lou	Episode: "One Thing or a Mother"
2011–2013	Shake It Up	Dr. Curtis Blue	5 episodes
2012–2013	SuperF*ckers	Ultra Richard, Plant Pal (voice)	Main role
2012–2013	Green Lantern: The Animated Series	Saint Walker (voice)	4 episodes
2012–2013	Ultimate Spider-Man	Max Fury / Scorpio, Zodiac Member (voice)	2 episodes
2013	Sofia the First	Plank (voice)	Episode: "The Floating Palace"
2014	The Boondocks	Additional voices	2 episodes
2014–2016	Baby Daddy	Marshall Dobbs	3 episodes
2015	Girl Meets World	Agent LaChance	Episode: "Girls Meets Semi-Formal"
2015–2016	Kirby Buckets	Bob Bruchow	2 episodes
2016	Lego Scooby-Doo! Knight Time Terror	Adam, Treasure Hunter #1 (voice)	Television special
2016	Black-ish	Frank Duckworth	Episode: "Johnson & Johnson"
2016	Pure Genius	Sergeant Ryan	Episode: "You Must Remember This"
2016	Fuller House	Dave	Episode: "Glazed and Confused"
2016	Be Cool, Scooby-Doo!	Ed Johnson, Captain Anderson, Dr. Dunsbury, Prison Guard, Security Guards (voice)	3 episodes
2017	Powerless	STAR Scientist	Episode: "No Consequence Day"
2017	NCIS: Los Angeles	Colton Leach	Episode: "Fool Me Twice"
2018	Young Sheldon	One (voice)	Episode: "Demons, Sunday School, and Prime Numbers"
2018	9JKL	Dr. Starnes	Episode: "Fridays with Harry"
2018	Work in Progress	Himself	6 episodes
2018	Craig of the Creek	Earl Williams (voice)	9 episodes
2018	Bravest Warriors	George (voice)	5 episodes
2018	Angie Tribeca	Samuel Hagar	Episode: "Heading to the Legal Beagle"
2019–23	Doom Patrol	Silas Stone	19 episodes
2021	Pete the Cat	Dak Billingsly	Episode: "Pete Over-Extended"
2022	The Neighborhood	Terrence	Episode: "Welcome to the Feud"
2022	Young Justice	General Zod, Lor-Zod, Noble Davis (voice)	
2025	Love, Death and Robots	General Dodds (voice)	Episode: "Golgotha"

=== Video games ===
Year	Title	Role	Notes
2001	Atlantis The Lost Empire: Trial by Fire	Dr. Joshua Strongbear Sweet	
2001	Command & Conquer: Yuri's Revenge	Additional voices	
2003	Command & Conquer: Generals	Additional voices	
2003	Freelancer	Additional voices	
2003	Tomb Raider: The Angel of Darkness	Additional voices	
2004	Law & Order: Justice Is Served	Tony Jefferson, Omar Talib	
2005	Ratchet: Deadlocked	Merc, Reactor, Captain Starshield	
2005	True Crime: New York City	President Lincoln	
2006	Reservoir Dogs	Additional voices	
2006	Saints Row	Radio voice	
2006	Destroy All Humans! 2	Gastro, Bay City Hippie, Bay City African-American Hippie	
2006	The Sopranos: Road to Respect	Additional voices	
2007	Command & Conquer 3: Tiberium Wars	Additional voices	
2007	Spider-Man 3	Additional voices	
2008	Destroy All Humans! Big Willy Unleashed	Blasto	
2008	Kung Fu Panda	Great Gorilla	
2008	Saints Row 2	Legal Lee, additional voices	
2008	Destroy All Humans! Path of the Furon	Rollo, Sunnywood Bouncer	
2009	Cartoon Network Universe: FusionFall	Doc Saturday	
2009	Red Faction: Guerrilla	Additional voices	
2009	Undead Knights	Knight Captain Gerard	
2009	The Secret Saturdays: Beasts of the 5th Sun	Doc Saturday	
2010	Command & Conquer 4: Tiberian Twilight	Additional voices	
2011	Saints Row: The Third	Pedestrians	
2013	Saints Row IV	Mr. Sunshine	
2013	Lightning Returns: Final Fantasy XIII	Additional voices	
2018	Spider-Man	Dr. Morgan Michaels	
2019	Days Gone	Derrick Kouri	
2020	Star Wars: Squadrons	Lindon Javes	
TBA	Deadlock	Infernus	

=== Music videos ===
Year	Artist	Title	Notes
2025	Ice Nine Kills	"The Laugh Track"	Reprised Seinfeld role portraying Jackie Chiles
