= Heidi Swedberg =

American actress, musician (born 1966/67)

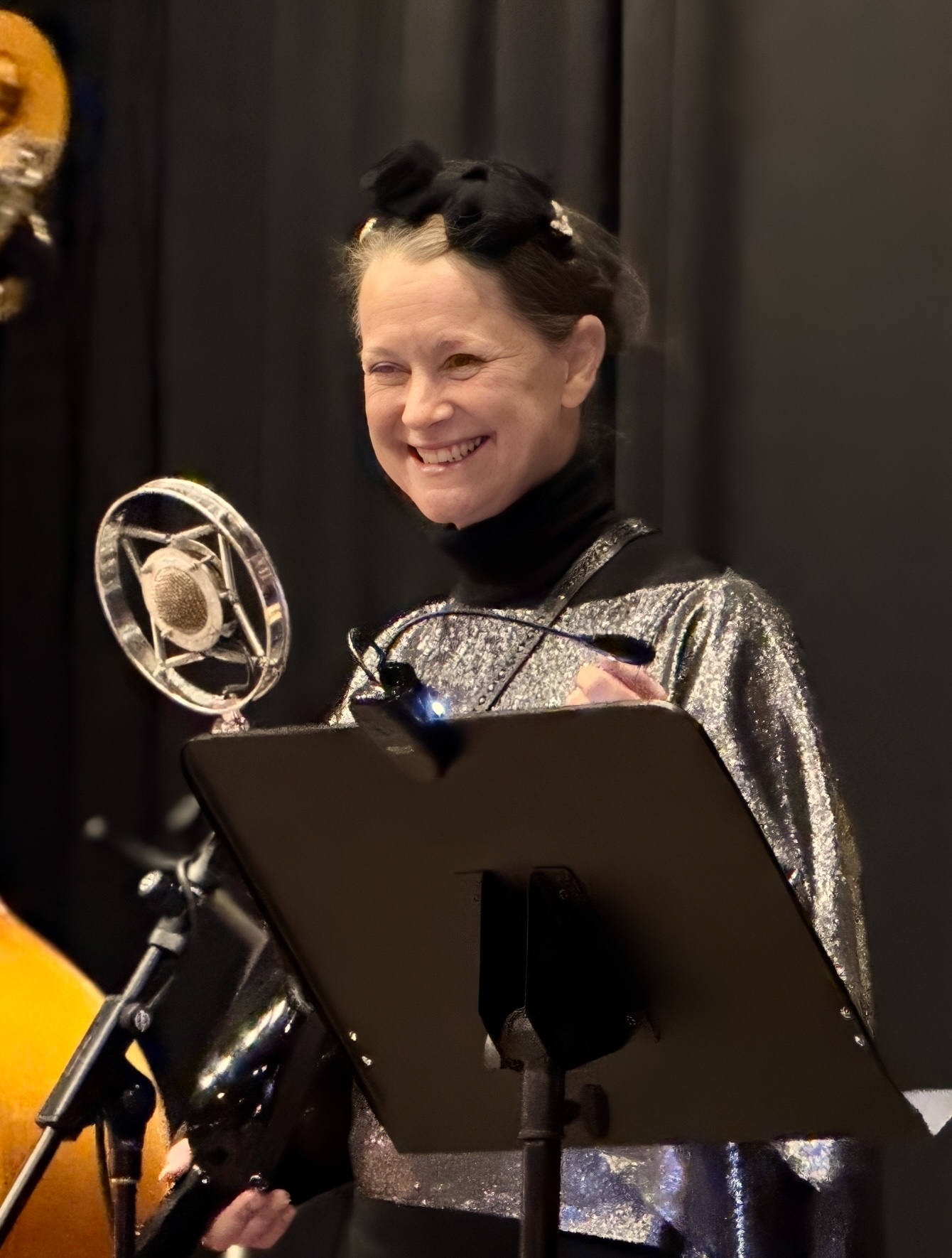
- Swedberg in 2024
- Born: 1966 or 1967 (age 59–60); Honolulu, Hawaii, U.S.
- Occupation: Actress
- Years active: 1989–2010
- Spouse: Philip Holahan (m. 1994; div. 2019)
- Children: 2
- Website: www.sukeyjumpmusic.com

Heidi Swedberg (born 1966 or 1967) is an American former actress, best known for playing Susan Ross, the fiancée of George Costanza, on the television sitcom Seinfeld. She has not performed as an actress since 2010, and has worked as a musician and educator.

== Early life ==
Swedberg was born in Honolulu, Hawaii, and grew up in Albuquerque, New Mexico, graduating from Sandia High School in 1984.

== Career ==
=== Acting ===
After graduation, Swedberg moved to Kentucky, where she spent a year at the Actors Theatre of Louisville. Her first film role was in Norman Jewison's In Country (1989). She then appeared in Welcome Home, Roxy Carmichael and Kindergarten Cop (both 1990) and in Too Much Sun and the Jim Abrahams comedy spoof Hot Shots! (both 1991). She then took on the role of Susan Ross in the long-running TV comedy Seinfeld (11 episodes in season four, 16 episodes in season seven, and in a flashback in season nine's 'backward' episode). She acted in many other television shows both before and after her appearances on Seinfeld.

=== Music ===
Swedberg's last acting credit was in 2010, after which she shifted her career toward music and education. She taught music at Saint Brendan Elementary School in the Los Angeles Hancock Park neighborhood. While living in Hawaii, Swedberg grew up playing the ukulele. In 1992, when playing a singer/songwriter for a television pilot, she began playing the instrument again. She plays it and sings in her band, Heidi Swedberg and The Sukey Jump Band, with whom she has released the albums PLAY! (2009) and My Cup of Tea (2013).

Swedberg appears at ukulele festivals and nightclubs with her other band, the Smoking Jackets, with multi-instrumentalists Daniel Ward, Craig McClelland and John Bartlit. She regularly teaches music at the John C. Campbell Folk School.

== Personal life ==
Swedberg was married to Philip Holahan from 1994 until their divorce in 2019. Together they have two daughters.

== Filmography ==
=== Film ===
Year	Title	Role	Notes
1989	In Country	Dawn	
1990	Too Much Sun	Sister Agnes	
1990	Welcome Home, Roxy Carmichael	Andrea Stein	
1990	Kindergarten Cop	Joshua’s Mother	
1991	Hot Shots!	Mary Thompson	
1996	Up Close & Personal	Sheila	
1997	A Parking Lot Story	Car Owner	Short film
1998	Dennis the Menace Strikes Again	Alice Mitchell	Video
1999	Galaxy Quest	Brandon's mother	
2000	75 Degrees in July	Kay Colburn	

=== Television ===
Year	Title	Role	Notes
1989	Matlock	Sister Katherine	"The Priest"
1990	Thirtysomething	Miss Jackie	"The Guilty Party"
1991	Quantum Leap	Valerie Nevski	"Private Dancer"
1991	Northern Exposure	Linda	"Only You"
1991-92	Brooklyn Bridge	Miss McCullough	"When Irish Eyes Are Smiling", "The Gift"
1992	Sisters	Jill Parkins	"Troubled Waters", "Working Girls"
1992	Roc	Helen	"Roc Throws Joey Out", "Joey Messes Up"
1992–1997	Seinfeld	Susan Ross	Recurring role in 29 episodes
1993	Roc	Helen	"You Don't Send Me No Flowers"
1994	Empty Nest	Patty Olsen	"Love a la Mode"
1994	Murder, She Wrote	Lorna Thompson	"Proof in the Pudding"
1994	Star Trek: Deep Space Nine	Rekelen	"Profit and Loss"
1994	Father and Scout	Donna Paley	TV film
1994	Grace Under Fire	Ramona	"Jimmy's Girl", "Cold Turkey"
1995	If Not for You	Melanie McKee	"Pilot"
1996	Touched by an Angel	Marty Dillard	"Secret Service"
1997	The Ticket	Rita	TV film
1997	Breast Men	Eileen	TV film
1999	Evolution's Child	Elaine Cordell	TV film
2001	Roswell	Meredith Dupree	"Disturbing Behavior", "How the Other Half Lives"
2001	Gideon's Crossing	Mrs. Cabochon	"Flashpoint"
2001	Strong Medicine	Celia Farber	"Rebirth"
2002	ER	Robin Turner	"Lockdown", "Chaos Theory"
2002	Gilmore Girls	Debbie Fincher	"One's Got Class and the Other Ones Dyes"
2003	Oliver Beene	Cynthia Vogel	"A Day at the Beach"
2003	Becker	Mrs. Whitford	"Mr. and Ms. Conception"
2006	Without a Trace	Laura Worth	"911"
2008	Bones	Alice Elliot	"The Finger in the Nest"
2009	Wizards of Waverly Place	Miss Majorhealey	"Art Teacher"
2010	Hawthorne	Olivia Maxwell	"Hidden Truths"
