= Harvey Miller (screenwriter) =

American actor, director, producer and screenwriter

- Born: Harvey Skolnik; June 15, 1935; New York, U.S.
- Died: January 8, 1999 (aged 63); Los Angeles, California, U.S.
- Occupations: Actor; director; producer; screenwriter
- Years active: 1957–1999

Harvey Skolnik (June 15, 1935 – January 8, 1999) was an American actor, director, producer and screenwriter. He was nominated for an Academy Award in the category Best Original Screenplay for the film Private Benjamin.

In addition to his Academy Award nomination, he was nominated for two Primetime Emmy Awards in the category Outstanding Comedy Series for his work on The Odd Couple and Love, American Style.

Miller died on January 8, 1999, of heart failure at his home in Los Angeles, California, at the age of 63.

== Filmography ==
- Studio One (1957) (TV)
- The Mothers-In-Law (1967–1968) (TV)
- Accidental Family (1967–1968) (TV)
- That Girl (1968) (TV)
- Gomer Pyle U.S.M.C. (1969)
- The Ghost & Mrs. Muir (1968) (TV)
- Love American Style (1969–1974)
- Barefoot in the Park (1970) (TV)
- The Odd Couple (1970–1975)
- Anna and the King (1972) (TV)
- The Bob Newhart Show (1972–1978) (TV)
- Sirota's Court (1976–1977) (TV)
- Laverne and Shirley (Supervising Producer) (1978) (TV)
- Private Benjamin (1980) (with Nancy Meyers and Charles Shyer)
- Student Bodies (1981) (Executive Producer)
- Jekyll and Hyde...Together Again (with Monica Johnson Jerry Belson and Michael Leeson) (1982)
- The Cannonball Run II (with Hal Needham and Albert S. Ruddy) (1984)
- Protocol (story only, with Nancy Meyers, Charles Shyer and Buck Henry) (1984)
- Bad Medicine (1985) (based on a novel by Steven Horowitz and Neil Offen) (also Director) (1985)
- Getting Away with Murder (also Director) (1996)
