= 2030 (disambiguation) =

2030 (MMXXX) will be a common year starting on Tuesday in the Gregorian calendar.

2030 may also refer to:

- 2030 (number)
- 2030 (film), a 2014 Vietnamese film written and directed by Nguyễn Võ Nghiêm Minh
- 2030 (novel), a 2011 novel written by Albert Brooks
