= Damita Jo =

Damita Jo may refer to:

- Damita Jo (album), a 2004 album by Janet Jackson and her middle name, and the title song
- Damita Jo DeBlanc (1930–1998), aka Damita Jo, American singer and comedian.
- Damita Jo Freeman, American dancer and actress, who started her career on the TV show Soul Train
