= Billye Wallace =

American actress (1925–1999)

- Wallace in Seinfeld, 1994
- Born: Billye Ree Jones; July 17, 1925; Decatur, Texas, U.S.
- Died: March 3, 1999 (aged 73); Los Angeles, California, U.S.
- Resting place: Carlsbad Cemetery, New Mexico
- Occupations: Film, stage and television actress
- Known for: Nana on Seinfeld
- Spouse: Matthew Wallace
- Children: 2

Billye Wallace (born Billye Ree Jones; July 17, 1925 – March 3, 1999) was an American character actress who worked in theater, film and television. Trained by acting teacher Stella Adler, she appeared in approximately 50 plays and became known for supporting roles as elderly women in television comedies. She portrayed Nana, the grandmother of Jerry Seinfeld, in three episodes of Seinfeld, and Helen "Silvie" Rubadoux in the medical drama ER. Her film appearances included Mother (1996).

== Early life and education ==
Wallace was born Billye Ree Jones on July 17, 1925, in Decatur, Texas, to D. I. Jones and Rowena Miller Jones. She received her early education in Fort Worth, Texas, before moving to Carlsbad, New Mexico, in 1940. She graduated from Carlsbad High School as valedictorian in 1941 and subsequently attended Western New Mexico in Silver City, New Mexico.

In 1948, Wallace moved to Orange, California, where she began working as a bookkeeper for an insurance company. She remained employed by the firm until becoming ill in 1998 and also owned a certified public accounting business in California, according to her obituary.

== Career ==
Wallace studied acting with Stella Adler and performed in approximately 50 stage productions. Although her early acting work focused on theater, she later became a character actress in film and television, particularly in roles portraying older women.

Her screen work included the film Night Visitors (1989) and appearances on television series such as Who's the Boss?, Beverly Hills, 90210, Ellen, Murphy Brown, Coach, Hope & Gloria and Mad About You.

In 1994 and 1995, Wallace played Nana, Jerry Seinfeld's grandmother, in three sixth-season episodes of Seinfeld: "The Pledge Drive", "The Kiss Hello" and "The Doodle". She also appeared as Helen "Silvie" Rubadoux, the seriously ill wife of a character played by Red Buttons, in three episodes of ER broadcast between December 1995 and January 1996. A January 1996 television preview in The Ledger described the storyline as involving postoperative complications and the character of Dr. John Carter, played by Noah Wyle.

Wallace appeared as Alice in the Albert Brooks comedy film Mother (1996), starring Brooks and Debbie Reynolds. The Los Angeles Times described her role as an eccentric elderly woman in a grocery store. She also appeared in television commercials, including an advertisement for Del Monte salsa, and in David Lee Roth's music video for "Just a Gigolo/I Ain't Got Nobody".

In October 1992, Wallace attended the 50th reunion of Carlsbad High School's class of 1942, where she entertained attendees with a monologue. The newspaper identified her at that time as a resident of West Hollywood, California.

== Personal life and death ==
Wallace's husband, Matthew Wallace, died before her. She had two sons, Mark L. Fessenden and Eric Rainwater. Her survivors also included her mother, Rowena Orton, her sister, Oma Ruth O'Rear, seven grandchildren and four great-grandchildren.

Wallace died of emphysema on March 3, 1999, aged 73, at Cedars-Sinai Medical Center in Los Angeles. She was buried at Carlsbad Cemetery in New Mexico.

== Filmography ==
=== Film ===
Year	Title	Role	Notes
1989	Night Visitors	Ardis Whitmore	Video production
1994	Shrunken Heads	Mrs. Wilson	
1995	Pie in the Sky	Funeral Guest	
1996	Mother	Alice	
1997	Glam	Bobo	Credited as Billye Ree Williams

=== Television ===
Year(s)	Title	Role	Notes
1990	Who's the Boss?	Woman	Episode: "Four Alarm Tony"
1991	True Colors	Finkie	1 episode
1994	Beverly Hills, 90210	Librarian #2	Episode: "Addicted to Love"
1994	Ellen	Polly	Episode: "Adam's Birthday"
1994	On Our Own	Esther Bunny	1 episode
1994–1995	Seinfeld	Nana	3 episodes
1995	Love & War	Yenta #2	1 episode
1995	Murphy Brown	Mrs. Louise Saunders	1 episode
1995	Coach	Fluffy Potballs	1 episode
1995	Hope & Gloria	Old Gloria	1 episode
1995	Dream On	Coat Check Woman	Episode: "Music in My Veins (1)"
1995–1996	ER	Helen "Silvie" Rubadoux	3 episodes
1996	Mad About You	The Sweet Little Woman	Episode: "Ovulation Day"
1996	Tracey Takes On...	Rose the Journalist	1 episode
