= The Muse (1999 film) =

1999 comedy film by Albert Brooks

- Theatrical release poster
- Directed by: Albert Brooks
- Written by: Albert Brooks; Monica Johnson
- Produced by: Herb Nanas
- Starring: Albert Brooks; Sharon Stone; Andie MacDowell; Jeff Bridges
- Cinematography: Thomas E. Ackerman
- Edited by: Peter Teschner
- Music by: Elton John
- Distributed by: October Films (through USA Films)
- Release date: August 27, 1999
- Running time: 97 minutes
- Country: United States
- Language: English
- Budget: $15 million
- Box office: $11.6 million

The Muse is a 1999 American comedy film starring Albert Brooks, Sharon Stone, Andie MacDowell and Jeff Bridges. It is the sixth film to be directed by Brooks, from a screenplay co-written with Monica Johnson. Stone portrays the titular muse who is tasked with reviving the career of a once-celebrated Hollywood screenwriter, played by Brooks. The film also features numerous cameos from well-known filmmakers, including Martin Scorsese and James Cameron.

The film received mixed reviews and did not meet with large box office success, grossing only about $11 million domestically. Sharon Stone earned a nomination for a Golden Globe Award for Best Actress in a Motion Picture - Musical or Comedy.

== Plot ==
After winning a lifetime achievement award, esteemed screenwriter Steven Phillips has a rude awakening. Believing the award has no real meaning, he finds out it means his career is over. His studio has reneged on renewing his contract, telling him he's "lost his edge." Junior exec Josh Martin tells him over lunch that his new script is dull and he is to be off the lot by five.

Desperate to revive his career, he seeks advice from very successful screenwriter Jack, who arranges an introduction to Sarah, a modern-day muse who can inspire anyone. She has lavish demands (expensive hotel rooms, gifts from Tiffany's), much to his wife Laura's chagrin.

Steven isn't sure if she is authentic or a charlatan. She takes him to Long Beach, where they bump into writer-director Rob Reiner, whom Sarah clearly knows. There, Steven gets an idea for a movie set in an aquarium, with Jim Carrey as the lead.

As Sarah's demands increase, Steven's apprehensive wife begins to be won over. Through the muse's encouragement Laura decides to pursue her dream of baking and selling cookies, to great success.

To save money, Sarah is invited to move into their house. Steven, however, is frustrated because she spends more time helping others — Hollywood writers and directors like James Cameron and Martin Scorsese, who come to Steven's house to see her. He even surrenders his own bedroom to her, sleeping in the guest house.

When he pleads for a good ending for his aquarium screenplay, Sarah points Steven in the right direction, inspiring him with a great idea. Steven's agent Hal is thrilled and urges him to finish the script as quickly as possible, which he does.

The following morning, though, two visitors come to Steven's, doctors from a mental clinic. They tell him Sarah is an escaped psychiatric patient from their asylum with multiple personality disorder. They find the whole "muse" idea hilarious. When they try to find Sarah to take her back, they discover that she has escaped and decide not to look for her, as she can come and go anytime she wants.

The junior exec, Josh, loves Steven's script but breaks the news it is already in production at another studio — by Rob Reiner. A broken-hearted Steven goes to work in his wife's new cookie business.

Things look up when the agent calls to tell Steven that the Reiner project fell through and the studio wants to purchase his version, contingent upon a few changes. An excited Steven goes to the studio, where a secretary reveals that Josh was fired for stealing and they have a new boss in charge, Christine. Steven is shocked to see Christine is Sarah in a black wig. She takes Steven's arm and insists that they discuss the changes over a nice, expensive lunch, which she expects him to pay for. Steven frantically tries to comprehend what is happening.

== Cast ==
- Albert Brooks as Steven Phillips
- Sharon Stone as Sarah Little
- Andie MacDowell as Laura Phillips
- Jeff Bridges as Jack Warrick
- Mark Feuerstein as Josh Martin
- Bradley Whitford as Hal
- Steven Wright as Stan Spielberg

Cameos

- Jennifer Tilly
- Rob Reiner
- Wolfgang Puck
- James Cameron
- Martin Scorsese
- Lorenzo Lamas

== Soundtrack ==
Elton John composed the soundtrack for The Muse.

== Reception ==
The Muse was a box office disappointment, grossing about $11 million domestically on an estimated budget of $15 million. It did relatively poorly at the box office compared to some of Brooks' other films, such as Defending Your Life (1991), which made $16 million, and Mother (1996), which made $19 million.

Critical reception was lukewarm, with the film holding a 53% rating at Rotten Tomatoes based on 78 reviews, with the consensus: "Despite quirky and original writing, the subject matter feels too removed to produce laughs". Metacritic, which uses a weighted average, assigned the film a score of 57 out of 100, based on 29 critics, indicating "mixed or average" reviews.

Wade Major, writing in Boxoffice, called it "a first-rate Hollywood satire that fearlessly goes so far as to even name names. Agents, executives, directors, actors and even writers are given their lumps—many showing up to do the on-screen damage themselves in a cascade of self-deprecating cameos. Stone's dizzy Muse, however, is the film's most delightful surprise, providing an energetic counterpoint to Brooks' neurotic fatalism..."

Variety critic Todd McCarthy thought it "Typically fresh and idiosyncratic in the writing but often flat directorially." McCarthy also believed that its commercial potential was restricted to "sophisticated upscale audiences." Janet Maslin of the New York Times, however, thought it was "one of Mr. Brooks's most broadly entertaining films," with "enough of a stellar twinkle to bring it to a more general audience."

In a three-star review, Roger Ebert thought "the movie is good, but not great Brooks; not the equal of Lost in America or Mother, but smart, funny—and edgy." Los Angeles Times critic Kenneth Turan wrote: "Underneath all its humor, The Muse manages to casually deal with some fascinating issues, such as the nature of creativity and inspiration and the important role belief has in making things happen. After all, as someone says, 'This is Hollywood. People here believe anything.'"

== Golden Globe controversy ==
In 1999, Helmut Voss, then president of the Hollywood Foreign Press Association, who give the annual Golden Globe Awards, ordered all 82 of its members to return gift luxury watches sent by either Sharon Stone or USA/October Films (now merged into Focus Features). The luxury watches were considered promotions for a nomination for Stone's performance in the film. According to Variety, Voss ordered the return of the gifts "to protect the integrity of its award". Stone received the nomination for Best Actress in a Motion Picture Musical or Comedy, but lost to Janet McTeer for Tumbleweeds.
