= Bad Medicine (film) =

1985 film

- Theatrical release poster
- Directed by: Harvey Miller
- Screenplay by: Harvey Miller
- Based on: the 1977 novel Calling Dr. Horowitz by Steven Horowitz, MD and Neil Offen
- Produced by: Arlene Sellers; Alex Winitsky
- Starring: Steve Guttenberg; Alan Arkin; Julie Hagerty
- Cinematography: Kelvin Pike
- Edited by: O. Nicholas Brown; John Jympson; Keith Palmer
- Music by: Lalo Schifrin
- Distributed by: 20th Century Fox
- Release date: November 22, 1985
- Running time: 98 minutes
- Country: United States
- Language: English
- Budget: $8 million
- Box office: $2,685,453 (USA) (sub-total)

Bad Medicine is a 1985 American comedy film starring Steve Guttenberg, Alan Arkin and Julie Hagerty. The film was written and directed by Harvey Miller, and was based on the 1977 novel Calling Dr. Horowitz, by Steven Horowitz, MD and Neil Offen.

The film was criticized for its negative ethnic stereotypes. Although the film is set "Somewhere in Central America," it was filmed entirely in Spain. It was released by 20th Century Fox, and was one of three 1985 films to feature Hagerty in a starring role, the others being Lost in America and Goodbye, New York.

== Plot ==
Below-average pre-medical student Jeffrey Marx (Guttenberg), after being rejected by prestigious medical schools, is sent by his father (Bill Macy) to a seemingly sub-standard medical school in Central America. He and his fellow American students struggle with exams, the effects of pep pills, and the language barrier. Jeffrey eventually discovers the plight of local villagers in need of medical assistance. With the help of fellow students (including romantic interest Hagerty, who steals medicine and prescription pads), he illegally provides medical services to the villagers, including delivering a baby whose enraged father had earlier shot him in anger. A comic scene shows three students trying to hide a stolen cadaver. Eventually, the school's authoritarian, macho dean (Arkin) discovers the students' activities and decides to prosecute, while also trying to romance a reluctant Hagerty. However, the dean dismisses the charges at the urging of the villagers.

== Reception ==
The New York Times gave it a mixed review and was critical of the ending, which the reviewer felt undermined what had gone before. Most other reviewers in New York gave it unfavorable reviews. Audiences polled by CinemaScore gave the film an average grade of "D+" on an A+ to F scale.
