= Kathryn Harrold =

American actress (born 1950)

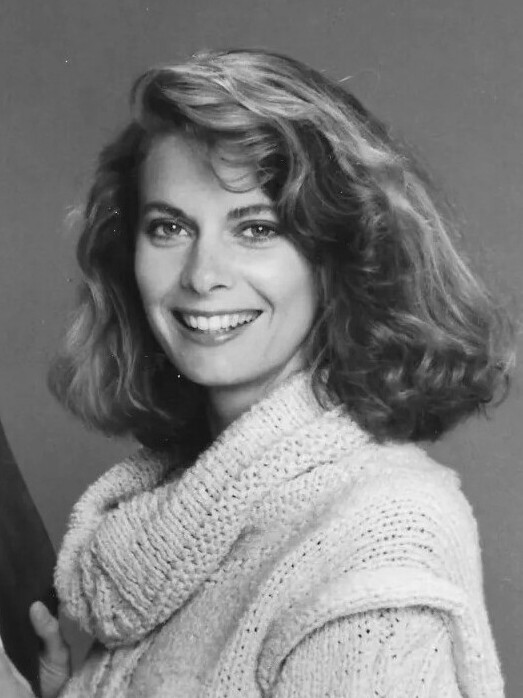
- Harrold in 1985
- Born: August 2, 1950 (age 76); Tazewell, Virginia, U.S.
- Occupation: Actress
- Years active: 1975–2011
- Spouse: Lawrence O'Donnell (m. 1994; div. 2013)
- Children: 1

Kathryn Harrold (born August 2, 1950) is an American former actress, best known for her leading roles in films The Hunter (1980), Modern Romance (1981), The Pursuit of D. B. Cooper (1981), Yes, Giorgio (1982), and Raw Deal (1986). She had leading roles in the horror films Nightwing (1979) and The Sender (1982). She also played Francine Sanders in HBO's The Larry Sanders Show.

== Early life ==
Harrold was born in Tazewell, Virginia, to B.H. and Carolyn Harrold. She attended Tazewell High School and Mills College in Oakland, California, majoring in drama. She studied acting at HB Studio in New York City.

== Career ==
=== Television ===
Harrold began her television career playing Nola Dancy Aldrich on the NBC daytime soap opera The Doctors from 1976 to 1977. After she left the show, her replacement was Kathleen Turner. In 1978-79 she appeared in two episodes of The Rockford Files, as a blind psychologist with whom Rockford was in love. In the 1980s, she had the leading roles in the short-lived dramas MacGruder and Loud (1985), produced by Aaron Spelling, and The Bronx Zoo (1987–88), opposite Ed Asner. From 1991 to 1993, she co-starred alongside Regina Taylor and Sam Waterston in the NBC period drama I'll Fly Away. She later was a regular cast member on The Larry Sanders Show, playing Francine Sanders.

During her career, she appeared in several made-for-television movies, most notably Women in White (1979); Vampire (1979); and Bogie (1980), in which she played movie legend Lauren Bacall, reportedly against Bacall's wishes, and the HBO film Dead Solid Perfect (1988) in a leading role opposite Randy Quaid. She also starred in Man Against the Mob (1988) with George Peppard, aired on NBC as a TV movie. In the late 1990s, she had a recurring role in the CBS medical drama Chicago Hope and the following years guest-starred on The Practice, Judging Amy, CSI: NY, and Desperate Housewives.

=== Film ===
Harrold was Steve McQueen's leading lady in the screen legend's final film, The Hunter (1980), and Arnold Schwarzenegger's leading lady in the action vehicle Raw Deal (1986). She appeared in Nightwing (1979), The Pursuit of D. B. Cooper (1981), the cult horror film The Sender (1982), and co-starred with Luciano Pavarotti in Yes, Giorgio (1982). Harrold starred in Modern Romance (1981) as the ex-girlfriend of Albert Brooks's character. Harrold also had a supporting role in Into the Night (1985), an action/suspense film directed by John Landis, as Paul Mazursky's character's girlfriend.

== Personal life ==
Harrold married Lawrence O'Donnell on February 14, 1994. The couple had one child, Elizabeth, and eventually divorced in 2013. Harrold retrained as a Licensed Marriage and Family Therapist (LMFT) and runs her own counseling practice in Los Angeles, California.

== Filmography ==
=== Film ===
Year	Title	Role
1979	Nightwing	Anne Dillon
1980	The Hunter	Dotty Thorson
1981	Modern Romance	Mary Harvard
1981	The Pursuit of D. B. Cooper	Hannah Meade
1982	Yes, Giorgio	Pamela Taylor
1982	The Sender	Gail Farmer
1984	Heartbreakers	Cyd
1985	Into the Night	Christie
1986	Raw Deal	Monique
1987	Someone to Love	Kathryn

=== Television ===
Year	Title	Role	Notes
1976–1977	The Doctors	Nola Dancy Aldrich	Regular role
1978	Starsky & Hutch	Laura Kanen	Episode: "Deckwatch"
1978–1979	The Rockford Files	Megan Dougherty	2 episodes
1979	Women in White	Dr. Jill Bates	TV film
1979	Son-Rise: A Miracle of Love	Suzie Kaufman	TV film
1979	Vampire	Leslie Rawlins	TV film
1980	Bogie	Lauren Bacall	TV film
1980	The Women's Room	Bliss	TV film
1983	An Uncommon Love	Cynthia Malcolm	TV film
1984	The Best Legs in the Eighth Grade	Leslie Applegate	TV film
1985	MacGruder and Loud	Jenny Loud	Main role
1987–1988	The Bronx Zoo	Sara Newhouse	Main role
1988	Man Against the Mob	Marilyn Butler	TV film
1988	Dead Solid Perfect	Beverly T. Lee	TV film
1990	Capital News	Mary Ward	Pilot
1990	Rainbow Drive	Christine	TV film
1991	Deadly Desire	Angela	TV film
1991	Dream On	Veronica Sheridan	Episode: "To Have and Have and Have and Have Not"
1991–1993	I'll Fly Away	Christina LeKatzis	Main role
1993	The Larry Sanders Show	Francine Sanders	Regular role (season 2)
1994	The Companion	Gillian Tanner	TV film
1996	The Rockford Files: Punishment and Crime	Megan Dougherty Adams	TV film
1996–1998	Chicago Hope	Dr. Karen Wilder	Recurring role (seasons 3–4)
1998	Outrage	Deena Bateman	TV film
1998	The Practice	Assistant District Attorney Wharton	Episode: "The Battlefield"
1999	Judging Amy	Chris Osborne	2 episodes
2000	The '70s	Connie Wells	TV film
2001	Jack & Jill	Hannah Jillefsky	3 episodes
2001	A Woman's a Helluva Thing	Brandy Landau	TV film
2001	Family Law	Grace Larson	Episode: "All in the Family"
2002	King of the Hill	Mother Superior / Mrs. Bonter (voice)	Episode: "You There God, It's Me Margaret Hill"
2003	Mister Sterling	Senator From Nevada	Episode: "Technical Corrections"
2003	Miracles	Morgan Bright	Episode: "Mother's Daughter"
2004	Medical Investigation	Carla Ballard	Episode: "The Unclean"
2004–2006	Desperate Housewives	Helen Rowland	3 episodes
2005	CSI: NY	Beverly Fulton	Episode: "The Closer"
2006	Mystery Woman: At First Sight	Hanna Branson McPhillips	TV film
2007–2011	Greek	Mrs. Chambers	4 episodes
