= Real Life (1979 film) =

1979 film

- Theatrical release poster
- Directed by: Albert Brooks
- Written by: Albert Brooks; Monica Johnson; Harry Shearer
- Produced by: Penelope Spheeris
- Starring: Charles Grodin; Frances Lee McCain; J. A. Preston; Matthew Tobin; Albert Brooks
- Cinematography: Eric Saarinen
- Edited by: David Finfer
- Music by: Mort Lindsey
- Distributed by: Paramount Pictures
- Release date: March 2, 1979 (New York)
- Running time: 99 minutes
- Language: English
- Box office: $364,642

Real Life is a 1979 American mockumentary comedy film starring Albert Brooks (in his directorial debut), who also co-authored the screenplay alongside Monica Johnson and Harry Shearer. It is a spoof of the 1973 reality television program An American Family and portrays a documentary filmmaker named Albert Brooks who attempts to live with and film a dysfunctional family for one full year.

Charles Grodin co-stars as the family's patriarch who allows cameras in his Arizona home. Real-life producer Jennings Lang also has an acting role in Real Life.

== Plot ==
Documentary film producer Albert Brooks leads a project meant to encapsulate the joys, sorrows and intimacy of real life by filming a regular American family, the Yeagers, for a full year using expensive cameras: some installed on walls, and four large helmet-like ones worn by a camera crew that follows Brooks and the family in and out of their neighboring homes.

The Yeagers are sent on vacation and filming starts as they arrive back at the airport, causing immediate nervousness in the family. Doctors Howard Hill and Ted Cleary are there to observe the project's integrity and progress. Cleary does not appreciate Brooks' intrusive method of constantly filming the family, worrying that their hold on reality is being threatened.

The mother, Jeanette, leaves the house without cameras to unwind and meets Brooks later to thank him by inviting him to an appointment at the gynecologist. Brooks is thrilled until Jeanette kisses him, which he dislikes. He warns her that he is no better than her husband and that his charisma "doesn't run deep".

The gynecologist refuses to be on camera because of a damning news story that ran about him years ago. Brooks offers him $500 to accept but then recognizes the man as "the baby broker" from the news story, causing the gynecologist to refuse the deal.

Warren brings the crew to witness a day at his work as a veterinarian. Being nervous from the cameras, he starts surgery on a horse by accidentally ordering an anesthetic drug twice, which kills the animal. He asks Brooks to not show the footage in the film, but Brooks will not agree to that.

Jeannette's grandmother dies and the family enters a deep depression. Trying to cheer the family up, Brooks invites Jeanette to a dinner date which she declines, having reconsidered her attraction to him. Brooks then shows up to the house in a clown costume to cheer the kids, but they are at school. While still in costume, Brooks is asked to sit down with Warren and Jeannette, where Warren confesses to fearing he may be on the verge of a nervous breakdown. Brooks dismisses the claim, saying that it is okay to be sad and confused as long as one does not "clam up".

After a meeting with the doctors, some scientists from the institute, and a film producer obsessed with getting movie stars involved, Dr. Cleary leaves the project, disapproving of how the family is being treated. The family returns to a happier, more harmonious lifestyle until Cleary's book on the project is published, calling it "mind-control" and "psychological rape". The book attracts attention to the family from newscasters, much to the anger of Brooks and the discomfort of the Yeagers.

Dr. Hill, the institute and the film producer call for the early termination of the project. Brooks brings the Yeagers to the meeting and, to his surprise, they also want to end the project. Despite his pleas and threats for them to stay, they do not change their minds and the producer calls for the Yeagers to be paid in full to apologize for the stress they endured.

While dressing back into the clown costume for a benefit at a children's hospital, in a desperate attempt to find a solid ending to the film, Brooks recalls the endings of famous films and decides to copy Gone with the Wind. He elatedly burns down the Yeagers' house, though no one is harmed.

An epilogue is presented in text form saying that the house was rebuilt with a tennis court added for 'appreciation', and that Dr. Cleary's book sold poorly and he is now ill. Real-life historians are invited to call 1-800-555-3824, should they want documentation on the project.

== Cast ==
- Albert Brooks as Albert Brooks
- Charles Grodin as Warren Yeager
- Frances Lee McCain as Jeannette Yeager
- J. A. Preston as Dr. Ted Cleary
- Matthew Tobin as Dr. Howard Hill
- Jennings Lang as Martin Brand
- David Spielberg as Dr. Jeremy Nolan
- Norman Bartold as Dr. Isaac Steven Hayward
- Julie Payne as Dr. Anne Kramer
- Johnny Haymer as Dr. Maxwell Rennert
- Leo McElroy as Jim Sanders
- Lisa Urette as Lisa Yeager
- Robert Stirrat as Eric Yeager
- Harry Shearer as Pete (camera operator)/radio voice
- James L. Brooks as Driving Evaluator

== Reception ==
Janet Maslin of The New York Times praised the film as an "often very funny assault on manners, moviemaking, an allegedly typical American family and everything its members hold dear ... Its manner is deadpan and sly, so sly that some viewers may not find it comic at all. But for anyone well-disposed toward Mr. Brooks, who is never without his absolute insincerity and irrational good cheer, Real Life is full of delightful nonsense, a very funny account of one man's crusade to capture all the truth and wisdom that money can buy."

Variety said: "Expanding on the deadpan satiric tone of the short parodies and pseudo-documentaries he's filmed in the past for NBC's Saturday Night Live into his first feature, Albert Brooks has come up with a mostly very funny (though uneven) take-off on social-minded docu filmmaking that stands to draw boxoffice support from the young adult, primarily college crowd that's made the late-night tv show the success it is."

Gene Siskel of the Chicago Tribune gave the film three-and-a-half stars out of four, and wrote: "Admittedly, documentary filmmaking doesn't sound like the greatest subject to be satirized, but Real Life is full of undeniable laughs."

Charles Champlin of the Los Angeles Times called Grodin "wonderful to watch" and thought that the film "generates some spectacular moments," but "the movie, like the experiment, runs out of steam well before it is finished and, like many a promising routine, is stuck for a sock ending."

Gary Arnold of The Washington Post stated: "Albert Brooks may be the Woody Allen of the 1980s. His extraordinary first feature, Real Life, demonstrates a potential genius for movie comedy and is animated by a peculiarly fertile and subtle imagination."

David Ansen of Newsweek wrote that the film "doesn't quite come off, for all its funny ideas. It feels like a 30-minute gag stretched to fill a feature film, and the repetitiousness of the situation gets wearisome. It's a one-note movie, and Brooks's performance doesn't help: he's like an aggressive emcee who doesn't know when to shut up and turn the show over to his guests. That may be the point, but it's also the problem."

Roger Ebert gave the film one star out of four and wrote that it "gets most of its laughs in the first 10 minutes, slides into a long middle stretch of repetitive situations and ends on a note of embarrassing hysteria. An idea is not enough for a movie. Characters have to be developed, comic situations have to be set up before they can pay off and the story should have a conclusion instead of a dead stop. Real Life fails in all of those areas — fails so miserably that it lets its audiences down."

Real Life holds a rating of 84% on Rotten Tomatoes based on 25 reviews, with an average score of 6.80/10.

== See also ==
- Mockumentary
- Reality television
