= Pledge drive =

Extended period of fundraising activities

A pledge drive is an extended period of fundraising activities, generally used by public broadcasting stations to increase contributions. The term "pledge" originates from the promise that a contributor makes to send in funding at regular intervals for a certain amount of time. During a pledge drive, regular and special programming is followed by on-air appeals for pledges by station employees, who ask the audience to make their contributions, usually by phone or the Internet, during this break.

Pledge drives are typically held two to four times annually, at calendar periods which vary depending on the scheduling designated by the local public broadcasting station.

== Background ==
Pledge drives are especially common among U.S. stations. Public broadcasting organizations like National Public Radio (NPR) and the Public Broadcasting Service (PBS) are largely dependent on program fees paid by their member stations. The federal government of the United States provides some money for them, primarily through the Corporation for Public Broadcasting (CPB), and corporate underwriting. American public broadcasting services hold pledge drives about two to three times each year, each one usually lasting one to two weeks. Some religious broadcasting organizations, including Educational Media Foundation (which operates the K-Love and Air1 radio networks), also rely heavily on such program fees. These stations require funding in turn from listeners and viewers (as well as, if necessary, local corporate sponsors) for not only these fees, but also other daily operating costs, and stage regular pledge drives in an attempt to persuade their audiences to contribute donations.

Originally, such programming consisted of arts presentations such as classical music, drama, and documentaries. However, the audience for supposedly "high-brow" fare began declining steadily during the 1980s and 1990s, due to the attrition of the generations to whom such programming mainly appealed. Younger people were less interested in the higher arts, for a variety of reasons having to do with the eclipse of "high culture" in American society. In order to appeal to such a largely Euro-American, middle-aged and affluent demographic (the so-called "Baby Boomers" and "Generation X"), PBS has resorted to specials such as self-help programs with speakers such as Suze Orman, nostalgic popular music concerts (including T. J. Lubinsky's My Music concert series, produced specifically for pledge drive airings), and special versions of PBS' traditionally popular "how-to" programs. This approach was largely pioneered by the Oklahoma Educational Television Authority (OETA), which introduced a number of popular music specials as part of its 1987 pledge drive. A retrospective on The Lawrence Welk Show was originally introduced as pledge drive material in 1987; its popularity prompted the OETA to acquire rerun rights to the series and distribute it through PBS.

A hallmark of pledge breaks is the "pledge room", where the speakers deliver their message as volunteering individuals answer ringing telephones in the background, though in some cases, it may actually be a fictionalized part of the program (noticeable if the pledge room is drastically different from program to program and is neutralized, featuring none of the member station's logos within the set dressing), with the volunteers actually paid actors feigning telephone calls and the hosts having been filmed months before. Small prizes such as mugs, tote bags, various DVD sets, and books (known as "thank-you" gifts or, euphemistically, as "premiums"), as well as entries into drawings for larger awards such as trips and vehicles donated by local businesses, are also offered by many stations in return for pledging certain amounts of money. The pledges can be done by either paying per month or a one-time contribution, e.g. $15 a month or $180.

== Controversy ==
Pledge drives have been controversial for most of their existence. While pledge drives are an effective method of raising money for stations, they usually annoy viewers and listeners, who find the regular interruption of what is ordinarily commercial-free content and the station's regular programming being suspended for lifestyle and music specials to be a nuisance. Audience numbers often decline during pledge drives; to compensate, most television stations air special television shows during these fundraising periods. This practice began in earnest in the mid-1970s due to CPB funding cutbacks that were the result of political pressures and the recessions of the time, as well as increasing inflation. As the proportions of government funding in stations' budgets continued to decline over time, such programs became more elaborate in order to sway people who would otherwise watch public television only sporadically (or not at all) to tune in, and possibly donate money in response to appeals during program breaks.

There has also been criticism of the format depending on controversial self-help writers or lecturers not usually a part of any regular PBS member station's schedule, or if the presented program is targeted to appeal only to a wealthy and/or older demographic (as seen with Doo Wop 50) while completely ignoring the viewing needs of other audiences. Stations also have had to reckon with balancing out or dispensing with pledge drives entirely during PBS Kids children's programming, as due to their very nature, the disruption of a routine, for a matter children are unable to understand or contribute to, could drive or push those young viewers towards commercial children's programming on other networks or Internet streaming.

Generally speaking, the phenomenon is less pronounced on American public radio stations, primarily because of the high popularity of the news and talk programs on that medium and the routine-based patterns of radio listeners that are much more easily disrupted than those of television, along with stricter underwriting guidelines and less tolerance for the television formats and hosts on radio. Much of the focus is placed upon the "drive time" NPR news programs Morning Edition and All Things Considered, which have the highest ratings of all public broadcasting in the U.S. This is in contrast to PBS member stations sometimes holding their drives during prime time daily and on weekend afternoons, and not during the daytime on weekdays or weekend mornings, when children's programming is typically scheduled.

However, in light of intense competition public broadcasting faces from a greatly expanded media environment, other stations, especially radio, have aimed to eliminate pledge drives altogether, or significantly reduce their length, by asking for contributions throughout the year during regular station identification breaks. On radio, such programs as ATC may have one of their planned stories deleted simply to extend the length of the fund-raising "pitches".

In a more recent trend, some stations also advertise that pledge drives will be shortened by one day for every day's worth of contributions donated in the weeks leading up to a drive. Additionally, some radio stations have started using prospect screening during their pledge drive to identify potential major donors for later fundraising activities. Another service which has cut down pledge drives is the introduction of PBS's Passport streaming service, which provides a tangible and continuing item (full streaming access to several years of PBS's programs) with a monthly or yearly contribution, rather than a one-time premium.

== See also ==
- Telethon
- Underwriting spot
- "The Pledge Drive", an episode of Seinfeld about a WNET pledge drive
- "The One Where Phoebe Hates PBS", an episode of Friends also featuring a WNET pledge drive and guest-starring Gary Collins as the drive's host
