= Stephen Park (actor) =

American comedian and actor

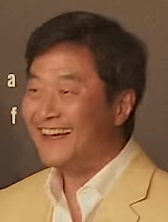
- Park at the 2023 Cannes Film Festival
- Born: Brooklyn, New York, U.S.
- Occupations: Comedian; actor; voice actor
- Years active: 1987–present
- Spouse: Kelly Coffield (m. 1999)
- Children: 2

Stephen Park is an American comedian and actor. He was a cast member of the sketch comedy television series In Living Color during the 1991–1992 season. His film roles include Sonny in Do the Right Thing (1989), Detective Brian in Falling Down (1993), Mike Yanagita in Fargo (1996), and Lieutenant Nescaffier in The French Dispatch (2021). Park's other acting work includes the roles of Mike Sorayama in the Adult Swim animated television series The Venture Bros. and Judge Pete in the critically acclaimed independent film Rocket Science (2007).

== Early life and career ==
Park grew up in Vestal, New York. The son of Korean immigrants, Park began his entertainment career as a stand-up comedian before transitioning into acting.

Park was a cast member on In Living Color. He has appeared in films such as Do the Right Thing (1989), Fargo (1996), A Serious Man (2009), Snowpiercer (2013), The French Dispatch (2021), and Asteroid City (2023). Park has acted in multiple films by the Coen brothers, Bong Joon Ho, and Wes Anderson.

== Personal life ==
Park married Kelly Coffield, another former cast member of In Living Color, in 1999. They have a son and a daughter.

== Advocacy ==
"[T]he 1st AD (assistant director), in a short tirade, called an Asian-American actor to the set over a walkie-talkie with the words, 'I don't have time for this! Where's Hoshi, Toshi or whatever the f--k his name is. Get the oriental guy!' He did not even have the respect to learn the name of the actor, a veteran of 40 years."

— Steve Park, recounting his experience on the set of Friends

In 1997, Park wrote a mission statement in which he called for Hollywood to portray people of Asian descent in a less disparaging light. He wrote the statement after witnessing a racist incident while appearing in a guest role on the television series Friends. In his statement, Park wrote that "In movies and television, Asian characters, mostly men, are subjected to indignity and violence or are tokenized, while Asian women are exploited as objects of sexual desire. You rarely see Asian characters in leading roles that contain any significant power or influence".

Park published his statement as an open letter and it was shared widely online and in the news. He reported that he faced pushback from people in the film industry for his letter but that he would continue his advocacy regardless of the retaliation he faced.

== Filmography ==
=== Film ===
Year	Title	Role	Notes
1989	Do the Right Thing	Sonny	
1990	Quick Change	Grocery Cashier	
1990	Kindergarten Cop	Assistant to Salazar	
1991	Showdown in Little Tokyo	Asian Cop #1	
1992	Kuffs	Officer Favaro	
1992	Toys	Researcher	
1993	Falling Down	Detective Brian	
1996	Fargo	Mike Yanagita	
1996	Sgt. Bilko	Captain Moon	
1996	Red Ribbon Blues	Kris Lee	
1997	Yellow	Alex's Uncle	
1998	Desperate Measures	Dr. Gosha	
2007	Rocket Science	Judge Pete	
2008	The Promotion	David Kim	
2009	State of Play	Chris Kawai	
2009	A Serious Man	Clive's Father	
2010	The Best and the Brightest	George Tanaka-Blumstein	
2010	Morning Glory	Channel 9 Weatherperson	
2012	Price Check	Board Member	
2012	The Brass Teapot	Dr. Li Ling	
2012	Putzel	Song	
2013	Snowpiercer	Fuyu	
2013	Wedding Palace	Kwan	
2014	The Gambler	Number 2	
2015	Don Verdean	Poon-Yen	
2020	Kajillionaire	Another Father	Uncredited
2021	The French Dispatch	Lieutenant Nescaffier	
2023	Ghosted	Utami	
2023	Asteroid City	Roger Cho	
2023	The Good Half	Father Dan	
2025	Mickey 17	Agent Zeke	
2025	Death of a Unicorn	Dr. Song	
2025	The Phoenician Scheme	The Pilot	
2026	Office Romance	Luke	

=== Television ===
Year	Title	Role	Notes
1989	The Days and Nights of Molly Dodd	Deliveryman	Episode: "Here's a Shot in the Dark"
1990	Kojak: Flowers for Matty	Billy	Television film
1990	WIOU	Dr. Kajita	Episode: "They Shoot Sources, Don't They"
1991–1992	In Living Color	Various	28 episodes
1992	MacGyver	Tan Yee	Episode: "The Stringer"
1994	Murder, She Wrote	Joe Yoshanaga	Episode: "Death in Hawaii"
1995	Martin	Mr. Jones	Episode: "Kill Him with Kindness"
1995–1997	Happily Ever After: Fairy Tales for Every Child	I Kwan / Dong (voice)	2 episodes
1996–1997	Friends	Scott Alexander / Phil	2 episodes
1998	Boy Meets World	Jump Master	Episode: "Raging Cory"
1998–1999	Mad About You	Dr. Lee	2 episodes
2004	Law & Order: Criminal Intent	Dr. Shimo	Episode: "Want"
2004	The Venture Bros.	Mike Sorayama (voice)	Episode: "Past Tense"
2005	Hope & Faith	Mr. Yamagoto	Episode: "Carmen Get It"
2005–2008	Law & Order	Dr. Park / Dr. Bruce Chang	2 episodes
2009	The Unusuals	Councilman Tony Harbor	Episode: "Pilot"
2011	White Collar	Paul Sullivan	Episode: "Deadline"
2012	Smash	Reporter #1	Episode: "The Callback"
2012–2013	Elementary	Oren Watson	2 episodes
2013	Phil Spector	Focus Group Man	Television film
2014	Believe	Lim	Episode: "Prodigy"
2014–2015	The Mindy Project	Ray	2 episodes
2015	Person of Interest	Mark Lee	Episode: "Search and Destroy"
2015	12 Monkeys	Yakuza Soldier	Episode: "Shonin"
2017	Law & Order: Special Victims Unit	Eugene Lee	Episode: "Real Fake News"
2019–2020	Warrior	Tu	7 episodes
2021	Infinity Train	Min-Gi's Father (voice)	Episode: "The Twin Tapes"
