= A Star Is Bought =

Studio album by Albert Brooks
- Released: 1975
- Genre: Comedy
- Length: 45:58
- Label: Asylum
- Producers: Albert Brooks; Harry Shearer

Albert Brooks chronology
Comedy Minus One (1973)	A Star Is Bought (1975)

A Star Is Bought is an album by the American comedian Albert Brooks, released in 1975. It is a concept album about the creation of the album itself, with tracks that are produced to attract the attention of various 1970s radio formats, in an attempt to obtain airplay and generate a hit. A Star Is Bought was nominated for a Grammy Award for "Best Comedy Recording". It peaked at No. 205 on the Billboard 200.

== Production ==
The album was written and produced by Brooks and Harry Shearer. Brooks was in part inspired by stories about Motown's business model for making hit records. The disc jockey Charlie Van Dyke provided the narration. Albert King duetted with Brooks on "The Englishman-German-Jew Blues", a track that spoofs progressive FM stations. "The Albert Brooks Show # 112 (August 4, 1943)", a takeoff on The Jack Benny Program, is a bid for nostalgic radio listeners; Brooks attempted to have Benny guest on the track, but the former host thought that Brooks was asking him to participate in a radio program. "Phone Calls from Americans" parodies radio talk shows. "Love Song" adds sexual lyrics to a portion of Maurice Ravel's Boléro. Peter Tork, Alice Cooper, Bill Ballance, Micky Dolenz, Asylum Records label head David Geffen, and Linda Ronstadt, Brooks's girlfriend at the time, were among the many contributors to the album.

== Critical reception ==
Professional ratings
Review scores
Source	Rating
Robert Christgau	B+
The Rolling Stone Record Guide	3/5 stars

The Journal-Herald praised Brooks's "sophisticated, childish, [and] absurd insights". The Daily Press dismissed the album as "poorly conceived and nearly boring". The Record admired the concept but concluded that "the album never gets off the ground." The Los Angeles Times labeled A Star Is Bought "one of those rare comedy/social comment albums that improves with each listening." The Miami Herald opined that "the 'A' side is explosively funny; the 'B' side, at its worst, is fascinating listening."

In 1987, the Chicago Tribune called A Star Is Bought a comedy classic. In 1993, Spin included the album on its list of "Ten Comedy Albums You Need to Have". The Austin American-Statesman, in 2003, considered it "a hysterical tour de force". Cinéaste, in 2017, stated that it is "noteworthy for being unusually cognizant of the importance of the 'business' in show business."

== Track listing ==
A Star Is Bought track listing
No.	Title	Length
1.	"In the Beginning"	2:45
2.	"Phone Call to Americans"	3:27
3.	"Near the Beginning"	1:41
4.	"Party from Outer Space (Featuring Phony Hits)"	1:37
5.	"In the Middle"	1:25
6.	"Phone Calls from Americans"	5:43
7.	"An End in Sight"	2:06
8.	"Love Song"	4:19
9.	"The End of the First Beginning"	1:17
10.	"A New Beginning"	1:15
11.	"Promotional Gimmick"	0:34
12.	"Call This Cut Three, Side Two"	1:18
13.	"The Englishman-German-Jew Blues"	4:39
14.	"The Beginning of the End"	1:26
15.	"The Albert Brooks Show # 112 (August 4, 1943)"	10:43
16.	"The End"	1:43
Total length:		45:58
