= Vampire (1979 film) =

- Genre: Horror
- Screenplay by: Steven Bochco; Michael Kozoll
- Directed by: E. W. Swackhamer
- Starring: Richard Lynch; E. G. Marshall; Jason Miller; Jessica Walter
- Music by: Fred Karlin
- Country of origin: United States
- Original language: English

Production
- Executive producer: Steven Bochco
- Producers: Gregory Hoblit; David Anspaugh
- Production location: San Francisco
- Cinematography: Dennis Dalzell
- Editor: Christopher Nelson
- Production companies: Company Four; MTM Enterprises

Original release
- Network: ABC
- Release: October 7, 1979

Vampire is a 1979 American made-for-television horror film directed by E. W. Swackhamer, co-written and produced by Steven Bochco, and starring Richard Lynch, Jason Miller, E. G. Marshall, Kathryn Harrold, Jessica Walter, and Joe Spinell.

== Premise ==
When a San Francisco estate is converted into a church, Hungarian prince and handsome millionaire Anton Voytek arrives at the dedication ceremonies. Posing as an art collector, Voytek is actually a vampire with an irresistible power over women who has been in the San Francisco Bay area for many years. He manages to escape detection by using various disguises and secret coffins hidden around the city.

During the ceremonies, retired policeman Harry Kilcoyne notices the earth beginning to smoke when the shadow of a cross falls on it.

There then follows a series of puzzling and gruesome murders that send the police searching for a psychotic killer. Harry is convinced that the killings are the work of a vampire when he recalls a similar chain of unsolved homicides committed thirty years ago, so he teams up with a vampire killer to hunt down the vampire.

== Cast ==
- Richard Lynch as Anton Voytek
- Jason Miller as John Rawlins
- E. G. Marshall as Harry Kilcoyne
- Kathryn Harrold as Leslie Rawlins
- Jessica Walter as Nicole DeCamp
- Barrie Youngfellow as Andrea Parker
- Michael Tucker as Christopher Bell
- Jonelle Allen as Brandy
- Scott Paulin as Father Hanley
- Joe Spinell as Captain Desher
- Byron Webster as Selby
- Brendan Dillon as Father Devlin
