= 413 Hope St. =

- Created by: Damon Wayans; Dean Lorey; Janine Sherman
- Starring: Shari Headley; Jesse L. Martin; Kelly Coffield; Michael Easton; Stephen Berra; Dawn Stern; Vincent Laresca; Richard Roundtree; Karim Prince
- Country of origin: United States
- Original language: English
- No. of seasons: 1
- No. of episodes: 10

Production
- Running time: 60 mins.
- Production companies: Nu Systems Productions; 20th Century Fox Television

Original release
- Network: Fox
- Release: September 11, 1997 – January 1, 1998

413 Hope St. is an American drama television series which aired on the Fox network from September 11, 1997 to January 1, 1998. The series was co-created by actor/comedian Damon Wayans, who made a stark departure from his usual comedic work.

The ensemble cast—headed by Richard Roundtree—included Jesse L. Martin, Shari Headley, and Kelly Coffield.

== Premise ==
413 Hope St. was named for the address of a New York City crisis center. Its founder, a successful corporate executive named Phil Thomas (Roundtree), started the center in the building at the site where his teenage son was gunned down after refusing to relinquish his sneakers to a street thug.

The topics addressed by the series included drug addiction and recovery, HIV and AIDS, foster care, re-integration into society after incarceration, and homelessness.

== Cast ==
- Shari Headley as Juanita Harris
- Jesse L. Martin as Antonio Collins
- Kelly Coffield as Sylvia Jennings
- Michael Easton as Nick Carrington
- Stephen Berra as Quentin Jefferson
- Dawn Stern as Angelica Collins
- Vincent Laresca as Carlos Martinez
- Karim Prince as Melvin Todd
- Richard Roundtree as Phil Thomas

== Episodes ==
No.	Title	Directed by	Written by	Original release date	Prod. code
1	"Pilot"	Eric Laneuville	Damon Wayans & Dean Lorey & Janine Sherman	September 11, 1997	5W79
2	"Fatherhood"	Eric Laneuville	Dean Lorey	September 18, 1997	5W01
3	"A Better Place"	Tucker Gates	Takashi Bufford	September 25, 1997	5W02
4	"Redemption"	Oscar L. Costo	Trish Soodik & Remi Aubuchon & Takashi Bufford	October 16, 1997	5W04
5	"Heartbeat"	Arvin Brown	Kathleen McGhee-Anderson	October 23, 1997	5W03
6	"Hate Crimes"	Helaine Head	Remi Aubuchon	December 4, 1997	5W05
7	"Quentin Goes Home"	Eric Laneuville	Dean Lorey	December 11, 1997	5W06
8	"Lost Boys and Gothic Girls"	Ellen S. Pressman	Kathleen McGhee-Anderson & Takashi Bufford	December 18, 1997	5W07
9	"Thanksgiving"	Steven Shaw	Judy McCreary	December 25, 1997	5W08
10	"Falling"	Helaine Head	Trish Soodik & Remi Aubuchon	January 1, 1998	5W09

== Production ==
=== Development ===
Wayans first wrote a draft for the show three years prior to its release, but was unsatisfied with the result, describing the draft as "too melodramatic". After fleshing out the concept to include more comedic elements and complex characters, he pitched the drama to Fox alongside a half-hour sitcom, which later became the show Damon. 413 Hope St. was officially announced as part of Fox’s fall schedule in May 1997.

=== Cancellation ===
The series was cancelled due to low ratings after 10 episodes, with its final broadcast airing on New Year's Day 1998. Its time slot was credited as a contributing factor to the show's low ratings, airing at the same time as Seinfeld on NBC. Following the cancellation, Wayans expressed frustration with Fox's lack of support and limited marketing for the show.

== Broadcast ==
413 Hope St. premiered on Thursdays on Fox, starting on September 11, 1997. The series was temporarily taken off the schedule from October 30 through November 7.

== Reception ==
The show was recognized for its diversity, including its primarily African-American cast as well as its gay characters. According to an annual survey conducted by the New York advertising agency BBDO, 413 Hope St. was the top-rated drama in African-American households.

=== Critical response ===
Julio Martinez of Variety described the show as "gritty but formulaic", and suggested that future episodes be "less predictable and a lot more character-driven". For The New York Times, John Martin wrote that the show "sports a likable cast but could use a more imaginative script". Frazier Moore of Associated Press described the show more negatively, calling it "hopelessly predictable and contrived".
