= The Pledge Drive =

- Seinfeld episode
- Episode no.: Season 6 Episode 3
- Directed by: Andy Ackerman
- Written by: Tom Gammill and Max Pross
- Production code: 603
- Original air date: October 6, 1994

Guest appearances
- Len Lesser as Uncle Leo; Ian Abercrombie as Justin Pitt; Kelly Coffield as Noreen; Billye Ree Wallace as Nana; Brian Reddy as Dan; Rebecca Staab as Kristen; Danny Tartabull as Himself; Tom Wright as Executive; James Reynolds as Banker; Lauren Bowles as Waitress; F.J. Rio as Street Tough

Episode chronology
← Previous "The Big Salad"	Next → "The Chinese Woman"
- Seinfeld season 6

"The Pledge Drive" is the 89th episode of the NBC sitcom Seinfeld. This was the third episode of the sixth season. It aired on October 6, 1994. In this episode, Elaine cannot tell apart her friend Noreen and Noreen's boyfriend over the phone, Jerry overdraws his grandmother's bank account, and George, by eating a Snickers bar snobbishly, gets to take Yankee Danny Tartabull to a PBS pledge drive where Jerry and Kramer are volunteering.

== Plot ==
Jerry is sure that Elaine's friend Noreen was hitting on him. Elaine calls Noreen to prove him wrong, but realizes too late that she is talking to Noreen's boyfriend Dan, whose voice is just as high and feminine as Noreen's. Elaine's indiscretion strains Noreen and Dan's relationship. As Mr. Pitt demands Elaine dish the dirt, she is disconcerted by him eating a Snickers bar with cutlery.

Jerry agrees to appear on a PBS pledge drive, while Kramer joins the phone bank to get a free tote bag. Jerry offends Kristen from PBS by throwing away her thank-you card too early, especially since he keeps every birthday card from his grandmother. Kramer, seeing that each birthday card has a $10 check enclosed, takes offense on Jerry's nana's behalf that they went uncashed.

To make up to Kristen, Jerry asks George to get one of the Yankees for the pledge drive. At a Yankees meeting, George claims that PBS would reach a classier audience than the team's regular broadcast on channel 11 (WPIX-TV, the real-life over-the-air broadcaster for Yankee games at the time of this episode's airing). George pretentiously eats a Snickers like Mr. Pitt, impressing a Yankees executive, who sends Danny Tartabull to the pledge drive while spreading George's practice to Tartabull and Noreen.

Jerry cashes $60 in checks from his nana, overdrawing her neglected bank account and bouncing the checks. She leaves her apartment for the first time in years to visit the bank, mistakenly going to her defunct former branch, and alarming Uncle Leo with her disappearance. He reprimands Jerry for taking money from his low-income nana.

George takes offense at a waitress at Monk's gesticulating with her middle finger to him, then notices the same from another driver while giving Tartabull a ride to the pledge drive. George takes Tartabull an hour out of Manhattan as he vindictively tails the driver, who turns out to have a full-hand cast that sticks his middle finger up.

Elaine explains to Noreen that Dan sounds like her. Having never noticed this before, Noreen cools on Dan and takes an interest in Jerry. After Dan calls Elaine repeatedly in displeasure, Elaine picks up Jerry's nana's call from the bank, and, confusing her voice for Dan's, tells her to drop dead. Assuming Jerry is broke, Uncle Leo forces money on him.

Dan looks for Jerry at the pledge drive; Kramer, misunderstanding Dan's obsession with Jerry, tries to sell Dan on PBS's LGBTQ programming. Nana gets home safely and calls the pledge drive for Jerry, but Kramer answers and convinces her to donate $1,500; Uncle Leo frantically tries to stop the broadcast because she cannot afford this. With Tartabull also no-showing, Jerry gets a disgruntled card from Kristen, while Elaine rants at seeing everyone at Monk's eating convenience food with utensils.

== Production ==
The episode's writers Tom Gammill and Max Pross were talking one day about someone they knew in college who ate his Snickers bars with a knife and fork; Larry David encouraged them to include this in the episode. Because Ian Abercrombie could not chew fast enough to finish a bite of Snickers bar between his lines of dialogue, David told him to swallow each bite whole. Abercrombie recalled that over the course of rehearsals and multiple takes, he consumed the equivalent of about four Snickers bars in this manner, an experience so unpleasant that he has not eaten a Snickers bar since. The day after the episode first aired, Abercrombie was having lunch in a restaurant; while he was waiting for his coffee, the waiter put a plate with a Snickers bar on his table. Apparently, the whole restaurant was in on the joke.

After filming was completed, the producers decided that Brian Reddy's high voice was not high enough, and hired a voice actress to dub over all his lines. The banker's line "Wait, we can do this over the phone" was also added in post by a different actor, since the show's producers realized that the episode made it look like the banker was to blame for Nana's dangerous adventure, which was not the intent.

A number of sequences were filmed but deleted before broadcast, including George demonstrating high-pitched talking and Kramer finding his own greeting card for Jerry in the trash. Due to their inordinate number some of them, such as scenes showing Nana riding a dangerous-looking subway and talking to a postal worker, were not even included on the Seinfeld DVD releases.
