= Shrunken Heads (film) =

- VHS artwork
- Directed by: Richard Elfman
- Written by: Matthew Bright
- Produced by: Charles Band
- Starring: Julius Harris; Meg Foster
- Cinematography: Stephen McNutt
- Edited by: Charles Simmons
- Music by: Richard Band; Danny Elfman
- Production company: Full Moon Entertainment
- Distributed by: Paramount Home Video (United States); The Kushner-Locke Company (all other areas)
- Release date: May 1, 1994
- Running time: 86 minutes
- Country: United States
- Language: English
- Budget: $800,000

Shrunken Heads is a 1994 American independent comedy horror film directed by Richard Elfman and written by Matthew Bright. The film follows three preteen boys who, after being murdered by a vicious gang, are resurrected via voodoo as shrunken heads.

Produced by Full Moon Entertainment and released by Paramount Home Video, this was the last film in which Julius Harris appeared. Director Elfman's brother, Danny Elfman, provided the main theme music, while the rest of the score was composed by Richard Band. Richard's son, Bodhi Elfman, appears in a supporting role.

== Plot ==
New Yorkers Tommy Larson and Bill Turner are best friends who spend their time reading comic books which they buy from Mr. Sumatra's newspaper stand. However, they are also under constant bullying from local hoodlums Vinnie Benedetti, Booger Martin, and Podowski. Tommy also has a major crush on Sally, who happens to be Vinnie's girlfriend. Vinnie works for mob boss "Big Moe", always doing the dirty work.

When newcomer Freddie Thompson gets bullied by Vinnie and the boys, Tommy's attempt to stand up to Vinnie proves futile until Mr. Sumatra saves them as Booger tells Vinnie that something is off with the newspaper stand owner. When Tommy, Bill, and Freddie hatch a plan to have Vinnie and the boys getting busted, Big Moe gets word and she orders Vinnie and the boys to kill the three teens. When they are killed in cold blood, Mr. Sumatra, revealed to be a voodoo priest, resurrects the trio as shrunken heads. Tommy has the power to emit electricity. Bill becomes a vampire. Freddie has the ability to unleash a switchblade from his mouth. The trio uses their new powers to exact revenge and make New York a safe place to live again.

== Cast ==
- Julius Harris as Aristide Sumatra, a voodoo priest and former member of the Haitian Tonton Macoute.
- Meg Foster as Maureen "Big Moe", a tough lesbian mob boss.
- Aeryk Egan as Tommy Larson
- Rebecca Herbst as Sally
- Bo Sharon as Bill Turner
- Bodhi Elfman as Booger Martin
- A.J. Damato as Vinnie Benedetti
- Darris Love as Freddie Thompson
- Troy Fromin as Podowski
- Leigh-Allyn Baker as Mitzi
- Paul Linke as Mr. Larson
- Billye Ree Wallace as Mrs. Wilson
- R.J. Frost as The Vipers
- Randy Vahan as The Plumber

== Release ==
Shrunken Heads had initially been intended for a theatrical release, but due to funding difficulties Full Moon was experiencing at the time these plans were cancelled with director Richard Elfman funding the film's L.A. theatrical opening using his own money.

== Reception ==
Emanuel Levy of Variety called it "only mildly entertaining". J. R. Taylor of Entertainment Weekly rated it B and wrote, "Elfman's fun-loving touches manage to get this new series up and running with twisted enthusiasm". Writing in The Zombie Movie Encyclopedia, academic Peter Dendle said that the characters "lovingly exaggerate every preposterous line with relish, yielding some outrageous dialogue in an otherwise treadmill production."
