= Jerry Belson =

American film director and screenwriter

- Born: July 8, 1938; El Centro, California, U.S.
- Died: October 10, 2006 (aged 68); Los Angeles, California, U.S.
- Spouse: Jo Ann Harris (1975–his death)
- Children: Kristine Belson, Julie Belson, Willi Belson
- Relatives: Monica Johnson (sister)
- Writing career
- Language: English
- Genres: Film writer, television writer
- Notable awards: Emmy Awards

Jerry Belson (July 8, 1938 – October 10, 2006) was an American writer, director, and producer of Hollywood films for over 40 years. Collaborating with figures like Steve Allen and Garry Marshall, Belson gained recognition for his work on various television shows, including The Dick Van Dyke Show and his co-creation of the popular sitcom The Odd Couple. He demonstrated his versatility by venturing into film, co-writing screenplays and directing movies. Belson's impact on comedy and his ability to create enduring characters and relatable narratives left a lasting legacy in the entertainment industry.

== Career ==
Belson's writing credits include the Steven Spielberg films Always and Close Encounters of the Third Kind; several episodes of The Dick Van Dyke Show; Gomer Pyle, U.S.M.C.; and I Spy. During the early 1960s, concurrent with contributing scripts for TV sitcoms with then writing partner Garry Marshall, Belson contributed stories for Gold Key Comics. He also helped produce The Drew Carey Show, The Norm Show, and The Tracey Ullman Show.

In the TV Land 2006 documentary The 100 Greatest TV Quotes and Catchphrases, Lowell Ganz credits Belson with including in the script of the season 3 Odd Couple episode "My Strife in Court" (originally aired Friday, February 16, 1973) the catchphrase "Never ASSUME, because when you ASSUME, you make an ASS of U and ME." Ganz noted that Belson had heard it used years ago by a teacher in a typewriter repair class.

He won three Emmy Awards: two for The Tracey Ullman Show in 1989 and 1990, and one for Tracey Takes On... in 1997.

== Death ==
Belson died of cancer on October 10, 2006, at his home in Los Angeles. His sister, screenwriter Monica Johnson, died on November 1, 2010.

== Credits ==
=== Television ===
- The Dick Van Dyke Show (1961–1966)
- Bob Hope Presents The Chrysler Theater (1964)
- Gomer Pyle U.S.M.C. (1964–1969)
- I Spy (1965–1968)
- Hey Landlord! (1966–1967)
- Love, American Style (1969–1974)
- Barefoot in the Park (1970)
- The Odd Couple (1970–1975)
- Evil Roy Slade (1972)
- Mixed Nuts (pilot) (with Michael J. Leeson) (1977)
- Young Guy Christian (pilot) (with Michael J. Leeson) (1979)
- The Tracey Ullman Show (1987–1990)
- Tracey Takes On... (1996–1999)
- The Drew Carey Show (consulting producer) (1995–2004)
- The Norm Show (consulting producer) (1999–2001)

=== Film ===
- How Sweet It Is! (1968) (with Garry Marshall)
- The Grasshopper (1970)
- Smile (1975)
- Fun with Dick and Jane (with David Giler and Mordecai Richler) (1977)
- Close Encounters of the Third Kind (1977) (uncredited)
- The End (1978)
- Smokey and the Bandit II (with Brock Yates) (1980)
- Student Bodies (1981) (executive producer and voice of The Breather)
- Jekyll and Hyde... Together Again (with Monica Johnson, Harvey Miller and Michael J. Leeson) (1982)
- Surrender (1987)
- Always (1989)

=== Theater ===
- The Roast (1980, with Garry Marshall)
- Smile (1986, adapted from the screenplay)
