= Student Bodies =

1981 film by Mickey Rose

- Theatrical release poster
- Directed by: Mickey Rose
- Written by: Mickey Rose
- Produced by: Michael Ritchie (Note: Credited as Allen Smithee.)
- Starring: Kristen Riter; Matt Goldsby; Cullen Chambers
- Cinematography: Robert Ebinger
- Edited by: Kathryn Ruth Hope
- Music by: Gene Hobson
- Distributed by: Paramount Pictures
- Release date: August 7, 1981
- Running time: 86 minutes
- Country: United States
- Language: English
- Budget: $510,000
- Box office: $5.2 million

Student Bodies is a 1981 American parody slasher comedy film written and directed by Mickey Rose. A spoof of slasher horror films such as Halloween, Friday the 13th, and Prom Night, the film focuses on a serial killer targeting students at a high school. Student Bodies was the first film to satirize the thriving slasher film genre. A prominent feature of the film is a body count that is superimposed onscreen whenever a death occurs.

Principal photography of Student Bodies took place in and around Houston, Texas, with a cast made up entirely of unknown actors. Paramount Pictures released the film theatrically on August 7, 1981. The film was a moderate box office success, grossing $5.2 million in the United States against its $510,000 budget.

== Plot ==
While babysitting on Jamie Lee Curtis' birthday, teenager Julie and her boyfriend Charlie are stalked by a voyeuristic serial killer known as the "Breather". As Julie and Charlie prepare to have sex, the Breather, bypassing conventional weapons such as a butcher knife or hatchet, selects a paper clip which he uses to stab Julie to death, before suffocating Charlie with a trash bag.

After the funerals for Julie and Charlie, the local Lamab High School principal, Mr. Peters, announces the scheduled events for the day, including classes, a parade, football game, and prom. Students Joe and Bertha sneak away to have sex in a car, but Joe realizes he did not bring condoms. While he goes to purchase them, Bertha is clobbered by the Breather with a wooden horse head bookend similar to ones made for a school wood shop project, after which Joe is smothered with a trash bag.

In the girls' locker room, the Breather spies on female students, among them Toby Badger. Hearing the killer's heavy breathing, Toby flees. Later at the parade, Toby's friends Ralph and Dagmar attempt to have sex while inside one of the moving floats. The Breather infiltrates the float, killing Dagmar with an eggplant before smothering Ralph. When Toby investigates, the Breather throws the bodies out the back of the float before escaping, making Toby a suspect. Toby is interrogated by school authorities and police and sent for evaluation by psychologist Dr. Sigmund. When Toby returns to her English class, Principal Peters announces over the school intercom that Sigmund believes Toby is the killer. Miss Mumsley presses Malvert, a former teacher-turned-janitor with a traumatic brain injury, to falsely confess to the killings if Peters becomes a suspect.

At the football game, school Nurse Krud and wood shop teacher tie student Mawamba up inside a garbage bag, as Krud attempts to prove a point that it will suffocate him. The two become distracted by the game, resulting in Mawamba dying. Under the bleachers, Joan and Al sneak away to have sex. When Toby goes to search for them, she is knocked unconscious by falling trash as the Breather murders Joan using a chalkboard eraser, and Al is dispatched with a garbage bag. When Toby regains consciousness, she overhears a conversation suggesting she is being framed, and teams with her friend Hardy to try and find the real killer.

Toby steals a risqué dress from the school's drama prop room and manages to infiltrate the prom unnoticed. While Hardy sneaks into Miss Mumsley's office, Miss Mumsley announces that all of the prom queen candidates, save a student named Patti, are dead; instead of crowning a student, Principal Peters is awarded the title of prom queen. In the wood shop, the Breather kills Patti with the prom crown before smothering her boyfriend Scott with a trash bag. Wood shop teacher Mr. Dumpkin crosses paths with the killer, who uses a chainsaw case to murder him.

Sneaking into Principal Peters's office, Toby is confronted by Peters who admits to having killed all of the female students for having premarital sex. Toby tells him she is a virgin, but he does not believe her. He attempts to kill Toby with a school trophy, but slips on marbles Toby spilled and impales himself to death with it. In Miss Mumsley's office, Toby finds Hardy's body before being confronted by Miss Mumsley, who claims to be Principal Peters's father and the one responsible for killing the male students, whom could have implicated Peters in their girlfriends' murders. Toby flees through the school and witnesses the reanimated corpses of her dead friends stalking her before falling out an upper-story window.

Toby is suddenly awoken by Hardy kissing her as she lay in a hospital bed, having suffered from swine flu—the events depicted are revealed to all be a fever dream. The individuals from Toby's dream are revealed in reality to be the opposite of their personas in her dream state: For example, Mr. Dumpkin is in fact a flamboyant French teacher rather than a burly wood shop instructor, and Patti is an unpopular social outcast. When Toby is released from the hospital, she tells Hardy that Dr. Sigmund had diagnosed her swine flu as stemming from her extreme sexual repression. Toby suggests that she and Hardy have sex to cure her. As she undresses, Hardy dons green gloves and strangles her to death. At Toby's funeral, which is held one hour after her death, Hardy places flowers on the grave, only for Toby's arm to reach up and grab him by the throat.

== Cast ==
- Kristen Riter as Toby Badger
- Matt Goldsby as Hardy
- Cullen G. Chambers as Charles Ray
- Joe Flood as Mr. Dumpkin
- Joe Talarowski as Principal Harlow Hebrew Peters
- Mimi Weddell as Miss Mumsley
- Dario Jones as Mawamba
- Carl Jacobs as Dr. Sigmund
- Peggy Cooper as Ms. Van Dyke
- Janice E. O'Malley as Nurse Krud
- Kevin Mannis as Scott
- Sara Eckhardt as Patti Priswell
- Oscar James as Football Coach/Sheriff
- Kay Ogden as Ms. Leclair
- "The Stick" as Malvert The Janitor
- Brian Batytis as Wheels
- Joan Browning Jacobs as Mrs. Hummers
- Angela Bressler as Julie
- Keith Singleton as Charlie

== Films referenced ==
The screenplay for Student Bodies parodies various horror and slasher films of the era, mainly John Carpenter's Halloween (1978) and Prom Night (1980), bearing similar plot elements of both. It also heavily uses first-person point-of-view shots similar to those featured prominently in Halloween and Friday the 13th (1980). Another element adopted by the film is the screaching violins featured in Alfred Hitchcock's 'Psycho' to accentuate suspenseful or terrifying scenes, although to comedic effect in this film.

The film's climactic sequence in which the events depicted are revealed to have been elements of Toby's fever dream—with the real-life counterparts having personas opposite of those in the dream—is inspired by the finale of The Wizard of Oz (1939). The final scene in which Toby's arms reach out from her grave is a spoof of the final scene in Brian De Palma's Carrie (1976).

== Production ==
=== Development ===
Mickey Rose wrote and directed the film, with executive producer Jerry Belson offering additional material; however, Michael Ritchie was placed on set as an overseeing producer to guide Rose should he need it. The film's production budget was $510,000.

=== Casting ===
Student Bodies features a cast of true unknowns; most of them, including leads Riter and Goldsby, have never made another feature film. Future Travis County Judge and Texas State Senator Sarah Eckhardt appears in a small role.

=== Filming ===
Principal photography of Student Bodies took place on location in Houston and Katy, Texas. Lamar High School in Houston was used as the school in the film. Additional locations included the campus of Texas Southern University and the James E. Taylor High School football field in Katy.

== Release ==
Paramount Pictures, which had recently had significant commercial success with the slasher film Friday the 13th and the comedy Airplane! (both 1980), acquired distribution rights to Student Bodies, purchasing the film for $1.5 million. The studio sought to capitalize on the audiences of both films, which were major box-office hits. Student Bodies was first released theatrically in cities on the U.S. west coast on August 7, 1981. It opened in New York City that fall on October 18, 1981.

The film became a late-night cult favorite on cable after its theatrical release, appearing frequently on the Rhonda Shear-hosted USA Up All Night, as well as the network's USA Saturday Nightmares double feature series.

=== Home media ===
A DVD edition was released by Legend Films on June 3, 2008. Olive Films released the film on Blu-ray on August 25, 2015. The British distributor 88 Films released a Blu-ay in the United Kingdom on November 26, 2018.

In August 2025, Terror Vision announced a forthcoming special edition 4K UHD Blu-ray set originally scheduled for release on October 25, 2025, licensed through Paramount Pictures. After numerous delays due to manufacturing issues, it was finally released on July 9, 2026.

== Reception ==
=== Box office ===
The film grossed $5,165,432 at the U.S. box office.

=== Critical response ===
Vincent Canby of The New York Times called the film "a real disappointment", writing that it "just slowly topples over as you watch it, like a stand-up comedian in the act of failing". Variety found that the jokes became "depressingly repetitive", writing that "unfortunately, once you've seen the trailer, you've seen all but one of the good gags included in the entire film, meaning that there are about three minutes of effective material over the course of the 86-minute running time".

Gene Siskel of the Chicago Tribune gave it two stars out of four, writing that it "exposes all its comic tricks in the first reel, suggesting that the genre itself is not all that deep and that there may be less to parody than one might think". Linda Gross of the Los Angeles Times wrote: "The film has some very funny moments, but it is definitely not another Airplane!". Gary Arnold of The Washington Post wrote: "Although it frequently misfires and occasionally keeps firing away on empty satiric chambers, Student Bodies is a likeably sarcastic and knowing assault on the clichés of horror movies". Ted Mahar of The Oregonian praised the film as a "knowning, clever, brutal and over-long spoof" of slasher films.

On the review aggregator website Rotten Tomatoes, 33% of 9 critics' reviews are positive, with an average rating of 3.8/10. Metacritic, which uses a weighted average, assigned the film a score of 41 out of 100, based on 4 critics, indicating "mixed or average" reviews.

Legend Films released a double feature Blu-ray edition of Student Bodies along with another 1982 horror comedy, Jekyll and Hyde... Together Again on May 3, 2011. Ian Jane of DVD Talk wrote in his Blu-ray review of Student Bodies, "It's one of those movies that shouldn't work at all but somehow, thanks to a combination of odd humor, horror film homage, and a killer who loves girl sweat and spouts off the most inane dialogue imaginable ("Boobs! Boobs! Bellybutton! I'm taking it out of my pants and doing what my mommy told me not to do!") it manages to remain quite entertaining."

== See also ==
- Pandemonium (1982 film)
- Jekyll and Hyde... Together Again

== Sources ==
- Gillota, David (2023). Dead Funny: The Humor of American Horror. Rutgers, New Jersey: Rutgers University Press. ISBN 978-1-978-83418-7.
- Nowell, Richard (2010). Blood Money: A History of the First Teen Slasher Film Cycle. London, England: Bloomsbury. ISBN 978-1-441-12496-8.
- Hutchings, Peter (2009). A to Z of Horror Cinema. Lanham, Maryland: Scarecrow Press. ISBN 978-0-810-87050-5.
