= Kelly Coffield Park =

American actress and comedian (born 1962)

- Born: January 19, 1962 (age 64); Des Plaines, Illinois, U.S.
- Occupations: Actress; comedian
- Years active: 1979–present
- Spouse: Steve Park (m. 1999)
- Children: 2

Kelly Coffield Park (born January 19, 1962) is an American actress and comedian. She is best known for being an original cast member of the sketch comedy television series In Living Color.

== Career ==
From 1990 to 1994, Park was a cast member of the Fox sketch comedy show In Living Color, appearing in every episode. She appeared in the Seinfeld episodes "The Chinese Woman" and "The Pledge Drive" in 1994 as Noreen, whose relationships with men were regularly destroyed by Elaine Benes. She also appeared in the films Quiz Show in 1994 and Jerry Maguire in 1996. In 1997, Park had a supporting role in the short-lived Fox ensemble drama 413 Hope St. She later had a recurring role in the ABC drama Once and Again.

Park appeared in the superhero comedy film The Specials in 2000, and later made brief appearances the films Scary Movie and Little Man. She later appeared in the comedy films College Road Trip (2008), Bride Wars (2009) and Nature Calls (2012). She also made small appearances in the comedy shows My Wife and Kids and 30 Rock, and the dramas Law & Order, Person of Interest, The Good Wife and How to Get Away with Murder.

In 2018, she made an appearance in an episode of Fox's Lethal Weapon. She later guest starred in two episodes of The Young and the Restless in 2019. From 2018 to 2020, Park had a recurring role in the Showtime series Kidding.

== Personal life ==
She married Stephen Park, another former cast member of In Living Color, in 1999. They have a son and a daughter.

== Filmography ==
=== Film ===
Year	Title	Role	Notes
1989	Field of Dreams	Dee, Mark's Wife	Billed as Kelly Coffield
1990	The Kid Who Loved Christmas	Linda Cowley	Billed as Kelly Coffield
1994	Quiz Show	Queens Neighbor	Billed as Kelly Coffield
1994	Floundering	Christi	Billed as Kelly Coffield
1996	Jerry Maguire	Jan	Billed as Kelly Coffield
1998	Rhinos	Rhonda Ramsey	Billed as Kelly Coffield
1999	Ladies Room	Deb	Short; billed as Kelly Coffield
2000	The Specials	Power Chick	Billed as Kelly Coffield
2000	Scary Movie	Teacher	Billed as Kelly Coffield
2005	Lucky 13	Kelly Woodward	Billed as Kelly Coffield
2006	Little Man	The Jeweler	
2007	Mo	Wendy Rabinowitz	Billed as Kelly Coffield
2008	College Road Trip	House Mother	
2009	Bride Wars	Kathy	
2010	The Best and the Brightest	Cindy Tanaka-Blumstein	Billed as Kelly Coffield
2011	The One	Sandy	
2011	The Beaver	Norah's Mom	
2012	Nature Calls	Mrs. Hartnett	
2012	Highway	Ma Gatsfield	
2015	Pant Suits	Maggie Romanick	Short

=== Television ===
Year	Title	Role	Notes
1990–1993	In Living Color	Various / Beverly Trapp / Daisy Werthan	TV series; 114 episodes
1994	Seinfeld	Noreen	2 episodes; billed as Kelly Coffield
1995	If Not for You	Suzette / Suzanne	3 episodes; billed as Kelly Coffield
1995	Martin	Miss Lewis	Episode: "Mother of the Bride"; billed as Kelly Coffield
1995	Tales from the Crypt	Talk Show Host	Episode: "99 & 44/100% Pure Horror"; billed as Kelly Coffield
1996	Wings	Barbara	Episode: "...Like a Neighbor Scorned"; billed as Kelly Coffield
1997	The Jamie Foxx Show	Barbara Richburg	Episode: "I've Fallen and I Won't Get Up"; billed as Kelly Coffield
1997–1998	413 Hope St.	Sylvia Jennings	Main cast; billed as Kelly Coffield
1998	The Wayans Bros.	Mrs. Bliss	Episode: "Marlon Joins a Cult"; billed as Kelly Coffield
1999	Caroline in the City	Joanie	Episode: "Caroline and Joanie and the Stick"; billed as Kelly Coffield
1999–2000	Once and Again	Naomi	Recurring role; billed as Kelly Coffield
2000	Family Law		Episode: "Possession Is Nine Tenths of the Law"; billed as Kelly Coffield
2002–2004	My Wife and Kids	Helen Tyler / Summer Breeze	4 episodes; billed as Kelly Coffield
2003	Hope & Faith	Sue Wagner	Episode: "Anger Management"; billed as Kelly Coffield
2003	Wanda at Large	Rita Dahlberg	Unaired pilot; billed as Kelly Coffield-Park
2005–2009	Law & Order	Joanne Citron / Helen Weiss	2 episodes
2010	The Stay-At-Home Dad	Beverly Gold	1 episode
2010	30 Rock	Aunt Linda	Episode: "Chain Reaction of Mental Anguish"
2012	Person of Interest	Detective Marianne Nichols	Episode: "Many Happy Returns"
2013	The Good Wife	Christy Jurgen	Episode: "Invitation to an Inquest"
2014	See Dad Run	Mandy	Episode: "See Dad Roast the Toast"
2018–2020	Kidding	Joanne	Recurring role; 4 episodes
2018	Lethal Weapon	Peggy	Episode: "Better Living Through Chemistry"
2019	The Young and the Restless	Suzanne Fuller	2 episodes
2019	How to Get Away With Murder	Judge Helen Bines	Episode: "Vivian's Here"

=== Theater ===
Year	Title	Role	Venue	Ref.
1989	Mill Fire	Marlene	Apple Corps Theatre, New York	
1991	Food and Shelter	Lois	Vineyard Theatre, New York	
1995	Sin	Avery	McGinn/Cazale Theatre, New York	
2003	Crimes of the Heart	Lenny Magrath	Actors Theatre of Louisville, Louisville	
2003	Living Out	Linda Billings Farzam	Second Stage Theatre, New York	
2006	Hitting the Wall		Public Theater, New York	
2012	Checkers	Mamie Eisenhower	Vineyard Theatre, New York	
2013	The End of It	Joanna	Matrix Theatre, Los Angeles	
2024	Native Gardens	Virginia Capanini Butley	Pioneer Memorial Theatre, Salt Lake City	
