= Modern Romance (film) =

1981 film by Albert Brooks

- Theatrical release poster
- Directed by: Albert Brooks
- Written by: Albert Brooks; Monica Johnson
- Produced by: Andrew Scheinman; Martin Shafer
- Starring: Albert Brooks; Kathryn Harrold; Bruno Kirby; James L. Brooks; Meadowlark Lemon; George Kennedy
- Cinematography: Eric Saarinen
- Edited by: David Finfer
- Production company: Columbia Pictures
- Distributed by: Columbia Pictures
- Release date: March 13, 1981
- Running time: 94 minutes
- Country: United States
- Language: English
- Box office: $2.9 million

Modern Romance is a 1981 American romantic comedy film directed by and starring Albert Brooks, who also co-wrote the script with Monica Johnson. It also stars Kathryn Harrold, Bruno Kirby, and James L. Brooks.

== Plot ==
In Los Angeles, film editor Robert Cole and his girlfriend, Mary Harvard, have been in a rocky romantic relationship for some time, with Robert repeatedly proposing breaking up before they ultimately reconcile. One evening, Robert claims that though he still loves Mary, he believes that their relationship is a no-win situation, presumes that Mary has cheated on him, and formally breaks up with her, which she obliges. Robert drives to the editing room where his friend and colleague assures him that he made the correct decision. However, he remains distressed and upon returning home, calls Mary, but she does not answer. He then calls Ellen, a woman he met at a wrap party but whose appearance he does not remember, and gets her to agree to a date with him the following night.

The next morning, resolving to move on from Mary and begin life anew, Robert buys running gear. Nonetheless, during a workout, he calls Mary's workplace. The receptionist tells him that she is away from the phone with a male colleague, who Robert assumes is romantically involved with Mary. On his way to pick up Ellen, he stops by Mary's house and annoys her by assuming that she is getting dressed for a date. Ellen gets in the car and Robert drives them around only to drop her back off at her place, telling her that he made a mistake in calling her the previous night but may call her again in the future. At a department store, Robert buys toys to make amends with Mary and leaves them at her doorstep. After much anxious waiting, he receives a call from Mary, who tells him that she misses him. They spend the night at her place.

While getting ready for the day, Robert chances upon a telephone bill indicating that Mary recently made multiple long-distance calls to the same number in New York City, one late at night and the other early in the morning, but both lasting around an hour. During work, the director invites Robert and Mary to a party at his home, an offer he fails to turn down. There, Robert struggles to enjoy himself because he is distracted by Mary's conversations with other male attendees and a male guest who compliments her appearance to him.

To ensure that Mary is committed to their relationship, Robert proposes a romantic date for the following evening. Nevertheless, she turns it down at the last minute on account of work obligations. Frustrated, Robert calls the New York number that Mary dialed; the intended recipient is not there and the person who answered the phone seems to be male. When he later calls Mary's workplace, he is told that she has left with a group of people and given a possible restaurant where they may be. At the restaurant, Robert does not convince Mary to leave her work dinner but persuades her to go with him on a weekend getaway.

Arriving at their cabin in Idyllwild, California, Mary leaves almost immediately to make a phone call to a friend to communicate a mundane detail. However, Robert watches her smiling on the phone from a distance and asks her about the call as well as her long-distance calls. When he refuses to accept her claim that the New Yorker is her brother's girlfriend, Mary tries to break up with him, only for Robert to interrupt her with a marriage proposal and explanation of his actions as being the result of his unbridled love for her. She accepts. A textual epilogue reveals that Robert and Mary married three weeks later in Las Vegas, divorced the following month, and are now dating with plans to remarry.

== Cast ==
- Albert Brooks as Robert Cole
- Kathryn Harrold as Mary Harvard
- Bruno Kirby as Jay
- James L. Brooks as David
- Bob Einstein as sporting goods salesman
- Jane Hallaren as Ellen
- Albert Henderson as head mixer
- Meadowlark Lemon as himself
- George Kennedy as himself / Zoron

== Production ==
Bruno Kirby co-stars as Jay, Robert's co-worker and confidant, and Brooks' brother Bob Einstein, best known as hapless daredevil Super Dave Osborne, plays a pushy salesman at a sporting goods store.

A third brother, Cliff, has a cameo in the scenes set in the recording studio. He plays the music mixer, the bald man sitting to the left of the head mixer, who gets up and goes to his car during the break.

David, the director of the film that Robert is editing, is played by real-life film director James L. Brooks – no relation to Albert. He would later return the favor by casting Albert in his Academy Award-nominated role of Aaron Altman in Broadcast News.

According to Albert Brooks, Stanley Kubrick was a big fan of the film. He tells the story that Kubrick called him after viewing the film and asked, "How did you make this movie? I've always wanted to make a movie about jealousy."

Principal photography began on May 12, 1980, in Los Angeles, and concluded in mid-July, lasting ten weeks.

== Reception ==
On the review aggregator website Rotten Tomatoes, the film holds an approval rating of 83% based on 23 reviews, with an average rating of 6.4/10. The website's critics consensus reads: "Modern Romance contains all the hallmarks of Albert Brooks' best work: darkly funny, confrontational, and chock full of pithy observations about human behavior."
