= MacGruder and Loud =

- Genre: Police procedural Crime drama
- Created by: Lane Slate
- Starring: John Getz; Kathryn Harrold
- Composer: Paul Chihara
- Country of origin: United States
- Original language: English
- No. of seasons: 1
- No. of episodes: 15

Production
- Executive producer: Aaron Spelling
- Producer: Robert H. Justman
- Production location: Los Angeles
- Running time: 60 minutes
- Production company: Aaron Spelling Productions

Original release
- Network: ABC
- Release: January 20 – April 30, 1985

MacGruder and Loud is an American crime drama from Aaron Spelling Productions that aired on ABC from January 20 to April 30, 1985.

== Premise ==
The series stars John Getz and Kathryn Harrold as married police officers Malcolm MacGruder and Jenny Loud in a Los Angeles Police Department-styled police agency (where strict anti-fraternization policies were in effect). They fought a battle every day to keep it a closely guarded secret from their boss, Sgt. Hanson (played by veteran actor Lee de Broux).

Malcolm and Jenny lived in a duplex-type apartment complex where there was a secret door behind the grandfather clock in her apartment, where Malcolm could sneak in and enjoy her company.

== Cast ==
- John Getz as Det. Malcolm MacGruder
- Kathryn Harrold as Det. Jenny Loud MacGruder
- Ted Ross as Det. Sgt. Debbin
- Frank McCarthy as Sgt. Myhrum

== Episodes ==
No.	Title	Directed by	Written by	Original release date
1	"Pilot"	Jerry London	Lane Slate	January 21, 1985
2	"Pilot"	Jerry London	Lane Slate	January 21, 1985
3	"The Violation"	Jerry London	Unknown	January 22, 1985
4	"The Inside Man"	Richard Compton	Unknown	January 29, 1985
5	"Odds Favor Death"	Stan Lathan	Unknown	February 5, 1985
6	"On the Wire"	Victor Hsu	Steve Kreinberg & Andy Guerdat	February 12, 1985
7	"Cop Killer"	Richard Compton	Unknown	February 26, 1985
8	"Under Special Circumstances"	Stan Lathan	Unknown	March 5, 1985
9	"Sanctuary"	Richard Compton	Stephen Kandel	March 12, 1985
10	"Stepover Man"	Bill Duke	Unknown	March 19, 1985
11	"For Better or for Worse"	James L. Conway	Unknown	March 26, 1985
12	"The Price of Junk"	Charlie Picerni	Unknown	April 9, 1985
13	"The Very Scary Man"	Richard Compton	Mike Robe	April 16, 1985
14	"Act of War"	Rick Wallace	Unknown	April 23, 1985
15	"Tarnished Blues"	James L. Conway	Jaysen D. Hayes	April 30, 1985

== Production ==
This was one of the relatively few failures from Aaron Spelling's production company in its history, since it was picked by ABC to debut right after the Super Bowl in 1985 and was heavily promoted during the game. The promotion resulted in high ratings at first, but the series was cancelled three months into its run. The ratings decline was blamed on ABC's repeated changing of the show's timeslot before settling on Monday nights at 10:00 p.m., known as "the graveyard slot". It ranked 36th out of 77 shows with a 14.9 rating and a 23 share.

Because of the frequent commercials during the Super Bowl, the following night Johnny Carson asked rhetorically during his monologue on The Tonight Show, "Did you see that new show, 'Frequent and Loud'?"

The series was rushed into production by ABC in order to capitalize on the popularity of another crime drama at that time, Cagney & Lacey (which aired on CBS).
