= Jekyll and Hyde... Together Again =

1982 American comedy film directed by Jerry Belson

Jekyll and Hyde...Together Again
- Directed by: Jerry Belson
- Written by: Monica Johnson; Harvey Miller; Jerry Belson; Michael J. Leeson
- Based on: Strange Case of Dr. Jekyll and Mr. Hyde; 1886 novella by Robert Louis Stevenson
- Produced by: Lawrence Gordon
- Starring: Mark Blankfield; Bess Armstrong; Krista Errickson; Tim Thomerson; Michael McGuire
- Cinematography: Philip H. Lathrop
- Edited by: Billy Weber
- Music by: Barry De Vorzon
- Distributed by: Paramount Pictures
- Release date: October 1, 1982
- Running time: 87 minutes
- Country: United States
- Language: English
- Budget: $5 million
- Box office: $3,792,188

Jekyll and Hyde...Together Again is a 1982 sex comedy based on the 1886 novella Strange Case of Dr. Jekyll and Mr. Hyde by Robert Louis Stevenson and stars Mark Blankfield, Bess Armstrong, Tim Thomerson, Krista Errickson, Cassandra Peterson, and Michael McGuire.

In the film, the surgeon Dr. Daniel Jekyll collapses from physical and mental exhaustion while experimenting with a type of powdered drug. His accidental inhalation of the powder transforms him into Hyde, a more confident persona. A love triangle forms between Jekyll/Hyde, his would-be-bride Mary Carew, and the nightclub performer Ivy Venus. Both women eventually learn about his two personalities, but Mary is only interested in Hyde and Ivy is only interested in Jekyll. The two women eventually hold their love interest captive, while negotiating with each other in a cemetery about a mutually beneficial deal.

== Plot ==
A group of medical students observe Dr. Daniel Jekyll perform brain surgery at Our Lady of Pain and Suffering Hospital in Los Angeles, California. Hubert Howes, the world's richest man, watches a recording of the procedure from his hospital bed, hoping to recruit Jekyll to perform the world's first "total transplant," replacing every organ at once. Howes threatens to blow up the hospital if his procedure does not occur as planned. Dr. Carew, hospital overseer and Jekyll's future father-in-law, forbids Jekyll from marrying his daughter, Mary, if he does not comply with Howes' wishes.

Jekyll attends to patients in the charity ward when Mary visits, complaining that he missed their lunch date because he was working. Dr. Knute Lanyon flirts with Mary. After Mary leaves, a patient named Ivy Venus flirts with Jekyll and invites him to visit her at the nightclub where she works.

Later, Jekyll returns to his work, measuring two white powders on a square mirror. Exhausted and unable to focus, he drops the powders on the table. He falls asleep and accidentally inhales the powder, causing him to transform. With an air of wild confidence, he bags more of the powdered drug, steals a car, and drives to Ivy's club. After Ivy performs onstage, she takes him to her room backstage and undresses. He introduces himself as "Hyde" and they have sex. The next morning, Jekyll, regretting his actions, declares his unwavering love to Mary.

Over the next few days, Jekyll makes various attempts to dispose of his drug, but always ends up deciding to inhale more, which leads to comical and sexually charged exploits.

Jekyll wins a research grant, and is invited to a ceremony in London, England. Hoping to use the money to buy Ivy's affection, Hyde finds her at an arcade and invites her to accompany him on his trip. Ivy says she prefers Jekyll to Hyde. When he reveals that they are both the same man, she does not believe him; in his frustration, he destroys an arcade game, and Ivy is electrocuted. Hyde travels to Los Angeles International Airport and climbs onto the back of an airplane headed for London. Ivy revives and travels to London via train vowing her revenge.

At the ceremony, actor George Chakiris accepts the award on the doctor's behalf, declaring that the remaining vial of Jekyll's substance will be donated. Hyde swings down from the balcony, grabbing the microphone and singing. Realizing that Hyde is the same man as her fiancé, Mary becomes aroused by his new personality. Hyde removes his pants, runs out of the hall and is chased through the foggy streets by the audience members. Ivy joins the crowd, and they follow him until he falls off the side of a building. As Ivy and Mary kneel next to Hyde's body, he transforms back into Jekyll. Upon waking, he claims that the drugs have exposed the two sides of his split personality. Mary desires Hyde, while Ivy wants Jekyll, and the two women drag him through a cemetery, agreeing to work out an arrangement.

Nearby, the skeletal corpse of Robert Louis Stevenson rolls over in its grave.

== Cast ==
- Mark Blankfield as Jekyll and Hyde
- Bess Armstrong as Mary Carew
- Krista Errickson as Ivy
- Tim Thomerson as Dr. Knute Lanyon
- Michael McGuire as Dr. Carew
- Neil Hunt as Queen
- Cassandra Peterson as Busty Nurse
- Jessica Nelson as Barbara Blau
- Peter Brocco as Hubert Howes
- Mary McCusker as Female Patient
- Liz Sheridan as Mrs. Larson
- Lin Shaye as Nurse With Telegram
- George Wendt as Injured Man
- Glen Chin as Sushi Chef No. 1
- Virginia Wing as Madame Woo Woo
- Jack Collins as Baron Von Horsch
- Barrett Oliver as Child in Supermarket
- Tony Cox as Lawn Jockey No. 1
- Selwyn Emerson Miller as Lawn Jockey No. 2
- Art LaFleur as Clock Repairman (credited as Art La Fleur)
- George Chakiris as Himself

== Production ==
In spring of 1981, word of an impending strike by the Directors Guild of America reached the studio heads at Paramount. Michael Eisner and Barry Diller decided to expedite production of several low-budget films to have product ready for distribution should the strike occur. Eisner and head of production Don Simpson each chose a few screenplays they personally liked and thought could be produced cheaply and quickly. Jekyll and Hyde...Together Again was one of Eisner's choices, along with White Dog and I'm Dancing as Fast as I Can.

== Release ==
The film was given a theatrical release in the United States by Paramount Pictures in October 1982. It grossed $3,792,188 and was considered a box-office bomb.

== Reception ==
Janet Maslin of The New York Times wrote in her review that Jekyll and Hyde... Together Again was, "A coarse, dopey update of the old story, featuring a Jekyll (Mark Blankfield) who snorts a cocaine-like potion to become the sex-crazed, necklace-wearing, hip-talking swinger who is Hyde."

Ian Jane of DVD Talk said, "This movie is very much a product of its time. Inspired by disco culture and a skewed idea of punk rock, Jekyll And Hyde Together Again is ripe with political incorrectness and bas, juvenile humor. That said, many of the gags are still funny, even if they are dumber than dirt."

Francis Rizzo III, also of DVD Talk, wrote in his review, "Jekyll & Hyde...Together Again is a bizarre, uneven film that will likely appeal most to people who remember the go-go ‘80s fondly, or perhaps have no memory of the ‘80s, yet still lived through it, if you catch my drift."

Kurt Dahlke of DVD Talk said, "I hope that over-indulgence of cocaine is to blame for this early-'80s monstrosity, but that would be too obvious. Leaden pacing, a dearth of funny jokes, zany gags or other amusements, poorly considered outrageous humor and the most ferociously aggressive ham-sandwich of a performance ever put on film makes Together Again rather difficult to sit through."

== See also ==
- Student Bodies
- Pandemonium (1982 film)
