= The Chinese Woman =

- Seinfeld episode
- Episode no.: Season 6 Episode 4
- Directed by: Andy Ackerman
- Written by: Peter Mehlman
- Production code: 604
- Original air date: October 13, 1994

Guest appearances
- Jerry Stiller as Frank Costanza; Estelle Harris as Estelle Costanza; Kelly Coffield as Noreen; Angela Dohrmann as Donna Chang; Will Utay as Dr. Korval; Lucy Lin as Hostess; Jack Tracy as Man

Episode chronology
← Previous "The Pledge Drive"	Next → "The Couch"
- Seinfeld season 6

"The Chinese Woman" is the 90th episode of the NBC sitcom Seinfeld. This was the fourth episode for the sixth season. It aired on October 13, 1994. In this episode, a woman named Donna Chang benefits from goodwill towards Chinese people, George's father is seen with a mysterious caped man, Kramer must give up wearing briefs to restore his sperm count, and Elaine accidentally sabotages her friend Noreen's love life again.

== Plot ==
Jerry lets Elaine carry his groceries home for him. They are puzzled at Frank Costanza meeting an unidentified man in a cape, and cross the street to avoid them. Due to crossed phone lines, every call for George goes to a woman named Donna Chang. Jerry uses this chance to ask Donna out, musing that he likes Chinese women. Elaine is surprised that Donna picked a Chinese restaurant.

Kramer is enduring the discomfort of his shrunken briefs, but Elaine is concerned that they will reduce his sperm count. Since he has never caused a pregnancy in his long sexual history, Kramer fears that he will be the last of his line. A fertility clinic confirms that Kramer is low on sperm, and prescribes wearing boxer shorts exclusively. Unable to kick his briefs habit, Kramer forces Jerry to take all his briefs, then embraces going commando outright.

George asks his father about the caped man, but only tips him off that Jerry and Elaine avoided him. Noreen has already moved on to a new boyfriend: Paul, a "long talker" who makes boring, interminable chitchat when answering calls. Elaine hangs up every time Paul answers for Noreen, since she cannot disengage once he gets going. This creates the impression that another man is calling Noreen, straining her relationship with Paul.

Donna turns out to be Caucasian, with Chang being shortened from "Changstein". Jerry realizes that Donna welcomes misunderstandings over her last name, which she uses gratuitously. Donna gets a call from Estelle Costanza, who opens up to Donna and divulges that she is getting a divorce. George immediately becomes suicidal from the news, then complains that he will need to visit his parents separately. George suspects the caped man, but Jerry cites Superman in defense of caped people.

Elaine explains to Noreen that Paul is boring, which Noreen never noticed before. Jerry is appalled by Elaine putting Noreen off another boyfriend so soon, and reminds Elaine that Noreen is so impressionable that she both joined the army, and deserted, on Elaine's advice. Donna talks Estelle out of the divorce by quoting Confucian wisdom, and gets invited over for dinner. George finally learns that the caped man is his father's lawyer, who does not "follow the trends". When Estelle sees that Donna is not Chinese, she feels deceived and proceeds with the divorce after all.

Kramer seizes his chance to get together with Noreen, and, taking charge, cuts off Elaine and makes Noreen reenlist. George kvetches at his parental visits now taking a whole day, while Kramer triumphantly announces that Noreen is having her period late. Later, Noreen is about to jump off the Brooklyn Bridge, but Frank's caped lawyer heroically leads her to safety.

== Production ==
Some of Seinfeld's ad-libs were cut for time. He responded to Kramer's declaration "I feel like a naked, innocent boy roaming the countryside" with "Someone better warn the sheep quick", and when George puts his head in the oven, he improvised "George, it's an electric." Cut scenes include George angrily confronting the man in the cape, who is played by an uncredited Larry David.
