= Private Benjamin (1980 film) =

1980 film by Howard Zieff

- Theatrical release poster
- Directed by: Howard Zieff
- Written by: Nancy Meyers; Charles Shyer; Harvey Miller
- Produced by: Nancy Meyers; Harvey Miller; Charles Shyer; Goldie Hawn
- Starring: Goldie Hawn; Eileen Brennan; Armand Assante; Robert Webber; Sam Wanamaker; Barbara Barrie; Mary Kay Place; Harry Dean Stanton; Albert Brooks
- Cinematography: David M. Walsh
- Edited by: Sheldon Kahn
- Music by: Bill Conti
- Distributed by: Warner Bros.
- Release date: October 10, 1980
- Running time: 109 minutes
- Country: United States
- Budget: $9.2 million
- Box office: $100 million (worldwide)

Private Benjamin is a 1980 American comedy film directed by Howard Zieff, written by Nancy Meyers, Charles Shyer, and Harvey Miller, and starring Goldie Hawn, Eileen Brennan, and Armand Assante.

The film was one of the biggest box office hits of 1980, grossing $100 million in worldwide against its $9 million budget, and also spawned a short-lived television series starring Lorna Patterson as Judy Benjamin, with Brennan reprising her role as Captain Lewis. It received three nominations at the 53rd Academy Awards: Best Actress (Hawn), Best Supporting Actress (Brennan), and Best Screenplay – Written Directly for the Screen. Private Benjamin ranked No. 82 on the American Film Institute's 100 Years...100 Laughs list, and No. 59 on Bravo's list of "100 Funniest Movies".

== Plot ==
Judy Benjamin, a 28-year-old Jewish woman from a sheltered wealthy upbringing whose lifelong dream is to "marry a professional man", is devastated after Yale Goodman, her new husband, dies on their wedding night. Emotionally adrift, Judy tells her story on a radio call-in show and meets another caller, Army recruiter SFC James Ballard, who leads her to believe military life will provide the "family" she seeks. He also pitches the service pointing out attractive duty stations and that it has benefitted women. Judy has a rude awakening upon arriving at basic training at Fort Biloxi. Army regulations and the disapproval of Captain Doreen Lewis and Sergeant First Class L.C. Ross, the drill sergeant, frustrate Judy.

When Judy is caught trying to desert, she is reunited with her parents. However, when her parents say they will make all her decisions, she resolves to graduate basic training to forge her own way in life. At a war games exercise, Judy and some other recruits lead a sneak attack that captures the opposing team, impressing Colonel Thornbush, the unit commander. Upon graduation from basic training, Judy and her friends spend the weekend on leave in New Orleans, where she meets Henri Tremont, a French doctor attending a medical conference. After a brief but inspiring romance, Henri returns to Paris, and Judy begins training with an elite paratrooper unit, the Thornbirds.

Judy quickly discovers that she was chosen for paratrooper training because unit commander Colonel Thornbush finds her attractive. Because she is too scared to jump after the other trainees have jumped from the plane, he attempts to sexually assault her. When Judy jumps out of the plane rather than comply, he attempts to have her transferred. Judy negotiates an assignment to Supreme Headquarters Allied Powers Europe (SHAPE) in Belgium and meets up with Henri again on a visit to Paris. He proposes marriage, and she accepts. After Captain Lewis discovers that Tremont is a communist, Judy resigns from the Army.

Following his engagement to Judy, Henri reveals his self-centered, controlling nature. He tries to "remake" Judy and insists she sign a prenuptial agreement. Finally, when Henri sleeps with the housemaid and makes it obvious that he has not gotten over his ex-girlfriend Clare, Judy has a change of heart. On the day of the wedding ceremony, she punches Henri and abandons him at the altar, throws her bridal veil into the wind, and walks alone into the unknown, empowered by her newfound freedom.

== Cast ==
- Goldie Hawn as Private Judith Benjamin
- Eileen Brennan as Captain Doreen Lewis
- Armand Assante as Henri Alan Tremont
- Robert Webber as Colonel Clay Thornbush
- Sam Wanamaker as Theodore Benjamin, Judy's father
- Barbara Barrie as Harriet Benjamin, Judy's mother
- Mary Kay Place as Private/2nd Lieutenant Mary Lou Glass
- Harry Dean Stanton as Sergeant First Class Jim Ballard
- Albert Brooks as Yale Goodman
- Richard Herd as Brigadier General Foley
- Toni Kalem as Private Gianelli
- Damita Jo Freeman as Private Gloria Moe
- Alston Ahern as Private P. J. Soyer
- Gretchen Wyler as Aunt Kissy
- Craig T. Nelson as Captain William Woodbridge
- Hal Williams as Drill Sergeant L. C. Ross
- P. J. Soles as Private Wanda Winter
- Wil Albert as Lieutenant Rahmi
- Denise Halma as Gabrielle
- Lee Wallace as Mr. Waxman
- Alan Oppenheimer as Rabbi
- Maxine Stuart as Aunt Betty
- Helen Baron, Paul Marin, and Mimi Maynard as the Lemish family
- Lillian Adams as Mrs. Goodman
- Alice Hirson as Mrs. Thornbush
- Sally Kirkland as Helga

== Reception ==
The film holds a score of 84% on Rotten Tomatoes based on 37 reviews. The site's consensus reads: "Private Benjamin proves a potent showcase for its Oscar-nominated star, with Goldie Hawn making the most of a story that rests almost completely on her daffily irresistible charm."

Roger Ebert gave the film three stars out of four and praised it as "an appealing, infectious comedy" in a review that concluded: "Goldie Hawn, who is a true comic actress, makes an original, appealing character out of Judy Benjamin, and so the movie feels alive, not just an exercise in gags and situations." Vincent Canby of The New York Times called Hawn "totally charming" and praised Zieff's "great skill at keeping the gags aloft and in finding new ways by which to free the laughs trapped inside old routines about latrine duty, war games, forced marches and calisthenics." Gene Siskel of the Chicago Tribune gave the film 3.5 stars out of 4, calling it "old-fashioned, commercial Hollywood filmmaking at its best — an upbeat, delightful comedy with a gentle message." Variety wrote that the film "is actually a double feature — one is a frequently funny tale of an innocent who is conned into joining the U.S. Army and her adventures therein; the other deals with the same innocent's personality problems as a Jewish princess with only an intermittent chuckle to help out." Charles Champlin of the Los Angeles Times panned the film, calling it "a movie you don't salute, you court martial. It may or may not violate the Articles of War but it raises holy hob with the laws of film making, the first of which is that you start with a good script." Gary Arnold of The Washington Post called it "a peculiarly unappealing throwback to the traditional service comedies like Buck Privates, Caught in the Draft, See Here, Private Hargrove, et al.," with an "aimless screenplay" that leaves Hawn's character "less likable than the one at the beginning." Pauline Kael of The New Yorker wrote: "Goldie Hawn demonstrates what an accomplished comedienne she is—she carries Private Benjamin on her back." David Ansen of Newsweek called the film "an uneven but highly enjoyable mixture of sociological satire, basic-training slapstick and feminist fable."

=== Box office ===
Private Benjamin grossed $4,739,769 from 763 theaters in its opening weekend, finishing at the top of the US box office. It added 36 more screens the following weekend and increased its gross to $4,935,571, finishing number one again, with a 10-day gross of $11.5 million. On a final production budget of $9.2 million, it earned almost $70 million at the box office.

== Awards and nominations ==
Award	Category	Recipient	Result	Ref.
Academy Awards	Best Actress	Goldie Hawn	Nominated	
Academy Awards	Best Supporting Actress	Eileen Brennan	Nominated	
Academy Awards	Best Screenplay – Written Directly for the Screen	Nancy Meyers, Charles Shyer and Harvey Miller	Nominated	
Golden Globe Awards	Best Actress in a Motion Picture – Musical or Comedy	Goldie Hawn	Nominated	
National Society of Film Critics Awards	Best Actress	Goldie Hawn	3rd Place	
New York Film Critics Circle Awards	Best Actress	Goldie Hawn	Runner-up	
Writers Guild of America Awards	Best Comedy Written Directly for the Screen	Nancy Meyers, Charles Shyer and Harvey Miller	Won	

The film is recognized by American Film Institute in these lists:

- 2000: AFI's 100 Years...100 Laughs – #82
- 2005: AFI's 100 Years...100 Movie Quotes:
  - Pvt. Judy Benjamin: "I did join the Army, but I joined a different Army. I joined the one with the condos and the private rooms." – Nominated

== Television series ==
In 1981, Private Benjamin was made into an Emmy- and Golden Globe-winning television series of the same title that ran from 1981 to 1983. Set during the events of the film, it starred Lorna Patterson, Eileen Brennan, Hal Williams, Lisa Raggio, Wendie Jo Sperber and Joel Brooks. For the series, Brennan and Williams reprised their film roles, again portraying Captain Doreen Lewis and Sergeant L. C. Ross respectively.

== Remake ==
In March 2010, Anna Faris was cast to portray Judy Benjamin in a Private Benjamin remake from New Line Cinema, but in May 2014, it was confirmed that Rebel Wilson would portray Benjamin in the remake. Amy Talkington was in discussion to write the script, which would update both the story and screenplay on which Harvey Miller, Nancy Meyers, and Charles Shyer had initially collaborated. Mark Gordon was set to produce.

The new adaptation Talkington was exploring would reset Miller's, Meyers', and Shyer's story in present-day and set it against the backdrop of current military conflicts. According to insiders, the studio wanted neither to make fun of military service people nor take political potshots, but sought instead to focus on the empowerment elements and build upon the fish-out-of-water comedy.

== See also ==
- Never Wave at a WAC (1953)
- She's in the Army Now (1981 TV)
- Cadet Kelly (2002 TV)
- Private Valentine: Blonde & Dangerous (2008)
