= Monica Johnson =

American screenwriter (1946–2010)

- Born: Monica Lenore Belson; February 21, 1946; Colorado, U.S.
- Died: November 1, 2010 (aged 64); Los Angeles, California, U.S.
- Other names: Monica McGowan; Monica McGowan Johnson
- Occupation: Screenwriter
- Years active: 1973–1999
- Relatives: Jerry Belson (brother)

Monica Johnson (February 21, 1946 – November 1, 2010) was an American screenwriter whose film credits included Mother, Lost in America, Modern Romance, Jekyll and Hyde... Together Again and The Muse. Her television credits included The Mary Tyler Moore Show, Laverne & Shirley and It's Garry Shandling's Show. She was a frequent collaborator with Albert Brooks.

== Early life ==
Johnson was born Monica Lenore Belson in 1946 in Colorado, but was raised in El Centro, California and spent her early years in medical and dental assistants' school.

== Career ==
Her brother, Jerry Belson, an Emmy Award-winning screenwriter and film producer, hired her to type scripts for the TV series The Odd Couple around 1972; noticing that his sister added jokes to the scripts which met with the producers' approval, he suggested that she partner with Marilyn Suzanne Miller to form a writing team. Initially working under her married name of Monica Mcgowan in 1973, she and Miller wrote one script for The Paul Lynde Show and three scripts for The Mary Tyler Moore Show. For the second script, having remarried, she was credited as Monica Mcgowan Johnson. By the time of the third script in 1974, she was credited as Monica Johnson, the professional name she used for the rest of her career.

Miller and Johnson broke up as a writing team in 1974; Miller became one of the original writers for Saturday Night Live in 1975, while Johnson wrote two scripts for the Paul Sand series Friends and Lovers. Johnson wound up making uncredited contributions to the first season of SNL, when she began to collaborate with Albert Brooks and Harry Shearer on the scripts for Brooks's series of seven short films for the show.

In 1976, Johnson co-created the NBC pilot The Cheerleaders, which did not go to series. Following this, she became a writer/producer on Laverne & Shirley and co-created the CBS sitcom pilot The Plant Family, which was not picked up to series. Following this, she began her long-term screenwriting collaboration with Albert Brooks, co-writing the 1979 film Real Life with him and Shearer. Shearer fell out of Brooks's orbit following this movie, leaving Brooks and Johnson to become a writing duo. The two co-wrote five more of Brooks' films over the following two decades, Modern Romance, Lost In America, The Scout, Mother, and The Muse.

Johnson also co-wrote the 1979 film Americathon, the 1982 film Jekyll and Hyde... Together Again (with her brother Jerry Belson, who also directed), and wrote for the fourth season of It's Garry Shandling's Show and the one-season Alan Zweibel-created sitcom Good Sports. She wrote the unpublished book Penny Saver and an unproduced screenplay for a movie called Marrying for Money.

== Personal life ==
Johnson, a resident of Palm Springs, California, died of esophageal cancer at Cedars-Sinai Medical Center in Los Angeles on November 1, 2010, aged 64.

== Awards ==
- National Society of Film Critics Award for Best Screenplay, 1985, Lost in America
- National Society of Film Critics Award for Best Screenplay, 1996, Mother

== Filmography ==
- The Paul Lynde Show (1973, TV)
- The Mary Tyler Moore Show (1973–1974, TV)
- Paul Sand in Friends and Lovers (1974, TV)
- The Cheerleaders (1976, TV pilot)
- Laverne & Shirley (1977–1978, 1982, TV)
- The Plant Family (1978, TV pilot)
- Real Life (1979)
- Americathon (1979)
- Modern Romance (1981)
- Jekyll and Hyde... Together Again (1982)
- Lost in America (1985)
- It's Garry Shandling's Show (1989–1990, TV)
- Good Sports (1991, TV)
- The Scout (1994)
- Mother (1996)
- The Muse (1999)
