= Lost in America =

1985 film directed by Albert Brooks

- Theatrical release poster
- Directed by: Albert Brooks
- Written by: Albert Brooks; Monica Johnson
- Produced by: Marty Katz
- Starring: Albert Brooks; Julie Hagerty
- Cinematography: Eric Saarinen
- Edited by: David Finfer
- Music by: Arthur B. Rubinstein
- Production company: The Geffen Company
- Distributed by: Warner Bros.
- Release date: March 15, 1985 (U.S.)
- Running time: 91 minutes
- Country: United States
- Language: English
- Budget: $4 million
- Box office: $10,179,000

Lost in America is a 1985 American satirical road comedy film directed by Albert Brooks and co-written by Brooks with Monica Johnson. The film stars Brooks alongside Julie Hagerty as a married couple who decide to quit their jobs and travel across America.

== Plot ==
David and Linda Howard are typical 1980s yuppies in Los Angeles, dissatisfied with their bourgeois lifestyle. He works in an advertising agency and she for a department store, but after failing to receive an expected promotion and instead being asked to transfer to the firm's office in New York City, David angrily insults his boss, and he is fired. David coaxes his wife to quit her job as well and seek a new adventure.

The Howards decide to sell their house, liquidate their assets, drop out of society, "like in Easy Rider", and travel the country in a Winnebago recreational vehicle instead of hardtail Harley choppers. They leave Los Angeles with US$145,000, but their plans change drastically when Linda loses all their savings playing roulette at the Desert Inn Casino in Las Vegas, where David desperately and unsuccessfully tries to persuade a casino manager to give the money back as a publicity gimmick.

With nowhere to go, the couple quarrels at Hoover Dam. Linda hitchhikes a ride, and the driver later gives David a bloody nose. More trouble comes in form of a motorcycle cop on a Harley, accusing them of doing 83 mph on a country road. They manage to talk themselves out of the fine with reference to Easy Rider, and to the recent (1984) The Terminator film.

Eventually they arrive in small-town Safford, Arizona. David unsuccessfully applies for a delivery job at a local pharmacy and resorts to an employment agency. After a counselor tells him that there are no $100,000 high-paying jobs in the area, David accepts the best position available — as a crossing guard, taunted by local schoolchildren. Linda, meanwhile, finds employment as the assistant manager at the local Der Wienerschnitzel, working under a teenager.

Only a few days after beginning their pursuit of the dream of dropping out of society, David and Linda are living in a trailer park, nearly broke, and working dead-end jobs. They decide that it is better to return to their old lifestyle as soon as possible. They point the Winnebago toward New York, where David begs for his old job back. An end card reveals he is rehired with a substantial (31%) pay cut, but better medical benefits and that the two are now expecting their first child.

== Cast ==
- Albert Brooks as David Howard
- Julie Hagerty as Linda Howard
- Maggie Roswell as Patty
- Michael Greene as Paul Dunn
- Garry Marshall as Casino Manager
- Donald Gibb as Ex-Convict
- Charles Boswell as Highway Patrolman

Brooks originally did not want to direct himself and had wanted Bill Murray for the part of David Howard.

Albert Brooks is also heard as the voice of Hans, the Mercedes dealer on the phone. Brooks credited himself for this role as "Hans Wagner". James L. Brooks (no relation to Albert, and who had substantive roles in Brooks's previous two films) can be seen as part of the crowd at the Howards' farewell party, but has no lines.

== Reception and awards ==
Lost In America received mostly positive reviews from critics and holds a 95% rating on Rotten Tomatoes, based on 39 reviews. The site's consensus states: "A satire of the American fantasy of leaving it all behind, Lost in America features some of Albert Brooks' best, most consistent writing and cultural jabs." Metacritic, which uses a weighted average, assigned the film a score of 78 out of 100, based on 10 critics, indicating "generally favorable" reviews. The film was a commercial success, though not a blockbuster. The film's script won the National Society of Film Critics award for Best Screenplay.

Roger Ebert gave it 4 out of 4 stars, calling it observant and very funny.

The film is #80 on Bravo's 100 Funniest Movies, and was listed at #84 on American Film Institute's AFI's 100 Years...100 Laughs in 2000.

== Home media ==
Warner Home Video initially released the film on Betamax, VHS, and LaserDisc in 1985 and reissued it twice on videotape, in 1991 and 1997. The film made its DVD debut on April 3, 2001, and was made available for streaming on Netflix on July 1, 2016. The Criterion Collection selected Lost in America as their first Albert Brooks film in the collection, releasing the Blu-ray on July 25, 2017.

== See also ==
- List of films set in Las Vegas
