= 2030 (novel) =

2011 novel by Albert Brooks

- First edition cover
- Author: Albert Brooks
- Language: English
- Genre: Dystopian fiction
- Publisher: St. Martin's Press
- Publication date: May 1, 2011
- Publication place: United States
- Media type: Print (hardback)
- Pages: 375
- ISBN: 978-0-312-58372-9

2030: The Real Story of What Happens to America is a satirical near-future science-fiction novel written in 2011 by American actor and comedian Albert Brooks, his first.

== Plot ==
In the year 2030, Brad Miller has just celebrated his 80th birthday and goes to his condo in Los Angeles. The elderly have to remain careful due to recent killings of the elderly by young people. Cancer had been cured in 2015 by a man named Sam Mueller; this cure to cancer resulted in people living far longer on average. This has caused health care to be unbelievably expensive, leaving many younger people in extreme debt, which is the main cause of the attacks on the elderly. Also, Matthew Bernstein has become the first Jewish president of the United States. There is also Kathy Bernard, a woman in her 20s who lives with her father in the Midwest. Kathy’s father takes a job as a mechanic, then suffers a heart attack after coming home from work one day and passes away. This leaves Kathy in a terrible medical debt that she can't pay off, causing her boyfriend to take her to a meeting of others who are fed up with the elderly taking all of the money. There, she meets an attractive and wealthy man named Max Leonard, who she falls in love with at first sight.

Bernstein wants to hire a woman as the Secretary of Treasury, due to it being the only cabinet position that hadn't been filled by a woman. He picks a business woman named Susanna Colbert. In July 2030, there is a 9.1 level earthquake in Los Angeles that completely devastates the city, leaving all of the buildings destroyed. Brad Miller gets relocated to a giant tent where the Rose Bowl was, but all he seems to care about while he stays there is the money for his condo. Meanwhile, Kathy's father gets out of the hospital and dies later that day. She calls Max instead of Brian, causing them to break up and for her to pursue Max instead. The earthquake is so terrible that the insurance companies can't pay anyone back. Bernstein’s only option is to borrow money from China. But due to the extreme debt America is in, China doesn't believe that they will ever get paid back, so they work out an agreement to have China co-own Los Angeles and rebuild it for them.

Kathy and Max are dating while Max gets increasingly passionate about his fight against “the olds”, as he calls them. He becomes obsessed with Sam Mueller and tries to talk with some people with big influence to get his ideas out there. He talks with Walter Masters, a man who became famous for offering a drug that lets people kill themselves peacefully. Walter likes Max’s passion, but not his ideas. He also follows Mueller and his son to a hotel in Texas and gets his son to let him into his hotel room, but Mueller gets back and kicks him out. Bernstein starts to feel very attracted to Susanna and starts to have many late night talks with her. Meanwhile, Susanna gets Nate Cass, a CEO of a big healthcare company, to do a favor and take Bernstein's mother off of life support, at Bernstein's request. He asks a favor in return for Susanna to get the cops to stop investigating Cass’s brother, but she never does. Cass swears that he will make sure that Bernstein never gets elected again.

One of the main people working with Los Angeles is Shen Li, a major healthcare figure in China. He falls in love with a woman whose father has a major government position. Brad Miller finally gets the money for his condo and uses the money along with a loan from his son to go on The Sunset, a popular cruise ship retirement home. There he lives a happy life, getting a crush on a woman and befriending Walter Masters, who also joins the shop after Brad. In the middle of the night, Bernstein and his wife are sleeping when she hears him saying “I love you, Susanna” in his sleep. This causes many problems in their relationship and prompts her to realize that she never really loved him. She decides to divorce him. Bernstein and the rest of the cabinet freak out, since he would be the first president to get divorced in office; this would greatly lessen his chances to get reelected. Max’s passion towards his fight against the old becomes stronger, starting a group of like-minded people called "Enough is Enough". This also gets him on the radar of higher-ups, such as Paul Prescott, an AARP worker who started dating a man named Jack to get information on the terrorist attacks against the olds.

Kathy becomes a successful real estate agent, and as she becomes friends with her elderly boss, she realizes that not all the olds are bad. She also breaks up with Max as he becomes more agitated due to taking the drug "speed". Max then finally executes his big plan, taking hostage The Sunset. While The Sunset is docked briefly, he and other members of Enough is Enough sneak on and take control of the ship. His demand is to speak to the president and claims to have explosives on the ship, despite not really having any. Bernstein is on a plane with Susanna when he hears this, and agrees to talk with Max after he gets back to the White House. While on the plane, he kisses Susanna. They send Navy SEALS to detect bombs but don't find any, so they plan to shoot Max while on video call with the president. Max speaks to Bernstein and tells him about how the country is making life horrible for young people and demands a law to go in place to make a voting age restriction for the elderly. Max gets shot while saying this. The other members freak out and start shooting the hostages, killing Brad Miller. The call was broadcast to all the hostages, so they recorded it and uploaded it online, making the call seen by most people in the USA.

Bernstein feels conflicted, since he agrees with what Max says. Kathy gets arrested for assisting a terrorist attack, despite not knowing of Max’s plans before the attack, but her boss gets a lawyer to get her out, leaving her in even more debt than ever before. Shen Li’s father-in-law gets the idea to amend the constitution to get immigrants to be able to become president, given Li’s popularity. Nate Cass heavily donates to this cause to keep Bernstein from becoming president again. The idea gets passed and Li’s whole presidential campaign goes very well, beating Bernstein and getting elected as president.

== Development ==
According to Brooks, he "did an earlier version of the book as a script" but felt it would be too expensive to produce it as a futuristic film. The novel "is meant to be very plausible [...] I almost wanted the book to read like a news story. This is not a faraway America."

Brooks had already written "substantial portions of 2030" before pitching it to Elizabeth Beier, Brooks's editor at St. Martin's Press.

== Reception ==
The book received mostly positive reviews. Janet Maslin of The New York Times remarked that Brooks "made the nervy move of transposing his worrywart sensibility from film to book. Two things are immediately apparent about his debut novel: that it's as purposeful as it is funny, and that Mr. Brooks has immersed himself deeply in its creation." Asking why Brooks' take should be taken seriously, Maslin answers, "his prognostications are not so farfetched for futuristic fiction; that he has worked them into a real novel, not a tricked-up movie treatment; and that a little humor goes a long way in this often bleak genre". But about the ending, "some events seem abrupt and artificial", and Brooks "doesn't have the pitilessness it requires."

Kirkus Reviews summarized, "Actor Albert Brooks has fun imagining a world in the future—though not too far in the future to be wholly implausible" and "the tone is satiric, something Brooks usually does with a light touch, though occasionally he loses the playfulness and shows too heavy a hand."

Publishers Weekly called the novel a "smart and surprisingly serious debut", noted its "sweeping narrative", and classified it as "a novel as entertaining as it is thought provoking, like something from the imagination of a borscht belt H.G. Wells."
