= Albert Brooks =

American actor, comedian, director, and screenwriter (born 1947)

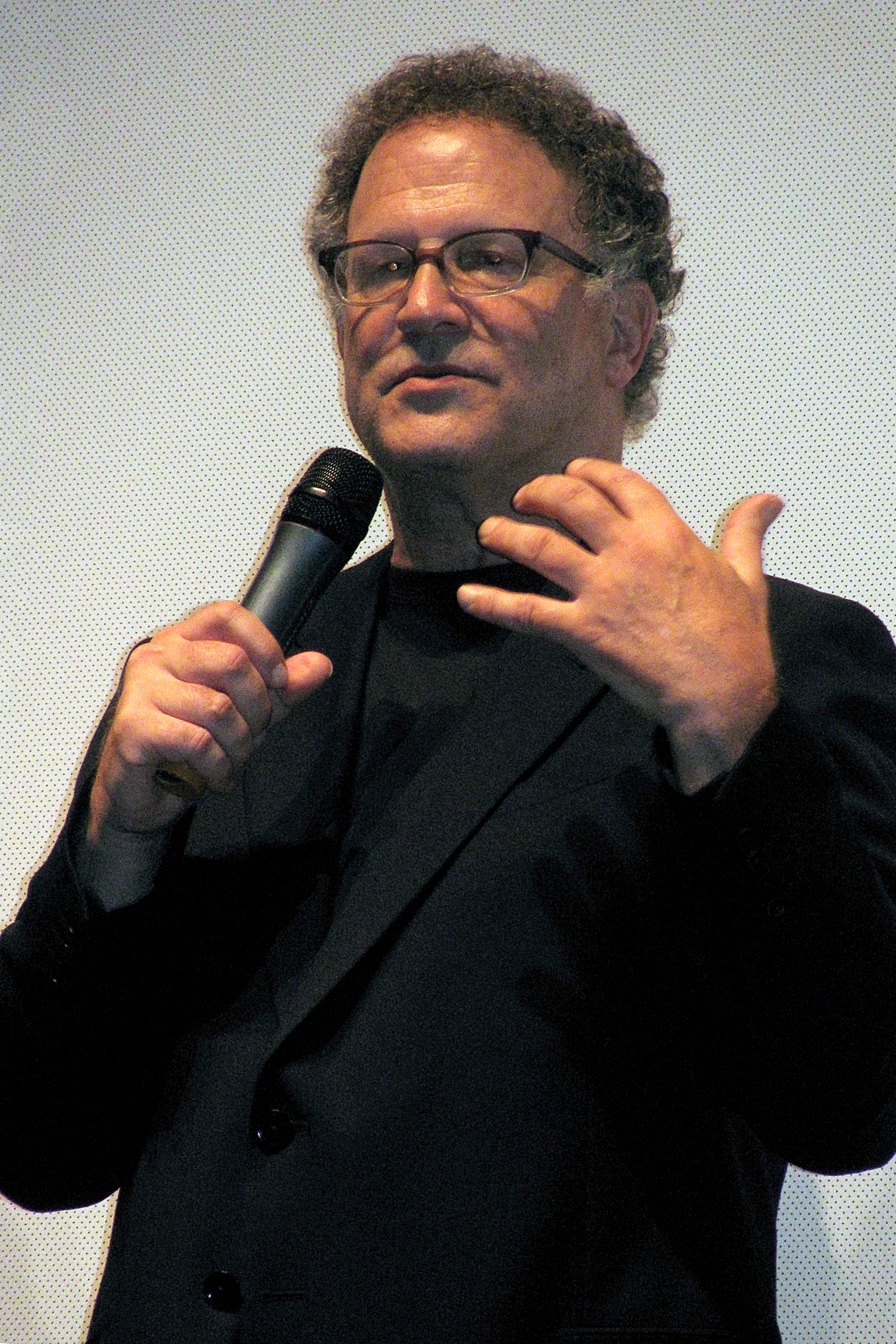
- Brooks at the Toronto International Film Festival in 2011
- Born: Albert Lawrence Einstein; July 22, 1947 (age 79); Beverly Hills, California, U.S.
- Education: Carnegie Mellon University
- Occupations: Actor; director; writer; comedian
- Years active: 1969–present
- Spouse: Kimberly Shlain (m. 1997)
- Children: 2
- Parents: Harry Einstein (father); Thelma Leeds (mother)
- Relatives: Bob Einstein (brother); Charles Einstein (half-brother)
- Website: albertbrooks.com

Albert Lawrence Einstein (born July 22, 1947), known professionally as Albert Brooks, is an American actor, comedian, director, and screenwriter. He received an Academy Award nomination for Best Supporting Actor for his performance in the comedy-drama Broadcast News (1987) and was widely praised for his performance in the action drama Drive (2011). Brooks has acted in films such as Taxi Driver (1976), Private Benjamin (1980), Unfaithfully Yours (1984), Out of Sight (1998), My First Mister (2001), and Concussion (2015). He has written, directed, and starred in a number of comedies, including Modern Romance (1981), Lost in America (1985), and Defending Your Life (1991). He is the author of 2030: The Real Story of What Happens to America (2011).

Brooks voiced several characters in animated films and television shows including Marlin in Finding Nemo (2003) and its sequel Finding Dory (2016), Tiberius in The Secret Life of Pets (2016), and several one-time characters on The Simpsons, such as Hank Scorpio in "You Only Move Twice" (1996) and Russ Cargill in The Simpsons Movie (2007).

== Early life ==
Brooks was born Albert Lawrence Einstein on July 22, 1947, into a Jewish show business family in Beverly Hills, California, to Thelma Leeds (née Goodman), an actress, and Harry Einstein, a radio comedian who performed on Eddie Cantor's radio program and was known as "Parkyakarkus". He is the youngest of three sons. His older brothers are the comedic actor Bob Einstein (1942–2019), and Clifford Einstein (b. 1939), a partner and longtime chief creative officer at Los Angeles advertising agency Dailey & Associates. His older half-brother was Charles Einstein (1926–2007), a writer for such television programs as Playhouse 90 and Lou Grant. His grandparents emigrated from Austria and Russia. He grew up among show business families in Southern California, attending Beverly Hills High School with Richard Dreyfuss and Rob Reiner.

== Career ==
Brooks attended Carnegie Institute of Technology (now Carnegie Mellon University) in Pittsburgh (where his classmates included Michael McKean and David L. Lander), but dropped out after one year to focus on his comedy career. By the age of 19, he had changed his professional name to Albert Brooks, joking that "the real Albert Einstein changed his name to sound more intelligent". He quickly became a regular on variety and talk shows during the late 1960s and early 1970s, and was on the writing staff for the ill-fated ABC show Turn-On, which was cancelled after one episode. In 1970–71, he worked with college friends McKean and Lander (alongside Harry Shearer) as a writer/guest performer on some early material by radio and LP record comedy group The Credibility Gap. Brooks led a new generation of self-reflective baby-boomer comics appearing on NBC's The Tonight Show Starring Johnny Carson. His on-stage persona, that of an egotistical, narcissistic, nervous comic, an ironic showbiz insider who punctured himself before an audience by disassembling his mastery of comedic stagecraft, influenced other post-modern comedians of the 1970s, including Steve Martin, Martin Mull, and Andy Kaufman.

After two successful comedy albums, Comedy Minus One (1973) and the Grammy Award-nominated A Star Is Bought (1975), Brooks left the stand-up circuit to try his hand as a filmmaker. He had already made his first short film, The Famous Comedians School, a satiric short and an early example of the mockumentary subgenre that was aired in 1972 on the PBS show The Great American Dream Machine.

In 1975, Brooks directed six short films for the first season of NBC's Saturday Night Live. In 1976, he appeared in his first mainstream film role, in Martin Scorsese's landmark Taxi Driver; Scorsese allowed Brooks to improvise much of his dialogue.

Brooks directorial debut was Real Life (1979), which he co-wrote with Harry Shearer and Monica Johnson. The film, in which Brooks (playing a version of himself) films a typical suburban family in an effort to win both an Oscar and a Nobel Prize, was a sendup of PBS's An American Family documentary. It has been viewed as foretelling the emergence of reality television. Brooks appeared in the film Private Benjamin (1980), starring Goldie Hawn.

Through the 1980s and 1990s, Brooks co-wrote (with long-time collaborator Monica Johnson), directed and starred in a series of well-received comedies, playing variants on his standard neurotic and self-obsessed character. These include 1981's Modern Romance, where Brooks played a film editor desperate to win back his ex-girlfriend (Kathryn Harrold). The film received a limited release and ultimately grossed under $3 million domestically. His best-received film, the satirical road movie Lost in America (1985), featured Brooks and Julie Hagerty as a couple who leave their yuppie lifestyle and drop out of society to live in a motor home as they have always dreamed of doing, meeting disappointment.

Brooks's Defending Your Life (1991) placed his lead character in the afterlife, put on trial to justify his human fears and determine his cosmic fate. Critics responded to the off-beat premise and the chemistry between Brooks and Meryl Streep, as his post-death love interest. His later efforts did not find large audiences, but still retained Brooks's touch as a filmmaker. He garnered positive reviews for Mother (1996), which starred Brooks as a middle-aged writer moving back home to resolve tensions between himself and his mother (Debbie Reynolds). 1999's The Muse featured Brooks as a Hollywood screenwriter who has "lost his edge", using the services of an authentic muse (Sharon Stone) for inspiration. In an interview with Brooks with regard to The Muse, Gavin Smith wrote, "Brooks's distinctive film making style is remarkably discreet and unemphatic; he has a light, deft touch, with a classical precision and economy, shooting and cutting his scenes in smooth, seamless successions of medium shots, with clean, high-key lighting."

Brooks has appeared as a guest voice on The Simpsons seven times (always under the name A. Brooks). He is described as the best guest star in the show's history by IGN, particularly for his role as supervillain Hank Scorpio in the episode "You Only Move Twice".

Brooks also acted in other writers' and directors' films during the 1980s and 1990s. He had a cameo in the opening scene of Twilight Zone: The Movie, playing a driver whose passenger (Dan Aykroyd) has a shocking secret. In James L. Brooks's hit Broadcast News (1987), Albert Brooks was nominated for an Academy Award for Best Supporting Actor for playing an insecure, supremely ethical television news reporter, who offers the rhetorical question, "Wouldn't this be a great world if insecurity and desperation made us more attractive?" He also won positive notices for his role in 1998's Out of Sight, playing an untrustworthy banker and ex-convict.

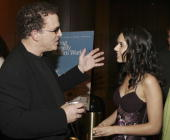
Brooks with Sheetal Sheth at the premiere of Looking for Comedy in the Muslim World in 2006

Brooks received positive reviews for his portrayal of a dying retail store owner who befriends a disillusioned teenager (played by Leelee Sobieski) in My First Mister (2001). Brooks continued his voiceover work in Pixar's Finding Nemo (2003), as the voice of Marlin, one of the film's protagonists.

His 2005 film Looking for Comedy in the Muslim World was dropped by Sony Pictures due to its desire to change the title. Warner Independent Pictures purchased the film and gave it a limited release in January 2006; the film received mixed reviews and a low box office gross. As with Real Life, Brooks plays a fictionalized "Albert Brooks", a filmmaker ostensibly commissioned by the US government to see what makes the Muslim people laugh, and sending him on a tour of India and Pakistan.

In 2006, he appeared in the documentary film Wanderlust as David Howard from Lost in America. In 2007, he continued his long-term collaboration with The Simpsons by voicing Russ Cargill, the central antagonist of The Simpsons Movie. He portrayed Lenny Botwin, Nancy Botwin's estranged father-in-law, during the 2008 season of the Showtime series Weeds.

2030: The Real Story of What Happens to America, his first novel, was published by St. Martin's Press on May 10, 2011.

Brooks co-starred as the vicious gangster Bernie Rose, the main antagonist in the 2011 film Drive, alongside Ryan Gosling and Carey Mulligan. His performance received much critical praise and positive reviews. After receiving awards and nominations from several film festivals and critic groups, but not an Academy Award nomination, Brooks responded humorously on Twitter, "And to the Academy: 'You don't like me. You really don't like me'."

Brooks voiced Tiberius, a curmudgeonly red-tailed hawk, in the 2016 film The Secret Life of Pets, and reprised the role of Marlin in Finding Dory the same year. In 2019, Brooks did not return to do the voice of Tiberius in The Secret Life of Pets 2, because he was not available.

In early November 2023, a documentary about the comedian/filmmaker, Albert Brooks: Defending My Life, directed by his friend Rob Reiner, was released on Max. The documentary includes interviews from David Letterman, Sharon Stone, Larry David, James L. Brooks, Conan O'Brien, Sarah Silverman, Ben Stiller, and others. Later that month, on the podcast WTF with Marc Maron, Brooks supplemented the biographical information in the documentary with additional stories from his life.

== Personal life ==
In 1997, Brooks married artist Kimberly Shlain, daughter of surgeon and writer Leonard Shlain. They have two children, Jacob and Claire, and live in Santa Monica, California.

== Works ==
=== As director ===
Year	Title	Distribution
1971–1972	Albert Brooks's Famous School for Comedians	PBS
1979	Real Life	Paramount Pictures
1981	Modern Romance	Columbia Pictures
1985	Lost in America	Warner Bros.
1991	Defending Your Life	Warner Bros.
1996	Mother	Paramount Pictures
1999	The Muse	October Films
2005	Looking for Comedy in the Muslim World	Warner Independent Pictures

=== Comedy albums ===
Year	Title	Type
1973	Comedy Minus One	live
1975	A Star Is Bought	studio

=== Literature ===
Year	Title
2011	2030: The Real Story of What Happens to America

== Filmography ==
=== Film ===
Year	Title	Role	Notes
1976	Taxi Driver	Tom	Film debut
1979	Real Life	Albert Brooks	Also writer
1980	Private Benjamin	Yale Goodman	
1981	Modern Romance	Robert Cole	Also writer
1983	Twilight Zone: The Movie	Car Driver	Segment: "Prologue"
1983	Terms of Endearment	Rudyard	Voice; credited as "A. Brooks"
1984	Unfaithfully Yours	Norman Robbins	
1985	Lost in America	David Howard	Also writer
1987	Broadcast News	Aaron Altman	
1991	Defending Your Life	Daniel Miller	Also writer
1994	I'll Do Anything	Burke Adler	
1994	The Scout	Al Percolo	Also writer
1996	Mother	John Henderson	Also writer
1997	Critical Care	Dr. Butz	
1998	Dr. Dolittle	Jacob "Jake" the Tiger	Voice
1998	Out of Sight	Richard Ripley	
1999	The Muse	Steven Phillips	Also writer
2001	My First Mister	Randall 'R' Harris	
2003	Finding Nemo	Marlin	Voice
2003	Exploring the Reef with Jean-Michel Cousteau	Marlin	Voice, short film
2003	The In-Laws	Jerry Peyser	
2005	Looking for Comedy in the Muslim World	Himself	Also writer
2007	The Simpsons Movie	Russ Cargill	Voice; credited as "A. Brooks"
2011	Drive	Bernie Rose	
2012	This Is 40	Larry	
2014	A Most Violent Year	Andrew Walsh	
2015	The Little Prince	The Businessman	Voice
2015	Concussion	Cyril Wecht	
2016	Finding Dory	Marlin	Voice
2016	The Secret Life of Pets	Tiberius	Voice
2017	I Love You, Daddy	Dick Welker	Voice; credited as "A. Brooks"
2021	The Super Bob Einstein Movie	Himself	Documentary
2023	Albert Brooks: Defending My Life	Himself	Documentary
2025	Ella McCay	Governor Bill	
2025	Breakdown: 1975	Himself	Documentary

=== Television ===
Year	Title	Role	Notes
1969	Hot Wheels	Mickey Barnes / Kip Chogi	Voice
1970	The Odd Couple	Rudy	2 episodes
1971	Love, American Style	Christopher Leacock	Episode 2.16: "Love and Operation Model"
1972	The New Dick Van Dyke Show	Dr. Norman	Episode 2.2: "The Needle"
1975–1976	Saturday Night Live	Interviewer / Bob / Heart Surgeon	Assistant director; Writer: 5 episodes; Actor: 4 episodes
1990–2025	The Simpsons	Hank Scorpio, Jacques, Various roles	Voice, recurring role; credited as "A. Brooks"
2008	Weeds	Lenny Botwin	4 episodes
2021	Curb Your Enthusiasm	Himself	Episode: "The Five-Foot Fence"

== Awards and nominations ==
Year	Award	Work	Result
1985	National Society of Film Critics Award for Best Screenplay	Lost in America	Won
1987	American Comedy Award for Funniest Male Supporting Actor	Broadcast News	Won
1987	Boston Society of Film Critics Award for Best Actor	Broadcast News	Won
1987	Academy Award for Best Supporting Actor	Broadcast News	Nominated
1987	National Society of Film Critics Award for Best Actor	Broadcast News	2nd place
1987	National Society of Film Critics Award for Best Supporting Actor	Broadcast News	3rd place
1996	National Society of Film Critics Award for Best Screenplay	Mother	Won
1996	New York Film Critics Circle Award for Best Screenplay	Mother	Won
2011	African American Film Critics Association Award for Best Supporting Actor	Drive	Won
2011	Austin Film Critics Association Award for Best Supporting Actor	Drive	Won
2011	Boston Society of Film Critics Award for Best Supporting Actor	Drive	Won
2011	Chicago Film Critics Association Award for Best Supporting Actor	Drive	Won
2011	Florida Film Critics Circle Award for Best Supporting Actor	Drive	Won
2011	Houston Film Critics Society Award for Best Supporting Actor	Drive	Won
2011	Las Vegas Film Critics Society Award for Best Supporting Actor	Drive	Won
2011	National Society of Film Critics Award for Best Supporting Actor	Drive	Won
2011	New York Film Critics Circle Award for Best Supporting Actor	Drive	Won
2011	New York Film Critics Online Award for Best Supporting Actor	Drive	Won
2011	Oklahoma Film Critics Circle Award for Best Supporting Actor	Drive	Won
2011	Phoenix Film Critics Society Award for Best Supporting Actor	Drive	Won
2011	San Francisco Film Critics Circle Award for Best Supporting Actor	Drive	Won
2011	Satellite Award for Best Supporting Actor – Motion Picture	Drive	Won
2011	St. Louis Gateway Film Critics Association Award for Best Supporting Actor	Drive	Won
2011	Village Voice Film Poll – Supporting Actor	Drive	Won
2011	Washington D.C. Area Film Critics Association Award for Best Supporting Actor	Drive	Won
2011	Broadcast Film Critics Association Award for Best Supporting Actor	Drive	Nominated
2011	Central Ohio Film Critics Association Award for Best Supporting Actor	Drive	runner-up
2011	Detroit Film Critics Society Award for Best Supporting Actor	Drive	Nominated
2011	Golden Globe Award for Best Supporting Actor – Motion Picture	Drive	Nominated
2011	Independent Spirit Award for Best Supporting Male	Drive	Nominated
2011	Indiana Film Critics Association Award for Best Supporting Actor	Drive	runner-up
2011	London Film Critics Circle Award for Supporting Actor of the Year	Drive	Nominated
2011	Online Film Critics Society Award for Best Supporting Actor	Drive	Nominated
2011	San Diego Film Critics Society Award for Best Supporting Actor	Drive	Nominated
2011	Southeastern Film Critics Association Award for Best Supporting Actor	Drive	runner-up
