= Mother (1996 film) =

- Theatrical release poster
- Directed by: Albert Brooks
- Written by: Albert Brooks; Monica Johnson
- Produced by: Herb Nanas; Scott Rudin
- Starring: Albert Brooks; Debbie Reynolds; Rob Morrow
- Cinematography: Lajos Koltai
- Edited by: Harvey Rosenstock
- Music by: Marc Shaiman
- Production company: Scott Rudin Productions
- Distributed by: Paramount Pictures
- Release dates: December 25, 1996 (limited); January 24, 1997; (United States)
- Running time: 104 minutes
- Country: United States
- Language: English
- Box office: $19,145,198

Mother is a 1996 American comedy-drama film directed by Albert Brooks, co-written by Brooks with Monica Johnson, and starring Brooks and Debbie Reynolds as son and mother.

Brooks portrays a novelist who moves back home with his mother after his second divorce, hoping to determine why all his relationships with women were unsuccessful. Mother was Reynolds's first major film role in over 20 years. The film earned positive reviews and was Brooks's most financially successful film as a director.

== Plot ==
Successful science fiction writer John Henderson is finalizing his second divorce. Perplexed by his issues with women, realizing that none of them supported or encouraged him, John decides to initiate an experiment that will help him understand what went wrong in his relationships: he moves back in with his widowed mother Beatrice, occupying the same bedroom he had as a child. His sports agent brother Jeff thinks John is oversensitive to their mother's criticisms, while John believes that their mother favors Jeff.

John's relationship with his mother is characterized by constant bickering and power struggles; both are perfectionists strongly committed to their respective points of view. John believes she's overly critical of him, while Beatrice contends that he unfairly blames her for his personal failings. A rare bright spot in their relationship appears when she notices John's word processor and impresses him with her fast, flawless typing. Beatrice seems surprised by his interest in her life but is reluctant to discuss it.

When Beatrice cancels her plans to visit Jeff, he has a meltdown and argues with his wife over needing to constantly contact his mother. Jeff's wife tells him that he may need to evaluate his relationship with his mother just as much as John. John and Beatrice go to the zoo, where they finally reach some common ground. When they return home, Jeff is waiting; upset by the aborted visit, he came to talk Beatrice into visiting for the weekend. All three argue and Jeff leaves alone, with John satisfied that Jeff is the "sickie" while John is "pretty darn healthy to begin with."

Beatrice tells John that she has a friend, Charles, who comes through San Francisco every few weeks and stays over a few days, but while John is there this visit will be just for one day. John is surprised that she would call someone she is intimate with not important, but she dismisses it, saying they "just have sex occasionally". John meets Charles, who knows a lot about John because, as he tells John, Beatrice brags about him when he's not around. Beatrice and Charles go to dinner; in the car they discuss the evening, with Beatrice refusing to have anything more than dinner because of her son's visit.

While alone at the house, John discovers a box of novel and short story manuscripts that his mother wrote in her youth. He learns she was a skilled writer who went to college on a scholarship, only to have her talent discouraged by her husband and the then-prevailing social expectation that mothers should not have careers outside the home. John realizes now that his mother's passive aggression toward him stems from his career reminding her of her unfulfilled ambitions and envy that her dream came true for her son. Beatrice admits that John's observation is correct, and the two warmly reconcile.

The film ends with John meeting a single female fan of his novels, and Beatrice beginning to write a story based on John's moving in with her.

== Cast ==
- Albert Brooks as John Henderson
- Debbie Reynolds as Beatrice Henderson
- Laura Weeks as Karen Henderson
- Rob Morrow as Jeff Henderson
- Isabel Glasser as Cheryl Henderson
- Danielle Quinn as Jill Henderson
- Spencer Klein as Josh Henderson
- Paul Collins as the lawyer
- John C. McGinley as Carl
- Vanessa Estelle Williams as Donna
- Lisa Kudrow as Linda
- Anne Haney as Helen
- Billye Ree Wallace as Alice
- Peter White as Charles
- James Gleason as a waiter
- Ernie Brown as the man at the rest stop
- Matt Nolan as a Gap salesman
- Harry Hutchinson as a pet store salesman
- Kimiko Gelman as a saleswoman at Victoria's Secret
- Richard Assad and Joey Naber as TV installers
- Rosalind Allen as the woman at the gas station

== Production ==
Brooks wanted a famous actress from the 1950s to play the role of Mother, and originally offered the role to retired actresses Doris Day and former first lady Nancy Reagan. Day turned down the offer; Reagan loved the script, and considered coming out of retirement for her first acting role in more than 40 years, but decided instead to stay home and care for her husband Ronald Reagan, who was suffering from Alzheimer's disease. Brooks then asked his good friend Carrie Fisher if she could send the script to her mother Debbie Reynolds, who accepted the part. Reynolds had not had a starring role since the early 1970s.

Mother was filmed on location in and around the Sausalito, Greenbrae, and Tiburon, California areas, with additional shooting in San Francisco. The exterior of Beatrice's house and street was shot in Studio City.

== Reception ==
=== Box office ===
Mother remains Brooks's highest-grossing directorial effort to date, earning $19.1 million at the box office.

=== Critical reception ===
Mother received positive reviews from critics, and holds an 87% "Fresh" rating on Rotten Tomatoes, based on 45 reviews. The site's consensus states "Albert Brooks' pugnacious insight is in fine form throughout Mother, a gentle showcase for the comedic curmudgeon and a sweetly acidic Debbie Reynolds." On Metacritic, it has a weighted average score of 76 out of 100, based on 17 reviews, indicating "generally favorable reviews". Audiences surveyed by CinemaScore gave the film a grade "B+" on scale of A to F. Roger Ebert of the Chicago Sun-Times gave Mother 3.5 stars out of a possible 4, writing that while the premise seemed like the setup for a cheap sitcom, Brooks "is much too smart to settle for the obvious gags and payoffs...the dialogue in Mother is written so carefully that some lines carry two or three nuances." The audience laughter wasn't a reaction to obvious punchlines, wrote Ebert, "but the laughter of recognition, of insight, even sometimes of squirmy discomfort, as the truths hit close to home".

=== Accolades ===
Mother has won the most awards of the films Brooks has directed. Brooks and co-writer Monica Johnson won the New York Film Critics Circle Award and the National Society of Film Critics Award for Best Screenplay. Debbie Reynolds won the Satellite Best Supporting Actress in a Motion Picture – Musical or Comedy, and was nominated for the Golden Globe Award for Best Actress – Motion Picture Musical or Comedy.
