= USA Saturday Nightmares =

American movie showcase series

- Country of origin: United States

Original release
- Network: USA Network
- Release: 1984 – 1994

USA Saturday Nightmares is an American horror and sci-fi movie showcase series that ran Saturday nights from 1984 to 1994 on the USA Network.

== Overview ==
USA Saturday Nightmares was an unhosted weekly B movie presentation, consisting of a horror or sci-fi movie, followed by an episode of The New Alfred Hitchcock Presents, The Hitchhiker, and/or The Ray Bradbury Theater. Occasionally, the show would run a short film as filler afterward, most notably "The Dummy" and "Living Dolls".

One of the show’s intros featured various scenes from black and white horror films with a creepy voice-over from Alan Kalter (of Late Show with David Letterman fame) followed by ominous laughter. Next, a bumper appears, showing scenes from the movie that would be shown along with bumpers from the episodes that would be shown after the movie. Another intro had the viewer going through a CGI haunted house where the paintings changed to depicted random acts of violence and horror film characters such as Dracula, Michael Myers, Jason Voorhees, and Freddy Krueger.
