= Damita Jo Freeman =

American dancer and actress

Damita Jo Freeman is an American dancer and actress, who started her career on the TV show Soul Train.

In 1973 Freeman became a featured dancer on Soul Train after only her second appearance on the show, when Joe Tex invited her on stage to dance to his song I Gotcha in an unchoreographed impromptu performance. Her regular dance partner was Don Campbell. Freeman's dancing on Soul Train has been described as, "One breakout star, in particular, Damita Jo Freeman, kept our eyes riveted on her every graceful move. Controlled, yet fluid, and oh so very limber, Damita Jo performed for the cameras like no other and her fuel was the outta sight music of the times."

== Acting ==
Freeman was also known for her work in film: Elvira: Mistress of the Dark (1988), The Man with One Red Shoe (1985) and Private Benjamin (1980).
