= 45th Primetime Emmy Awards =

1993 American television programming awards

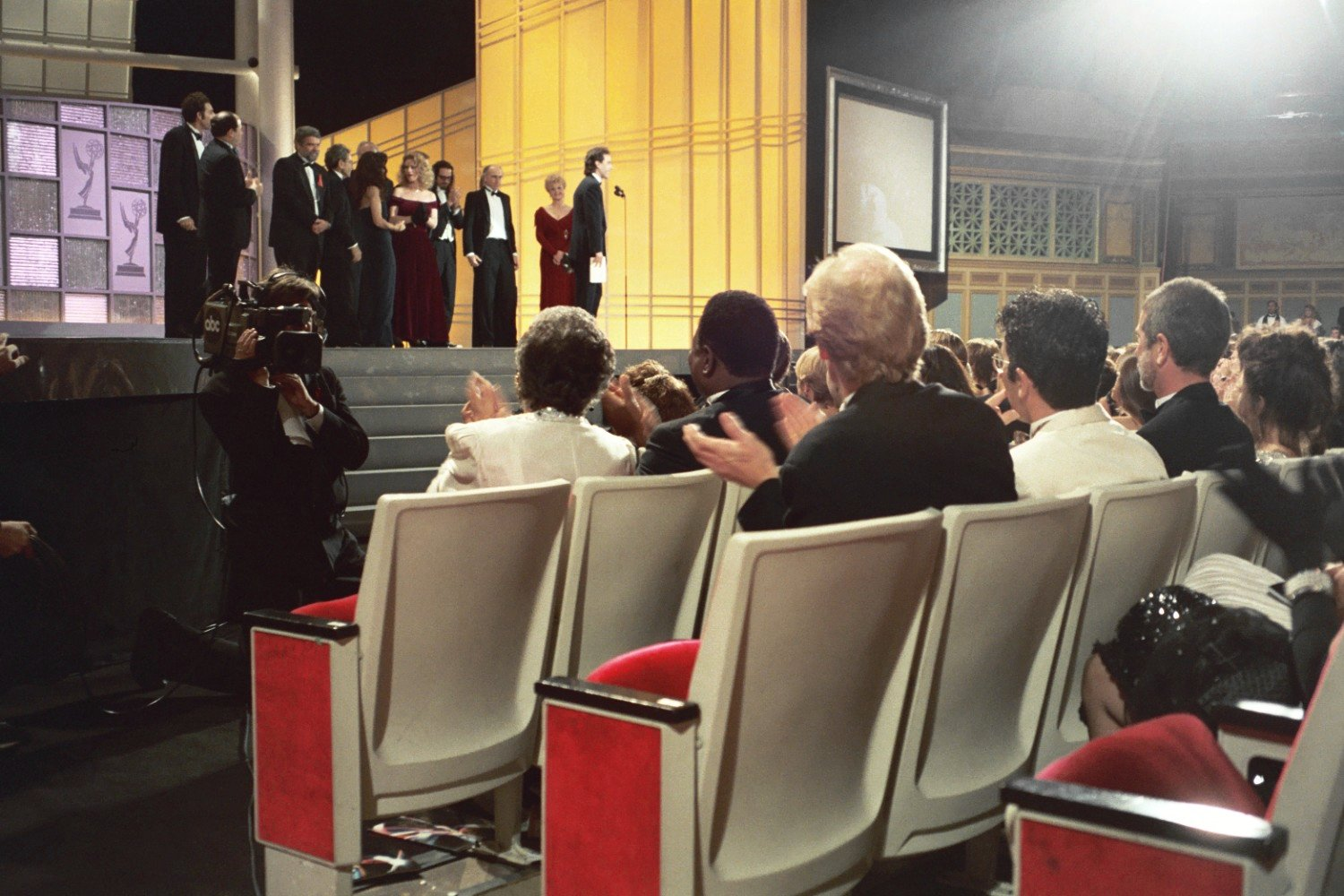
- Jerry Seinfeld speaking on behalf of the cast and crew of Seinfeld while accepting Outstanding Comedy Series
- Date: September 19, 1993 (Ceremony); September 18, 1993 (Creative Arts Awards)
- Location: Pasadena Civic Auditorium, Pasadena, California
- Presented by: Academy of Television Arts and Sciences
- Hosted by: Angela Lansbury

Highlights
- Most awards: Picket Fences; The Positively True Adventures of the Alleged Texas Cheerleader-Murdering Mom; Seinfeld (3)
- Most nominations: Northern Exposure (9)
- Outstanding Comedy Series: Seinfeld
- Outstanding Drama Series: Picket Fences
- Outstanding Miniseries: Prime Suspect II
- Outstanding Variety, Music or Comedy Series: Saturday Night Live

Television/radio coverage
- Network: ABC

The 45th Primetime Emmy Awards were held on Sunday, September 19, 1993. The ceremony was broadcast on ABC and was hosted by Angela Lansbury, presenting 27 awards. MTV received its first major nomination at this ceremony.

For its fourth season, Seinfeld won its first, and only, Primetime Emmy Award for Outstanding Comedy Series. Cheers was once again nominated for Outstanding Comedy Series. It was nominated for all eleven years that it ran and won four times. This tied the record set by M*A*S*H which also went 11/11, but only won once.

On the drama side, Northern Exposure was the defending champion and was seen heavily as the favourite coming into the ceremony being the most nominated show with nine major nominations—but in a major upset, Picket Fences took home Outstanding Drama Series. Northern Exposure set the dubious record for the largest shutout of all time, as it lost all 11 major nominations; including its Creative Arts Emmy Awards nominations, the record increases to 0/16. This record would later be tied by The Larry Sanders Show in 1997, but both of these records were later broken by Mad Men (0/17) in 2012, and again by The Handmaid's Tale (0/21) in 2021.

With David Clennon's win for Outstanding Comedy Guest Actor, this was the first time HBO won an Acting Emmy.

== Winners and nominees ==
=== Programs ===
Outstanding Comedy Series: Seinfeld (NBC); Cheers (NBC); Home Improvement (ABC); The Larry Sanders Show (HBO); Murphy Brown (CBS)	Outstanding Drama Series: Picket Fences (CBS); Homefront (ABC); I'll Fly Away (NBC); Law & Order (NBC); Northern Exposure (CBS)
Outstanding Variety, Music or Comedy Series: Saturday Night Live (NBC); Late Night with David Letterman (NBC); MTV Unplugged (MTV) (Episode: "Rod Stewart"); The Tonight Show with Jay Leno (NBC)	Outstanding Variety, Music or Comedy Special: Bob Hope: The First 90 Years (NBC); The 46th Annual Tony Awards (CBS); The 65th Annual Academy Awards (ABC); The Search for Signs of Intelligent Life in the Universe (Showtime); Sondheim: A Celebration at Carnegie Hall (PBS)
Outstanding Made for Television Movie: Barbarians at the Gate (HBO); Stalin (HBO); Citizen Cohn (HBO); The Positively True Adventures of the Alleged Texas Cheerleader-Murdering Mom (HBO); Tru (PBS)	Outstanding Miniseries: Prime Suspect II (PBS); Alex Haley's Queen (CBS); Family Pictures (ABC); The Jacksons: An American Dream (ABC); Sinatra (CBS)

=== Acting ===
==== Lead performances ====
Outstanding Lead Actor in a Comedy Series: Ted Danson as Sam Malone in Cheers (NBC) (Episode: "The Guy Can't Help It"); Tim Allen as Tim Taylor in Home Improvement (ABC) (Episode: "Where There's a Will, There's a Way"); John Goodman as Dan Conner in Roseanne (ABC) (Episode: "Terms of Estrangement", Part 2); Jerry Seinfeld as Jerry Seinfeld in Seinfeld (NBC) (Episode: "The Opera"); Garry Shandling as Larry Sanders in The Larry Sanders Show (HBO) (Episode: "What Have You Done for Me Lately?")	Outstanding Lead Actress in a Comedy Series: Roseanne Arnold as Roseanne Conner in Roseanne (ABC) (Episode: "Wait Till Your Father Gets Home"); Kirstie Alley as Rebecca Howe in Cheers (NBC) (Episode: "One for the Road"); Candice Bergen as Murphy Brown in Murphy Brown (CBS) (Episode: "Games Mothers Play"); Helen Hunt as Jamie Buchman in Mad About You (NBC) (Episode: "Pilot"); Marion Ross as Sophie Berger in Brooklyn Bridge (CBS) (Episode: "Brave New Worlds")
Outstanding Lead Actor in a Drama Series: Tom Skerritt as Jimmy Brock in Picket Fences (CBS) (Episode: "High Tidings"); Scott Bakula as Sam Beckett in Quantum Leap (NBC) (Episode: "Lee Harvey Oswald: October 5, 1957-November 22, 1963"); Michael Moriarty as Ben Stone in Law & Order (NBC) (Episode: "Night and Fog"); Rob Morrow as Joel Fleischman in Northern Exposure (CBS) (Episode: "Kaddish for Uncle Manny"); Sam Waterston as Forrest Bedford in I'll Fly Away (NBC) (Episode: "All in the Life")	Outstanding Lead Actress in a Drama Series: Kathy Baker as Jill Brock in Picket Fences (CBS) (Episode: "Thanksgiving"); Swoosie Kurtz as Alex Halsey in Sisters (NBC) (Episode: "Mirror, Mirror"); Angela Lansbury as Jessica Fletcher in Murder, She Wrote (CBS) (Episode: "Night of the Coyote"); Regina Taylor as Lilly on I'll Fly Away (NBC) (Episode: "Comfort and Joy"); Janine Turner as Maggie O'Connell in Northern Exposure (CBS) (Episode: "Love's Labour Mislaid")
Outstanding Lead Actor in a Miniseries or a Special: Robert Morse as Truman Capote in Tru (PBS); Robert Blake as John List in Judgment Day: The John List Story (CBS); Robert Duvall as Joseph Stalin in Stalin (HBO); James Garner as F. Ross Johnson in Barbarians at the Gate (HBO); James Woods as Roy Marcus Cohn in Citizen Cohn (HBO)	Outstanding Lead Actress in a Miniseries or a Special: Holly Hunter as Wanda Holloway in The Positively True Adventures of the Alleged Texas Cheerleader-Murdering Mom (HBO); Glenn Close as Sarah Witting in Skylark (CBS); Helen Mirren as DCI Jane Tennison in Prime Suspect II (PBS); Maggie Smith as Violet Venable in Suddenly, Last Summer (PBS); Joanne Woodward as Nell Harrington in Blind Spot (CBS)

==== Supporting performances ====
Outstanding Supporting Actor in a Comedy Series: Michael Richards as Cosmo Kramer in Seinfeld (NBC) (Episodes: "The Watch" + "The Junior Mint"); Jason Alexander as George Costanza in Seinfeld (NBC) (Episodes: "The Contest" + "The Outing"); Michael Jeter as Herman Stiles in Evening Shade (CBS) (Episodes: "Harlan Deals a Meal" + "The Really Odd Couple"); Jeffrey Tambor as Hank Kingsley in The Larry Sanders Show (HBO) (Episodes: "Guest Host" + "Hank's Contract"); Rip Torn as Arthur on The Larry Sanders Show (HBO) (Episodes: "The Spiders Episode" + "The New Producer")	Outstanding Supporting Actress in a Comedy Series: Laurie Metcalf as Jackie Harris in Roseanne (ABC) (Episodes: "Crime and Punishment" + "Wait Till Your Father Gets Home"); Shelley Fabares as Christine Armstrong in Coach (ABC) (Episodes: "Love Me Tender" + "Vows"); Sara Gilbert as Darlene Conner in Roseanne (ABC) (Episodes: "Good Girls, Bad Girls" + "Playing with Matches"); Julia Louis-Dreyfus as Elaine Benes in Seinfeld (NBC) (Episodes: "The Contest" + "The Airport"); Rhea Perlman as Carla Tortelli in Cheers (NBC) (Episodes: "Loathe and Marriage" + "It's Lonely on the Top")
Outstanding Supporting Actor in a Drama Series: Chad Lowe as Jesse McKenna in Life Goes On (ABC) (Episodes: "Lost Weekend" + "Bedfellows"); Barry Corbin as Maurice J. Minnifield in Northern Exposure (CBS) (Episodes: "The Big Feast" + "Sleeping with the Enemy"); John Cullum as Holling Vincoeur in Northern Exposure (CBS) (Episodes: "Learning Curve" + "Mud and Blood"); Fyvush Finkel as Douglas Wambaugh in Picket Fences (CBS) (Episodes: "Thanksgiving" + "The Body Politic"); Dean Stockwell as Al Calavicci in Quantum Leap (NBC) (Episodes: "Lee Harvey Oswald: October 5, 1957 – November 22, 1963" + "Killin' Time: June 18, 1958")	Outstanding Supporting Actress in a Drama Series: Mary Alice as Marguerite Peck in I'll Fly Away (NBC) (Episodes: "Ruler of My Heart" + "The Third Man"); Cynthia Geary as Shelly Tambo in Northern Exposure (CBS) (Episodes: "Kaddish for Uncle Manny" + "Mud and Blood"); Kay Lenz as Maggie Zombro in Reasonable Doubts (NBC) (Episodes: "Two Women" + "Wish You Were Here"); Kellie Martin as Becca Thatcher in Life Goes On (ABC) (Episodes: "Visions" + "Last Wish"); Peg Phillips as Ruth Anne in Northern Exposure (CBS) (Episodes: "Blowing Bubbles" + "Revelations")
Outstanding Supporting Actor in a Miniseries or a Special: Beau Bridges as Terry Harper in The Positively True Adventures of the Alleged Texas Cheerleader-Murdering Mom (HBO); Brian Dennehy as John McArthur in Murder in the Heartland (ABC); Jonathan Pryce as Henry Kravis in Barbarians at the Gate (HBO); Peter Riegert as Peter Cohen in Barbarians at the Gate (HBO); Maximilian Schell as Vladimir Lenin in Stalin (HBO)	Outstanding Supporting Actress in a Miniseries or a Special: Mary Tyler Moore as Georgia Tann in Stolen Babies (Lifetime); Ann-Margret as Sally Jackson in Alex Haley's Queen (CBS); Lee Grant as Dora Cohn in Citizen Cohn (HBO); Peggy McCay as Virginia Bembenek in Woman on the Run: The Lawrencia Bembenek Story (NBC); Joan Plowright as Olga in Stalin (HBO)

==== Individual performances ====
Outstanding Individual Performance in a Variety or Music Program
- Dana Carvey – Saturday Night Live (NBC)
  - Cirque du Soleil – The Tonight Show with Jay Leno (NBC)
  - Billy Crystal – The 65th Annual Academy Awards (ABC)
  - Liza Minnelli – Liza Minnelli: Live from Radio City Music Hall (PBS)
  - Lily Tomlin – The Search for Signs of Intelligent Life in the Universe (Showtime)

=== Directing ===
Outstanding Individual Achievement in Directing in a Comedy Series: Dream On (HBO): "For Peter's Sake" – Betty Thomas; Cheers (NBC): "One for the Road" – James Burrows; Dream On (HBO): "And Bimbo Was His Name-O" – Eric Laneuville; Murphy Brown (CBS): "You Say Potatoe, I Say Potato" – Peter Bonerz; Seinfeld (NBC): "The Contest" – Tom Cherones	Outstanding Individual Achievement in Directing in a Drama Series: Homicide: Life on the Street (NBC): "Gone for Goode" – Barry Levinson; I'll Fly Away (NBC): "Until Tomorrow" – Eric Laneuville; Law & Order (NBC): "Conspiracy" – Edwin Sherin; Sirens (ABC): "What We Talk About When We Talk About Love" – Robert Butler; Sisters (NBC): "Crash and Born" – Nancy Malone; The Young Indiana Jones Chronicles (ABC): "Northern Italy, 1918" – Bille August
Outstanding Individual Achievement in Directing in a Variety or Music Program: The 46th Annual Tony Awards (CBS) – Walter C. Miller; The 65th Annual Academy Awards (ABC) – Jeff Margolis; Black and Blue (PBS) – Robert Altman; Late Night with David Letterman (NBC) – Hal Gurnee	Outstanding Individual Achievement in Directing for a Miniseries or a Special: Sinatra (CBS) – James Steven Sadwith; Barbarians at the Gate (HBO) – Glenn Jordan; Citizen Cohn (HBO) – Frank Pierson; The Positively True Adventures of the Alleged Texas Cheerleader-Murdering Mom (HBO) – Michael Ritchie; A Town Torn Apart (NBC) – Daniel Petrie

=== Writing ===
Outstanding Individual Achievement in Writing in a Comedy Series: Seinfeld (NBC): "The Contest" – Larry David; Dream On (HBO): "For Peter's Sake" – David Crane and Marta Kauffman; The Larry Sanders Show (HBO): "The Hey Now Episode" – Garry Shandling and Dennis Klein; The Larry Sanders Show (HBO): "The Spider Episode" – Garry Shandling, Rosie Shuster, Paul Simms and Peter Tolan; Seinfeld (NBC): "The Outing" – Larry Charles	Outstanding Individual Achievement in Writing in a Drama Series: Homicide: Life on the Street (NBC): "Three Men and Adena" – Tom Fontana; Homefront (ABC): "The Lacemakers" – Bernard Lechowick; Law & Order (NBC): "Manhood" – Story by : Walon Green and Robert Nathan Teleplay by : Robert Nathan; Northern Exposure (CBS): "Kaddish for Uncle Manny" – Jeff Melvoin; Northern Exposure (CBS): "Midnight Sun" – Geoffrey Neigher
Outstanding Individual Achievement in Writing in a Variety or Music Program: The Ben Stiller Show (Fox); The Kids in the Hall (HBO); Late Night with David Letterman (NBC); Rick Reynolds: Only the Truth Is Funny (Showtime); Saturday Night Live (NBC)	Outstanding Individual Achievement in Writing in a Miniseries or a Special: The Positively True Adventures of the Alleged Texas Cheerleader-Murdering Mom (HBO) – Jane Anderson; Barbarians at the Gate (HBO) – Larry Gelbart; Citizen Cohn (HBO) – David Franzoni; Family Pictures (ABC) – Jennifer Miller; Stalin (HBO) – Paul Monash

== Most major nominations ==
Networks with multiple major nominations (Note: "Major" constitutes the categories listed above: Program, Acting, Directing, and Writing. Does not include the technical categories.)
Network	No. of Nominations
NBC	45
CBS	36
HBO	35
ABC	20

Programs with multiple major nominations
Program	Category	Network	No. of Nominations
Northern Exposure	Drama	CBS	9
Seinfeld	Comedy	NBC	8
Barbarians at the Gate	Movie	HBO	6
The Larry Sanders Show	Comedy	HBO	6
Cheers	Comedy	NBC	5
Citizen Cohn	Movie	HBO	5
I'll Fly Away	Drama	NBC	5
The Positively True Adventures of the Alleged Texas Cheerleader-Murdering Mom	Movie	HBO	5
Stalin	Movie	HBO	5
Law & Order	Drama	NBC	4
Picket Fences	Drama	CBS	4
Roseanne	Comedy	ABC	4
The 65th Annual Academy Awards	Variety	ABC	3
Dream On	Comedy	HBO	3
Late Night with David Letterman	Variety	NBC	3
Murphy Brown	Comedy	CBS	3
Saturday Night Live	Variety	NBC	3
The 46th Annual Tony Awards	Variety	CBS	2
Alex Haley's Queen	Miniseries	CBS	2
Family Pictures	Miniseries	ABC	2
Home Improvement	Comedy	ABC	2
Homefront	Drama	ABC	2
Homicide: Life on the Street	Drama	NBC	2
Life Goes On	Drama	ABC	2
Prime Suspect II	Miniseries	PBS	2
Quantum Leap	Drama	NBC	2
The Search for Signs of Intelligent Life in the Universe	Variety	Showtime	2
Sinatra	Miniseries	CBS	2
Sisters	Drama	NBC	2
The Tonight Show with Jay Leno	Variety	NBC	2
Tru	Movie	PBS	2

== Most major awards ==
Networks with multiple major awards
Network	No. of Awards
NBC	10
HBO	6
CBS	5
ABC	3
PBS	2

Programs with multiple major awards
Programs	Category	Network	No. of Awards
Picket Fences	Drama	CBS	3
The Positively True Adventures of the Alleged Texas Cheerleader-Murdering Mom	Movie	HBO	3
Seinfeld	Comedy	NBC	3
Homicide: Life on the Street	Drama	NBC	2
Roseanne	Comedy	ABC	2
Saturday Night Live	Variety	NBC	2
