= The Tape =

- Seinfeld episode
- Episode no.: Season 3 Episode 8
- Directed by: David Steinberg
- Written by: Larry David; Bob Shaw; Don McEnery
- Production code: 308
- Original air date: November 13, 1991

Guest appearances
- John Apicella as Repairman; Ping Wu as Ping; Norman Brenner as Beder

Episode chronology
← Previous "The Cafe"	Next → "The Nose Job"
- Seinfeld season 3

"The Tape" is the eighth episode of the third season of the American television sitcom Seinfeld (and the 25th episode overall). It first aired on NBC in the United States on November 13, 1991. The episode was written by Larry David, Don McEnery and Bob Shaw, and directed by David Steinberg. In this episode, Elaine leaves an erotic message on a tape recorder as a prank, inadvertently causing George to harbor a secret crush on her.

== Plot ==
After testing new material in his comedy act, Jerry plays back a tape recording to gauge audience reception. Partway through, he is surprised and titillated by an unidentified woman's voice sexually propositioning into the tape recorder. George and Kramer are likewise aroused. Elaine confides to George that she recorded the mystery voice as a prank, leading Jerry to believe that someone in the audience was lusting after him. George is uncontrollably sexually excited by his secret knowledge of Elaine's lascivious side.

Kramer gets a free camcorder, and indulges in filming everyone. He pretends to interview Elaine as a porn star; playfully improvising, she jokes about her and George as co-stars in a porn film. The tease of actual sex with Elaine haunts George as he drives her home, but he fails to proposition to her.

Seeing a Chinese doctor's claimed baldness cure on CNN, George tries to order the cure by phoning China long-distance. He first fails to account for the time zone difference, then the sellers not speaking English. A Chinese delivery boy arrives and George enlists him as interpreter, successfully buying the cure—a foul-smelling, thick topical cream. George is torn between putting the cream on for his own sake and taking it off for Elaine's, and finally covers it with a cowboy hat.

Kramer schemes to reclaim the jacket he relinquished last episode to his mother's ex-boyfriend, who is now in jail.

Jerry identifies and asks out a woman who sat near the tape recorder, and is confused by her reluctance to be intimate. Elaine confesses before the prank goes too far, but not before George tells all to Jerry out of sexual frustration. Kramer overhears while scrutinizing George's hair growth on video. With not just George but all three men turned on by the revelation, Elaine apprehensively leaves. The men fight over the tape recorder.

== Production ==
This episode is the first appearance of Ping, the delivery boy who would return in the later episodes "The Visa", "The Virgin" and "The Pilot".

== Use in scientific research ==
The Simpsons "Bart the General" and Seinfeld's "The Tape" were used in a Dartmouth College experiment to study brain activity in relation to humorous moments in television shows. The results were published in a 2004 issue of the academic journal Neurolmage. The researchers noted, "During moments of humor detection, significant [brain] activation was noted in the left posterior middle temporal gyrus ... and left inferior frontal gyrus."
