= The Contest =

- Seinfeld episode
- Episode no.: Season 4 Episode 11
- Directed by: Tom Cherones
- Written by: Larry David
- Production code: 411
- Original air date: November 18, 1992

Guest appearances
- Jane Leeves as Marla; Ilana Levine as Joyce; Rachel Sweet as Shelly; Andrea Parker as a nurse; Estelle Harris as Estelle Costanza

Episode chronology
← Previous "The Virgin"	Next → "The Airport"
- Seinfeld season 4

"The Contest" is the eleventh episode of the fourth season of the American television sitcom Seinfeld, and the 51st episode overall. Written by Larry David and directed by Tom Cherones, the episode originally aired on NBC on November 18, 1992. In the episode, Jerry, George, Elaine, and Kramer hold a contest to determine who can go for the longest time without masturbating.

As NBC executives felt that masturbation was not a topic suitable for prime time television, the word masturbation is never used in the episode, instead replaced by a number of comic euphemisms.

The term "master of my domain", describing someone who has resisted the urge to masturbate, has since become a popular catchphrase.

David won a Primetime Emmy Award for Outstanding Writing in a Comedy Series for the episode. In 2009, "The Contest" was ranked number 1 on TV Guide's list of the "100 Greatest Episodes of All-Time".

== Plot ==
George, in low spirits, confesses to Jerry, Elaine, and Kramer that his mother found him masturbating to her issue of Glamour. With his mother hospitalized after throwing out her back in horror, George swears off masturbation "altogether", to everyone's incredulity. George challenges Jerry to a wager to hold out the longest; the others ante up as well, but, giving women "two to one" odds over men, they make Elaine put up extra.

Through Jerry's window, a naked woman can be seen in an apartment across the street. As George and Jerry peep transfixed, Kramer discreetly exits, then returns, declaring "I'm out!" and pays up. George's mother, in traction at the hospital, harangues him and demands that he see a psychiatrist for what he did. When George's cousin Shelly starts asking him about his writing job for NBC, he becomes titillated by the silhouette of a female patient receiving a sponge bath by a nurse behind the divider curtain.

Elaine starts an aerobics class, where, as an unexpected bonus, John F. Kennedy Jr. is also working out. Starstruck, Elaine pretends to live at Jerry's building just to share a taxi with Kennedy. Jerry is sexually frustrated by Marla's hesitancy to lose her virginity to him. That night, Kramer sleeps soundly while the others sleeplessly hold out.

Jerry is desperate to shut out the naked woman, but Kramer is equally desperate to continue peeping, and Jerry resorts to distracting himself with cartoons on TV. George feigns filial devotion to visit his mother again during sponge bath hours, but plays for time as she begs him to get her a sandwich. Kennedy has asked to meet Elaine again at Jerry's building, enrapturing her. That night, she gives in to her fantasies.

Elaine pays up while Jerry and George, after two restless nights, snap at each other over a pair of socks. Later, Marla is finally ready for sex, and Jerry relievedly comes clean about the contest. Marla denounces the entire group and leaves in horror. Elaine misses Kennedy's arrival, and he finds the distraught Marla instead, consoling and leaving with her.

Despite dropping out first, Kramer has come out on top by hooking up with the naked woman, as the others look on enviously. That night, everyone sleeps soundly, the contest now moot. Meanwhile, Marla has blissfully lost her virginity to Kennedy.

== Production ==
"The Contest" was written by Seinfeld co-creator Larry David. According to Kenny Kramer, David really did make such a wager with friends, winning by holding out for three weeks, while Kramer sat out because he thought he could not win. David had pitched script ideas to Jerry Seinfeld many times while passing over this particular one, believing it would be rejected. However, when he finally offered the idea, Seinfeld had no objections.

The original script was not revealed until the night before the cast read-through. The first version written by David was not as clean as the one later broadcast. The note from the censor claimed that David should not use the word masturbate. Seinfeld decided it would be better to remove any references to what George actually did. Seinfeld claimed that what was noteworthy about "The Contest" was the "dovetailing" of the stories. He claimed that it probably would have been possible to have used the word masturbation in the episode (in "The Ticket"—an earlier episode in the same season—George says "you must have a good story; otherwise, it's just masturbation") but that this would not have been as humorous. Part of the opening scene was originally written for "The Seinfeld Chronicles", the series' pilot episode.

"The Contest" is the first episode to feature Estelle Costanza, George's mother, as an on-screen character. Estelle Harris, who played the character, had not seen Seinfeld before she auditioned; her son told her about the audition. The cast and crew commented positively on the similarity in appearance between Harris and Jason Alexander, as it made it more believable that their characters could be related. Rachel Sweet has a cameo role in this episode as George's cousin Shelly.

In a deleted scene, before George arrives at Monk's in the opening, Joyce, Elaine's friend, invites her to aerobics, but Elaine does not offer Joyce a seat after an awkward silence. In a second deleted scene, George brings a sandwich as an excuse to visit his mother once more, but the sponge-bathing patient has been moved out due to Estelle's complaints.

== Reception ==
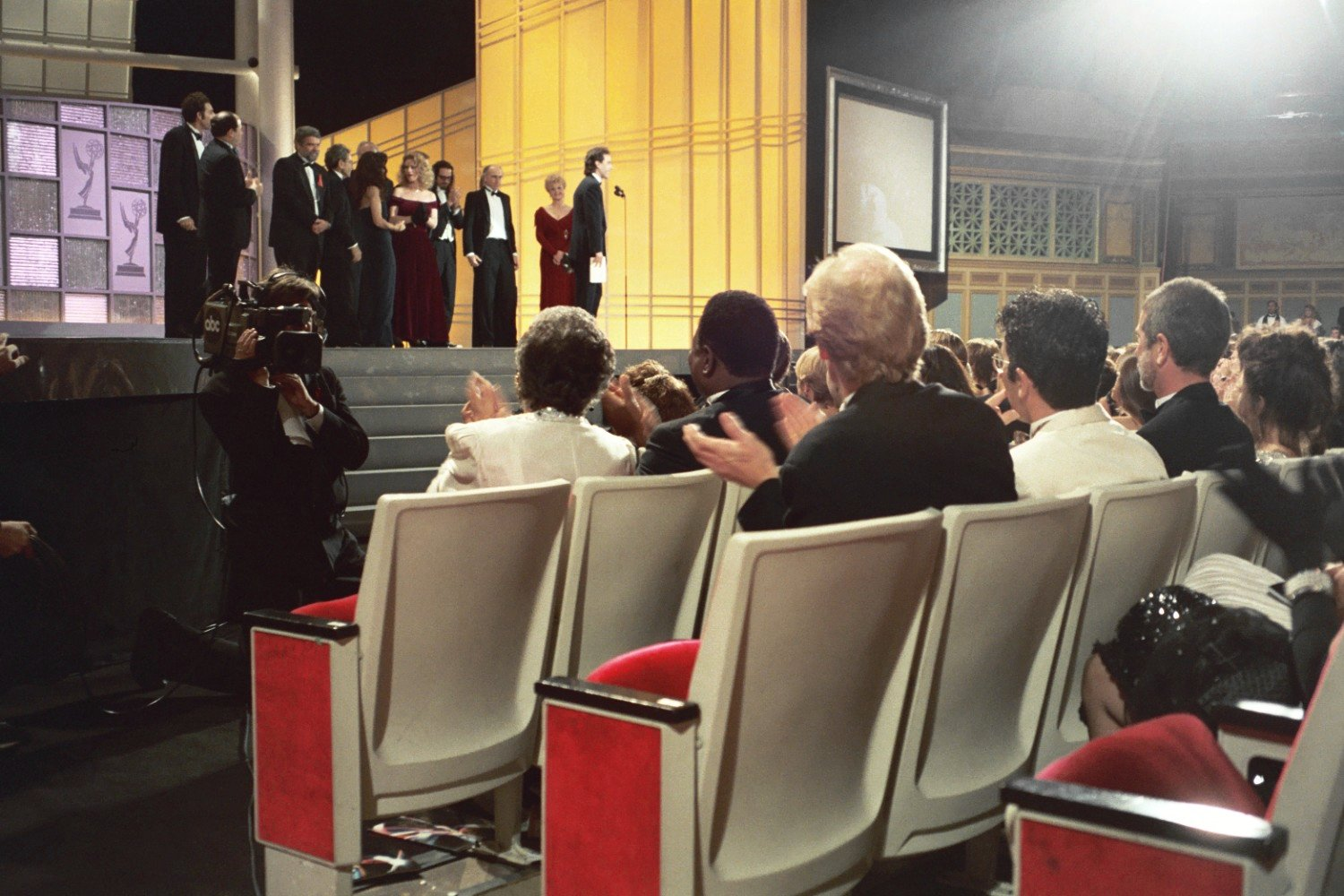
Seinfeld cast on stage during the 1993 Emmy Awards.

"The Contest" received critical acclaim and is considered one of the best Seinfeld episodes, winning several awards and positive reviews from critics. David won a Primetime Emmy Award for Outstanding Writing in a Comedy Series for the episode. He also won a Writers Guild of America Award for his work on the episode. Director Tom Cherones won a Directors Guild of America Award for Outstanding Directorial Achievement in Comedy Series for this episode. He was also nominated for a Primetime Emmy Award for Outstanding Directing for a Comedy Series. TV Guide ranked the episode #1 on its list of "TV's Top 100 Episodes of All Time".

"The Contest" received a Nielsen rating of 13/19, meaning that the episode was watched by an average of 13% of households and 19% of all televisions were tuned to the episode when it was broadcast. Approximately 18.5 million people watched the episode then. The first repeat of the episode gave Seinfeld its highest ratings up until that point, with a 20.1/30 Nielsen Rating. It also received only 31 complaints from viewers, despite the subject matter. There were worries from sponsors who did not want to advertise during the episode due to the topics that were being discussed. Most regular advertisers did not broadcast during the show, because the series did not have good ratings at the time.

The episode is considered by most reviewers as a success for being able to cover a controversial subject in an inoffensive manner. Jonathan Boudreaux for tvdvdreviews.com said: "The Emmy-winning script by Larry David introduced the brilliant euphemism 'master of my domain' to our lexicon and helped the series to truly become must-see TV. We know what the episode is about, but the script never explicitly says it. "The Contest" effortlessly takes a potentially incendiary subject and renders it utterly inoffensive yet hilarious." He also said that "The Contest" was "one of the series' most infamous" episodes. Donna Dorsett from audaud.com commented on the refusal to use the word "masturbation," saying: "If the word had been used, even once, the show would not have been nearly as hilarious. The episode was totally inoffensive."

James Plath from DVD Town said: "Estelle Harris, as George's mother, is hilarious."

== Cultural references ==
This is the second Seinfeld episode to feature Elaine's fondness for the Kennedy family, the first being "The Baby Shower".

The original script featured Jerry watching the TV series Flipper. It was changed to Tiny Toon Adventures due to concerns over music rights. The episode of Tiny Toons that Jerry was watching included the song "The Wheels on the Bus". However, Tiny Toons never used that song in any actual episode. The joke was under the assumption that the show was aimed at preschoolers, but in reality it is not. Seinfeld himself claimed that he had never heard of the song "The Wheels on the Bus" before recording the episode.

== References in other works ==
"The Contest" is referenced in other Seinfeld episodes, the first being "The Outing", in which Jerry and George are mistakenly outed as gay. During the episode, when George visits his mother, there is a male patient in the hospital, who receives daily sponge baths from a male nurse. Although the winner of the contest is not mentioned, it is implied in "The Puffy Shirt" that George was the winner. However, as the plane is going down in "The Finale", George says he cheated, and Jerry declares himself the true winner. When Jerry asks why he cheated, George simply replies, "Because I'm a cheater!"

In the "Shaq" episode of Curb Your Enthusiasm, Larry David and Shaquille O'Neal watch "The Contest" together. O'Neal referred to this episode of Seinfeld as his favorite.

"The Contest" is referenced in the Beavis and Butt-Head book This Book Sucks as an excuse to get out of finishing a homework assignment.

In the Family Guy episode "Jungle Love", Peter pays the people of a South American village to re-enact "The Contest" as one of them hums the Seinfeld scene-changing music. A shaman plays Elaine, but she says "You can't spare one square?", in reference to "The Stall".

In the It's Always Sunny in Philadelphia episode "The Gang Does a Clip Show", the gang misremembers this episode as one of their schemes with Dennis and Mac both playing Jerry, Frank playing George, Charlie playing Kramer and Dee playing Elaine, in the scene where Kramer announces he's out.

In the Mystery Science Theater 3000 episode riffing on The Beast of Hollow Mountain, Crow delivers a short summary of the episode. The following episode would feature a cameo appearance by Seinfeld.

"The Contest" was the main source of inspiration for Netflix's 2020 reality television dating show Too Hot to Handle, in which formerly promiscuous contestants are forced to abstain from sexual practices including masturbation as they try to form meaningful relationships with each other.

The season 5 premiere of Big Mouth, titled "No Nut November", directly parodies the episode. The main characters agree to abstain from masturbation in an animated version of Monk's Café.

== See also ==
- List of television episodes listed among the best
