= The Handicap Spot =

- Seinfeld episode
- Episode no.: Season 4 Episode 22
- Directed by: Tom Cherones
- Written by: Larry David
- Production code: 420
- Original air date: May 13, 1993

Guest appearances
- Estelle Harris as Estelle Costanza; John Randolph (original version) and Jerry Stiller (syndicated version) as Frank Costanza; Richard Portnow as Ray; Rick Overton as The Drake; Nancy Lenehan as Volunteer; Elizabeth Dennehy as Allison; Kathy Kinney as Bystander; Donna Evans Merlo as Lola

Episode chronology
| ← Previous "The Smelly Car" | Next → "The Pilot" |
- Seinfeld season 4

"The Handicap Spot" is the 22nd episode of the fourth season and the 62nd overall episode of Seinfeld. It aired on May 13, 1993 on NBC. In this episode, George parks his father's car illegally in a handicap spot while the group gets a big-screen TV for their friend "the Drake"'s engagement.

== Plot ==
Everyone is going to mutual friend Scott Drake's engagement party, all concurring that they "love the Drake"—except George, who chafes at never-ending gift obligations. They all pool money and go to a mall in Lynbrook for an extravagant gift. Jerry wants to take a good car, and, with Kramer's car not running, gets George to borrow his father Frank's car.

Finding no convenient parking, George is persuaded by Kramer to illegally park in a handicap spot over Elaine's objections. They get a bargain on a big-screen TV delivered directly to the party, but cannot leave the mall since an angry mob has gathered around the car. The mob wants vengeance because, with the handicap spot occupied, a wheelchair-using woman had an accident detouring on a ramp, and was hospitalized. Slipping away, the group wash their hands of the blame and plan a distraction, but find too late that the mob has totaled the car.

With the car a total loss under his father's insurance, George makes up malicious motorists as a scapegoat. Estelle's mahjong group is amused by the similarity to George's NBC pilot script.

Kramer falls in love with Lola, the disabled woman, and ropes George into chipping in to replace her wheelchair. George chafes again. After turning down a state-of-the-art model, they settle for a cheap, used wheelchair which Kramer tests, crashing repeatedly.

Having missed the party, Jerry and Elaine visit "the Drake" and his fiancée, Allison. They admire the new TV, but learn the couple broke up only minutes before. Everyone's hopes to get the TV back are dashed when the Drake gives Allison all the engagement gifts, and she in turn donates them all to charity. They all concur that they "hate the Drake".

Frank is honored for his fundraising to buy wheelchairs for charity, but gets arrested for parking in a handicap spot in front of his fellow charity volunteers, and realizes what George did. George becomes Frank's butler to work off the damages and fines, just like in the pilot script. Lola condescendingly dumps Kramer, but keeps the wheelchair.

Lola has another accident when the defective wheelchair brakes send her on a downhill plunge. Frank sends George to pick up Allison's donated TV for Lola, but George and Kramer haul it back to the mall for a refund. Back in the parking lot, Kramer suggests George park illegally next to a fire hydrant.

== Production ==
This is the first appearance of George's father Frank Costanza, played by John Randolph. After this episode, Randolph was replaced with Jerry Stiller, who would play Frank for the rest of the series. In 1995, the scenes in which Randolph appeared were re-shot with Stiller for the series' syndication in the United States. However, in some syndicated airings, Randolph is still listed in the credits.
