= The Visa =

- Seinfeld episode
- Episode no.: Season 4 Episode 15
- Directed by: Tom Cherones
- Written by: Peter Mehlman
- Production code: 414
- Original air date: January 27, 1993

Guest appearances
- Brian George as Babu; John Hamelin as Babu's brother; Gerry Bednob as Babu's friend; Maggie Han as Cheryl; Ping Wu as Ping

Episode chronology
← Previous "The Movie"	Next → "The Shoes"
- Seinfeld season 4

"The Visa" is the 55th episode of the sitcom Seinfeld. It is the 15th episode of the fourth season. It aired on January 27, 1993 on NBC. In this episode, Jerry is forced to stop being funny in front of George's girlfriend Cheryl, while seeking her legal help to stop Babu Bhatt's deportation.

== Plot ==
George hits it off with Cheryl, a lawyer who laughs easily at his jokes. He regrets showing her his best, assuming there is nowhere to go but down. Jerry has set up Babu Bhatt with a job at Monk's and an apartment in his building, making up for his earlier advice that drove Babu out of business, and Babu once again showers Jerry with praise. Meanwhile, Elaine has picked up Jerry's mail while he was on tour—standing in for Kramer, who is away at fantasy baseball camp playing with retired Major League players. Elaine puts off bringing the mail despite Jerry's impatience.

George does not want to join Jerry and Elaine's dinner plans, vividly imagining that Jerry would have Cheryl in hysterics. He takes Cheryl to a restaurant that Jerry has vetoed, but this backfires when Elaine changes Jerry's mind. They all meet, and everyone but George cracks up at the coincidence that Ping the delivery boy is Cheryl's cousin, and that Cheryl is representing Ping in his lawsuit against Elaine. Feeling upstaged, George demands behind Cheryl's back that Jerry stop being funny, but Elaine has no faith that he can do so. To prove himself, Jerry turns crushingly gloomy and existential.

Kramer returns, having singlehandedly sabotaged baseball camp. He recounts plunking Joe Pepitone, who, charging the mound, provoked a bench-clearing brawl in which Kramer knocked out Mickey Mantle.

Babu is arrested by INS for overstaying his visa, and Jerry swears to help him. However, he finds Babu's visa renewal form mixed up in his own mail, which Elaine has finally brought. Jerry and Elaine blame each other.

Jerry seeks Cheryl's help because she practices immigration law, and George insists that Jerry continue his act to Cheryl, until "consummation". Fortunately, not only does Cheryl have an immigration official friend, but she has also dropped Ping's case out of camaraderie. Jerry and Elaine come clean to Babu in detention, enraging him since he would have picked up Jerry's mail if asked. Jerry reassures him that "the wheels are in motion" thanks to Cheryl.

Sympathizing for Jerry's total despondency, Cheryl becomes attracted to him. Upstaged again, George insists he is far more disturbed than Jerry, revealing their deception as proof. Cheryl loses all sympathy for the group, abandoning Babu's case and filing Ping's lawsuit anew for double damages. Jerry, Elaine, and George all blame each other when Babu is deported back to Pakistan. At Mickey Mantle's restaurant, Kramer remorsefully begs Mantle to punch him back, but gets thrown out.

In Pakistan, Babu vows to return to America to take vengeance on Jerry.
