= The Smelly Car =

- Seinfeld episode
- Episode no.: Season 4 Episode 21
- Directed by: Tom Cherones
- Written by: Larry David and Peter Mehlman
- Production code: 422
- Original air date: April 15, 1993

Guest appearances
- Heidi Swedberg as Susan; Michael Des Barres as Restaurateur; Nick Bakay as Carl; Kari Coleman as Allison; Taylor Negron as Hairdresser; Courtney Gains as Clerk; Raf Mauro as Car Washer; Viveka Davis as Mona; Grant Heslov as Car Thief

Episode chronology
← Previous "The Junior Mint"	Next → "The Handicap Spot"
- Seinfeld season 4

"The Smelly Car" is the 61st episode of the sitcom Seinfeld, and the 21st episode of the fourth season. It aired on April 15, 1993 on NBC. In this episode, Jerry gets his car back from a valet, only to find that an all-pervading stench has taken root inside. George reconnects with Susan, who has become a lesbian after breaking up with him.

== Plot ==
Elaine is impatient to meet up with her boyfriend Carl as she and Jerry wait for a restaurant valet to return Jerry's car. Driving off, they get inundated by powerful body odor left in the car. Even after they ride with the windows down, Carl, in an amorous embrace with Elaine, is abruptly repelled by the lingering stench.

At a video rental shop, George is excited to spot a lesbian couple, but is caught off-guard to find that one of them is Susan. George fails to hide his stupefaction, and learns that Susan started dating the other woman, Mona, after breaking up with him. Neither of them notices Mona taking an interest as Kramer practices his golf swing with a broom. George reluctantly reveals that he is returning the erotic film Rochelle, Rochelle, and is fined $2 for failing to rewind. Kramer reminds him that keeping the video another day to rewind will cost less.

Jerry, finding his car even smellier the next day, learns that car detailing will cost $250. Elaine is perplexed that Carl decided to turn in early, and Jerry confirms that no man would pass up sex to "get up early". Kramer clues in Jerry and Elaine that the stench is clinging to them both.

George, riding with Jerry, realizes he is more attracted to Susan as a lesbian. Back at the restaurant, after they shoo away the valet, Jerry demands that the maître d' pay for his cleaning. They badger the maître d' into smelling the car, then trap him inside until he desperately relents to splitting the cost. George finds that someone stole his video out of the car.

George, believing that Susan becoming a lesbian was about him, meets her again at the rental shop. Susan does not dignify his idea with a response, but, when he gets slapped with a $98 penalty for the lost video, she lends him money despite knowing she won't see it back. Meanwhile, Mona meets with Kramer in a passionate embrace.

Jerry subjects his car to an elaborate and thorough cleaning, while Elaine subjects her hair to the same at a salon, but the smell endures despite these labors. Susan hounds Kramer for stealing away Mona, the latest in the parade of indignities he has inflicted upon her. Everyone else is baffled at Kramer winning the heart of a lifelong lesbian. Kramer, who has gotten professional golf instruction from Mona to boot, borrows Jerry's jacket for a date. Catching Susan on the rebound, George is on the verge of winning her back when his ex-girlfriend Allison spots him. George is shut out again when Susan and Allison fall for each other.

Jerry gives up against the all-powerful odor, but a used car dealer writes the smelly car off as unsellable. The smell has also percolated into Jerry's jacket, driving Mona to leave Kramer. Back at the salon, Elaine requests their "last resort" hair treatment of tomato sauce. Jerry abandons the car on the street, and the smell disgusts a potential car thief as he sits behind the wheel.

== Production ==
Co-writer Peter Mehlman got the idea for the episode from the real-life experiences of a friend of his. According to Mehlman, the friend would frequently pitch him ideas for episodes, none of which were even close to being good enough to use, but on this occasion the friend was simply complaining about the ordeal, at which point Mehlman immediately decided that it would be perfect for the show.

Amy McWilliams remarks that this is an example of many episodes that are "open-ended": it lacks "a traditional resolution completely, as the viewer is simply left with a final comic shot of a street hoodlum wrinkling his nose as he tries to steal 'The Smelly Car'."

== Critical response ==
Variety's contemporary review praised Larry David and Peter Mehlman's "witty script", highlighting George's storyline as taking numerous turns and "being filled with amusing detail."
