= The Movie (Seinfeld) =

- Seinfeld episode
- Episode no.: Season 4 Episode 14
- Directed by: Tom Cherones
- Written by: Steve Skrovan; Bill Masters; Jon Hayman
- Production code: 415
- Original air date: January 6, 1993

Guest appearances
- Barry Diamond as Pat Buckles; Perry Anzilotti as Usher; Tom La Grua as Kernis; Eric Poppick as Maurice; Cathy Lind Hayes as Woman behind Elaine

Episode chronology
← Previous "The Pick"	Next → "The Visa"
- Seinfeld season 4

"The Movie" is the fourteenth episode of the fourth season of the American television sitcom Seinfeld (and the 54th episode overall). It first aired on NBC in the United States on January 6, 1993. In this episode, the characters repeatedly miss each other at one movie theater, then another.

== Plot ==
In one night, Jerry is booked at two different comedy clubs, then going to seeing the movie CheckMate with his friends. Confused scheduling makes him needlessly miss one of his sets, postpone the other, and give up the movie, but he must go drop out of the movie in person, then return to the club. Pat Buckles, a small-time comedian who loiters at clubs to fill in for no-shows, shares a taxi to rub elbows with Jerry. The ride is prolonged when Buckles gets them stuck in traffic, and fails to take a hint at Jerry's impatience for his life story, jokes, and personal requests.

At the Paragon, George mistakenly waits in the ticket holders' line to buy tickets. When Elaine and Kramer arrive, the movie is sold out. Everyone agrees to go to the next showing at the Paradise Twin instead, despite Elaine's disappointment at going to a two-screen theater instead of single-screen. They leave Kramer behind to wait for Jerry.

George buys everyone's tickets. Elaine only has a twenty to pay him back, and he tries to get it from her despite not having change. Elaine reluctantly saves everyone's seats while George leaves to find Kramer and Jerry. Overcoming her trauma from a "seat-saving incident" that tore her coat, Elaine fends off an onslaught of seat-seekers on all sides, but finally gives up and yields the seats.

Having skipped dinner, Kramer gives in to his craving for a hot dog at Papaya King across the street, causing both George and Jerry to miss him. Before leaving, Jerry is tantalized by a trailer for Rochelle, Rochelle, an erotic film with a young female lead. Having sent Buckles and the taxi away, Jerry suffers more delays getting another taxi back.

After bickering with a woman for talking loudly through the trailers, Elaine steps out to buy concessions, but becomes baffled by drink and popcorn sizes. George re-enters the theater twice, failing to find Elaine; since he keeps misplacing his ticket stubs, an unsympathetic ticket taker collects his extra tickets. George sees Rochelle instead, while the same ticket taker waves Kramer through with no ticket at all. The loud talker gives Elaine's seat to Kramer, and his hot dog drips mustard onto Elaine's coat. With no seats left, Elaine is forced to see Rochelle as well.

Buckles fills in at the club for the late-arriving Jerry, scoring a hit with the audience. Buckles invites Jerry to Rochelle as consolation for his wasted night. They end up at the same showing as George and Elaine; with Jerry and Elaine underwhelmed and a tall man blocking George's view, they all bail early. Kramer, wearing Elaine's soiled coat, finds them. George asks Jerry and Kramer to repay him, but they only have twenties.

== Production ==
A deleted scene shows Buckles performing his stand-up jokes in Jerry's place, doing impressions of many historical figures being stuck in traffic.

== Continuity ==
The fictional film Rochelle, Rochelle ("a young girl's strange, erotic journey from Milan to Minsk") is first mentioned in this episode. George rents it from a video store in Season 4's "The Smelly Car", and it is turned into a Broadway musical starring Bette Midler in Season 6's "The Understudy". The phrase "from Milan to Minsk" is also used in the episode "Igor, Gregor & Timor" of Larry David's series Curb Your Enthusiasm.
