= The Pick =

- Seinfeld episode
- Episode no.: Season 4 Episode 13
- Directed by: Tom Cherones
- Story by: Larry David and Marc Jaffe
- Teleplay by: Larry David
- Production code: 413
- Original air date: December 16, 1992

Guest appearances
- Heidi Swedberg as Susan Ross; Wayne Knight as Newman; Jennifer Campbell as Tia; Nicholas Hormann as Calvin Klein; Gina Hecht as Dana Foley

Episode chronology
← Previous "The Airport"	Next → "The Movie"
- Seinfeld season 4

"The Pick" is the 53rd episode of the sitcom Seinfeld. It is the 13th episode of the fourth season, and first aired on December 16, 1992 on NBC. In this episode, George is too hasty to reconcile with Susan, Elaine gets photographed with a nipple exposed for a Christmas card, Jerry's girlfriend shuns him as a nose-picker, and Calvin Klein steals Kramer's perfume pitch after rejecting it a year ago.

== Plot ==
George soliloquizes his regret over breaking up with Susan, even with all his complaints about Susan—such as his dread at going up her stairs each time—fresh in Jerry and Elaine's mind. Jerry urges him to see Elaine's therapist, Dana, before hastily reconciling. Jerry has received a Christmas card from Tia, the model he met in first class. Elaine envies the personalized card with Tia's photo, so Kramer offers to photograph her.

Tia shows Jerry a magazine sample of Calvin Klein's new beach-scented perfume, "Ocean". Jerry catches on that this idea was stolen from Kramer's rejected pitch from last year, but fails to keep Kramer from smelling the sample, which enrages him. George, consulting Dana, gets sidetracked trying to free his stuck jacket zipper; Dana also gets carried away grappling with the zipper, before coming to her senses and ending the fruitless session.

Elaine sends Christmas cards customized with Kramer's photography to family, colleagues, acquaintances, and Fred, her religious boyfriend. She discovers too late that her photographed outfit exposed a nipple. Newman confirms that the nipple is plain to see, and Jerry and Kramer console Elaine by baring their own chests.

In traffic, Tia is appalled when she sees Jerry twiddling with his nose from another car. She stops returning his calls, giving him no chance to explain that he was not picking his nose. George stands up for nose-pickers, imagining Moses as an example, but still would not date one. Meanwhile, Elaine has become the office pariah and gets judged by Fred over the Christmas card, while her young nephew has been debauched by the card. George imprudently complains that he alone did not get a card, and gets a noogie on her chest for his trouble.

Jerry and Kramer head to Calvin Klein headquarters, to respectively confront Tia and Calvin Klein himself. Tia is cold to Jerry's explanations, so he makes a scene self-righteously defending nose-picking, driving her away as he quotes The Merchant of Venice and The Elephant Man. Elaine, likewise, self-righteously drives Fred away.

George promises Susan that they can overcome their differences, just as, supposedly, Louis Pasteur and his wife did. He wins her back, but his dread returns as he goes up her stairs. He is inspired to get immediately dumped again by picking his nose.

Kramer is mollified when Klein scouts him as an underwear model for his impressive physique, and he strips down to his briefs to the approval of Klein's colleagues. He appears in an ad, but he is photographed with genitals exposed.

== Production ==
A deleted scene shows Kramer confronting the Calvin Klein marketer he met with last season in "The Pez Dispenser".
