= The Cheever Letters =

- Seinfeld episode
- Episode no.: Season 4 Episode 8
- Directed by: Tom Cherones
- Story by: Larry David; Elaine Pope; Tom Leopold
- Teleplay by: Larry David
- Production code: 408
- Original air date: October 28, 1992

Guest appearances
- Heidi Swedberg as Susan Ross; Warren Frost as Mr. Ross; Grace Zabriskie as Mrs. Ross; Lisa Malkiewicz as Sandra; Timothy Omundson as Ricky; Miguel Perez as Cuban diplomat; Vanessa Marquez as Receptionist

Episode chronology
← Previous "The Bubble Boy"	Next → "The Opera"
- Seinfeld season 4

"The Cheever Letters" is the eighth episode of the fourth season of the American television sitcom Seinfeld (and the 48th episode overall). It first aired on NBC in the United States on October 28, 1992. In this episode, George and Susan must face the aftermath of Susan's father's treasured cabin burning down; Kramer needs to replace the Cuban cigars he lost in the fire; and Jerry must date Elaine's secretary so she does not quit on his account. The episode was written by Larry David, Elaine Pope and Tom Leopold, and directed by Tom Cherones.

== Plot ==
Jerry reminds George of the irony that, in return for Susan's father gifting him fine Cuban cigars, not only did George give away the cigars, but the cigars then burned down Susan's father's cabin.

Jerry and George hunker down to write the sitcom pilot they are selling to NBC. Having no ideas, they welcome every distraction while accomplishing nothing. Jerry calls Elaine at work, but must head off Elaine's receptionist Sandra making her usual idle chitchat. Elaine asks Sandra to stop, but this clues Sandra in that Jerry complained, and she immediately quits in anguish.

After buying his way into Westchester Country Club with a cigar, Kramer can no longer tolerate public golf courses. With the cigars lost in the fire, Kramer scrounges for more, despite the Cuban trade embargo.

Susan brings George to dinner to meet her parents. Susan's father reminisces over the cabin's long history as a treasured family legacy. When Susan and George finally break the news of the fire, he retires from the table in shock, while Susan's mother, drunk, laughs it off.

For Elaine's sake, Jerry calls Sandra to make amends, and gets roped into a date which leads to amorous foreplay. After hearing Sandra's especially lewd dirty talk—which he can only inaudibly confide to George later—Jerry returns her banter, but blurts out, nonsensically, "the panties your mother laid out for you", which scares Sandra off. Knowing that Elaine will not let him live this down if she hears, Jerry urges Elaine to fire Sandra as soon as she returns to work.

In search of cigars, Kramer urgently meets with the Cuban diplomatic mission at the United Nations. The head diplomat takes Kramer's hard-won jacket in trade. Kramer and the diplomats all go golfing at Westchester, cigars in hand.

Dropping in on the Rosses, Jerry and George meet Susan's brother Ricky and paraplegic aunt Sara, who George supposedly resembles. Susan opens a trove of letters recovered from the cabin fire, which turn out to be salacious love letters to her father from novelist John Cheever. The family is dumbfounded as Susan's father unabashedly defends his gay love affair with the late Cheever.

After many false starts and repeatedly dozing off, Jerry and George have only written a few filler lines. Meanwhile, Sandra, transferred by Elaine on Jerry's advice, takes revenge and rats out Elaine for calling Europe long-distance on the company's dime. However, Elaine shows no sign of hearing any gossip, so Jerry relievedly covers her phone bills. Elaine leaves him with a gotcha, namechecking her mother and some panties that she has "laid out".
