= Seinfeld season 4 =

Seinfeld
- Season 4
- DVD cover
- Showrunner: Larry David
- Starring: Jerry Seinfeld; Julia Louis-Dreyfus; Michael Richards; Jason Alexander
- No. of episodes: 24

Release
- Original network: NBC
- Original release: August 12, 1992 – May 20, 1993

Season chronology
- ← Previous; Season 3 Next → Season 5

The fourth season of Seinfeld, an American comedy television series created by Jerry Seinfeld and Larry David, began airing on August 12, 1992, and concluded on May 20, 1993, on NBC.

== Production ==
Seinfeld was produced by Castle Rock Entertainment and aired on NBC in the United States. The executive producers were Larry David, George Shapiro, and Howard West with Tom Gammill and Max Pross as supervising producers. Bruce Kirschbaum was the executive consultant. This season was directed by Tom Cherones and was largely written by Larry David, Jerry Seinfeld, Larry Charles, Peter Mehlman and Andy Robin.

The series was set predominantly in an apartment block on New York City's Upper West Side; however, the fourth season was shot and filmed predominantly in CBS Studio Center in Studio City, California. The show features Jerry Seinfeld as himself, and a host of Jerry's friends and acquaintances, which include George Costanza, Elaine Benes, and Kramer, portrayed by Jason Alexander, Julia Louis-Dreyfus and Michael Richards, respectively.

== Story arcs ==
This season had numerous story arcs. The two part season premiere involved Jerry and George going to LA to find Kramer after he moved there at the end of the third season. The main story arc that spanned the rest of the season involved Jerry and George trying to make a TV pilot for NBC, during which George has a relationship with NBC executive Susan Ross and Jerry is stalked by a mentally disturbed human named Joe Davola.

== Reception ==
=== Critical reception ===
The review aggregator website Rotten Tomatoes reported a 100% approval rating with an average rating of 9.3/10, based on 20 critic reviews. The website's critics consensus reads, "The show about nothing tries on an overarching plot for a change and yields a riotous satire on television in the process, further solidifying its claim as master of the sitcom domain with observant humor mined from the mundane and uncomfortable." TV Guide named it #1 on their list of the greatest TV seasons. Jamie Malanowski of Time named it the best season of the series saying "A mix of high and low, of the self-referential and the hip, of things underfoot and out of left field."

=== Nielsen ratings ===
Season four was ranked No. 25 according to the Nielsen ratings system, with 12,754,700 estimated audience.

=== Awards and nominations ===
Season four received eleven Emmy nominations, three of which were won. The show won its first and only Emmy Award for Outstanding Comedy Series. Larry David won the Emmy for Outstanding Writing in a Comedy Series for the episode "The Contest". Michael Richards won his first out of three Emmy Awards for Outstanding Supporting Actor in a Comedy Series. Jerry Seinfeld was nominated for Outstanding Lead Actor in a Comedy Series. Jason Alexander was nominated for Outstanding Supporting Actor in a Comedy Series. Julia Louis-Dreyfus was nominated for Outstanding Supporting Actress in a Comedy Series. Tom Cherones was nominated for Outstanding Directing in a Comedy Series for "The Contest". Larry Charles was nominated for Outstanding Writing in a Comedy Series. Other nominees were Outstanding Achievement in Editing for a Comedy Series for "The Airport". Jason Alexander was nominated in the Golden Globe Award in the category for Best Performance by a Supporting Role in a Series, Mini-Series or Motion Picture for TV. This season won a Directors Guild of America (Tom Cherones) for "The Contest", and a Writers Guild of America (Larry David) for "The Contest".

== Crossover ==
In the eighth episode of the first season of Mad About You, which aired on November 11, 1992, Kramer sublets his apartment from Paul Buchman (the main character of Mad About You). When Paul asks about Jerry, Kramer tells him about the NBC show.

== Episodes ==
No. overall	No. in season	Title	Directed by	Written by	Original release date	Prod. code	US viewers (millions)
41	1	"The Trip"	Tom Cherones	Larry Charles	August 12, 1992	401	16.3
42	2	"The Trip"	Tom Cherones	Larry Charles	August 19, 1992	402	15.1
In Los Angeles, Kramer struggles to get acting work, while shopping his own spec script. Jerry has been invited on The Tonight Show, and invites George along to look for Kramer in L.A. George asks the hotel housekeeper to not tuck in his blanket, while Jerry blames her for throwing away his newly written jokes. Kramer is oblivious that he has been identified as a serial killer on the news, even as police close in. Jerry and George ride along with some policemen and an arrested carjacker to clear Kramer's name at the station. Absent: Julia Louis-Dreyfus as Elaine Benes
43	3	"The Pitch"	Tom Cherones	Larry David	September 16, 1992	403	17.6
NBC executives invite Jerry to pitch a TV show starring himself. George appoints himself as writer, conceiving a "show about nothing" based on themselves, with no story. Kramer knowingly trades a broken radar detector to Newman, which gets him pulled over for speeding. At NBC, Jerry draws the ire of writer "Crazy" Joe Davola upon Kramer and himself. George's pretension as an inspired writer sabotages the pitch, but he thinks he has a chance romantically with Susan Ross, one of the executives. Elaine's romantic Europe trip with her psychiatrist, Dr. Reston, is derailed when his mind drifts to Davola's psychiatric treatment.
44	4	"The Ticket"	Tom Cherones	Larry David	September 16, 1992	404	17.6
Kramer shows signs of brain damage after surviving an attack from Davola, but has no chance to see a doctor before Newman drags Kramer off to traffic court to back up his excuse for speeding. Jerry becomes paranoid that Davola plans to get him next. Susan miraculously supports Jerry and George's pitch and gets them a pilot order, even after Kramer threw up Jerry's expired milk on her, but George cannot stop comparing their deal to Ted Danson's income. Jerry throws away a watch gifted from his parents, but Uncle Leo fishes it out of the trash and keeps it. Kramer testifies in court that he was suicidal over a lifelong failure to become a banker.
45	5	"The Wallet"	Tom Cherones	Larry David	September 23, 1992	405	17.6
Jerry's parents visit to see a doctor for Morty's back pain, and Jerry concocts an untenable excuse for his watch being missing all week. George bluffs turning down NBC's deal to hold out for more money, appalling Jerry since they have nothing of merit to begin with. Susan's father gives George Cuban cigars, but George foists them off on Kramer. At the back clinic, Morty cannot find his wallet, and accuses the doctor of swindling him. Elaine returns from Europe, finding herself trapped in her relationship by Reston's manipulations.
46	6	"The Watch"	Tom Cherones	Larry David	September 30, 1992	406	15.2
Uncle Leo wears Jerry's watch to dinner with Jerry and his parents, and Jerry demands to buy the watch back to allay suspicion. Helen pressures Jerry to ask out Naomi, the restaurant hostess, and he discovers too late that she has a cartoonish laugh. George's bluff is called when NBC president Russell Dalrymple rescinds the pilot offer, so George forces himself into Dalrymple's home at dinnertime to appeal his case. Kramer poses as Elaine's boyfriend and tries to intimidate Reston, but Reston beguiles Kramer into doing his bidding. Elaine falls for Davola, not knowing that he is getting psychiatric treatment.
47	7	"The Bubble Boy"	Tom Cherones	Larry David & Larry Charles	October 7, 1992	407	17.1
Susan invites George and Jerry to her father's cabin upstate for the weekend, but Naomi discovers Jerry's mockery of her laugh and drops out. Jerry becomes obliged to make a stop to visit a young fan, an immunodeficient "bubble boy", for his birthday. George races ahead to gratuitously "make good time", leaving Jerry and Elaine behind without directions. Jerry donates a signed photo to a diner, then tries to take it back. Susan and George are forced to keep the ill-mannered bubble boy company. Kramer's weekend golfing at a country club is preempted, so he heads to the cabin unannounced with Naomi.
48	8	"The Cheever Letters"	Tom Cherones	Story by : Larry David and Elaine Pope & Tom Leopold; Teleplay by : Larry David	October 28, 1992	408	15.1
Susan and George confess that Kramer burned down Susan's father's cabin with one of the very cigars he gave George. Jerry complains that Elaine's receptionist, Sandra, is too chatty, but then must make nice to stop her quitting. They end up on an amorous date, but Jerry scares Sandra off by awkwardly reciprocating her dirty talk, and must stop this gossip getting back to Elaine. Kramer illicitly bargains with Cuban diplomats for more cigars to buy into the country club. Jerry and George hunker down to write their sitcom pilot, fruitlessly. A trove of love letters from novelist John Cheever to Susan's father is salvaged from the fire.
49	9	"The Opera"	Tom Cherones	Larry Charles	November 4, 1992	409	16.7
Kramer secures opening night opera tickets to Pagliacci for the group, but the threat of "Crazy" Joe Davola looms for both Jerry and Elaine: Davola threatens to "put the kibosh" on Jerry over the phone, and Elaine, discovering Davola's obsessive shrine to her, draws his wrath by calling off their opera plans. Kramer and George decide to scalp two leftover tickets, leaving Jerry and Elaine stuck outside the theater as Davola stalks them in full clown costume. George, whose only opera attire is a too-small tuxedo, is caught scalping by a man who once threw him out of a wedding. Susan changes plans and joins him just as he sells her unused ticket.
50	10	"The Virgin"	Tom Cherones	Story by : Peter Mehlman and Peter Farrelly & Bob Farrelly; Teleplay by : Peter Mehlman	November 11, 1992	410	16.2
George realizes that he could use his job writing for NBC to meet women other than Susan, but he would not have this job without Susan on his side at NBC. Jerry starts dating Marla (Jane Leeves), who confides that she is a virgin, and Elaine takes it upon herself to educate Marla about sex. Jerry and George's last-ditch writing session for NBC is derailed when Elaine causes Ping the delivery boy to crash his bike while bringing their food. Kramer has given his TV to George, but now freeloads off Jerry's TV instead. George gets Susan fired by kissing her during the NBC meeting.
51	11	"The Contest"	Tom Cherones	Larry David	November 18, 1992	411	18.5
George is caught masturbating by his mother, who throws her back out and gets hospitalized. The shameful ordeal makes George swear off masturbation, but, seeing the group's disbelief, he starts a wager to test who can hold out the longest. Kramer gives in at first opportunity, leaving everyone else tempted by powerful sexual fantasies: a naked woman across the street appears in Jerry's window while Marla is reluctant to lose her virginity to him, George starts ogling the silhouette of a woman receiving sponge baths in his mother's hospital room, and John F. Kennedy Jr. comes on to Elaine at aerobics class. In 2009, TV Guide ranked this episode as the greatest episode of any television show.
52	12	"The Airport"	Tom Cherones	Larry Charles	November 25, 1992	412	14.5
Jerry and Elaine, flying back to New York, are rebooked on a flight which splits them up between first class and coach. Jerry unapologetically relegates Elaine to coach, where she suffers numerous indignities while Jerry and a glamorous model flirtatiously indulge in the luxuries of first class. As George and Kramer bounce between airports to pick them up, George taunts a convict being transported and restrained by police. Kramer fingers a passerby as a former roommate, and boards the man's flight to collect a debt from 20 years ago. Elaine's luggage is redirected after she accuses a skycap of ripping her off.
53	13	"The Pick"	Tom Cherones	Story by : Larry David and Marc Jaffe; Teleplay by : Larry David	December 16, 1992	413	16.2
Before George hastily reconciles with Susan, Jerry and Elaine remind him of his many misgivings and send him to Elaine's therapist Dana, but George and Dana both become fixated on his stuck zipper. Elaine sends a Christmas card, customized with Kramer's photography of herself, to nearly everyone she knows, but discovers too late that the photo exposed a nipple. Jerry is dating Tia, the model he met in first class, but she is repelled after seeing him seemingly picking his nose. Kramer discovers Calvin Klein's new beach-scented perfume, and confronts Calvin Klein himself for stealing his rejected pitch from last season.
54	14	"The Movie"	Tom Cherones	Steve Skrovan & Bill Masters & Jon Hayman	January 6, 1993	415	17.6
Jerry must inform the others that he can't make the movie CheckMate with them, then get back to the comedy club in time for his set, but gets accosted by Pat Buckles, a small-time comedian wanting to rub elbows. George waits in the wrong line and fails to get tickets, so everyone goes to another theater. With Elaine forced to save too many seats at once, George running in and out while losing his ticket stubs, Kramer ravenously craving a hot dog while waiting for Jerry, and Jerry not knowing everyone left, they all miss each other and lose their seats. One by one, they end up seeing Rochelle, Rochelle, an erotic film.
55	15	"The Visa"	Tom Cherones	Peter Mehlman	January 27, 1993	414	N/A
George impresses Cheryl, a lawyer, with his jokes, and demands that Jerry stop being funny in front of Cheryl. Jerry has set up Babu Bhatt with a job and apartment to make up for driving him out of business last season, but Babu is arrested for overstaying his visa after his renewal application is mixed up in Jerry's mail, which Elaine picked up, then sat on. Cheryl agrees to help extricate Babu, and also dismisses Ping's lawsuit against Elaine, but becomes attracted to Jerry's affectation of total despondency. Kramer returns from fantasy baseball camp after inciting a bench-clearing brawl and knocking out Mickey Mantle.
56	16	"The Shoes"	Tom Cherones	Larry David & Jerry Seinfeld	February 4, 1993	417	26.9
Jerry and George leave Elaine out of their pilot script. Kramer snubs Jerry's ex-girlfriend, Gail, but hooks up with her instead when his snub inadvertently becomes negging. Gail backhandedly compliments Elaine's shoes from a high-end store, sparking a feud. At the power lunch restaurant where Gail works, Elaine passes stomach flu to Dalrymple just before his meeting with Jerry and George. While Dalrymple throws up in agony, his teenage daughter arrives and George is caught peeking at her cleavage. The pilot is canceled again, and Jerry and George play Elaine and Gail off each other in enlisting their help.
57	17	"The Outing"	Tom Cherones	Larry Charles	February 11, 1993	416	28.0
Elaine addresses Jerry and George as a closeted gay couple as a prank when she notices an eavesdropper, not knowing this is Sharon (Paula Marshall), a journalism student who is interviewing Jerry for an article. Sharon develops a gay angle for her story, which is backed up when she sees Jerry and George bicker like an old married couple. Kramer's birthday gift of a defective two-line phone causes Jerry to dig himself deeper with Sharon. Major newspapers pick up the story, forcing Jerry and George to confront their shocked parents. Despite everyone's protestations, they all concur "not that there's anything wrong with that".
58	18	"The Old Man"	Tom Cherones	Story by : Bruce Kirschbaum; Teleplay by : Larry Charles	February 18, 1993	418	22.7
Elaine convinces George and Jerry that volunteering to visit the elderly will bring fulfillment, but Jerry is assigned to an antagonistic old man. Kramer and Newman start a side hustle to haul away obsolete vinyl records to resell, but Jerry's kitschy records are not worth selling. Kramer and Newman plunder the old man's unwanted record collection, but accidentally destroy his false teeth. George meets the old man's live-in caretaker from Senegal, believing that women who do not speak English are his last hope. Elaine visits an old lady with an enormous goiter on her neck, but discovers her scandalous history with Mohandas Gandhi.
59	19	"The Implant"	Tom Cherones	Peter Mehlman	February 25, 1993	419	27.4
Jerry dumps his new girlfriend Sidra (Teri Hatcher) when Elaine declares her breasts to be implants. Elaine reassesses after accidentally grabbing Sidra's breasts in their health club sauna, to Jerry's anguish. After failing to put the moves on his girlfriend Betsy, George goes along to her aunt's funeral in Detroit to be recognized as her boyfriend. Kramer has George falsely claim a bereavement discount to earn miles for his own Puerto Rico trip, but George must get a death certificate as proof. Kramer insists he spotted Salman Rushdie at the health club, and George thoughtlessly double-dips a chip while paying his respects.
60	20	"The Junior Mint"	Tom Cherones	Andy Robin	March 18, 1993	421	26.4
Jerry starts dating a woman whose name he cannot remember (Susan Walters), and intends to find out without asking. Elaine reconnects with Roy, a starving artist ex-boyfriend, who is now slim and desirable after losing weight from heartbreak over her. With Roy hospitalized for a splenectomy, Kramer drags Jerry along to watch the surgery, but Jerry fights off a Junior Mint he offers, sending it flying into Roy's body unnoticed. George spends a small windfall from a bank account to speculate on Roy's death by buying his art. Jerry's roundabout efforts reveal only that the mystery woman's name rhymes with an unknown female body part.
61	21	"The Smelly Car"	Tom Cherones	Larry David & Peter Mehlman	April 15, 1993	422	25.0
Jerry gets his car back from a restaurant valet, but powerful body odor has taken root in the car. The smell clings to Elaine, repelling her boyfriend. Susan, after breaking up with George, has become a lesbian, and George believes that this was about him. Jerry cleverly gets the restaurant maître d' (Michael Des Barres) to reimburse him, but the smell endures even after Jerry and Elaine get professional cleaning. George keeps a video rental for Rochelle, Rochelle an extra day to avoid a rewind fee, but the video gets stolen. Kramer steals away Susan's girlfriend, even though she was a lifelong lesbian.
62	22	"The Handicap Spot"	Tom Cherones	Larry David	May 13, 1993	420	27.6
Everyone pools money to buy an engagement gift for beloved mutual friend "the Drake". George borrows his father Frank's car to drive them to a mall, and Kramer convinces him to park in a handicap spot. This causes a wheelchair accident for a disabled woman, and an angry mob destroys the car. The engagement is called off, foiling everyone's plan to enjoy the big screen TV they gifted. Kramer falls in love with the disabled woman, and ropes George into buying her a new wheelchair together. George gives his parents an excuse for the totaled car, but Frank, a hard-working fundraiser for the disabled, is arrested for parking in a handicap spot.
63	23	"The Pilot"	Tom Cherones	Larry David	May 20, 1993	423	32.8
64	24	"The Pilot"	Tom Cherones	Larry David	May 20, 1993	424	32.8
NBC is set to produce the pilot for Jerry and George's sitcom, Jerry. After only one date, Dalrymple has carried a torch for Elaine for two months, but she rejects him and he becomes increasingly erratic. George fears that his personal success will draw divine retribution, becoming paranoid over a medically inexplicable white discoloration on his upper lip. Kramer auditions to play himself, but gets diarrhea and becomes constipated from holding it in too long. Elaine reports Monk's, under new management, for employment discrimination because all the waitresses are well-endowed. The actors are cast, but "Elaine" gets into character through intimacy with Jerry, "Kramer" is hostile to unsolicited advice, and Jerry finds out that he cannot act. As taping begins, George cannot let go of whether "Kramer" stole a box of raisins from the audition, Dalrymple disappears, and "Crazy" Joe Davola continues to stalk Jerry. Nearly everyone who appeared in season 4 reacts to the pilot when it goes on air.
