= The Shoes (Seinfeld) =

- Seinfeld episode
- Episode no.: Season 4 Episode 16
- Directed by: Tom Cherones
- Written by: Larry David & Jerry Seinfeld
- Production code: 417
- Original air date: February 4, 1993

Guest appearances
- Bob Balaban as Russell Dalrymple; Denise Richards as Molly Dalrymple; Gina Hecht as Dana Foley; Anita Barone as Gail Cunningham; Michael Ornstein as Waiter

Episode chronology
← Previous "The Visa"	Next → "The Outing"
- Seinfeld season 4

"The Shoes" is the 56th episode of the NBC television sitcom Seinfeld. It is the 16th episode for the fourth season, and first aired on February 4, 1993. In the episode, Elaine feuds with Jerry's ex-girlfriend, Gail, for calling out Elaine's shoes from a high-end store. Jerry and George's pilot deal with NBC is canceled again when NBC president Russell Dalrymple catches George peeking at his teenage daughter's cleavage.

== Plot ==
Jerry and George have gotten into the swing of writing their pilot for NBC, which now features themselves, Jerry's butler, and Kramer. They remember to include Elaine, but, not knowing how to write women, scrap her appearance.

Kramer encounters Jerry's chef ex-girlfriend Gail; remembering that Gail would not kiss Jerry after three dates, Kramer snubs her, earning Jerry's thanks. In response, Gail goes to Monk's Café to complain to Jerry, where she notices Elaine's eye-catching shoes. Gail puts Elaine on the spot to confess that the shoes are from Botticelli's, a shop which Gail claims to be beyond her own means. Elaine is needled by Gail's backhanded compliment, while Jerry is oblivious. Jerry refuses to share his sandwich with Elaine, especially since she has come down with a cough.

Jerry and George seek feedback ahead of another meeting with NBC. At George's therapy session, Dana finds the script unfunny, and George defends himself first with denial, then by blaming Jerry. Elaine avoids giving her opinion entirely.

To Jerry's chagrin, Kramer and Gail have hooked up after Kramer's snubbing inadvertently became negging. As a result, Kramer has heard about Elaine's shoes—inciting such fury from her that all three men shrink back. At Pfeiffer's, the power lunch restaurant where Gail works, Elaine barges into the kitchen to browbeat Gail, and sneezes on a plate of pasta primavera that is served to NBC president Russell Dalrymple.

Dalrymple contracts stomach flu and meets with Jerry and George at home, but runs to the bathroom to throw up in agony every time he tries to finish his thoughts on the script. Learning that he got sick from pasta at Pfeiffer's, George warns him about unsanitary food at another restaurant, Bouchard's. Dalrymple's 15-year-old daughter from a previous marriage arrives, and Dalrymple catches George—at Jerry's nudging—gawking at her cleavage. After leaving, Jerry and George learn that their pilot has been canceled again, and that Elaine is to blame for the pasta contamination.

Cut off by Dalrymple, Jerry and George plan to catch him at Pfeiffer's, but Gail demands Elaine's shoes as the price for her cooperation. Rationalizing that the male gaze operates at the "molecular level", Jerry reckons that Dalrymple likewise could not resist cleavage coming into view. They rope Elaine into not only giving up the shoes, but coming along to Pfeiffer's in a low-cut dress. Goaded by their belief that Gail, but not her, could seduce Dalrymple, Elaine performs many antics to raise Dalrymple's gaze to her cleavage, whereupon he is immediately smitten.

Dalrymple revives the pilot deal and gets a date with Elaine in return, giving her leverage over Jerry and George to demand a role in the script. George, hearing that the date is at Bouchard's, starts choking.

== Production ==
This was the first episode of season 4 in which Seinfeld was moved from its Wednesday time slot to Thursday at 9:30, right after Cheers, which was in its last season. Seinfeld would take over Cheers' spot the following fall and remain there for the rest of the series. The four main characters apprised their viewers of this change in a short segment that ran during the Super Bowl. It was revealed in the DVD "Inside Look" that many on the show were worried that people would be viewing Seinfeld for the first time in this new spot and therefore would know nothing about the story arc of Jerry and George's NBC pilot. The show's popularity skyrocketed through the rest of the season, however, starting its successful run. As David Sims wrote at The A.V. Club, "The whole thing was promoted during the Super Bowl and was the start of Seinfeld moving from semi-popular critical hit to world-invading zeitgeist water-cooler explosion."

== Critical reception ==
Reviewer David Sims gave the episode an A, saying, "Every cast member gets some really fun material to play with and the plots spiral together marvelously... This plot is a great dissection of male honor, or the bro code, or whatever you want to call it. ... Seinfeld episodes like this are almost like heist movies—it's just great watching a plot come together." Aaron George of Place2BeNation, giving a grade of 7 out of 10, said, "I continue to really enjoy all the 'writing' scenes. They truly capture the essence of the excitement of finding hilarity in the most mundane lines that you write." On the other hand, "It's starting to stretch the believability a bit that Jerry is continuing to write this pilot with George. He's brought nothing but strife since to the project from day one."
