= Robin's Hoods =

American drama television series

- Created by: Aaron Spelling; Marcia Basichis; David Chisholm
- Starring: Linda Purl; Rick Springfield; Julie McCullough
- Theme music composer: John Nordstrom
- Composer: Ken Harrison
- Country of origin: United States
- Original language: English
- No. of seasons: 1
- No. of episodes: 22

Production
- Executive producer: Rob Gilmer
- Running time: 45 minutes
- Production company: Spelling Television

Original release
- Network: Syndication
- Release: August 22, 1994 – March 13, 1995

Robin's Hoods is an American drama series that aired in first-run syndication from August 22, 1994 to March 13, 1995.

== Overview ==
Brett Robin is a prosecutor whose husband is a policeman. After he is killed, she learns he bought a bar and hired five first time offenders to work there as part of their parole. She keeps the bar open and occasionally her five employees take it upon themselves to help her using their criminal skills. In the last few episodes, Purl was frequently absent due to her pregnancy and Rick Springfield was featured as the bar manager Nick Collins.

== Cast ==
- Linda Purl as Brett Robin
- Jennifer Campbell as Annie Beckett
- David Gail as Eddie Bartlett
- Mayte Vilán as Maria Alvarez (1994)
- Julie McCullough as Stacey Wright
- Gretchen Palmer as K.T. Parker (1995)
- Claire Yarlett as Mackenzie "Mac" Magnuson
- Rick Springfield as Nick Collins (1995)

== Episodes ==
No.	Title	Directed by	Written by	Original release date
1	"New Beginnings"	Marty Pasetta	Story by : Aaron Spelling & Marcia Basichis & David Chisholm; Teleplay by : Rob Gilmer & George Geiger & Michael Gleason	August 22, 1994
2	"Memories Are Made of This"	Unknown	Unknown	August 29, 1994
3	"To Heir is Human"	Unknown	Unknown	September 5, 1994
4	"Dead Certain"	Unknown	Unknown	September 12, 1994
5	"Old Friends, Dead Ends"	Unknown	Unknown	September 19, 1994
6	"Girl Meets Boy"	Unknown	Unknown	September 26, 1994
7	"Double or Nothing"	Unknown	Unknown	October 3, 1994
8	"Bad Girl"	Unknown	Unknown	October 17, 1994
9	"The Pawn"	Unknown	Unknown	October 31, 1994
10	"Eddie & Annie"	Unknown	Unknown	November 7, 1994
11	"Unto Thyself Be True"	Unknown	Unknown	November 14, 1994
12	"Country Comfort"	Unknown	Unknown	November 21, 1994
13	"Send My Regrets"	Unknown	Unknown	November 28, 1994
14	"Hell Hath No Fury"	Unknown	Unknown	January 16, 1995
15	"Rock and a Hard Place"	Unknown	Unknown	January 23, 1995
16	"Seems Like Old Times"	Unknown	Unknown	January 30, 1995
17	"If Looks Could Kill"	Unknown	Unknown	February 6, 1995
18	"Labours of Love"	Unknown	Unknown	February 13, 1995
19	"Heartbreaker"	Win Phelps	Chris Brancato	February 20, 1995
20	"Deja Vu"	Anson Williams	Robert L. McCullough	February 27, 1995
21	"Advise and Consent"	Gus Trikonis	Kate Shelley & Chris Brancato	March 12, 1995
22	"The Last Seduction"	John B. Moranville	Robert L. McCullough & Kate Shelley	March 13, 1995
