= Gina Hecht =

American actress

- Hecht in Mork & Mindy (1979)
- Born: December 6, 1953 (age 72); Houston, Texas, U.S.
- Education: North Carolina School of the Arts
- Occupation: Actress
- Years active: 1978–present
- Known for: Mork & Mindy; Night Shift; Dave; A Matter of Perspective; General Hospital
- Spouse: Brian Herskowitz (1988–present)

Gina Hecht (/ˈɡiːnə ˈhɛkt/; born December 6, 1953) is an American actress.

== Early life ==
Born in Houston, Texas on December 6, 1953, Hecht is the daughter of stage actress Pauline Meyer Hecht and stockbroker Harold Hecht. An alumna of North Carolina School of the Arts, Hecht had already made up her mind to become an actress at age 10, the moment she first saw her mother onstage. She attended Oran M. Roberts Elementary School, Pershing Junior High, Bellaire High, and Monticello College, before obtaining her degree from North Carolina.

== Career ==
Hecht's big break came in the fall of 1978 with a recurring role in the NBC sitcom Hizzoner; the following season she was hired for the role of Jeanie DaVinci on the successful TV series Mork & Mindy. Her first film role was in the 1982 Ron Howard movie Night Shift, alongside Henry Winkler and Michael Keaton.

In addition to a career on TV and in films, she has also worked the stage. In 2011, she appeared in Neil Simon's The Prisoner of Second Avenue alongside Jason Alexander. Hecht had a recurring role on General Hospital as Judge Rachel Lasser from 2015 to 2019.

== Personal life ==
In 1988, she married writer and actor Brian Herskowitz. She has a sister, Esther, and a brother, Harold.

== Filmography ==
=== Television ===
- 1979–1981: Mork & Mindy as Jeanie DaVinci
- 1979: Hizzonner as Melanie
- 1981: The Love Boat as Norma Kittredge
- 1987: Everything's Relative as Emily Cabot
- 1988: HeartBeat as Patty
- 1989: Baywatch: "Panic at Malibu Pier" as Gina Pomeroy
- 1990: Star Trek: The Next Generation: "A Matter of Perspective" as Manua Apgar
- 1992: Taking Back My Life: The Nancy Ziegenmeyer Story as Deanne
- 1992–1993: Seinfeld: "The Pick", "The Shoes", "The Pilot" as Dana Foley
- 1994: Without Warning as Barbara Shiller
- 1995: Blossom: "You Say Tomato" as Teacher
- 1995: Diagnosis: Murder: "Murder in the Courthouse" as Justine Brady
- 1997: Friends as Richard's Date
- 2000: Diagnosis: Murder: "Swan Song" as Rhonda
- 2001: Jag Past Tense as Jane Maples
- 2005: Pizza My Heart as Gloria Montebello
- 2006: Dexter as Mrs. Tucci
- 2009: Desperate Housewives: "The Coffee Cup" as Judge Mary Gallagher
- 2009–2012: Glee: "Mash-Up", "Goodbye", "Glee, Actually" as Mrs. Puckerman
- 2013: The Middle: "Life Skills" as Ms. Schaefer
- 2014: Castle: "That 70's Show" as Marie Russo
- 2015–2019: General Hospital as Judge Rachel Lasser
- 2020–2023: Dave as Carol
- 2023: Tacoma FD: "Gone Dutch" as Laura the Widow
- 2024: Grey's Anatomy: "We've Only Just Begun" as Mrs. Sutton

=== Film ===
- 1982: Night Shift as Charlotte Koogle
- 1985: St. Elmo's Fire as Judith
- 1986: Hyper Sapien: People from Another Star as Newscaster
- 1987: Unfinished Business as Vickie
- 1993: Family Prayers as Arlene
- 1995: One Night Stand as Cy Watson
- 1998: Can I Play? as Nancy
- 1999: EDtv as Party Girl
- 2001: Odessa or Bust as God
- 2002: Clockstoppers as Meter Maid
- 2008: Seven Pounds as Dr. Briar
- 2008: The Last Word as Hilde Morris
- 2017: Fight Your Way Out as Jane Stone
