= Elizabeth Dennehy =

American television and film actress

- Years active: 1988–present
- Spouse: James Lancaster
- Children: 2
- Father: Brian Dennehy

Elizabeth Dennehy is an American television and film actress, who has appeared in such television series as Guiding Light, Seinfeld, Charmed, Without a Trace and Star Trek: The Next Generation, and also in films such as Clear and Present Danger, Gattaca, Soldier, and Red Dragon.

== Early life ==
Dennehy is the daughter of actor Brian Dennehy. She obtained her acting courses from the London Academy of Music and Dramatic Art.

== Career ==
Dennehy's career began in 1988 when she appeared as Christina "Blake" Lindsey in the TV series drama Guiding Light. She appeared in the series Star Trek: The Next Generation in the two-part episode "The Best of Both Worlds" as Lt. Commander Shelby. In 2017, Den of Geek ranked Dennehy's role as Lt. Commander Shelby as one of the top ten guest star roles on Star Trek: The Next Generation. In 2023, she reprised the role in the third season of Star Trek: Picard as Admiral Shelby who took the Federation starship U.S.S. Enterprise NCC-1701-F on its ceremonial voyage for Frontier Day.

She has also appeared on the stage, such as playing Stella Kowalski in the 1994 production of A Streetcar Named Desire and playing Donna Marsala in, as well as co-creating, the environmental and immersive theater production Tony n' Tina's Wedding.

== Filmography ==
Film and television roles
Year	Title	Role	Notes
1988–1989	Guiding Light	Christina 'Blake' Bauer Lindsey Thorpe	TV series
1990	Star Trek: The Next Generation	Lt. Cmdr. Shelby	Episode: "The Best of Both Worlds"
1992	The Waterdance	Candy	
1992	Quantum Leap	Beth Ryan	Episode: "Promised Land - December 22, 1971"
1993	Class of '96	Dr. Anders	Episode: "The Adventures of Pat's Man and Robin"
1993	A Place to Be Loved	Kathy Magnuson	TV film
1993	Seinfeld	The Drakette (uncredited) / Allison	2 episodes: "Pilot" and "The Handicap Spot"
1993	Brooklyn Bridge	Flora	Episode: "The Date"
1994	Clear and Present Danger	Reporter #2	
1994	Jack Reed: A Search for Justice	Sara	TV film
1996	The Lazarus Man	Elizabeth Pratchett	Episode: "Awakening"
1997	Runaway Car	Shari Todd	TV film
1997	On the Edge of Innocence	Miss Fogarty	TV film; uncredited
1997	The Game	Maria	
1997	Gattaca	Pre-School Teacher	
1997	C-16: FBI	Dana Brown	Episode: "The Sandman"
1998	Soldier	Jimmy Pig's Wife	
1998	Any Day Now	–	Episode: "You Shoulda Seen My Daddy"
1999	The Last Man on Planet Earth	Dr. Beverly Stokes	TV film
1999	Come On, Get Happy: The Partridge Family Story	Jeremy's Mom	TV film
1999	Hard Time: Hostage Hotel	Susan Sinclair	TV film
2000	NYPD Blue	Melanie Pratt	Episode: "Everybody Plays the Mule"
2000	Chicago Hope	Mrs. Seldon	Episode: "Cold Hearts"
2001	Judging Amy	Atty. Salias	Episode: "The Undertow"
2001	Gideon's Crossing	Mrs. Fitzhugh	2 episodes
2001	Murder, She Wrote: The Last Free Man	Archivist	TV film
2001	The Agency	–	3 episodes
2002	Red Dragon	Beverly	
2005	Numb3rs	Ms. Ford	Episode: "Sacrifice"
2005	Without a Trace	Victoria	Episode: "Viuda Negra"
2006	Commander in Chief	Sue Brantley	Episode: "The Price You Pay"
2004–2006	Charmed	Sandra (Elder)	8 episodes
2007	Welcome to Paradise	Helen Brown	
2008	Boston Legal	Samantha Taylor	Episode: "Roe vs Wade: The Musical"
2008	Medium	Hasting's Boss	Episode: "A Cure for What Ails You"
2008	Hancock	Rail Crossing Crowd #2	
2009	The Mentalist	Kathryn Hawkes	Episode: "Paint It Red"
2012	Rizzoli & Isles	Mrs. Lawson	Episode: "Dirty Little Secret"
2012	Janeane from Des Moines	Bible Study Group	
2013	Masters of Sex	–	Episode: "Race To Space"
2013	The Young and the Restless	Lauara Flannery	Episode: "18 October 2013"
2014	Midnight	Nina	Short
2017	American Folk	Ann	
2020	The Show Must Go Online	Gloucester/King Henry IV	2 episodes
2023	Star Trek: Picard	Fleet Admiral Elizabeth Shelby	Episode: "Võx"
2024	Horizon: An American Saga – Chapter 1	Mrs. Riordan	
