= The Airport =

- Seinfeld episode
- Episode no.: Season 4 Episode 12
- Directed by: Tom Cherones
- Written by: Larry Charles
- Production code: 412
- Original air date: November 25, 1992

Guest appearances
- Jennifer Campbell as Tia; Jim J. Bullock as Coach Flight Attendant; Allan Wasserman as Grossbard; Annie Korzen as Passenger; Karen Denise Williams as First Class Flight Attendant; Scott Burkholder as Prisoner; Deck McKenzie as Security Guard

Episode chronology
← Previous "The Contest"	Next → "The Pick"
- Seinfeld season 4

"The Airport" is the 52nd episode of the sitcom Seinfeld. It is the 12th episode of the fourth season and aired on November 25, 1992 on NBC. In this episode, Elaine suffers the indignities of flying in coach when Jerry takes a first-class seat for himself. Hopping between airports to pick them up, George gets sidetracked by Kramer chasing a bygone debt.

== Plot ==
In St. Louis, Jerry and Elaine are flying back to New York. George is picking them up at JFK Airport, to pay off a bet he lost against Jerry: failing to jump high enough to touch an awning. To make up time after missing an airport shuttle, Elaine and Jerry hurriedly drop off bags with a skycap, but Elaine balks at Jerry tipping $5 per bag. Accused by Elaine of ripping them off, the skycap covertly redirects her suitcase to Honolulu.

With their flight canceled, Jerry and Elaine get rebooked on a flight taking off immediately for LaGuardia, with no time to notify George. One of the seats is in first class, and Jerry snaps it up, refusing to downgrade his lifestyle. He unapologetically relegates Elaine to riding in coach, where she is walled in by a cheapskate passenger with many carry-ons. Elaine reluctantly and awkwardly clambers past the passenger to use the bathroom, where she must hold her breath against a powerful stench. The meal cart blocks off her seat until meal service has ended, leaving only a kosher meal for her.

In first class, Jerry sits next to a glamorous model; she recounts her sultry photo shoots, and becomes charmed by his knowledge "about nothing". They flirtatiously indulge in complimentary face towels, slippers, champagne and wine, potpourri in the bathroom, haute cuisine, chocolate fudge sundaes, comfy pillows, and cookies. Elaine sneaks into first class to sleep in an empty seat, but is evicted despite her pleadings. Woken by the commotion, Jerry is callously unsympathetic.

George's meticulously timed pickup is derailed when Kramer changes route and gets stuck in traffic. They get to JFK late, but get a reprieve from the flight change. George gets the last copy of Time magazine, hoping that Jerry namedropped him in a blurb inside. A convict being transported demands a copy because he is featured on the cover, but, being restrained by police, he has no recourse as George taunts him. On the way to LaGuardia, Kramer belatedly fingers a passerby at JFK as John Grossbard, a roommate who stiffed him out of $240 for rent 20 years ago.

When the flight is rerouted back to JFK, Kramer jumps at the chance to collect his debt. Since the passerby has boarded a flight, Kramer plots to buy a ticket just to get onboard, then get a refund. Wanting frequent flyer miles, George lends his credit card to buy two tickets, but Kramer is enticed by the cheapest fare, forgetting that it is non-refundable.

On the plane, the passerby does not recognize Kramer, who demands his wallet and is taken away by security. George gets trapped in the plane bathroom with the aggrieved convict as the plane takes off. As Elaine waits for her suitcase futilely, the model, mobbed by photographers, gives Jerry her number. Kramer pops out of the baggage carousel, having shaken off security by running under their plane as it landed.

== Production ==
The cast have identified this episode as a turning point where Jerry's character became defined as having good fortune, in contrast to traditionally self-deprecating comedy characters.

In the scene where Elaine is offered the kosher meal, the voice from across the aisle, claiming he had ordered it, is Larry David's. Larry Charles, the writer of the episode, appears as the passenger responsible for the smelly bathroom; he recalls being often recognized for this role over his other walk-ons. Deck McKenzie, Jerry Seinfeld's stand-in on the show, appears as the security guard.

When confronted by the shackled prisoner in the airport gift shop, George says, "But you are, Blanche. You are in the shackles!" This is a reference to What Ever Happened to Baby Jane?, where Baby Jane Hudson delivers a similar line to Blanche Hudson, who is using a wheelchair.

A deleted scene shows that Jerry, visiting Elaine in coach, was the one who suggested she sneak into first class. An alternate ending was filmed in which, after getting roughed up, George gets off the plane and leaves with everyone else, while Elaine settles for claiming somebody else's luggage.
