= The Virgin (Seinfeld) =

- Seinfeld episode
- Episode no.: Season 4 Episode 10
- Directed by: Tom Cherones
- Story by: Peter Mehlman; Peter Farrelly; Bobby Farrelly
- Teleplay by: Peter Mehlman
- Production code: 410
- Original air date: November 11, 1992

Guest appearances
- Jane Leeves as Marla; Heidi Swedberg as Susan Ross; Leah Lail as Stacy; Ping Wu as Ping

Episode chronology
← Previous "The Opera"	Next → "The Contest"
- Seinfeld season 4

"The Virgin" is the tenth episode of the fourth season of the American television sitcom Seinfeld (and the 50th episode overall). It first aired on NBC in the United States on November 11, 1992. In this episode, Jerry and George have one day left to write a pilot idea to pitch to NBC. Jerry starts dating Marla, a virgin, but Elaine takes it upon herself to educate Marla about sex. The cast assembled to read this episode's script on October 14, 1992, and it was filmed six days later, on October 20.

== Plot ==
After a month and a half of procrastination, Jerry and George still have no ideas for their pilot order to present to NBC the next day. Jerry spots Marla, a professional organizer he almost dated. Marla is now single because her boyfriend never returned from the fall of the Berlin Wall celebrations.

George impresses Marla's friend by boasting about writing for NBC, but Jerry warns that Susan is officially his girlfriend—since they go out Saturday nights by default, and George now has Tampax at home. George is tempted to leave Susan so he can take advantage of having an impressive job to meet women, but Jerry reminds him of the rich irony that he will have no job without Susan on their side at NBC. George fantasizes that he could get out scot-free by hooking up Susan with David Letterman, whom she is enamored with.

Jerry has Marla over for a consultation, but must kick out Kramer, who is freeloading off of Jerry's TV after giving away his own TV to George. Marla confides that her virginity would have ended her last relationship. Elaine openly talks up the usefulness of her own diaphragm in front of Marla, who awkwardly excuses herself. Fearing offense, Elaine educates Marla about sex, starting with the expectation that men will make excuses to leave right after sex.

Jerry and George order Chinese food for a last-ditch writing session, and also for Kramer. George suggests a story where an uninsured indigent driver wrecks his car, and gets sentenced as his indentured butler. Ping the delivery boy crashes his bike to avoid Elaine, and only Kramer's order survives. The writing session is hopelessly derailed with the injured Ping blaming Elaine, Kramer watching TV, and George having nothing to eat.

George comes up with sob stories to postpone the meeting, but runs off after David Letterman, leaving Jerry to meet the NBC executives alone and empty-handed. The executives are unimpressed by Jerry's improvised idea of waiting for a table at a Chinese restaurant for an entire episode, but he wins them over by falling back on George's butler story.

George joins the meeting and openly kisses Susan. Susan gets fired, and berates George for his indiscretion, but George is secretly ecstatic because the NBC deal no longer hinges on their relationship. Jerry reminds him that he is obligated to support Susan first, having ruined her life.

Elaine's advice complicates Jerry's romance with Marla, but Elaine, facing a lawsuit from Ping, demands that Jerry keep Marla available to testify. Meanwhile, Susan has dumped George, freeing him to chat up women, but they look down on him for writing a sitcom.

== Production ==
"The Virgin" was written by Peter Mehlman, and co-written by the Farrelly brothers, who went on to write and direct such comedies as Dumb and Dumber, There's Something About Mary, Shallow Hal, and Stuck on You. This episode introduced the character Marla. She also appears in the next episode, "The Contest", and has cameos in "The Pilot" and "The Finale". Jackie Swanson and Dedee Pfeiffer were additional actresses who auditioned for the role.

In the episode, Jerry pitches the idea of an episode where all the main characters are doing is waiting for a table in a Chinese restaurant. This is an inside joke, pertaining to when Jerry Seinfeld and Larry David proposed season two's "The Chinese Restaurant". This left the real-life executives of NBC indifferent, as was the case when the idea was proposed in this episode. Bob Balaban (who plays Russell Dalrymple) was supposed to appear in this scene, but the role was written out due to a scheduling conflict. It is explained in the episode that Russell had to deal with "a problem on the set of Blossom."

In a deleted scene, Jerry gives his own TV to Kramer to put an end to his freeloading.

The scene when George says "every time I think I'm out, they pull me back in!" is the same line spoken by Michael Corleone in The Godfather Part III.

== Reception ==
Over 16 million people viewed this episode. It gained an 11.6 Nielsen Rating and a 17 audience share, meaning that 11.6% of American households watched the episode, and 17% of all televisions in use at the time were tuned into it.
