= The Opera (Seinfeld) =

- Seinfeld episode
- Episode no.: Season 4 Episode 9
- Directed by: Tom Cherones
- Written by: Larry Charles
- Production code: 409
- Original air date: November 4, 1992

Guest appearances
- Peter Crombie as 'Crazy' Joe Davola; Heidi Swedberg as Susan Ross; Bill Saluga as Opera Usher; Ross Evans as Mr. Reichman; Harriett S. Miller as Mrs. Reichman

Episode chronology
← Previous "The Cheever Letters"	Next → "The Virgin"
- Seinfeld season 4

"The Opera" is the 49th episode of the sitcom Seinfeld. It is the ninth episode of the fourth season. It aired on November 4, 1992 on NBC. In this episode, while attending Pagliacci at the opera, Kramer and George's ticket scalping hustle leaves Jerry and Elaine at the mercy of the vengeful "Crazy" Joe Davola.

== Plot ==
"Crazy" Joe Davola, having become paranoid that Jerry cost him a deal with NBC, ominously threatens over voicemail to "put the kibosh" on Jerry. Kramer has procured opening night opera tickets for the group to see Luciano Pavarotti in Pagliacci, but stipulates that Jerry must attend, as "the straw that stirs the drink". Elaine plans to bring Davola, still not knowing he is mentally ill. Jerry looks forward to meeting her mystery boyfriend "Joey".

Jerry and Kramer panic hysterically upon hearing Davola's message so Jerry calls the police, but to no avail.

Elaine visits Davola's apartment for the first time, unannounced, where she finds Davola's obsessive shrine of voyeuristic photos of herself. Davola is imperturbably oblivious to Elaine's apprehension, until she calls off the opera. Confusing Elaine with Nedda from Pagliacci, he recalls how Nedda was killed for hiding her infidelity. Elaine escapes Davola by using Binaca as makeshift mace spray.

George's opera attire is a too-small tuxedo that he has not worn since a wedding six years ago, when the father of the bride headlocked him and threw him out for cursing during a toast. Jerry envies Kramer dressing down, not up, but George demands that Jerry suffer with him. With Elaine attending alone and Susan dropping out, Kramer decides to scalp the two leftover tickets, and George is enticed by the lucrative prospect. However, they find no takers for their exorbitant asking prices. George is recognized by the father of the bride from the wedding, who headlocks him for illegal scalping.

Davola heads to the opera in full Pagliaccio costume and makeup, easily dispatching some hecklers on the way. He unsettles Kramer, who is still not over a childhood fear of clowns.

Jerry and Elaine are left waiting without tickets, and they finally realize in horror that their respective stalkers are one and the same. When Davola finds them, they mistake him for a similarly-costumed street performer until Elaine smells her Binaca on Davola. Kramer finally brings their tickets, allowing Jerry and Elaine to flee into the theater.

George finally undercuts himself enough to close a deal when Susan arrives, free to attend after all. With George distracted, the buyer underpays him.

Kramer, Elaine, Jerry, George's buyer, and Susan all take their seats, George having bowed out to hide his scalping. Jerry and Elaine realize they are not out of the woods when they learn Kramer sold his ticket to a clown.

== Production ==
The scene when Jerry and another audience member start arguing and tearing dollar bills is a reference to a similar scene in the film Broadway Danny Rose.

In segments deleted from George's ticket-scalping scene, he discovers that the seat of his tuxedo pants has split, then uses this as an excuse to back out of the opera. He also notices, too late, the buyer cheating him.
