= The Stall =

- Seinfeld episode
- Episode no.: Season 5 Episode 12
- Directed by: Tom Cherones
- Written by: Larry Charles
- Production code: 512
- Original air date: January 6, 1994

Guest appearances
- Jami Gertz as Jane; Dan Cortese as Tony

Episode chronology
← Previous "The Conversion"	Next → "The Dinner Party"
- Seinfeld season 5

"The Stall" is the 76th episode of the NBC sitcom Seinfeld. It is the 12th episode of the fifth season, and first aired on January 6, 1994. In this episode, Jerry's girlfriend Jane refuses to share toilet paper with Elaine from the next stall over; Kramer suspects Jane is a phone sex operator; and Elaine dates a "mimbo" who gets injured while rock climbing with George and Kramer.

== Plot ==
Elaine and Jerry, at a movie with their respective dates Tony and Jane, fail to meet up. Elaine and Jane sit in neighboring bathroom stalls. Elaine has no toilet paper, but Jane refuses her pleadings to "spare a square" or even one ply, and leaves Elaine to her fate. After hearing both Jane and Elaine vent over the incident, Jerry connects the dots. Since Elaine only knows Jane by her "flinty" voice, Jerry is wary of their upcoming double date together.

Meanwhile, Kramer uses Jerry's phone to prank call a phone sex line as "Andre". Jerry thinks the operator, "Erica", sounds familiar, and is perturbed when Kramer also calls Jane's voice "flinty".

Elaine denies that she is superficial for dating Tony, who is an airheaded hunk—a "mimbo"—and an adrenaline junkie. George has become Tony's groupie, copying his backwards baseball cap and looking for any excuse to hang out. He eagerly offers to make sandwiches to go rock climbing together, but becomes jealous when Kramer also gets invited. Everyone treats George like he has a schoolgirl crush as he gushes over being friends with a "cool guy".

Halfway up a rock face, Kramer fearlessly rappels around George, who is frozen in terror and clings to Kramer's leg. Kramer makes George yodel for comfort, and also secure Tony's belay rope, but George lets go while getting a sandwich for Tony. Tony falls and lands face-first on a rock.

Jane refuses to spare a napkin for Jerry while eating. Jerry urgently makes Jane chew too many pieces of gum to muffle her voice to Elaine; he claims that this makes Jane too eccentric for the double date. After Kramer and George sheepishly break the bad news, Elaine finds Tony's face heavily bandaged, and desperately probes whether he will suffer deformities. Elaine does not let George in to apologize, and Tony cuts him loose. Luckily for Jerry, the double date is called off.

Kramer meets Jane, and is sure that her voice is "Erica"'s. At Monk's, Elaine admits that she only cares about Tony's looks, but wonders if she can learn the true meaning of love after all. As Kramer waits for "Erica" to meet him in person, Jane arrives. Jerry jumps to conclusions, offending Jane, but Elaine recognizes Jane's voice when she refuses to spare any tissue. Elaine beats Jane to the bathroom and steals all the toilet paper, then triumphantly refuses Jane's begging from the next stall.

After extricating herself, Jane dumps Jerry and also Kramer—in "Erica"'s voice.

== Production ==
Larry Charles got the idea for the toilet paper argument from a Dear Abby letter. Actor Michael Richards said the episode contained one of his biggest regrets from Seinfeld. Immediately after filming, he realized that the rock climbing scene had great potential for physical comedy, which his performance neglected to tap into.

The resolution to Tony's story was deleted before broadcast: Elaine is relieved that Tony's face came through unscathed, but, while rock climbing, he notices a pimple on her face and dumps her, then leaves. Unable to descend by herself, Elaine begins desperately yodeling.
