= The Pilot (Seinfeld) =

- Seinfeld episodes
- Episode nos.: Season 4 Episodes 23/24
- Directed by: Tom Cherones
- Written by: Larry David
- Production code: 423/424
- Original air date: May 20, 1993
- Running time: 42 minutes

Guest appearances
- Bob Balaban as Russell; Peter Crombie as Joe Davola; Richard Gant as Fred; Larry Hankin as Tom Pepper (Kramer); Elena Wohl as Sandi Robbins (Elaine); Jeremy Piven as Michael Barth (George); Mariska Hargitay as Melissa Shannon; Gina Hecht as Dana Foley; Bruce Jarchow as Doctor; Kevin Page as Stu; Al Ruscio as New Coffee Shop Manager; Anne Twomey as Rita Kearson; Laura Waterbury as Casting Director; Larry David as Man on Raft #1; Larry Charles as Man on Raft #2 (uncredited); Tom Cherones as the Pilot Director (uncredited)

Episode chronology
← Previous "The Handicap Spot"	Next → "The Mango"
- Seinfeld season 4

"The Pilot" is the two-part season finale of the fourth season of the American sitcom Seinfeld. It is the 23rd and 24th episode of the fourth season and the 63rd and 64th episode overall. It was written by series co-creator Larry David and directed by Tom Cherones, and originally aired on NBC on May 20, 1993.

The two-part episode aired at an earlier time, 8:00 p.m., to leave room for the two-hour series finale of Cheers, whose timeslot was subsequently claimed by Seinfeld at the start of the 1993-94 season in September 1993.

About 32 million people watched both parts of "The Pilot" when it initially aired. An additional 2 million watched the first part but not the second, and 3 million more watched the second part but not the first.

== Plot ==
=== Part 1 ===
Kramer still wants to play himself in Jerry's sitcom, and he and Jerry improvise unfunny lines and stilted laughter in response. Jerry and George nervously wait to hear from NBC as auditions for their pilot draw near.

Despite having only gone out with Elaine once, NBC president Russell Dalrymple calls her for two months. Elaine finally meets to let him down, suggesting that she would rather he worked for a cause like Greenpeace instead of in TV. Dalrymple tries to intrigue her with George's "show about nothing" pitch.

Jerry criticizes George for socially "giving up" by wearing sweatpants out. NBC's call comes in while Kramer is taking his own calls on Jerry's phone. Jerry is elated for George's success, but George, at therapy with Dana, fears that success will bring down divine retribution upon him. Dana notices a white discoloration on his upper lip, and he blames her for making his paranoia worse.

"Crazy" Joe Davola, now a squeegee man, menaces George and Jerry during their taxi ride to 30 Rockefeller Plaza.

A bald, depressing man in sweatpants gets George's role. Jerry and George immediately choose an attractive woman to play Elaine. Numerous Kramer candidates enter in his flamboyant style; one delivers an uncanny performance, but a box of raisins goes missing after he leaves. The real Kramer arrives incognito, but diarrhea cuts his audition short, and he dashes all through Manhattan in search of a public restroom. He gets mugged in Central Park, then ends up constipated from holding it in too long.

To George's horror, others notice the white discoloration, and his doctor, perplexed, orders a biopsy. On edge that the doctor did not dismiss his fears about cancer out of hand, George plans to die "without dignity".

"Elaine" wants to get in character through intimacy with Jerry, while "Kramer" is hostile to the real Kramer's unsolicited suggestions.

Dalrymple never shows up to the audition, and Elaine worries about him. At Monk's, under new management, Jerry notices that every waitress has a shapely bust. Elaine plans to bust the café for discrimination, preparing ample references to apply for a job wearing a plain outfit. Turned down, Elaine promptly reports the many well-endowed waitresses to the Equal Employment Opportunity Commission.

=== Part 2 ===
At rehearsal, George makes an enemy of "Kramer" by offering unsolicited suggestions, then asking after the missing raisins. Jerry, playing himself, gets singled out by NBC executive Rita as the weak link in the show because he can't act. "Elaine", no longer answering to her real name, "breaks up" with Jerry for authenticity. Dalrymple, still heartbroken, gets rejected again over the phone and fires a hapless assistant in a furious rant.

Still constipated after many remedies, Kramer skips the pilot taping, buying and administering an enema in great trepidation. Elaine attends with a wig to avoid Dalrymple, but an old acquaintance easily recognizes her. "George" panics over forgetting his lines. The real George's burden is finally lifted when the biopsy results come back negative, but he digs himself deeper with "Kramer" over the raisins. Dalrymple is still missing as the taping starts, when Davola, with a cry of "Sic semper tyrannis!", throws himself at Jerry.

Despite this disruption, the Jerry pilot airs as planned, with various scenes reprising dialogue from the actual show. Jerry hosts a group watch, and finds that Morty's missing wallet was in his couch all along. Many characters from season 4 also watch and react: Susan and Allison, Marla and Kennedy Jr., "the Drake" and ex-fiancée Allison, and "Sal Bass" and Sidra are all revealed to be together.

The group is triumphant to find the pilot actually funny. Rita, who has replaced Dalrymple due to his disappearance, immediately calls Jerry and drops the show without hesitation. Jerry and George blame Elaine for driving Dalrymple off to who-knows-where.

At Monk's, the entire EEOC office has descended to patronize, rather than investigate, the café. Elaine indignantly confronts the man in charge of hiring, but discovers that all the waitresses are his daughters. George prepares to look for a new job.

Somewhere at sea, Dalrymple has joined a Greenpeace anti-whaling campaign, confronting a whaling ship and dodging harpoons in an inflatable boat to impress Elaine. Dalrymple falls overboard and is lost, as his fellow activists swear to tell Elaine of his bravery.

== Production ==
The character of Russell Dalrymple, played by Bob Balaban, is based on NBC executive Warren Littlefield. In 1996, Balaban was cast as Littlefield in the HBO movie, The Late Shift.

Numerous guest stars from previous episodes of Seinfeld made cameos in the episode, watching and commentating on Jerry's pilot as it airs, specifically Brian Doyle-Murray as Mel Sanger, Tony Amendola as Salman Rushdie, Teri Hatcher as Sidra Holland, Jon Hayman as Donald Sanger, Nicholas Hormann as Calvin Klein, Jennifer Campbell as Tia Van Camp, Bill Erwin as Sid Fields, Wayne Knight as Newman, Jane Leeves as Marla Penny, Barney Martin as Morty Seinfeld, Liz Sheridan as Helen Seinfeld, Rick Overton as The Drake, Elizabeth Dennehy as The Drakette, Heidi Swedberg as Susan Ross, and Ping Wu as Ping.
