= Jane Leeves =

British actress

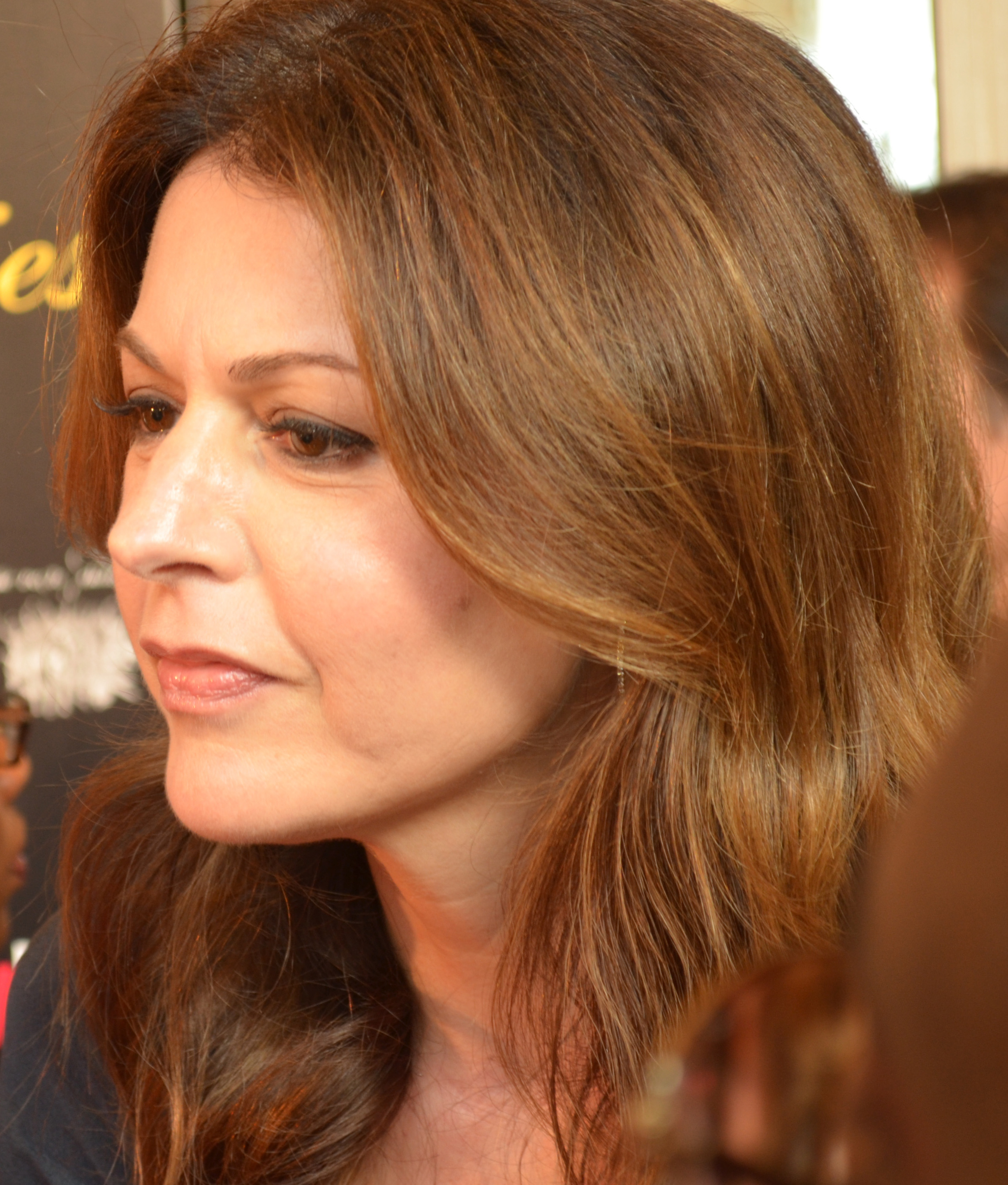
- Leeves in 2012
- Born: Jane Elizabeth Leeves; 18 April 1961 (age 65); Ilford, Essex, England
- Occupation: Actress
- Years active: 1981–present
- Spouse: Marshall Coben (m. 1996)
- Children: 2

Jane Elizabeth Leeves (born 18 April 1961) is an English actress, best known for her role as Daphne Moon on the NBC sitcom Frasier (1993–2004), for which she was nominated for an Emmy Award for Outstanding Supporting Actress in a Comedy Series at the 50th Primetime Emmy Awards and a Golden Globe Award for Best Supporting Actress in a Series, Miniseries or Television Film at the 52nd Golden Globe Awards. She also played Joy Scroggs on TV Land's sitcom Hot in Cleveland.

Leeves made her screen debut with a small role in 1983 on the British television comedy programme The Benny Hill Show, and appeared as a dancer in Monty Python's The Meaning of Life. She moved to the United States, where she performed in small roles. From 1986 to 1988, she played her first leading character in the sitcom Throb, then secured brief recurring parts in the sitcoms Seinfeld and Murphy Brown. She was cast in films such as Miracle on 34th Street (1994), James and the Giant Peach (1996), Music of the Heart (1999) and The Event (2003). In 2018, she began appearing in the Fox medical drama The Resident.

== Career ==
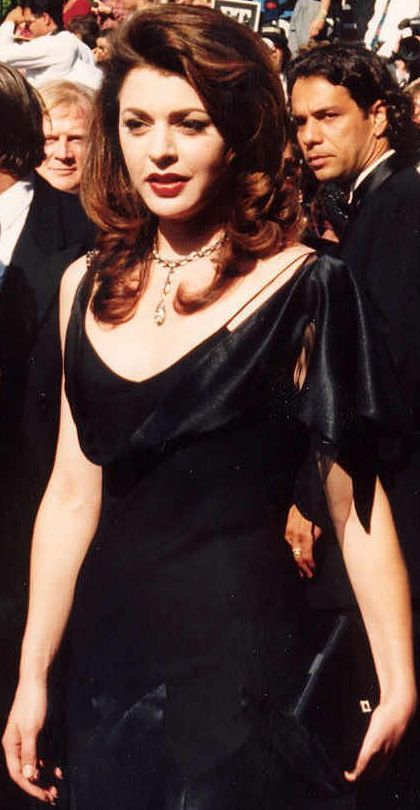
Leeves at the 1994 Emmys

The daughter of an engineer and a nurse, Jane Leeves was born in Ilford, Essex, England. She was raised in East Grinstead, Sussex, along with two sisters and a brother. She was a regular on The Benny Hill Show, in the dance troupe Hill's Angels. She made use of her experience as a dancer in a scene in the 1983 film Monty Python's The Meaning of Life. In the US, she appeared as a tourist with a baby in the video for David Lee Roth's song "California Girls", but struggled for several years to establish an acting career.

She had a recurring role in the television series Murphy Brown as Audrey Cohen, the smart but awkward girlfriend of producer Miles Silverberg (played by Grant Shaud). She also appeared as the troublesome virgin Marla Penny in four episodes of Seinfeld: "The Virgin", "The Contest", "The Pilot" and "The Finale – Part 2". During this period, Leeves was cast as Holly for the pilot of the American version of the science-fiction comedy Red Dwarf.

In 1993, Leeves joined the cast of the television series Frasier as the eccentric, forthright and psychic Mancunian Daphne Moon. By the start of the eighth season, Leeves was pregnant, and the writers incorporated her pregnancy into shows as weight gain due to her character's stress from her relationship with Niles Crane (portrayed by David Hyde Pierce). By the conclusion of Frasier, Leeves had been nominated for a Primetime Emmy Award for Outstanding Supporting Actress in a Comedy Series at the 50th Primetime Emmy Awards in 1998, and a Golden Globe Award for Best Supporting Actress – Series, Miniseries or Television Film at the 52nd Golden Globe Awards in 1995.

Appearing less frequently in cinema, Leeves lent her speaking and singing voices to the animated film James and the Giant Peach (1996) as Mrs. Ladybug, and appeared in Music of the Heart (1999). In 2002, she appeared in the Broadway musical Cabaret. In 2004, she hosted an episode of the television comedy quiz show Have I Got News for You. Her 2006 show, The WB's sitcom Misconceptions, went unaired.

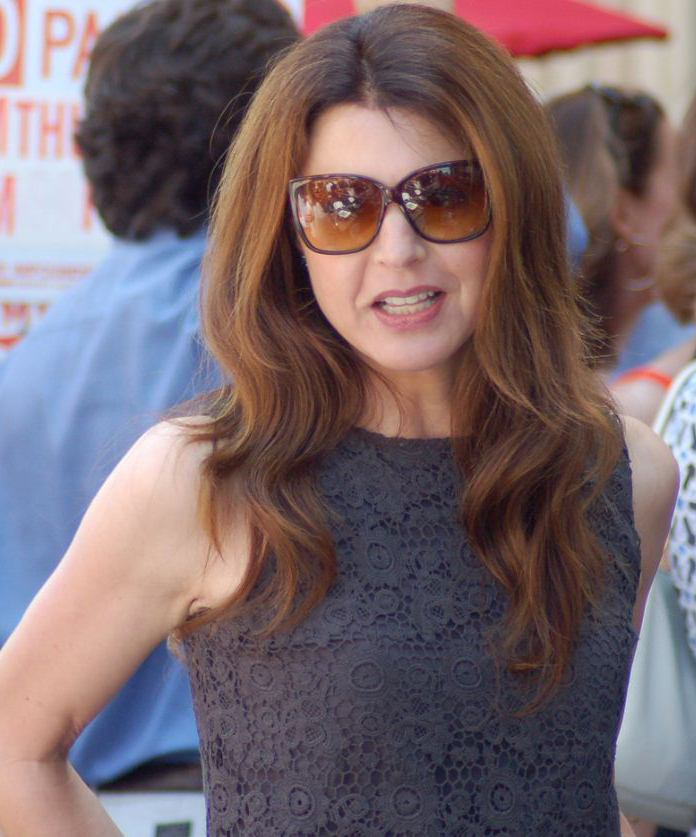
Leeves in August 2012

Leeves provided guest vocals in The Penguins of Madagascar as Lulu, a female chimp with whom Phil fell in love. With her Frasier costar Peri Gilpin, Leeves also set up the production company Bristol Cities (cockney rhyming slang for 'titties'). Their last project was in 2007, a pilot for a US remake of the British sitcom The Vicar of Dibley titled The Minister of Divine with Kirstie Alley in the title role. In 2010, Leeves guest starred in two episodes in ABC's Desperate Housewives as Lynette Scavo (Felicity Huffman)'s and Tom Scavo (Doug Savant)'s therapist Dr. Graham.

From 2010 until 2015, Leeves played the 40-something ex-"eyebrow artist to the stars" Joy Scroggs in the TV Land comedy Hot in Cleveland, with Valerie Bertinelli, Wendie Malick (also her co-star in the final season of Frasier) and Betty White. In 2011, she was nominated Screen Actors Guild Award for Outstanding Performance by an Ensemble in a Comedy Series with the rest of the cast at the 17th Screen Actors Guild Awards. The series ended in 2015 after six seasons and 128 episodes. She returned to television in 2018 with her first regular role in a dramatic series, orthopaedic surgeon Kit Voss, in the Fox medical drama The Resident.

== Personal life ==
Leeves is married to Marshall Coben, a CBS Studios executive, with whom she has two children, a daughter and a son. Peri Gilpin, Leeves's co-star on Frasier, is her neighbour and close friend and was in the delivery room when Leeves's first child was born.

In season 8 episode 17 of Frasier, "It Takes Two to Tangle", Niles Crane – Frasier's brother – tells Gilpin's character that Leeves's character has lost 9 lb 12 oz (4.4 kg) at the health spa, which is a reference to the actual weight of Leeves's baby girl.

== Filmography ==
=== Film ===
Year	Title	Role	Notes
1981	Nice to See You	Performer	Television film
1983	Monty Python's The Meaning of Life	Dancer	Uncredited
1983	The Hunger	None	Uncredited
1985	To Live and Die in L.A.	Serena	Credited as Jane Leaves
1992	Just Deserts	Amy Phillips	
1994	Mr. Write	Wylie	
1994	Miracle on 34th Street	Alberta Leonard	
1996	James and the Giant Peach	Mrs. Ladybug	Voice
1996	Pandora's Clock	Rachel Sherwood	Television film
1996	The Great War and the Shaping of the 20th Century	Caroline Webb	Voice
1999	Don't Go Breaking My Heart	Juliet Gosling	
1999	Music of the Heart	Dorothea von Haeften	
2002	The Adventures of Tom Thumb and Thumbelina	Margaret Beetle	Voice role
2003	The Event	Mona Rothschild	
2006	Garfield: A Tail of Two Kitties	Eenie	Voice
2009	National Lampoon's Endless Bummer	Liv	
2012	Eric Idle's What About Dick	Emma Schlegel	

=== Television ===
Year	Title	Role	Notes
1983–1985	The Benny Hill Show	Hill's Angel	4 episodes
1986–1988	Throb	Prudence Anne "Blue" Bartlett	Main role
1987	Murder, She Wrote	Gwen Petrie	Episode "It Runs in the Family"
1989	It's a Living	Terry Tedaldo	Episode "I Never Sang for My Father"
1989	Mr. Belvedere	Professor Ann Burns	Episode "The Professor"
1989	Hooperman	Annie	Episode "Stakeout"
1989–1993	Murphy Brown	Audrey Cohen	Nine episodes
1990	My Two Dads	Harriet	Episode "See You in September?"
1990	Room for Romance		Episode "A Midsummer Night's Reality"
1990	Who's the Boss?	Ms. Adams	Episode "Parental Guidance Suggested"
1991	Blossom	Sheila	Episode "Love Stinks"
1992	Red Dwarf USA	Holly	Unsold
1992–1998	Seinfeld	Marla Penny	Four episodes
1993–2004	Frasier	Daphne Moon	Main role; 264 episodes
1995	Caroline in the City	Daphne Moon	Episode "Caroline and the Bad Back"
1998	Hercules	Athena	Six episodes
2003	The Simpsons	Edwina	Voice, episode "The Regina Monologues"
2004	Have I Got News For You	Guest Presenter	One episode
2006	Misconceptions	Amanda Watson	Seven episodes
2006	Twenty Good Years	Mary Frances	Episode "Big Love"
2008	The Starter Wife	Ann Hefton	Two episodes
2009–2011	The Penguins of Madagascar	Lulu	Voice, two episodes
2009–2013	Phineas and Ferb	Various characters	Four episodes
2010	Desperate Housewives	Dr. Graham	Two episodes
2010	Notes from the Underbelly	Gracie	Episode "Accidental Family Bed"
2010–2015	Hot in Cleveland	Joy Scroggs	Main role
2016	Crowded	Gwen	Episode "The Fixer"
2016	Lego Star Wars: The Freemaker Adventures	Lt. Estoc	Voice, two episodes
2017	The Great Indoors	Cheryl	Episode "Roland's Secret"
2017–2019	Mickey and the Roadster Racers	Queen of England, Babette Beagle	Voice, four episodes
2018	We Bare Bears	Ari Curd	Voice, episode "Googs"
2018–2023	The Resident	Dr. Kitt Voss	Series regular

== Awards and nominations ==
Year	Award	Category	Work	Result
1994	Viewers for Quality Television	Best Supporting Actress in a Quality Comedy Series	Frasier	Nominated
1995	Golden Globe Awards	Best Supporting Actress – Series, Miniseries or Television Film	Frasier	Nominated
1995	Screen Actors Guild Awards	Outstanding Ensemble in a Comedy Series	Frasier	Nominated
1995	Viewers for Quality Television	Best Supporting Actress in a Quality Comedy Series	Frasier	Won
1996	Screen Actors Guild Awards	Outstanding Ensemble in a Comedy Series	Frasier	Nominated
1997	Screen Actors Guild Awards	Outstanding Ensemble in a Comedy Series	Frasier	Nominated
1997	Viewers for Quality Television	Best Supporting Actress in a Quality Comedy Series	Frasier	Nominated
1998	Primetime Emmy Awards	Outstanding Supporting Actress in a Comedy Series	Frasier	Nominated
1998	Screen Actors Guild Awards	Outstanding Ensemble in a Comedy Series	Frasier	Nominated
1998	Viewers for Quality Television	Best Supporting Actress in a Quality Comedy Series	Frasier	Nominated
1999	Screen Actors Guild Awards	Outstanding Ensemble in a Comedy Series	Frasier	Nominated
1999	Viewers for Quality Television	Best Supporting Actress in a Quality Comedy Series	Frasier	Nominated
2000	Satellite Awards	Best Actress – Television Series Musical or Comedy	Frasier	Nominated
2000	Screen Actors Guild Awards	Outstanding Ensemble in a Comedy Series	Frasier	Won
2000	Viewers for Quality Television	Best Supporting Actress in a Quality Comedy Series	Frasier	Nominated
2001	Screen Actors Guild Awards	Outstanding Ensemble in a Comedy Series	Frasier	Nominated
2002	Screen Actors Guild Awards	Outstanding Ensemble in a Comedy Series	Frasier	Nominated
2003	Screen Actors Guild Awards	Outstanding Ensemble in a Comedy Series	Frasier	Nominated
2004	Satellite Awards	Best Supporting Actress – Television Series	Frasier	Nominated
2004	Screen Actors Guild Awards	Outstanding Ensemble in a Comedy Series	Frasier	Nominated
2011	Screen Actors Guild Awards	Outstanding Ensemble in a Comedy Series	Hot in Cleveland	Nominated
