= The Outing =

- Seinfeld episode
- Episode no.: Season 4 Episode 17
- Directed by: Tom Cherones
- Written by: Larry Charles
- Production code: 416
- Original air date: February 11, 1993

Guest appearances
- Liz Sheridan as Helen Seinfeld; Barney Martin as Morty Seinfeld; Estelle Harris as Estelle Costanza; Paula Marshall as Sharon; Kari Coleman as Allison; Anthony Mangano as Marine; Ben Reed as Male Nurse; Lawrence Mandley as Manager

Episode chronology
← Previous "The Shoes"	Next → "The Old Man"
- Seinfeld season 4

"The Outing" is the 57th episode of the sitcom Seinfeld. First aired on February 11, 1993 on NBC, it is the 17th episode of the fourth season. In this episode, a journalism student reports on Jerry and George's close companionship, which becomes understood as the two of them coming out. The line "... not that there's anything wrong with that"—as a reference to homosexuality—has become a popular catchphrase among fans.

== Plot ==
George's attempt to break up with his girlfriend, Allison, makes her suicidal, trapping him in the relationship.

At Monk's Café, Sharon, a journalism grad student at New York University, misses her scheduled interview with Jerry; they sit back-to-back without recognizing each other. Elaine notices Sharon eavesdropping on her conversation with Jerry and George, and loudly exhorts the two to come out of the closet as a prank. Sharon not only hears this, but also watches Jerry and George go to the men's room together. Jerry complains that he has always been pegged as gay for being "single", "thin", and "neat".

The interview is rescheduled at Jerry's apartment, where Sharon recognizes Jerry and George from Monk's. Sharon sees Jerry and George bicker like an old married couple, and learns that the two met during roughhousing in gym class. Jerry and George finally recognize Sharon and realize she is writing about their companionship. They futilely deny being gay, while disavowing any homophobia with "not that there's anything wrong with that".

Kramer gives Jerry a two-line phone as an early birthday gift, unknowingly upstaging Elaine, who bought the same thing. Sharon and George call Jerry at the same time on the new phone. Sharon is about to drop the gay angle for her article, and Jerry relievedly switches lines to tell George, in a mock-conspiratorial tone. He discovers too late that the phone is defective, and both lines can hear each other. Elaine visits Sharon to explain the misunderstanding, but Sharon is antagonized by Elaine refusing to take off her winter coat indoors.

Not only does NYU publish Sharon's article on Jerry and George, but major newspapers pick up the story. In the aftermath, Jerry and George are confronted by Kramer and their parents. Kramer reels upon realizing he and Jerry both fit the gay stereotype. Helen blames herself for buying Jerry culottes as a child. George finds his mother in the hospital after the report made her throw her back out again, but he is transfixed by a sponge-bathing patient and nurse—both men this time—casting erotic silhouettes on a divider curtain. Despite all this, everyone concurs "not that there's anything wrong with that".

After a uniformed military man thanks Jerry for inspiring him to come out, Jerry turns down George's birthday gift of tickets to Guys and Dolls on Broadway. George uses the article as his excuse to finally break up with Allison, but Allison demands proof that he and Jerry are together.

Sharon is seduced by Jerry and recants her reporting, but George, with Allison, bursts in on them making out. George's excuse falls apart as he pretends to fight for Jerry's affection, driving Sharon to walk out. George backpedals and claims to be a porn actor instead, only to earn Allison's approval. Kramer passes through, accompanied by an attractive young man, who turns out to be from the phone company.

== Production ==
The cast recall that, after the initial table read, they were inclined to drop this episode from production, as the tone came off as vilifying homosexuality. Discussing the matter with Seinfeld, Larry Charles said "not that there's anything wrong with that" in reference to being gay. Seinfeld was inspired to sprinkle this disclaimer throughout the entire script, and personally demonstrated the comedic rhythm for speaking the line; he credits Charles's comment for saving the episode.

A deleted scene shows Sharon becoming gradually more and more aggrieved by Elaine's winter coat.

== Reception ==
The episode received positive reception from the gay community on broadcast, winning a GLAAD Media Award (Gay & Lesbian Alliance Against Defamation) for Outstanding Comedy Episode. Conversely, in 2023, Vulture retrospectively declared it the second-worst episode of the series (after “The Puerto Rican Day”), stating it "wholeheartedly embraces gay panic as a plot device to a nonsensical, largely unfunny degree".
