= Jennifer Campbell (actress) =

American television actress (born 1967)

Jennifer Lynn Campbell
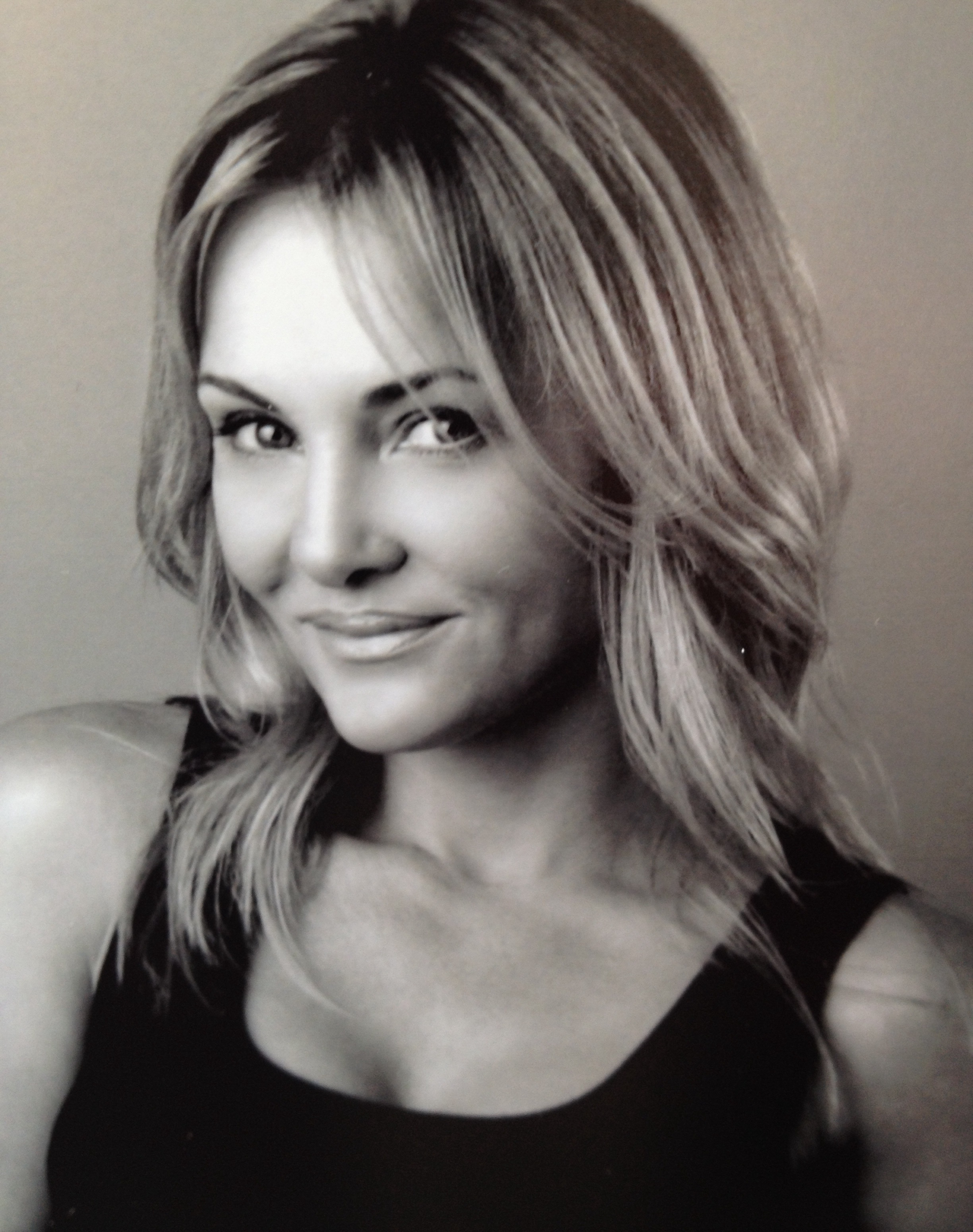
- Born: Jennifer Lynn Campbell; October 3, 1967 (age 58); Bay City, Michigan
- Other names: Jen Campbell
- Occupation(s): Actress, beauty pageant titleholder

Jennifer Lynn Campbell (born October 3, 1967) is an American actress and beauty pageant titleholder. She is best known for her television appearances on Baywatch and Seinfeld in the 1990s. She had a lead role as Annie Beckett on the drama television series Robin's Hoods (1994–1995), created by Aaron Spelling.

== Early life ==
Campbell was born on October 3, 1967, in Bay City, Michigan.

== Career ==
She won the Miss Hawaiian Tropic International beauty contest in 1989. In 1992, she made a guest appearance on the action drama series Baywatch as motorcyclist Jessie Majors, and returned to play the role for the show's fourth season. In 1998, she became the third actress to portray Neely Capshaw on season nine of Baywatch. She also portrayed Claire in an episode of the show's spin-off Baywatch Nights.

Campbell is also known for her roles as Tia Van Camp in Seinfeld and as Loni on Boy Meets World. She had guest roles in numerous television shows, including High Tide, Veronica's Closet, Diagnosis Murder, Frasier, Night Man, Soldier of Fortune, Inc. and Clueless.

She had a main role as former burglar, Annie Beckett, in the television series Robin's Hoods, created by Aaron Spelling. The show aired from August 22, 1994, until March 13, 1995.

== Filmography ==
Film and television
Year	Title	Role	Notes
1990	Dan Turner, Hollywood Detective	Ballantyne's Mistress	Film
1992	Lady Boss	Beauty #2	
1992	Silk Stalkings	Cheryl Williams	Episode: "The Queen Is Dead"
1992–93	Seinfeld	Tia Van Camp	3 episodes
1992–94	Baywatch	Jessie Majors	Episodes: "Point Doom" and "Second Time Around"
1998–99	Baywatch	Neely Capshaw	Recurring role; 4 episodes
1993	Blood Warriors	Karen Stone	Film
1994	Car Trouble, Darlin'	Susan Anne	Short film
1994	Animal Instincts II	Mary	Film
1994	The Gift	Salesgirl in Bookstore	Television film
1994–95	Robin's Hoods	Annie Beckett	Main role; 22 episodes
1995	High Tide	Heather Landis	Episode: "Bikini Patrol"
1995	Ding Dong	Honey Kick	Short film
1996	Diagnosis Murder	Darlene Mix	Episode: "35 Millimeter Murder"
1996	White Cargo	Jessica	Film
1996	Frasier	Sharon	Episode: "Love Bites Dog"
1996	Baywatch Nights	Claire	Episode: "The Rig"
1996–97	Boy Meets World	Loni	3 episodes
1997	Veronica's Closet	Tiffany	Episode: "Veronica's Husband Won't Leave"
1998	Night Man	Lorrie Swift / Night Woman	Episode: "Nightwoman"
1998	Clueless	Mrs. Schwartz	Episode: "Cashless"
1998	Soldier of Fortune, Inc.	Debbie	Episode: "Top Event"
2004	Untold Stories of the ER	Reenactment	Episode: "My Job Is Mayhem"
