= Elaine Benes =

Major character on the TV show "Seinfeld"

- Seinfeld character
- First appearance: "The Stake Out" (1990)
- Last appearance: Saturday Night Live (2016)
- Created by: Jerry Seinfeld; Larry David
- Portrayed by: Julia Louis-Dreyfus

In-universe information
- Alias: Susie
- Gender: Female
- Occupation: Copy writer/editor for the J. Peterman Catalog (seasons 6-9); Assistant to Justin Pitt (season 6); Editor at Pendant Publishing (seasons 1-5)
- Family: Alton Benes (father); Unnamed mother Gail Benes (sister); Grandma Mema (grandmother)
- Relatives: Holly (cousin); Pete (uncle) unnamed nephew
- Alma Mater: Tufts University

Elaine Marie Benes (/ˈbɛnɪs/) is a fictional character on the American television sitcom Seinfeld, played by former SNL cast member Julia Louis-Dreyfus. Elaine's best friend in the sitcom is her ex-boyfriend Jerry Seinfeld, and she is also good friends with George Costanza and Cosmo Kramer. Louis-Dreyfus received critical acclaim for her performance as Elaine, winning an Emmy, a Golden Globe and five SAG Awards. She reprised the role during season 41 of Saturday Night Live in 2016.

== Elaine's debut ==
Unlike her three close friends, Elaine is absent from the pilot episode. Previously the female role was supposed to be Claire, the waitress at Pete's Luncheonette played by Lee Garlington, but Monk's Cafe replaced the luncheonette and Garlington was dropped from the role. Elaine first appears in "The Stake Out", but in production order she appears in a final scene eating M&Ms in "Male Unbonding". NBC executives felt the show was too male-centric, and demanded that Jerry Seinfeld and Larry David add a woman to the cast as a condition for commissioning the show, as revealed in the commentary on the Season 1 and 2 DVD. In addition to the first episode, Elaine does not appear in "The Trip" (Louis-Dreyfus having been in the late stages of pregnancy at the time of filming) and therefore appears in fewer episodes than George and Jerry.

== Real-life inspiration ==
After it was discovered that Jerry Seinfeld once dated writer and comedian Carol Leifer, speculation grew that Elaine was based on Leifer, though that was later largely denied. Leifer, who wrote or co-wrote a number of episodes for the show, has said only some elements of the backstory of the character — that she and Seinfeld had dated and have remained good friends since the relationship ended — relate to her. Leifer has said some elements of the character of Elaine, especially her assertiveness, intelligence and sense of humor, are drawn from the off-screen personality of Julia Louis-Dreyfus herself. According to Jerry Seinfeld's biography (written by Jerry Oppenheimer), Elaine was based in part on Susan McNabb (who was dating Seinfeld when the character was created), though eventually named after friend and fellow comic Elayne Boosler. The character was also partially based on Monica Yates (daughter of novelist Richard Yates), whom Larry David once dated; they remained good friends after they broke up.

It has been reported that other actresses were in line to play the character, including Rosie O'Donnell, Megan Mullally, Jessica Lundy, Patricia Heaton, Mariska Hargitay, Wendie Malick and Amy Yasbeck.

On the DVD commentary for the season 1 episode "The Stakeout" Larry David says that Elaine was based on, "every ex-girlfriend [Jerry] and I ever had."

== Background and education ==
Unlike George, Jerry and Kramer, Elaine is not a native of New York City, having grown up in the affluent Baltimore suburb of Towson, and is shown to be a fan of the Baltimore Orioles. She attended finishing school and completed her undergraduate education at Tufts University, revealed to be her safety school in "The Puerto Rican Day", as a French literature major. In "The Dog", she tells George she moved to New York in 1986, which, by coincidence, is the year Jerry moved into his apartment across the hall from Kramer. She started dating Jerry later that year. In "The Doodle" it is stated by George that Elaine takes a drawing class at The New School with his girlfriend Paula.

Elaine's religious beliefs are never fully confirmed, and she appears to have little interest in religion. She expresses shock when Puddy is revealed as a devout Christian. She views saying "God bless you" as a "silly superstition" in "The Good Samaritan." It is strongly suggested in the show that Elaine is Catholic when she is seen making the sign of the cross before entering Jerry's apartment to retrieve a manuscript while the apartment is being fumigated in "The Doodle", and crosses herself again in "The Betrayal" after turning her back on a Hindu altar. Furthermore, in "The Pick", Elaine is horrified when she realizes she sent a Christmas card which features her nipple to "Sister Mary Catherine" and "Father Chelios". In multiple episodes, including "The Strong Box" and "The Wizard", she can be seen wearing a crucifix. In multiple episodes, including "The Soup", she is seen wearing cross earrings. In "The Postponement" and "The Fatigues", Elaine states that she is not Jewish.

== Family ==
Though her ethnicity is never made clear, the name Beneš is a common Czech surname. Her boyfriend incorrectly assumed that she was Hispanic in "The Wizard". In "The Wink", her cousin Holly repeatedly mentions a "Grandma Mema" who apparently shared a mutual dislike with Elaine's side of the family. Elaine claims to have an IQ of 145 (although her scores range from 85 to 151).

Elaine's father, a gruff novelist named Alton Benes (Lawrence Tierney), was featured in "The Jacket". In "The Wait Out", Elaine reveals to David Lookner that Alton left her and the rest of her family when she was nine years old. Elaine is the only main character in the series whose mother never makes an appearance.

Elaine has a sister, Gail, and a nephew. Her sister is first referenced in "The Phone Message" and specifically mentioned by name in "The Pick". In "The Airport", it is revealed that Gail lives in St. Louis. Her nephew was ten years old in "The Pick.” Elaine has a cousin, Holly, who appears in "The Wink", where reference is made to Elaine's grandmother Mema, from whom Holly inherited a set of cloth napkins. It is not revealed if Mema is her maternal or paternal grandmother.

In "The Stock Tip", Elaine mentions she has an Uncle Pete. In "The Secret Code", she mentions an uncle who worked in the Texas School Book Depository with Lee Harvey Oswald. Whether the two uncles are the same person is not revealed.

== Employment ==
During Seasons 2 to 5, Elaine works at Pendant Publishing under her boss Mr. Lippman, where she served as a copy editor. She loses her job at the end of Season 5 when the company goes bankrupt and a misunderstanding resulting from her penchant for chewy, speech-impairing Jujyfruit candies thwarts a merger that might have saved the company. ("The Opposite").

Elaine then becomes a personal assistant to the eccentric, demanding Justin Pitt, starting in "The Chaperone", but later is fired when Mr. Pitt thinks she and Jerry are conspiring to kill him in "The Diplomat's Club".

After meeting J. Peterman on the street in "The Understudy" in season 6, she becomes an editor at his J. Peterman Catalog, where she remains employed for the rest of the series. Starting in "The Foundation", she takes charge of the catalog when Peterman suffers a nervous breakdown and flees to Burma. Once Peterman returns in "The Money" she is demoted back to her former position. Peterman also fires her twice: first when her penchant for poppy seed muffins causes her to fail a drug test in "The Shower Head" and later in "The English Patient" when she expresses her hatred for the movie The English Patient. She is able to recover her job by agreeing to live temporarily in a remote cave in the desert of Tunisia.

== Personality ==
In "The Sponge", Elaine is desperate to buy a cache of discontinued contraceptive sponges before existing stock is exhausted. She coins the word "spongeworthy" debating her then-boyfriend's prospects of intimacy at the expense of her inventory.

In “The Cafe”, Elaine took an IQ test for George, who was worried about being embarrassed by the score. On her second attempt, she received a score of 151, a genius-level IQ.

In "The Stall", Elaine is dating Tony, a very good-looking athletic type. After a rock climbing accident mangles Tony's face, Elaine admits to Jerry that she cannot date somebody who is unattractive and wonders how long she is obligated to stay with him post-accident.

In "The Boyfriend", Elaine reveals her disgust for smokers, which leads to a breakup with Keith Hernandez. Her dislike of smoking also leads to an argument with a fortune-teller in "The Suicide". However, in "The Calzone", "The Blood" and "The Foundation" she is seen smoking a Cuban cigar.

Jerry reveals in the episode "The Pilot" that Elaine's favorite film is Shaft.

Elaine is a breathtakingly poor dancer. Her performance at a J. Peterman company party in "The Little Kicks" is described by George as "a full-bodied dry heave set to music." The moves are repeated in her bedroom in a short scene of "The Slicer". Both clips appear in part 1 of "The Clip Show".

=== Insecurities ===
In "The Andrea Doria", Elaine dates Alan, a "bad breaker-upper", who makes her feel insecure about having a big head. In the episode she describes herself as a "walking candy apple" after a bird flies into her "giant, freak head."

In "The Smelly Car", Elaine repulses her boyfriend Carl when her hair smells of body odor from riding in Jerry's car. She goes to extreme lengths to get the smell out but nothing works, and he continues to be grossed out.

In "The Postponement", Elaine confides in a rabbi that she is jealous of George's engagement to Susan Ross because George would be getting married before her and she considers George a loser. The Rabbi proceeds to tell everybody in Elaine's apartment complex and later on his cable TV show about her insecurity.

=== Influence/effect on others ===
In "The Chinese Woman", Jerry describes how Elaine's influence has had a destructive effect on her relationship with her friend Noreen. It is revealed that over the course of their friendship, Elaine has convinced Noreen to join the Army, then go AWOL, break up with one boyfriend for being a "high-talker", then later break up with another for being a "long-talker". Eventually, Kramer steps in and forbids Elaine to have any more contact with Noreen.

In "The Muffin Tops", Elaine convinces her ex-boss Mr. Lippman to start his own business selling just "muffin tops". However, they soon run into problems when no one will take the leftover stumps, and only by calling in "The Cleaner" (who turns out to be Newman) can they get rid of them.

In "The Non-Fat Yogurt", Elaine suggests to Lloyd Braun, an advisor to Mayor David Dinkins, that everybody in the city should wear name tags. Lloyd Braun suggests this idea to the mayor, who likes it so much that he adds it to his campaign, subsequently leading to his loss in the mayoral elections. In "The Gum", it's revealed that Lloyd Braun also loses his job and later has a nervous breakdown.

== Romantic relationships ==
=== Jerry Seinfeld ===
Jerry and Elaine dated for a while before the show started. They started dating in 1986 (as revealed in "The Truth") and dated until 1990. In "The Deal", Elaine states they only had sex 37 times. In "The Stakeout", Jerry tells his parents that the reason for the break-up had to do with fighting too much and "physical chemistry".

In "The Deal", Jerry and Elaine create a set of rules whereby they can be sexually intimate but remain only friends. However, their theory is ruined when Elaine is furious over Jerry giving her $182 as a birthday gift. In "The Mango", Jerry is shocked to discover that Elaine had feigned all her orgasms while they were together.

In "The Serenity Now", Jerry's uninhibited, exaggerated emotional state causes him to ask Elaine to marry him. Shocked, she makes an excuse and leaves. She returns later to accept his proposal, but Jerry has by that time settled to his usual stable emotional state and says "I don't see it happening." In "The Finale", when they think their airplane is about to crash, Elaine says "I've always...", but the pilot steadies the airplane. Elaine later explains in court that she was going to say "I've always loved United Airlines."

During her interview on Inside the Actors Studio, Julia Louis-Dreyfus said she believed Jerry and Elaine were soulmates but would never end up together because they were both too "insane and messed up."

In the reunion episode featured in Season 7 of Curb Your Enthusiasm, it is revealed in the years since the finale Jerry has donated sperm to Elaine that results in her having a daughter, who has taken to calling Jerry "Uncle Jerry", but by the episode's end, it is said she now refers to him as "daddy" to Jerry and Elaine's clear discomfort.

=== David Puddy ===
Elaine's longest relationship, besides that with Jerry, is with David Puddy (Patrick Warburton), an auto mechanic turned car salesman. Elaine begins dating David in the latter half of Season 6, and later for the majority of Season 9. Puddy has a casual approach to their relationship as seen in "The Voice" when Puddy claims he just likes her for the sex. In the same episode, when Elaine tells him that they're back together, he answers "Oh, no". In "The Finale", when Elaine is about to be taken away to prison, she emotionally tells Puddy to "not wait for her". Puddy answers back with a simple, casual, "Alright."
