= The Revenge (Seinfeld) =

- Seinfeld episode
- Episode no.: Season 2 Episode 7
- Directed by: Tom Cherones
- Written by: Larry David
- Production code: 212
- Original air date: April 18, 1991

Guest appearances
- Fred Applegate as Rick Levitan; John Capodice as Vic; Deck McKenzie as Bill; Patrika Darbo as Glenda; Teri Austin as Ava; Larry David as Newman (voice only; uncredited); Wayne Knight as Newman (syndicated version)

Episode chronology
← Previous "The Statue"	Next → "The Heart Attack"
- Seinfeld season 2

"The Revenge" is the seventh episode of the second season of the American sitcom Seinfeld, and the show's 12th episode overall. In this episode, George (Jason Alexander) quits his job without a plan and his boss snubs his attempt to take it back, so he drags Elaine (Julia Louis-Dreyfus) into a revenge plot on his boss. Jerry (Jerry Seinfeld) suspects his laundromat stole $1,500 he left in his laundry bag, so Kramer (Michael Richards) drags Jerry into a revenge plot on the laundromat.

Written by series co-creator Larry David and directed by Tom Cherones, the episode premiered in the United States on NBC on April 18, 1991. Largely based on David's own experiences, "The Revenge" was the first episode he wrote without Seinfeld's collaboration. The episode also contains the first mention of Newman, a suicidal man who lives in Jerry and Kramer's apartment building, who would later become a popular recurring character. As the episode is the first in which Kramer does physical comedy which the character would become well-known for, some cast and crew members consider it a turning point for the show. When first broadcast in the United States, the episode gained a Nielsen rating of 14.4/24 and was met with positive response from critics.

== Plot ==
At Rick Barr Properties, George barges into his boss Rick Levitan's office, quitting his job while burning his bridges in a tirade.

Kramer complains to Jerry about their long-suicidal neighbor Newman, who repeatedly calls in the wee hours threatening to jump, causing Kramer to start calling his bluff. Jerry is going to the laundromat, so Kramer piggybacks his own laundry into Jerry's load. Jerry is so wary of contact with Kramer's privates that he pays for two washing machines.

George tracks down Jerry to boast about quitting, because getting singled out for using Levitan's private bathroom was his last straw. However, despite knowing the real estate sector is not hiring, he has no job lined up. With the wind taken out of his sails, George has Jerry play job counselor as he lists off his other interests. Jerry points out that watching sports or movies falls short of a job qualification, then suggests that he return to work as if nothing had happened.

George tries to blend into the office meeting on Monday morning, but Levitan does not let him off the hook for the tirade, declaring that George cannot win against him. With an office anniversary party coming up, George plots to take revenge by spiking Levitan's drink with a Mickey, because it's "what they would do in the movies". He convinces Elaine to help distract Levitan, informing her that he is not only a sexist adulterer, but also does not recycle. Meanwhile, Newman tries to guilt Kramer by faking a fatal jump from the safety of the second floor. Jerry gets his laundry back, but cannot find $1,500 he hid in the laundry bag; the laundromat owner unsympathetically points to his liability disclaimer as Jerry and Kramer accuse him of theft.

At the party, Levitan is indifferent to Elaine's distractions until she pretends to be a nudist. He is enthralled as she blithely claims to spend every opportunity naked and let men have their way with her. George evicts an unfriendly coworker sitting next to Levitan by threatening to reveal her beehive hairdo as a wig. George spikes the drink undetected, but Levitan is so charmed by Elaine that he immediately gives a toast welcoming George back to the company, with the added privilege of using the bathroom. George tries to stop Levitan from drinking, but changes his mind when Levitan patronizingly roasts him.

Kramer insists on taking revenge on the laundromat by pouring cement into a washer, where it will solidify after a wash cycle. Jerry tries to distract the owner, but Kramer blatantly stumbles and falls carrying a heavy laundry bag of cement, then struggles to open a washer and gets cement in his eyes. He turns on the washer and returns to the storefront, half-covered in cement.

George returns to dejectedly racking his brains for tenuous job qualifications. Kramer finds Jerry's money in his own laundry all along; it happens to cover the damage they are liable for. Newman gets Kramer's attention, shouting from the roof offscreen, but forgets all about jumping as they discuss their plans for later.

== Production ==
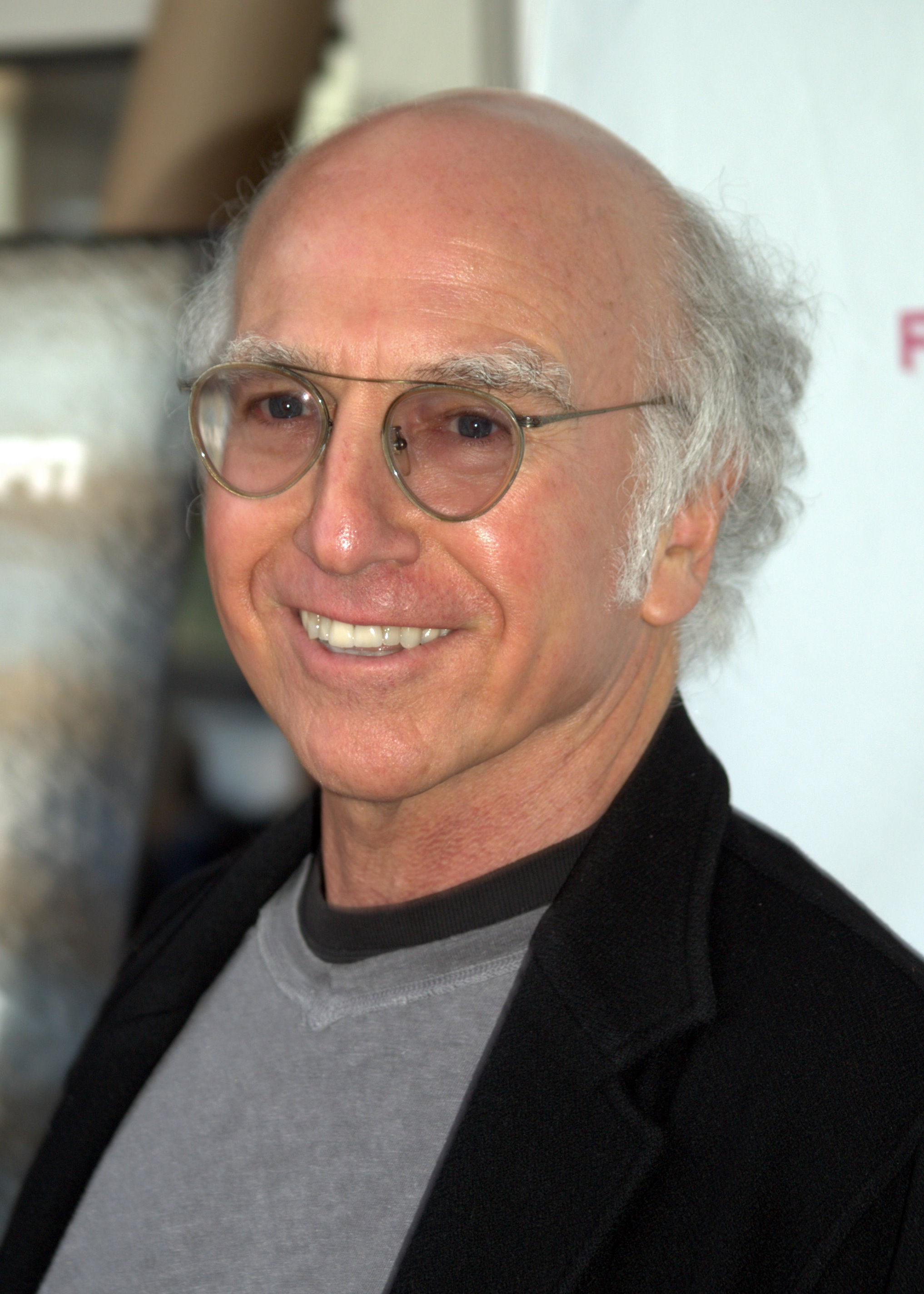
"The Revenge" was the first episode series co-creator Larry David wrote by himself.

"The Revenge" was written by series co-creator Larry David and directed by Tom Cherones. All prior Seinfeld episodes were co-written by Seinfeld and David. The Revenge is the first episode written by David alone, though Seinfeld did proofread the script and would continue to do so for all scripts up to the eighth season. George's storyline in the episode is based on David's own experiences while a writer at Saturday Night Live. David had quit SNL halfway through the 1984–1985 television season, but felt he had made a mistake once he reached his home. His neighbor Kenny Kramer, who later served as the main inspiration for Kramer, suggested David return to work the following Monday and act as if nothing had happened. Unlike George, the ploy succeeded for David, who remained with SNL's writing staff until the end of that season. George's reason for quitting was inspired by Seinfeld writer Larry Charles' use of the private restroom in Seinfeld and David's office instead of the public one. The Newman subplot was inspired by one of David's neighbors, who once jumped from the second floor of the apartment building in which they both lived. The unseen character Mr. Papanickolas, who is mentioned by Kramer, was named after production crew member Pete Papanickolas.

"The Revenge" was first read by the cast of the show on February 13, 1991 and was filmed in front of a live audience on February 20, 1991. Filming of the episode had been delayed two days due to President's Day. Both Alexander and Louis-Dreyfus praised the scene in which Jerry and George discuss the types of employment George could apply for after he quit his job. Louis-Dreyfus stated she was jealous that she was not in the scene. A number of scenes in the episode were removed prior to broadcast, such as one in which George and Kramer meet in the hallway and Kramer informs George that Jerry has gone to the laundromat. The writers decided that George could just say Kramer told him Jerry was at the laundromat and, upon that addition, the scene was cut. Initially, during Jerry and George's conversation about jobs, George mentions Regis Philbin, when they discuss George being a talk show host. Additional dialogue between George and Jerry at the laundromat was also removed. Because the episode "The Stranded" did not air until mid season three, the few references "The Revenge" contained to the episode were cut. The Newman subplot was significantly reduced; the character initially appeared in one scene, but it was never filmed. In that scene, he would have explained to Jerry and Kramer that he jumped from the roof, but an awning broke his fall, though Jerry and Kramer would remain skeptical. The episode also involved the second appearance of Harold the building superintendent, who had previously appeared in "The Apartment." Harold would inform the main characters that Newman made up the story about the awning breaking his fall, though, with the reduction of the Newman subplot, the scene was removed.

"It wasn't the show's best episode, but I liked "The Revenge" when I put dry cement into the washing machine. It was a 4½ minute routine. I was getting the stuff in my eyes, spilling it on the top of the machine. That kind of comedy is very special to my heart. It's hard comedy to do on TV."

— Michael Richards.

The cast considered the episode a turning point for the show. As a method actor, Richards insisted on dumping a real bag of cement into the washing machine used on set, so that the proper physical reactions to such a heavy object would be present. Richards stated that at that point, "rather than talking funny, I wanted to do funny." During the first take of the scene, Richards fell through a door and it had to be filmed again. "The Revenge" is also the first episode in which the George and Elaine characters collaborate. Louis-Dreyfus later stated that she and Alexander immediately had "some sort of shorthand with one another comedically, and [she] really relished that."

Although Newman's appearance was ultimately cut from the episode, auditions were held for the role; Tim Russ, who would go on to star in Star Trek: Voyager, auditioned, as did William Thomas, Jr., known for his appearance on The Cosby Show, who was cast in the part. Newman does share a brief dialogue with Kramer at the end of the episode, David recorded the lines, though he was not credited; this would be the first of David's 38 uncredited appearances on the show. The show's writing staff did not intend to have the character return in any later seasons, but because the idea of having actor Wayne Knight as a neighbor appealed to them, they re-cast Knight in the role of Newman in the character's first on-camera appearance in the season 3 episode "The Suicide." Afterwards, Knight re-recorded Newman's lines for the syndicated version of this episode to establish better continuity. Both Knight's and David's dialogue were included on the Seinfeld: Volume 1 DVD boxset. Additionally, Fred Applegate guest-starred as George's boss and John Capodice portrayed Vic, the laundromat owner. Deck McKenzie, who worked as Seinfeld's stand-in, portrayed George's colleague Bill. Teri Austin portrayed Ava, a co-worker of George's; she would appear again later in "The Stranded," which was filmed as part of season two, but aired as part of season three. Patrika Darbo, who played George's co-worker Glenda, would reappear later in the season five episode "The Sniffing Accountant" as a woman Newman flirts with.

== Reception ==
First broadcast in the United States on NBC on April 18, 1991, Nielsen Media Research estimated that the episode gained a Nielsen rating of 14.4 and an audience share of 24. This means that 14.4% of American households watched the episode, and that 24% of all televisions in use at the time were tuned into it. Seinfeld was the 15th most-watched program of the week it was broadcast in, and the sixth most-watched program broadcast on NBC. Entertainment Weekly reviewers Mike Flaherty and Mary Kaye Schilling gave the episode a mixed review and graded it with a C, stating "Although neat for its parallel plotting and George's hilariously clueless career chats with Jerry, 'The Revenge' is not so sweet." IGN critic Andy Patrizio considered "The Revenge" one of his personal favorites of season two. The scene in which Kramer struggles to put cement in one of the washing machines has gained positive responses from critics. Margery Eagan of The Boston Globe cited the scene as a perfect example of Kramer's personality. Neal Justin of the Minneapolis Star-Tribune also considers the scene to be one of the show's "classic moments." Daily News of Los Angeles critic Jody Leader also praised Seinfeld for how he distracted Vic in the scene.
