= The Apartment (Seinfeld) =

- Seinfeld episode
- Episode no.: Season 2 Episode 5
- Directed by: Tom Cherones
- Written by: Peter Mehlman
- Production code: 208
- Original air date: April 4, 1991

Guest appearances
- Glenn Shadix as Harold; Tony Plana as Manny; Jeanine Jackson as Roxanne; Leslie Neale as Rita; Theresa Randle as Janice; Patricia Ayame Thomson as Susie; David Blackwood as Stan; Mel Ryane as Joanne

Episode chronology
← Previous "The Phone Message"	Next → "The Statue"
- Seinfeld season 2

"The Apartment" is the fifth episode of the second season of the American television sitcom Seinfeld (and the tenth episode overall). It first aired on NBC in the United States on April 4, 1991, following a two-month hiatus after the underwhelming reception of the previous episode "The Phone Message". In this episode, Jerry (Jerry Seinfeld) invites Elaine (Julia Louis-Dreyfus) to move in upstairs, but realizes too late that this would impinge on his personal space. George (Jason Alexander), hearing that a wedding band can attract women, tries it for himself.

The episode was written by Peter Mehlman and directed by Tom Cherones. Series co-creators Seinfeld and Larry David asked Mehlman to write an episode for the show after they read a few articles he wrote for newspapers and magazines. Mehlman originally had the idea of Elaine moving away from Jerry, but David and Seinfeld felt it would be funnier if Elaine moved closer to Jerry instead. In its original broadcast, "The Apartment" was watched in 15.7 million homes, making it the ninth most-watched program of the week it was broadcast, and gained mostly positive responses from critics.

== Plot ==
Kramer declares that hair mousse has changed his life, and wears his hair styled for the entire episode. Elaine invites everyone to brunch and to watch the New York City Marathon at her friend's apartment.

Building managers Harold and Manny inform Jerry that Mrs. Hudwalker, upstairs from him, has died. Since Elaine is looking for an apartment, they invite her to move in for just $400 per month. Jerry melodramatically keeps Elaine in suspense before breaking the news, stunning her. Elaine is elated that she will be able to visit any time, and Jerry realizes too late that he does not want this, and that all his comings and goings—including bringing dates home—will be in earshot of Elaine.

Jerry catches George at Monk's to kick himself over his mistake, and they contest which of them is the bigger idiot. George, having heard that his newlywed friend became more alluring with a wedding band, goes to Kramer to borrow his father's wedding band. Kramer suggests George cover his baldness instead.

Jerry gets a lifeline when someone else offers $5,000 for the upstairs apartment. Knowing that Elaine can't match the bid, Jerry gives thanks to divine intervention while pretending to be sorry for bursting her bubble. Unfortunately, Kramer nonchalantly volunteers Jerry to lend her the $5,000, insisting that it is no trouble to him. Kramer cannot understand why Elaine living upstairs would impinge on Jerry, and Jerry explains that only a Pod Person could live so freely as Kramer.

At the marathon brunch, Jerry turns off the host, Roxanne, with his disinterest in all the runners bringing up the rear. Many women are indeed attracted to George as he pretends to be married, and he misses out on pursuing a woman who gets free Madison Square Garden tickets; another woman who likes bald, spectacled men; and another woman who offers long-term, non-exclusive sex. Jerry puts on a strained smile as everyone congratulates him on having Elaine upstairs. Elaine finally questions whether this arrangement will be intrusive, but Jerry hesitates and misses his chance to back out. Jerry and George again compare their idiocy.

As George struggles to get the wedding band off, Jerry is finally resigned to confront Elaine, but he is bailed out when Kramer finds a musician who pays $10,000 to move in upstairs. Unfortunately, this results in a rock band practicing loudly upstairs at all hours of the day.

== Production ==
"[...] Seinfeld was the only show in which you came up with your own storylines or you were gone. There was no 'writers' room'. You wrote and rewrote your own scripts before kissing them off to Larry David and Jerry so they could dose it with magic."

— Mehlman about the Seinfeld writing process.

"The Apartment" was written by Peter Mehlman and directed by Tom Cherones. Seinfeld and co-creator Larry David contacted Mehlman and asked him to write an episode for the show after reading a few articles Mehlman had written for The New York Times and Esquire. Mehlman noted that prior to Seinfeld he had "barely written any dialogue in [his] life". He first conceived the idea of an episode in which Elaine would move away from Manhattan and Jerry had to confront his feelings about her. He discussed the idea with Seinfeld, David and staff writer Larry Charles, who felt that it would be funnier if Elaine moved closer to Jerry instead. After their meeting, Mehlman was told to write the episode, which surprised him, describing it as "unlike any other show, where they would have given beat for beat for beat". As Mehlman was writing the script, he came up with the idea of George wearing a wedding ring to a party to see how women would react. Though the wedding ring idea was not included in the approved script, Seinfeld and David decided to keep it as it suited George well.

The first table read of the episode was held on January 9, 1991. The episode was filmed in front of a live audience on January 15, 1991. Filming of the episode took place at the CBS Studio Center in Studio City, Los Angeles, California, where, starting with the season two premiere "The Ex-Girlfriend," filming of all the show's episodes took place. A few scenes were changed prior to the filming of the episode. The scene in which Jerry informs George he told Elaine about the apartment initially showed them standing in line for the movies, talking about sitting in the front of the theatre. George would tell Jerry that he once pretended to have a grotesque physical impairment while he was standing in line to get a ticket for The Exorcist, and people would let him go in front of them without saying anything. The location of this scene, however, was changed to Monk's Cafe, a regular hangout for the show's main characters, and George and Jerry's dialogue was shortened. In the original script, Jerry, instead of George, proclaimed himself "lord of the idiots," but this was changed during rehearsals.

"The Apartment" featured the only appearance of Harold and Manny, the two building superintendents. Veteran actors Glenn Shadix and Tony Plana portrayed Harold and Manny, respectively. Their part in the episode was originally smaller, but they were written into the final scene. Harold was set to return in the season two episode "The Revenge," in which he would tell the show's central characters that Jerry's suicidal neighbor Newman jumped from the building, but an awning broke his fall. However, the Newman subplot in the episode was significantly reduced during production and Harold's part was cut. Theresa Randle, Patricia Ayame Thomson and Leslie Neale guest starred as women George unsuccessfully flirts with while wearing a wedding ring. Louis-Dreyfus' half-sister Lauren Bowles appeared as an extra at the party attended by George, Jerry and Elaine. Bowles would continue to appear regularly throughout the series' run, frequently as a waitress at Monk's Cafe. Additionally, David Blackwood, who appeared as a party guest, also continued to make small appearances on the show. Assistant director Joan Van Horn appeared as a woman feeding her baby at Monk's Cafe.

The episode marks the first time Elaine does her trademark "Get Out!" shove; the catchphrase was not in the original script, but was added at Louis-Dreyfus' suggestion. It became one of the show's popular catchphrases. "The Apartment" is the first episode in which Jerry's apartment number is 5A; it had been changed a few times prior to the broadcast of this episode, but remained 5A until the end of the show. It is also contains one of the few references to Kramer's father, who remained unseen throughout the show's run.

== Reception ==
The episode was first aired in the United States on NBC on April 4, 1991 as part of a Thursday night line-up that also included Cheers and L.A. Law. "The Apartment" gained a Nielsen rating of 16.9 and an audience share of 28, meaning that 16.9% of American households watched the episode, and that 28% of all televisions in use at the time were tuned into it. Nielsen also estimated that 15.7 million homes were tuned into the episode, making Seinfeld the ninth most-watched show in the week the episode was broadcast, while 20.5 million homes tuned into Cheers. Seinfeld's ability to keep a large number of Cheers' audience eventually helped the show get a third season order.

Ocala Star-Banner critic Jon Burlingame praised the episode for its "smart humor" and stated the show could be a perfect fit between Cheers and L.A. Law. Mike Flaherty and Mary Kaye Schilling of Entertainment Weekly reacted very positively to the episode and praised Alexander's performance in particular, stating "George's profound self-hatred is now in full bloom ('Please, a little respect, for I am Costanza, Lord of the Idiots!'). Kramer's input, meanwhile, remains limited to off-the-wall, often annoying cameos. Which reminds us: Why in the world has Alexander been denied an Emmy, while Richards has scored two?" Schilling and Flaherty graded the episode with a B+. However, The Kitchener-Waterloo Record critic Bonnie Malleck gave the episode a particularly negative review; comparing Seinfeld to It's Garry Shandling's Show, she stated "Seinfeld isn't neurotic enough to be as funny as [Garry Shandling]. So, instead of being nervously funny, he's just nervously dull."
