= The Jacket (Seinfeld) =

- Seinfeld episode
- Episode no.: Season 2 Episode 3
- Directed by: Tom Cherones
- Written by: Larry David; Jerry Seinfeld
- Production code: 205
- Original air date: February 6, 1991

Guest appearances
- Lawrence Tierney as Alton Benes; Frantz Turner as Salesman; Suanne Spoke as Customer; Harry Hart-Browne as Manager

Episode chronology
← Previous "The Pony Remark"	Next → "The Phone Message"
- Seinfeld season 2

"The Jacket" is the third episode of the second season of the American television sitcom Seinfeld (and the eighth episode overall). It first aired on NBC in the United States on February 6, 1991. In the episode, Jerry is pleased with his new suede jacket despite its eye-watering price. Jerry and George must keep Elaine's father Alton company as they wait for Elaine to arrive for dinner, but they are no match against the misanthropic Alton.

The episode was written by Larry David and Jerry Seinfeld, and was directed by Tom Cherones. Most of the episode's storyline was based on one of David's personal experiences. Elaine's father, a published author, was inspired by Richard Yates, author of Revolutionary Road, whom Larry David had met while dating his daughter. Lawrence Tierney's performance as Alton Benes was praised by the cast and crew; however, they were taken aback by his disturbing behavior. The majority of the episode was filmed on December 4, 1990. "The Jacket" gained a Nielsen rating of 10.4/16 and was praised by critics.

== Plot ==
Elaine's father, Alton, a noted author, is visiting, and she drags Jerry and George along as social buffers. Jerry goes shopping for clothes and serendipitously finds a perfectly-fitting suede jacket. Despite an eye-watering price tag and loud, pink striped lining, Jerry is sold. He proudly wears the jacket even over pajamas, but fails to hide the price tag from Kramer. Kramer eyes Jerry's old leather jacket and wheedles it out of Jerry as a hand-me-down.

George is enjoying singing along with "Master of the House" from Les Misérables stuck in his head, until Jerry tells him how Robert Schumann was institutionalized after hearing a musical note repeatedly. They both expect that Alton will read them like a book, but his jacket bolsters Jerry's confidence. Impressed, George incessantly guesses at the price tag, but Jerry is poker-faced even as the figures cross four digits. Kramer, going to pick up his magician friend's doves, needs a passenger for "two minutes" while he is double parked; Jerry and George both beg off as they head out. Jerry knows firsthand that favors for Kramer take much longer than promised.

At the luxurious Hotel Westbury, Jerry and George find Alton, a gravel-voiced, imposing man. Alton is blunt, humorless, and curt in response to their small talk, and Jerry reminds him of serving in Korea with a "funny guy" who was brutally KIA. With Elaine nowhere to be found, Jerry and George take temporary refuge in the men's room, but find no escape from Alton for another half hour. Elaine, having unsuspectingly agreed to help Kramer, finally arrives after failing to prevent Kramer's car from getting towed, and then chasing down escaped doves. Jerry and George pretend that keeping Alton company was no trouble at all.

Alton leads them all to a restaurant five blocks away and puts a stop to George's singing. With snow falling, Jerry realizes his jacket will not survive the walk. He flips it to the striped side, but Alton forbids him from such garish attire.

The next day, Elaine and Kramer chide Jerry for ruining his jacket. Kramer, willing to wear it regardless, gets it as another hand-me-down and keeps both jackets. Elaine confides that Alton, in secret, liked Jerry. Alton drives home, singing "Master of the House" to himself.

== Cultural references ==
- Throughout the episode, George sings the song "Master of the House" from the musical Les Misérables. Les Misérables ran on Broadway for sixteen years, making it one of the longest-running musicals in Broadway's history. In response to George constantly singing "Master of the House", Jerry tells him about German composer Robert Schumann, who went insane from hearing the same note over and over in his head.
- George mentions Bud Abbott, an actor and comedian during the 1940s and 1950s, who was part of the Abbott and Costello duo.
- When Jerry and George discuss their options in the hotel bathroom, George suggests that they leave, to which Jerry replies "He'll clunk our heads together like Moe." This a reference to Moe Howard, one of The Three Stooges, who frequently clunked the heads of the other Stooges together.

== Production ==
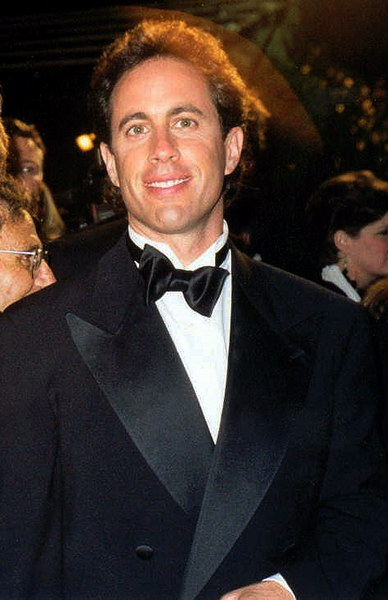
Jerry Seinfeld co-wrote the episode

"The Jacket" was written by Seinfeld co-creators Larry David and Jerry Seinfeld and directed by Tom Cherones. The episode's storyline was based on one of David's personal experiences; when he was dating Monica Yates, she wanted him to meet her father, Richard Yates, a respected novelist. David had just bought a suede jacket, and met Richard Yates at the Algonquin Hotel. David stated in an interview that Richard Yates was "... every bit as intimidating as Alton Benes". His story is similar to what happened in the episode, as, when they headed out to the restaurant, his jacket was ruined by the snow. Additional dialogue at the store where Jerry buys his jacket was cut before broadcast; it featured a reference to Gary Gilmore. The material was later included on the Seinfeld Volume 1 DVD set. "The Jacket" is the only episode in which one of Elaine's parents appears; Louis-Dreyfus once suggested Mary Tyler Moore to portray Elaine's mother, but the character never appeared on the show. The episode also contains the first mention of Elaine's job as a manuscript reader for Pendant Publishing; in early drafts of the script, her job was an optician. Also in early drafts, in the final scene Kramer entered Jerry's house with a dove on his shoulder.

The episode was first read by the cast on November 28, 1990 at 10:30 AM. It was filmed in front of a live audience on December 4, 1990. The episode was filmed at CBS Studio Center in Studio City, Los Angeles, California, where, starting with the season two premiere "The Ex-Girlfriend", all filming for the second season took place. The final scene in the episode, which showed Alton Benes singing "Master of the House" in his car, was pre-recorded on December 3, 1990, as it could not be filmed in front of an audience because it took place in a car.

Lawrence Tierney was cast as Alton Benes. He was known for his bad-guy roles in films during the 1940s and 1950s, such as Dillinger, The Hoodlum and Born to Kill. Tierney's appearance in the episode is one of his few comedic roles. Cast and crew members were very impressed with his performance. However, they were frightened of him; during filming it was discovered that Tierney had stolen a butcher knife from the knife block in Jerry's apartment set. Various cast members remember Seinfeld encountering Tierney and stating "Hey Lawrence, what do you got there in your jacket?" Tierney then jokingly reenacted the shower scene from Alfred Hitchcock's Psycho (1960), holding the knife above his head and making stabbing motions towards Seinfeld while vocalizing the scene's musical cue, "The Murder". Cherones stated that, afterwards, Larry David would jokingly threaten to have Tierney back on the show if Cherones did his work badly.

== Reception ==
On February 6, 1991, "The Jacket" was first broadcast in the United States on NBC. It gained a Nielsen rating of 10.4 and an audience share of 16, this means that 10.4% of American households watched the episode, and that 16% of all televisions in use at the time were tuned into it. It faced strong competition from the CBS crime drama Jake and the Fatman; viewers would frequently tune out of Seinfeld to watch the second half of Jake and the Fatman's episode. Seinfeld once jokingly stated that this was because the "Fatman" would run in the second half of the show.

The episode gained positive responses from critics. Colin Jacobson of DVD Movie Guide stated, "An otherwise mediocre episode, Lawrence Tierney's gruff turn as Elaine's father helps redeem 'The Jacket.'" DVD reviewer Jonathan Boudreaux considered "The Jacket" one of season two's best episodes, along with "The Chinese Restaurant". Critics Mary Kaye Schilling and Mike Flaherty of Entertainment Weekly graded the episode with a B−, stating, "Jerry and George's torturous hotel-lobby meeting with Mr. Benes is a squirm-inducing joy."
