= The Phone Message =

- Seinfeld episode
- Episode no.: Season 2 Episode 4
- Directed by: Tom Cherones
- Written by: Larry David; Jerry Seinfeld
- Production code: 207
- Original air date: February 13, 1991

Guest appearances
- Tory Polone as Carol; Gretchen German as Donna

Episode chronology
← Previous "The Jacket"	Next → "The Apartment"
- Seinfeld season 2

"The Phone Message" is the fourth episode of the second season of the American television sitcom Seinfeld (and the ninth episode overall). It first aired on NBC in the United States on February 13, 1991. In the episode, George's pessimism over his date makes him leave disastrous answering machine messages for her, while Jerry turns against his own date because she likes a Dockers TV commercial.

Written by series creators Jerry Seinfeld and Larry David and directed by Tom Cherones, the episode was produced to replace a script by staff writer Larry Charles. Charles had written an episode called "The Bet", revolving around Elaine Benes buying a handgun. The script's gun content was deemed too provocative and, in little time, Seinfeld and David wrote "The Phone Message" to fill the production void. The episode was met with positive critical responses, but its initial broadcast was watched by an underwhelming audience of 13 million viewers, causing NBC to put the show on a two-month hiatus.

== Plot ==
George is too nervous to ask a woman out, but he gets over it and calls her when his coworker calls him a "wuss". On Saturday night, George and Jerry both charm their respective dates, Carol and Donna. George turns down Carol's invitation to come up for coffee, as it is too late at night, and then immediately regrets taking the invitation literally. Jerry brings Donna back to his place, where they cuddle and agree to meet again. The mood is soured when Jerry nitpicks a TV commercial for Dockers cotton pants, and refuses to back down when Donna defends the commercial.

The next day, Jerry is still fixated on the commercial as a dealbreaker, while George is still kicking himself, to the point of taking antacids. Jerry and Elaine suggest he is overreacting, and encourage him to call back. Kramer offers a joke for Jerry's act about drivers who do not yield to ambulances, but Jerry turns him down.

George kicks everyone out of Jerry's apartment so he can call Carol undisturbed. He improvises a self-deprecating, noncommittal, and rambling message on her answering machine, and immediately predicts doom. Elaine is reminded that her brother-in-law once went so far as to hide a compromising message on the recipient's machine, to swap tapes.

Days later, Jerry and Donna are reconciling when George, then Kramer, arrives and identifies her as the defender in the Dockers commercial. Discomfited by being gossiped about, and still standing by the commercial, Donna leaves; Jerry considers this no significant loss. George confesses that he has been leaving daily messages for Carol, and finally flew off the handle on the last one—only for Carol to call back, eager to meet again, as she returns from a trip.

George needs to swap the tape on Carol's machine as soon as she gets home, but, lacking the nerve, goads Jerry into doing it by calling him a wuss. They prepare both a regular and microcassette, and plan signals to avoid being caught in the act, such as singing "Maria" or "Lemon Tree" aloud. When Carol arrives, they make up flimsy excuses for George waiting for her with Jerry; for Jerry to use her bathroom; and for George to whisk Carol aside privately. They get away with the swap, but their efforts are wasted, as Carol had already heard George's messages and assumed they were jokes.

== Production ==
=== "The Bet" ===
Staff writer Larry Charles had written a script for an episode titled "The Bet". In the episode, which was also known as "The Gun", Elaine would bet against Jerry on the ease of buying a handgun to protect herself. The episode's subplot revolved around Jerry's neighbor Kramer returning from a vacation in Puerto Rico, claiming he had sex with a stewardess on his flight home. George and Jerry would remain skeptical and make a bet with him; eventually, George, Jerry and Elaine would go to the airport to check if Kramer was telling the truth. In writing "The Bet", Charles had attempted to make a "funny, dark-themed" episode. Sets for the episode were built. Bobbi Jo Lathan was cast as flight attendant Lucy Merrit and Ernie Sabella was cast as gun salesman Mo Korn, who was described in the script as "overweight, greasy, slow and low-key".

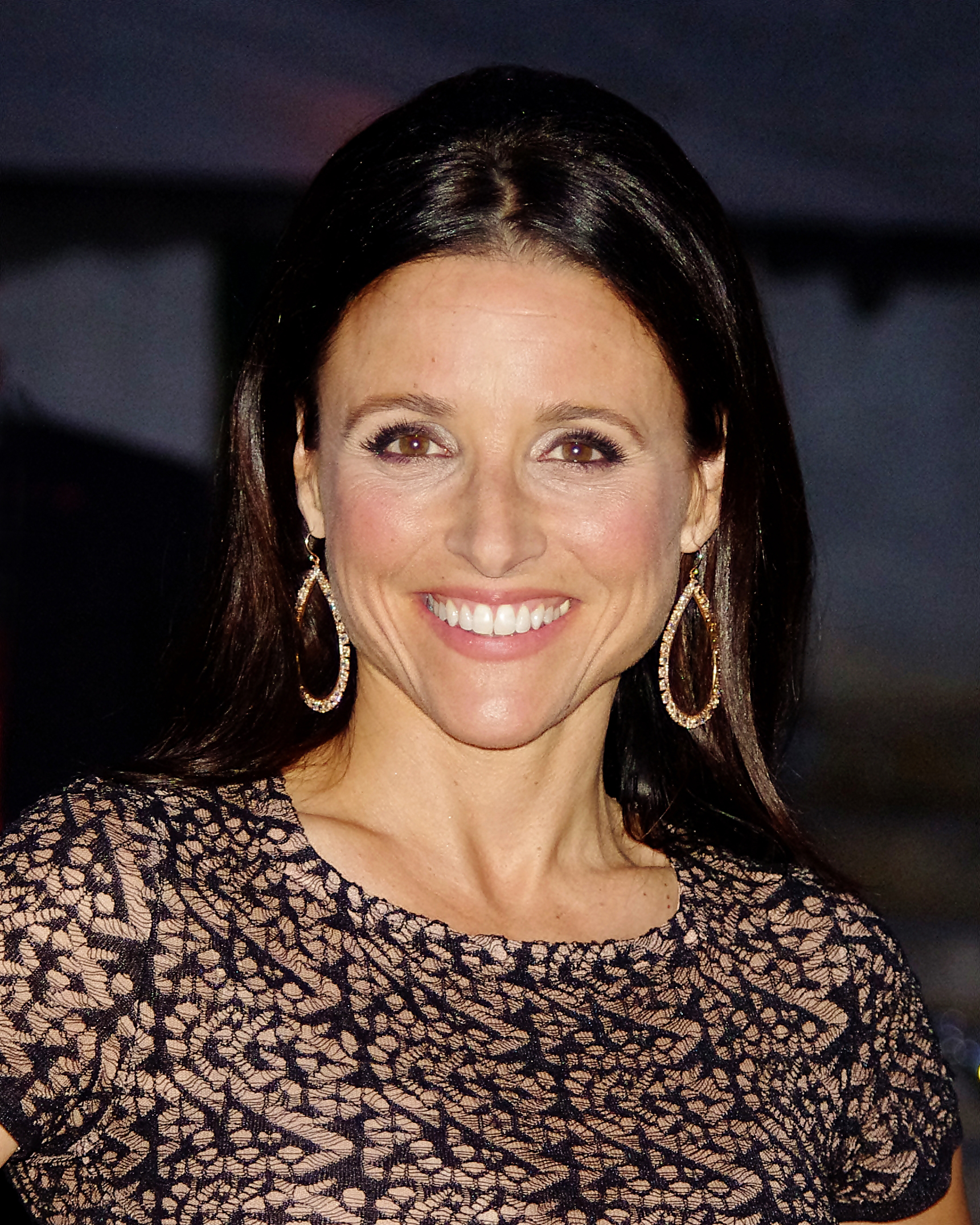
In the cancelled episode "The Bet", Julia Louis-Dreyfus' character, Elaine Benes, makes a bet with Jerry about being able to buy a gun.

However, during the read-through of the episode, it was negatively received by cast and crew members; both Alexander and director Tom Cherones felt the episode's gun content was too provocative. When she read a scene that referenced the assassinations of John F. Kennedy and William McKinley, Louis-Dreyfus turned to Alexander and stated, "I'm not gonna do this." Though they did not want to, the cast started rehearsing. After 20 minutes they convinced Cherones to talk to Charles. On his way to Charles' office, Cherones bumped into NBC executive Glenn Padnick, with whom he talked to Charles, eventually agreeing not to film the episode. Commenting on the episode, Charles stated "You know, it would have been an interesting show, but [...] we couldn't solve the funny problem of it. It never seemed to quite be as funny as it should be and, because of that, the balance was off and the darkness kind of enveloped it, and it could never really emerge from that darkness and become what it should have been. So, it was disappointing but also understandable."

Both Lathan and Sabella were given roles in later episodes; Lathan appeared as Patti in "The Stranded", produced for the same season but airing in season three, while Sabella was cast as the "greasy naked guy" in "The Subway" in the third season.

=== "The Phone Message" ===
Series co-creator Larry David co-wrote the episode with Seinfeld in two days, as they had little time to write the script due to the cancellation of "The Bet". George's storyline was largely based on David's personal experiences of leaving phone messages to women that would cause the end of a relationship. David had previously written a sketch for Saturday Night Live regarding a man who went into his girlfriend's house to erase her answering machine. The sketch was never produced, allowing David to use its storyline for the Seinfeld episode. Jerry's storyline was based on Seinfeld's own predicaments, as he disliked the cotton Dockers commercial discussed in the episode.

A few changes were made to the first few drafts of the script. Additional dialogue between George and Jerry regarding dates during the 1850s was removed for timing purposes. During his date with Donna, Jerry would mention his remark about ponies in the earlier episode "The Pony Remark", but this was later changed to a remark about leaving a note when committing suicide. Initially, Kramer's first name was revealed in the episode; though the information was removed from the eventual script, the idea of revealing Kramer's first name would be further exploited in the season six episode "The Switch".

Gretchen German was cast as Jerry's date Donna. Gina Hecht, who would go on to portray George's psychiatrist Dana Foley during the show's fourth season, also auditioned for the part. Tory Polone, who portrayed George's date Carol, had previously appeared in the 1989 television films When We Were Young and Sparks. The episode was first read by the cast on Friday, December 14, 1990. Table reads usually took place on Wednesdays, but the read-through of "The Bet" had been held on December 12. Directed by Cherones, as were all other episodes of the second season, "The Phone Message" was filmed in front of a live audience on December 19, 1990. Jerry's stand-up routine had been filmed one day earlier.

== Reception ==
The episode was first broadcast in the United States on February 13, 1991, on NBC. "The Phone Message" received a Nielsen rating of 9.7 and an audience share of 15, indicating that 9.7% of American households watched the episode, and that 15% of all televisions in use at the time were tuned into it. Nielsen Media Research also estimated that approximately 13 million American viewers watched the episode, making it the 59th most-watched show of the week it was broadcast in. Disappointed with the ratings, as earlier episodes had averaged between 19 and 22 million viewers each, the network put the show on a two-month hiatus. When the series returned in its original timeslot behind Cheers, its high ratings and increasing popularity led NBC to order the full season.

"The Phone Message" gained positive responses from critics. Jerry's dumping Donna because she likes the commercial has been frequently cited as an example of how the show's central characters would often break up with people for "fantastically insignificant reasons." In a 1998 article, the staff of South Carolina newspaper The State cited "The Phone Message" as "the first episode that made an impression on [them]," referring to Seinfeld as "the comedic version of Hill Street Blues." Entertainment Weekly critics Mike Flaherty and Mary Kaye Schilling graded the episode with a B+, calling it "the first of two consecutive and classic George angst-fests, as Jason Alexander—master of frantic venom—begins to make the character his own."
