= The Statue (Seinfeld) =

- Seinfeld episode
- Episode no.: Season 2 Episode 6
- Directed by: Tom Cherones
- Written by: Larry Charles
- Production code: 210
- Original air date: April 11, 1991

Guest appearances
- Nurit Koppel as Rava; Michael D. Conway as Ray

Episode chronology
← Previous "The Apartment"	Next → "The Revenge"
- Seinfeld season 2

"The Statue" is the sixth episode of the second season of the American sitcom Seinfeld, and the show's 11th episode overall. In the episode, George (Jason Alexander) plans to use Jerry's (Jerry Seinfeld) grandfather's old statue to redeem himself for a childhood disgrace, but, after Ray (Michael D. Conway) cleans Jerry's apartment, the statue turns up at Ray's home. Meanwhile, Elaine's (Julia Louis-Dreyfus) promotion at work depends on staying in the good graces of Ray's girlfriend Rava.

The episode was written by Larry Charles and directed by Tom Cherones. The character of Jerry's neighbor Kramer (Michael Richards) is developed in this episode, as he goes undercover as a cop to retrieve the statue. Charles was interested in the development of Kramer, as he felt George and Jerry had their counterparts in co-creators Larry David and Seinfeld. Richards enjoyed how Kramer acted in the episode and encouraged Charles to continue exploiting the character. "The Statue" first aired on NBC on April 11, 1991 in the United States and was watched by over 23 million American homes.

== Plot ==
Kramer calls dibs on Jerry's late grandfather's effects, which went unclaimed by any relatives for years in storage. Kramer takes an outfit which makes him "look like Joe Friday in Dragnet", and a statue of a woman in a dress. George recognizes the statue as the same one he dropped and broke at home as a child, a disgrace that scarred him for life. George wrestles Kramer for the statue, and Jerry settles ownership by "ink-a-dink", secretly rigging it for George. George leaves the statue with Jerry to pick up later.

Jerry goes on a trip, leaving his apartment to be cleaned by Ray, the boyfriend of Elaine's friend Rava, a morbidly-disposed writer from Finland. Thanks to Rava, who will only let Elaine's company publish her manuscript if Elaine is editing, Elaine is due to be promoted to editor. While Ray is pompously grandiloquent, he impeccably scours every nook and cranny at Jerry's, even astonishingly removing the dish soap nozzle buildup. Jerry is so impressed that he visits Rava and Ray with Elaine.

During the visit, Jerry recognizes the statue on Ray's mantle. At a loss, he frantically confers with Elaine, who is anxious to stay in Rava's good graces. Jerry misses his chance to call Kramer to check at home.

Jerry's statue is indeed gone, but the police have no evidence to act on. George needs the statue back since he has already promised a surprise to his parents, while Kramer wants to retaliate. Jerry calls Ray, who asks to meet at Monk's discreetly. Ray acts clueless, unconvincingly claiming the statue came from a pawnshop whose owner left the country, while accusing Jerry of jealousy. George, increasingly infuriated as he eavesdrops, blows up and declares Ray guilty, but gets intimidated when Ray towers over him.

The next day, Rava and Elaine have a long elevator ride. Elaine, despite planning to be neutral, cannot help but find the circumstantial evidence against Ray compelling, starting a fight. Accused by Rava of jealousy, Elaine tells off Rava and throws out her manuscript, and loses the promotion. Everyone bitterly reconvenes at Jerry's as George's mother shuns him for losing the statue. As Ray admires the statue in private, Kramer, impersonating a police officer in his Joe Friday getup, browbeats Ray into submission with heinous charges as he nabs the statue. George gratefully reclaims the statue, but a hearty slap on the back from Kramer makes him drop and break it.

== Cultural references ==
- George explains that he broke the original statue while using it as a microphone and singing the song "MacArthur Park" by Jimmy Webb; in early drafts of the script, George broke it while singing Eddie Cochran's "Summertime Blues."
- The episode contains numerous references to the television crime drama Dragnet. This was because writer Larry Charles watched a lot of reruns of the show while writing for Seinfeld. Kramer's manner when he retrieves the statue was inspired by Joe Friday, the central character of Dragnet.
- At the end of the episode Kramer states, "Well, let's put it this way: I didn't take him to People's Court", a reference to the judicial television show.

== Production ==
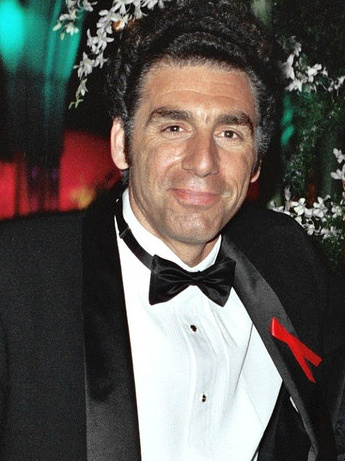
Michael Richards was pleased with the development of the Kramer character in the episode and encouraged Charles to continue exploiting the Kramer character after the episode was filmed.

The episode was written by Larry Charles and directed by Tom Cherones, who directed all of the episodes in Season 2. "The Statue" was the second episode Charles wrote for the show, though it was the first to be aired. Charles was mostly interested in the development of the Kramer character, as he felt "Jerry and George were so well-defined through Larry [David] and Jerry, that there was less room for me to, sort of, expand on those personas. But Kramer was very unformed at the beginning of the show and it gave me an area of creativity to, sort of, expand upon. So I spent a lot of time with Kramer because he was a character that I could have an impact on in the future of the show." Richards enjoyed how his character evolved and, after the filming of the episode, went to Seinfeld, Charles and David and said "we should keep going that way." He cites this episode, as well as "The Revenge" (in which Kramer puts concrete in a washing machine), as episodes that really defined the character.

The first read-through of the episode was held on January 23, 1991, the same night the second season premiered. "The Statue" was filmed in front of a live audience six days later. A few scenes were changed prior to filming; in an early draft of the script Elaine sat next to George eavesdropping on Jerry and Ray's conversation. She would wear a floppy hat to look inconspicuous and complain about it, stating that she looks like one of the Cowsills, a singing group that was active between the 1960s and 1970s. The same scene initially featured George admitting that he spied on Ray a day earlier, showing Ray pictures of him in a bar. Ray would reply that it was his day off and asks why George is not at work, to which George replies that he should be getting back and leaves. In the original script, Elaine and Rava would argue over who is a better person: Jerry or Ray.

Writer's assistant Karen Wilkie can be seen in the audience during Seinfeld's stand-up comedy act. Nurit Koppel, who portrayed Rava, was known for her appearance in the CBS television movie Sweet Bird of Youth (1989) as well as a guest appearance on the NBC crime drama Hunter. Jane Leeves, who later appeared as Marla the Virgin in season four and season nine, also auditioned for the part; she went on to star in the NBC sitcom Frasier (1993–2004). In the script, Ray Thomas' description was, "although he carries cleaning equipment, he also carries the air of a pretentious mannerly, affected actor." Various actors auditioned for the part, including Hank Azaria, Michael D. Conway and Tony Shalhoub, who had also auditioned for the part of Kramer. Conway was eventually cast for the part. Norman Brenner, who worked as Richards' stand-in on the show for all its nine seasons, appears as an extra; he appears in the background when Jerry and Ray talk at Monk's Cafe.

== Reception ==
First broadcast in the United States on NBC on April 11, 1991, "The Statue" gained a Nielsen rating of 16.1 and an audience share of 26. This means that 16.1% of American households watched the episode, and that 26% of all televisions in use at the time were tuned into it. Nielsen estimated that over 23 million people watched the episode's initial broadcast, making it the tenth most-watched program of the week in which it was broadcast.

The episode received mixed reactions from critics. Writing for Entertainment Weekly, critics Mary Kaye Schilling and Mike Flaherty stated "Even Seinfeld's bit players must have some grounding in reality — you need to love to hate them. Ultimately, there's no redeeming comic payoff to Rava's and Ray's weirdness." Flaherty and Schilling graded the episode with a C−. Colin Jacobson of the DVD Movie Guide called the episode's storyline "fairly pedestrian," but felt the performances of Conway and Koppel saved the episode.
