= The Deal (Seinfeld) =

- Seinfeld episode
- Episode no.: Season 2 Episode 9
- Directed by: Tom Cherones
- Written by: Larry David
- Production code: 213
- Original air date: May 2, 1991

Guest appearances
- Siobhan Fallon as Tina; Norman Brenner as Clerk

Episode chronology
← Previous "The Heart Attack"	Next → "The Baby Shower"
- Seinfeld season 2

"The Deal" is the ninth episode of the second season of NBC's Seinfeld, and the show's 14th episode overall. In this episode, Jerry (Jerry Seinfeld) and Elaine (Julia Louis-Dreyfus) become friends with benefits, but struggle to keep their friendship free of relationship drama.

Series co-creator Larry David wrote the episode in a response to NBC's continued efforts to get the two characters back together. The main inspiration behind the episode was a similar agreement David once made with a woman. The episode, which introduced the character of Tina, Elaine's roommate, first aired on May 2, 1991 and was watched by approximately 22.6 million viewers. Critics reacted positively to the episode, and David received a nomination for the Primetime Emmy Award for Outstanding Writing for a Comedy Series.

== Plot ==
Elaine and Jerry lounge in front of the TV, making note that Elaine's birthday and Jerry's root canal are both coming up. Flipping to a pornography channel reminds them that they are both sex-deprived. They think back to their sexual history together—pantomimed by gesticulating at the bedroom—and agree that they should indulge themselves again from time to time. Concerned that their friendship would be soured by relationship drama, they come up with rules to relieve themselves of obligations: they will not call each other the next day, they are not required to spend the night, and they will not kiss goodnight.

The next morning, Kramer (Michael Richards), seeing Elaine in Jerry's shirt, gets the hint and clears out. Jerry invites George (Jason Alexander) to Monk's just to gloat about sleeping with Elaine, but George, still jobless and having nothing better to do, demands details. Learning of their friends with benefits arrangement, George incredulously admonishes them for thinking they, of all people, can "have their cake and eat it too". George is impressed by the foresight of their first rule, but warns that the second rule is wishful thinking.

Just as George predicted, Jerry, planning an early morning for the root canal, provokes Elaine by heading out after sex at her place. Elaine insists that spending the night is the prerogative of whoever's home it is. After Elaine's roommate Tina returns and breaks the tension, Elaine calms down and lets Jerry go.

Jerry and George shop for birthday gifts for Elaine. Jerry, now on guard, caps George's spending at half his own, and vetoes every present that could be interpreted as courtship. He remembers Elaine needing a "bench", but second-guesses what she really meant. In the end, Elaine is disappointed by his faux pas of giving $182 in cash, and his wishy-washy birthday card addressed to "a great pal". Kramer upstages Jerry by indeed getting Elaine a literal bench, and a card with a touching verse by W. B. Yeats, to her heartfelt gratitude.

Elaine and Jerry realize that drama has indeed damaged their friendship, to the point that Elaine wants to either be a couple again or part ways. George, who came out no better from giving Elaine $91, realizes he would break up with her "by association" with Jerry. They imagine that if Jerry lets Elaine go, they will one day find her married and murder her husband in jealousy, resulting in execution for Jerry and jail for George. Jerry duly calls to get back together.

The next morning, Kramer is disgusted watching Elaine and Jerry being lovey-dovey.

== Production ==
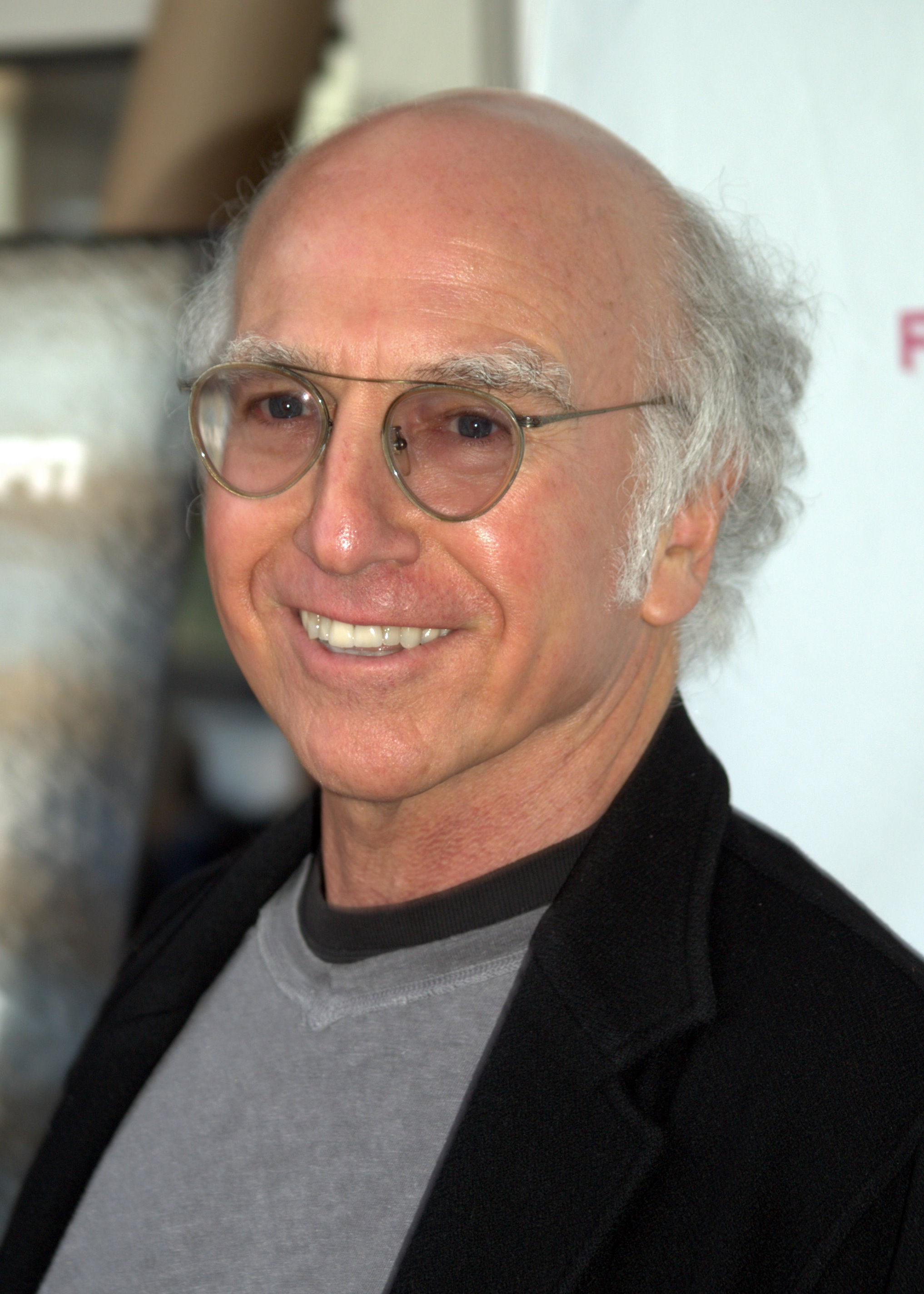
Series co-creator Larry David wrote the episode, based on a personal experience.

Series co-creator Larry David wrote the episode, which was directed by Tom Cherones. Since the start of the show, NBC executives, especially Warren Littlefield, had pressured the writing staff to get Jerry and Elaine back together. Larry David had been against this idea from the start. However, brainstorming for an episode idea, he remembered he had once made a deal with a woman to have a purely physical relationship, which he thought worthy of an episode, outside pressure or not. Later-aired season two episodes do not address Jerry and Elaine getting back together, since the season was aired largely out of order, with "The Deal" being the last episode made. They are also no longer together by season three, as Seinfeld and David decided that they had satisfied the NBC executives; on tour during production hiatus, Seinfeld also polled audience members about keeping the couple together, receiving a resounding "no". Seinfeld and David have also noted that "The Deal" is the only Seinfeld episode ever to contain sincere emotions, during the scene in which Jerry and Elaine discuss the ending of their physical relationship.

On February 25, 1991, the table-read of the episode was held, subsequent filming occurred at CBS Studio Center in Studio City, Los Angeles, California three days later. "The Deal" is the first episode in which Elaine's apartment is shown. During rehearsals controversy arose over how Jerry and Elaine would sit during their "this and that" conversation. Several producers believed that, as the scene was intimate, the two should sit close together. David, however, believed the discussion was more of a transaction than an intimate scene and felt that Jerry and Elaine should sit farther apart. On audio commentary recorded for the Seinfeld: Volume 1 DVD set, David commented that when he showed his idea of the scene, "I remember everybody saying 'there's no heat, there's no heat', and I said, that's the point, there's not supposed to be any". David and producer Andrew Scheinman got into a big argument over the issue, which David eventually won.

Aside from showing Elaine's apartment for the first time, "The Deal" also marks the first appearance of Elaine's roommate Tina, who had been mentioned in earlier episodes. Siobhan Fallon was cast in the role; she would reprise the character two more times, in season three's "The Truth" and in the season five finale "The Opposite". Norman Brenner, who worked as Richards' stand-in on the show for all its nine seasons, appears as an extra, working in the store George and Jerry visit to look for a gift for Elaine.

== Reception ==
"The Deal" was first broadcast on May 2, 1991 on NBC and received a Nielsen rating of 15.5 and an audience share of 25, indicating that 15.5 percent of American households watched the episode, and that 25 percent of all televisions in use at the time were tuned into it. With averagely 22.6 million homes watching the episode, the series was the eleventh most-watched show in the week it was broadcast, tied with NBC's The Golden Girls. David received a Primetime Emmy Award nomination for Outstanding Writing in a Comedy Series, but lost the award to Gary Dontzig and Steven Peterman, writers of the Murphy Brown episode "Jingle Hell, Jingle Hell, Jingle All the Way".

Critics reacted positively to the episode. Eric Kohanik of The Hamilton Spectator called "The Deal" a "hilarious episode". Entertainment Weekly critics Mike Flaherty and Mary Kaye Schilling commented "Jerry and Elaine's circuitous verbal dance pondering the relative worth of that [sex] versus this [the friendship] is sublime. The show's ability to be both explicit and vague will become a hallmark."
