= The Chinese Restaurant =

- Seinfeld episode
- Episode no.: Season 2 Episode 11
- Directed by: Tom Cherones
- Written by: Larry David & Jerry Seinfeld
- Production code: 206
- Original air date: May 23, 1991

Guest appearances
- James Hong as the maître d'hôtel; David Tress as Mr. Cohen; Judy Kain as Lorraine Catalano; Michael Mitz as man on phone

Episode chronology
| ← Previous "The Baby Shower" | Next → "The Busboy" |
- Seinfeld season 2

"The Chinese Restaurant" is the 11th episode of the second season of the American sitcom Seinfeld, and the 16th episode overall. Originally aired on NBC on May 23, 1991, the episode is set entirely within a Chinese restaurant as Jerry (Jerry Seinfeld), Elaine (Julia Louis-Dreyfus), and George (Jason Alexander) wait for a table. George struggles to call his girlfriend, Elaine resorts to increasingly desperate stunts to sate her hunger, and Jerry's lies to get out of dinner with his uncle come back to bite him. They are all thwarted by the maître d' (James Hong) at every turn.

Co-written by the series' creators Seinfeld and head writer Larry David and directed by Tom Cherones, the episode is set in real time, without any scene breaks. It is the first of two episodes in which Jerry's neighbor Kramer (Michael Richards) does not appear (the other being "The Pen"). It is considered a "bottle episode", and NBC executives objected to its production and broadcast due to its lack of an involved storyline, thinking that audiences would be uninterested. It was not until David threatened to quit if NBC forced any major changes upon the script that NBC allowed the episode to be produced, though NBC postponed broadcast to near the end of season two. Jason Alexander later said, "They thought this was a betrayal. They thought this was just sacrilege," adding, "To me, it was the defining beginning of the anarchy of Seinfeld."

Television critics reacted positively to "The Chinese Restaurant", widely considering it one of the show's "classic episodes". In 1998, a South Florida Sun-Sentinel critic wrote that the episode, along with season four's "The Contest", "broke new sitcom ground".

== Plot ==
Jerry, George, and Elaine go to a Chinese restaurant for dinner before a movie. They ask for a table for four, including George's girlfriend Tatiana, and the maître d'hôtel gives them a 5-10 minute wait time. Jerry is so eager to make a one-night-only showing of Plan 9 from Outer Space that he lied to get out of dinner with his uncle. Elaine is starving as she waits; George needs a payphone to call Tatiana; and Jerry recognizes a woman at a table, but cannot remember where from.

Jerry and Elaine complain when another party of four gets seated immediately. The maître d' and the hostess confer, then claim the other party arrived first.

George gets repeatedly ignored by a man who is hogging the phone, and asks for Jerry's backup if they come to blows. Elaine is still suffering, so Jerry offers her $50 to eat from the table of a group of elderly diners. She gamely goes over, but respectfully tries to buy an eggroll by sharing the money. Failing to hear her clearly, the table erupts in confusion, so she flees empty-handed. Meanwhile, another woman beats George to the phone since he was distracted. Despite his furor, he plays nice with the phone-hogger from earlier.

George finally confesses that he sabotaged his relationship with Tatiana by abruptly stopping in the middle of sex due to sudden bowel urges. Unwilling to use the close-quarters bathroom in her apartment, he hurried out without explanation, and is now desperate to make amends. Jerry and Elaine complain again when a man enters to a warm reception and gets seated. Since the man is a regular, the maître d' laughs it off. George leaves a message for Tatiana to call the restaurant.

The mystery woman recognizes and greets Jerry, and Elaine finally gets her name. Jerry realizes that she is his uncle's coworker, and that his lie will be outed to not just his uncle but his entire family. He tediously rattles off how the chain of gossip runs through his relatives.

With time running out, the group pools money to bribe the maître d'; George puts up one dollar less than the others. They stick Elaine with the task, but she fails to get the offer across even as she hands the money over. Jerry fails to ask for the money back. Elaine demands to satiate her hunger elsewhere, but refuses theater food. Meanwhile, the maître d' announces a phone call for "Cartwright", which everyone ignores. George realizes too late that this was Tatiana calling for him, only to be told he's not there.

Failing to salvage his relationship, George drops out of the evening's plans. Elaine goes to get a burger, and Jerry, giving up, goes to meet his uncle. As soon as they all leave, the maître d' calls out for them.

== Production ==
"["The Chinese Restaurant"] was the point where the network said, 'You know, we really don't understand what you're trying to do with this show, and we think it's wrong. But we're going to air it anyway.' I was thrilled that NBC took that attitude. We had done enough good things at that point that they were willing to trust us."

— Seinfeld on NBC's reaction

Larry David came up with the idea while he and Seinfeld were waiting for a table at Genghis Cohen, a Chinese restaurant in the Fairfax District of Los Angeles. David told an interviewer, "I thought this could be a pretty funny idea, waiting in real-time. You get 23 minutes to do the show; let's just have them wait 23 minutes for a table." Seinfeld said, "We were waiting for a table, and I remember him writing the idea down." When David presented the episode to NBC executives, it was not well received, as they felt there was no real story to the episode and viewers would not be interested. Executive Warren Littlefield commented that he thought there were pages missing from the script he had received. David argued that each character had a storyline: Jerry's story was he recognized a woman but did not know from where; Elaine's story was that she was very hungry; and George's story was that he was unable to use the phone. NBC disagreed and objected to the broadcast of the episode.

To satisfy the executives, staff writer Larry Charles suggested a storyline that entailed the group heading to a one-night screening of Plan 9 from Outer Space, thus introducing a "ticking clock" scenario to the story. When the NBC executives still objected, David threatened to quit the show if the network forced any major changes to the script. Seinfeld supported David and NBC eventually allowed them to produce "The Chinese Restaurant" without any significant alterations, although they strongly advised them not go through with it, and postponed the broadcast until near the end of the season.

Staff writer Spike Feresten later said that the host's calling George "Cartwright" instead of "Costanza" referenced Bonanza; "Bonanza" rhymes with "Costanza" and the show's main characters are the Cartwright family.

"The Chinese Restaurant" was first read by its cast on December 5, 1990, and it was filmed on December 11. Filming took place at CBS Studio Center in Studio City, Los Angeles, California, where all filming for the second season took place. As only one location was used, it took roughly half of the time it usually took for an episode to be filmed. Cast members have remarked that the filming was shorter than on any other episode. A few changes were made; in the first draft of the script, George, Jerry, and Elaine entered the restaurant talking about their least favorite holiday. In the version that aired, they talk about combining the jobs of policemen and garbagemen into a single job. In the original draft, the three friends also discussed how to spend the long waiting period in the future, with George suggesting they bring a deck of cards and that Jerry bring a jigsaw puzzle with nothing but penguins. One scene was cut before broadcast, featuring George explaining that he suffered a pulled hamstring in a hotel bed, with the covers tucked so tightly that he could not kick them loose. The payphone is free the whole time, but he goes for it too late. The scene was later included on the Seinfeld seasons one and two DVD boxset. George's hamstring injury was later worked into "The Limo" in season 3, and George is again tormented by tucked hotel bedcovers in "The Trip" in season 4.

At one point in the episode, Jerry mentions having a sister; however, she is never mentioned again in the series. In real life, Seinfeld has an older sister named Carolyn.

=== Cast ===
"The Chinese Restaurant" was the first episode that did not feature regular character Kramer (Michael Richards), Jerry's neighbor. David explained that the reason for Kramer's absence was because, during Seinfeld's early seasons, the character never left his apartment and did not go out with the other three. Richards was still displeased with the absence of his character, as he felt the episode was a breakthrough and, as such, essential for the series' development. In an interview for the Seinfeld first- and second-season DVD box set, he commented: "The Chinese restaurant episode was so unique, and I just wanted to be a part of that because it was cutting edge. I knew that was a very important episode; it was so odd."

Michael Mitz, who portrayed one of the payphone occupants, would return in season five as a photographer in "The Puffy Shirt". The maître d' was portrayed by James Hong; it is one of the actor's notable roles in the United States. Hong had a small part in an episode of The Bob Newhart Show, season one, in 1972, portraying a man who is mistaken for a maître d', and played a similar role to his in "The Chinese Restaurant" in the 1961 film Flower Drum Song. Judy Kain, known for a recurring role on Married... with Children, guest-starred as Lorraine Catalano, the receptionist of Jerry's uncle. David Tress guest-starred as Mr. Cohen, a guest who enters the restaurant and receives a table without reservation, as he is good friends with the maître d'. Larry David's voice can be heard among the group of elderly people from whom Elaine tries to buy an egg-roll. Norman Brenner, Richards' stand-in, appears as an extra; he is sitting by the door of the restaurant when George, Jerry, and Elaine enter, and is still at the same spot when they leave.

== Themes ==
The episode is widely considered to encapsulate Seinfeld's "show about nothing" concept, with The Tampa Tribune critic Walt Belcher calling it "the ultimate episode about nothing", and David Lavery and Sara Lewis Dunne describing it as "existential" in Seinfeld, Master of Its Domain: Revisiting Television's Greatest Sitcom. Critics had a similar reaction to season three's "The Parking Garage", in which the four central characters spent the whole episode looking for their car. The episode drags a small event out over the course of an entire episode. Lavery and Dunne suggest that this structure critiques sitcoms with implied moral lessons (such as those found in so-called "very special episodes"), in keeping with David's "no hugging and no learning" maxim. Vincent Brook, as part of his analysis regarding the influence of Jewish culture on Seinfeld, has said that the episode's theme of entrapment and confinement in a small space is a recurring scenario on the show. The relationship between the characters and food is another recurring theme of the series according to Lavery and Dunne; specific food items are associated with individual characters, and food itself is a "signifier of social contracts".

== Reception ==
"The anti-sitcom: no contrived plots, in fact no plots at all: these people can be funny just waiting to be seated."

— Jamie Malanowski, Time

When the episode first aired, it received a Nielsen rating of 11.7 (11.7% of American households watched it) and an audience share of 21 (21% of televisions in use at the time were tuned to it). Seinfeld was the eighteenth most-watched show of the week, and the sixth most-watched show on NBC. It was believed that NBC executives held a meeting after the broadcast to determine the fate of the show, and decided it would receive a third season if the writers would put more effort into episode storylines. However, the 1991 fall schedule had already been announced two days' earlier and the show was on the schedule.

"The Chinese Restaurant" received highly positive reviews from critics, and is considered one of Seinfeld's first "classic" episodes. Kit Boss, a critic for the Ocala Star-Banner, wrote that it was "like real life, but with better dialogue". Various critics and news sources have praised how the episode defines the show's "show about nothing" concept. Critics have also noted that aside from being a turning point for the show, the episode also became a turning point for television sitcoms as a whole. One South Florida Sun-Sentinel critic commented that the episode, along with "The Contest" from season four, "broke new sitcom ground and expanded the lexicon of the '90s." Vance Durgin of the Orange County Register praised how the show "wrung" so much comedy "out of a simple premise", Jennifer Armstrong of The Guardian also praised it as a groundbreaking bit of television, saying: "the Chinese Restaurant showed that a sitcom could tackle more highfalutin qualities than had ever been attempted before: this was TV’s version of Samuel Beckett’s Waiting for Godot". The episode was also included in a list compiled by The Star-Ledger called "1900–1999 The century in review – 50 events that shaped TV – and our lives". The Charlotte Observer has called "The Chinese Restaurant" "the very epitome of the classic Seinfeld format" and the series' best episode.

Critics also praised Louis-Dreyfus' and Alexander's performances; The Age critic Kenneth Nguyen stated that they "characteristically, rock[ed] their line readings". Michael Flaherty and Mary Kaye Schilling of Entertainment Weekly, who graded the episode with an A−, commented: "George is at his pressure-cooker best, but it's Elaine—famished and in high dudgeon—who is the centerpiece." David Sims of The A.V. Club gave the episode an A+, saying "it's a deftly-plotted, extremely funny example of the 'show about nothing' label that Seinfeld assigned itself".
