= Baby shower (disambiguation) =

A baby shower is a party for an expecting mother.

Baby shower or Baby Shower may also refer to:

- "Baby Shower", an episode of The Office
- "The Baby Shower" (Seinfeld)
- "The Baby Shower" (SATC episode)
