= The Baby Shower (Seinfeld) =

- Seinfeld episode
- Episode no.: Season 2 Episode 10
- Directed by: Tom Cherones
- Written by: Larry Charles
- Production code: 204
- Original air date: May 16, 1991

Guest appearances
- Christine Dunford as Leslie; Vic Polizos as Tabachnik / Agent Stone; James Lashly as Assistant; Don Perry as Bill; Margaret Reed as Mary Cantardi; Marla Fries as Stewardess; George C. Simms as FBI Man; Audrey Frantz as Party Guest

Episode chronology
← Previous "The Deal"	Next → "The Chinese Restaurant"
- Seinfeld season 2

"The Baby Shower" is the tenth episode of the second season of the NBC sitcom Seinfeld, and the show's 15th episode overall. In the episode, Elaine (Julia Louis-Dreyfus) seeks her friend Leslie's (Christine Dunford) approval by hosting her baby shower, at Jerry's (Jerry Seinfeld) apartment. This reawakens George's (Jason Alexander) old grudge against Leslie for snubbing him after ruining his shirt. Kramer (Michael Richards) pressures Jerry to join him in pirating cable.

Larry Charles wrote the episode, which was directed by Tom Cherones, and was partly based on a friend of his who was pregnant but did not want to experience childbirth. All of the characters' storylines intersect in the final scenes, an element that the writing staff would continue to use in later episodes. The episode's first broadcast in the United States on May 16, 1991 gained a Nielsen rating of 12.4/21 and was negatively received by critics.

== Plot ==
Elaine's friend Leslie, a former performance artist, is pregnant after marrying a distant cousin of the Kennedy family by marriage. This news dredges up George's old grudge over a date with Leslie, where she ruined his new shirt with a chocolate syrup spill while staging a performance in a Brooklyn warehouse, then snubbed him and never apologized. Worse, when he confronted her, all his grievances came out as bootlicking instead. Out of a need for Leslie's approval, Elaine agrees to host her baby shower. With Elaine's roommate down with both Lyme disease and Epstein–Barr virus infection at the same time, Elaine asks to use Jerry's apartment while he is performing in Buffalo. George seethes all the while in shame.

Due to a carriage dispute, Jerry has no cable TV and is reduced to searching for TV antenna signals. Kramer is paying two Russians $150 to hook up pirated cable for him, and pressures Jerry to join in. The Russians offer to do the work while Jerry is out, and Jerry, despite his paranoia, relents to Kramer's reminder of Mets games on cable.

Jerry has a nightmare that the Russians were undercover FBI agents who set him up in a sting, and he is gunned down trying to flee his apartment. He wakes up to find his flight diverted by a blizzard that has also canceled his show in Buffalo.

George is overeager to pick up Jerry at the airport, and Jerry, realizing he is wearing the ruined shirt, sees through his ulterior motive to crash the baby shower and confront Leslie. At Jerry's place, Leslie is unimpressed with Elaine currying favor with the Kennedys, as well as the party catering. Kramer brings the Russians without warning, and twists Elaine's arm to let them work through the party. The Russians help themselves to the food, fight each other, and commandeer the bathroom from the guests.

George rehearses an explosive speech releasing all his pent-up rage at Leslie, which comes to nothing when he approaches her and immediately starts toadying again. Another guest, Mary, confronts Jerry with her pent-up rage over being snubbed by him after a date three years ago, just as explosively as George planned. On her way out, Mary shoves Leslie's cake into George's shirt, doubly soiling it.

The guests leave; Elaine, left with Leslie's assessment that she has not changed since college, does not know whether to be offended. George obsequiously hauls all of Leslie's gifts for her.

Jerry backs out of the cable piracy, but offers to pay for the work. He balks when the Russians demand $400, so they smash his TV. George, Elaine, and Jerry dejectedly mope in front of the broken, staticky screen despite Kramer's invitation to watch his pirated cable.

== Production ==
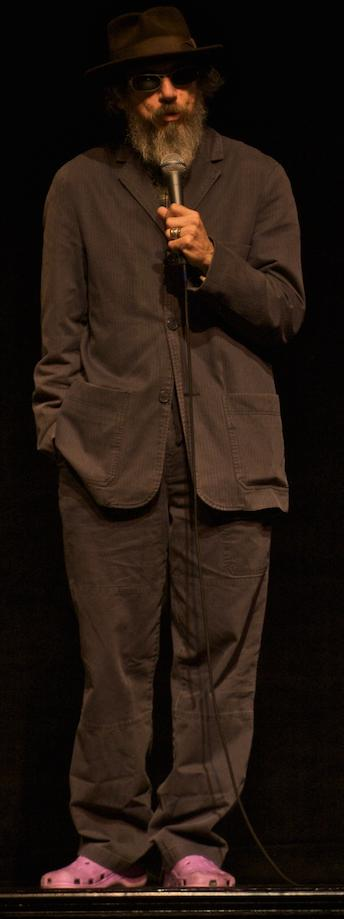
"I was extremely happy and proud with this show, and I loved the idea of doing that fantasy sequence, I loved the cinematic quality of the story where we kinda go from a plane to a fantasy sequence, and we have all these stories swirling around. I thought that it was a good template for later episodes." —Larry Charles

"The Baby Shower" was written by Larry Charles and directed by Tom Cherones, who directed all of season two's episodes. The episode was the first episode written by Charles, who would remain with the show through the fifth season. Charles had met Seinfeld co-creator Larry David and Richards when he was part of the writing staff of the ABC sketch show Fridays and David and Richards were part of the show's ensemble cast. He had been unable to write for the show's first season, as Charles had been writing for The Arsenio Hall Show during its production. Charles frequently had difficulty with writing Jerry's stand-up material; therefore, in "The Baby Shower", Seinfeld used some of his own material. The episode was a combination of loose storylines that had been brought to the writers table. Charles explained that the writing staff of the show considered it a challenge to weave together loose ideas into one episode. The episode was partly based on a friend of Charles, who was pregnant but did not want to experience childbirth and therefore asked the doctor to anesthetize her. Charles thought this was very ironic. The Leslie character was largely based on Karen Finley and Johanna Went, two performance artists who both used foods in their acts, Charles considered them "a ripe target for satire".

As Charles was always trying to find elements that were unusual in sitcoms, the episode had a scene in which Jerry dreams he is interrogated by the FBI for his illegal cable hookup, and is killed by their gunfire while trying to escape. Charles recalled the dream sequence as "one of the most ambiguous scenes we did [in season two]" and felt it was very Tarantino-like. At the end of the dream Kramer holds Jerry in his arm, stating "what have you done to my little cable boy?"; this scene had to be filmed multiple times, as it was hard for Seinfeld not to laugh when Richards said the line. In audio commentary he recorded for the Seinfeld: Volume 1 DVD set, Charles noted how he established three of the episode's four storylines in one scene, in which the characters eat and talk at Monk's Cafe. "The Baby Shower" also is one of the few episodes of season two in which the primary storylines of all four characters come together in the final scene. In "The Busboy", which had been filmed earlier, the four storylines also intersected in the final scene, but the episode aired as the final episode of season two. Charles also felt the episode defined the Kramer character more, as it is the first episode in which Kramer speaks out against the system. In addition, the episode also establishes Elaine's interest in the Kennedys, a plot element that would return later in the season four episode "The Virgin".

"The Baby Shower" was first read by the show's cast on November 14, 1990. It was filmed in front of a live audience on November 20. A technique called "Poor Man's Process" was used during the car scene with George and Jerry; one or two crew members would shake the car to give the impression that it was moving, though it never actually was. Other crew members would move lights around the set to simulate street lights or headlights of other cars. Behind the car, two lights on a wheeled stand were placed to give the impression that there was a car behind it. A cheap plastic sticker was put on Jerry's television screen to give the impression that it was broken. A number of scenes were changed or cut during production of the episode. In early drafts of the script, the episode opened with Kramer telling Jerry about the Russian cable installers. In the first draft of the script Elaine and Jerry would realize ahead of time that the baby shower and the cable installation would take place at the same time. This was changed as the writers felt it would be better left as a surprise. Some dialogue was removed from the scene, as Kramer initially told Jerry Benjamin Franklin would have wanted free cable. Additional dialogue between the baby shower guests regarding turning off men was also cut. The scene in which Mary Cantardi, a woman Jerry went out with once but never called afterwards, makes a scene at the baby shower was not in the original script, but was added during rehearsals to give Seinfeld more involvement in the final scene.

Don Perry guest starred as an airplane passenger next to Jerry, when he wakes up from his nightmare. Perry states that he might be the last person Jerry will see alive. This line was not in the original script, but was added because Perry, as Charles explained, "just had the right look". Christine Dunford was cast as Leslie, Charles commented "she just came in; gave a great reading. At this point in our show business history, I don't think we knew anybody". Dunford would return later as a saleswoman in the season five episode "The Pie". Margaret Reed, best known for her role on the soap opera As the World Turns, appeared as Mary Cantardi, a woman who screams at Jerry for not calling her back after a date. Vic Polizos and James Lashly guest-starred as the Russian cable installers. Norman Brenner, who worked as Richards' stand-in on the show for all its nine seasons, appears as an extra in the first scene of the episode, standing at the counter at Monk's Cafe.

== Reception ==
"The Baby Shower" was first broadcast in the United States on NBC on May 16, 1991. It received a Nielsen rating of 12.4 and an audience share of 21, indicating that 12.4% of American households watched the episode, and that 21% of all televisions in use at the time were tuned into it.

"The Baby Shower" met with negative responses from critics. Mike Flaherty and Mary Kaye Schilling of Entertainment Weekly graded the episode with a D, stating "After a promising opening, this baby quickly degenerates into heavy-handed farce". The episode was ranked third on a list of Seinfeld's "Not-so-top episodes", compiled by the New York Daily News.
