= Seinfeld season 2 =

Seinfeld
- Season 2
- DVD cover for seasons one and two
- Showrunner: Larry David
- Starring: Jerry Seinfeld; Julia Louis-Dreyfus; Michael Richards; Jason Alexander
- No. of episodes: 12

Release
- Original network: NBC
- Original release: January 23 – June 26, 1991

Season chronology
- ← Previous; Season 1 Next → Season 3

The second season of Seinfeld, an American television series created by Jerry Seinfeld and Larry David, began airing on January 23, 1991, on NBC.

Because of the commencement of the first Gulf War, the second season's premiere was postponed one week. The season comprised 12 episodes, and concluded its initial airing on June 26, 1991. It introduced a number of characters who played significant roles in later episodes, such as Jerry's Uncle Leo and Jerry's neighbor Newman.

Filming of the show moved from Hollywood to Studio City, Los Angeles. One episode, "The Bet", remained unfilmed, as it was considered too provocative by the network, as well as several cast and crew members. Two new writers joined the writing staff, Larry Charles and Peter Mehlman, who would continue to write for the show in later seasons. Even though season two started out with poor ratings, bringing the season to a two-month hiatus, the rest of the season was positively received by critics and was nominated for three Primetime Emmy Awards.

A Seasons 1 and 2 DVD box set was released by Sony Pictures Home Entertainment in the United States and Canada on November 23, 2004, 13 years after it completed broadcast on television. In addition to every episode from the two seasons, the DVD release features an episode from the third season that was held over, bonus material, including deleted scenes, inside looks, bloopers, and commentaries. Four million copies of the DVD were sold by the end of the year, making it one of the best-selling DVDs of all time.

== Cast ==
The show features an ensemble cast of four characters: Jerry Seinfeld stars as a fictional version of himself; Jason Alexander portrays Seinfeld's neurotic friend George Costanza; Julia Louis-Dreyfus plays Elaine Benes, Seinfeld's ex-girlfriend; and Michael Richards stars as Seinfeld's neighbor Kramer. Matthew Gilbert of The Boston Globe noted the characters' evolution during the season: "As the seasons progress, you can see Michael Richards turn Kramer [...] from a vague eccentric [...] into a stylized creation who redefined TV's quirky-neighbor type with Danny Kaye accents. You can see Julia Louis-Dreyfus [...] develop Elaine from a puffy-haired gal pal (who wasn't in the pilot) into a delightfully petty urbanite. And you can see Jason Alexander push George from 'a blatant Woody Allen impression', as the actor acknowledges, into a more offensive and hyperactive neurotic."

The season introduced several characters who returned later on the show. The episode "The Pony Remark" featured the second appearance of Helen and Morty Seinfeld, both of whom had previously appeared in the season 1 episode "The Stake Out". In "The Stake Out", Morty was portrayed by Phil Bruns; however, David and Seinfeld wanted the character to be harsher, and re-cast him with Barney Martin, who auditioned for the part on October 15, 1990, at 12:45 pm. Martin was unaware that another actor had already established the part. Helen was portrayed by Liz Sheridan, who had played her in "The Stake Out". The same episode introduced Jerry's uncle Leo, portrayed by Len Lesser, who was known for his acting in gangster films such as The Outlaw Josey Wales and Kelly's Heroes. When Lesser auditioned for the part on October 22, 1990, he incited laughs from David, Seinfeld, and casting director Marc Hirschfeld, but did not understand why, because he did not think his lines were funny. Herschfield stated that when Lesser had auditioned it was clear that he was the right actor for the part. "The Revenge" features the first appearance by Newman (voiced by David), a suicidal man who lives in Jerry's apartment building. In "The Revenge", Newman remained out of sight, although he appeared in a deleted scene. Before this scene was cut, William Thomas, Jr. had been cast for the part. Although the writing staff never intended for Newman to return to the show, the idea of having Wayne Knight as a neighbor appealed to them. Therefore, Knight was re-cast in the role of Newman for the season 3 episode "The Suicide".

== Production ==
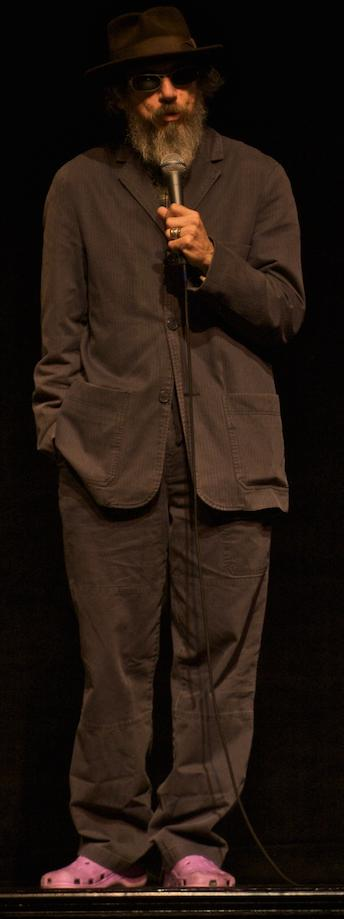
Larry Charles joined the writing staff for the season.

Seinfeld was produced by Castle Rock Entertainment, and in the United States, it aired on NBC. The producers of the show were Larry David, George Shapiro and Howard West. Tom Cherones directed all episodes of the season. Series co-creators David and Jerry Seinfeld wrote eight of the season's episodes. The writing staff was joined by Larry Charles, who wrote three episodes, and Peter Mehlman, who wrote "The Apartment".

Starting with the season premiere, filming of the show moved from Desilu Cahuenga, in Hollywood, California, to CBS Studio Center, in Studio City, Los Angeles, California. Tom Azzari worked as set designer during season two; he often re-used sets from the first season, because Castle Rock Entertainment had rented a large storage facility in which sets were stored, to save money. Although the scenes in Monk's Cafe were filmed at CBS Studio Center, the exterior of Tom's Restaurant, a diner at the intersection of Broadway and 112th Street in Manhattan, was used as the exterior for the cafe. The second season of Seinfeld was supposed to start airing on January 16, 1991, but the premiere was postponed one week because of the commencement of the first Gulf War.

=== Unfilmed episode ===
"The Bet", also known as "The Gun", is an episode that was written for the second season, but was never filmed. In the episode, Elaine bets against Jerry on the ease of buying a handgun to protect herself. In a subplot, Kramer returns from a vacation in Puerto Rico and tells Jerry and George he had sex with a flight attendant during the flight back. George makes a bet with him and goes to the airport with Jerry and Elaine to ask the flight attendant if Kramer's claim is true. Additionally, the episode would have revealed Kramer's first name as "Conrad"; his name was instead revealed as "Cosmo" in the season six episode "The Switch".

The episode was written by Charles to make a funny "dark-themed" episode, using elements that were unusual in sitcoms. Sets for the episode were built, and Bobbi Jo Lathan was cast as flight attendant Lucy Merrit and Ernie Sabella was cast as gun salesman Mo Korn, who was described in the script as "overweight, greasy, slow and low-key". The table reading of the episode was held on December 12, 1990. Louis-Dreyfus stated, "I read the script and I remember thinking 'we're not going to do this'." According to Alexander, when she read a scene in which she holds the gun to her head, asking, "Where do you want it, Jerry? The Kennedy? [holds the gun to her stomach] The McKinley?" (referencing the assassination of the two American presidents), Louis-Dreyfus turned to Alexander, stating "I'm not doing this." Both Alexander and Cherones, who would direct the episode, felt that the gun content in the story was too provocative. Richards was concerned that his character would be open about arming Elaine, though in a later interview he stated "although, why not? I think Kramer could justify the use of a weapon."

The cast began rehearsing, but after 20 minutes stopped and turned to Cherones, who agreed to talk to Charles. While on his way to Charles's office, Cherones met Castle Rock executive Glenn Padnick and informed him about the cast's reaction to the episode. Cherones said that Padnick was relieved to hear this, and they both discussed the problem with Charles, and decided not to use the script. Commenting on the episode, Charles stated "You know, it would have been an interesting show, but [...] we couldn't solve the funny problem of it. It never seemed to quite be as funny as it should be and, because of that, the balance was off and the darkness kind of enveloped it, and it could never really emerge from that darkness and become what it should have been. So, it was disappointing but also understandable." The replacement episode called "The Phone Message" was written by David and Seinfeld in two days.

== Reception ==
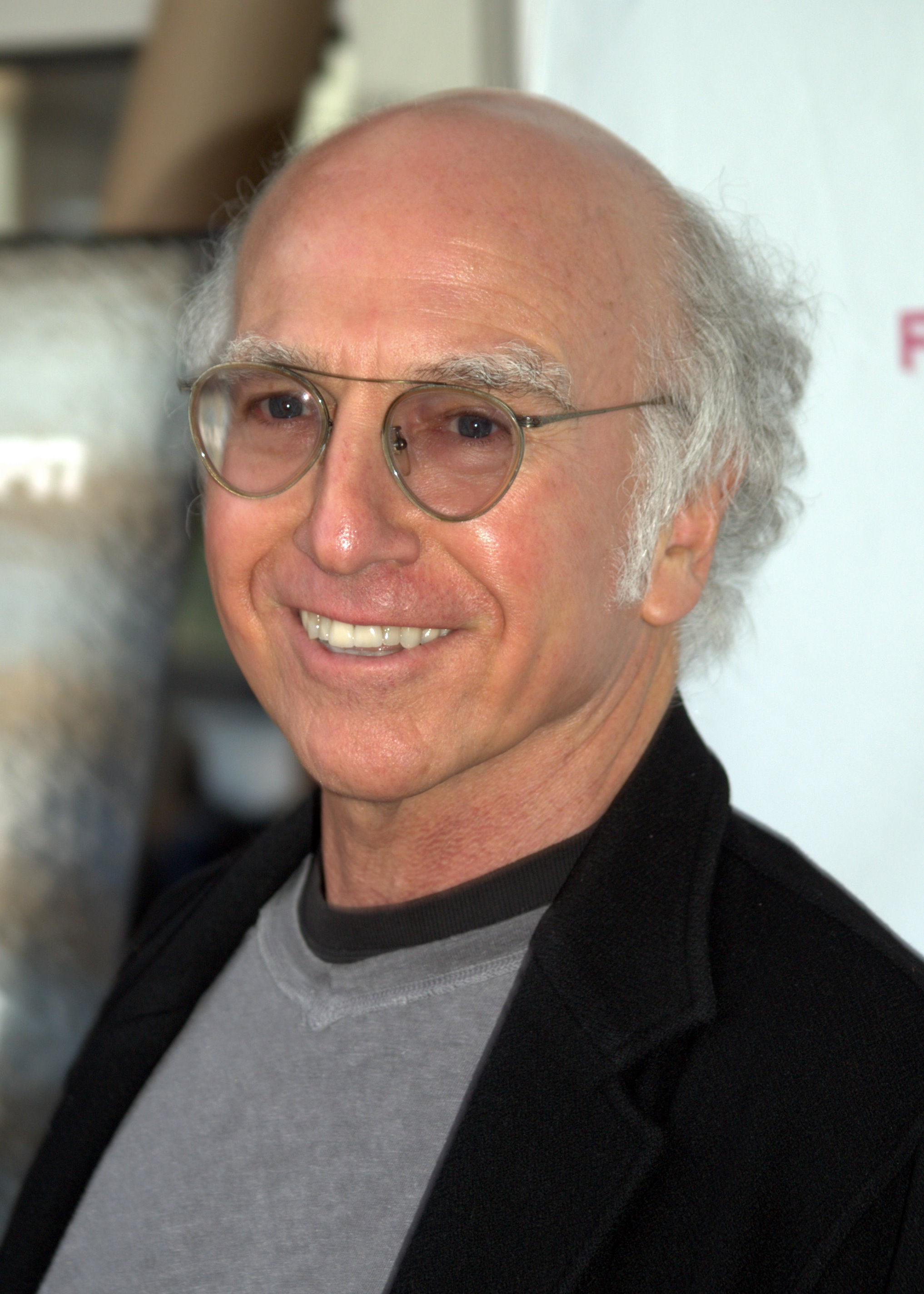
Larry David was nominated for two Emmy Awards for his work on the show.

The review aggregator website Rotten Tomatoes reported a 100% approval rating based on 17 critic reviews. The website's critics consensus reads, "Seinfeld's comedic voice gets more confident in this much-improved second season, which better utilizes its supporting players to uproarious effect."

Returning in a new timeslot, on Wednesdays at 9:30 PM, after Night Court and before Hunter, the start of season two received poor ratings, prompting NBC to put the show on hiatus for two months. When the series returned in its original time slot behind Cheers, its high ratings and increasing popularity led NBC to order the full season. Seinfeld kept a large number of Cheers' viewers; the episode "The Apartment" was watched in 15.7 million American homes, while the Cheers episode that preceded it was watched by 20.5 million American homes. Ratings for the show remained high, eventually leading to a third season pickup. Season two received three Emmy Award nominations; series co-creator Larry David and Seinfeld were nominated in the category "Outstanding Writing in a Comedy Series" for writing the episode "The Pony Remark". Cherones was nominated for "Outstanding Directing in a Comedy Series" for directing "The Pony Remark". David was also nominated for the award for writing "The Deal". Although the show did not win an Emmy, Seinfeld was praised for co-hosting the Emmy telecast.

Critics reacted positively to the season. During its 1991 Program awards, Entertainment Weekly ranked Seinfeld second place in the "Program of the year" category, behind Roseanne. Joseph P. Kahn, a critic for the Wilmington Morning Star, praised the writing and acting of the season premiere and stated, "One safe prediction, Seinfeld will be here for a good long run this time around." Writing for The Spokesman-Review, critic Jon Burlingame stated that "Seinfeld is an offbeat take on the standard sitcom concept. While rarely hilarious, it's often smart and amusing." Dave Kehr of The New York Times felt that "The Pony Remark" was a turning point for the show, noting that after the first few episodes, the show "turn[ed] into something sharp and distinctive [...] Here, suddenly, is the tight knot of guilt and denial, of hypersensitivity and sarcastic contempt that Seinfeld would explore for the next eight years." Despite the critical acclaim for the season and several of its episodes, two of the season's episodes, "The Busboy" and "The Baby Shower", were named to a list of Seinfeld's "Not-so-top episodes", compiled by the New York Daily News.

== Episodes ==
No. overall	No. in season	Title	Directed by	Written by	Original release date	Prod. code	US viewers (millions)
6	1	"The Ex-Girlfriend"	Tom Cherones	Larry David & Jerry Seinfeld	January 23, 1991	201	15.6
With Jerry's encouragement, George overcomes his girlfriend Marlene's irresistible allure and breaks up. Sent to retrieve George's books from Marlene, Jerry falls for the same irresistible allure. Jerry cannot break up with Marlene despite her dull, aimless phone calls, and worries that George will disapprove. George goes to Jerry's chiropractor, but refuses to pay the bill in full. Elaine is perturbed that a neighbor gradually became less familiar in his greetings. Kramer praises the cheap, delicious cantaloupes he got from a local grocer that accepts returned fruit.
7	2	"The Pony Remark"	Tom Cherones	Larry David & Jerry Seinfeld	January 30, 1991	202	15.2
Forced to attend elder relative Manya's anniversary dinner with his visiting parents, Jerry acts out by reviling everyone privileged to own a pony growing up. He inadvertently tars Manya with the same brush for her proud rustic upbringing in her native Poland. When Manya suddenly dies afterwards, Jerry considers skipping her funeral for he and George's softball team's championship game, while Jerry's father Marty laments giving up his cheap return airfare. Kramer boasts that he will replace all the furniture in his apartment with staired "levels", and bets Jerry dinner. At the funeral, Elaine vies to take over Manya's rent-controlled apartment.
8	3	"The Jacket"	Tom Cherones	Larry David & Jerry Seinfeld	February 6, 1991	205	14.8
Jerry is pleased with finding a new suede jacket despite its eye-watering price tag and loud, striped lining, and Kramer gets his old leather jacket as a hand-me-down. Jerry and George get dragged along as social buffers to dinner with Elaine's father Alton, a noted author, and beg off when Kramer asks for a passenger while he is double-parked to pick up a magician's doves. George, with "Master of the House" from Les Misérables stuck in his head, and Jerry are intimidated and belittled by Alton's blunt, humorless, and curt manner, but find no escape as they wait for Elaine to arrive.
9	4	"The Phone Message"	Tom Cherones	Larry David & Jerry Seinfeld	February 13, 1991	207	13.6
George passes up an invitation upstairs for coffee from his date, Carol, then kicks himself for taking the invitation literally. Convinced that he ruined his chances with her, he improvises a rambling message on her answering machine. Jerry hits it off with his own date, but turns against her because she likes a TV commercial for Dockers pants. After leaving even more disastrous messages, George is inspired by Elaine to take them back by bringing Jerry to Carol's apartment to swap her answering machine tape. Kramer offers an unsolicited joke for Jerry's act.
10	5	"The Apartment"	Tom Cherones	Peter Mehlman	April 4, 1991	208	24.7
Jerry invites Elaine to move into the newly-vacated apartment above him for cheap, bowling her over. Jerry realizes too late that he does not want Elaine visiting freely, or to have all his comings and goings within earshot of her. He gets a reprieve when Elaine gets priced out by a competing bid, but Kramer blithely volunteers Jerry to lend Elaine money to match the bid. George learns that wedding bands can attract women, so he wears Kramer's father's wedding band to a party at Elaine's friend's apartment, where he finds this newfound allure a blessing and a curse. Kramer declares that hair mousse has changed his life.
11	6	"The Statue"	Tom Cherones	Larry Charles	April 11, 1991	210	23.3
As Kramer exhumes Jerry's grandfather's effects from storage, including an old-fashioned trench coat just like Joe Friday's, George recognizes a statue matching one he dropped and broke at home as a child. George plans to use the statue to redeem himself for this disgrace. Rava, a writer, demands Elaine to edit her manuscript and secures a promotion for Elaine, while Rava's boyfriend Ray cleans Jerry's apartment. Jerry is impressed by Ray's impeccable cleaning, but the statue turns up at Ray's home after the cleaning. Ray shrugs off Jerry and George's suspicions, while Elaine tries to stay in Rava's good graces.
12	7	"The Revenge"	Tom Cherones	Larry David	April 18, 1991	212	19.6
George impulsively quits his job and burns bridges with his boss Rick Levitan, without thinking to line up another job. When George tries to go back as though nothing happened, Levitan crows that George cannot win against him. Jerry cannot find $1,500 he hid with the clothes that he took to a laundromat, and the owner takes no responsibility even when Jerry and Kramer accuse him of theft. George plots revenge by spiking Levitan's drink at an office party, with Elaine as accomplice; meanwhile, Kramer plots revenge by dumping cement in a washing machine at the laundromat.
13	8	"The Heart Attack"	Tom Cherones	Larry Charles	April 25, 1991	211	20.6
George goes to the hospital over a heart attack scare, but it turns out to be anxiety caused by a TV documentary, and Jerry and Elaine have fun at his expense over the false alarm. The attending doctor recommends a tonsillectomy, but he ends up more concerned with flirting with Elaine. Kramer sends George to a shady holistic healer, who charges much less, but his treatment sends George to the hospital again with an allergic attack. Jerry, after jotting down an amusing thought as comedy fodder in the middle of the night, seeks help to decipher his own handwriting.
14	9	"The Deal"	Tom Cherones	Larry David	May 2, 1991	213	22.9
Elaine and Jerry, both sex-deprived, become friends with benefits. Not wanting relationship drama, they make rules to relieve themselves of obligations, but George warns that they cannot have their cake and eat it too. Elaine indeed twists a rule around on Jerry when he tries to go home after sex, putting him on guard as he shops for a birthday present for her. They discover that commitment-free sex is impossible when Jerry's unromantic gift and birthday wishes prove disappointing, while Kramer upstages Jerry with gifts from the heart. Jerry must choose whether to get back together for the sake of saving their friendship.
15	10	"The Baby Shower"	Tom Cherones	Larry Charles	May 16, 1991	204	17.2
Elaine, seeking her friend Leslie's approval, hosts Leslie's baby shower. This reawakens George's old grudge against Leslie for ruining his shirt without apologizing, and his shame for being too obsequious to stand up to her. Jerry, going to Buffalo, lets the baby shower be held in his apartment, but also relents to Kramer's pressure to get pirated cable hooked up by some Russians, despite his own paranoia. When Jerry's flight is snowed out, George picks him up as an excuse to crash the baby shower and confront Leslie. Leslie is unimpressed with Elaine's ingratiation as everyone converges on Jerry's apartment.
16	11	"The Chinese Restaurant"	Tom Cherones	Larry David & Jerry Seinfeld	May 23, 1991	206	16.8
Jerry, George, and Elaine go to a Chinese restaurant for dinner before a movie. As they wait for a table, George needs a payphone to call his girlfriend Tatiana, so he can make up for leaving in the middle of sex due to bowel urges, but others will not yield the phone to him. Elaine, who is starving, goes along with increasingly desperate stunts to sate her hunger, like taking a wager to eat from another table. Jerry lied to get out of dinner with his uncle, but this comes back to bite him when his uncle's coworker recognizes him. All the while, the maître d' shrugs off their complaints when others get seated first.
17	12	"The Busboy"	Tom Cherones	Larry David & Jerry Seinfeld	June 26, 1991	203	12.5
As Jerry, George, and Elaine have dinner, a busboy accidentally lights a menu on fire, and gets fired after George informs the manager. Feeling sorry, George tracks down the ex-busboy, Antonio, to make amends, but makes matters worse when he and Kramer let Antonio's cat out. Elaine is smug that Eddie, an admirer from Seattle, is staying with her for a week, but quickly falls out of love and becomes hellbent on seeing Eddie off to the airport punctually. Despite obsessive planning, Elaine and Eddie oversleep and Elaine maniacally races against time to avoid another day with him.
