= The Ex-Girlfriend =

- Seinfeld episode
- Episode no.: Season 2 Episode 1
- Directed by: Tom Cherones
- Written by: Larry David; Jerry Seinfeld
- Production code: 201
- Original air date: January 23, 1991

Guest appearances
- Tracy Kolis as Marlene; Karen Barcus as Receptionist

Episode chronology
← Previous "The Stock Tip"	Next → "The Pony Remark"
- Seinfeld season 2

"The Ex-Girlfriend" is the first episode of the second season of the American television sitcom Seinfeld (and the sixth episode overall). It first aired on NBC in the United States on January 23, 1991, after being postponed for a week due to the start of the First Gulf War. In the episode, George Costanza breaks up with his girlfriend Marlene and leaves some books in her apartment. He persuades his friend Jerry to retrieve them. Jerry starts dating Marlene, who annoys him as much as she did George, but he finds himself unable to break up with her because she has a "psycho-sexual" hold on him.

Co-written by series creators Larry David and Jerry Seinfeld, the episode was inspired by one of David's personal experiences. Directed by Tom Cherones, "The Ex-Girlfriend" was the first episode of the show filmed at CBS Studio Center in Los Angeles, California (and would stay there for the remainder of the show's run), the previous season having been filmed at Desilu Cahuenga in Hollywood. The episode received a Nielsen rating of 10.9/17 and was positively received by critics.

== Plot ==
George seeks Jerry's encouragement to break up with his girlfriend, Marlene, rationalizing that he was powerless to resist her. Elaine is perturbed that a neighbor, over two years, became gradually less familiar in his greetings to the point of non-acknowledgement. Jerry suggests that George take action, and George does the same for Elaine.

Kramer praises a delicious, cheap cantaloupe from a local grocer who accepts returned fruit, despite Jerry's disinterest. George ecstatically recounts his determined breakup with Marlene as a thrilling prison escape, but needs Jerry's help to reclaim some books left at her apartment. Jerry is mesmerized by Marlene and begins dating her, becoming inundated by her frequent, lengthy phone calls that often turn into dull, aimless conversations.

George visits Jerry's chiropractor, but, outraged at a $75 charge for a two-minute consultation, refuses to pay the full amount.

After making out with Marlene, Jerry loses his resolve to break up, but fears George's reaction. He rationalizes to Kramer that he was powerless to resist her, then is encouraged by Elaine's bold telling-off of her neighbor. Kramer returns Jerry's supermarket cantaloupe, finding it unpalatable.

George is indifferent to Jerry continuing with Marlene, but is appalled when Jerry covers the difference on his chiropractor bill, undermining his protest. In his indignation, he swallows a fly.

Marlene breaks up with Jerry after judging his comedy act as lacking substance. Jerry reacts defensively at being condescended to by Marlene, a cashier.

== Cultural references ==
The episode contains a number of pop culture references. Elaine mentions that a man she knows used to nod at her whenever she saw him, but suddenly stopped, leading her to state, "[...] he went from nods to nothing." This prompts George to hum the Tony Bennett song "Rags to Riches," replacing the chorus with "nods to nothing". During a discussion with Elaine, Jerry mentions the 1958 film The Blob. Jerry also mentions the novel Moby Dick, jokingly stating that "when you read Moby Dick the second time, Ahab and the whale become good friends". After George receives a bill from his chiropractor, he states "75 bucks? What, am I seeing Sinatra in there?"

== Production ==
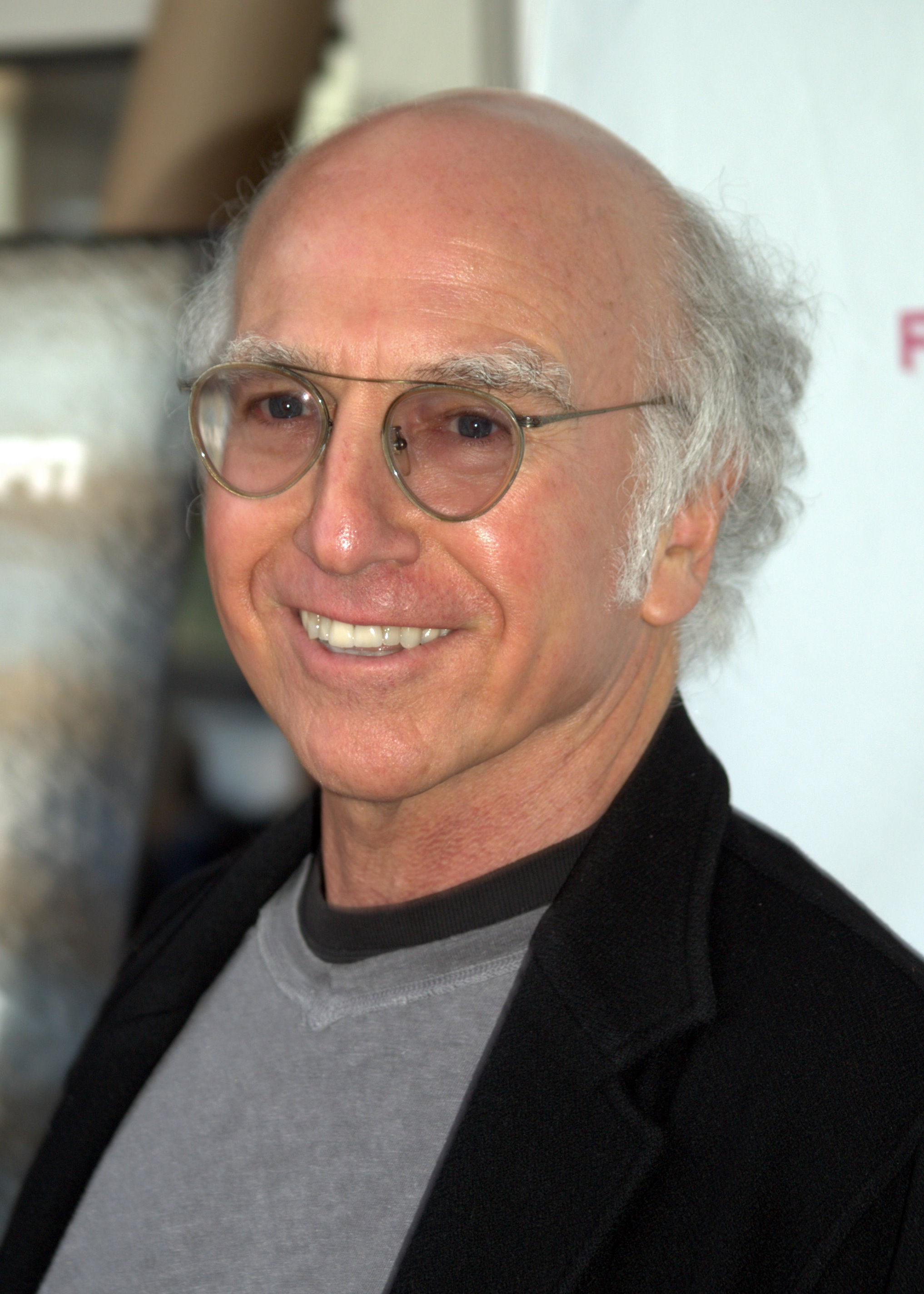
Seinfeld co-creator Larry David co-wrote the episode.

The episode was written by series co-creators Larry David and Jerry Seinfeld and directed by Tom Cherones. David based the story on a personal experience of his, when he gave a ride home to a woman who had recently dated a friend of his. He would frequently come up with the idea for an episode and make it into a teleplay with Seinfeld's help; in a 1991 interview with the Los Angeles Times, Seinfeld stated: "Most of the stories are from [David's] life. He just has a tremendous wellspring of ideas. I mean, he just fills notebooks with ideas and I try to help him, but Larry is really the designer of the show." David Sims of The A.V. Club commented, "Seinfeld started its second season, its first real season after a four-episode test run, very strongly with 'The Ex-Girlfriend', and it is the first time we really see George as the character we know and love, that weird dark shadow of Larry David's mind who behaves as no functioning human being honestly could."

Among the actresses who auditioned for the part of Marlene were Amy Yasbeck; Jeri Ryan, who would go on to star in Star Trek: Voyager; and Heidi Swedberg. Swedberg was later cast as Susan Ross for Seinfeld's fourth season. Tracy Kolis, who at the time was known for her appearance in the soap opera All My Children, was eventually cast for the part. She reappeared later in the season six episode "The Soup", in which she portrayed a waitress named Kelly. Norman Brenner, who worked as Michael Richards' stand-in on the show for all nine seasons, appears as an extra during the second scene, walking by twice in different clothing.

The first table read of the episode took place on October 17, 1990. It was filmed in front of a studio audience six days later, on October 23. Seinfeld's stand-up performances were filmed on October 29, 1990, along with the performances used in "The Pony Remark" and "The Busboy". Filming of the episode took place on stage 19 of the CBS Studio Center in Studio City, Los Angeles. "The Ex-Girlfriend" was the first episode to be filmed there, as the majority of season one was filmed in a studio called Desilu Cahuenga, in Hollywood, where The Dick Van Dyke Show had also been filmed. Tom Azzari designed the sets for the second season of the show, and was able to re-use various sets from the first season, thanks to Castle Rock Entertainment's decision to store them in a large storage facility. The chiropractor's waiting room, in which George believes he was charged too much for a visit, was the only new set which appeared in the episode.

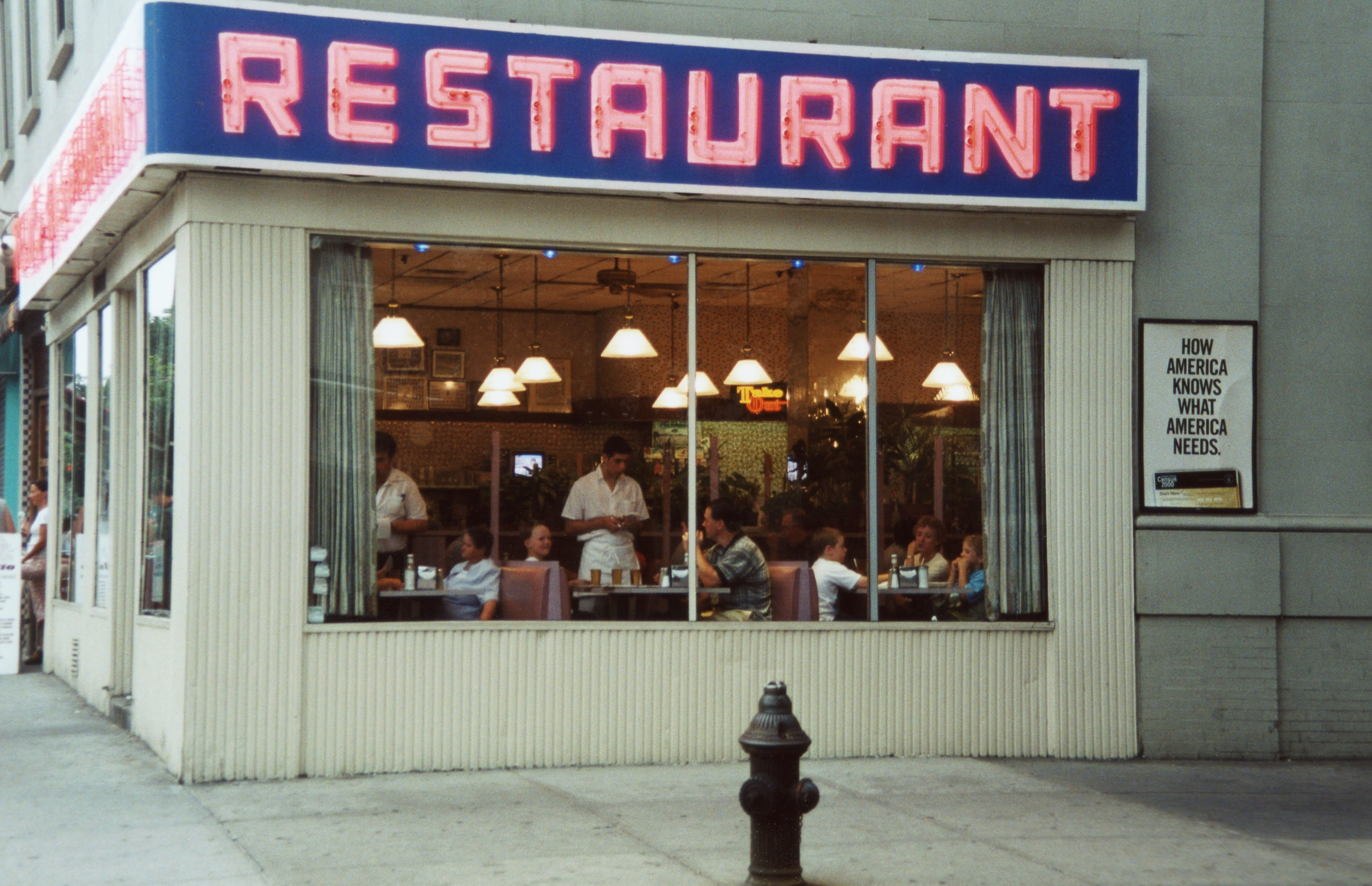
Tom's Restaurant, a real diner in New York, served as the exterior for Monk's Cafe.

Although the scenes in Monk's Cafe were filmed at the CBS Studio Center, the exterior of Tom's Restaurant, a diner at Broadway and 112th Street in Manhattan was used as the exterior for the cafe. The second scene of the episode, which takes place on a street, was filmed on CBS Studio Center's "New York Street", a set that consists of four very small store fronts. During seasons one to five, "New York Street" was the only set the writers could use to replicate New York City. This scene, and additional scenes which take place in Jerry's car, were filmed on October 22 from 5:00 to 8:30 p.m. One or two members of the crew shook the car to give the impression that it was moving, though it never actually was. Other crew members would move lights around the set to simulate street lights or headlights of other cars. Behind the car, two lights on a wheeled stand were placed to give the impression that there was a car behind it. This technique is called "poor man's process", because it is cheaper than other ways of achieving the effect. The show had previously experimented with this technique in the season one episode "The Stake Out".

Some scenes in the episode were cut prior to broadcast. The opening scene in Jerry's car, in which George discusses breaking up with Marlene, originally had George proposing that he would stage his own kidnapping while walking down the street with Marlene, then hide out until she had given up on him. Although it was cut before the episode's broadcast, this scene was included on the Seinfeld Volume 1 DVD set. Another scene which was cut featured Jerry's neighbor Kramer entering Jerry's apartment carrying a plate with cantaloupe on toothpicks. Originally, the scene in which Jerry tells George that he is dating Marlene took place in a library, with a librarian repeatedly shushing George and Jerry and kicking them out of the library at the end of the scene. The location was changed to Monk's Cafe because the dialogue had nothing to do with a library.

== Reception ==
"The Ex-Girlfriend" was first broadcast on NBC on January 23, 1991, after being postponed for one week due to the start of the First Gulf War. The episode gained a Nielsen rating of 10.9 and an audience share of 17, meaning that 10.9% of American households watched the episode and 17% of all televisions in use at the time were tuned into it. Although Seinfeld would be considered a hit show by today's standards, NBC was disappointed with its ratings, and, after three weeks, put the show on a two-month break.

Critics reacted positively to the episode. Joseph P. Kahn, a critic for the Wilmington Morning Star, called the episode's writing and acting "anything but hackneyed" and stated, "One safe prediction, Seinfeld will be here for a good long run this time around (referring to how its first season only had five episodes)." Joyce Millman of Salon.com stated that she disliked Seinfeld's pilot episode, but after seeing a scene from "The Ex-Girlfriend" in which Jerry and Kramer discuss returning fruit, she was "awed by Seinfeld and co-creator/writer Larry David's brilliant grasp of, A) working-class Jewish craziness, and, B) the absurd humor of the deeply mundane."

In a review of the episode, Jon Burlingame of The Spokesman-Review stated, "Seinfeld is an offbeat take on the standard sitcom concept. While rarely hilarious, it's often smart and amusing." In his review of the episode, Chicago Tribune critic Rick Kogan stated, "Hip without posing, it delivers its comedy in sharp and spectacular style".

Mike Flaherty and Mary Kaye Schilling of Entertainment Weekly called "The Ex-Girlfriend" "The series' most multifaceted (if not most engaging) narrative so far", and graded it with a B. David Sims gave the episode an A, writing, "George is really the most revolutionary character: he's often repulsive and pathetic, but here these are traits we heartily enjoy and sympathize with and want more of... The best thing about this episode is that Jerry almost immediately getting with George's ex-girlfriend creates no drama in the group, though it would on almost any other sitcom."

A relatively negative review came from Chicago Sun-Times critic Lon Grahnke, who criticized Seinfeld's part in the episode: "[..]this comedy series must ride on the shoulders of its star. And Seinfeld spends too much time shrugging". He also noted Dreyfus was not granted screentime, as opposed to Richards, whose acting performances he described as "get[ting] tiresome". Overall, Grahnke commented "At his best, Seinfeld draws a chuckle or two from his middle-brow remarks on modern life and its perplexing contradictions. At his worst, the comedian shows the smugness of a detached star who can mechanically control the level of laughter that greets whatever quip he may utter."
