= The Pony Remark =

- Seinfeld episode
- Episode no.: Season 2 Episode 2
- Directed by: Tom Cherones
- Written by: Larry David; Jerry Seinfeld
- Production code: 202
- Original air date: January 30, 1991

Guest appearances
- Liz Sheridan as Helen Seinfeld; Barney Martin as Morty Seinfeld; Len Lesser as Uncle Leo; Rozsika Halmos as Manya; David Fresco as Isaac; Scott N. Stevens as Intern; Earl Boen as Eulogist

Episode chronology
← Previous "The Ex-Girlfriend"	Next → "The Jacket"
- Seinfeld season 2

"The Pony Remark" is the second episode of the second season of the American television sitcom Seinfeld (and the seventh episode overall). It first aired on NBC in the United States on January 30, 1991, and was written by series co-creators Jerry Seinfeld and Larry David, based on a remark David once made.

In this episode, Jerry, attending an elder relative's wedding anniversary, makes a remark reviling kids who owned ponies. He unwittingly offends the relative, a first-generation Polish immigrant, and becomes obliged to attend her funeral soon after.

The episode marked the first appearance of Jerry's uncle Leo, who became a recurring character on the show. Leo was played by Len Lesser. The episode also marked the first appearance of Barney Martin as Morty Seinfeld, replacing Phil Bruns, who had portrayed Morty in the season 1 episode "The Stake Out". "The Pony Remark" had a Nielsen rating of 10.7/16, and received positive responses from critics; The New York Times considers the episode to have been a turning point for the show.

== Plot ==
Jerry's parents Helen and Morty are visiting again, to attend Helen's cousin Manya's 50th wedding anniversary. Jerry returns triumphantly from a softball game, where his winning play advanced the team to the championship, and declares it the greatest moment of his life. Helen obliges him to attend the anniversary, and he, in turn, is obliged to bring Elaine along since they have already made plans.

Kramer boasts that he will replace all the furniture in his apartment with stair-like "levels" made of lumber and carpeted with pillows. Jerry confidently wagers that this will never happen, and Kramer bets him dinner, giving himself until the end of the month.

At the anniversary dinner, Elaine quietly suffers sitting at the diminutive kids' table. Jerry, despite anticipating that Uncle Leo would accost him as always with cousin Jeffrey's exploits in the Parks and Recreation department, cannot escape Leo's arm-lock. Hearing that a relative is marrying a racehorse owner, Jerry and Elaine mock the ostentation of horse and pony ownership. Jerry reviles all kids who grew up owning ponies, not realizing that he tarred Manya with the same brush. Manya proudly retorts that, growing up in her native Poland, ponies were common to all. Manya indignantly retires from dinner as Jerry backpedals, then makes prolonged excuses for his ignorance.

Kramer gives up his project before even starting—but also uses this as his excuse to welsh on the bet. Uncle Leo phones with news of Manya's death, forcing Jerry to call his parents back as they leave for the airport. Despite nobody calling him out, Jerry denies causing Manya's death and disowns any obligation to attend the funeral. With the funeral overlapping his championship game, Elaine obliges him to attend. In contrast, George obliges him to go to the game, having no other left fielder on their team. They contemplate whether the dead attend funerals "in spirit", when they could instead transcend the material world.

At the funeral, Jerry is humbled by the eulogizer celebrating the memory of Manya's pony, the "pride of Kraków". Manya's husband, Isaac, is unruffled by the pony remark, so Elaine aggressively asks to take over his and Manya's rent-controlled apartment. After getting sidetracked on his own move to Phoenix, Isaac finally answers that cousin Jeffrey is moving in. Morty, chafing at giving up his cheap, non-refundable return airfare, harasses his medical school-graduate nephew for a fraudulent doctor's note to avoid paying the full price for fares.

Sudden rain delays the championship game, giving Jerry a reprieve. However, in the game, he repeatedly bungles his base running and even gets picked off. As Jerry declares this the worst moment of his life, Elaine wonders if Manya cursed his plays in revenge.

== Production ==
This episode was written by series creators Larry David and Jerry Seinfeld and directed by Tom Cherones. This episode was based on a remark David once made during a conversation. Cherones deliberately made Elaine sit at a smaller table while directing the dinner scene. "The Pony Remark" was the first episode in which Kramer wants to gamble; it is later established that he has a gambling addiction. The idea of Elaine asking Isaac what is going to happen with his old apartment was added during rehearsals. The first table reading of the episode was held on October 24, 1990, and a run-through was held two days later. "The Pony Remark" was filmed in front of a live audience on October 30, 1990, while Seinfeld's stand-up routine was filmed one day earlier, along with the performances used in "The Ex-Girlfriend" and "The Busboy"; Seinfeld changed wardrobe between takes.

"The Pony Remark" featured the second appearance of Helen and Morty Seinfeld, who had previously appeared in the season 1 episode "The Stake Out". In "The Stake Out," Morty was portrayed by Phil Bruns, but David and Seinfeld decided they wanted the character to be harsher and re-cast him with Barney Martin, who auditioned for the part on October 15, 1990, at 12:45 PM. Martin was unaware that another actor had already established the part. Helen was portrayed by Liz Sheridan; in an early draft of the episode, her name was Adele, though this did not match her name from "The Stake Out". It was later changed back to Helen. The episode also introduced Jerry's uncle Leo, portrayed by Len Lesser, who was known for his acting in gangster films, as well as The Outlaw Josey Wales and Kelly's Heroes. When Lesser auditioned for the part on October 22, 1990, he got a lot of laughs from David, Seinfeld and casting director Marc Herschfield, but did not understand why, because he did not think his lines were funny. Herschfield stated that Lesser was the right actor for the part when Lesser had auditioned. David Fresco guest starred in the episode as Isaac. Fresco had some difficulty with his lines in the episode, and would sometimes burst into laughter during filming. Other actors who guest-starred in the episode were Rozsika Halmos, who portrayed Manya, and Milt Oberman, who played the funeral director.

== Reception ==
"The Pony Remark" was first broadcast on American television on January 30, 1991. It gained a Nielsen rating of 10.7 and an audience share of 16. This means that 10.7% of American households watched the episode, and that 16% of all televisions in use at the time were tuned into it. The episode gained two Primetime Emmy Award nominations; Seinfeld and David were nominated for Outstanding Writing in a Comedy Series and Cherones was nominated for Outstanding Directing in a Comedy Series. Though the episode did not win either of its Emmy nominations, Seinfeld was praised for co-hosting the Emmy telecast.

Dave Kehr of The New York Times felt that "The Pony Remark" was a turning point for the show, stating that, after the first few episodes, the show "turn[ed] into something sharp and distinctive [...] Here, suddenly, is the tight knot of guilt and denial, of hypersensitivity and sarcastic contempt that Seinfeld would explore for the next eight years." Holly Ordway of DVD Talk considered the episode the best episode of Seinfeld's second season. "The Pony Remark" is considered one of Seinfeld's "classic episodes". Writing for Entertainment Weekly, critics Mike Flaherty and Mary Kaye Schilling called the episode "Seinfeld at its mordant best" and graded it with an A−.

In the book Something Ain't Kosher Here: The Rise of the "Jewish" Sitcom, Vincent Brook analyzed the episode, saying, "Jerry is made to feel guilty for his 'lethal' pony remark, whence the episode's macabre humor; yet the moral in terms of ethno-spatial identity is clear. In its violent rejection of Manya, Seinfeld has driven descent-based ethnicities (and their legacy of privation and self-sacrifice) off the face of the earth, and literally off the air. There is no place for traditional Jewishness in the hedonistic Seinfeld world, "The Pony Remark" vociferously proclaims."

David Sims of The A.V. Club gave the episode an A, calling it a "classic" and writing that it "is so damn clever in how it bonds Jerry's fears about social niceties with larger fears about mortality;" he also praised Louis-Dreyfus's acting, saying that Elaine "has an amusingly stark little bit of dialogue about death midway through the episode: 'You know, funerals always make me think about my own mortality and how I'm actually going to die someday. Me, dead. Imagine that!' I think it's probably Louis-Dreyfus' best moment of the show so far, because she's really starting to nail Elaine's declarative, vaguely imperious, self-centered tone." He also admired "the estimable Barney Martin in his first appearance as Jerry's irascible dad."
