= Larry Charles =

American television writer, director and producer

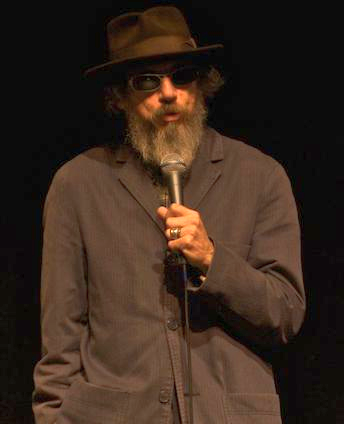
- Charles in 2008
- Born: Lawrence Charles Wengrod; 1956 (age 69–70); New York City, U.S.
- Other name: Sergei Petrov
- Occupations: Screenwriter; director; producer
- Years active: 1970s–present
- Children: Pearl Charles

Lawrence Charles Wengrod (born 1956), known professionally as Larry Charles, is an American screenwriter, director, and producer. He was a staff writer for the sitcom Seinfeld for its first five seasons. He has also directed the documentary film Religulous and the mockumentary comedy films Borat, Brüno, and The Dictator. His Netflix documentary series Larry Charles' Dangerous World of Comedy premiered in 2019.

== Early life ==
Charles was born in Brooklyn, New York City, and raised in a Jewish family in Trump Village in Coney Island. His father was a World War II veteran who went to the American Academy of Dramatic Arts on the GI Bill and was a stand-up comic named Sy Coe the Psychotic Neurotic. Charles attended Rutgers University, but dropped out to pursue writing and comedy.

== Career ==
=== Early career ===
Charles performed stand-up comedy during the 1970s until he was hired to write for the short-lived sketch comedy show Fridays, where he worked with Larry David. This began Charles's career in television writing that included The Arsenio Hall Show and eventually Seinfeld. David gave him the job as a writer on Seinfeld and his directorial debut on Curb Your Enthusiasm.

=== Seinfeld ===
Although series co-creators Larry David and Jerry Seinfeld wrote the bulk of the show's episodes during the early seasons, Charles was their second in command during this period. Charles had met Seinfeld co-creator David when he was part of the writing staff of the ABC sketch show Fridays, on which David and Michael Richards were also part of the show's ensemble cast. Charles had been unable to write for the show's first season, as he had been writing for The Arsenio Hall Show.

Charles is noted for contributing some of the show's darker storylines and scenes. In the season two episode "The Baby Shower" Charles wrote a dream sequence in which the title character, Jerry Seinfeld, was killed. Charles's episodes also covered such controversial topics as Nazis (in "The Limo"), a psychotic stalker (in "The Opera") and a hospital patient committing suicide (in "The Bris"). A season two episode he wrote, "The Bet", concerning Elaine buying a handgun to protect herself, was never filmed because NBC, some of the cast, and the show's director felt the gun content was too provocative. Charles claimed that his writing on Seinfeld was heavily influenced by Dragnet, Superman and Abbott and Costello.

Charles said he was instrumental in the development of Cosmo Kramer. He felt that "Jerry and George were so well-defined through Larry David and Jerry, that there was less room for me to, sort of, expand on those personas. But Kramer was very unformed at the beginning of the show and it gave me an area of creativity to, sort of, expand upon. So I spent a lot of time with Kramer because he was a character that I could have an impact on in the future of the show". It was Charles who imbued in Kramer a distrust of authority (especially in his episodes "The Baby Shower" and "The Heart Attack"), and who created the character of Kramer's notorious unseen friend Bob Sacamano, after his real-life friend of the same name.

=== Film ===
Charles's feature debut was Masked and Anonymous (2003) which he directed, and co-wrote with Bob Dylan (under the pseudonyms Sergei Petrov and Rene Fontaine, respectively). The film received a mixed reaction from audiences and critics alike; it did poorly at the box office. Charles maintains it takes many viewings to get true enjoyment from the film: "I want the movie to be like a great Bob Dylan song that is listened to over and over and for people to [go] back and see it again and get a lot more things, or totally different things."

His second feature film as director, the Sacha Baron Cohen comedy mockumentary Borat, was much more successful; it "set new records in terms of profitability; on a budget of 18 million dollars, it grossed in excess of 261 million dollars." In an interview, Charles discussed how, because of the nature of the mockumentary process, he had to act as well, even if none of his performance made it to the screen: "We all, especially me, had to play a character as well. I wasn't Larry Charles when we were on the road. We all had to be in character, and we had to balance that with our aesthetic and logistical needs to produce the movie properly...The director also had to act." The film was nominated for Best Motion Picture—Musical or Comedy at the Golden Globes.

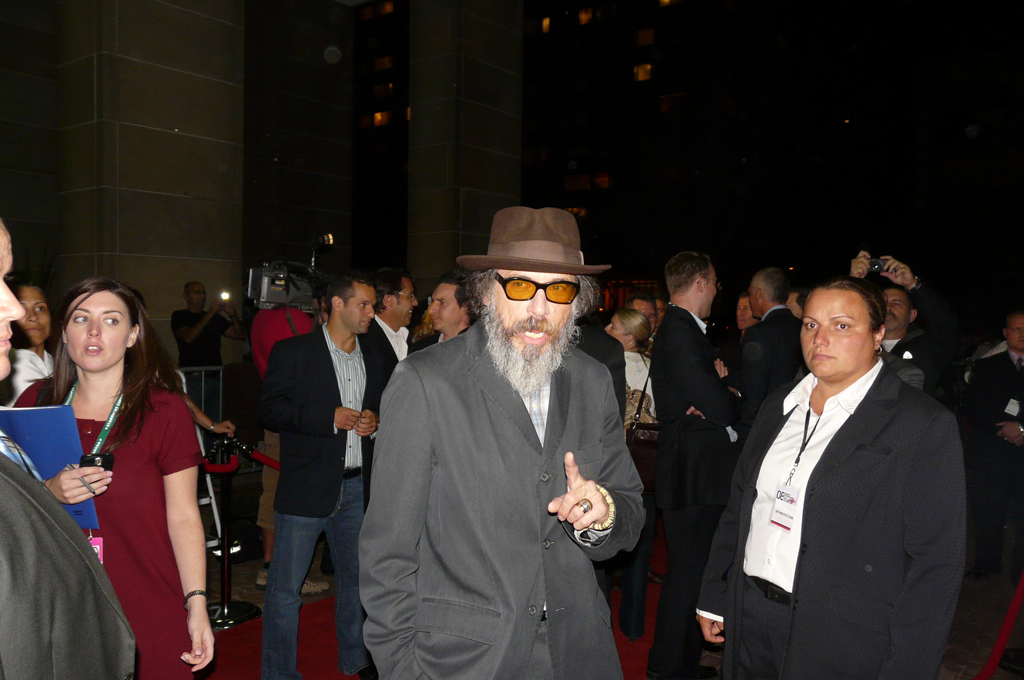
Talking with fans outside TIFF premiere of Religulous, 2008

Charles's third film was Religulous—a documentary about Bill Maher's take on the state of contemporary religion—which was released in October 2008.

Charles directed an unreleased biography of Larry David, set to be released on March 1, 2022, titled The Larry David Story. A few hours prior to its scheduled release, the film was postponed; according to HBO, this was at David's request. In a podcast appearance with Marc Maron on October 5, 2023, Charles described the documentary as the result of a four-hour conversation, adding that he had not spoken to David since the release was canceled.

=== Live performances ===
Charles rarely performs live, but has appeared at Un-Cabaret and can be heard on several of its podcasts.

== Filmography ==
=== Film ===
Title	Year	Director	Writer	Notes
Masked and Anonymous	2003	Yes	Yes	
Borat	2006	Yes		
Religulous	2008	Yes		Documentary
Brüno	2009	Yes		
The Dictator	2012	Yes		
Army of One	2016	Yes		
Dicks: The Musical	2023	Yes		

=== Television ===
Title	Year	Credited as			Notes
Title	Year	Director	Writer	Producer	Notes
Fridays	1980–1982		Yes		53 episodes
Monsters	1989		Yes		Episode: "Taps"
The Arsenio Hall Show	1990–1992		Yes		19 episodes
Seinfeld	1991–1994		Yes	Supervising	18 episodes; also various cameos and executive story editor
Mad About You	1995–1997		Yes	Executive	19 episodes
Dilbert	1999–2000		Yes	Executive	3 episodes; also co-developer
Curb Your Enthusiasm	2000–2017	Yes		Executive	19 episodes
The Tick	2001–2002		Yes	Executive	2 episodes
Entourage	2004–2009		Yes	Executive	4 episodes; also cameo in "New York"
New Girl	2012	Yes			Episode: "Katie"
Mixology	2014	Yes			Episode: "Tom & Maya"
The Comedians	2015	Yes	Yes	Executive	Directed 9 episodes, wrote episode: "Pilot"; also co-developer
Larry Charles' Dangerous World of Comedy	2019	Yes		Executive	

=== Seinfeld ===
		Episodes of Seinfeld written by Larry Charles
Season	Episode	Info
2	"The Baby Shower"	Charles has stated about this episode: "I was extremely happy and proud with this show, and I loved the idea of doing that fantasy sequence, I loved the cinematic quality of the story where we kinda go from a plane to a fantasy sequence, and we have all these stories swirling around. I thought that it was a good template for later episodes."
2	"The Statue"	
2	"The Heart Attack"	According to the Seinfeld Notes, Charles's own tonsils grew back in real life, just as George's do in the episode.
3	"The Library"	The 'Inside Look' feature on the Seinfeld Season 3 DVD features Charles in an interview, talking about how he wanted to create a Jack Webb/Dragnet-style police monologue in a sitcom format, which was the inspiration for Lt. Bookman in this episode.
3	"The Subway"	
3	"The Fix-Up"	Charles and Elaine Pope won the award for Outstanding Writing for a Comedy Series at the 1992 Emmy Awards for this episode.
3	"The Limo"	
3	"The Keys"	
4	"The Trip Part 1"	
4	"The Trip Part 2"	Charles appears in a cameo alongside David on the far right of the screen next to the police when the authorities show up at Kramer's apartment in Los Angeles to arrest him for murder.
4	"The Opera"	
4	"The Airport"	Charles appears in a brief cameo as the passenger who vacates the plane's lavatory, leaving a foul stench that Elaine Benes must endure as she uses the lavatory while holding her breath.
4	"The Outing"	Charles was nominated for Outstanding Individual Achievement in Writing in a Comedy Series at the 1993 Emmys for this episode.
4	"The Old Man"	
5	"The Bris"	
5	"The Stall"	
5	"The Fire"	

Charles also has a cameo in the episode titled "The Parking Garage," which was written by David.

=== Mad About You ===
In 1995, Charles left the writing staff of Seinfeld to join that of another hugely successful mid-1990s sitcom: Paul Reiser's Mad About You.

		Episodes of Mad About You written by Larry Charles
Season	Episode	Info
4	"Fertility"	
4	"The Procedure"	
4	"The Weed"	Co-written with Billy Grundfest
4	"The Award"	Co-written with Seth Kurland and Ron Darian
4	"The Finale (1)"	Co-written with Billy Grundfest and Victor Levin
4	"The Finale (2)"	Co-written with Billy Grundfest, Victor Levin, and Paul Reiser
4	"The Finale (3)"	Co-written with Billy Grundfest, Victor Levin, and Paul Reiser
5	"Dr. Wonderful"	Co-written with Victor Levin
5	"The Grant"	Co-written with Richard Day, Victor Levin and Jenji Kohan
5	"Burt's Building"	Co-written with Victor Levin and Ron Darian
5	"The Gym"	Co-written with Richard Day and Victor Levin
5	"Chicken Man"	Co-written with Ron Darian and Jonathan Leigh Solomon
5	"Astrology"	Co-written with Jenji Kohan
5	"The Penis"	Co-written with Richard Day and Maria Semple
5	"On The Road"	Co-written with Richard Day and Paul Reiser
5	"The Dry Run"	Co-written with David Guarascio and Moses Port
5	"The Birth (1)"	
5	"The Birth (2)"	

=== The Tick, Dilbert ===
Charles served as executive producer on two short-lived programs, The Tick (for which he wrote two episodes), and the Dilbert animated series, which he co-developed with Scott Adams and co-wrote the following episodes:

Season	Title	Notes
1	"The Name"	Co-written with Scott Adams
1	"The Takeover"	Co-written with Scott Adams and Ned Goldreyer
1	"Little People"	Co-written with David Silverman, Stephen Sustarsic, and Scott Adams
1	"The Knack"	Co-written with Ned Goldreyer and Scott Adams
1	"Y2k"	Co-written with Andrew Borakove, Rachel Powell, and Scott Adams
1	"Charity"	Co-written with Stephen Sustarsic, David Silverman, and Scott Adams
1	"Holiday"	Co-written with Ned Goldreyer, Stephen Sustarsic, David Silverman, and Scott Adams
1	"The Infomercial"	Co-written with Ned Goldreyer and Scott Adams
2	"Art"	Co-written with Ned Goldreyer and Scott Adams
2	"The Dupey"	Co-written with Scott Adams
2	"The Merger"	Co-written with Scott Adams
2	"Hunger"	Co-written with Scott Adams
2	"The Assistant"	Co-written with Mark Steen, Ron Nelson, and Scott Adams
2	"The Return"	Co-written with Ned Goldreyer and Scott Adams
2	"The Virtual; Employee"	Co-written with Ned Goldreyer and Scott Adams
2	"Pregnancy"	Co-written with Scott Adams
2	"The Delivery"	Co-written with Scott Adams
2	"The Fact"	Co-written with Ron Nelson, Mark Steen, and Scott Adams
2	"Ethics"	Co-written with Scott Adams

=== Curb Your Enthusiasm ===
In 2000, Charles began his first directorial job on the HBO series Curb Your Enthusiasm, Larry David's follow-up to Seinfeld (which David co-created). Charles directed 18 episodes of the hit show.

		Episodes of Curb Your Enthusiasm directed by Larry Charles
Season	Episode	Notes
1	"The Wire"	
2	"Trick Or Treat"	
3	"The Benadryl Brownie"	
3	"The Nanny From Hell"	Charles was nominated in the 'Outstanding Directorial Achievement in Comedy Series' categories at both the Directors Guild of America and Emmy Award ceremonies for this episode.
4	"Mel's Offer"	
4	"The Blind Date"	
4	"The Surrogate"	
4	"The Survivor"	Charles received his second Emmy nomination in the category of 'Outstanding Directorial Achievement in Comedy Series' for this episode.
5	"The Bowtie"	
5	"The Ski Lift"	
5	"The End"	Charles received his second Directors Guild of America nomination for 'Outstanding Directorial Achievement in Comedy Series' for this episode.
6	"Meet the Blacks"	
6	"The Bat Mitzvah"	
7	"Funkhouser's Crazy Sister"	
7	"The Bare Midriff"	
8	"Mister Softee"	
9	"Thank You for Your Service"	
9	“The Accidental Text on Purpose“	

=== Entourage ===
Charles served as an executive producer and writer on the HBO show Entourage for the first two seasons. The episodes that he wrote were:

		Episodes of Entourage written by Larry Charles
Season	Episode	Info
1	"Talk Show"	
1	"Busey and the Beach"	co-written with Doug Ellin
1	"New York"	co-written with Doug Ellin
2	"Chinatown"	co-written with Brian Burns

== Personal life ==
Charles has been married at least twice, to Barbara DeSantis and Keely Charles.

Charles has a daughter, Pearl Charles, who is a singer-songwriter.

Charles objected to "blind support for this Israeli genocide" in reference to the Gaza war.
