= Stand-in =

Substitute for an actor for production purposes

A stand-in, sometimes a lighting double, for film and television is a person who substitutes for the actor before filming, for technical purposes such as lighting and camera setup. Stand-ins are helpful in the initial processes of film and television production.

Stand-ins allow the director of photography to light the set and the camera department to light and focus scenes while the actors are absent. The director will often ask stand-ins to deliver the scene dialogue ("lines") and walk through ("blocking") the scenes to be filmed.

Stand-ins are distinguished from doubles, who replace actors on camera from behind, in makeup, or during dangerous stunts. Stand-ins do not appear on camera. However, on some productions the jobs of stand-in and double may be done by the same person. In rare cases, a stand-in will appear on screen, sometimes as an in-joke. For instance, a scene in Heidi (1937) features the title character's grandfather (Jean Hersholt) mistake a stranger for Heidi (Shirley Temple); the look-alike was played by Temple's regular stand-in, Mary Lou Isleib. In another case, the actress who pretends to be Ann Darrow in the stage show during the final act of King Kong (2005) is played by Naomi Watts' stand-in, Julia Walshaw.

Stand-ins do not necessarily look like the actor, but they must have the same skin tone, hair color, height and build as the actor so that the lighting in a scene will be set up correctly. For example, if the lighting is set up with a stand-in shorter than an actor, the actor might end up having their head in relative darkness. In some cases, a star and stand-in do differ in height: Ann Sheridan's stand-in, Marveen Zehner, was taller than the actress and reportedly worked shoeless, and actor Tommy Noonan wore three-inch risers in his shoes to stand-in for Tyrone Power.

Some actors' contracts mandate that they will always have the same stand-in. Famous cases include Pluma Noisom (stand-in for Claudette Colbert), Harry Cornbleth (Fred Astaire) and Adam Bryant (Robin Williams). Myrna Loy wrote in her autobiography Myrna Loy: Being and Becoming about her friendship and working relationship with her stand-in, Shirley Hughes. When Bette Davis walked out on her Warner Bros. contract, she negotiated for her regular stand-in, Sally Sage, to continue to work at the studio.

== Stand-in use in animation ==
Stand-ins are also used for animated characters in live-action animated films, usually with life-size character models instead of people. This lets the animators know where to place the animated character in the scene, how to make them move realistically, and for actors to know where to look. In these cases, skin tone and hair color are not important. Height and build, however, are still important for any interaction between live-action actors and animated characters.

== See also ==
- Fake Shemp
- Understudy
- Doppelgänger
- Impersonation
- Look-alike
- Political decoy
- Simulacrum
- Stand-In (1937 film)
- "The Stand In" (Seinfeld episode)
