= Tom Cherones =

American television director and producer (1939–2026)

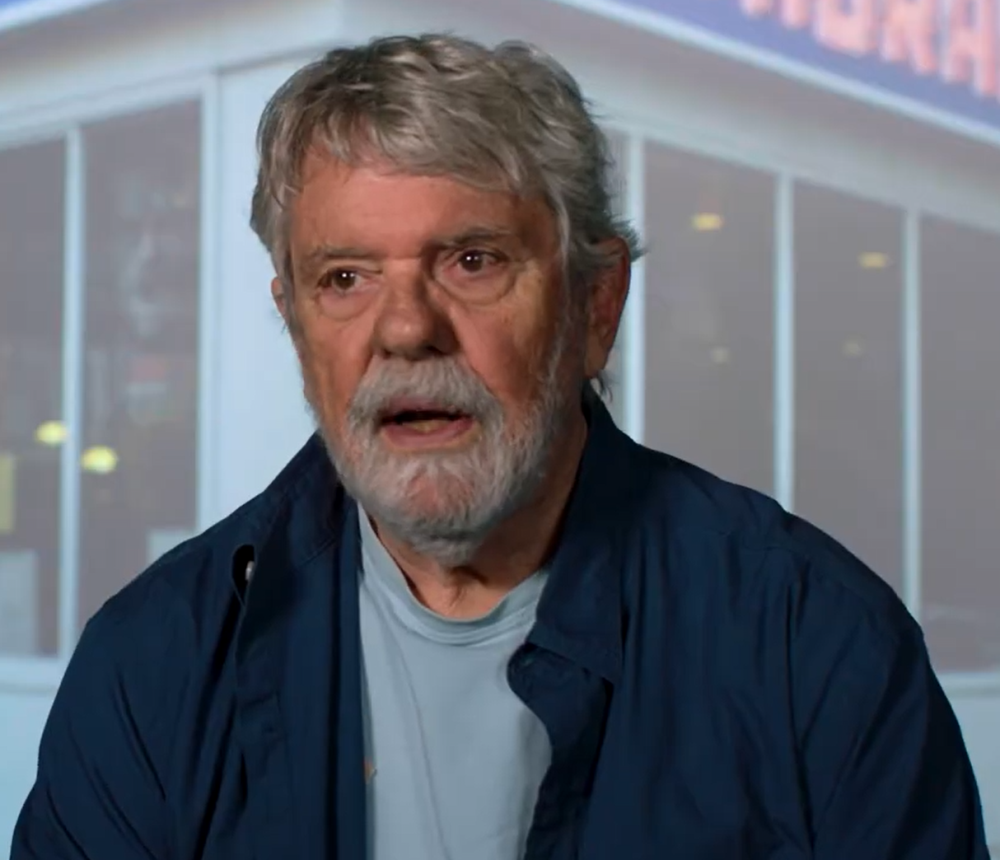
- Cherones in 2020
- Born: Thomas Harry Cherones Jr. September 11, 1939; Tuscaloosa, Alabama, U.S.
- Died: January 5, 2026 (aged 86); Florence, Oregon, U.S.
- Education: University of New Mexico (BA); University of Alabama (MA)
- Occupations: Television director; producer
- Spouses: Bobby; Joyce Keener (died 2006); Carol E. Richards
- Children: 2

Thomas Harry Cherones Jr. (/tʃʌˈroʊnɛs/ chə-ROH-ness; September 11, 1939 – January 5, 2026) was an American television director and producer. He directed 81 of the 86 episodes of the first five seasons of Seinfeld. For his work directing the series, he won a Directors Guild of America Award, and a Primetime Emmy Award as producer.

== Early life and education ==
Cherones was born on September 11, 1939, in Tuscaloosa, Alabama, where he was also raised. His father, Tom Cherones Sr. operated a radio and television repair shop there. His grandfather was a Greek immigrant. His mother was Hazel Belle Hyche. He has a younger brother, Bill Cherones, who also worked in Hollywood.

Cherones graduated from the University of New Mexico in 1961 with a bachelor's degree in journalism and received a master's degree in telecommunications from the University of Alabama in 1966. From 1961 to 1965, he was a lieutenant in the United States Navy.

== Television career ==
Cherones began working in educational television while a student at the University of Alabama and later produced and directed programs for WQED in Pittsburgh. His first work after moving to Hollywood in 1975 was as a production manager for General Hospital and Welcome Back Kotter.

I had done a lot of work in various jobs before I got to Seinfeld, and they pretty much all looked the same. As a producer and director, I was in a position to make this one look different. Larry and Jerry asked me early on, “Can we do this? Can we do that?” I said, “We can do anything. You write it and I’ll shoot."

— Tom Cherones, interview with The Hollywood Reporter.

Cherones worked as a television producer and/or director on Growing Pains, My Sister Sam, and Annie McGuire in the 1980s. In the 1990s, he directed and produced Seinfeld (81 episodes) and NewsRadio (56 episodes). His work on Seinfeld won him praise as well as an Emmy, a DGA Award and a Golden Globe Award.

Several of Cherones's Seinfeld episodes are considered highlights of the series, including "The Chinese Restaurant," "The Parking Garage," and "The Contest," with the latter featured in rankings of the greatest television episodes of all time. Within Seinfeld, he appears in a cameo as the fictional director in "The Pilot." Cherones left Seinfeld after season five at Jerry Seinfeld's request: "He was tired of the same thing, I guess. We changed writers almost every season, and finally he just wanted somebody else, another presence, to try to keep it fresh," Cherones said. He was succeeded as lead director by Andy Ackerman. Cherones also directed episodes of other shows including Caroline in the City, Ellen, Sabrina the Teenage Witch, and Desperate Housewives.

In 2003, Cherones was inducted into the Alabama Stage and Screen Hall of Fame. He was also inducted into the University of Alabama College of Communication and Information Sciences Hall of Fame in 2001.

== Later life ==
From 2002 to 2014, Cherones taught a film production course at the University of Alabama in Tuscaloosa, where he had earned a master's degree. In 2012, Cherones published his first novel, The Hardly Boys, a parody of the old Hardy Boys books.

== Personal life and death ==
Cherones had two children with his first wife, Bobby. He moved to Hollywood in 1975 with his second wife, Joyce Keener, who died in 2006.

Cherones was married to his third wife, Carol, when he died from Alzheimer's disease at his home in Florence, Oregon, on January 5, 2026, at the age of 86.

== Filmography ==
Year	Title	Role	Additional Notes
1985–1986	Growing Pains	Supervising Producer	10 episodes
1986	My Sister Sam	Director	1 episode
1986	My Sister Sam	Supervising Producer	4 episodes
1988	Annie McGuire	Director	1 episode
1988	Annie McGuire	Supervising Producer	7 episodes
1988	Just in Time	Director	1 episode
1988	Just in Time	Supervising Producer	5 episodes
1988	Philby	Producer	TV Movie
1988	The Silence at Bethany	Producer	
1990–1994	Seinfeld	Director	80 episodes
1990–1994	Seinfeld	Supervising Producer/Producer	82 episodes
1994–1995	Ellen	Director	23 episodes
1995	Pins and Needles	Director	TV Movie
1995–1996	Caroline in the City	Director	9 episodes
1996	Men Behaving Badly	Director	1 episode
1996	The Faculty	Director	3 episodes
1996	Boston Common	Director	1 episode
1996–1999	NewsRadio	Director	57 episodes
1999	Oh, Grow Up	Director	4 episodes
1999	Ladies Man	Director	1 episode
1999	Sabrina the Teenage Witch	Director	1 episode
2003	The Pitts	Director	1 episode
2006	Desperate Housewives	Director	1 episode
2009	Reaper	Director	1 episode
