= List of awards and nominations received by Jerry Seinfeld =

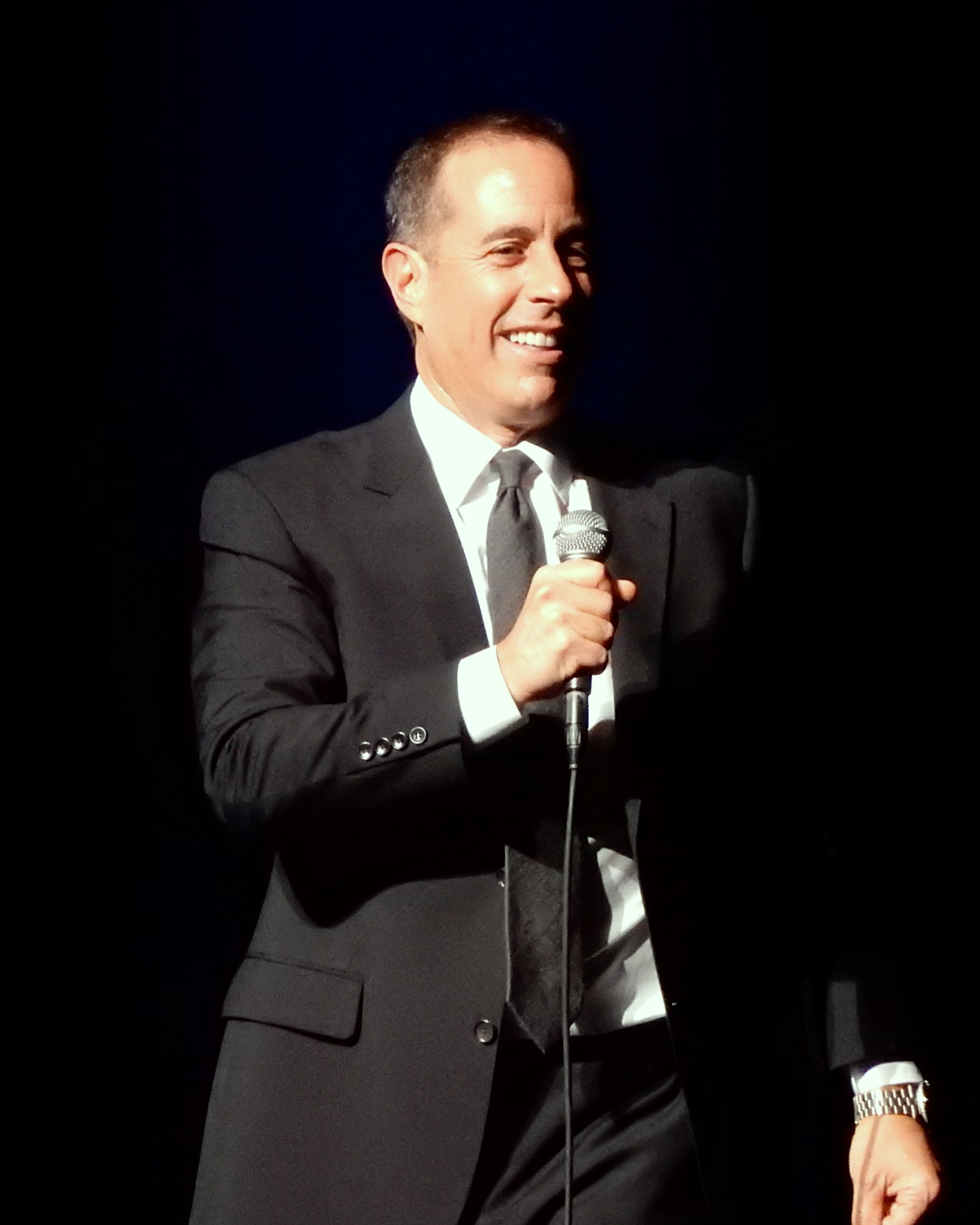
Seinfeld performing standup comedy in 2016

This article is a List of awards and nominations received by Jerry Seinfeld.

Jerry Seinfeld is an American comedian, actor, director, producer, and writer. Seinfeld has received numerous accolades over his career including a Primetime Emmy Award, a Golden Globe Award, three Screen Actors Guild Awards, as well as nominations for three Grammy Awards.

He is known for his work in standup comedy, television, and film. He created the critically and commercially acclaimed NBC sitcom Seinfeld from 1989 to 1998 which earned him the Primetime Emmy Award for Outstanding Comedy Series in 1994. He created the streaming talk show series Comedians in Cars Getting Coffee (2012–present) which earned him three Webby Awards as well as nominations for five Primetime Emmy Awards.

For standup he received three nominations for the Grammy Award for Best Comedy Album for I'm Telling You for the Last Time (1999), Jerry Before Seinfeld (2018), and 23 Hours to Kill (2021) with the later receiving a nomination for the Primetime Emmy Award for Outstanding Variety Special (Pre-Recorded).

== Major associations ==
=== Emmy Awards ===
Primetime Emmy Awards
Year	Category	Nominated work	Result	Ref.
1991	Outstanding Writing for a Comedy Series	Seinfeld (episode: "The Pony Remark")	Nominated	
1992	Outstanding Comedy Series	Seinfeld (season 3)	Nominated	
1992	Outstanding Lead Actor in a Comedy Series	Seinfeld (episode: "The Boyfriend")	Nominated	
1993	Outstanding Comedy Series	Seinfeld (season 4)	Won	
1993	Outstanding Lead Actor in a Comedy Series	Seinfeld (episode: "The Opera")	Nominated	
1994	Outstanding Comedy Series	Seinfeld (season 5)	Nominated	
1994	Outstanding Lead Actor in a Comedy Series	Seinfeld (episode: "The Puffy Shirt")	Nominated	
1995	Outstanding Comedy Series	Seinfeld (season 6)	Nominated	
1995	Outstanding Lead Actor in a Comedy Series	Seinfeld (episode: "The Diplomat's Club")	Nominated	
1996	Outstanding Comedy Series	Seinfeld (season 7)	Nominated	
1996	Outstanding Lead Actor in a Comedy Series	Seinfeld (episode: "The Gum")	Nominated	
1997	Outstanding Comedy Series	Seinfeld (season 8)	Nominated	
1998	Outstanding Comedy Series	Seinfeld (season 9)	Nominated	
1999	Outstanding Variety, Music or Comedy Special	I'm Telling You for the Last Time	Nominated	
2013	Outstanding Short-Format Nonfiction Program	Comedians in Cars Getting Coffee	Nominated	
2014	Outstanding Short-Format Nonfiction Program	Comedians in Cars Getting Coffee	Nominated	
2016	Outstanding Variety Talk Series	Comedians in Cars Getting Coffee	Nominated	
2019	Outstanding Informational Series	Comedians in Cars Getting Coffee	Nominated	
2020	Outstanding Informational Series	Comedians in Cars Getting Coffee	Nominated	
2020	Outstanding Variety Special (Pre-Recorded)	23 Hours to Kill	Nominated	
2024	Outstanding Television Movie	Unfrosted	Nominated	

=== Golden Globe Awards ===
Year	Category	Nominated work	Result	Ref.
1994	Best Actor – Television Series Musical or Comedy	Seinfeld (season 5)	Won	
1995	Best Actor – Television Series Musical or Comedy	Seinfeld (season 6)	Nominated	
1996	Best Actor – Television Series Musical or Comedy	Seinfeld (season 7)	Nominated	
1998	Best Actor – Television Series Musical or Comedy	Seinfeld (season 9)	Nominated	

=== Grammy Awards ===
Year	Category	Nominated work	Result	Ref.
1999	Best Comedy Album	I'm Telling You for the Last Time	Nominated	
2003	Spoken Word Album for Children	Halloween	Nominated	
2018	Best Comedy Album	Jerry Before Seinfeld	Nominated	
2021	Best Comedy Album	23 Hours to Kill	Nominated	

=== Screen Actors Guild Award ===
Year	Category	Nominated work	Result	Ref.
1995	Ensemble in a Comedy Series	Seinfeld (season 6)	Won	
1996	Ensemble in a Comedy Series	Seinfeld (season 7)	Nominated	
1997	Ensemble in a Comedy Series	Seinfeld (season 8)	Won	
1998	Ensemble in a Comedy Series	Seinfeld (season 9)	Won	

== Miscellaneous awards ==
=== American Comedy Awards ===
Year	Category	Nominated work	Result	Ref.
1988	Comedy Club Standup Comic - Male	Jerry Seinfeld	Won	
1992	Funniest Male Performer in a TV Series	Seinfeld	Won	
1993	Funniest Male Performer in a TV Series	Seinfeld	Won	
1996	Funniest Male Performer in a TV Series	Seinfeld	Nominated	
1999	Funniest Male Performer in a TV Series	I'm Telling You for the Last Time	Nominated	

=== Golden Raspberry Awards ===
Year	Category	Nominated work	Result	Ref.
2024	Worst Director	Unfrosted	Nominated	
2024	Worst Actor	Unfrosted	Won	
2024	Worst Screen Combo (Nominated as "Any two unfunny "comedic" actors")	Unfrosted	Nominated	

=== Kids Choice Awards ===
Year	Category	Nominated work	Result	Ref.
2008	Favorite Voice from an Animated Movie	Bee Movie	Nominated	

=== People's Choice Awards ===
Year	Category	Nominated work	Result	Ref.
1994	Favorite Male TV Performer	Jerry Seinfeld	Nominated	
1995	Favorite Male TV Performer	Jerry Seinfeld	Nominated	
1997	Favorite Male TV Performer	Jerry Seinfeld	Nominated	

=== Producers Guild of America Awards ===
Year	Category	Nominated work	Result	Ref.
1993	Most Promising Producer in Television	Seinfeld	Nominated	
2007	Best Animated Motion Picture	Bee Movie	Nominated	

=== Television Critics Association ===
Year	Category	Nominated work	Result	Ref.
1998	Individual Achievement in Comedy	Seinfeld	Nominated	
1998	Career Achievement Award		Honored	

=== Viewers for Quality Television Awards ===
Year	Category	Nominated work	Result	Ref.
1992	Best Actor in a Quality Comedy Series	Seinfeld	Nominated	
1993	Best Actor in a Quality Comedy Series	Seinfeld	Won	
1994	Best Actor in a Quality Comedy Series	Seinfeld	Nominated	
1995	Best Actor in a Quality Comedy Series	Seinfeld	Nominated	
1996	Best Actor in a Quality Comedy Series	Seinfeld	Nominated	
1997	Best Actor in a Quality Comedy Series	Seinfeld	Nominated	

=== The Webby Awards ===
Year	Category	Nominated work	Result	Ref.
2013	Outstanding Comedic Performance	Comedians in Cars Getting Coffee	Won	
2013	Video - Best Individual Performance	Comedians in Cars Getting Coffee	Nominated	
2016	Video - Best Web Personality/Host	Comedians in Cars Getting Coffee	Won	
2016	Video - Comedy: Longform	Comedians in Cars Getting Coffee	Won	

=== Writers Guild of America Awards ===
Year	Category	Nominated work	Result	Ref.
1990	Episodic Comedy	Seinfeld (episode: "The Stake Out")	Nominated	
1992	Episodic Comedy	Seinfeld (episode: "The Stranded")	Nominated	

== Honorary awards ==
- Honorary Doctorate of Humane Letters – Queens College (1994)
- Honorary Doctor of Arts – Duke University (2024)
