= George Shapiro =

American talent agent and television producer (1931–2022)

- Born: May 18, 1931; The Bronx, New York, U.S.
- Died: May 26, 2022 (aged 91); Beverly Hills, California, U.S.
- Education: DeWitt Clinton High School; New York University
- Occupation: Talent agent
- Spouse: Diane Barnett (m. 1983)

George Shapiro (May 18, 1931 – May 26, 2022) was an American talent manager and television producer. He was among the most successful managers in show business in the United States, best known for representing Jerry Seinfeld, Carl Reiner, and Andy Kaufman and serving as a producer for the sitcom Seinfeld.

== Early life and education ==
Shapiro was born in the Bronx on May 18, 1931, to Sylvia (née Lebost) and Ira Shapiro. His father worked as a furrier and his mother was a social activist. He first met his future business partner, Howard West, in the third grade. When Shapiro was 12, Carl Reiner married Shapiro's aunt, Estelle Lebost, and became his uncle. He attended P.S. 80, DeWitt Clinton High School, before studying at New York University (NYU).

== Career ==
After completing his postgraduate studies at NYU in 1953, he served in the United States Army for two years. He then worked in the mailroom at the William Morris Agency in New York. He advanced within the company and soon became an agent. One of his first assignments was to accompany Elvis Presley during his appearances on The Ed Sullivan Show. Eventually, he began packaging programs, including the hits The Steve Allen Show, That Girl starring Marlo Thomas, and Gomer Pyle starring Jim Nabors. He also packaged a number of specials for Dick Van Dyke, Mary Tyler Moore and Carol Channing.

Shapiro left William Morris to become a personal manager and producer along with his partner and friend, Howard West. They formed Shapiro/West Productions and executive produced the Emmy-, Peabody-, and Golden Globe award-winning series Seinfeld. Shapiro was Andy Kaufman's personal manager for many years, executive producing his Showtime special Andy Kaufman at Carnegie Hall and The Andy Kaufman Show on ABC. He was executive producer with West on the Universal biopic Man on the Moon (1999), starring Jim Carrey in the role of Andy Kaufman and Danny DeVito as Shapiro, and had a cameo in the movie as Mr. Besserman. He played a prominent role in the documentary Comedian featuring Seinfeld.

On June 30, 2012, people from the world of comedy gathered at the Beverly Wilshire Hotel in Beverly Hills to honor Shapiro. The David Lynch Foundation presented him with the first Lifetime of Bliss Award. He said he had been practicing Transcendental Meditation for 28 years.

== Personal life ==
Shapiro was married to Diane Barnett who died of breast cancer in 2005.

Shapiro was married to Melody Sherr prior to his marriage to Diane. Together, they had three children: Danny, Carrie, and Stefanie.

Shapiro died of natural causes on May 26, 2022, at his home in Beverly Hills, aged 91.

== Filmography ==
=== As a producer ===
| Year | Title | Notes |
|---|---|---|
| 1977 | The Last Remake of Beau Geste | |
| 1979 | Andy's Funhouse | TV special Documentary |
| 1980 | Andy Kaufman plays Carnegie Hall | Comedy Special |
| 1980 | In God We Tru$t | |
| 1981 | Lewis & Clark | |
| 1985 | Summer Rental | |
| 1987 | Summer School | |
| 1987 | Stand-Up Confidential | Standup Special |
| 1987 | Elayne Boosler: Broadway Baby | Standup Special |
| 1989 | Bert Rigby, You're a Fool | |
| 1990 | Sibling Rivalry | |
| 1995 | A Comedy Salute to Andy Kaufman | Television Special |
| 1989-98 | Seinfeld | 173 episodes |
| 1999 | Man on the Moon | |
| 2003 | The Bronx Boys | Documentary |
| 2004 | The Seinfeld Story | Documentary |
| 2011 | Colin Quinn: Long Story Short | Comedy Special |
| 2010-11 | The Marriage Ref | 22 episodes |
| 2013 | The Bronx Boys Still Playing at 80 | Documentary |
| 2016-17 | The Dick Van Dyke Show: Now in Living Color! | Television Special |
| 2017 | If You're Not in the Obit, Eat Breakfast | Documentary, HBO |
| 2017 | Jerry Before Seinfeld | Comedy Special, Netflix; final film role |

=== As an actor ===
| Year | Title | Role | Notes |
|---|---|---|---|
| 1999 | Man on the Moon | Mr. Besserman | |
| 2002 | Comedian | Himself | Documentary |
| 2016 | Dying Laughing | Himself | Documentary |
| 2017 | If You're Not in the Obit, Eat Breakfast | Himself | Documentary, HBO |
| 2017 | Jim & Andy: The Great Beyond | Himself | Documentary, Netflix |
| 2019 | The Bronx, USA | Himself | Documentary |

== Awards and nominations ==
Primetime Emmy Awards

| Year | Category | Project | Result | Ref. |
|---|---|---|---|---|
| 1992 | Outstanding Comedy Series | Seinfeld | Nominated | |
| 1993 | Outstanding Comedy Series | Seinfeld | Won | |
| 1994 | Outstanding Comedy Series | Seinfeld | Nominated | |
| 1995 | Outstanding Comedy Series | Seinfeld | Nominated | |
| 1995 | Outstanding Variety, Music or Comedy Special | A Comedy Salute to Andy Kaufman | Nominated | |
| 1996 | Outstanding Comedy Series | Seinfeld | Nominated | |
| 1997 | Outstanding Comedy Series | Seinfeld | Nominated | |
| 1998 | Outstanding Comedy Series | Seinfeld | Nominated | |
| 2016 | Outstanding Variety Talk Series | Comedians in Cars Getting Coffee | Nominated | |
| 2019 | Outstanding Informational Series | Comedians in Cars Getting Coffee | Nominated | |
