= Comedians in Cars Getting Coffee =

American Netflix series starring Jerry Seinfeld

- Genre: Talk show; Comedy
- Created by: Jerry Seinfeld
- Directed by: Jerry Seinfeld
- Presented by: Jerry Seinfeld
- Country of origin: United States
- Original language: English
- No. of seasons: 11
- No. of episodes: 84

Production
- Executive producer: Jerry Seinfeld
- Running time: 6–23 minutes
- Production companies: Sony Pictures Television; Embassy Row; Columbus 81 Productions

Original release
- Network: Crackle
- Release: July 19, 2012 – February 9, 2017
- Network: Netflix
- Release: July 6, 2018 – July 19, 2019

Related
- Seinfeld

Comedians in Cars Getting Coffee is an American television talk show directed and hosted by comedian Jerry Seinfeld. The series premiered on digital network Crackle on July 19, 2012, and has since run on Netflix. As of May 2015, it had been streamed nearly 100 million times. The series moved to Netflix in 2018 for the debut of its tenth season. Its eleventh season premiered on July 19, 2019. Seinfeld has since indicated that he may be done working on the series.

Episodes feature Seinfeld introducing a vintage car selected for a guest comedian, followed by a drive to a café or restaurant where they drink coffee and often eat a meal. Episodes diverge from the format spontaneously, from making unplanned stops to interacting with members of the public.

== Production ==
=== History ===
Seinfeld said that the roots of the concept traced to a DVD extra he made for his 2002 documentary Comedian along with a later trip he made after purchasing an old VW Beetle in New Mexico, subsequently filming the return trip to the east coast with a friend. Later, describing the birth of the series, Seinfeld said the series birth was "an experiment"—as "kind of a guess".

Before the series was developed, Seinfeld was told by leading social network advisers including those at Facebook and Yahoo, that a show length exceeding five minutes had little chance of success on the web. Howard Schultz, coffee magnate and chairman of Starbucks, turned down the opportunity to sponsor the show. Acura eventually sponsored the show, giving Seinfeld creative license with creating commercials and product placements.

The series premiered on Crackle on July 19, 2012. As of May 2015, it had been streamed nearly 100 million times. In January 2017, it was announced that the series would migrate to Netflix starting with the show's tenth season. The first nine seasons became available to stream on Netflix in January 2018. Excluded are the Super Bowl promotional episode with Jason Alexander and Wayne Knight reprising their respective roles of George Costanza and Newman from Seinfeld, a series of promotional videos featuring Michael Richards as fictional Crackle president Dick Corcoran and a spin-off series Single Shot (2014–2016), which compiled footage from various episodes to focus on a more narrow subject.

The series' eleventh season premiered on July 19, 2019. After hinting in mid-2020 that he may be done working on the series, Seinfeld said in late 2021, "I think I'm going to put that volume on the shelf." He elaborated that "It was a lot of fun and I got to meet ... a lot of those people who I had not met. We're friends now." The first episode filmed and last episode released feature Barry Marder and the same 1966 Porsche 356.

=== Format ===
Episodes are estimated to cost about $100,000, with guests being paid in cash and the initial raw shoot lasting on average three and a half hours, which is then edited over a two-week period down to a 12- to 20-minute episode. The process uses a lean production staff, involves a minimum of network interaction and is designed as an edited and unscripted talk show without an audience that can be comfortably watched on a smartphone.

The show is formatted around the car drive and "movement," as Seinfeld believed that "when attempting to show the meandering, silly and sometimes deep conversations that comedians share, you have to remove the audience to keep the participants from dropping into their acts," adding that "part of what makes the show watchable is that it's always moving. There's no narrative [to] drive the story. We know what happens. We know they're going to get coffee. You need a kinetic energy to move it along. Moving people around keeps them awake."

The format is similar to Robert Llewellyn's Carpool, which ran for over 100 episodes between 2009 and 2011. In July 2019, Seinfeld apologized to Llewellyn for the similarity and for not previously being aware of his series.

Bob Einstein became the first repeat guest on the show, appearing in the first season and again in the ninth season. Two guests have had their appearances split into two episodes: Jimmy Fallon in the fifth season and Ricky Gervais in the eleventh season. Several episodes have featured multiple guests appearing together including Carl Reiner and Mel Brooks; Colin Quinn and Mario Joyner; and Kathleen Madigan and Chuck Martin. Colleen Ballinger appeared in character as Miranda Sings as a guest on an episode.

== Episodes ==
=== Series overview ===
Season	Episodes	Originally released		
Season	Episodes	First released	Last released	Network
1	10	July 19, 2012	September 27, 2012	Crackle
2	6	June 13, 2013	July 18, 2013	Crackle
3	7	January 2, 2014	February 6, 2014	Crackle
4	5	June 19, 2014	July 17, 2014	Crackle
5	8	November 6, 2014	December 18, 2014	Crackle
6	6	June 3, 2015	July 8, 2015	Crackle
7	6	December 30, 2015	February 3, 2016	Crackle
8	6	June 16, 2016	July 21, 2016	Crackle
9	6	January 5, 2017	February 9, 2017	Crackle
10	12	July 6, 2018		Netflix
11	12	July 19, 2019		Netflix

=== Season 1 (2012) ===
No. overall	No. in season	Title	Guests	Car models	Restaurants	Release date	No. Netflix
1	1	"Larry Eats a Pancake"	Larry David	1952 Volkswagen Beetle	John O'Groats, Los Angeles, CA	July 19, 2012	C4.6
2	2	"Mad Man in a Death Machine"	Ricky Gervais	1967 Austin-Healey 3000	City Island Diner, City Island, Bronx, NY	August 2, 2012	C1.14
3	3	"A Monkey and a Lava Lamp"	Brian Regan	1970 Dodge Challenger T/A	Rae's Diner, Santa Monica, CA	August 9, 2012	C3.13
4	4	"Just a Lazy Shiftless Bastard"	Alec Baldwin	1970 Mercedes-Benz W113	Fairway Market Café, New York, NY	August 16, 2012	C1.4
5	5	"A Taste of Hell From on High"	Joel Hodgson	1963 Volkswagen Karmann Ghia	Skylark Diner, Edison, NJ	August 23, 2012	C1.19
Joel previously worked with Jerry on the 1987 special Stand-Up Confidential before making the cult TV series Mystery Science Theater 3000 the following year.
6	6	"Unusable on the Internet"	Bob Einstein	1970 Mercedes-Benz 300 SEL 6.3	Jerry's Deli, Studio City, Los Angeles, CA; Nate 'n Al's, Beverly Hills, CA	August 30, 2012	C4.10
7	7	"You Don't Want to Offend a Cannibal"	Barry Marder	1966 Porsche 356	Bendix Diner, Hasbrouck Heights, NJ	September 6, 2012	C3.16
8	8	"I Hear Downton Abbey Is Pretty Good..."	Colin Quinn & Mario Joyner	1976 Triumph TR6	Fort Defiance Café, Brooklyn, NY	September 13, 2012	C4.9
9	9	"I Want Sandwiches, I Want Chicken"	Carl Reiner & Mel Brooks	1960 Rolls-Royce Silver Cloud II; 1970 Porsche 911 (classic)	Norm's Diner, Los Angeles, CA; Nate 'n Al's, Beverly Hills, CA	September 20, 2012	C2.5
10	10	"It's Bubbly Time, Jerry"	Michael Richards & Barry Katz	1962 Volkswagen Type 2	The Malibu Kitchen, Malibu, CA	September 27, 2012	C1.17

=== Season 2 (2013) ===
No. overall	No. in season	Title	Guests	Car models	Restaurants	Release date	No. Netflix
11	1	"I'm Going to Change Your Life Forever"	Sarah Silverman	1969 Jaguar E-Type Series 2	Millie's, Silver Lake, Los Angeles, CA	June 13, 2013	C4.2
12	2	"I Like Kettlecorn"	David Letterman	1995 Volvo 960 station wagon	Green Granary, New Milford, CT	June 20, 2013	C2.9
13	3	"No Lipsticks for Nuns"	Gad Elmaleh	1950 Citroën 2CV	Pommes Frites, French Roast, New York, NY	June 27, 2013	C4.4
14	4	"You'll Never Play the Copa"	Don Rickles	1958 Cadillac Eldorado	Factor's Famous Deli, Los Angeles, CA	July 4, 2013	C2.7
15	5	"Really?!"	Seth Meyers	1973 Porsche 911 Carrera RS	Roebling Tea Room, Brooklyn, NY	July 11, 2013	C1.15
16	6	"Kids Need Bullying"	Chris Rock	1969 Lamborghini Miura P400S	Allendale Eats!, Allendale, NJ	July 18, 2013	C1.10

=== Season 3 (2014) ===
No. overall	No. in season	Title	Guests	Car models	Restaurants	Release date	No. Netflix
17	1	"Comedy, Sex and the Blue Numbers"	Louis C.K.	1959 Fiat 600 Jolly	Louis C.K.'s personal boat, New York, NY	January 2, 2014	C4.11
The episode was not initially included when the series debuted on Netflix on January 5, 2018. It was added on January 10, 2018.
18	2	"How Would You Kill Superman?"	Patton Oswalt	1981 DMC DeLorean	Handsome Coffee Roasters, Los Angeles, CA	January 9, 2014	C3.5
The DeLorean broke down.
19	3	"Comedy Is a Concealed Weapon"	Jay Leno	1949 Porsche 356	Jones Coffee, Pasadena, CA	January 16, 2014	C3.6
20	4	"So You're Mellow and Tense?"	Todd Barry	1966 MG MGB	Nathan's Famous, New York, NY	January 23, 2014	C3.15
21	5	"Feces Are My Purview"	Tina Fey	1967 Volvo 1800S	Floridita, Harlem, New York, NY; Dominique Ansel Bakery, SoHo, New York, NY	January 30, 2014	C1.12
22	6	"The Over-Cheer"	Jason Alexander as George Costanza; Wayne Knight as Newman	1976 AMC Pacer	Tom's Restaurant, New York, NY	February 2, 2014	TBA
Jerry and George Costanza (Jason Alexander, reprising his role from Seinfeld) have coffee and chat about proper etiquette for attending a Super Bowl party before running into Newman (Wayne Knight). The episode was written by Seinfeld and Larry David and was directed by David. A 90-second version of the episode aired on Fox before its Super Bowl XLVIII halftime coverage. This episode was excluded from the Netflix collections in 2018.
23	7	"The Last Days of Howard Stern"	Howard Stern	1969 Pontiac GTO	Bel Aire Diner, Astoria, Queens, NY	February 6, 2014	C2.4

=== Season 4 (2014) ===
No. overall	No. in season	Title	Guests	Car models	Restaurants	Release date	No. Netflix
24	1	"A Little Hyper-Aware"	Sarah Jessica Parker	1976 Ford Country Squire	Colony Diner, East Meadow, NY; Francesco's Bakery, Hicksville, NY	June 19, 2014	C1.6
25	2	"Two Polish Airline Pilots"	George Wallace	1965 Buick Riviera	Flamingo Las Vegas & Peppermill Fireside Lounge, Las Vegas, NV	June 26, 2014	C4.13
26	3	"Opera Pimp"	Robert Klein	1967 Jaguar Mark 2	Klein's home & Landmark Diner, Ossining, NY	July 3, 2014	C3.14
27	4	"It's Like Pushing a Building Off a Cliff"	Aziz Ansari	2012 Prevost Car X3-45 VIP	Brody's Diner, Shrewsbury, Massachusetts	July 10, 2014	C1.13
28	5	"The Sound of Virginity"	Jon Stewart	1978 AMC Gremlin; 1968 AMC AMX	Tick Tock Diner, Clifton, NJ	July 17, 2014	C3.4

=== Season 5 (2014) ===
A series of bonus promotional videos featuring Michael Richards as Crackle president Dick Corcoran were released before and during this season. Joan Rivers had been asked by Seinfeld to be the fifth season's first guest. However, she postponed her appearance due to a scheduled medical procedure. Rivers died as a result of that procedure.

No. overall	No. in season	Title	Guests	Car models	Restaurants	Release date	No. Netflix
29	1	"You Look Amazing in the Wind"	Kevin Hart	1959 Porsche 718	212 Pier, Santa Monica, CA	November 6, 2014	C2.2
30	2	"I'm Wondering What It's Like to Date Me"	Amy Schumer	1971 Ferrari Daytona 365 GTB/4	Short Stop Diner, Bronx, NY	November 13, 2014	C3.1
31	3	"Smoking Past the Band"	Bill Burr	1970 Boss 302 Mustang	Novel Cafe, Santa Monica, California	November 20, 2014	C4.3
32	4	"Happy Thanksgiving Miranda"	Miranda Sings	1960 Austin-Healey Sprite	Art's Delicatessen Restaurant, Studio City, Los Angeles, CA	November 27, 2014	C4.5
33	5	"I Wasn't Told About This... with Special Feature: I'm Dying, Jerry"	Fred Armisen	1965 Saab 96 Monte Carlo 850	Coava Coffee Roasters, Portland, OR	December 4, 2014	C3.8
34	6	"I'm Going to Take a Percocet and Let That One Go"	Ali Wentworth	1970 Mercedes-Benz W111	Fiddler's Elbow Country Club, Bedminster, NJ	December 11, 2014	C1.20
35–36	7–8	"The Unsinkable Legend — Part 1 & Part 2"	Jimmy Fallon	1956 Chevrolet Corvette (C1); 1994 Land Rover Defender 90	John's Pancake House, Montauk, NY	December 18, 2014	C1.2/C1.3
Released in two parts on both Crackle and Netflix.

=== Season 6 (2015) ===
No. overall	No. in season	Title	Guests	Car models	Restaurants	Release date	No. Netflix
37	1	"I'll Go If I Don't Have to Talk"	Julia Louis-Dreyfus	1964 Aston Martin DB5	Caffe Luxxe & Art's Table, Santa Monica, CA	June 3, 2015	C2.6
38	2	"Always Do the Banana Joke First"	Steve Harvey	1957 Chevrolet Bel Air	Manny's Cafeteria & Biggs Mansion, Chicago, IL	June 10, 2015	C3.2
39	3	"We Love Breathing What You're Burning, Baby"	Jim Carrey	1976 Lamborghini Countach	Killer Cafe, Marina del Rey, CA	June 17, 2015	C1.1
40	4	"The Comedy Team of Smug and Arrogant"	Bill Maher	1979 Volkswagen Beetle	Brite Spot, Echo Park, Los Angeles, CA	June 24, 2015	C4.1
41	5	"That's the Whole Point of Apartheid, Jerry"	Trevor Noah	1985 Ferrari 308 GTBi	One Girl Cookies, Brooklyn, NY	July 1, 2015	C1.7
42	6	"Cut Up and Bloody but Looking Good"	Stephen Colbert	1964 Morgan +4	Bluestone Coffee Co., Montclair, NJ	July 8, 2015	C1.5

=== Season 7 (2015–16) ===
No. overall	No. in season	Title	Guests	Car models	Restaurants	Release date	No. Netflix
43	1	"Just Tell Him You're the President"	Barack Obama	1963 Corvette Sting Ray	Staff dining room of the White House, Washington, D.C.	December 30, 2015	C2.1
44	2	"If You See This on a Toilet Seat, Don't Sit Down"	Steve Martin	1954 Siata 8V; 1966 Ford Mustang	Pleasantville Diner, Pleasantville, NY	January 6, 2016	C3.3
45	3	"Stroked Out on a Hot Machine"	Kathleen Madigan & Chuck Martin	1972 BMW 2002 tii	Alfred Coffee, Studio City, Los Angeles, CA	January 13, 2016	C4.12
46	4	"It's Great That Garry Shandling Is Still Alive"	Garry Shandling	1979 Porsche 930 Turbo	Du-Par's Restaurant & Bakery, Studio City, Los Angeles, CA	January 20, 2016	C3.9
47	5	"I Don't Think That's Bestiality"	Sebastian Maniscalco	1969 Chevrolet Camaro Z28	Intelligentsia Coffee & The Tasting Kitchen, Venice, Los Angeles, CA	January 27, 2016	C4.7
48	6	"Mr. Ferrell, For the Last Time, We're Going to Ask You to Put the Cigar Out"	Will Ferrell	1970 Plymouth Superbird	Med Cafe, Marina del Rey, CA	February 3, 2016	C2.3

=== Season 8 (2016) ===
No. overall	No. in season	Title	Guests	Car models	Restaurants	Release date	No. Netflix
49	1	"Stick Around for the Pope"	Jim Gaffigan	1977 Volkswagen Westfalia Camper	Second Avenue Deli, Manhattan, NY	June 16, 2016	C3.7
50	2	"You Can Go Cho Again"	Margaret Cho	1967 Mazda Cosmo	Highland Cafe, Los Angeles, CA	June 23, 2016	C3.11
51	3	"Escape from Syosset"	Judd Apatow	1968 Pontiac Firebird 400	101 Coffee Shop, Los Angeles, CA	June 30, 2016	C2.8
52	4	"Everybody Respects a Bloody Nose"	J. B. Smoove	1964 Studebaker Avanti	10 Speed Coffee, Calabasas, CA	July 7, 2016	C1.18
53	5	"Everybody Likes to See the Monkeys"	Lorne Michaels	1955 Mercedes-Benz 300 SL Gullwing	The Monkey Bar, New York, NY	July 14, 2016	C3.12
54	6	"What Kind of Human Animal Would Do This?"	John Oliver	1959 Triumph TR3	Allswell, Brooklyn, NY	July 21, 2016	C1.9

=== Season 9 (2017) ===
No. overall	No. in season	Title	Guests	Car models	Restaurants	Release date	No. Netflix
55	1	"The Volvo-ness"	Kristen Wiig	1964 Volvo 122S Amazon	House of Pies, Los Angeles, CA	January 5, 2017	C1.8
56	2	"A Rusty Car in the Rain"	Norm Macdonald	1958 Porsche 356A	Jackson Hole Diner, East Elmhurst, Queens, NY	January 12, 2017	C1.16
57	3	"Dictators, Comics, and Preachers"	Cedric the Entertainer	1958 Bentley S1	The Butcher's Daughter, New York, NY	January 19, 2017	C3.10
58	4	"At What Point Am I Out from Under?"	Lewis Black	1967 Cadillac Eldorado	Junior's, Downtown Brooklyn, NY	January 26, 2017	C4.8
59	5	"Champagne, Cigars, and Pancake Batter"	Christoph Waltz	1957 BMW 507 Series II	IHOP, Torrance, CA	February 2, 2017	C1.11
60	6	"It's Not So Funny When It's Your Mother"	Bob Einstein	2017 Acura NSX	Urth Caffé, Los Angeles, CA	February 9, 2017	C4.14

=== Season 10 (2018) ===
No. overall	No. in season	Title	Guests	Car models	Restaurants	Release date	No. Netflix
61	1	"From The Third Reich To You"	Zach Galifianakis	1972 Volkswagen Thing	Royal Donuts & Dinah's Family Restaurant, Los Angeles, CA	July 6, 2018	C5.E1
62	2	"Nobody Says, "I Wish I Had A Camera""	Dave Chappelle	1973 Citroën SM	The Diner, Washington, D.C.	July 6, 2018	C5.E2
63	3	"You Said It Wasn't Funny"	Ellen DeGeneres	1977 Toyota Land Cruiser (J40)	Tre Lune, Montecito, CA	July 6, 2018	C5.E3
64	4	"Lasagna With Six Different Cheeses"	Tracy Morgan	1984 Ferrari 288 GTO	Raymond's Restaurant, Ridgewood, NJ	July 6, 2018	C5.E4
65	5	"Are There Left Handed Spoons?"	Brian Regan	2005 Cadillac XLR	Espresso Profeta, Los Angeles, CA	July 6, 2018	C5.E5
66	6	"Na.. Ga.. Do.. It"	Dana Carvey	Meyers Manx Dune Buggy	The Beverly Hills Hotel, Beverly Hills, CA	July 6, 2018	C5.E6
67	7	"Nobody Cries At A Joke"	Hasan Minhaj	1992 Ferrari 512TR	Hastings Center Restaurant, Hastings-on-Hudson, NY	July 6, 2018	C5.E7
68	8	"Red Bottom Shoes Equals Fantastic Babies"	Neal Brennan	1965 Porsche 356 C	The Good Stuff, Hermosa Beach, CA	July 6, 2018	C5.E8
69	9	"A Hooker In The Rain"	John Mulaney	1969 Alfa Romeo Giulia Super	Capizzi, New York, NY	July 6, 2018	C5.E9
70	10	"A Brain In A Jar"	Kate McKinnon	1962 Fiat 600 Multipla	Via Quadronno, New York, NY	July 6, 2018	C5.E10
71	11	"Gyrating, Naked Twister"	Alec Baldwin	1974 BMW 3.0 CS coupe	Madman Espresso, New York, NY; Massapequa Diner, Massapequa, NY	July 6, 2018	C5.E11
72	12	"Heere's Jerry!"	Jerry Lewis	1966 Jaguar E-Type	The Omelet House, Las Vegas, NV	July 6, 2018	C5.E12

=== Season 11 (2019) ===
No. overall	No. in season	Title	Guests	Car models	Restaurants	Release date	No. Netflix
73	1	"I Just Wanted to Kill"	Eddie Murphy	2004 Porsche Carrera GT	The Rose Venice, Venice, Los Angeles, CA	July 19, 2019	C6.E1
74	2	"We Have the Meats"	Seth Rogen	1976 Dodge Royal Monaco Sedan	Canter's Deli and Arby's, Los Angeles, CA	July 19, 2019	C6.E2
75–76	3–4	"China Maybe? – Parts 1 & 2"	Ricky Gervais	2018 Rolls-Royce Dawn	City Limits Diner, White Plains, NY; Martine's Fine Bake Shoppe, Scarsdale, NY	July 19, 2019	C6.E3/C6.E4
77	5	"These People That Do This Stuff. They Stink."	Matthew Broderick	2018 Lamborghini Huracán Performante	Joe Coffee and Le Pain Quotidien, New York, NY	July 19, 2019	C6.E5
78	6	"You Got to Get The Alligator Sweat"	Jamie Foxx	1969 Maserati Mistral	Slim Goodies Diner, New Orleans, LA	July 19, 2019	C6.E6
79	7	"My Wife Didn't Know the Extent of It"	Sebastian Maniscalco	1959 Lambretta Series II	Pasticceria Rocco, Faicco's Italian Specialties, Grom Gelato, and Murray's Cheese Shop, New York, NY	July 19, 2019	C6.E7
80	8	"A Dream World of Residuals"	Martin Short	1983 Mercedes-Benz 300D Wagon	Lunetta, Santa Monica, CA	July 19, 2019	C6.E8
81	9	"He Should Have Been Done That"	Mario Joyner	1974 VW Thing	Roscoe's House of Chicken and Waffles and Pinkberry, Los Angeles, CA	July 19, 2019	C6.E9
82	10	"Melissa Villaseñor"	Melissa Villaseñor	1991 Nissan Figaro	Forrest Point, Brooklyn, NY	July 19, 2019	C6.E10
83	11	"Still Hot To The Touch"	Bridget Everett	1961 Cadillac Series 62 Convertible	Café Angelique, Tenafly, NJ	July 19, 2019	C6.E11
84	12	"Big Lots and BevMo!"	Barry Marder	1966 Porsche 356 SC Cabriolet	Brent's Deli, Northridge, CA	July 19, 2019	C6.E12

== Reception ==
Brian Lowry of Variety said that the series is the kind of short-form concept that feels stretched, even at 18 minutes. David Hinckley of The New York Daily News gave the series 3 out of 5 stars. Mike Hale of The New York Times said: "The [series' segments] ... are presented in a clean, elegant template with a studiously casual pencil-drawn logo. And the filming and editing are, if you break them down, impressively complex and artful for a Web series."

The New York Times's Anand Giridharadas critiqued the show as being out of touch with the everyman and more of a showcase of Seinfeld's wealth. "We watch pairs of rich guys chatting about the gilded joys of their lives and careers and cars, about the sealed-off world they inhabit and we don't." Giridharadas wrote. "…The democracy of observational humor has become, in Mr. Seinfeld's reincarnation, an oligarchy of mutual admiration." Other publications have been more positive in their opinion. The New York Daily News wrote of the show's format and first three seasons that, "It all sounds random, which it is and trivial, which it is and isn't. In the end, the fun is contagious." Newsday then graded season four of the series with an "A".

Among the show's highlights is the episode with then-president Barack Obama. It begins with Seinfeld knocking on the White House windows, which he later would say "was the peak of my entire existence". Critics and audiences alike praised the episode for "what could have easily come off as stilted, manufactured dribble miraculously contains a comedic spark" and for its "charming and relaxed natural moments of playfulness," as well as the chemistry between the two.

The Guardian's Stuart Heritage reviewed the later seasons of the show as degraded in quality, with the Christoph Waltz episode representing a low point that was "a betrayal of the premise [and] a slab of flabby filler to boot". With the move to Netflix, a subscription service, Heritage expected an increase of quality rather than episodes that were "exactly the same in terms of look and feel as the ones that came before," and further that the series feels more like "a product" with less creativity regarding its selection of guests.

== Awards and nominations ==
The show has earned numerous Primetime Emmy Award nominations and has won several Producers Guild awards.

Year	Award	Category	Recipients	Result	Ref.
2013	Primetime Emmy Award	Outstanding Special Class – Short-Format Nonfiction Program	Jerry Seinfeld	Nominated	
2014	Primetime Emmy Award	Outstanding Short-Format Nonfiction Program	Jerry Seinfeld	Nominated	
2015	Producers Guild of America Award	Outstanding Digital Series		Won	
2016	Producers Guild of America Award	Outstanding Digital Series		Won	
2016	Primetime Emmy Award	Outstanding Variety Talk Series	Jerry Seinfeld, Melissa Miller, Tammy Johnston, Denis Jensen, George Shapiro and Howard West	Nominated	
2017	Producers Guild of America Award	Outstanding Digital Series		Won	
2019	Producers Guild of America Award	Outstanding Short-Form Program		Won	
2019	Primetime Emmy Award	Outstanding Informational Series or Special	Jerry Seinfeld, George Shapiro, Tammy Johnston and Melissa Miller	Nominated	
2020	Producers Guild of America Award	Outstanding Short-Form Program		Won	
2020	Primetime Emmy Award	Outstanding Hosted Nonfiction Series or Special	Jerry Seinfeld, Tammy Johnston, George Shapiro and Dennis Jensen	Nominated	

== Legacy ==
A variant cover for the first issue of the 2022 reboot of the Batman & Superman: World's Finest comic book series features Seinfeld driving the Batmobile with Superman in the passenger seat and Batman on the back of the car, all three holding coffees in the manner of the show. A coffee table book about the show, The Comedians in Cars Getting Coffee Book, was released in 2022; Vanity Fair says the book is "a total gas".
