= Bookstore Basketball =

Basketball tournament at the University of Notre Dame

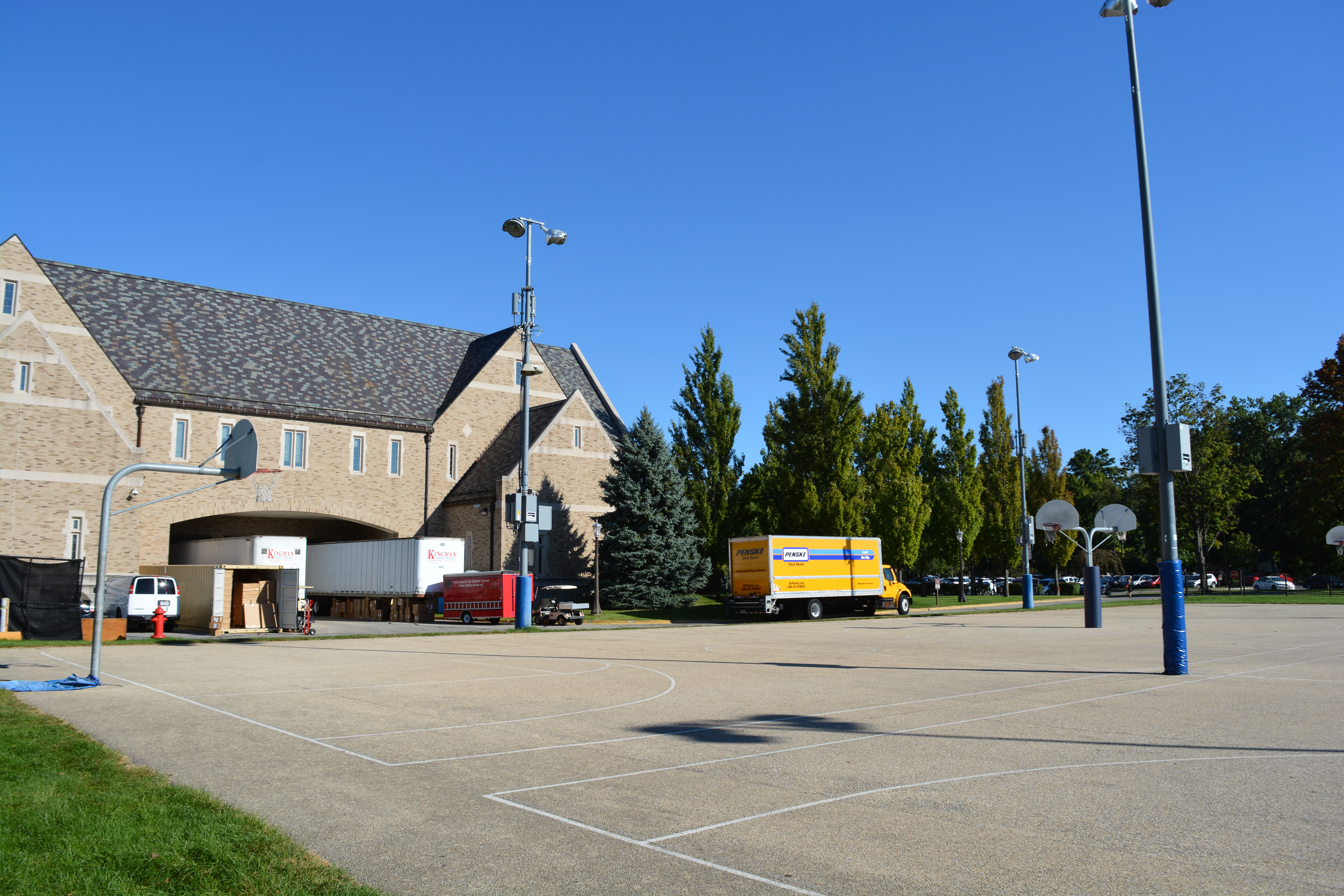
- The courts where the tournament is played

Tournament information
- Sport: Basketball
- Location: University of Notre Dame
- Month played: April
- Established: 1972
- Administrator: Bookstore Basketball Organization
- Format: Bracket (tournament)
- Teams: 700+

Current champion
- "Finnies Next Door"

Bookstore Basketball is an annual outdoor basketball tournament that takes place at the University of Notre Dame. Bookstore Basketball is the largest outdoor five-on-five tournament in the world with over 700 teams participating each year. Since 1995, Bookstore Basketball has devolved its earning to the Notre Dame Alumni Club of Jamaica to raise money for Jumpball, an organization that aims to teach fundamental life-lessons to children of Jamaica through the game of basketball. The tournament's name, coined by grad student Jimmy Brogan '70, comes from the basketball courts behind the old South Quad Bookstore, now location of the Coleman Morse Center.

The tournament was established in the spring of 1972 by student Fritz Hoefer, who conceived the idea, and Morrissey Hall president Vince Meconi, who implemented the tournament as part of the university's AnTostal, an annual spring celebrations week. The first incarnation of the games was composed of 53 teams.

Games are played to 21 points and early rounds are self-refereed. 512 teams competed for the 1983 edition, and the Guinness Book of World Records deemed it the largest five-on-five outdoor basketball tournament in the world, and today the number of teams has grown past 700. Students, faculty, and staff of the University of Notre Dame, Saint Mary's College, and Holy Cross College can participate Bookstore Basketball. Women compete in the tournament alongside the men, but additionally there is a separate women's bracket, established in 1978. Notable members of the administration, faculty, and staff have participated with as much gusto as the students, such as Joe Montana. University President at the time, Rev. Edward Malloy fielded the team All the President’s Men.

Bookstore Basketball is famous for the creativity and potential notoriety of team names and costumes. Crazy team names are always an important feature of Bookstore Basketball. Usual themes among the names are puns, innuendos, trash-talk, self-deprecation, celebrities, and current events. Some of the past names included: H1N1 Mixtape Tour: Off the Sneezy, Hoops I Did It Again, 5 Guys Even Dick Vitale Wouldn’t Watch Play Basketball, We’re Short but Slow, Picked Last in Gym Class, Unlike Tiger Our Rebounds Don’t Text Back, Weapons of Mass Seduction, and The High Five.

Number of participating teams
Year	Number of teams
1972	53
1973	105
1974	136
1975	197
1976	256
1977	256
1978	256
1979	320
1980	384
1981	384
1982	454
1983	511
1984	511
1985	560
1986	579
1987	660
1988	660
1989	672
1990	703
1991	670
1992	705
1993	530
1998	631
1999	538
2001	580
2002	598
2003	652
2004	658
2005	590
2006	610

== List of Champions ==
There have been 49 bookstore basketball open championships since the tournament was established in 1972. There have also been approximately 37 champions, with the exact number difficult to quantify based on the informality of the participating teams. The open championship is named so because both women and men are allowed to compete. In addition to the open championship, a tournament specifically for women was introduced in the 1980s, although the majority of those champions are undocumented. The tournament was canceled in 2020 because of the COVID-19 pandemic.

Year	Open Champion
1972	The Family
1973	31 Club
1974	The Ducks
1975	31 Club III
1976	TILCS III
1977	TILCS IV
1978	Leo's Last
1979	Chumps
1980	Defending Chumps
1981	Re-Classified Nads
1982	Full House
1983	Macri's Preferred Stock
1984	Macri's Deli
1985	Revenge of the Fun Bunch
1986	Lee's BBQ Roundhouse
1987	Da' Brothers Of Manhood
1988	Adworks All-Stars
1989	Malicious Prostitution
1990	Malicious Prostitution
1991	Adworks
1992	Gauchos
1993	Tequila White Lightning
1994	NBT
1995	Models, Inc.
1996	Dos Kloskas
1997	Dos Geses
1998	PRIMETIME
1999	Malicious Prostitution
2000	Keyplay.com
2001	Nylon Strokers
2002	Adworks All-Stars
2003	RBC
2004	UBS/SMG, Inc.
2005	We Get Wet
2006	U Got a Bad Draw
2007	Castle Point
2008	The Main St. Pub Saltines
2009	Hallelujah Holla Back
2010	Alexander's Grill
2011	Saturdays In America
2012	Hoops We Did It Again
2013	Hoops We Did It Again
2014	Hoops We Did It Again
2015	Finnigans
2016	Finnigans
2017	Practice Squad
2018	Practice Squad
2019	Finnies Next Door
