= Halloween (children's book) =

2002 book by Jerry Seinfeld

- Cover
- Author: Jerry Seinfeld
- Cover artist: James Bennett
- Language: English
- Series: Byron Preiss
- Genre: Comedy
- Publisher: Little, Brown Books for Young Readers
- Publication date: 2002 (hardcover), 2008 (paperback)
- Publication place: United States
- Media type: Print (hardcover, paperback)
- Pages: 32 pp
- ISBN: 0316706256 (hardcover); ISBN 0316035971 (paperback)

Halloween is a 2002 children's book written by Jerry Seinfeld and illustrated by James Bennett.

Adapted from Seinfeld's "Halloween" stand-up routine from his 1998 comedy special I'm Telling You for the Last Time, the book is a humorous description of an American Halloween from a child's point of view, from bad trick-or-treat candy to pajama-like costumes, based on the author's childhood experiences.

The book entails two dedications: one by Jerry Seinfeld and one by the illustrator, James Bennett. Jerry dedicated the book to his family, consisting of his life partner Jessica and his daughter Sascha.

According to The New York Times Halloween is "keenly observed, carefully timed, contemplative humor about life's minutiae, people's foibles and mankind's quotidian moments of angst".

The 2002 hardcover version includes a short biographical description of Jerry Seinfeld and the illustrator, James Bennett.

Before illustrating Halloween Bennett has worked for well-known brands such as Time, Sports Illustrated, Business Week, and Mad magazine. Shortly before creating the drawings in Halloween, Bennett received the Hamilton King Award from the Society of Illustrators in the category for Best Illustration of the Year.

== See also ==
- Bibliography of Halloween
