= Jimmy Brogan =

American actor and comedian (born 1948)

- Born: September 18, 1948 (age 77); Boston, Massachusetts, United States
- Education: University of Notre Dame
- Occupations: Stand-up comedian, writer, actor
- Years active: 1975–present

Jimmy Brogan (born September 18, 1948), sometimes credited as Jim Brogan, is an American stand-up comedian, writer and actor. He has made numerous stand-up appearances on the talk show circuit including The Tonight Show Starring Johnny Carson and Late Night with David Letterman. He was a writer on The Tonight Show with Jay Leno for 9 years. As an actor, he starred in the ABC sitcom Out of the Blue.

== Comedian ==
Brogan started doing stand-up comedy in New York City in 1975. Within his first year and a half of doing stand-up he was a regular performer at the Improv, Catch a Rising Star and the Comic Strip. Brogan guest starred on The Tonight Show Starring Johnny Carson 7 times from 1984 to 1992. He also appeared on Late Night with David Letterman and the Merv Griffin Show.

He hosted Laffathon on Showtime 1980–81, Comic Strip Live on Fox 1987, You Asked for It Again on the Family Channel 1992. He also hosted The Late Show on Fox in 1987 after Joan Rivers left the show. From 1992 until 2001 he appeared many times on The Tonight Show with Jay Leno doing stand-up, in written comedy pieces and in remote segments.

He acted as an audience "warm up" (performing stand up just prior to the show's taping) for sitcoms Taxi, Cheers, Newhart and Seinfeld as well as talk shows The Tonight Show with Jay Leno, Late Night with David Letterman and Oprah.

Almost every Sunday for the last 27 years, he has been opening for Jay Leno at the Comedy & Magic Club in Hermosa Beach. "Leno calls Brogan every Sunday to ask if they're riding together. 'He picks me up in one of his 80 exotic cars,' Brogan said. 'We ride in a different one every Sunday. This has been a ritual since 1991.'"

== Writer ==
Brogan served as a writer for the opening monologue on The Tonight Show with Jay Leno from 1992 to 2001. The Los Angeles Times Magazine called him "L.A.'s premier 'joke scientist' …dissecting, analyzing, adding or subtracting ingredients" in Leno's opening monologue. During the show "Jimmy would sit to one side of the audience while Jay told his jokes. On occasion, Jimmy and Jay would make a bet to see if a certain joke worked or not. If Jimmy won, Jay would walk down the stage, and pay Jimmy. If Jay won, Jimmy would come to the stage and pay off the bet. All this was done while the camera was running."

== Actor ==
In 1979, Brogan moved to Los Angeles to star in the sitcom Out of the Blue on ABC as Random the Angel. ABC aired 9 episodes, including the premiere episode which co-starred Robin Williams as Mork from Mork and Mindy. Brogan also appeared in an episode of Happy Days entitled "Chachi Sells his Soul" as Random to cross promote his show.

He had guest parts on other TV shows including Just the Ten of Us, Jerry Seinfeld’s Stand-up Confidential and Jerry Before Seinfeld.

Brogan also appeared in major motion pictures including Punchline (with Tom Hanks and Sally Field) playing the younger clergyman; Steven Soderbergh's The Informant! (with Matt Damon) as psychiatrist, Dr. Miller; and Bridesmaids (with Kristen Wiig) as the minister at the wedding.
