= Out of the Blue (1979 TV series) =

- Genre: Sitcom; Fantasy
- Created by: Thomas L. Miller; Robert L. Boyett
- Written by: Barry Kemp
- Directed by: Peter Baldwin; Jeff Chambers; Duncan Scott McGibbon; John Tracy
- Theme music composer: Charles Fox
- Country of origin: United States
- Original language: English
- No. of seasons: 1
- No. of episodes: 12 (4 unaired)

Production
- Executive producers: Austin Kalish; Irma Kalish
- Production location: Paramount Studios
- Editor: C. Cory M. McCrum-Abdo
- Camera setup: Multi-camera
- Running time: 22–24 minutes
- Production companies: Miller-Milkis Productions; Paramount Television

Original release
- Network: ABC
- Release: September 9 – December 16, 1979

Related
- Love, American Style; Happy Days; Laverne & Shirley; Blansky's Beauties; Mork & Mindy; Joanie Loves Chachi; The New Love, American Style

Out of the Blue is an American fantasy sitcom that aired on ABC from September 9 to December 16, 1979. It is chiefly notable as having featured a Mork & Mindy crossover, and for the debate surrounding its status as a spin-off of Happy Days.

== Production ==
The series stars Jimmy Brogan as Random, an angel-in-training who is assigned to live with (and act as guardian angel for) a suburban Chicago family (led by a single mom played by Dixie Carter), as well as work as a high school teacher. The series debuted on September 9, 1979, but it received poor ratings against 60 Minutes on CBS (the #1 show on TV that year) and Disney on NBC. With only seven episodes aired, ABC pulled Blue, as well as fellow freshman sitcom A New Kind of Family, after their October 21 airings. Five more episodes were produced, but only one ever aired on ABC (on December 16) before Out of the Blue was canceled.

== Spin-off debate ==
Out of the Blue has engendered debate amongst some viewers concerning its precise relationship to Happy Days. The controversy arises from the fact that the first episode of the series was broadcast a little over one week prior to an episode of Happy Days featuring Jimmy Brogan as the character Random. Television observer and owner of Sitcoms Online, Todd Fuller, maintains that because "Chachi Sells His Soul" aired on September 18, 1979, Random's appearance on this Happy Days episode was a crossover. He goes on to postulate: "The Happy Days episode was likely a promotional tool for Out of the Blue to make the character more known."

Thom Holbrook, who has a website devoted to TV crossovers and spin-offs, sees the arguments against calling it a spin-off, but ultimately concludes: "Making it a crossover would be basing things all on an odd bit of scheduling decades ago. The intent was spin off. The tone of the Happy Days episode is that of a dry run on the character, that of a pilot episode."

== Cast ==
- Jimmy Brogan as Random
- Dixie Carter as Aunt Marion
- Clark Brandon as Chris Richards #1
- Olivia Barash as Laura Richards
- Tammy Lauren as Stacey Richards
- Jason Keller as Jason Richards
- Shane Keller as Shane Richards
- Hannah Dean as Gladys
- Rad Daily as Chris Richards #2
- Eileen Heckart as The Boss Angel

=== Guest stars ===
- Robin Williams as Mork from Ork
- Tim Conway as Wally Richards

== Episodes ==
No.	Title	Original release date
1	"Random's Arrival"	September 9, 1979
A not-so-perfect angel named Random must prove his heavenly powers to a brood of newly orphaned children by conjuring up a visit from the unpredictable Mork from Ork.
2	"The Random Bust"	September 16, 1979
Random takes the rap but keeps everyone off balance by popping in and out of jail as he tries to help Chris, the real culprit, decide whether to confess to being an accessory in a school burglary.
3	"The Hustle"	September 23, 1979
The kids lose the money for Aunt Marion's birthday present to a sneaky pool hustler.
4	"Laura, the Runaway"	September 30, 1979
Random tries to convince runaway Laura to give up her job as a truck-stop waitress and come home.
5	"Out for the Season"	October 7, 1979
When Chris injures his knee and can't play football, the kids turn to Random for a miraculous healing.
6	"Stacey's Nightmare"	October 14, 1979
Random uses some heavenly magic to cure Stacey's recurring nightmare by arranging for her to meet "the monster of her dreams".
7	"The Coin of Truth"	October 21, 1979
When Random's magic coin falls into the wrong hands, it makes for volatile comedy as everyone in the family starts revealing exactly how they feel about each other.
8	"Double Jeopardy"	December 16, 1979
Random's heavenly diplomacy is put to a test when he attempts to show the merits of being twins to Jason and Shane, who have tired of being carbon copies of each other.
9	"Random, Who?"	Unaired
10	"The Reluctant Angel"	Unaired
11	"Keeping the Housekeeper"	Unaired
12	"The Thanksgiving Story"	Unaired
