= Stand-Up Confidential =

- Video Box Cover
- Written by: Jerry Seinfeld; Joel Hodgson
- Directed by: Bruce Gowers
- Starring: Jerry Seinfeld; Joel Hodgson
- Music by: Kevin Kiner
- Country of origin: United States
- Original language: English

Production
- Producers: George Shapiro; Howard West
- Editors: Ron Andreassen; Michael Polito
- Running time: 55 minutes
- Production company: Shapiro/West Productions

Original release
- Network: HBO
- Release: September 5, 1987

Stand-Up Confidential is a 1987 stand-up comedy special and the first starring Jerry Seinfeld. It was then re-released on VHS in 1993 when the television show Seinfeld was gaining popularity.

== Production ==
Some skit inserts were co-written by Joel Hodgson. The special aired on HBO on September 5, 1987 from The Improv at Los Angeles, California.

== Cast ==
- Carl Reiner as Host (uncredited)
- Jerry Seinfeld as Himself
- Joel Hodgson as Cast Member
- Bernadette Birkett as Cast Member
- Jimmy Brogan as Cast Member
- John Carney as Cast Member
- Jann Karam as Cast Member
- Carol Leifer as Cast Member
- Larry Miller as Cast Member
- Suzy Ekerling as Kid In Classroom
- Hugh O'Neill as Kid In Classroom
- Tarrish Potter as Kid In Classroom
- Bo Sharon as Kid In Classroom

== See also ==
- Comedians in Cars Getting Coffee
- Mystery Science Theater 3000
