= SeinLanguage =

1993 book by Jerry Seinfeld

- First edition cover.
- Author: Jerry Seinfeld
- Cover artist: Annie Leibovitz
- Language: English
- Genre: Comedy
- Publisher: Bantam
- Publication date: 1993 (hardcover), 1995 (Paperback)
- Publication place: United States
- Media type: Print (Hardcover, Paperback)
- Pages: 180 pp
- ISBN: 0-553-09606-0 (hardcover); ISBN 0-553-56915-5 (paperback)
- OCLC: 31774544
- LC Class: 93-14467

SeinLanguage is a 1993 book written by Jerry Seinfeld. SeinLanguage was critically acclaimed and scored a spot on the New York Times Best Seller list. The title is a pun on "sign language."

== Contents ==
- Introduction
- Freeway of Love
  - Jokes about dating, sex, and relationships
- Personal Maintenance
  - Jokes about health and physical appearance
- Paldom
  - Jokes about friendship and phone calls
- Shut Up and Drive
  - Jokes about driving and air travel
- Job Security
  - Jokes about office life and various vocations
- The Thing Is the Thing
  - Jokes about money, crime, and television
- Out and Back
  - Jokes about sports, going out, and apartments
- The Ride of Your Life
  - Jokes about childhood, parents, and old age
