= Is This Anything? (book) =

2020 non-fiction book by Jerry Seinfeld

- First edition cover.
- Author: Jerry Seinfeld
- Language: English
- Genre: Comedy
- Publisher: Simon & Schuster
- Publication date: October 6, 2020
- Publication place: United States
- Media type: Print (Hardcover, E-book) and Audiobook
- Pages: 480 pp
- ISBN: 978-1982112691 (13); ISBN 1982112697 (10)

Is This Anything? is a 2020 book written by Jerry Seinfeld.

The book is a collection of Seinfeld's comedic writings over the span of his 45-year career and compiles some of his best jokes. The title is based on the main question a comedian asks when they are testing out new material. The book scored a spot on the New York Times Best Seller list.

== Contents ==
The book is split up by decade from the 1970s to the 2010s.
