= Barry Marder =

American comedian, actor and writer (1949–2026)

Barry Marder (May 23, 1949 – September 21, 2026) was an American stand-up comedian, actor, author and comedy writer. He is identified with the characters of Ted L. Nancy (author of the Letters from a Nut series of books) and Ed Broth (author of Stories From A Moron: Real Stories Rejected by Real Magazines). He opened regularly for Jerry Seinfeld's stand-up act, and he co-wrote the DreamWorks animated film Bee Movie.

== Career ==
Marder performed as the opening act for Jerry Seinfeld throughout the US. He wrote for Bill Maher, Jay Leno, David Letterman, and the talk show Night Stand with Dick Dietrick. He co-wrote Bee Movie for the DreamWorks, along with Jerry Seinfeld, Spike Feresten, and Andy Robin, that was released November 2, 2007. Marder appeared on Seinfeld's internet series Comedians in Cars Getting Coffee on September 6, 2012 in the episode "You Don't Want to Offend a Cannibal", and on July 19, 2019, in the episode "Big Lots and BevMo!" In 1984, he appeared in a comedy film, Where the Boys Are '84, as the character Rappaport.

=== Early projects ===
In 2005, Seinfeld, Marder, and Kenneth Braun signed a deal for an animated comedy series pilot based on Stories From A Moron.

=== Other personas ===
On the Ted L. Nancy official website, Marder confessed to being both "Ted L. Nancy" and "Ed Broth." The books of both Broth and Ted L. Nancy include a foreword by Seinfeld, who claims in both books to have met with each author. In the foreword to Stories From A Moron, Seinfeld describes Broth as a "friend," and states that his stories "…don't completely make sense, but they don't make nonsense either…"

==== Ted L. Nancy ====
Under the pseudonym "Ted L. Nancy," Marder wrote a series of books containing excerpts of his prank letters, together with their responses. Books in the series include: Letters from a Nut, More Letters from a Nut, Extra Nutty! Even More Letters from a Nut, Hello Junk Mail!, Ted L. Nancy’s Afternoon Stories, and All New Letters from a Nut. Comedian Bruce Baum is the co-author of the first three books. In 2013, Scholastic published an historical Ted L. Nancy book entitled Letters From A Nut's Family Tree.

In 2002, ABC developed a pilot for a television series based on Letters From A Nut. It was written and produced by Marder and Seinfeld. In 2003 FX Television made a pilot for "The Ted L. Nancy Show." That show was written and produced by Marder and Seinfeld. Again in 2007, Lionsgate Television optioned the books from Marder to make into a television show, as reported by Daily Variety. The following year, Lionsgate sold the show as a pilot presentation to Fox TV. That show, called Sincerely, Ted L. Nancy, is created and written by Seinfeld, Marder and Chuck Martin. In the pilot, Ted L. Nancy (Kevin Sussman) is the voice for the underdog consumer who is usually the last to get help from customer service.

In April 2016, the first two episodes of Ted L. Nancy's SCAMMERS appeared on Hulu. The shorts were produced with Robert Redford's Sundance Productions. In these, Ted L. Nancy answers unscrupulous people who promise him great wealth through emails.

==== Ed Broth ====
Under the pseudonym "Ed Broth" (at one time thought by some to be a real prank author who submits joke letters to organizations and then publishes their responses), Marder wrote Stories From A Moron: Real Stories Rejected by Real Magazines, published in January 2005 by St. Martin's Press. The covers of the Ed Broth books show the title and author's name written childishly. The book comprises numerous prank letters the Ed Broth persona mailed to magazines along with their responses. One example is his essay entitled "I Love Dogs", that was sent to the publishers of I Love Cats magazine. The book's dust jacket description of Ed Broth states that "…[Broth] is a writer living in Toluca Lake, California. He likes pimentos in his potato salad". Jerry Seinfeld hosted a toast in his honor, although Ed Broth was not in attendance. Ed Broth's most recent literary project is a book of cartoons called "The Oddvious". Many believe the illustrator of "The Oddvious" is Alan Marder, who also illustrated "Stories From A Moron: Real Stories Rejected by Real Magazines"; "Letters From a Nut"; and "Hello Junk Mail!" by Ted L. Nancy.

== Other projects ==
=== "Letters From A Nut: The Play" ===
In June 2017 the "Letters From A Nut" Play was presented at the Geffen Playhouse in Los Angeles for a five-week run. Ted L. Nancy read his letters and Beth Kennedy read the replies bringing the books to life. Video and artwork by Alan Marder accompanied the presentation.

In 2019, Patrick Warburton toured the country with a different version of the Letters From A Nut Play. Warburton read the letters as the Ted L. Nancy character with rotating actors in the Service Rep role.

=== Unfrosted ===
Netflix won a bidding war for the film, Unfrosted, in June 2021. It stars, and is directed by, Jerry Seinfeld. It is written by Seinfeld, Feresten, and Marder. The film premiered at Grauman's Egyptian Theater in Hollywood on April 30, 2024. The film was released on Netflix on May 3, 2024.

== Death ==
Marder died on September 21, 2026, at the age of 77.

== See also ==
- Henry Root
- Silly Beggar
- Robert Popper
