= Comic Strip Live =

Stand-up comedy club in New York City

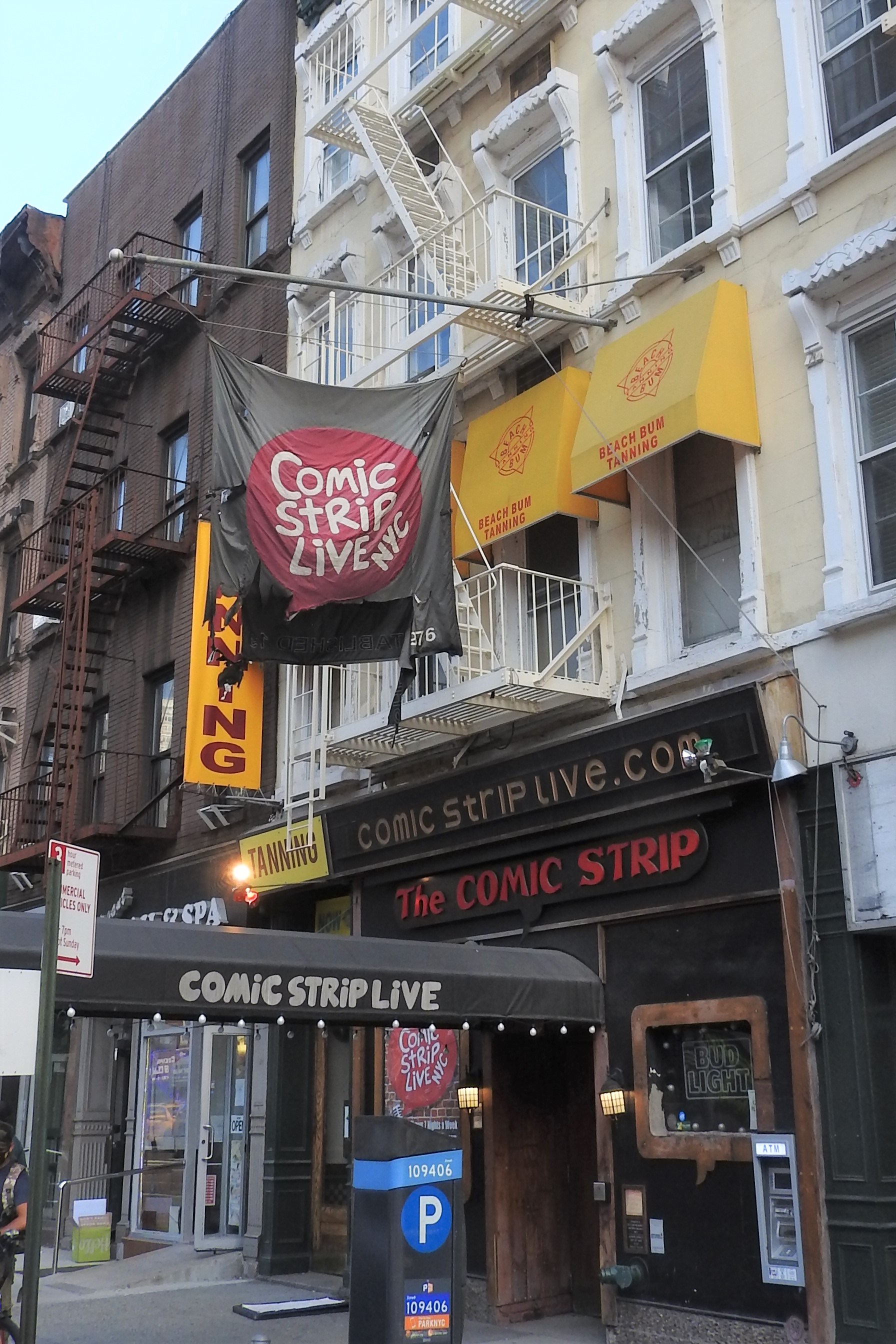
- Interactive map of Comic Strip Live
- Address: 1568 Second Avenue
- Location: New York City, New York, United States
- Coordinates: 40°46′29.5″N 73°57′13.5″W
- Type: Comedy club

Website
- comicstriplive.com

The Comic Strip Live is the oldest stand-up comedy showcase club in New York City, located at 1568 Second Avenue (between 81st and 82nd Streets).

== History ==
The Comic Strip was opened in 1976. Richard Tienken and Robert Wachs were two of the club's founders. Before emerging as a venue spotlighting only stand up comedians, the club originally featured singers, magicians, and novelty acts. Chris Rock used to stack chairs to get stage time and Colin Quinn was a bartender at the club.

In 2017 Jerry Seinfeld returned to the club to shoot his Netflix special, Jerry Before Seinfeld; he had first performed at the club in 1976. Adam Sandler also shot part of his 2018 special 100% Fresh at the club.

== Present ==
Primarily a showcase club, the Comic Strip encourages performers to consistently write, perform and perfect new material. Once a year, the club holds an "Audition Lottery", where aspiring newcomers line up to be given a date to try out their routine on "Audition Night". If they do well, the club's talent booker passes them. "Passing" means getting a chance to work late night, where they perfect their acts. This occurs weeknights after the regular show has ended.

== Guinness World Record ==
From June 3, 2008 through June 5 the Comic Strip Live broke the Guinness World Record for the Longest Continuous Stand Up Comedy Show, finishing at slightly beyond the 50-hour mark. The entire event was hosted by William Stephenson and included performances by Dave Attell, Judah Friedlander, Ted Alexandro, Tony Rock, Jeffrey Ross, Mike Birbiglia, Judy Gold, Rich Vos, and Greg Giraldo.

== Notable alumni ==
- Ted Alexandro
- Dan Allen
- Aziz Ansari
- Dave Attell
- Ben Bailey
- Greer Barnes
- Charlie Barnett
- D. C. Benny
- Mike Birbiglia
- Scott Blakeman
- Vinnie Brand
- Kevin Brennan
- Jim Breuer
- Eddie Brill
- Jimmy Brogan
- Louis C.K.
- Bryan Callen
- Mario Cantone
- George Carlin
- Dave Chappelle
- Dane Cook
- Tom Cotter
- Sunda Croonquist
- Rodney Dangerfield
- Ellen DeGeneres
- Ray Ellin
- Susie Essman
- Jimmy Fallon
- Wayne Federman
- Christian Finnegan
- Judah Friedlander
- Jim Gaffigan
- Elon Gold
- Judy Gold
- Bobcat Goldthwait
- Gilbert Gottfried
- Darrell Hammond
- J. R. Havlan
- John Henson
- Vanessa Hollingshead
- Cory Kahaney
- Artie Lange
- Carol Leifer
- Kerri Louise
- Bill Maher
- Jackie Martling
- Dennis Miller
- Larry Miller
- Eddie Murphy
- Dan Naturman
- Kevin Nealon
- Big Jay Oakerson
- Patton Oswalt
- Rick Overton
- Joe Piscopo
- Richard Pryor
- Colin Quinn
- Paul Reiser
- Caroline Rhea
- Chris Rock
- Tony Rock
- Seth Rogen
- Ray Romano
- Jeffrey Ross
- Angel Salazar
- Adam Sandler
- Steven Scott
- Jerry Seinfeld
- Rick Shapiro
- Sarah Silverman
- Spanky
- Jon Stewart
- Jeff Stilson
- Wanda Sykes
- George Wallace
- Damon Wayans
- Robin Williams
- Dennis Wolfberg
