= 23 Hours to Kill =

2020 stand-up comedy special

23 Hours to Kill is a 2020 stand-up comedy special starring Jerry Seinfeld. The special debuted on Netflix on May 5, 2020. It was taped in October 2019 at the Beacon Theatre in New York City. It is the second stand-up special Seinfeld has done for Netflix in a two-part deal that started with the 2017 special, Jerry Before Seinfeld. The teaser from Netflix was released on April 23, 2020, with a secret agent theme. The special is one hour long and covers topics including "talking vs. texting, bad buffets vs. so-called 'great' restaurants, and the magic of Pop-Tarts".

== Reception ==
Brian Logan of The Guardian gave the special four out of five stars, saying "Finding a novel angle on everything from Pop-Tarts to the annoyances of modern technology, the American everyman is still on sparkling form." Richard Roeper of the Chicago Sun-Times gave it three and one-half stars out of four, saying "It's classic cranky Seinfeld, but there's such a spring in his step as he moves about the stage, such a twinkle in his eye as his voice goes higher, to the point where he sounds like everyone's not-good imitation of Jerry Seinfeld, that none of it comes across as angry."

== See also ==
- Jerry Seinfeld § Discography
