= Comedian (film) =

2002 American film

- Theatrical release poster
- Directed by: Christian Charles
- Produced by: Gary Streiner
- Starring: Jerry Seinfeld
- Cinematography: Christian Charles; Gary Streiner
- Edited by: Chris Franklin
- Distributed by: Miramax Films
- Release date: October 11, 2002
- Running time: 81 minutes
- Country: United States
- Language: English
- Box office: $2,751,988

Comedian is a 2002 American documentary film focused primarily on comedian Jerry Seinfeld as he develops a new stand-up comedy act.

== Synopsis ==
The film follows comedian Jerry Seinfeld as he develops an entirely new act, having retired his old stand-up comedy act after wrapping production on his enormously successful sitcom Seinfeld and recording the 1998 HBO comedy special I'm Telling You for the Last Time. Seinfeld's efforts are paralleled with the struggles of up-and-coming comedian Orny Adams to make it in show business, and during filming both stand-ups appeared on different episodes of Late Show with David Letterman—Adams for the first time, and Seinfeld for the first time in a while. The many other recognizable comedians who appear in the film, some of whom talk with Seinfeld about their craft, and some of whom are only glimpsed briefly, include (in order of appearance): Greg Giraldo, Jim Norton, Colin Quinn, George Wallace, Robert Klein, Tom Papa, Mario Joyner, Ray Romano, Godfrey, Chris Rock, Garry Shandling, Kevin Nealon, Jay Leno, and Bill Cosby.

== Advertising ==
The film's unusual trailer did not feature any footage from the film, instead featuring famous voice-over artist Hal Douglas in a recording booth repeating cliches from action movie trailers to the frustration of the filmmakers.

== Release ==
The film was theatrically released in the United States on October 11, 2002, and grossed almost $2.8 million domestically.

== Reception ==
On review aggregator website Rotten Tomatoes, the film has an approval rating of 77% based on reviews from 91 critics, with an average score of 6.8 out of 10. The website's "critics' consensus" reads: "Comedian is an insightful look at the hard work of creating comedy." Metacritic, which uses a weighted average, assigned the film a score of 62 out of 100, based on 28 critics, indicating "generally favorable" reviews.

Roger Ebert gave the film 2 out of 4 stars. Owen Gleiberman of Entertainment Weekly gave it a "B" grade.
