= Howard West =

American talent agent and TV producer (1931–2015)

Howard West (September 24, 1931 – December 3, 2015) was an American talent agent and television producer best known for his work with long-term partner George Shapiro in producing and managing Jerry Seinfeld.

West and Shapiro, who were childhood friends in the Bronx, New York City, were partners in the company Shapiro/West and Associates.

He died of a stroke in Los Angeles, California, aged 84.
