= I'm Telling You for the Last Time =

1998 stand-up comedy special starring Jerry Seinfeld

- Video Box Cover
- Written by: Jerry Seinfeld
- Directed by: Marty Callner
- Starring: Jerry Seinfeld
- Music by: Michael Kamen
- Country of origin: United States
- Original language: English

Production
- Producers: Bill Brigode; Marty Callner; Randall Gladstein; Jerry Seinfeld; Jeff Thorsen
- Cinematography: Gabriel Beristain
- Running time: 75 minutes
- Production company: HBO

Original release
- Network: HBO
- Release: August 9, 1998

I'm Telling You for the Last Time

Live album by Jerry Seinfeld
- Released: September 22, 1998
- Recorded: August 6–9, 1998; Recorded on Remote Recording's Silver Truck
- Venue: Broadhurst Theatre
- Genre: Comedy
- Length: 72:27
- Label: Universal Records

Jerry Seinfeld chronology
Stand-Up Confidential (1987)	I'm Telling You for the Last Time (1998)	Jerry Before Seinfeld (2017)

I'm Telling You for the Last Time is a 1998 stand-up comedy special and the second starring Jerry Seinfeld. The special aired live on HBO on August 9, 1998, from the Broadhurst Theatre in New York City. It was then released as an album on cassette and CD by the same title that same year. In 1999, a VHS and DVD titled Jerry Seinfeld: I'm Telling You for the Last Time - Live on Broadway was released.

The recording was taped just a couple of months after the show Seinfeld went off the air. Entertainment Weekly said about the album: "On its own, the CD is a more than respectable stand-up disc; Seinfeld's riffs ... are worthy of preservation." I'm Telling You for the Last Time was nominated for a 1999 Grammy Award for Best Spoken Comedy Album. After recording this special/album, Seinfeld vowed never to use old material again, referencing his repeated use of "bits" from Seinfeld.

Professional ratings
Review scores
Source	Rating
AllMusic	4.5/5 stars
Entertainment Weekly	A−

== Album ==
=== Track listing ===
1. "Intro/Phones"
2. "Cab Drivers"
3. "Air Travel"
4. "Florida"
5. "Halloween"
6. "Supermarkets"
7. "Drugstores"
8. "Doctors"
9. "Men and Women"
10. "Chinese People"
11. "McDonalds"
12. "Olympics"
13. "Scuba Diving"
14. "No. 1 Fear"
15. "Sky Diving/The Helmet"
16. "Clothing"
17. "Late TV"
18. "Crooks"
19. "Horses"
20. "Bathroom"
21. "Q+A"

=== Production ===
At the beginning of the special, there is a pre-taped bit of a funeral where Jerry is burying his old material. Mourners include fellow comedians, George Carlin, Robert Klein, Garry Shandling, Ed McMahon, Paul Reiser, Jay Leno, George Wallace, Larry Miller, and Alan King.

== Awards ==
In 1999, the special was nominated for 2 Primetime Emmy Awards in Outstanding Variety, Music or Comedy Special and Outstanding Technical Direction/Camera/Video for a Special.

The American Comedy Awards nominated Jerry for the Funniest Male Performer in a TV Special and the Directors Guild of America Awards nominated Marty Callner for Outstanding Directorial Achievement in Musical/Variety.

=== Weekly charts ===
Chart performance for I'm Telling You for the Last Time
Chart (1998–99)	Peak position
Australian Albums (ARIA)	11
Canadian Top 100 Albums/100 CDs (RPM)	39
New Zealand Albums (RMNZ)	23
US Billboard 200	59

=== Year-end charts ===
Year-end chart performance for I'm Telling You for the Last Time
Chart (1998)	Position
Australian Albums (ARIA)	79

=== Certifications ===
Sales certifications for I'm Telling You for the Last Time
Region	Certification	Certified units/sales
Australia (ARIA)	Gold	35,000^{^}
Canada (Music Canada)	Gold	50,000^{^}
New Zealand (RMNZ)	Platinum	15,000^{^}
United States (RIAA)	Platinum	1,000,000^{^}
^{^} Shipments figures based on certification alone.
