= Fiddler's Elbow Country Club =

3 course private club

Coordinates: 40.6442°N 74.7159°W

Fiddler's Elbow Country Club is a private country club located in Bedminster, New Jersey, United States. Fiddler's Elbow is the only private club in New Jersey with three 18-hole championship golf courses.

== Early history ==
During the late 19th century and the early 1920s, much of the Fiddler's Elbow property was owned by James Nelson Pidcock, who grew peaches on it . By the 1920s, the Fiddler's Elbow property was part of a 20,000 acre estate owned by investment banker Clarence Dillon and his wife, Anne.

In 1935, the Dillons sold 530 acres along both sides of the Black River to investment banker Frederick Strong Moseley Jr. and his wife, Jane Hamilton Brady. Moseley hosted many elaborate fox hunts on his estate, complete with foot Basset Hounds, foxhounds and horses.

After Jane Moseley died, Frederick Moseley sold the Fiddler's Elbow property, which was then converted into a dairy farm.

== Conversion to country club ==
In 1964, Raymond J. Donovan and Ronald A. Schiavone bought the Fiddler's Elbow property and transformed it into the Fiddler's Elbow Country Club. It opened in 1965 with its original 27 holes of golf—the Red, Blue and Green Courses—designed by Hal Purdy. In 1986, the 9-hole Silver Course opened, and the Green Course was renamed the Gold Course in honor of golf course architect Brian Silva. Rees Jones began work on a third course in 1992.

By 1994, Fiddler's Elbow had 54 holes of golf, making it the largest golf facility in New Jersey.

== Location ==
Fiddler's Elbow is located in both Somerset County, New Jersey and Hunterdon County, New Jersey. The property abuts the Lamington River. The main entrance is located on Rattlesnake Bridge Road, adjacent to Interstate 78. The property comprises over 1,200 acres (4.9 km^{2}).

== Clubhouse ==
Built of Pennsylvania fieldstone in the 1930s, the three-level Clubhouse is in the English manor house style.

The Ground Level houses the Elbow Room Bar and Grill, the members' dining venue. The Somerset Ballroom includes chandeliers, a vaulted ceiling and high windows, plus a stage, dance floor and patio.

The Second Level contains the Reagan Room, which hosted President Ronald Reagan while he was campaigning in New Jersey. The Lower Level contains the Wine Cellar, locker rooms, and The Grill Room.

== Courses ==
Today Fiddler's Elbow remains the only country club in New Jersey with three championship courses.

- The Blue-Red Course, designed around the Lamington River, was renamed the River Course.
- The Gold-Silver Course, a former pasture, was renamed the Meadow Course.
- The newest course, lying within a plantation of white pines, beeches, oaks and other hardwoods, was named the Forest Course.

== Other facilities ==
Over the past 50 years, the owners have made significant upgrades to the Fidddler's Elbow property. They built a new practice facility. Several holes on the Meadow Course were redesigned by architect Steven Kay. The Dining facilities, pro shop, cart barn and locker room were upgraded.

In 2014-2015, the club opened the Sports and Leisure Center, featuring an aquatics facility, five Har-Tru clay tennis courts, a fitness center, and poolside dining.
