= Jerry Seinfeld =

American comedian and actor (born 1954)

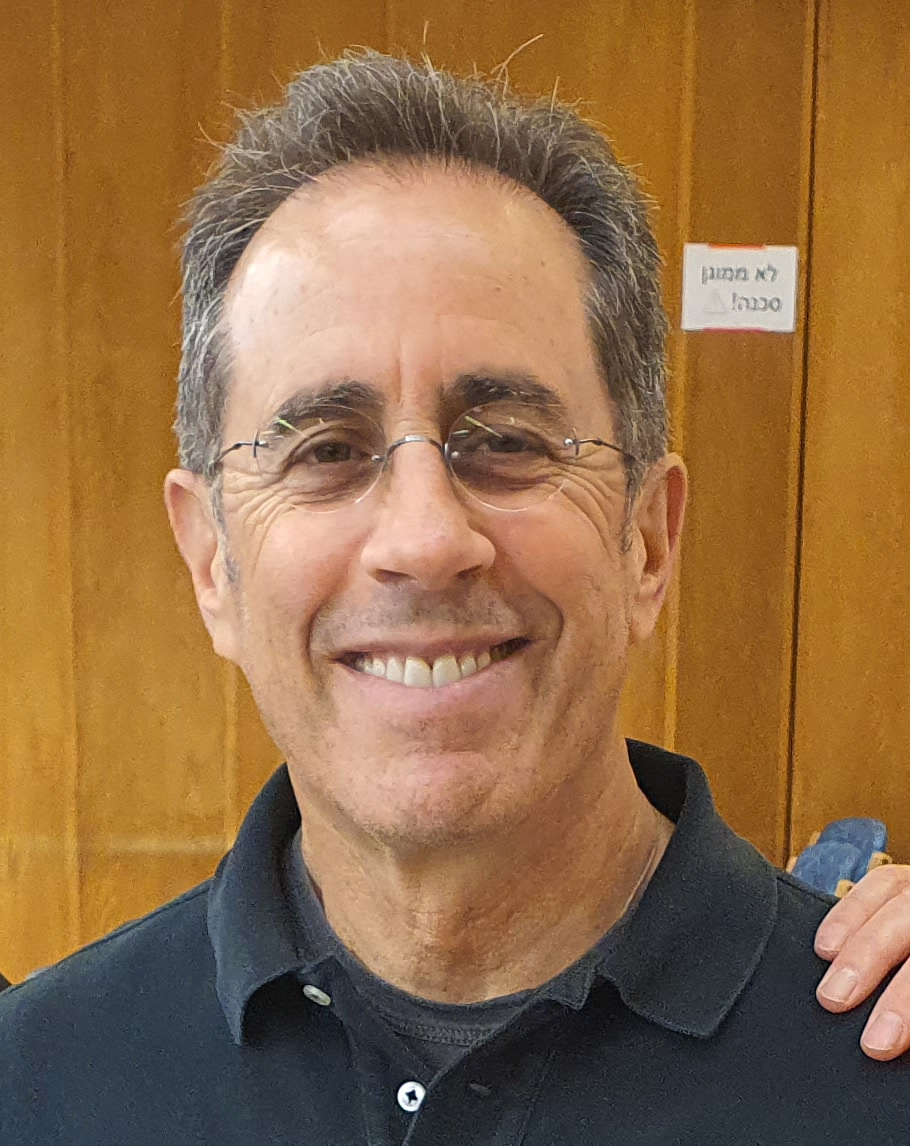
- Seinfeld in 2023
- Born: Jerome Allen Seinfeld; April 29, 1954 (age 72); Brooklyn, New York City, U.S.
- Education: Queens College (BA)
- Spouse: Jessica Sklar (m. 1999)
- Children: 3

Comedy career
- Years active: 1976–present
- Medium: Stand-up; television; film
- Genres: Observational comedy; clean comedy; cringe comedy; surreal humor; deadpan; satire
- Subjects: American culture; everyday life; gender differences; human behavior; social awkwardness; pop culture; current events
- Website: jerryseinfeld.com

Jerome Allen Seinfeld (/ˈsaɪnfɛld/ SYNE-feld; born April 29, 1954) is an American stand-up comedian, actor, writer, filmmaker, and television producer specializing in observational comedy. Seinfeld gained stardom playing a fictionalized version of himself in the NBC sitcom Seinfeld (1989–1998), which he co-created and wrote with Larry David. Seinfeld earned a Golden Globe Award for Best Actor – Television Series Musical or Comedy. The show is one of the most acclaimed and popular sitcoms of all time. He has since created and produced the reality series The Marriage Ref (2010–2011), and created and hosted the web series Comedians in Cars Getting Coffee (2012–2019), the latter of which earned him three Webby Awards. He also co-produced, co-wrote, and starred in the DreamWorks animated film Bee Movie (2007) and the Netflix comedy Unfrosted (2024).

He has released four standup specials, his first being Stand-Up Confidential (1987), followed by I'm Telling You for the Last Time (1998), Jerry Before Seinfeld (2017) and 23 Hours to Kill (2020).

Seinfeld has received numerous accolades including a Primetime Emmy Award, a Golden Globe Award, and three Actor Awards as well as nominations for four Grammy Awards. In 2004, Comedy Central named him the 12th-greatest stand-up comedian of all time. In 2017, Rolling Stone named him the 7th-greatest stand-up comedian of all time.

Seinfeld has also written three books starting with SeinLanguage (1993), followed by the children's book Halloween (2002), and the comedic compilation book Is This Anything? (2020). He practices transcendental meditation. He is married to author and philanthropist Jessica Seinfeld, with whom he has three children.

== Early life and education ==
Jerome Allen Seinfeld was born on April 29, 1954, to a Jewish family in Brooklyn, New York City. His father, Kalmen Seinfeld, a sign painter, was from Brooklyn and collected jokes that he heard while serving in World War II. His mother, Betty (born Hosni) and her parents, Selim and Salha Hosni, were Syrian Jews from Aleppo. Their nationality was stated as Turkish when they immigrated in 1917, as Syria was under the Ottoman Empire. Seinfeld has an older sister, Carolyn. Salha's mother, Garez Dayan, Seinfeld's great-grandmother, was a member of the Dayan rabbinic family, who claim ancestry back to the Medieval Exilarchs, and from the Exilarchs back to the Biblical King David. Seinfeld's second cousin is alternative metal musician and actor Evan Seinfeld.

Seinfeld grew up in Massapequa, on Long Island, in Nassau County and attended Massapequa High School. At 16, he spent time volunteering in Kibbutz Sa'ar in Israel. He attended the State University of New York at Oswego, and transferred after his second year to Queens College of the City University of New York in Flushing, from which he graduated in 1976 with a Bachelor of Arts degree in communications and theater.

== Career ==
=== 1976–1987: Rise to prominence ===
Seinfeld developed an interest in stand-up comedy after brief stints in college productions. He appeared on open-mic nights at Budd Friedman's Improv Club while attending Queens College. After graduation in 1976, he tried out at an open-mic night at New York City's Catch a Rising Star, which led to an appearance in a Rodney Dangerfield HBO special. In 1980, he had a small recurring role on the sitcom Benson, playing Frankie, a mail-delivery boy who had comedy routines that no one wanted to hear. Seinfeld was abruptly fired from the show due to creative differences. Seinfeld said that he was not told he had been fired until he arrived for a read-through session and found that there was no script for him. In January 1981, he performed stand-up on An Evening at the Improv. In May, Seinfeld made an appearance on The Tonight Show Starring Johnny Carson, impressing Carson and the audience, leading to frequent appearances on that show and others, including Late Night with David Letterman. On September 5, 1987, his first one-hour special Stand-Up Confidential aired live on HBO.

=== 1988–1998: Seinfeld and stardom ===
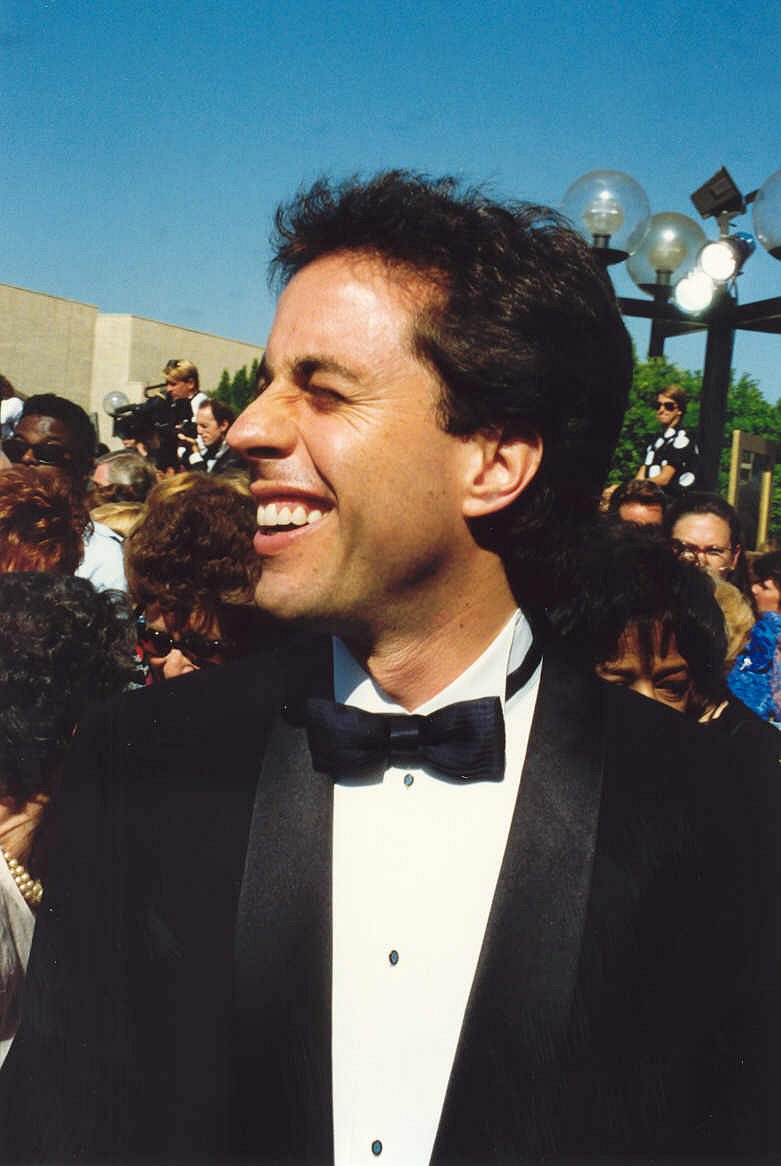
Seinfeld at the 44th Primetime Emmy Awards in 1992

Seinfeld created The Seinfeld Chronicles with Larry David in 1988 for NBC. It was renamed Seinfeld to avoid confusion with the short-lived teen sitcom The Marshall Chronicles. By its third season, Seinfeld had become the most watched sitcom on American television. The final episode aired in 1998, and the show has been a popular syndicated re-run ever since. NBC offered Seinfeld $110 million—a record $5 million an episode for a 22-episode tenth season—but he declined. Along with Seinfeld, the show starred Saturday Night Live alumna Julia Louis-Dreyfus and established actors Michael Richards and Jason Alexander. Alexander played George, a caricature of Larry David. Seinfeld is the only actor to appear in every episode.

=== 1998–2010: Established career ===
After he ended his sitcom, Seinfeld moved back to New York City and returned to stand-up comedy instead of staying in Los Angeles and furthering his acting career. In 1998, he went on tour and recorded a comedy special, titled I'm Telling You for the Last Time. The process of developing and performing new material at clubs around the world was chronicled in a 2002 documentary, Comedian, which also featured fellow comic Orny Adams and was directed by Christian Charles. Seinfeld has written several books, mostly archives of past routines. In the late 1990s, Apple Computer came up with the advertising slogan "Think different" and produced a 60-second commercial to promote the slogan. This commercial showed people who were able to "think differently", such as Albert Einstein, Mahatma Gandhi, Martin Luther King Jr., and many others. It was later cut short to 30 seconds and altered such that Seinfeld was included at the end, although he had not been in the original cut. This shorter version of the commercial aired only once, during the series finale of Seinfeld.

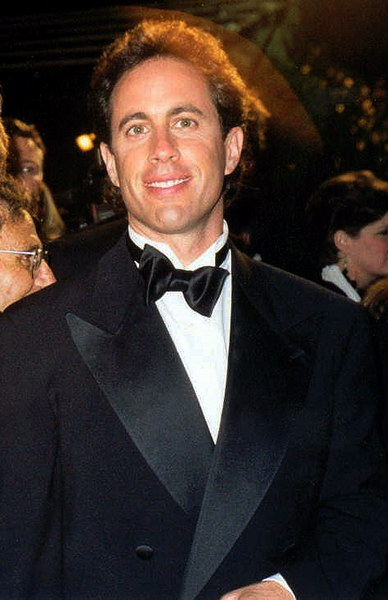
Seinfeld at the 49th Primetime Emmy Awards in 1997

In 2004, Seinfeld appeared in two commercial webisodes promoting American Express, titled The Adventures of Seinfeld & Superman. In these, Seinfeld appeared with a cartoon rendering of Superman, to whom reference was made in numerous episodes of Seinfeld as Seinfeld's hero, voiced by Patrick Warburton (character David Puddy on Seinfeld). The webisodes were directed by Barry Levinson and aired briefly on television. Seinfeld and "Superman" were also interviewed by Matt Lauer in a specially recorded interview for the Today show. Also that year, Seinfeld appeared at the National Museum of American History to donate the "puffy shirt" he wore in the Seinfeld episode of the same name. He joked it was "the most embarrassing moment in the history of the Smithsonian... a new low," but that he was proud of the honor. In 2006, Seinfeld had a cameo appearance on Saturday Night Live as host Julia Louis-Dreyfus' assassin. Louis-Dreyfus in her opening monologue mentioned the "Seinfeld curse". While talking about how ridiculous the "curse" was, a stage light suddenly fell next to her. The camera moved to a catwalk above the stage where Seinfeld was standing, holding a large pair of bolt cutters. He angrily muttered, "Damn it!" upset that it did not hit her. Louis-Dreyfus continued to say that she is indeed not cursed.

Seinfeld appeared at the 79th Academy Awards in 2007 as the presenter for Best Documentary. Before announcing the nominations, he did a monologue about the unspoken agreement between movie theater owners and movie patrons. On October 4, 2007, Seinfeld made a guest appearance as himself in the 30 Rock episode "SeinfeldVision". On February 24, 2008, at the 80th Academy Awards, Seinfeld appeared as the voice of his Bee Movie animated character Barry, presenting Best Animated Short Film. Before announcing the nominees, he showed a montage of film clips featuring bees, saying that they were some of his early work (as Barry).

Amidst his spring 2008 tour, Seinfeld performed in his hometown of New York City for a one-night-only show at the Hammerstein Ballroom to benefit Stand Up for a Cure, a charity aiding lung cancer research at Memorial Sloan Kettering Cancer Center. That fall, Seinfeld became the pitchman for Windows Vista, as part of a $300-million advertising campaign by Microsoft. The ads, which were intended to create interest for Windows in support of the subsequent "I'm a PC" advertisements, were cut from television after three installments; Microsoft opted to continue with the "I'm a PC" advertisements and run the Seinfeld ads on the Microsoft website as a series of longer advertisements. In 2009, Seinfeld and the entire cast of Seinfeld appeared for a reunion in Larry David's HBO series Curb Your Enthusiasm. The fictional reunion took place in the seventh season's finale and starred most of the original cast, including Julia Louis-Dreyfus, Jason Alexander, Michael Richards, in a multiple-episode arc. Seinfeld appeared on an episode of the Starz original series Head Case. As was the case in many of his previous guest appearances on sitcoms, he played himself.

In Australia, Seinfeld appeared on a series of advertisements for the Greater Building Society, a building society based in New South Wales and southeastern Queensland. His appearance in these ads was highly publicized and considered a coup for the society, being the third time Seinfeld had appeared in a television commercial. The advertisements were filmed in Cedarhurst, Long Island, with the street designed to emulate Beaumont Street in Hamilton, where the Greater's head offices are located. Seinfeld also wrote the scripts for the 15 advertisements that were filmed. The ads largely aired in the Northern New South Wales television market, where the society has most of its branches. Seinfeld was the first guest on Jay Leno's talk show The Jay Leno Show, which premiered on September 14, 2009. Seinfeld was featured on Saturday Night Live's Weekend Update sketch to do the "Really!?!" segment with Seth Meyers. He executive produced and regularly appeared as a panelist in The Marriage Ref. In 2010, Seinfeld made a surprise guest appearance on The Howard Stern Show, ending the feud the two had in the early 1990s.

Seinfeld toured the U.S. in 2011 and made his first stand-up appearance in the United Kingdom in 11 years. That same year, he was a surprise guest on The Daily Show, helping Jon Stewart to suppress his urge to tell "cheap" "Michele Bachmann's husband acts gay" jokes. Seinfeld also launched a personal archives website at JerrySeinfeld.com, and appeared in the HBO special Talking Funny with fellow comedians Chris Rock, Louis C.K., and Ricky Gervais in the same year.

=== 2011–present: Talk show and expansion ===
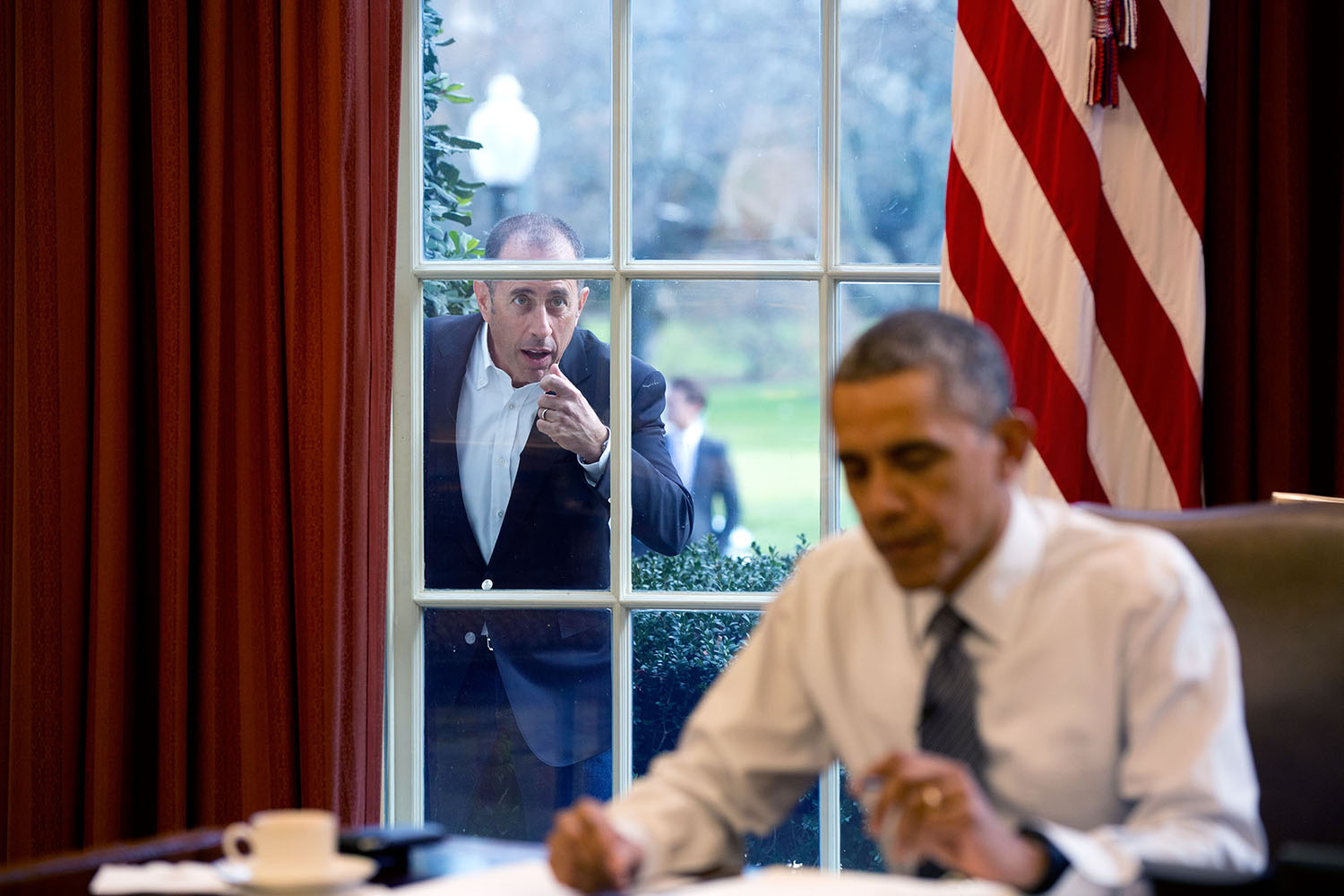
Seinfeld tapping on the Oval Office windows of the White House with President Barack Obama in 2015

In 2012, Seinfeld started a web series titled Comedians in Cars Getting Coffee, in which he would pick up a fellow comedian in a different car every episode and take them out for coffee and conversation. The show originally aired on the Crackle streaming service and then was bought by Netflix. The initial series consisted of ten episodes lasting from 7 to 25 minutes each. The show has continued to get high-profile guests such as Alec Baldwin, Mel Brooks, Bill Burr, Dave Chappelle, Louis C.K., Larry David, Ellen DeGeneres, Tina Fey, David Letterman, Jerry Lewis, Steve Martin, John Mulaney, Eddie Murphy, Carl Reiner, Don Rickles, Chris Rock, Howard Stern, and Jon Stewart. The show has also hosted Seinfeld alums Larry David, Julia Louis-Dreyfus, Jason Alexander, and Michael Richards. Season seven featured its most high-profile guest, then-President Barack Obama. In a farewell tribute video for the Obamas before the President left office, Seinfeld stated, "That knocking on the Oval Office window. That probably was the peak of my entire existence."

In 2014, Seinfeld told David Letterman he invited Woody Allen to be on the show but hadn't heard back. That same year he also revealed Joan Rivers was supposed to be a guest on the show before she died due to a botched medical procedure. Seinfeld signed a deal with Netflix in January 2017 that included placing Seinfeld and Comedians in Cars Getting Coffee on their streaming service as well as two new Seinfeld stand-up specials and the development of scripted and non-scripted comedy programming. As part of the deal, all episodes of Comedians in Cars Getting Coffee were made available on the streaming service, in addition to a new 24-episode season. The series was nominated for five Primetime Emmy Awards and won three Webby Awards.

It's very important to know what you don't like. A big part of innovation is saying, "You know what I'm really sick of?" For me, that was talk shows where music plays, somebody walks out to a desk, shakes hands with the host, and sits down. "How are you?" "You look great." I'm also sick of people who are really there to sell their show or product. "What am I really sick of?" is where innovation begins.

— Seinfeld, talking about his process of innovation.

In 2013, Seinfeld appeared on rapper Wale's album The Gifted, on the song "Outro About Nothing". Seinfeld received coverage for his speech at the 2014 Clio Awards ceremony, where he received an honorary award, as media reporters said that he "mocked" and "ripped apart" the advertising industry; his statement that "I love advertising because I love lying" received particular attention. In 2014, Seinfeld hosted the special Don Rickles: One Night Only at the Apollo Theatre. The event celebrated Don Rickles and his career, but also served as a roast among friends. Those who participated in the event included Jon Stewart, David Letterman, Tina Fey, Amy Poehler, Nathan Lane, Regis Philbin, Robert De Niro, and Martin Scorsese. In 2015, Seinfeld made a guest appearance on the Saturday Night Live 40th Anniversary Special, where he hosted the "Questions from the Audience" segment, which included cameos from Michael Douglas, John Goodman, James Franco, Larry David, Ellen Cleghorne, Dakota Johnson, Tim Meadows, Bob Odenkirk, and Sarah Palin (who Seinfeld initially mistook for Tina Fey). Seinfeld then made a guest appearance on David Letterman's final Late Show episode. Seinfeld joined guests including Alec Baldwin, Barbara Walters, Steve Martin, Jim Carrey, Chris Rock, Julia Louis-Dreyfus, Peyton Manning, Tina Fey, and Bill Murray who all participated in The Top Ten List segment, "Things I've Always Wanted to Say to Dave".

In 2017, Seinfeld went on The Tonight Show Starring Jimmy Fallon and joined Dave Chappelle and Jimmy Fallon in honoring outgoing First Lady Michelle Obama, and played a game of Catchphrase, which Obama and Fallon won to Seinfeld's dismay. On September 19, 2017, Netflix released the stand-up comedy special Jerry Before Seinfeld. It follows Seinfeld as he returns for a stand-up routine at the New York City comedy club, Comic Strip Live, which started his career. It is intercut with documentary clips and his stand-up special. It was later released as an LP, CD and download album, and was nominated for a 2018 Grammy Award for Best Comedy Album. In 2020, it was announced that Netflix would be releasing Seinfeld's first original stand-up special in 22 years, 23 Hours to Kill. The special premiered on May 5. In October 2020, Seinfeld joined Steve Martin in a discussion about comedy at The New Yorker Festival. They discussed subjects ranging from the creative process, Netflix, and The Oscars, to their comedy backgrounds, and the future of comedy during the COVID-19 pandemic.

In 2024 he directed, co-wrote, and produced in the Netflix comedy film Unfrosted, a satirical spoof about the creation of Pop-Tarts. Seinfeld also starred in the film alongside Melissa McCarthy, Jim Gaffigan, and Hugh Grant. The film earned mixed reviews with The Hollywood Reporter writing the film received a "sharply divided reaction from critics". The New York Times labeled it a "Critic's Pick" with Anne Nicholson describing it as a "full-fledged, fully ridiculous feature comedy targeted to the audience's sweet-and-salty dopamine receptors". David Ehrlich of IndieWire wrote that the "comedy never heats up" and "it's a movie about so many different things at once that it comes to feel like a movie about nothing". Seinfeld appeared as a guest on John Mulaney Presents: Everybody's in LA where he joked that it was "the weirdest talk show I've ever been on in my life". He also embarked on a new tour starting with his first show in Singapore in June 2024 followed by a number of stops in Australia and North America. Seinfeld returned to Curb Your Enthusiasm in its final season reuniting with Larry David where they poked fun at the controversial ending of Seinfeld. Ben Travers of IndieWire wrote, "If the Curb finale is meant to rewrite the Seinfeld ending in any way, it's during that first scene between Jerry and Larry. They're playing out the kind of scene they used to write for Jerry and George, and getting that silly, joyful spark between two TV legends – even for a moment – is pure bliss".

== Books ==
Seinfeld wrote the book SeinLanguage, released in 1993. Written as his television show was first rising in popularity, it is primarily an adaptation of his stand-up material. The title comes from an article in Entertainment Weekly listing the numerous catchphrases for which the show was responsible. In 2002, he wrote the children's book Halloween. The book was illustrated by James Bennett. Seinfeld wrote the forewords to Ted L. Nancy's Letters from a Nut series of books and Ed Broth's Stories from a Moron. Seinfeld also wrote the foreword to the Peanut Butter & Co. Cookbook. In October 2020, Seinfeld released his new book Is This Anything?. The book chronicles Seinfeld's 45 years working in comedy and contains many of his best bits that span from various decades. In February 2022, Seinfeld contributed original poetry to Eating Salad Drunk, a comedian poetry anthology (edited by author Gabe Henry) that benefited Comedy Gives Back, a nonprofit supporting comedians in financial hardship.

== Influences ==
Seinfeld has stated, "On the Mount Rushmore of stand-up comedy, there are four faces, in my opinion: Richard Pryor, George Carlin, Bill Cosby, and Don Rickles." Seinfeld has also cited as his influences Jean Shepherd, Mad Magazine, Jonathan Winters, Jerry Lewis, Robert Klein, and Abbott and Costello. He stated, "Monty Python was a gigantic influence on me. They were just about silly, funny things that meant nothing, and that's the stuff I love. There's a wonderful childlike freedom in those kinds of things."

In the Netflix comedy special, Jerry Before Seinfeld, he displayed his personal comedy albums collection from when he was a teenager. These albums included:

- Lenny Bruce – Thank You Masked Man (1972)
- George Carlin – Class Clown (1972)
- Steve Martin – Let's Get Small (1977)
- Bob Newhart – The Button-Down Mind of Bob Newhart (1960)
- Mike Nichols and Elaine May – Improvisations to Music (1958)
- Mel Brooks and Carl Reiner – 2000 and One Years with Carl Reiner and Mel Brooks (1961)

In an interview with Entertainment Weekly, Seinfeld stated his five favorite films are The Heartbreak Kid (1972), The Graduate (1967), The In-Laws (1979), A Night at the Opera (1935), and Glengarry Glen Ross (1992).

Those influenced by Seinfeld include John Mulaney, Ellen DeGeneres, Jim Gaffigan, Judd Apatow, Issa Rae, Nate Bargatze, and Mark Normand. On The Late Show with Stephen Colbert, Steve Martin described Seinfeld as one of his "retro heroes" saying "[He's] a guy who came up behind me and is better than I am. I think he's fantastic, I love to listen to him, he almost puts me at peace. I love to listen to him talk".

== Personal life ==
Seinfeld is a fan of the New York Mets and periodically calls Steve Somers' show on WFAN-AM, a sports radio station, as "Jerry from Queens". Seinfeld called four innings of a Mets game on SNY on June 23, 2010, reuniting with analyst Keith Hernandez, who appeared in the Seinfeld two-part episode entitled "The Boyfriend". According to Seinfeld, he thinks about baseball "all day" and has said "when I think of retirement, all I would think of is going to a baseball game every day."

Seinfeld is a fan of comic book characters, particularly Superman. In 2022, he appeared on a variant cover of Batman/Superman: World's Finest with the title characters.

Seinfeld is left-handed, and the first joke he wrote professionally was about the topic. In a 2014 interview with NBC News, he made statements suggesting that he believed he was on the autism spectrum. However, following criticism for his alleged self-diagnosis, he later clarified that he is not autistic and had been commenting on a play about the condition that he "related to [...] on some level".

=== Relationships and marriage ===
Years before Seinfeld was created, Seinfeld dated Carol Leifer. She was a fellow comedian, and one of the inspirations for the Seinfeld character Elaine Benes. On national television with sex therapist and talk show host Dr. Ruth Westheimer, he mentioned that he was engaged in 1984 but called it off.

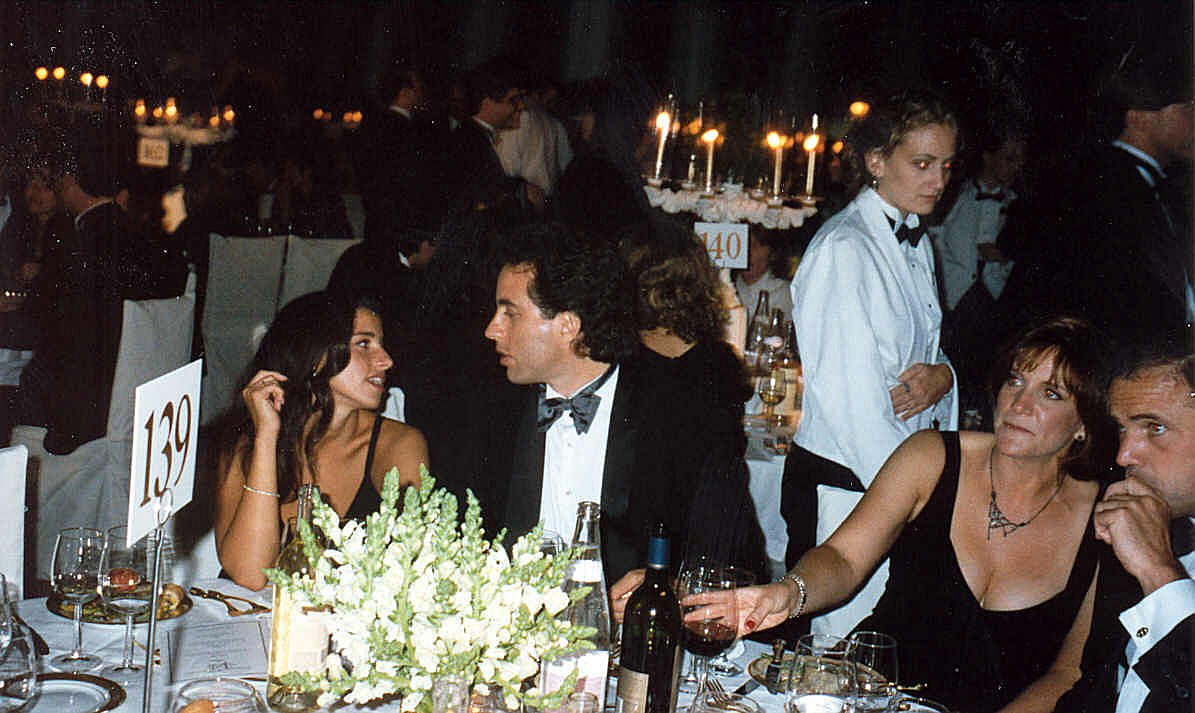
Seinfeld with Lonstein (left) at the 47th Primetime Emmy Awards in 1995

In May 1993, then 39-year-old Seinfeld met Shoshanna Lonstein in Central Park and asked for her phone number. At the time, Lonstein was a 17-year-old senior year high school student, at Nightingale-Bamford School in Manhattan, later celebrating her 18th birthday on May 29. As Seinfeld described their relationship during this time on The Howard Stern Show: "I didn't realize she was so young. This is the only girl I ever went out with who was that young. I wasn't dating her. We just went to a restaurant, and that was it." After several months of correspondence, Seinfeld and Lonstein began a relationship in September 1993, while Lonstein was attending George Washington University. Seinfeld and Lonstein dated for approximately four years, until 1997. She transferred from George Washington to UCLA, in part to be with him, ultimately citing constant press coverage and missing New York City as reasons for the relationship ending.

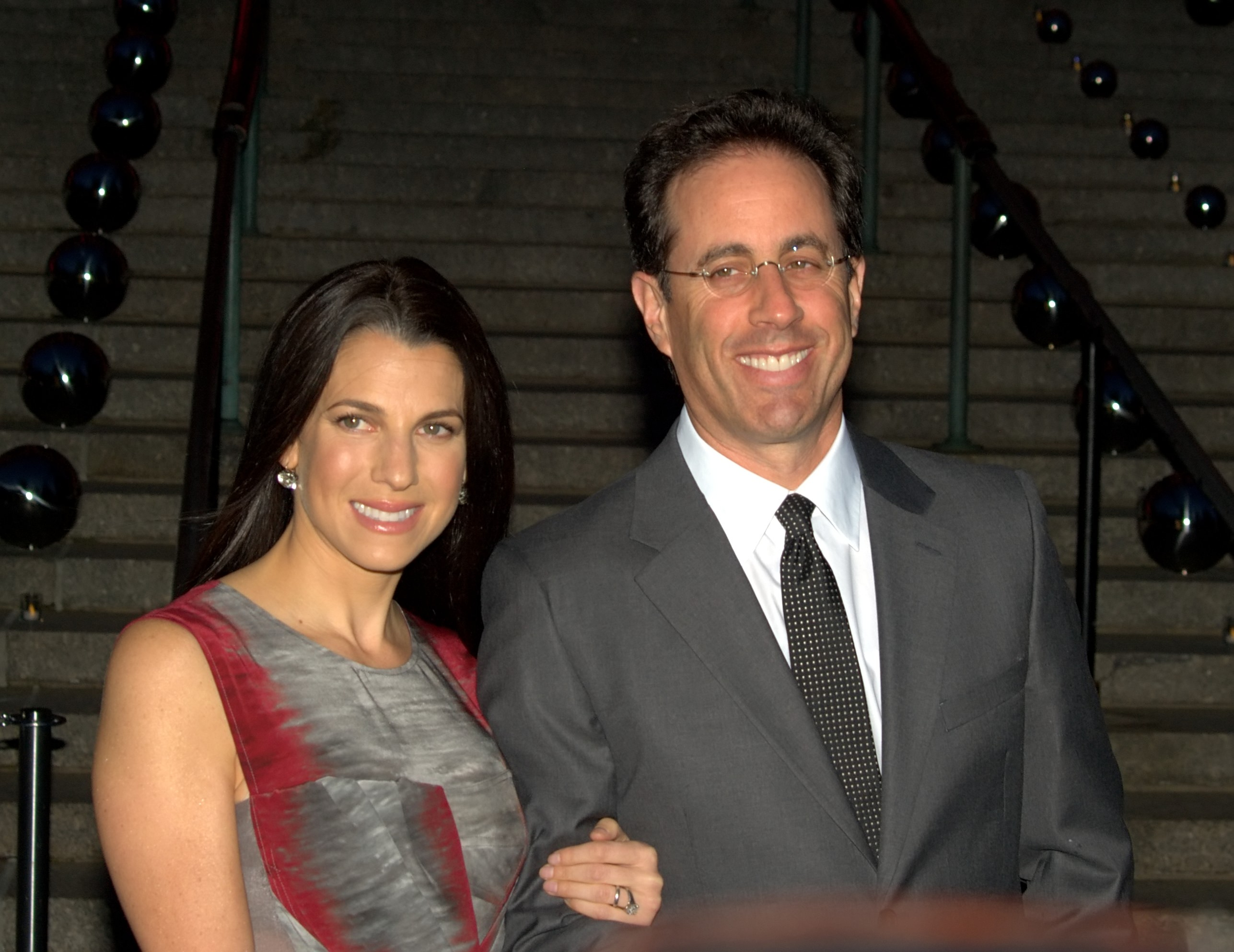
Jessica and Jerry Seinfeld in 2010

In August 1998, while at a Reebok Sports Club, Seinfeld met Jessica Sklar, a public relations executive for Tommy Hilfiger who had just returned from a three-week honeymoon in Italy with then-husband Eric Nederlander, a theatrical producer and scion of a theater-owning family. Unaware of Sklar's marital status, Seinfeld invited her out. When Sklar eventually told Seinfeld about her relationship situation, she said, "I told him I didn't think this was the right time for me to be involved with anybody." Two months later, Sklar filed for divorce and began dating Seinfeld. The pair married on December 25, 1999. Comedian George Wallace was the best man at the wedding. After the nuptials, Jerry and Jessica Seinfeld bought Billy Joel's house in Amagansett, New York, for US$32 million after news of the couple's interest in the property became public in 2000. The Seinfelds have a daughter and two sons.

=== Wealth and charity ===
In 1999, Seinfeld auctioned a Breitling Chronomat watch as part of the "Famous Faces, Watch Auction For Charity" event in New York City. This watch sold for $11,000. In 2001, Jerry and Jessica Seinfeld created the charitable organization Good+Foundation after their first child was born. Good+Foundation grants donations of products and services to programs that have demonstrated a capacity to address family poverty in three focus areas: supporting new mothers, investing in early childhood, and engaging fathers. GOOD+ Foundation has donated over $42M worth of items through its partner network across the United States. Seinfeld has also participated in Jon Stewart's charity event, Night of Too Many Stars.

According to Forbes magazine, Seinfeld's cumulative earnings from Seinfeld as of 2004 $267 million, placing him at the top of the celebrity earnings list that year. He turned down $5 million per episode, for 22 episodes, to continue the show for a 10th season. Seinfeld earned $100 million from syndication deals and stand-up performances in 2004, and $60 million in 2006. He also earned $10 million for appearing with Bill Gates in Microsoft's 2008 advertisements for Windows. Between June 2008 and June 2009, Seinfeld earned $85 million, making him the world's highest-paid comedian during those 12 months. In 2013, Forbes documented Seinfeld's annual income as $32 million. In mid-2013, Seinfeld disputed Forbes's claims regarding his income and net worth on The Howard Stern Show. Seinfeld was ranked by Forbes the highest-paid comedian for 2015, the second-highest-paid in 2016, and the highest-paid again in 2017. Seinfeld's income between June 2016 and June 2017 was $69 million.

In 2024, Bloomberg declared Seinfeld a billionaire, with a net worth standing at more than US$1 billion, thanks to various syndication deals his sitcom signed, with $465 million coming from those deals, making him one of the richest celebrities.

=== Automobiles ===
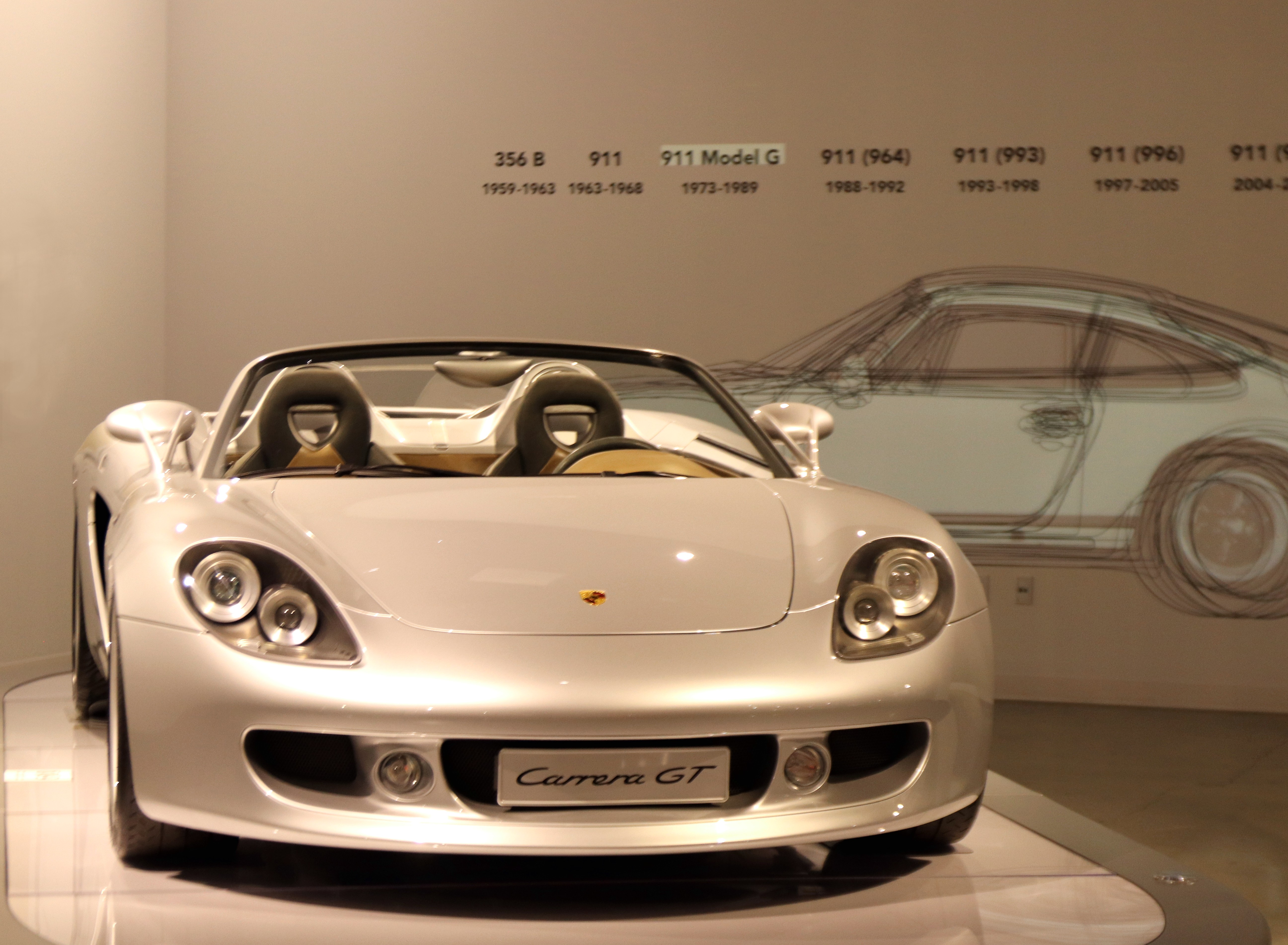
Seinfeld's most common car acquisitions involve Porsches.

Seinfeld is an automobile enthusiast and collector, and he owns a collection of about 150 cars, including many Porsches. He rented a hangar at Santa Monica Airport in Santa Monica, California, in the 1990s to store cars. In 2002, Seinfeld purchased property on the Upper West Side of Manhattan in New York City where he built a $1.4 million two-story garage to store Porsches. One tally has Seinfeld owning 43 Porsches. Paul Bannister has written that Seinfeld's collection includes Porsche 911s from various years, 10 Porsche Boxsters each painted a different color, and the 1955 Porsche 550 Spyder, the same model and pearl-grey color of the car James Dean was driving in his fatal crash.

The centerpiece of the Seinfeld collection is Steve McQueen's Porsche 917 Chassis 022, driven extensively in the 1971 film Le Mans, acquired by Seinfeld in 2002, and restored by Joe Cavaglieri to the 1971-era Gulf Porsche team livery.

The Discovery Channel television show Chasing Classic Cars claimed that Seinfeld owns the first and last produced air-cooled Porsche 911s. He has a $700,000 Porsche 959, one of only 337 built. He was originally not allowed to drive it, because the car was "not street legal." U.S. emissions and crash tests had not been performed for the model because Porsche refused to donate four Porsche 959s for destruction tests. Seinfeld imported the car "for exhibition purposes," on the stipulation that it may never be driven on U.S. roads. The car was made U.S. street legal in 1999 under the "Show or Display" federal law. Seinfeld wrote an article for the February 2004 issue of Automobile, reviewing the Porsche Carrera GT.

In 2008, Seinfeld was involved in a car accident when the brakes on his 1967 Fiat 500 failed and, to avoid an intersection, he pulled the emergency brake while turning sharply, ultimately causing the car to flip onto its side. No one was hurt.

=== Coffee machines ===
A coffee aficionado, Seinfeld owns multiple espresso machines, including the $17,000 Elektra Belle Epoque and two machines manufactured by Slayer and Breville. Seinfeld described his single-group Slayer machine, which costs upwards of $8,500, as a "beautiful machine." When NPR asked him about the influence of coffee culture in the U.S., Seinfeld responded in 2013:

I never liked [coffee] and I didn't understand it and I used to do a lot of stuff in my stand-up set in the '80s and '90s about how I don't 'get' coffee. And then something happened about five years ago. I started touring a lot, and we would have these great big, fun breakfasts in the hotel and [coffee] just seemed to go really well [with breakfast]. [Now], I've just started this espresso thing.

In a May 2024 GQ interview titled "10 Things Jerry Seinfeld Can't Live Without", Seinfeld revealed that a Bialetti moka pot is one of his must-haves. He described the process of making coffee with a moka pot as complex and time-consuming, but a pleasurable way to "waste time".

=== Religion and politics ===
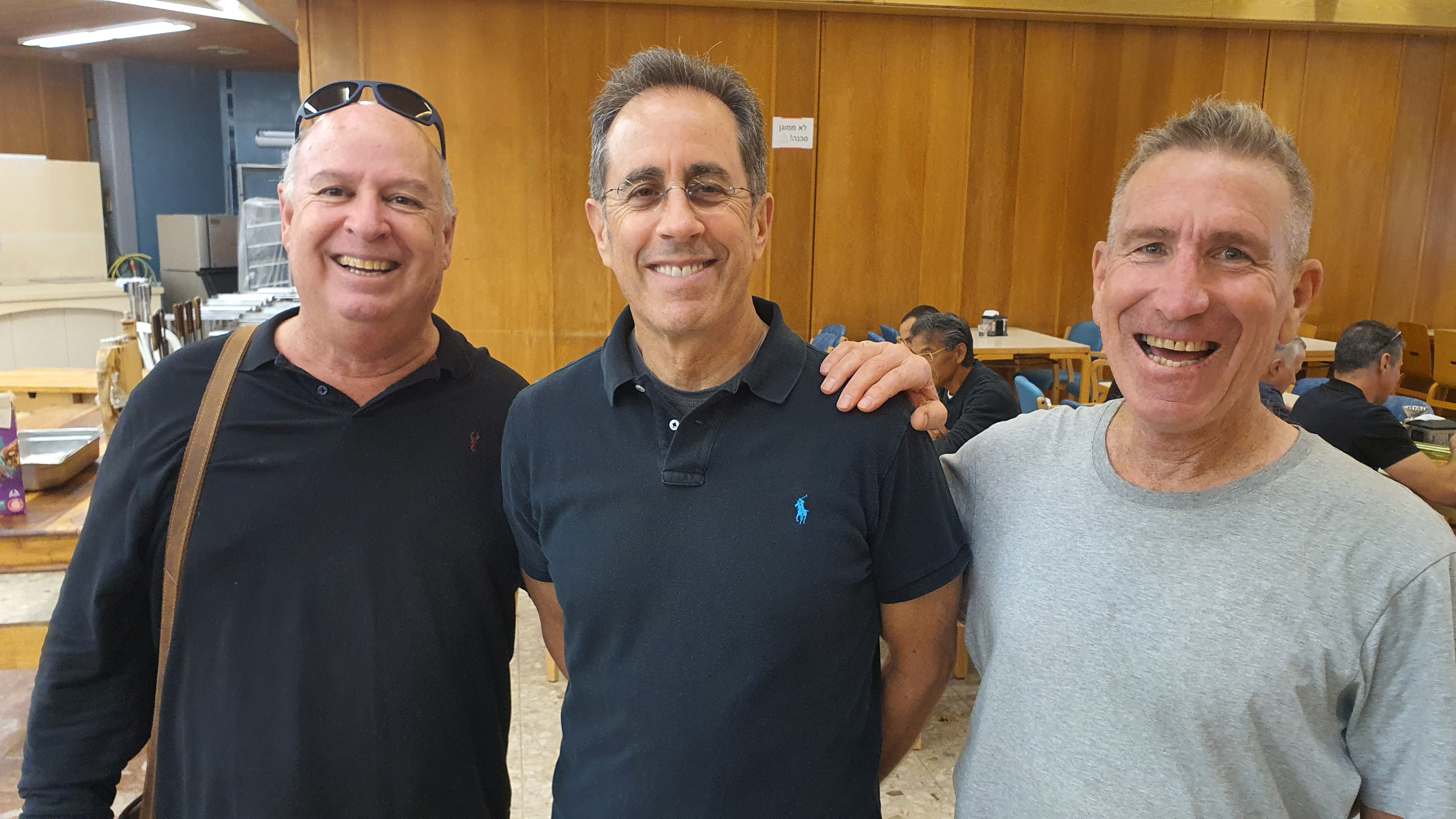
Seinfeld with members of Kibbutz Be'eri in the kibbutz dining room, December 19, 2023

Seinfeld is Jewish and has incorporated elements of his Jewish identity in his work. Although he shared that his mother was born into a large family of Syrian Orthodox Jews, he admitted to being non-religious himself. Seinfeld stated that he took a Scientology course when he was in his 20s; he said that he found it interesting but that he did not pursue it any further.

Seinfeld expressed support for Israel during the Gaza war, saying "I will always stand with Israel and the Jewish people." In December 2023, Seinfeld traveled to Israel with his family, where he met with freed hostages and representatives of hostage families at the Hostages and Missing Persons Families Forum headquarters in Tel Aviv. The forum said he had expressed a commitment to raising international awareness of the hostages. He described his trip to Israel as "the most powerful experience" in his life. On May 12, 2024, Seinfeld gave a commencement address and received an honorary degree at Duke University. During his speech, a number of students booed, waved Palestinian flags and walked out in protest. In June 2024, Seinfeld was heckled by protesters during a comedy show in Sydney, Australia. Seinfeld responded by joking, "You're really influencing everyone here. We're all on your side now, because you've made your point so well, and in the right venue, you've come to the right place for a political conversation". A similar incident occurred at a later show in Melbourne, where he told a pro-Palestinian heckler that "You need to go back and tell whoever is running your organisation (that) 'we just gave more money to a Jew.'" In February 2025, Seinfeld was approached outside an event by an influencer who asked for a selfie and then — instead of a photo — held up a peace sign and said "Free Palestine." When asked to repeat the phrase, Seinfeld shook his head and replied: "I don't care about Palestine."

On September 9, 2025, speaking at Duke University at an event with Omer Shem Tov, Seinfeld characterized the "Free Palestine" movement as antisemitic and compared it to the Ku Klux Klan, saying "Free Palestine is, to me, just — you're free to say you don't like Jews. Just say you don't like Jews." He added, "By saying Free Palestine, you're not admitting what you really think. So it's actually — compared to the Ku Klux Klan, I'm actually thinking the Klan is actually a little better here because they can come right out and say, 'We don't like Blacks, we don't like Jews.' Okay that's honest." In June 2026, after an influencer asked Seinfeld to say "free Palestine" outside Madison Square Garden following an NBA Finals game, Seinfeld replied "it doesn't exist." On October 9, 2026, during a stand-up performance at the Chicago Theatre, Seinfeld's set was interrupted by pro-Palestinian protesters who accused him of being and a "genocide apologist" over his support for Israel which they called a "racist state." Seinfeld sarcastically replied, "I am a racist. It's a genocide. I'm into it." He then followed up, adding "I'm gonna find out how much your ticket was and I'm sending it to Israel... No I won't, I'm keeping it."

Seinfeld has expressed his distaste for what he calls political correctness. In 2015, Seinfeld stated that he avoids performing on college campuses because students have become too easily offended by his comedic routines. In a 2024 interview with The New Yorker, Seinfeld claimed political correctness was destroying comedy, saying: "It used to be, you would go home at the end of the day, most people would go, 'Oh, Cheers is on. Oh, M*A*S*H is on. Oh, Mary Tyler Moore is on. All in the Family is on.' You just expected, There'll be some funny stuff we can watch on TV tonight. Well, guess what—where is it? This is the result of the extreme left and PC crap, and people worrying so much about offending other people. Now they're going to see stand-up comics because we are not policed by anyone. The audience polices us. We know when we’re off track. We know instantly and we adjust to it instantly. But when you write a script and it goes into four or five different hands, committees, groups – 'Here's our thought about this joke.' – Well, that's the end of your comedy." In that same interview, when asked if there was ever an episode of Seinfeld that "went too far", he pointed to the episode The Bookstore: "We would write a different joke with Kramer and the rickshaw today. We wouldn't do that joke. We'd come up with another joke. They [the culture] move the gates like in the slalom...the gates are moving. Your job [as a comedian] is to be agile and clever enough that, wherever they put the gates, I'm going to make the gate." Months later, he walked back those comments on the Breaking Bread podcast, claiming he mispoke: He stated: "...I did an interview with The New Yorker. And I said that the extreme left has suppressed the art of comedy. I did say that. That's not true... If you're Lindsey Vonn, if you're a champion skier, you can put the gates anywhere you want on the mountain. She's going to make the gate. That's comedy. Whatever the culture is, we make the gate. You don't make the gate you're out of the game... So, I don't think, as I said, the extreme left has done anything to inhibit the art of comedy. I'm taking that back now officially. They have not. Do you like it? Maybe? Maybe, not? It's not my business to like or not like where the culture is at. It's my business to make the gate..."

=== Transcendental Meditation ===
In December 2012, Seinfeld said that he had been practicing Transcendental Meditation for 40 years. He promoted the use of the Transcendental Meditation technique in the treatment of post-traumatic stress disorder with Bob Roth of the David Lynch Foundation in December 2012 on Good Morning America, and also appeared at a 2009 David Lynch Foundation benefit for TM, at which Paul McCartney and Ringo Starr appeared. On November 5, 2015, the David Lynch Foundation organized a benefit concert at New York City's Carnegie Hall called "Change Begins Within" to promote transcendental meditation for stress control. "It's been the greatest companion technique of living that I've ever come across, and I'm thrilled to be part of this movement that seems to have really been reinvigorated by Bob [Roth] and David Lynch," Seinfeld said. "I would do anything that I could to promote it in the world, because I think it's the greatest thing as a life tool, as a work tool and just making things make sense."

== Filmography ==
=== Film ===
Year	Title	Role	Notes
1996	Eddie	Himself	Cameo
1996	Good Money	Himself	Cameo
1999	Pros & Cons	Prison Man #2	Cameo
2002	Comedian	Himself	Documentary, also executive producer
2005	The Thing About My Folks	Himself	Cameo
2007	Bee Movie	Barry B. Benson	Voice, also co-writer and producer
2013	Quality Balls: The David Steinberg Story	Himself	Documentary
2014	Top Five	Himself	Uncredited cameo
2014	Tom's Restaurant – A Documentary About Everything	Himself	Documentary
2016	Robert Klein Still Can't Stop His Leg	Himself	Documentary
2016	Dying Laughing	Himself	Documentary
2017	If You're Not in the Obit, Eat Breakfast	Himself	Documentary
2022	George Carlin's American Dream	Himself	Documentary
2024	Unfrosted	Bob Cabana	Also director, co-writer and producer
2025	Being Eddie	Himself	Documentary

=== Television ===
Year	Title	Role	Notes
1980	Benson	Frankie	3 episodes
1981	An Evening at the Improv	Himself	Season 1, Episode 3
1982	Square Pegs	Bat Mitzvah Guest	Episode: "Muffy's Bat Mitzvah"
1982	An Evening at the Improv	Himself	Stand-up special
1984	The Ratings Game	Network Rep	Television film
1986	Rodney Dangerfield: It's Not Easy Bein' Me	Himself	Stand-up special. Released on DVD in 2006.
1989–1998	Seinfeld	Jerry Seinfeld	180 episodes; also co-creator, writer and executive producer
1992	Carol Leifer: Gaudy, Bawdy & Blue	Himself	Television film
1992, 1999	Saturday Night Live	Himself (host)	2 episodes
1993	Politically Incorrect with Bill Maher	Panel Guest	First episode
1993	Love & War	Himself	Episode: "Let's Not Call it Love"
1993–1998	The Larry Sanders Show	Himself	2 episodes
1994	Abbott and Costello Meet Jerry Seinfeld	Host	TV special; released on VHS, DVD and Blu-ray
1997	NewsRadio	Himself	Episode: "The Real Deal"
1998	Mad About You	Himself	Uncredited; Episode: "Season Opener"
1999	Larry David: Curb Your Enthusiasm	Himself	Television special
2000	Dilbert	Comp-U-Comp	Voice; Episode: "The Return"
2004–2024	Curb Your Enthusiasm	Himself	7 episodes
2007	30 Rock	Himself	Episode: "SeinfeldVision"
2010–2011	The Marriage Ref	Himself	9 episodes; also creator and executive producer
2011	Talking Funny	Himself	Television special, HBO
2012–2014	Louie	Himself	2 episodes
2012–2019	Comedians in Cars Getting Coffee	Himself (host)	72 episodes; also creator and executive producer
2014	Don Rickles: One Night Only	Himself (host)	Television special
2015	Saturday Night Live 40th Anniversary Special	Himself	Television special
2015	Inside Amy Schumer	Himself	Episode: "80s Ladies"
2016	The Jim Gaffigan Show	Himself	Episode: "The Calling"
2016	Maya & Marty	Himself	Episode #1.5
2017	Mystery Science Theater 3000	Freak Masterstroke	Episode: "Starcrash"
2018	My Next Guest Needs No Introduction	Himself (host)	Episode: "You're David Letterman, You Idiot"
2019	Huge in France	Himself	Episode: "Épisode Quatre"
2024	Quiet on Set: The Dark Side of Kids TV	Himself	Episode 3, Archive footage
2024	John Mulaney Presents: Everybody's in LA	Himself	Episode: "Coyotes"
2026	Life, Larry and the Pursuit of Unhappiness	William Clark	Episode: "Farewell"

=== Music videos ===
Year	Title	Artist	Director	Ref.
2019	"Sunflower"	Vampire Weekend	Jonah Hill	

=== Video games ===
Year	Title	Role	Publisher	Ref.
2007	Bee Movie Game	Barry B. Benson (voice)	Activision	

=== Directing ===
Year	Title	Studio
2011	Colin Quinn: Long Story Short	HBO
2016	Colin Quinn: The New York Story	Netflix
2024	Unfrosted	Netflix

=== Writing credits for Seinfeld ===
The list below only includes episodes mainly written by Seinfeld, as he (and Larry David in Seasons 1 through 7) rewrote the drafts for each episode.

Season	Episode	Notes
Season 1	"The Seinfeld Chronicles"	with Larry David
Season 1	"Male Unbonding"	with Larry David
Season 1	"The Stake Out"	with Larry David
Season 1	"The Stock Tip"	with Larry David
Season 2	"The Ex-Girlfriend"	with Larry David
Season 2	"The Pony Remark"	with Larry David
Season 2	"The Busboy"	with Larry David
Season 2	"The Jacket"	with Larry David
Season 2	"The Chinese Restaurant"	with Larry David
Season 2	"The Phone Message"	with Larry David
Season 3	"The Stranded"	with Larry David and Matt Goldman
Season 4	"The Shoes"	with Larry David
Season 5	"The Sniffing Accountant"	with Larry David
Season 5	"The Raincoats"	with Larry David, Tom Gammill, and Max Pross
Season 5	"The Opposite"	with Larry David and Andy Cowan
Season 6	"The Kiss Hello"	with Larry David
Season 7	"The Cadillac"	with Larry David

== Comedy releases ==
=== Stand-up specials ===
Year	Title	Studio	Format	Ref.
1987	Stand-Up Confidential	HBO	Broadcast/VHS	
1998	I'm Telling You for the Last Time	HBO	Broadcast/streaming/VHS/DVD	
2017	Jerry Before Seinfeld	Netflix	Streaming	
2020	23 Hours to Kill	Netflix	Streaming	

=== Stand-up appearances ===
Year	Title	Studio	Format
2001	"Laughing Out Loud: America's Funniest Comedians"	Madacy Entertainment	VHS/DVD
2003	"Best of The Improv, Vol. 4"	Koch Vision	DVD
2007	"Comedy Club Greats"	Lionsgate	DVD
2010	"Lafflink Presents: The Platinum Comedy Series Vol. 1: Jerry Seinfeld"	Lafflink	DVD/streaming
2014	"Classic Comedy from An Evening at the Improv"	Somerville House	DVD/streaming
2015	"The Tonight Show Starring Johnny Carson: Featuring Jerry Seinfeld"	Carson Entertainment	DVD/streaming

== Awards and nominations ==
Over his career he has received numerous accolades including a Primetime Emmy Award, a Golden Globe Award, and three Actor Awards as well as nominations for four Grammy Awards. Seinfeld has received an Honorary Doctorate of Humane Letters from Queens College (1994) as well as an Honorary Doctor of Arts from Duke University (2024)

== Discography ==
- I'm Telling You for the Last Time (Universal Records, 1998) CD/cassette
- Jerry Before Seinfeld (Netflix, 2017) LP
- 23 Hours to Kill (Netflix, 2020) LP

== Bibliography ==
- SeinLanguage (Bantam Books, 1993)
- Halloween (Little, Brown and Company, 2002)
- Is This Anything? (Simon & Schuster, 2020)
