= Jerry Before Seinfeld =

- Poster
- Written by: Jerry Seinfeld
- Directed by: Michael Bonfiglio
- Starring: Jerry Seinfeld
- Music by: Paul Little
- Country of origin: United States
- Original language: English

Production
- Producers: Tammy Johnston; Judd Apatow
- Cinematography: Jay Feather; Sam Levy
- Editors: Yossi Kimberg; Paul Little
- Running time: 61 minutes
- Production companies: Columbus 81 Productions; Embassy Row

Original release
- Network: Netflix
- Release: September 19, 2017

Jerry Before Seinfeld is a 2017 stand-up comedy film that follows comedian Jerry Seinfeld as he returns for a stand-up routine at the New York City comedy club, Comic Strip Live, which started his career. The album of the special was nominated for a 2018 Grammy Award for Best Comedy Album. This is his third special and his first with Netflix.

== Influences ==
In the Netflix comedy special, Jerry Before Seinfeld, Jerry displayed his personal comedy album collection from when he was a teenager. These albums include:

- Lenny Bruce – Thank You Masked Man (1972)
- Bill Cosby – I Started Out as a Child (1961)
- George Carlin – Class Clown (1972)
- Steve Martin – Let's Get Small (1977)
- Bob Newhart – The Button-Down Mind of Bob Newhart (1960)
- Mike Nichols and Elaine May – Improvisations to Music (1958)
- Mel Brooks and Carl Reiner – 2000 and One Years with Carl Reiner and Mel Brooks (1961)

There is also a brief montage of comedians whom Seinfeld admired: Bruce, Richard Pryor, and Jonathan Winters. Seinfeld also talks about the influence Mad Magazine had on him.

== Reception ==
On Rotten Tomatoes, the film holds an approval rating of 95% based on 19 reviews, with an average rating of 7.35/10. The site's critical consensus reads, "Jerry Before Seinfeld finds its star revisiting his earliest material on his hometown stage, offering appropriately familiar – yet still abundant – laughs along the way."

== Formats ==
In addition to streaming, the audio was released as a double-vinyl record on September 29, 2017.
