= John Oldfield =

John Oldfield may refer to:

- John Oldfield (British Army officer) (1789–1863), English army officer
- John Oldfield (footballer) (1943–2002), English footballer
- John Oldfield (engineer) (1937–2002), British engineer and Ford executive
- John William Oldfield (1886–1955), figure in the commercial and public life in Ceylon
- John Frank Oldfield, American law enforcement pioneer in undercover investigations

== See also ==
- Jack Oldfield (John Richard Anthony Oldfield, 1899–1999), British politician
- Ted Oldfield (John Edward Oldfield, 1918–2006), English footballer
