= The Wallet =

- Seinfeld episode
- Episode no.: Season 4 Episode 5
- Directed by: Tom Cherones
- Written by: Larry David
- Production code: 405
- Original air date: September 23, 1992

Guest appearance
- Stephen McHattie as Dr. Reston

Episode chronology
| ← Previous "The Ticket" | Next → "The Watch" |
- Seinfeld season 4

"The Wallet" is the 45th episode of the NBC sitcom Seinfeld. It is the fifth episode of the fourth season of the series, and first aired on September 23, 1992. In this episode, Morty loses his wallet while visiting to see a back doctor, Jerry makes up a flimsy excuse for the watch his parents gave him being missing, George holds out for a better offer from NBC, and Elaine cannot break up with a manipulative psychiatrist.

== Plot ==
Jerry's parents Morty and Helen Seinfeld are visiting to see a doctor for Morty's back pain, which developed after he slept in their own sofa bed. Jerry assures his parents that he and George are accepting the pilot order that NBC offered. Meanwhile, George, out with Susan, flatly turns down the offer as a bluff.

Morty and Helen notice that Jerry's watch is missing, but, unable to admit that he threw away their gift, Jerry pretends that the watch is out for repair all week. At Jerry's apartment, Morty is pleased with his new pants, while Kramer worries Helen about "Crazy" Joe Davola coming after Jerry. Kramer, knowing that the watch repair should not take so long, forces Jerry to name the supposed repair shop, and nearly blows his cover.

At the clinic, Morty is reluctant to part with his pants for an X-ray, and cannot find his wallet after returning. He accuses the doctor of swindling him, and refuses his diagnosis.

Jerry is appalled at George holding out for a better offer, since they have nothing of merit over any other contenders, but George pompously mocks Jerry. George offers up a box of Cuban cigars from Susan's father, and Kramer indiscriminately accepts. He sets his own hair on fire while lighting a cigar over Jerry's stove range.

Everyone exuberantly welcomes Elaine back from her trip, but Elaine unwittingly telegraphs her struggle to break up with Dr. Reston—who is abusing his influence as her psychiatrist to manipulate her decisions. George suggests that she invent a fake lover as an excuse; unable to lie convincingly to Reston, Elaine, after much hemming and hawing, names Kramer as her new boyfriend. Reston does not yield, and pressures her to have Kramer call him.

Uncle Leo, who recommended the doctor, berates Morty at a dinner out. When Morty and Helen recognize his watch as the same as Jerry's, he reveals that he fished it out of the trash and then had it repaired at the very shop that Jerry named earlier. Jerry, realizing this was his own watch, desperately tries to distract everyone.

"The Wallet" is part 1 of a two-part story which concludes in "The Watch".

== Production ==
This was the first episode in the fourth season to include Elaine in a major role, with Julia Louis-Dreyfus returning to full screentime after taking maternity leave.

== Series continuity ==
The wallet was later revealed to be in Jerry's couch in "The Pilot, Part 2".

The box of cigars given to George by Susan's father, which George in turn gives to Kramer, is the same box of cigars that burns down the cabin in "The Bubble Boy". The story of the cigars continues on and is a central part of the story in "The Cheever Letters".
