= Nightmare Cafe =

1992 American television series

- Created by: Wes Craven; Thomas Baum
- Starring: Robert Englund; Jack Coleman; Lindsay Frost
- Country of origin: United States
- No. of seasons: 1
- No. of episodes: 6

Production
- Running time: 1 hour, with commercials
- Production companies: Wes Craven Films; MGM/UA Television

Original release
- Network: NBC
- Release: January 29 – April 3, 1992

Nightmare Cafe is an American science-fiction television series that aired on NBC for six episodes from January to April 1992. While the overall tone of the program was that of a mystical fantasy, it frequently incorporated elements of dark humor, horror, and even outright comedy. The show was canceled during its first season due to low ratings.

The series has subsequently been shown on the Sci Fi Channel as part of their Series Collection. The series began showing on NBC Universal's horror and suspense-themed cable channel, Chiller in March 2009.

== Overview ==
Nightmare Cafe broadly concerns the inhabitants of the titular otherworldly café: mysterious proprietor Blackie, sarcastic but good-hearted cook Frank, and insecure yet gutsy waitress Fay. During the show's limited run, the origins of the café were never revealed, but it has the power to materialize in any location, and seems to be sentient on some level (in one episode, it refuses to allow Frank to enter until he apologizes to it). The café is usually situated by a waterfront; when it changes its location, its inhabitants realize that they are about to be given a mission.

=== Themes ===
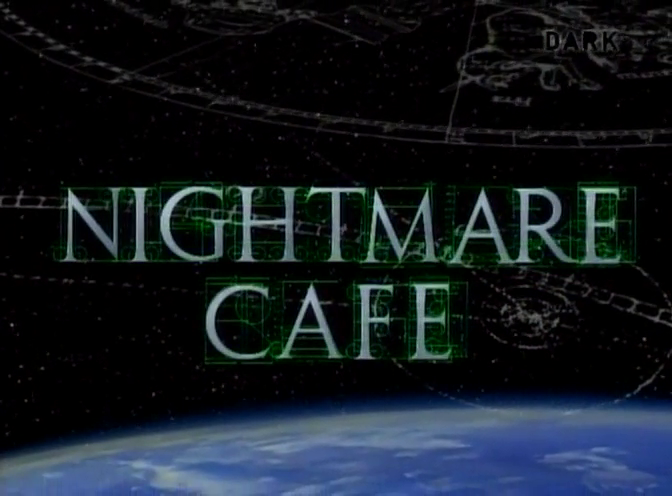
Opening title of the series

Nightmare Cafe is a show about second chances. Characters who enter the café—presumably drawn there by the café itself, as an embodiment of fate—are given the opportunity to correct something in their lives that went wrong if they are morally good; or if they are morally bad, to atone for something they have done or will do, sometimes against their will, and often incorporating poetic justice.

=== The café ===
The café serves as both a central location for the action and as a plot catalyst, primarily by exerting its influence upon each episode's protagonist(s), or antagonist(s), to bring them into contact with the regulars. Aside from transporting itself from place to place in its entirety, once settled, it can also create portals between itself and various locations, which are traversed (often unexpectedly, on the whim of the café) by crossing the threshold of one of the café's many doorways. These portals are not restricted to the Earth; the café can also travel to outer space and, apparently, even heaven. The café also has the ability to make both idle and heartfelt wishes come true, which of course are not always what the recipient actually wants or needs, and the café seems to take a perverse delight in "misinterpreting" such wishes. Frank and Fay often take advantage of this ability by wishing themselves from place to place; when this occurs, or when the café otherwise deems it important, those remaining in the dining room can watch the exploits of their companions on the (sometimes interactive) television set mounted in the far wall.

== Cast ==
- Robert Englund as Blackie
- Jack Coleman as Frank Nolan
- Lindsay Frost as Fay Peronivic

== Origins ==
Creator Wes Craven's original concept for the series involved standalone episodes akin to The Twilight Zone or Amazing Stories, but with regular characters bookending the tales ("like Twilight Zone meets Cheers", as Craven often said in interviews). NBC gave Craven the green light, but when he prepared to write the pilot, he realized that he wanted the regular characters to also be the main characters. Despite the show being retooled before the pilot was even written, contemporary critics still often referred to Nightmare Cafe as a "supernatural/horror anthology" series.

The series itself was filmed in Vancouver, British Columbia, with the city waterfront doubling for the waterfront that served as the café's "home base". Although the production team originally toyed with the idea of filming in a real diner, that idea was eventually scrapped, and a set was built in Vancouver's North Shore Studios. The set was built to be mobile, as certain scripts called for parts of the cafe interior to appear in completely different locations; it was also built with a ceiling, unusual for television at the time, and each booth was given an authentic 1940s' era table jukebox, rented from a private collector.

The pilot episode of Nightmare Cafe was first "officially" aired on February 28, 1992, at 10 pm EST. However, NBC decided to lead off its new season of shows with a special "sneak preview" night, in which one of its new programs would be unveiled early, in order to generate advance buzz and get a jump on the season. That "secret" episode was the pilot of Nightmare Cafe, although in actuality it wasn't much of a surprise, since many TV writers had already disclosed which program was to be shown.

Later Craven said: "That was our first try at episodic television and I wasn’t really there when it was being made–that was a factor of me being on Shocker at the time. But what we learned was, if you’re not there, it will take on the characteristics of whoever is there.

== Reception ==
The pilot debuted to mixed — although overall positive — reviews, with comparisons drawn to the Nightmare on Elm Street series of movies (no doubt due to Craven and Englund's involvement), The Twilight Zone, Fantasy Island, Quantum Leap, Cheers, Moonlighting and Topper. Variety was more critical and believed that the only scary thing about Nightmare Cafe is that "NBC put it on its schedule".

== Episodes ==
No.	Title	Original release date
1	"Pilot"	January 29, 1992
Frank Nolan and Fay Peronivic find themselves mysteriously drawn to an all-night café following a surreal brush with death.
2	"Dying Well is the Best Revenge"	March 6, 1992
When Frank gets involved with a married woman whose husband is very possessive, Fay worries for his safety.
3	"Fay & Ivy"	March 13, 1992
Fay's younger sister Ivy comes to the city to visit her, but trouble comes along in the form of her scummy boyfriend Jesse.
4	"The Heart of the Mystery"	March 20, 1992
The café slows down time in order to enable a detective to find the answer to an unsolved murder before his death by gunshot.
5	"Sanctuary for a Child"	March 27, 1992
The café brings Frank back to his hometown, where he befriends a boy whose comatose body lies in the town hospital.
6	"Aliens Ate My Lunch"	April 3, 1992
When a desperate tabloid writer concocts a story about a small-town alien invasion, his simple lie snowballs out of his control.

== References in popular culture ==
- In the fourth-season Seinfeld two-part episode "The Pitch" and "The Ticket" (both aired September 16, 1992), a Nightmare Cafe promotional poster - featuring the three leads in front of the café door - can be seen on one wall of the NBC lobby.
- In The Simpsons episode "Treehouse of Horror V" (aired October 30, 1994), the title of the third segment — "Nightmare Cafeteria" — is a reference to Nightmare Cafe.

== Merchandise ==
A soundtrack, featuring the incidental music of J. Peter Robinson as well as five songs used in the show, was released by Varèse Sarabande in 1992.

== Opening sequence ==
Following the pilot, the remaining five episodes began with an introduction narrated by Robert Englund as Blackie:

"Touch that remote and you die! Now that I've got your attention, here's the deal. See those two people? That's Frank, and that's Fay. Strangers when they met, turns out they've got a lot in common. Both died on the same night, both ended up in the same body of water, and both took refuge in the same all-night cafe. Me, I run the place. Name's Blackie. Been here from the beginning. Now, I know I said Frank and Fay were dead, but the cafe needed a new cook and waitress, so it gave them a second chance at life. They do their job, they get to stick around and help unsuspecting customers turn their lives around. 'Course, anything can happen to those who wander in - their worst nightmares, or their forbidden dreams. Yeah, it all happens here...in this little place we call the Nightmare Cafe."

Another version of this introduction appears on the soundtrack album, also performed by Englund:

"Lost somewhere between Life and Death, Time and Eternity, there are places which, if entered into, will leave you forever changed. This is one such place. Its every door can lead some to that second chance that will turn their lives around... and to others to that reckoning that will end their sleep forever. Welcome to a little place called the Nightmare Cafe."
