= Deathblow =

Deathblow or Death Blow may refer to:

- Coup de grâce
- Deathblow (comics), a fictional character in the Wildstorm Universe
- Death Blow, a fictional film in the Seinfeld episode "The Little Kicks"
- "Deathblow", a 2003 song by Deftones from Deftones
