= The Trip (Seinfeld) =

- Seinfeld episodes
- Episode nos.: Season 4 Episodes 1/2
- Directed by: Tom Cherones
- Written by: Larry Charles
- Production code: 401/402
- Original air dates: August 12, 1992 (Part 1); August 19, 1992 (Part 2)
- Running time: 42 minutes

Guest appearances
- Corbin Bernsen as himself; George Wendt as himself; Fred Savage as himself; Clint Howard as Tobias; Elmarie Wendel as Helene; Peter Murnik as Detective Martel; Debi Monahan as Chelsea; Ricky Dean Logan as The Freak; Vaughn Armstrong as Lt. Coleman; Keith Morrison as Newscaster; Winston J. Rocha as Security Agent; Dyana Ortelli as Chambermaid (Lupe)

Episode chronology
← Previous "The Keys"	Next → "The Pitch"
- Seinfeld season 4

"The Trip" is the two-part fourth season premiere of the NBC sitcom Seinfeld. It comprises the 41st and 42nd episodes of the series overall, which aired on August 12 and August 19, 1992. Following Kramer's move to Los Angeles in the season 3 finale, "The Keys", this two-part episode sends Jerry and George to L.A. in search of Kramer while Jerry appears on The Tonight Show. Their search is complicated when police identifies Kramer as a serial killer known as the "Smog Strangler". The story arc of season 4 starts in the following episode, "The Pitch".

== Plot ==
=== Part 1 ===
George is astonished that Kramer indeed broke into acting in Los Angeles as he vowed. Jerry has been invited on The Tonight Show with airfare and accommodations, so he invites George along to L.A. in search of Kramer. George exasperates Jerry with his overpreparation for the short trip.

In L.A., Kramer looks for work, having somehow already gotten blacklisted from Murphy Brown. His neighbor Helene, seemingly a faded actress, makes apocryphal claims of appearing in a Three Stooges film and being engaged to Mickey Rooney. She desperately implores him to give up and stay with her.

Shopping around his own spec script, "The Keys", Kramer hands a copy to Chelsea, a fellow auditionee, then pushes another copy on Fred Savage, who slips away from him. Chelsea is later found murdered by an unidentified serial killer, and a hardboiled police detective finds Kramer's script on her.

Going through airport security with George inspires Jerry to write some jokes, but, at their hotel, the housekeeper, Lupe, throws out his notes. George indulges in free amenities, and requests that Lupe not tuck in his blankets, pressuring Jerry to request the same despite his indifference.

At NBC Studios, Jerry leaves George alone backstage. George meets Jerry's fellow guests Corbin Bernsen and George Wendt, trapping both in dull conversations with him. George's delusions of sparkling wit are deflated when both Bernsen and Wendt, on air, scornfully recall his inane suggestions for their respective shows. Jerry stumbles over his newly written jokes, and blames Lupe.

In a police interview, one of the hippies Kramer rode with retells Kramer's tall tale about strangling a man. The detective issues an arrest warrant for Kramer. George and Jerry see Kramer identified as the "Smog Strangler" on TV news, and look at each other in disbelief.

=== Part 2 ===
George and Jerry try to convince themselves of Kramer's innocence. George is starving due to refusing to eat breakfast during East Coast lunchtime, but Jerry goes to a payphone to set the record straight with police. He resorts to dialing 911 since they have no change, and uses George's name on a whim. Since they cannot find their own way to the police station, a police car picks them up. The two become insatiably curious about police privileges and unaccountability, even asking to play with the car sirens. To their dismay, their ride is interrupted to arrest a roadside carjacker.

Having wagered a housekeeping tip with Jerry on whether Lupe will tuck in his blankets, George does not know how much to tip; he asks the cuffed carjacker, who turns out to tip far better than Jerry. Before they get to the station, the car is dispatched to apprehend Kramer. Jerry and George unlock the car to tag along, and the carjacker escapes.

In lockup, Kramer is nonchalant and carefree to Jerry and George, but quickly cracks and is dragged away screaming. Under interrogation, Kramer's protestations are silenced by the detective, who zealously profiles his psychology and motives. Kramer is reduced to a blubbering mess by the relentless accusations, but another victim is found while he is detained, proving his innocence. He celebrates "the murderer struck again" with Jerry and George.

Overlooking the San Fernando Valley, Kramer relates, but disavows, the struggle of making it in Hollywood, and declines to return with Jerry and George. Jerry apologizes for their falling-out, and everyone hugs. Lupe has tucked in George's blankets after all, and he sleeplessly struggles to kick them loose. He is still disappointed days later back in New York, but realizes he forgot to tip her.

Kramer returns without fanfare as though he never left, and he and Jerry trade keys once more. Back in L.A., TV news identifies the true Smog Strangler as the escaped carjacker, who remains at large.

== Production ==
The scene in which the man breaks into the car was shot near the Bicycle Shack on Ventura Place in Studio City, California, a short distance from CBS Studio Center, the main studio for Seinfeld. When Kramer is confronted by the police at his apartment (about 12 minutes into part 2), Larry David and episode writer Larry Charles can be seen standing in the crowd behind the officers, at the far right of the scene. The cop riding shotgun is the same actor that would later portray Jake Jarmel. The hotel/apartment that Kramer is staying in while in Hollywood is in the same building that was used in Pretty Woman, in which Jason Alexander co-starred.

This was the only two-part episode of Seinfeld in which both parts had the same name but were aired on two separate dates instead of a one-hour special. However, "The Wallet"/"The Watch" is a continuation episode pairing which also aired on separate dates with a "To Be Continued" at the end of "The Wallet".

Elaine does not appear in either part of "The Trip", and appears only briefly in "The Pitch" and "The Ticket", because Julia Louis-Dreyfus was on maternity leave.

Kramer's first name is missing from the script found on the dead woman's body, a reference to how—at this point in time—no one knows his full name.

The episodes were broadcast much earlier than the typical September premiere for a new season, as NBC wanted to cash in on ratings from the 1992 Barcelona Olympics (which NBC also covered) and as such these two episodes got some of the highest Nielsen ratings thus far.
