= United States Postal Inspection Service =

Federal law enforcement agency

- Logo

- Flag of the U.S. Postal Inspection Service
- Common name: Postal Inspection Service
- Abbreviation: USPIS

Agency overview
- Formed: 1775 (Surveyors); 1801 (Special Agents); 1830 (Agency); 1880 (Post Office Inspectors); 1954 (Postal Inspectors)
- Employees: 2,500 (approximately)

Jurisdictional structure
- Federal agency: United States
- Operations jurisdiction: United States
- General nature: Federal law enforcement
- Specialist jurisdiction: Property, personnel, items of a postal service

Operational structure
- Headquarters: 475 L'Enfant Plaza SW, Washington, D.C.
- Postal Inspectors: 1200 (approximately)
- Agency executive: Gary Barksdale, Chief Postal Inspector
- Parent agency: United States Postal Service

Website
- uspis.gov

The United States Postal Inspection Service (USPIS) is the federal law enforcement arm of the United States Postal Service. It supports and protects the United States Postal Service, its employees, infrastructure, and customers by enforcing the laws that defend the United States' mail system from illegal or dangerous use. Its jurisdiction covers any crimes that may adversely affect or fraudulently use the United States Mail, the postal system, or postal employees. With roots going back to the late 18th century, the USPIS is the country's oldest continuously operating federal law enforcement agency.

There are approximately 200 federal crimes that can be committed that involve the mail. Therefore, the U.S. Postal Inspection Service's activities are broad and ever-changing. In 2025, postal inspectors made 4,495 arrests leading to nearly 4,000 convictions, mostly involving mail theft, mail fraud, and prohibited mailings. The growth in illegal narcotics has resulted in more than 20,000 arrests and the seizure of over $30 million in drug proceeds since 2010. In 2025, postal inspectors made 2,033 arrests involving drug trafficking, seized more than 19,000 kilograms of illegal drugs from the mail, and confiscated more than $18.4 million in illicit proceeds. In some cases, these seizures were performed with the assistance of a detection dog.

As of 2024, there were over 1,200 postal inspectors, who are authorized to carry weapons, make arrests, execute federal search warrants, and serve subpoenas.

== History ==
The Postal Inspection Service has the oldest origins of any federal law enforcement agency in the United States pre-dating the signing of the Declaration of Independence. Its roots can be traced back to 1775 when colonial postmaster general Benjamin Franklin first appointed a "surveyor" to regulate and audit the mail.

When Franklin was appointed Postmaster General under the Second Continental Congress, the audit system he created continued. One of Franklin's first acts as Postmaster General was to appoint William Goddard as the first postal surveyor of the newly founded American postal system, in charge of inspecting the integrity and security of postal routes, regulating post offices, and auditing their accounts. A letter from Franklin to Goddard, dated August 7, 1775, asked Goddard to carry out these duties.

In 1801, the title of "Surveyor" was changed to "Special Agent", and the Postal Inspection Service was the first federal law enforcement agency to use the title Special Agent for its officers. In 1830, the special agents were organized into the Office of Instructions and Mail Depredations. In 1873, one of their primary duties was the enforcement of obscenity prohibitions under the Comstock Act, named after Postal Inspector Anthony Comstock. Congress changed this title to "Post Office Inspector" in 1880 to differentiate the federal postal agents from the multitude of other "special agents" employed by railway and stagecoach companies.

Finally, in 1954, the title changed again to "Postal Inspector" to reflect their relationship to all aspects of the postal system and the U.S. mail, instead of only post offices.

== Jurisdiction and activities ==
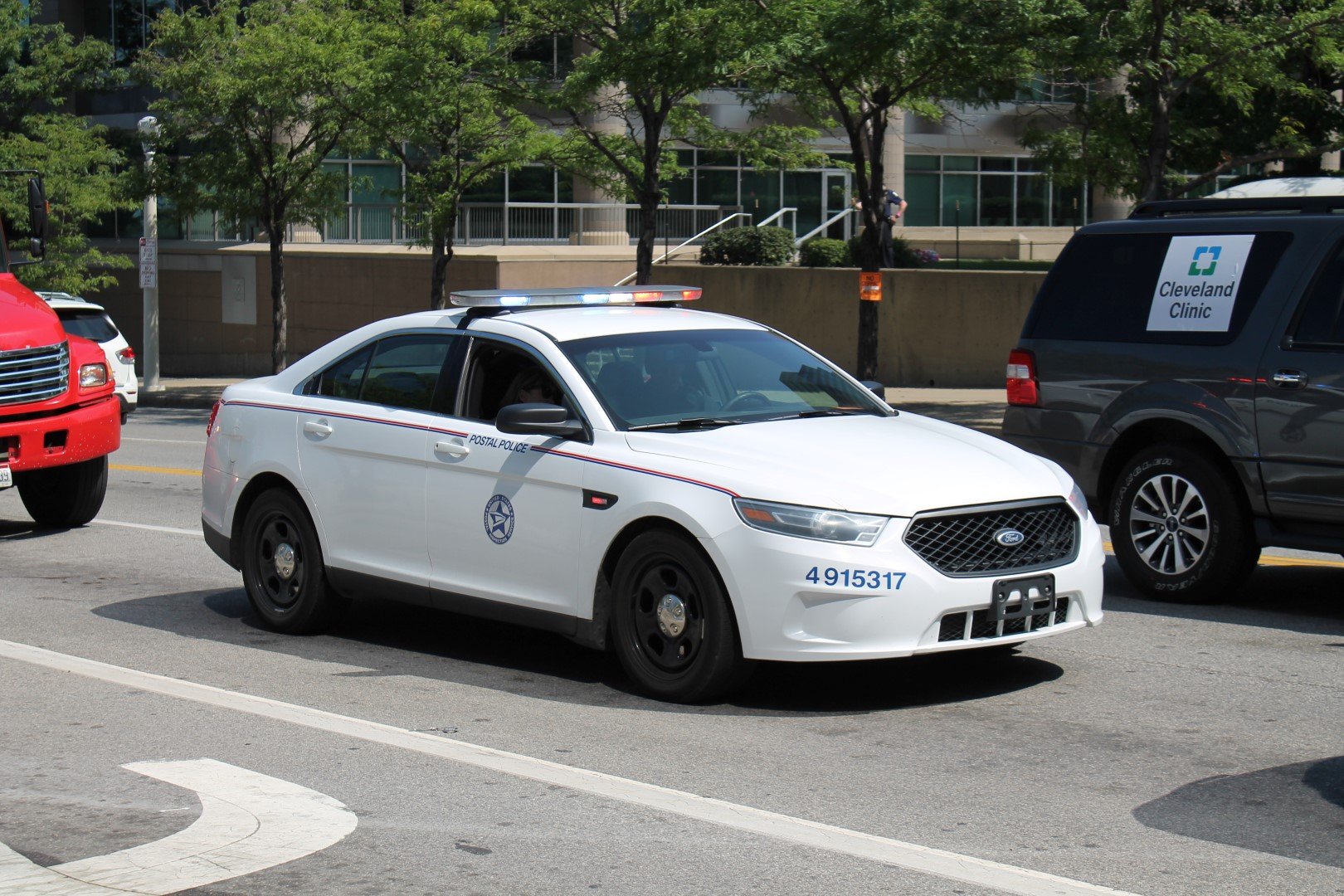
U.S. Postal Police Ford Police Interceptor Sedan, responding with red and blue lights

As fact-finding and investigative agents, postal inspectors are sworn federal law enforcement officers who carry firearms, make arrests, and serve federal search warrants and subpoenas. Inspectors work closely with U.S. attorneys, other law enforcement agencies, and local prosecutors to investigate postal cases and prepare them for court. For example, on cases involving international mail, postal inspectors work closely with U.S. Customs and Border Protection (CBP) or U.S. Immigration and Customs Enforcement’s Homeland Security Investigations (HSI); while on domestic mail cases, Inspectors work closely with state and local law enforcement agencies.

The USPIS has responsibility to safeguard over 640,000 Postal Service employees, approximately 32,000 postal facilities and billions of pieces of mail transported globally each year by air, land, rail, and sea.

Prior to 1996, USPIS was the only investigative agency of the Postal Service, but that changed with the creation of the USPS Office of Inspector General in 1996. The USPS OIG conducts independent audits and investigations of USPS programs and operations to determine whether they are efficient and cost-effective. Before 1996, this auditing function was carried out by Postal Inspectors. These investigations help detect fraud, waste, and misconduct within USPS, and they have a deterrent effect on postal crimes.

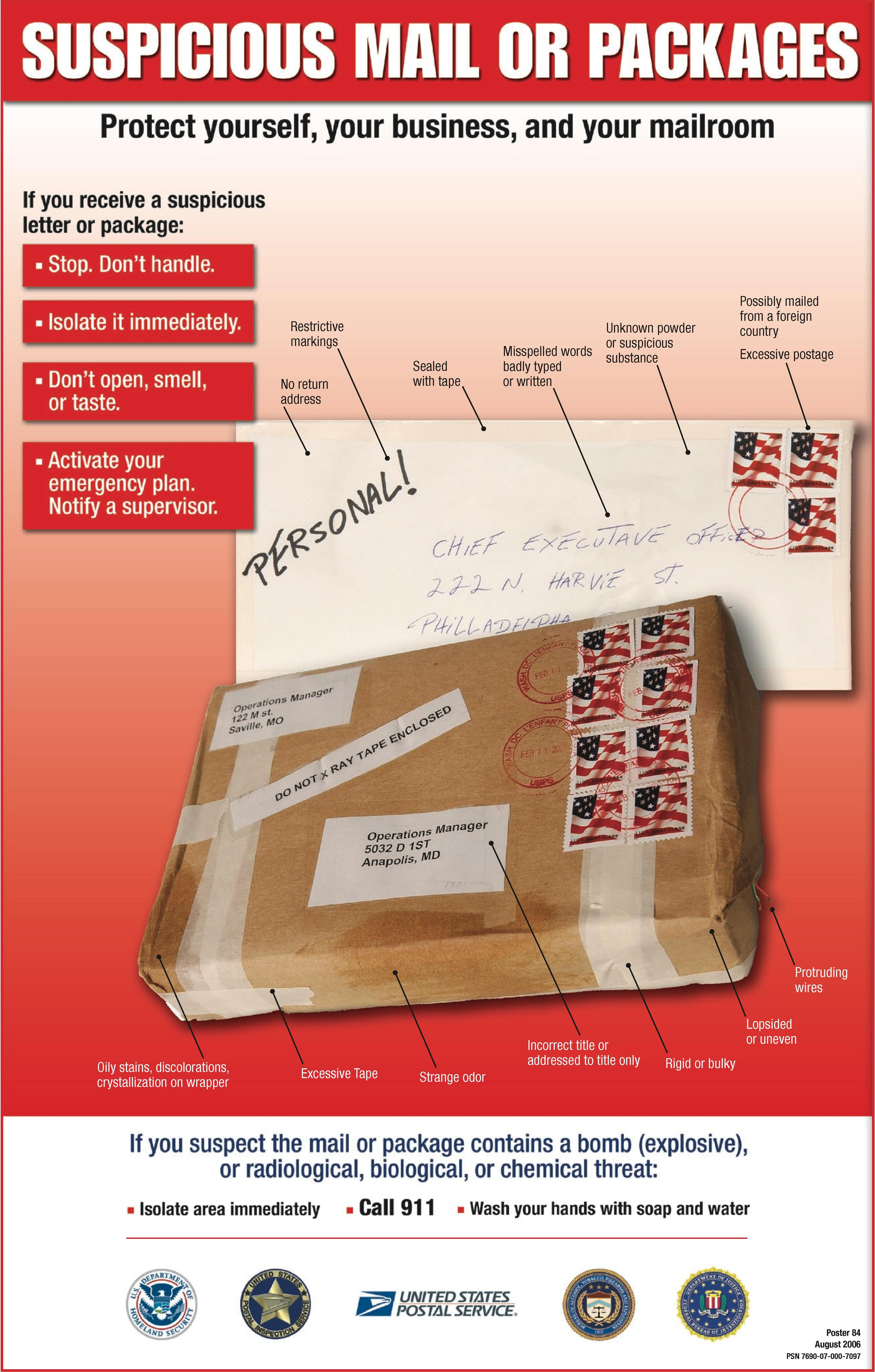
Public service announcement poster of USPIS

Since the September 11, 2001 attacks, the USPIS has also investigated several cases where ricin, anthrax, and other toxic substances were sent through the mail. Although the USPIS has a wide jurisdiction, USPIS investigations can be categorized into seven types of investigative teams and functions:

- Fraud: These types of investigation involve crimes that use the mails to facilitate fraud against consumers, business, and government. Federal statutes that surround these types of investigations include mail fraud and other criminal statutes when they are tied to the mails, such as bank fraud, identity theft, credit card fraud, wire fraud, and Internet/computer fraud. Mail fraud is a statute that is used in prosecuting many white collar crimes, including Ponzi schemes, 419 frauds, and other white collar crimes where the mail was used to facilitate the fraud. This extends to public corruption (under the "Honest Services" provision of the federal fraud statutes). In the 1960s and 70s, inspectors under regional chief postal inspectors, such as Martin McGee, known as "Mr. Mail Fraud," exposed and prosecuted numerous swindles involving land sales, phony advertising practices, insurance ripoffs, and fraudulent charitable organizations using mail fraud charges. McGee is credited with assisting in the conviction of former Illinois governor Otto Kerner on mail fraud charges.
- External Crime and Crime Teams: The External Crimes Function of USPIS is a function that investigates any theft of US mail by non employees, assaults of postal employees, and theft and robberies of postal property. This function also investigates robberies of postal employees and postal facilities, burglaries of postal facilities, and assaults and murders of postal employees. This investigative function ensures that trust in the U.S. mail system is maintained.
- Prohibited Mailing Investigations: Prohibited mailing investigations focus on the prohibited mailing of contraband including: narcotics, precursors, and proceeds; child pornography and other sexually prohibited materials; and hazardous materials to include: mail bombs; and nuclear, biological, and chemical weapons. The laundering of narcotics and other criminal proceeds through the use of postal money orders is sometimes categorized under this investigative function.
- Aviation and Homeland Security: These investigations include the securing and protecting of transportation of U.S. mail and any risk that might compromise the security of the homeland because of these mails. Security audits are conducted by these teams to ensure that postal service facilities are secure from not only theft and robberies but also manmade and natural disasters.
- Revenue Investigations: These investigations identify fraudulent practices conducted by business and consumers that mail items without proper postage or with counterfeit postage and indicia. Also included are any other crimes that defraud the USPS of revenue.
- International Investigations and Global Security: This investigative function ensures that international mail is secured and that international business decisions and campaigns remain safe and secure. USPIS maintains investigators in the U.S. and in posts around the world for protection, liaison, and intelligence.
- Joint Task Force Investigations: USPIS participates in joint task force investigations where laws applicable to the mail service are involved. These cases are often wide-ranging and involve every law enforcement agency of the federal government. For example, USPIS participated in the largest count indictment and conviction in NASA history, the Omniplan case, that put seven companies out of business and ended with the conviction of Omniplan owner, Ralph Montijo, on 179 federal crimes.

The Postal Inspection Service's Technical Services Unit (TSU) provides investigative support through the use of new technology and the operations of two national communication centers known as the National Law Enforcement Control Centers (NLECC). In 2003, U.S. Immigration and Customs Enforcement renamed their national communication center, previously known as "Sector" to the "National Law Enforcement Communications Center" (also known as NLECC). USPIS NLECC and ICE NLECC are two independent federal law enforcement radio communications centers that coincidentally share the same acronym and an almost identical name.

=== Ted Kaczynski, 1978-1996 ===
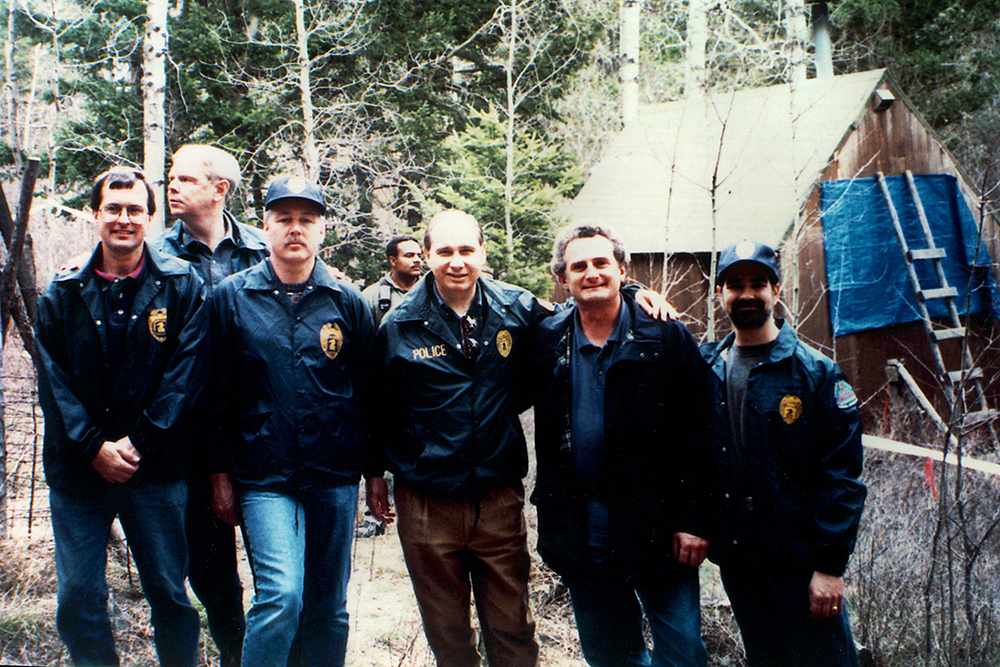
Postal Inspectors were among law enforcement who worked to apprehend Ted Kaczynski.

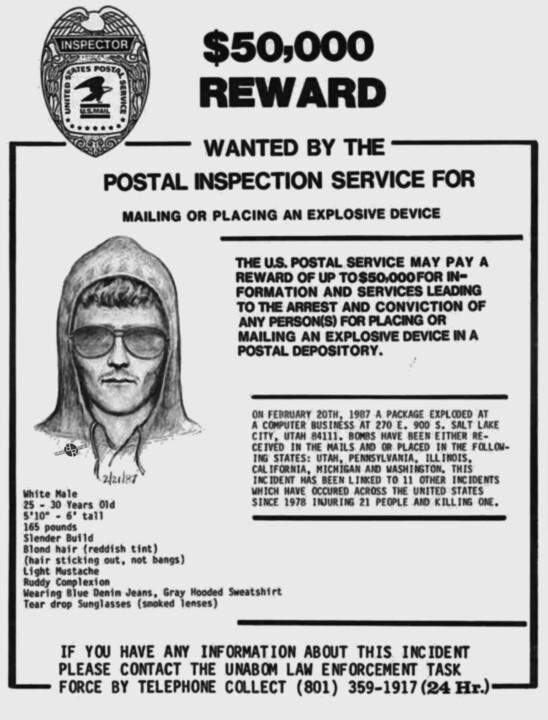
USPIS wanted poster for "The Unabomber"

From 1978 to 1996, Ted Kaczynski, known as the Unabomber, mailed or placed 16 explosive devices, killing three and injuring 26 others. The nine mailed bombs were sent to university professors and airline and advertising executives. Kaczynski's first two bombs were investigated by Postal Inspectors, with the FBI getting involved after he targeted an American Airlines flight in 1979. Chemist Jim Upton from the Inspection Service Crime Lab was the first person to tie the devices to a single bomb maker. Postal Inspectors, FBI and ATF agents created the UNABOM Task Force, a combination of the words "university" and "airline bomber". The first federal agent to interview Kaczynski was Postal Inspector Paul Wilhelmus.

=== National Forensic Laboratory, 1940-present ===
The U.S. Postal Inspection Service first established a crime lab in 1940. Today, the National Forensic Laboratory is located in Dulles, Virginia in a two-story, 44,000-square-foot facility. The lab is staffed by forensic scientists and technical experts and consists of four units: the Questioned Documents Unit, the Fingerprint Unit, the Physical Sciences Unit, and the Digital Evidence Unit. The laboratory is overseen by a laboratory director, and each of the four units is overseen by an assistant laboratory director. There are also four satellite offices, located in New York, Chicago, Memphis, and San Francisco.

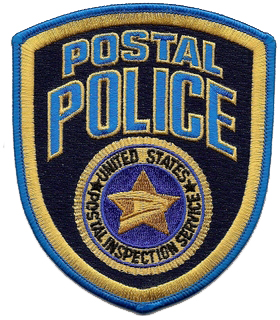
Postal Police Patch

== Police force ==
Postal police officers are the uniformed division of the Postal Inspection Service. They are stationed at major postal facilities throughout the United States. In connection with property owned, occupied, or controlled by the Postal Service, postal police officers enforce Postal Service regulations and applicable federal laws for the protection of persons and property, consistent with statutory and regulatory authority, and ensures safety and security of personnel, customers, property, mail, and mail-in-transit.

== USPIS Academy ==
The Postal Inspection Service maintains an in-residence law enforcement academy located at the W.F. Bolger Center for Leadership Development based in Potomac, Maryland. It is a federally accredited law enforcement academy by the Federal Law Enforcement Training Accreditation (FLETA), and is administered by the Career Development Unit (CDU) of the U.S. Postal Inspection Service.

== Campaigns and programs ==
For more than 150 years, postal inspectors have pursued criminals who use the mail to defraud victims. Their experience with fraud investigations has included many types of schemes from the most simple to highly complex, international frauds. Fraud is a crime that can be reduced or prevented by educating the general public and specific groups who are targeted by scammers, such as the elderly and military veterans. Accordingly, the U.S. Postal Inspection Service has conducted numerous crime prevention campaigns over the years. The following list has been compiled for historical reference.

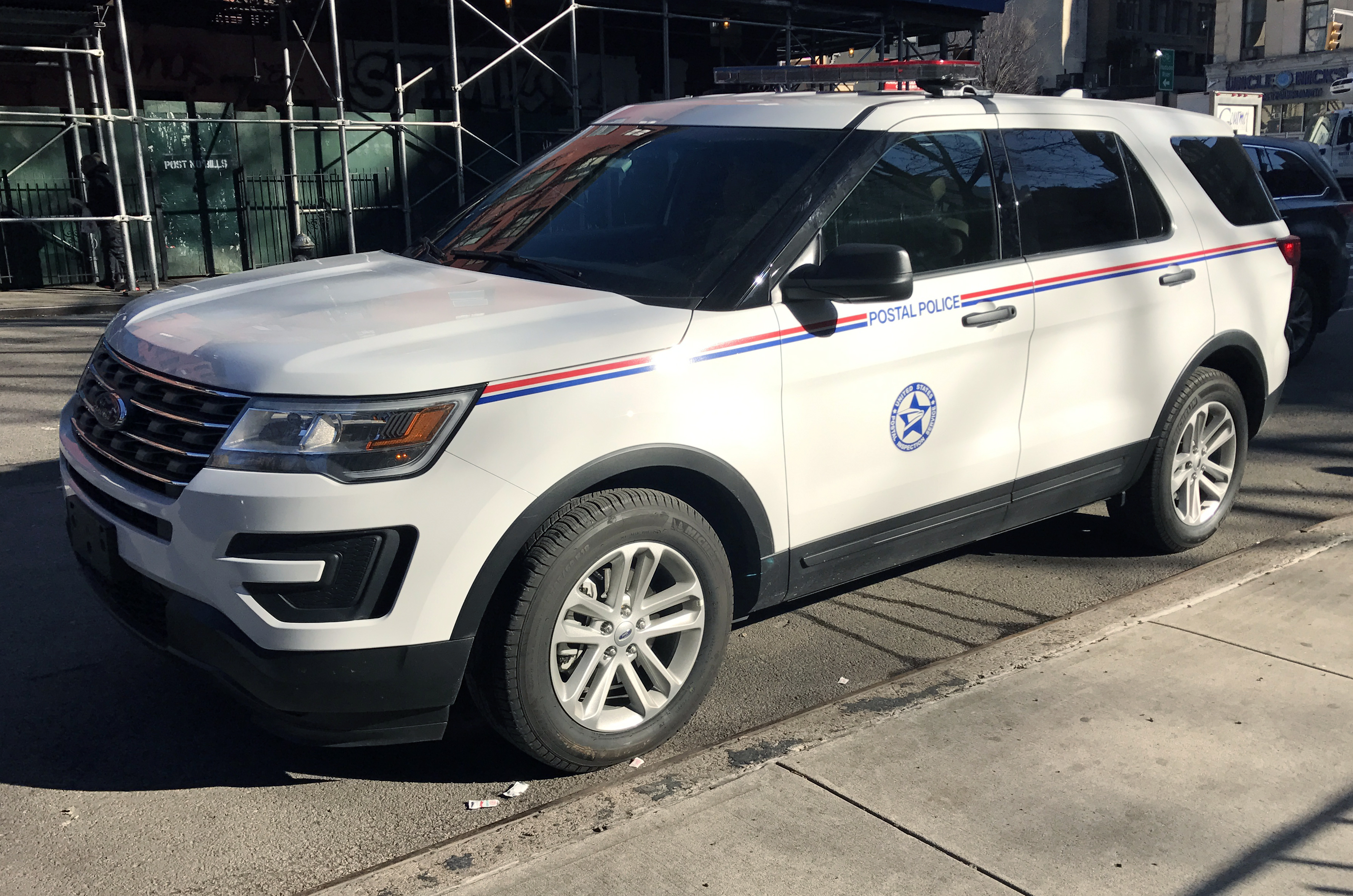
Postal Police vehicle in New York City, a 2016 Ford Explorer

Active Crime Prevention Campaigns:

=== Collaboration with Department of Homeland Security ===
In April 2025, it became known that USPIS was collaborating with the Department of Homeland Security in a task force to detain and deport undocumented immigrants under the second Trump administration.

=== International Association of Financial Crimes Investigators (IAFCI) ===
IAFCI is a non-profit international organization, which provides services and shares information about financial fraud, fraud investigation, and fraud prevention methods. IAFCI members consist of law enforcement, banking, and retail/service members that are in the industry. The Postal Inspection Service plays a significant role coordinating and sponsoring training conferences, which are typically attended by several hundred members, drawn from the various sectors mentioned. Training conferences include sessions related to consumer fraud, identity theft, and credit card fraud, as well as banking and credit card industry best practices.

=== Internet Covert Operations Program ===
The Postal Inspection Service's Internet Covert Operations Program (iCOP) is a surveillance program that monitors social media, cryptocurrency transactions, and USPS internal systems to facilitate "the identification, disruption, and dismantling of individuals and organizations that use the mail or USPS online tools to facilitate black market Internet trade or other illegal activities". The initiative also claims to assess "threats to Postal Service employees and its infrastructure by monitoring publicly available open source information". It is one of seven functional groups falling under the Postal Inspection Service's wider cybercrime program.

In 2019, iCOP produced over 200 intelligence reports for dissemination among USPIS officers.

iCOP intelligence products have led to the seizure of at least $300,000 in cryptocurrency assets.

In April 2021, a leaked bulletin labeled "law enforcement sensitive" was distributed through DHS fusion centers and detailed planned protests on March 20 for the World Wide Rally for Freedom and Democracy. Public exposure of this bulletin raised questions about whether the monitoring of protests and protestors fell under USPIS's area of law enforcement jurisdiction.

According to a 2021 USPIS presentation, obtained by Vice Media Motherboard the iCOP Analytics Team's mission is to, "identify and develop intelligence on targets operating on the clear and dark webs for all Inspection Service investigations. Analytics Team specializes in providing actionable intelligence through cryptocurrency tracking, open source intelligence and social media analysis, geospatial mapping and data visualization, and USPS backend and network data exploitation."

=== National Consumer Protection Week (NCPW) ===
Established in 1998, National Consumer Protection Week is a federal program led by the Federal Trade Commission to educate consumers about various types of fraud, including sweepstakes/prize scams, foreign lottery fraud, mail and Internet fraud, identity theft, and work-at-home scams. Since the program's inception, the Postal Inspection Service has supported NCPW through partnerships with public and private organizations, including the Postal Service Consumer Advocate's Office, AARP, Federal Trade Commission, Consumer Federation of America, Department of Justice, Federal Trade Commission, National Association of Consumer Agency Administrators, National Association of Attorneys General, and others.

=== National Crime Victims’ Rights Week ===
Established in 1981 under the Reagan administration, National Crime Victims’ Rights Week is a federal program led by the Department of Justice (DOJ). The Postal Inspection Service has partnered with the DOJ since the program's founding, helping to communicate the importance of early intervention and victim services in establishing trust with victims, which begins to restore their hope for healing and recovery.

=== Operation Protect Veterans (OPV) ===
In November 2017, AARP Fraud Watch Network and the U.S. Postal Inspection Service jointly announced the launch of Operation Protect Veterans — a national campaign to warn those who have served in the military about scams and fraud schemes that target veterans. AARP and the U.S. Postal Inspection Service warned veterans and their families to be on the lookout for some of the most common schemes and scams directed at veterans. To raise scam awareness among veterans and their families, Operation Protect Veterans utilizes advertising, social media, email messages, brochures, mass mailings, and a website. In a major component of the outreach campaign, printed materials were distributed to over 30,000 Post Offices, AARP's state offices, senior centers, and public libraries.

=== Project Safe Delivery ===
Project Safe Delivery is a crime prevention and law enforcement campaign launched by the United States Postal Service and the Postal Inspection Service in May 2023 to reduce mail theft and letter carrier robberies through multiple efforts, including the deployment of high-security blue collection boxes, the installation of electronic locks to replace older locks, law enforcement surges in locations of heightened criminal activity, and other preventive and protective efforts in coordination with federal, state, and local law enforcement. To strengthen this effort, the Inspection Service also increased monetary rewards for information leading to the arrest and conviction of perpetrators of postal crimes.

=== Video PSAs ===
In response to the COVID-19 pandemic, the U.S. Postal Inspection Service created a video public service announcement (PSA) that provided the public important information about COVID scams. Due to the success of this PSA, the concept was expanded and more PSAs were created to cover a wide range of topics from romance scams to smishing scams. These PSAs are available on the Inspection Service's Facebook, Twitter, Instagram, and YouTube channels, as well as on the USPIS website.

Previous Crime Prevention Campaigns:

=== 2 SMRT 4U ===
In 2006 the Postal Inspection Service created the "2 SMRT 4U" campaign aimed at teenage girls, the group most targeted by online sexual predators. It established the website to educate teens about how to chat and post wisely online. The website has been rebranded NSTeens.org (NetSmartz), but still provides educational information for teens. For its dedication to protecting children and fighting child exploitation, the United States Department of Justice honored the Postal Inspection Service with its Internet Safety Award.

=== Alliance for Consumer Fraud Awareness (ACFA) ===
The ACFA focused on scams that targeted consumers via the U.S. Mail or Internet, involving counterfeit checks, gift checks, traveler's checks, or money orders. Launched in 2007, the campaign sought to increase awareness about the schemes, to give consumers valuable information about protecting their assets, and to provide steps they can take to report solicitations. ACFA was a private-public initiative organized by the U.S. Postal Inspection Service with members representing financial institutions, associations, consumer advocacy groups, and businesses. The Inspection Service provided support to the initiative and the National Consumer Fraud Awareness Campaign it sponsored via the CFF. Other campaign members contributed financially and through in-kind services to the National Consumers League to finance the building and maintenance of the campaign Web site Fakechecks.org and to help distribute information to customers and employees. The website is no longer active.

=== The Consumer Alert News Network (CANN) ===
The Consumer Alert News network was launched in September 2012 as an innovative consumer outreach/fraud prevention campaign. Through CANN, the Postal Inspection Service developed, produced, and distributed a series of 90-second consumer news alerts to local television stations nationwide, which were embedded in the local newscasts. These segments featured consumer alerts and crime prevention tips covering a wide range of subject matter, including identity theft, mail fraud scams, Internet phishing, and international cross-border schemes. They featured Postal Inspectors and actual case victims discussing the nuances of the case and how to avoid falling prey to similar schemes. The series also highlighted the Postal Service's commitment to protecting American consumers. More than 500 news reports were produced and distributed, airing in the news hour on 124 TV stations and reaching over 77 percent of the nation's viewing audience. As CANN culminated in 2017, the Inspection Service created a 30-minute CANN special segment hosted by Terry Serpico of The Inspectors TV show highlighting Inspectors talking about various crimes and scams.

=== Consumer Fraud Forums ===
In 2005, the U.S. Postal Inspection Service sponsored Consumer Fraud Forums in Milwaukee, St. Louis, Atlanta, Charlotte, and Cincinnati. The purpose of the forums was to create an awareness of the consumer fraud program, facilitate discussion on current crime prevention initiatives and strategies, and foster working relationships among various local law enforcement and consumer protection agencies.

=== Crime Watch ===
From 2000 to 2004, the U.S. Postal Inspection Service implemented a program with the North American Precis Syndicate (NAPS) to produce one- and two-column newspaper articles on fraud prevention. The program, called “Crime Watch,” featured articles which were made available to 10,000 daily and non-daily newspapers at the time. The USPIS articles were rated as the most published NAPS articles for four years in a row. The program was later expanded to 30-second radio spots that were aired on more than 700 radio stations nationwide.

=== Deliver Me Home ===
The joint program sponsored by the National Center for Missing and Exploited Children (NCMEC), the U.S. Postal Inspection Service, and the U.S. Postal Service assists Postal Inspectors and other law enforcement officers in their investigation of cases involving abducted or missing children. Combining agency resources increased the chances that an abducted, lost, or missing child would be found and safely delivered home. During 2006, Deliver Me Home was successful in locating 20 missing children, which brought the total to 49 children located since the program's inception in September 2004. Integral to Deliver Me Home were the missing children flyers, which Postal Inspectors dispatched to targeted ZIP Codes to alert communities and seek information that helped locate a missing or abducted child.

=== Delivering Trust Website & Mailer ===
The Postal Inspection Service created the website www.deliveringtrust.com (no longer active) in 2010 to help educate consumers and provide access to resources that allowed them to better protect their privacy and avoid fraud schemes, including those conducted through the mail. Consumers could access free fraud education and prevention videos about identity theft, work-at-home scams, Internet fraud, foreign lotteries, investment scams, and more. The website also offered tips on recognizing scams, and instructions on reporting scammers to the appropriate authorities. To launch the website, Postmaster General Jack Potter and the Chief Postal Inspector sponsored a tri-fold mailer that went to every delivery point in the U.S. The mailer outlined fraud prevention tips and where to report fraud when recognized.

=== Don’t Fall For It ===
With an aim to inform and protect as many consumers as possible about current fraud schemes, the Chicago Division of the United States Postal Inspection Service took to the radio waves in 2009 with Don't Fall For It. The program featured real fraud schemes with the intent the public would hear the message and not fall for the scams. The response was overwhelming, and the show quickly became one of WBIG's most popular programs. During its eight-year run, each week a different guest was interviewed and offered wise counsel on how to protect oneself from being victimized. The show was entertaining and interactive, which allowed consumers to call in, play games, and share fraud experiences. Most importantly, Don't Fall For It provided essential information needed for the public to identify a scam before falling prey to it and informed listeners what to do if they had already been victimized.

=== Fraud Prevention Videos ===
The U.S. Postal Inspection Service partnered with High Noon Production Company to create a series of fraud prevention videos for field inspector presentations. All of the prevention films conclude with prevention tips for the public, describing how to avoid falling prey to the scheme depicted. Work commenced in 2003 that produced nine films over the course of several years covering a range of topics, including fake check scams, telemarketing fraud, work-from-home scams, and others.

=== The Inspectors Television Series ===
In October 2015, The Inspectors television series debuted. The show's primary objective over its four seasons was to raise awareness of consumer fraud, educate the target audience about current scams, and provide tips on how they can avoid becoming victims. By socializing the nature of these crimes, The Inspectors sought to remove the mystique and the shame associated with victimization.

During its run, the show received several awards and honors, including:

- A Daytime Emmy Award for Outstanding Performer in a Children's or Pre-School Children's Series for Jessica Lundy, who starred as Postal Inspector Amanda Wainwright for Season One. In 2019, the show received a second Daytime Emmy for Outstanding Lighting.
- Eight additional Emmy nominations.
- Four Parent's Choice Silver Awards for “offering inspirational messages about not letting anything stop you from working towards your dreams...”
- Two Parents' Choice Recommended Seals, rising above the "Approval" rating based on production quality, appeal and clear intent.
- Recognition from Common Sense Media, who gave the show a four-star rating for family audiences.
- Nine Cynopsis Recognitions with six “Social Good” Awards and three “Kids Imagination” Awards.
- Twenty-nine Telly Awards over the first three seasons.

=== LooksTooGoodToBeTrue.com ===
In October 2005, USPIS partnered with the Merchant Risk Council, Monster Worldwide, Inc., Target Corporation, the Federal Bureau of Investigation, and the National White Collar Crime Center's Internet Crime Complaint Center (IC3) to launch the “LooksTooGoodToBeTrue” initiative, an Internet fraud prevention campaign. The cornerstone of this campaign was the website LooksTooGoodToBeTrue.com which was not maintained by USPIS and is no longer active. Developed by the joint industry/law enforcement group, the site offered in-depth information on the latest Internet scams, including auction fraud, identity fraud, reshipping scams, and foreign lotteries. It also alerted the American public to scams related to Hurricane Katrina and other disasters. The site provided prevention tips to web users and an online risk assessment test to determine how vulnerable users are to scams. Consumers were able to file complaints via the site and order “Web of Deceit,” a free DVD on Internet fraud prevention produced by the U.S. Postal Inspection Service.

=== National Fraud Against Senior Citizens Awareness Week ===
In a hearing before the Senate Permanent Subcommittee on Investigations in June 2001, USPIS representatives and the Pittsburgh Senior Action Coalition discussed the idea of having the Inspection Service and the Coalition initiate a national campaign with other agencies to raise the awareness of older citizens about illegal telemarketing and mail fraud schemes. In support of the effort, the U.S. Senate passed a resolution, introduced by Senators Carl Levin and Susan Collins, designating the week of August 25, 2002, as “National Fraud Against Senior Citizens Awareness Week.” Chief Postal Inspector Lee Heath joined forces with Postmaster General John E. Potter, Federal Trade Commission Chairman Timothy J. Muris, Assistant Attorney General Michael Chertoff, and representatives of the Royal Canadian Mounted Police to announce the campaign kick-off. Popular actress Betty White signed on as campaign spokesperson. More than 50 press events were held in cities nationwide, supplementing a national multimedia campaign encompassing a wide range of activities: fraud awareness posters were created and posted at more than 38,000 Post Offices across the country; brochures were inserted in Postal Service mailings of stamps and philatelic materials; half-page ads were placed in 40 major metropolitan newspapers; public service announcements featuring Betty White were broadcast on television and radio stations; and fraud awareness flyers were mailed to roughly three million households of seniors and their families.

=== Operation: Identity Crisis ===
In September 2003, the U.S. Postal Inspection Service — in conjunction with the U.S. Postal Service, the Federal Trade Commission, the U.S. Secret Service, and various other government agencies and private companies — unveiled a national consumer awareness campaign. Known as “Operation: Identity Crisis,” the campaign focused on the ease with which identity theft occurs and prevention tips to consumers and businesses to help them protect their consumer data and ensure privacy. The campaign featured newspaper ads appearing in 17 newspapers in markets with the highest number of identity theft complaints (Arkansas, California, Florida, Georgia, Illinois, Michigan, New Jersey, New York, Pennsylvania, and Texas) and sent 3 million notices to residents in the above-mentioned states. Jerry Orbach of television's Law & Order, as the national spokesman, appeared in Public Service Announcements.

=== Prizes, Sweepstakes, Foreign Lotteries Campaign ===
In 2005, the U.S. Postal Inspection Service sponsored a fraud prevention campaign in partnership with the Direct Marketing Association (DMA) to inform consumers of prizes and sweepstakes fraud and to protect the public from mailings where they have to pay a fee to receive prize/sweepstakes winnings. An overlapping campaign on foreign lotteries was also carried out to inform consumers of the illegality of playing foreign lotteries in the United States and to protect the public from scams that take their money through the purchase of “tickets” or charge money to collect non-existent winnings. Advertisements were published in magazines with a combined circulation of 14 million readers. The USPS Stamp Fulfillment Center included envelope stuffers in its mailing campaign for a 30-day period. From July – September, 2005, “Long Shot” — the foreign lottery prevention DVD—was made available through the Postal Store and circulated throughout law enforcement and consumer protection communities.

=== Project kNOw Fraud ===
Responding to the proliferation of telemarketing fraud cases, USPIS led an interagency group of law enforcement and consumer organizations in what was named “Project kNOw Fraud.” In 1999, Project kNOw Fraud sent a postcard to every household in America — more than 123 million addresses. The card contained telemarketing fraud prevention tips. The project included a website and toll-free number to call for additional information or to report a fraud. In addition, a telemarketing fraud prevention video was produced and delivered to more than 15,000 public libraries. Funding to print, address, and prepare the mailing for distribution came from money seized by the Postal Inspection Service in a telemarketing fraud case.

=== Work-at-Home Scams: They Just Don’t Pay! ===
In February 2005, USPIS and the U.S. Postal Service's Consumer Advocate office and other federal, state, and local consumer protection agencies launched a campaign informing consumers how to avoid work-at-home schemes. A multimedia approach conveyed the message with ads placed in newspapers and magazines reaching over 45 million readers.

== Badges of the postal inspectors ==
Badges were first issued to all postal inspectors in 1922 but they were prohibited from displaying them in public and to only display them in private if all other means of identification have failed. By 1945 the use of badges had become even more stringent and the badge had to be requested on a case-by-case basis. Starting in 1973, badges are once again issued to all postal inspectors.

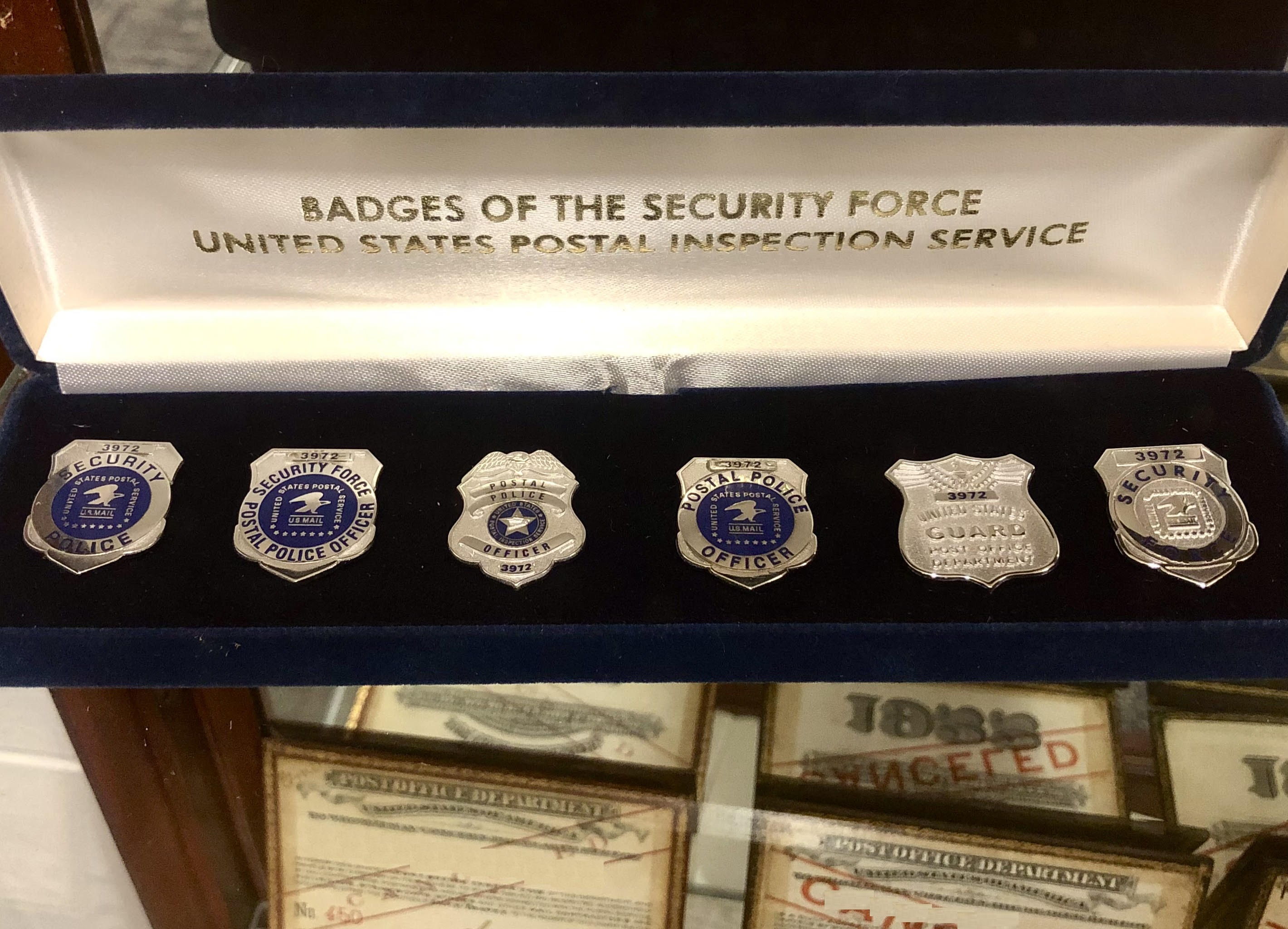
Badges of the Security Force

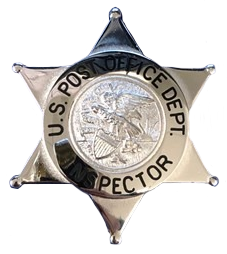
"First edition", used as early as 1900 and as late as 1922

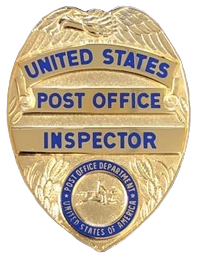
"Second edition", in use by 1924 and used until the 1940s

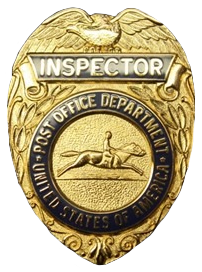
"Third edition", in use between the 1940s and 1973

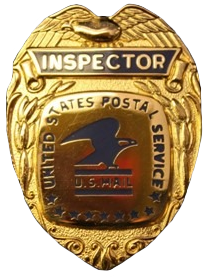
"Fourth edition", in use between 1973 and 2000

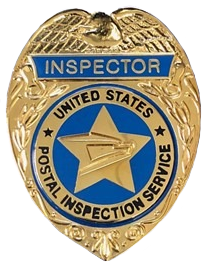
"Fifth edition", in use between 2000 and 2022

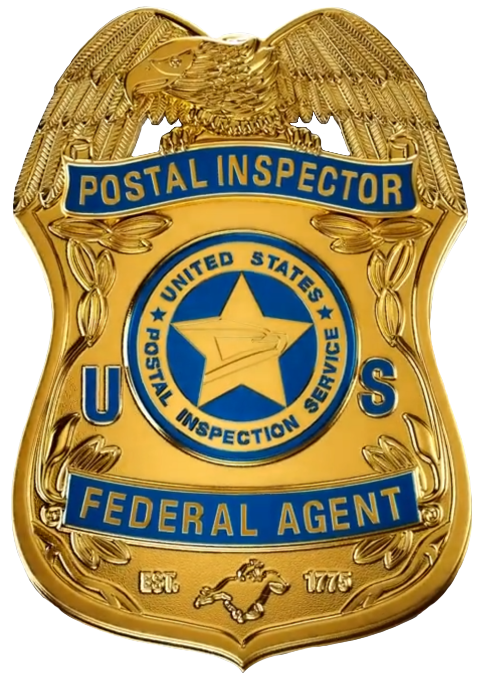
"Sixth edition", currently issued (since January 2022)

== See also ==
- 2001 anthrax attacks
- Diplomatic Security Service
- The Inspectors (TV series)
- John Frank Oldfield
- Letter bomb
- Mobile Mail-Screening Station
- Plymouth Mail robbery
