= John Oldfield (British Army officer) =

English general and colonel-commandant in the Royal Engineers

- Born: 29 May 1789; Portsmouth
- Died: 2 August 1863 (aged 74); Emsworth
- Occupations: General and colonel-commandant in the Royal Engineers

John Oldfield KH (29 May 1789 – 2 August 1863) was an English general and colonel-commandant in the Royal Engineers.

== Biography ==
Oldfield was the only son of John Nicholls Oldfield, lieutenant in the royal marines, who served with distinction on the staff of the army and with the 63rd regiment in the American war, and of Elizabeth, only daughter of Lieutenant Hammond of the royal navy. He was born at Portsmouth on 29 May 1789. He was descended from Sir Anthony Oldfield, created a baronet in 1660, and he claimed to be fifth baronet, but the proof was incomplete. A re-creation was deemed to be necessary, the cost of which Oldfield declined to incur, and the matter dropped. His father retired from the service about the date of Oldfield's birth, and purchased a small estate at Westbourne, Sussex. He died in 1793.

In 1799 Oldfield's uncle, Major Thomas Oldfield, of the royal marines, was killed at St. Jean d'Acre. The distinguished conduct of this officer led to offers from Lord St. Vincent, Lord Nelson, and Sir Sidney Smith to provide for John Oldfield in the navy, while Earl Spencer offered a commission in the royal marines, and the Marquis Cornwallis a nomination for the Royal Military Academy at Woolwich. The latter was accepted. When Oldfield was old enough to go to Woolwich, he was only four feet six inches high, and a dispensing order had to be obtained from the master-general of the ordnance to allow of his admission to the Royal Military Academy, the minimum standard being then four feet nine inches. The junior cadets at that time went first to Great Marlow, Buckinghamshire, where he joined, on 23 August 1803, and was afterwards transferred to Woolwich. When George III inspected the cadets on 29 May 1805, Oldfield was one of the seniors. The king was struck with his diminutive stature, asked his name and age, and spoke to the lad of his uncle's services at St. Jean d'Acre.

Oldfield joined the Trigonometrical Survey at Bodmin in Cornwall in September 1805. He was commissioned as second lieutenant in the royal engineers on 2 April 1806, and quartered at Portsmouth. He was promoted to be lieutenant on 1 July. The following summer he was sent to Halifax, Nova Scotia, and after two years' service in North America he returned to England, and in September 1809 was stationed at Dorchester. He was promoted second captain on 1 May 1811.

From Dorchester he went to Fort George in Scotland, and remained there until he embarked for Holland in 1814. He landed at Hellevoetsluis on 28 March, and entered Antwerp with Sir Thomas Graham on 5 May. He was promoted captain on 26 January 1815. He was at Brussels on 7 April 1815, when he heard of Napoleon's escape from Elba, and at once packed his family off to England, to Westbourne. Oldfield was sent to Ypres to construct new works of defence, and was entrusted with the inundation of the country round, a troublesome and thankless operation. He shortly after joined the army of the Duke of Wellington as brigade-major of royal engineers. He made a sketch-plan of the plains of Waterloo for the use of the duke, and took part in the battle of Waterloo and the occupation of Paris. In April 1819, in consequence of a reduction in the corps of royal engineers, he was placed on half-pay, and passed his time chiefly at Westbourne.

In October 1823 he was sent on a special commission to the West Indies. He returned in 1824, and was quartered for some years in Ireland. On 23 July 1830 he was promoted brevet-major and made a K.H. for his services in 1815. In September he was appointed commanding royal engineer in Newfoundland. On 19 November 1831 he was promoted lieutenant-colonel. In October 1835 he returned to England, and was appointed to the command of the royal engineers at Jersey. In March 1839 he was sent to Canada as commanding royal engineer and colonel on the staff. He was there during the rebellion and rendered good service. On 9 November 1841 he was promoted colonel in the army, and appointed aide-de-camp to the queen. He returned from Canada in the spring of 1843, and was appointed commanding royal engineer in the western district. He was promoted regimental colonel on 9 November 1846, and was appointed to command the royal engineers in Ireland in 1848. On 20 June 1854 he was promoted major-general, and went to live at Westbourne. He became lieutenant-general on 10 May 1859. He was made a colonel-commandant of the corps of royal engineers on 25 October 1859, and was promoted general on 3 April 1862. He died at Emsworth on 2 August 1863, and was buried at Westbourne.

Oldfield was thrice married: first, on 12 March 1810, at Dorchester, to Mary, daughter of Christopher Ardens, esq., of Dorchester, Dorset, by whom he had seven children (she died at Le Mans, France, on 6 July 1820); secondly, on 8 July 1822, at Cheltenham, to Alicia, daughter of the Rev. T. Hume, rector of Arden, by whom he had eight children (she died at Plymouth on 5 February 1840); and, thirdly, on 12 March 1849, at Plymouth, to Cordelia Anne, daughter of the Rev. D. Yonge (she survived him). Oldfield's eldest son, John Rawdon, was a colonel in the Bengal engineers; Anthony, a captain in the royal artillery, was killed at Sebastopol; Rudolphus, a captain in the royal navy, C.B., and aide-de-camp to the queen, died on 6 February 1877; Richard was in the royal artillery, and was also a general officer. Oldfield contributed 'Memoranda on the Use of Asphalte' to the 'Professional Papers of the Corps of the Royal Engineers,' new ser. vols. iii. and v.
