= The Truth (Seinfeld) =

- Seinfeld episode
- Episode no.: Season 3 Episode 2
- Directed by: David Steinberg
- Written by: Elaine Pope
- Production code: 302
- Original air date: September 25, 1991

Guest appearances
- Valerie Mahaffey as Patrice; Siobhan Fallon as Tina

Episode chronology
← Previous "The Note"	Next → "The Pen"
- Seinfeld season 3

"The Truth" is the 19th episode of the NBC sitcom Seinfeld. It is the second episode of the show's third season, first airing on September 25, 1991. Directed by David Steinberg, this is the first episode (other than the pilot) not directed by Tom Cherones. Steinberg would later direct three others. The episode is the first written by Elaine Pope. She later co-wrote a Seinfeld episode with Larry Charles, "The Fix-Up", that won an Emmy Award in 1992 for Outstanding Individual Achievement in Writing in a Comedy Series. She also is credited for the story of one other episode, "The Cheever Letters". Both Steinberg as a guest star and Pope as a writer worked on Fridays, a show that included Larry David and Michael Richards as cast members.

== Plot ==
George is dating Patrice, an accountant and former IRS agent, who wears a cheongsam and hair sticks on a date, aspires to make papier-mâché hats as a career, and quotes Thomas Carlyle. Weary of her behavior, George tries to break up without blaming her. Patrice demands the truth from George, and, in an outburst, he accuses her of pretentiousness. George takes Patrice's calm and collected reaction at face value.

However, Jerry had been relying on George to secure Patrice's help to extricate him from a tax audit, caused by taking deductions for donating to a relief fund for a bogus Krakatoa eruption. Jerry blames Kramer for interrupting his first date with Elaine to fundraise, and Elaine mocks Jerry for trying to impress her by donating $50. Having forgotten all this, George lets Patrice leave with Jerry's tax records in hand.

George's faith in his own brutal honesty proves unfounded, as Patrice fails to return to work, and checks herself into a depression clinic, to Jerry's dismay. At the clinic, George grudgingly reconciles with Patrice for Jerry's sake, but Patrice has already thrown out Jerry's papers. Having failed to make copies, Jerry is reduced to revisiting stores one by one to reassemble old receipts, while George continues to suffer through Patrice's artistic whims.

Kramer, dating Elaine's roommate Tina, creates many unwelcome impositions at Elaine's apartment, including leaving the kitchen in disarray, playing loud tribal dance music while rambunctiously making out on the couch, and walking in on Elaine without warning while she is naked. He also finds a discarded windshield and turns it into a coffee table, despite being warned that the glass is invisible. Noticing Elaine's exasperation, Kramer and Tina ask her for the truth, but she does not repeat George's mistake and answers diplomatically. Excited by Elaine's approval, Tina and Kramer roll into the coffee table with the lights out, smashing it and severely injuring themselves.

== Reception ==
The 16.7 million viewers (19% share, rank of 51) of the episode on its first airing fell well below the 21.7 million viewers (25% share, rank of 24) of the season three premiere, The Note. Web reviews generally give the episode a relatively low ranking. Matt Singer on Screen Crush ranks it at 153 out of 169, commenting that Jerry's storyline “feels like a waste.” Larry Fitzmaurice on Vulture rates it at 134 out of 169. The staff at Place to Be Nation give it ratings of 4 or 5 on a 1 to 10 scale. Collin Jacobson on DVD Movie Guide calls it a solid show but too reliant on Kramer's “schtick.” The hosts of Seincast find it solid but forgettable. More positively, Tina is one of their favorite Kramer girlfriends.
