= The Package (Seinfeld) =

- Seinfeld episode
- Episode no.: Season 8 Episode 5
- Directed by: Andy Ackerman
- Written by: Jennifer Crittenden
- Production code: 805
- Original air date: October 17, 1996

Guest appearances
- Wayne Knight as Newman; Len Lesser as Uncle Leo; Richard Roat as Dr. Berg; Fort Atkinson as Dr. Stern; David Purdham as Dr. Resnick; Heather Campbell as Sheila; Ramon Franco as Mailman; Bari K. Willerford as Ron; Shuko Akune as Receptionist; F. William Parker as Country Doctor; Lyn Alicia Henderson as Clerk; Bill Gratton as Postal Official; Susan Leslie as Nurse

Episode chronology
← Previous "The Little Kicks"	Next → "The Fatigues"
- Seinfeld season 8

"The Package" is the 139th episode of the American television sitcom Seinfeld. This was the fifth episode for the eighth season, originally airing on NBC on October 17, 1996.

In this episode, Elaine cannot receive medical treatment for her rash because of a reputation for being a "difficult" patient, Kramer offers Jerry a method to get a refund on a stereo that is two years out of warranty, and George discovers that Sheila, a clerk at the photo store, is looking at his pictures.

== Plot ==
While consulting her doctor about a rash, Elaine notices that her medical chart notes her as "difficult". When Elaine objects to the description, he dismisses her without examining the rash. Elaine tries to sneak her file out of the doctor's office, but he catches her and takes it back. She tries other doctors, but her chart is passed on to her newer providers and they likewise refuse her treatment.

Kramer says he can get Jerry a refund on a finicky stereo that is two years out of warranty. After Jerry lets him take the stereo, Kramer smashes it and mails it to him in an insured package, intending Jerry to claim it was destroyed in transit. Jerry refuses delivery of an unexpected package with no return address, fearing it may be a bomb. Uncle Leo accepts it in his stead.

Sheila, a clerk at the photo store, flirts with George when he picks up his photos, commenting on a mustard stain that appears in one. He photographs everything, even Jerry taking a screwdriver to his stereo, as an excuse to see her again. A lingerie model's picture is accidentally mixed in with George's photos; he assumes it is a photo of Sheila she inserted as a come-on. Kramer convinces George to return the compliment with seductive pictures of himself. After George drops off the pictures to be developed, Sheila goes on break and passes the job on to her co-worker, Ron. Enticed by the photos, Ron takes his own racy photo and mixes it in with George's photos. When Sheila informs George that she can not find his photos, he assumes she kept them and asks her out. She eagerly accepts.

Kramer's plan to make the post office pay for the stereo backfires when Jerry gets caught. Newman grills him on suspicion of mail fraud. Jerry points out that he has no proof. By chance Newman sees the photo of Jerry with his stereo and confiscates George's photos as evidence, forcing Jerry to pay a fine. He also sees the racy pictures of George and Ron and accuses George of being involved in a mail-order pornography ring. Seeing Newman's blown-up photos of George and Ron, Sheila runs from George in horror.

Leo's stove explodes, singeing off his eyebrows. Elaine accompanies Leo during his doctor's visit, trying to get a diagnosis for the rash. She panics and flees when the doctor steps out, drawing a new pair of eyebrows on Leo to keep him quiet. This makes him look angry, and his doctor writes him up as "difficult". She gets Kramer to pose as the fictitious Dr. Van Nostrand and ask for her medical charts. Kramer fumbles on his cover story and a file is opened on him. After Kramer contracts Elaine's rash, Elaine, Kramer, and Leo visit a medical office in a rural location, but the doctor is alerted about them.

== Production ==
Phil Hartman makes an uncredited voice appearance in this episode as the man who wakes Elaine to confirm the spelling of her surname. The farmer extra appearing in the final scene is Seinfeld writer David Mandel.

A scene showing how Newman acquired George's photos was filmed but cut before broadcast.

Elaine refers to the nipple incident in the season 4 episode "The Pick" when asked if she has done risqué photos of herself. Kramer poses as "Dr. Van Nostrand, from the clinic". Kramer reprises this character in the season 9 episode "The Slicer". The character is also referenced in "The Strike".

The scene when Newman questions Jerry after accusing him of mail fraud is a parody of a scene from the film Basic Instinct, when John Correli (also played by Wayne Knight) questions Catherine Tramell after the killing of Johnny Boz.

== Merchandise ==
A photo from George's risque photo shoot was released in poster form a year after the episode was broadcast, under the title "The Timeless Art of Seduction". It became a major bestseller.
