= The Bubble Boy (Seinfeld) =

- Seinfeld episode
- Episode no.: Season 4 Episode 7
- Directed by: Tom Cherones
- Written by: Larry Charles; Larry David
- Production code: 407
- Original air date: October 7, 1992

Guest appearances
- Jessica Lundy as Naomi; Brian Doyle-Murray as Mel; Carol Mansell as the Bubble Boy's Mother; O-Lan Jones as Waitress; Jon Hayman as Voice of Donald; George Gerdes as Man #1

Episode chronology
← Previous "The Watch"	Next → "The Cheever Letters"
- Seinfeld season 4

"The Bubble Boy" is the 47th episode of the American sitcom Seinfeld. It is the seventh episode of the fourth season. In this episode, a weekend cabin trip upstate is derailed when Jerry and Elaine get stranded without directions, and George and Susan end up visiting Jerry's fan, an immunodeficient "bubble boy", in Jerry's place.

The episode was directed by Tom Cherones and written by Larry David and Larry Charles, airing on NBC on October 7, 1992.

== Plot ==
Jerry is still dating Naomi, the restaurant hostess, but cannot avoid triggering her cartoonish laugh. George leaves a voicemail about their weekend plans at Susan's father's upstate cabin, and quotes Jerry comparing Naomi's laugh to "Elmer Fudd sitting on a juicer". Naomi hears this, and walks out.

Jerry and George want to invite Elaine in Naomi's place, but need to leave out Kramer—since Susan is still not over him vomiting on her—without snubbing him. By chance, Kramer has bought his way into weekend golfing at Westchester Country Club with one of Susan's father's Cuban cigars, so they disingenuously go through the motions of inviting him to the cabin. They assure him there is no golfing there, since it is "pie country".

Jerry shows Elaine how he is obliged to personalize signed photos with weak jokes. A trucker recognizes Jerry as the favorite comedian of his son Donald, who lives inside a sterile plastic "bubble" due to severe combined immunodeficiency. The trucker asks Jerry to visit the next day for Donald's birthday, and Elaine twists his arm despite the cabin trip conflicting. Luckily, Susan recognizes the trucker's address as on their way, so everyone departs as planned.

Jerry leaves his directions at home, instead following Susan and George's car. After they leave, Kramer, whose golfing was preempted, finds both Jerry's directions and a reconciliatory phone call from Naomi. He drives her to the cabin, unannounced.

George, who relishes gratuitously "making good time" on the road, thoughtlessly leaves Jerry and Elaine in the dust. George and Susan wait at the trucker's house, in case Jerry somehow finds his way. They discover that Donald is ill-mannered and verbally abusive, but humor Donald's mother by playing Trivial Pursuit as Donald taunts them the whole while. Donald is about to win by naming "the Moors" as the 8th-century invaders of Spain, but George denies him victory on the technicality that the answer is misprinted as "Moops". Donald throttles George with the gloves built into his bubble, inciting a tussle in which Susan pops the bubble.

Jerry and Elaine give up and visit a diner, where Elaine volunteers Jerry to donate a signed photo. Elaine's mockery makes Jerry regret his personalized rhyme for "diner", but he has no extra photos. Jerry obstinately demands the photo back, aggravating the waitress until she throttles him. The ensuing tussle is broken up by townfolk gathering a mob in reprisal for George sending their beloved bubble boy to the hospital. Jerry and Elaine find George still arguing over the "Moops" at the house, and Jerry delivers his birthday greeting before they and Susan are all run out of town.

After stockpiling pies, Kramer finds no one at the cabin, and breaks in. He and Naomi go night swimming, leaving a lit cigar unattended. Everyone else finally arrives to find the cabin burning down; Kramer runs into the fire to rescue his cigars.

== Production ==
The "Moops" misprint incident was based on a real-life incident that occurred to one of the Seinfeld writers while playing Jeopardy! The Board Game (9th Edition, 1972).

== Eponymous computer virus ==
On November 10, 1999, a computer virus named "BubbleBoy" was discovered, apparently named after this episode. This was the first malware of its kind, having been able to activate itself (via an embedded Visual Basic script) upon the recipient opening the e-mail contents, as opposed to running an attachment. As such, in spite of not being dangerous, the virus changed the concept of antivirus technology.
