= The Watch (Seinfeld) =

- Seinfeld episode
- Episode no.: Season 4 Episode 6
- Directed by: Tom Cherones
- Written by: Larry David
- Production code: 406
- Original air date: September 30, 1992

Guest appearances
- Bob Balaban as Russell Dalrymple; Peter Crombie as 'Crazy' Joe Davola; Lewis Dauber as doorman; Jessica Lundy as hostess; Stephen McHattie as Dr. Reston

Episode chronology
← Previous "The Wallet"	Next → "The Bubble Boy"
- Seinfeld season 4

"The Watch" is the 46th episode of the sitcom Seinfeld. It is the sixth episode of the fourth season of the series, and first aired on NBC on September 30, 1992. Continuing from the previous episode, "The Wallet", George, holding out for more money for his and Jerry's TV pilot, gets his bluff called; Jerry must get his discarded watch back from Uncle Leo before his parents realize that he threw away their gift; and Dr. Reston turns the tables on Kramer when he pretends to be a rival for Elaine's affection.

== Plot ==
Still at dinner, Morty is on the verge of figuring out that the watch he and Helen gave Jerry, and the watch that Uncle Leo fished out of the trash, are one and the same. Meanwhile, Helen pressures Jerry to ask the restaurant hostess out, making him hesitant despite the hostess's flirtatiousness.

Susan notifies George that NBC president Russell Dalrymple has called George's bluff and rescinded Jerry and George's pilot order, since—just as Jerry predicted—they have nothing of merit over any other contenders. Desperate to appeal to Dalrymple immediately, George wrestles Susan for her purse, containing Dalrymple's home address.

To help Elaine break up with Dr. Reston, Kramer calls Reston, posing as her boyfriend. Kramer puts on a show of intimidating Reston, but Reston's off-screen replies turn Kramer deferential. Kramer accommodates Reston's request to speak in person, forgetting that he is free to refuse.

Despite not having his wallet, Morty fights with Jerry for the restaurant check as always; this proves futile when the maître d' turns down Morty's promise to pay by mail. Meanwhile, Jerry corners Leo in the men's room and demands to buy the watch back for far more than it's worth, but Morty catches them in the act. Later, Jerry indeed asks the hostess out, but discovers too late her bizarre, cartoonish laugh.

George seizes the concierge phone at Dalrymple's highrise apartment building and begs to be let in. Interrupting Dalrymple's dinner, George blathers on as if to close the deal, even as Dalrymple offers him nothing. With his dinner companion growing bored, Dalrymple finally agrees to George undercutting the original price, so that he will leave.

At Reston's office, Kramer is beguiled into gladly endorsing Reston and Elaine as a couple. Waiting downstairs, Elaine encounters "Crazy" Joe Davola, knowing nothing about him, and they hit it off. Davola consults Reston after Kramer, and gushes over his newfound love for Elaine.

Morty and Helen accept Jerry's apology, while George eats crow for his self-sabotage with NBC. Jerry thoughtfully replaces Morty's lost wallet, secretly loaded with money to also reimburse his lost cash. Seeing Velcro on the wallet, Morty sours on the gift and throws it away without looking inside. Uncle Leo, who is driving Morty and Helen to the airport, fishes the wallet out of the trash.
