= The Kiss Hello =

- Seinfeld episode
- Episode no.: Season 6 Episode 17
- Directed by: Andy Ackerman
- Written by: Larry David & Jerry Seinfeld
- Production code: 614
- Original air date: February 16, 1995

Guest appearances
- Liz Sheridan as Helen Seinfeld; Barney Martin as Morty Seinfeld; Len Lesser as Uncle Leo; Wendie Malick as Wendy; Mary Scheer as Joan; Billye Ree Wallace as Nana; Carol Leifer as Receptionist; Julio Oscar Mechoso as Julio; Rondi Reed as Mary; Eugene Elman as Buddy; Louisa Abernathy as Nurse

Episode chronology
← Previous "The Beard"	Next → "The Doorman"
- Seinfeld season 6

"The Kiss Hello" is the 103rd episode of the NBC sitcom Seinfeld. This is the 17th episode for the sixth season. It aired on February 16, 1995. Although this was the 102nd episode to air, the cast and crew of the series credit this as the 100th episode because it is the 100th episode created. In this episode, Kramer breaks the ice between all the tenants in the building just as Jerry resolves to quit getting kissed hello. Elaine uses Kramer to criticize her friend Wendy's hair; Wendy's clinic policies get George coming and going; and Jerry's nana remembers Uncle Leo's decades-old debt to Jerry's mother.

== Plot ==
Jerry rues having let Elaine's friend Wendy start kissing him hello, but puts up with it. Since Wendy is a physical therapist, George seeks advice for wrist pain. Elaine reprimands him for imposing on Wendy outside work, but George fumes that this taboo is just an excuse to charge fees. Jerry and Elaine discuss Wendy's hopelessly outdated hairstyle, and realize that only Kramer could tactlessly criticize it to her face—but only if he is not told to do so.

Jerry and Uncle Leo both get called to open Jerry's nana's ketchup. Due to memory impairment, Jerry's nana drifts back to forty-five years ago, when Leo was given $100 in racetrack winnings to split with Jerry's mother. Jerry confirms that his mother never got her $50, even as Leo denies that this ever happened.

Kramer, wanting every building tenant on first-name basis, is posting everyone's names and photos in the lobby. Jerry objects, not wanting to get held up by small talk, but Kramer searches his apartment for photos, then ambushes him with a camera. Elaine, blaming Wendy's hair for her never dating, sets her up to run into Kramer at Jerry's. Jerry hides behind his fridge door to rebuff Wendy's kiss hello. To Elaine's dismay, Kramer prizes Wendy's hairstyle as unique, and they start dating.

George consults Wendy, but she charges him for a last-minute cancellation, and is unsympathetic that he had to drive his mother. It is also too late to cancel his next session. Kramer posts Jerry's goofy photo, and he is inundated by greetings and chitchat; worse, more women start kissing him hello, which he vows to stop at any cost. Kramer defies him with a firm kiss on the mouth.

Wendy cancels last-minute on George to go skiing with Elaine. Wendy drives Elaine home, but not all the way; to avoid a loop of one-way streets, she leaves Elaine to fumble with her ski gear for three blocks. Leo suddenly moves Jerry's nana to a nursing home; Jerry suspects he means to silence her. At the home, Jerry finds his nana's former neighbor, who corroborates the racetrack winnings, letting Jerry finally corner Leo.

Elaine confronts Wendy for forsaking her and causing a shoulder injury; George overhears and realizes Wendy had no good excuse for canceling on him. Wendy takes no responsibility for either of them, so they finally criticize her hair to her face before leaving. Wendy changes her hairstyle, and Kramer dumps her.

Jerry backs out of every kiss hello; overnight, he becomes the pariah of the building, with his photo defaced and the building manager neglecting to restore his hot water. The other tenants bond over kisses hello while shunning him. Jerry is forced to shower at Kramer's, but Kramer cannot be seen with Jerry as their neighbors, kissing Kramer hello, arrive for a party.

== Production ==
Because "The Kiss Hello" was the 100th episode of Seinfeld to be produced, the cast and crew were all given commemorative "100th" jackets at the table-read for the episode.

Wendy's receptionist is played by staff writer Carol Leifer, who was to some degree the real-life inspiration for the Elaine character. During table-reads, Leifer would often read the parts of minor characters who had not yet been cast; she was asked to play the part of the receptionist after reading it at the table-read.
