= Lewis Dauber =

American actor (1949–2019)

- Born: April 27, 1949; New York City, U.S.
- Died: October 3, 2019 (aged 70); Pacific Palisades, California, U.S.
- Occupation: Actor
- Years active: 1984–2017
- Spouse: Paulette
- Children: 2

Lewis "Lew" Dauber (April 27, 1949 – October 3, 2019) was an American character actor. He was best known for his frequent casting as a clergyman, appearing as such in various productions over more than two decades.

== Early life and career ==
Although born in New York City, Dauber earned his bachelor's degree in California from the University of California, Berkeley, where he performed as building inspector Henri Cotte (Henri Paillardin in the original), in the school's 1969 production of Hotel Paradiso. After graduation, he became an employee of Citibank, where he sold traveler's checks, though he soon quit to pursue a career in show business. While he managed to land some small commercial parts, it was his appearance on a second-season episode of The Fall Guy, alongside Lee Majors and Tony Curtis, that earned him his first credited acting role.

Despite having steady work most of his career, Dauber found time to return to school later in life, earning his master's degree at Mount St. Mary's University. Following his graduation, he would return to teach in the university's department of film, media and social justice. Additionally, he served on the SAG-AFTRA credit union board of directors.

== Personal life and death ==
On May 25, 1986, Dauber married Paulette Levin, a publicist for the Walt Disney Company whose credits also include Dodgeball: A True Underdog Story, Rent, Unaccompanied Minors and Mars Needs Moms. Together, the couple had two sons, Jeff and Zach.

Dauber died of liver cancer on October 3, 2019, in Los Angeles, California, at the age of 70.

== Partial filmography ==
=== Film ===
Year	Title	Role	Notes
1996	Jingle All the Way	Toy store manager	
2001	The Princess and the Marine	Rent a Preacher	TV movie
2001	My Bonneville	Dad	also associate producer
2003	Something's Gotta Give	Actor in cast photo	as Lew Dauber
2005	The Island	Tour group man	as Lew Dauber

=== Television ===
Year	Title	Role	Episode	Notes
1983	The Fall Guy	Chip	"Eight Ball"	
1984	AfterMASH	Harry	"Odds and Ends"	
1984	The Fall Guy	Murray	"Bite of the Wasp"	
1984	The Fall Guy	Murray	"October the 31st"	
1984	The Fall Guy	Charlie	"Always Say Always"	
1984	Knots Landing	Thomas	"Uncharted Territory"	
1985	Crazy Like a Fox	Clerk	"Fox Hunt"	
1985	Misfits of Science	Man with Children	"Guess What's Coming to Dinner"	
1985	Knots Landing	Coroner	"Until Parted by Death"	
1985	The A-Team	Designer	"Uncle Buckle-Up"	as Lewis Dawber
1986	The Twilight Zone	Lou Calderon	"Monsters!"	
1986	The Facts of Life	Floyd Barton	"The Wedding Day"	
1987	Newhart	Tourist #1	"Laugh at My Wife, Please"	
1987	Falcon Crest	Landlord	"A Piece of Work"	deleted scene
1988	Valerie	Waiter	"Teacher's Pet"	
1988	Max Headroom	Blank Teacher	"Lessons"	
1990	Matlock	Roger Chapman	"The Madam"	
1990	Murder, She Wrote	Duke of Nonesuch	"The Great Twain Robbery"	
1991	Who's the Boss?	Rev. Markham	"Let Her Tell You 'Bout the Birds and the Bees"	
1991	Dangerous Women	Minister		
1991	Mathnet	Airline Captain	"Despair in Monterey Bay"	
1991	Sisters	First Person	"Some Tuesday in July"	
1992	Jake and the Fatman	Tourist	"Since I Fell for You"	
1992	Seinfeld	Doorman	"The Watch"	
1992	Quantum Leap	Reporter	"Killin' Time - June 18, 1958"	
1993	Sisters	Ed Farrell	"Some Other Time"	
1993	Days of Our Lives	Frank	"Episode #1.7060"	as Lew Dauber
1993	Danger Theatre	Todd Lewiston	"Aloha, Rich Man, Goodbye"	
1995	Family Matters	Minister Barnes	"Wedding Bell Blues"	
1996	Weird Science	Friar	"Lisa's Childhood Memories"	
1996	Married... with Children	Sketch Artist	"Kelly's Gotta Habit"	
1996	Dangerous Minds	Mickey Callender	"Bad Apple"	
1997	Beverly Hills, 90210	Mr. Burnett	"Face-Off"	
1997	Melrose Place	Minister	"Who's Afraid of Amanda Woodward?: Part 2"	
1997	Meego	Santa	"I Won't Be Home for Christmas"	
1997	USA High	Minister Gilbert	"Goodbye, Mr. Phipps"	
1998	Diagnosis Murder	Pastor McSwaine	"Till Death Do Us Part"	
1998	Ally McBeal	Foreman	"You Never Can Tell"	
1998	USA High	Justice	"From Russia with Love"	
1999	USA High	Minister	"The Wedding"	
2001	JAG	Man	"Jagathon"	
2002	24	Bob Jorgensen	"6:00 p.m.-7:00 p.m."	as Lew Dauber
2004	Judging Amy	Judge	"Christenings"	as Lew Dauber
2004	NYPD Blue	Dather Dwyer	"Peeler? I Hardly Knew Her"	as Lew Dauber
2005	The Suite Life of Zack & Cody	The Reverend	"Grounded on the 23rd Floor"	as Louis Dauber
2005	Clubhouse	Priest	"Road Trip"	as Lew Dauber
2005	Over There	Congressman	"It's Alright Ma, I'm Only Bleeding"	as Lew Dauber
2005	The Bernie Mac Show	Priest	"Father Knows Best"	as Lew Dauber
2008	Back to You	Priest	"Cradle to Grave"	as Lew Dauber
2009	Scrubs	Mr. Vaughn	"My New Role"	as Lew Dauber
2011	Rules of Engagement	Speaker	"Audrey is Dumb"	as Lew Dauber
2012	Workaholics	Passenger	"Real Time"	as Lew Dauber
2013	New Girl	Old Sub	"Winston's Birthday"	as Lew Dauber
2014	The League	Priest	"When Rafi Met Randy"	
2017	Lethal Weapon	Gary	"Brotherly Love"	as Lew Dauber
