= The Second Half =

American sitcom

- Genre: Sitcom
- Created by: Leo Benvenuti; Steve Rudnick; John Mendoza
- Starring: John Mendoza; Jessica Lundy; Joe Guzaldo; Ellen Blain; Brooke Stanley; Patrick Bristow; Wayne Knight
- Composer: Robben Ford
- Country of origin: United States
- Original language: English
- No. of seasons: 1
- No. of episodes: 15 (list of episodes)

Production
- Executive producers: Leo Benvenuti; Steve Rudnick; John Mendoza; Glenn Padnick; Martin Shafer; John DeBellis
- Producer: Larry Spencer
- Camera setup: Multi-camera
- Running time: 30 minutes
- Production company: Castle Rock Entertainment

Original release
- Network: NBC
- Release: September 7, 1993 – April 12, 1994

The Second Half is an American sitcom television series created by Leo Benvenuti, Steve Rudnick and John Mendoza, that aired on NBC from September 7, 1993 to April 12, 1994. The series was executive-produced and co-created by its star, John Mendoza.

== Premise ==
A divorced sports columnist for The Chicago Daily Post has to deal with his ex-wife, weekend visits from his two daughters and romance in the '90s. John's column was called The Second Half.

== Cast ==
- John Mendoza as John Palmaro
- Jessica Lundy as Denise Palmaro
- Joe Guzaldo as David Keller
- Ellen Blain as Cathy Palmaro
- Brooke Stanley as Ruth Palmaro
- Patrick Bristow as Walter
- Wayne Knight as Robert Piccolo
- Mindy Cohn as Maureen Tucker

== Episodes ==
No.	Title	Directed by	Written by	Original release date	Prod. code	Viewers (millions)
1	"Pilot"	Barnet Kellman	Leo Benvenuti, Steve Rudnick and John Mendoza	September 7, 1993	090106	15.2
John's ex-wife has to remind him that he is getting a weekend visit from his daughters.
2	"Coughin' Up Meat"	Arlene Sanford	Unknown	September 14, 1993	090103	12.0
A co-worker saves John's life.
3	"Prelude to a Job"	Arlene Sanford	Leo Benvenuti and Steve Rudnick	September 21, 1993	090102	12.1
John's assistant becomes romantically involved with Robert.
4	"Guess Who's Channeling Dinner?"	Arlene Sanford	Tom Seeley and Norm Gunzenhauser	September 28, 1993	090104	10.7
John thinks his new relationship is moving too fast.
5	"Like Father, Like John"	John Fortenberry	Lester Lewis	October 5, 1993	090105	11.1
David tries to improve his relationship with his dad.
6	"Same Bet Next Year"	John Fortenberry	Unknown	October 12, 1993	090107	12.7
John becomes attracted to an old friend. A dry cleaner loses Robert's new pants.
7	"Halloween"	Arlene Sanford	Unknown	October 26, 1993	090108	10.5
John takes Cathy to a Halloween party.
8	"Mr. Television"	John Rich	Leo Benvenuti and John Mendoza	November 2, 1993	090109	9.8
John misses his daughter's recital when he hosts a sports TV show.
9	"Winter Wonderlandlord"	John Rich	Alexa Junge	November 23, 1993	090111	14.9
John becomes the new president of the tenants association.
10	"It's My Party"	John Rich	Leo Benvenuti, Steve Rudnick and John Mendoza	December 7, 1993	090112	9.5
John's daughters invite some friends over.
11	"The Gym"	John Rich	Leo Benvenuti and Steve Rudnick	December 14, 1993	090110	8.7
Robert thinks he is losing his hair.
12	"Far and Awry"	John Rich	Unknown	March 22, 1994	090116	8.8
John plans a mountain trip for spring break for his daughters.
13	"High Nooner"	John Rich	Unknown	March 29, 1994	090113	9.2
John has a meeting with his ex-wife.
14	"One Flu Over a Nest of Cuckoos"	John Rich	Unknown	April 5, 1994	090115	8.5
John cancels a trip to a golf tournament because Cathy has the flu.
15	"10"	John Rich	Unknown	April 12, 1994	090114	8.1
Ruth has her 10th-birthday party.
