= Uncle Leo =

Fictional character on the TV show Seinfeld

- Uncle Leo after his eyebrows have been singed off in "The Package"
- First appearance: The Pony Remark (1991)
- Last appearance: The Finale Part II (1998)
- Created by: Jerry Seinfeld and Larry David
- Portrayed by: Len Lesser

In-universe information
- Occupation: Retired
- Spouse: Stella (separated/widowed)
- Significant other: Lydia
- Children: Jeffrey (son)
- Relatives: Helen Seinfeld (sister); Nana (mother); Jerry Seinfeld (nephew); Unnamed niece

Uncle Leo is a fictional character portrayed by Len Lesser in the American sitcom Seinfeld. Uncle Leo is the fictional uncle of Jerry Seinfeld's character. Uncle Leo made his debut in the second-season episode "The Pony Remark" and appeared in at least one episode in each of the subsequent seasons through the show's nine-season run.

On the 25th anniversary of the show's debut, Rolling Stone ranked Uncle Leo as number six on its list of "100 Best Seinfeld Characters," behind only Newman at number five and the four main characters: Jerry, Kramer, Elaine, and George.

== Description ==
Uncle Leo is the brother of Jerry's mother, Helen; his last name is never revealed. In an episode where Leo signs for a package addressed to Jerry, he actually signs it "Uncle Leo". In "The Bookstore", Jerry mentions "Leo" to Kramer. Kramer is initially confused, but upon remembering, he says, "Oh, yeah. Right. Uncle Leo. Forgot his first name."

Uncle Leo is very eccentric and a "general kvetch." When coming across Jerry, he always exclaims his catchphrase, "Jerry! Hello!" with his arms wide open. When Jerry has a Cape Fear-esque nightmare about him in "The Bookstore," Leo has the word "Jerry" tattooed on the fingers of his right hand and "Hello" on the fingers of his left.

When talking to people, Uncle Leo has a tendency to grab the person's arm (often uncomfortably) and hold them close. In "The Pony Remark," Jerry guesses that he does this "because so many people have left in the middle of his conversation."

Uncle Leo often brags about his son (Jerry's cousin Jeffrey, who never appears on the show) and his various accomplishments while working in the Parks Department. Leo is very sensitive about greetings; when Jerry once avoided stopping to talk to his uncle on the street (because Jerry was on his way to a meeting), Leo was offended and called Jerry's mother in Florida to complain about the snub.

Leo is retired. His wife, Stella, is seen in the third-season episode "The Pen", but by the seventh season, he is either widowed or divorced. In "The Shower Head", he is living with a woman named Lydia. He breaks up with her because Jerry joked on The Tonight Show with Jay Leno about Leo's paranoid obsession with antisemitism in ridiculous contexts, such as claiming that a cook is antisemitic for overcooking his hamburger. Lydia found Jerry's comments funny, so Uncle Leo accused her of being an anti-Semite, as well. He resumes the relationship later on in the episode, although neither Stella nor Lydia is mentioned in subsequent episodes.

In "The Package", Leo receives a package for Jerry after Jerry refuses it, being suspicious that it could contain a bomb. Although initially refusing George's suggestion to let Leo open the package, he encourages Leo to open it after Leo asks Jerry to accompany him to Jeffrey's Parks Department production of The Mikado. This happens over the phone, and Jerry hears a loud explosion once Leo agrees to open the box. Except for having his eyebrows and moustache burnt off, Leo is unharmed. Elaine later quickly draws new eyebrows on him with her eyeliner, leaving him with a comical expression of anger.

In "The Bookstore", Jerry catches Uncle Leo in the act of shoplifting at a local bookstore, thereafter, confronting him about it. Leo maintains that seniors have the upper hand since they can claim senility ("Come on! I'm an old man. I'm confused! I thought I paid for it. What’s my name? Will you take me home?"); he also reminds Jerry to always greet him "Hello" no matter how awkward the situation. Jerry later unintentionally gets Leo arrested by "bookstore police" after Leo attempts yet another theft. The episode reveals that Uncle Leo has a criminal record related to a "crime of passion".

Uncle Leo's final appearance happens in the series finale, "The Finale". He first appears, like many of the supporting characters returning, departing the four's trial. He is seen in the audience reacting to the four's actions, and is last seen comforting a crying Babs Kramer. In a deleted scene, he introduces himself to Babs.

"He's the kind of guy who is a total nuisance at times and the kind of guy you avoid. He's a very expansive character, and that has an attraction to it," Lesser said of the character in 1998.

== Character legacy ==
Len Lesser, who portrayed Uncle Leo, exhibited some of the same character traits, especially the overly excited greetings, when he portrayed the character Garvin from 1996 to 2004 on Everybody Loves Raymond.

Lesser died in 2011. His role as Uncle Leo was remembered as an "iconic" and "scene-stealing" character. Despite his persona as a complaining braggart, Uncle Leo "still managed to be loveable".

== Appearances ==
The Uncle Leo character appears in a total of 15 episodes from 1991 to 1998.

Season Two

- "The Pony Remark"

Season Three

- "The Pen"

Season Four

- "The Ticket"
- "The Wallet"
- "The Watch"

Season Five

- "The Glasses"
- "The Wife"

Season Six

- "The Pledge Drive"
- "The Kiss Hello"
- "The Doodle"

Season Seven

- "The Shower Head"

Season Eight

- "The Package"

Season Nine

- "The Bookstore"
- "The Finale Part I"
- "The Finale Part II"
