= Over My Dead Body (TV series) =

American police crime drama

- Genre: Police procedural Crime drama
- Created by: William Link; David Chisholm
- Starring: Edward Woodward; Jessica Lundy
- Country of origin: United States
- Original language: English
- No. of seasons: 1
- No. of episodes: 12 (1 unaired)

Production
- Running time: 60 minutes
- Production company: Universal Television

Original release
- Network: CBS
- Release: October 26, 1990 – June 20, 1991

Over My Dead Body is an American police crime drama which was aired on the CBS television network from October 26, 1990, to June 20, 1991, as part of its 1990 fall lineup on Friday night at 9:00 p.m. Eastern time.

== Premise ==
Over My Dead Body stars Edward Woodward as Maxwell Beckett, an aging mystery novelist whose three successful early novels were starting to be overshadowed by the reputation his two most recent works had developed as being "bombs." He was approached by young, struggling reporter Nikki Page (Jessica Lundy) who wrote for the San Francisco Union, and who came to him for help after witnessing a murder through her window and because he was her favorite author. After they solved this mystery, they became fast friends and began to work together in the "amateur sleuth" tradition to solve crimes.

== Production ==
Over My Dead Body was produced by William Link, the man responsible for Murder, She Wrote, but while it shared the theme of an aging mystery writer as an amateur sleuth in real life, it shared none of the earlier program's success. It was cancelled after a run of less than three months, although a few leftover episodes were aired in June 1991.

== Cast ==
- Edward Woodward as Maxwell Beckett
- Jessica Lundy as Nikki Page

== Episodes ==
No.	Title	Directed by	Written by	Original release date
1	"Pilot"	Bradford May	Story by : William Link & David Chisholm; Teleplay by : David Chisholm	October 26, 1990
2	"Pilot"	Bradford May	Story by : William Link & David Chisholm; Teleplay by : David Chisholm	October 26, 1990
3	"No Ifs, Ands or Butlers"	Bradford May	Richard C. Okie	November 2, 1990
4	"Dad and Buried"	Bruce Seth Green	Mark A. Burley	November 9, 1990
A boy named Chris (Scott Curtis) steals Maxwell's car, hoping to get his attention and to get his help to find his missing dad.
5	"Obits and Pieces"	James Quinn	Scott Shepherd and Steven C. Smith & Sylvia Stoddard	November 16, 1990
6	"If Looks Could Kill"	Richard Compton	Story by : Tom Sawyer; Teleplay by : Robin Bernheim	November 23, 1990
7	"Dead Air"	Bradford May	Peter M. Tilden	November 30, 1990
8	"A Passing Inspection"	Bradford May	Scott Shepherd	December 7, 1990
9	"Carrie Christmas and a Nappie New Year"	Timothy Bond	Walter Brough	December 21, 1990
10	"Naked Brunch"	Charles Correll	Jim McGrath	June 6, 1991
11	"An Actor Prepares"	Janet Greek	Story by : Violet Pullbrook; Teleplay by : Jim McGrath	June 20, 1991
12	"Separation Is Murder"	Noel Black	Robin Bernheim	UNAIRED
