= Mobile Mail-Screening Station =

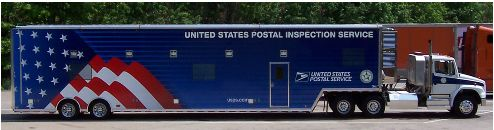
A USPS Mobile Mail-Screening Station (2007)

A Mobile Mail-Screening Station is a highly specialized, self-propelled facility designed to screen mail for the presence of explosive devices and to deter people from sending chemical, biological, radiological and nuclear weapons through the mail, specifically to certain special events. Mobile Mail-Screening Stations are operated by the United States Postal Inspection Service.

== Description ==
The Mobile Mail-Screening Station was designed by the United States Postal Services' Technical Services Division. Each unit is a 53-foot (16 m) tractor and trailer combination containing eight compartmentalized areas that house specialized mail screening equipment. This includes: the GID-3 ambient air monitoring system for the detection of industrial toxins and chemical warfare agents, the HI-SCAN 7555i X-ray Inspection System to scan packages and letters for the presence of improvised explosive devices (IEDs), Smiths Detection HazMatID for the identification of "unknown powders, liquids, pastes and gels" and the SABRE FR air filtration table for the detection of toxic industrial chemicals.

A fully deployed Mobile Mail-Screening Station is operated by a staff of five to eight people.

== History ==
The first deployment of a Mobile Mail-Screening Station was to the Global Initiative to Combat Nuclear Terrorism Conference in Miami, Florida in 2007. Since that time, other deployments have included the Super Bowl, the G20 Summit, and the Democratic National Convention and Republican National Convention. In 2010, at the request of the Canadian government, a Mobile Mail-Screening Station was deployed to Vancouver, British Columbia, Canada from January 25 to March 19, 2010 to screen mail destined for 2010 Winter Olympics sites for the presence of "chemical biological, radiological, nuclear or explosive" threats.

During domestic deployments, Mobile Mail-Screening Stations typically form part of the inter-agency contingent assigned to a United States Department of Homeland Security Special Events Working Group, which is formed to secure national security special events.
