= Jessica Lundy =

American actress (born 1966)

- Born: Jessica R. Lundy; March 20, 1966 (age 60); San Diego, California, U.S.
- Occupation: Actress
- Years active: 1988–present

Jessica R. Lundy (born March 20, 1966) is an American actress. She began her career appearing in films Bright Lights, Big City (1988), Caddyshack II (1988) and Madhouse (1990), before regular roles in the short-lived police drama Over My Dead Body (1990–91) and six-episode revival of The Carol Burnett Show (1991). She starred in the NBC sitcom Hope & Gloria from 1995 to 1996, and in the comedy films The Stupids (1996) and RocketMan (1997). From 2015 to 2019, Lundy starred as Amanda Wainwright in the CBS crime drama series, The Inspectors.

== Early life and education ==
Lundy grew up in Avon, Connecticut. Lundy has a younger sister, Judy.

Lundy attended the Circle in the Square Theatre School. She graduated with a Bachelor of Arts in 1987 at the Tisch School of the Arts of New York University, where she majored in drama and performing arts. Lundy moved to Los Angeles in 1990.

== Career ==
Lundy made her film debut with Bright Lights, Big City (1988). That same year, she appeared in Caddyshack II (1988). Lundy also appeared opposite John Larroquette in the 1990 film Madhouse. Lundy auditioned for the role of Elaine Benes on Seinfeld. From 1990 to 1991, Lundy appeared opposite Edward Woodward in the short-lived CBS police drama series Over My Dead Body. In 1991, she was regular cast member in the six-episode revival of The Carol Burnett Show. She appeared as Joel Fleishman's fiancée/ex-fiancée Elaine Shulman on the drama series Northern Exposure in 1990 and 1992. She also appeared in The Golden Girls and Seinfeld and had a recurring role on Baby Talk.

Lundy has also performed in theater. In 1994, Lundy portrayed Rita Altabel in an Off-Broadway production of Uncommon Women and Others. From 1993 to 1994 she starred in the short-lived NBC sitcom The Second Half. From 1995 to 1996, Lundy played the title role of Gloria in the NBC sitcom Hope and Gloria. The show was canceled after two seasons and 35 episodes.

In 1996, Lundy starred opposite Tom Arnold in the comedy film The Stupids based on The Stupids, characters from a series of books written by Harry Allard and illustrated by James Marshall. It received negative reviews and was box-office bomb, though the film's director, John Landis, considers this one of his favorites. The following year she had two female lead roles: in the Italian comedy film The Good Bad Guy and science fiction comedy RocketMan produced by Walt Disney Pictures. In 1998, she had supporting role in the drama film, Denial. The following years, Lundy played supporting roles on both film and television, notable guest-starring on Dharma & Greg, Monk, The Game, Criminal Minds, Two and a Half Men and Major Crimes.

From 2015 to 2019, Lundy portrayed Inspector Amanda Wainwright in the CBS educational series, The Inspectors. In 2016, she won a Daytime Emmy Award for Outstanding Performer in Children's Programming for her performance on The Inspectors.

== Filmography ==
Year	Title	Role	Notes
1988	Bright Lights, Big City	Theresa	
1988	Vampire's Kiss	Sharon	
1988	Caddyshack II	Kate Hartounian	
1989	B.L. Stryker	Michelle	Episode: "Blind Chess"
1990	Madhouse	Bernice	
1990–1991	Over My Dead Body	Nikki Page	11 episodes
1990–1991	Northern Exposure	Elaine Shulman	Episode: "Russian Flu"; Episode: "Roots"
1991	The Fanelli Boys	Lauren Shaw	Episode: "The Wedding: Part 1"; Episode: "The Wedding: Part 2"
1991–1992	Baby Talk	Susan Davis	7 episodes
1992	Doogie Howser, M.D.	Sheila Davidson	Episode: "What You See Ain't Necessarily What You Get"
1992	The Golden Girls	Janet Devereaux	Episode: "Home Again, Rose: Part 1"; Episode: "Home Again, Rose: Part 2"
1992	Single White Female	Talkative Applicant	
1992	Dream On	Stephanie	Episode: "What Women Want"
1992	Seinfeld	Naomi	Episode: "The Watch"; Episode: "The Bubble Boy"
1992–1994	Dinosaurs	Various (voice)	8 episodes
1993	The Last Shot	Rachel Tullis	TV short
1993	TriBeCa	Nina	Episode: "The Hopeless Romantic"
1993–1994	The Second Half	Denise Palmaro	15 episodes
1994	I Love Trouble	Flight Attendant #1	
1995–1996	Hope and Gloria	Gloria Utz	35 episodes
1996	The Outer Limits	Theresa McPhee	Episode: "Vanishing Act"
1996	The Stupids	Joan Stupid	
1997	The Good Bad Guy	Carol Graham	
1997	RocketMan	Julie Ford	
1997	Party of Five	Nina Rondstadt	5 episodes
1998	Denial	Bonnie	
1998	Cupid	Kate	Episode: "The Linguist"
1998	Just a Little Harmless Sex	Terrianne	
1998	October 22	Liz	
1998	Dharma & Greg	Patty	Episode: "The House That Dharma Built"
1999	It's Like, You Know...	Dawn	Episode: "Arthur 2: On the Rocks"
1999	Wasteland	Felicia	Episode: "Double Date"
2000	Snoops	Abby	Episode: "Swan Chant"
2001	Some of My Best Friends	Meryl Doogan	8 episodes
2002	What I Like About You	Marcy	Episode: "The Teddy Bear"
2002	Boomtown	Vivian Colson	Episode: "The Squeeze"
2003	Titletown		TV movie
2003	Without a Trace	Dr. Covington	Episode: "Clare de Lune"
2003	Lost at Home	Julie Barton	Episode: "Best Friends"
2004	Monk	Rachel Sweeney	Episode: "Mr. Monk Gets Married"
2004	Sweden, Ohio	Actor	TV movie
2004	Century City	Bertha Wood	Episode: "To Know Her"
2004	Missing	Susan Bordner La Belle	Episode: "Resurrection"
2006	A Merry Little Christmas	Noelle	
2007	'Til Death	Barbara	Episode: "The Hockey Lie"
2007	Medium	Lisa Wolfe / Sandra O'Bannon	Episode: "The One Behind the Wheel"
2007	The Game	Penny	Episode: "The Big Chill"
2007	Saving Grace	Belle Grady	Episode: "Bring It On, Earl"
2007	Pushing Daisies	Hillary Hundin	Episode: "Bitches"
2008	3 Days Gone	Det. Kelsey	Video
2009	Fudgy Wudgy Fudge Face	Sour Lemon Drop	
2009	Numb3rs	Carolyn White	Episode: "Where Credit's Due"
2009	Men of a Certain Age	Brenda Blye	Episode: "The New Guy"
2010	90210	Sandra Mathison	Episode: "How Much Is That Liam in the Window"
2011	Criminal Minds	Alison Sparks	Episode: "Coda"
2011	Castle	Myrna Ramsey	Episode: "Eye Of The Beholder"
2012	Of Two Minds	Madeleine	TV movie
2013	Two and a Half Men	Allie	Episode: "Another Night With Neil Diamond"
2015–2019	The Inspectors	Amanda Wainwright	Series lead
2021	B Positive	Charlene	Episode: "Recessive Gina"
2022	A Cloud So High	Dolores White	
2026	Ted	Arlene Goldbaum	Episode: "Mrs. Robicheck"
