= Oldfield baronets =

Extinct baronetcy in the Baronetage of England

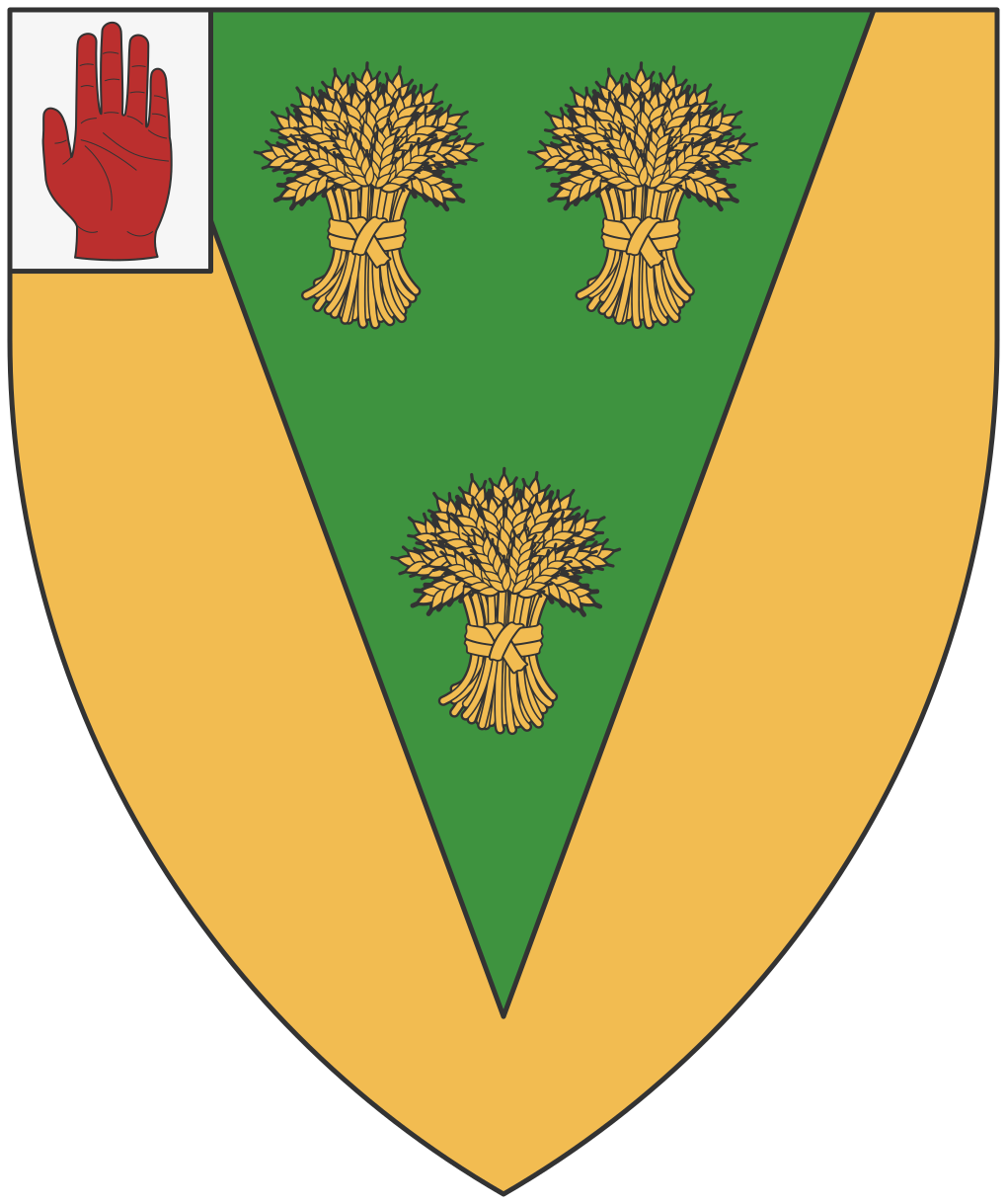
The coat of arms of the Oldfield baronets.

The Oldfield Baronetcy, of Spalding in the County of Lincoln, was a title in the Baronetage of England. It was created on 6 August 1660 for Anthony Oldfield, High Sheriff of Lincolnshire. The title became extinct on the death of the second Baronet in 1705.

== Oldfield baronets, of Spalding (1660) ==
- Sir Anthony Oldfield, 1st Baronet (1626–1668)
- Sir John Oldfield, 2nd Baronet (1659–1705)
