= John Frank Oldfield =

American undercover Postal Inspector

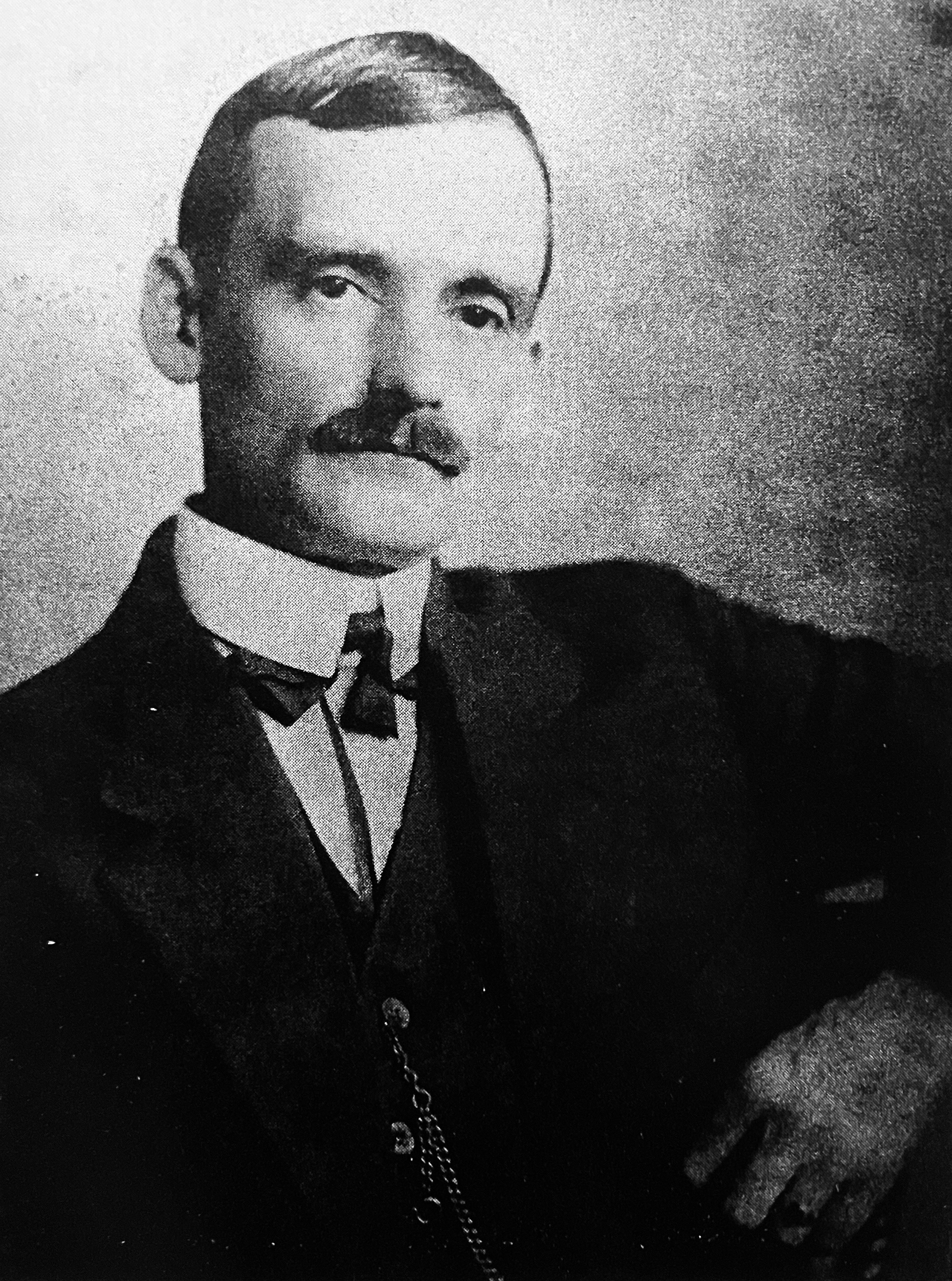

Postal Inspector #156
- In office March 7, 1899 – 15 November 1911
- Appointed by: United States Postmaster General James Albert Gary

Sheriff of Howard County, Maryland
- In office August, 1896 – 1899
- Appointed by: Governor Lloyd Lowndes Jr.

Personal details
- Born: January 2, 1867 Ellicott City, Maryland
- Died: May 25, 1916 (aged 49)
- Spouse: Margaret Galena Oldfield
- Children: William Hamilton; Robert Fulton; John Frank, Jr.; Harry Edward "Gist"; Barney Oldfield
- Parent: Hamilton Oldfield
- Nickname: Frank Oldfield

John Frank Oldfield, who went by the name "Frank Oldfield," was an early law enforcement pioneer in undercover investigations. He was one of the most famous investigators in the country, whose exploits were covered intensively by newspapers of the day. He has been called "the central Ohio version of Elliot Ness." He was a United States Postal Inspector who, working alongside other inspectors, the US Marshals, and the Pinkertons, infiltrated an American branch of the Italian-based Black Hand Society, called the "Society of the Bananas," at the turn of the 20th Century.

The infiltration lead to the arrests of the gang members; Sam Lima, Giuseppe Ignoffo, Sererio Ventola, Sebastian Lima, Salvatore Arrigo, Vincenzo Argio, Francesco Spadaro, Augustino Marfisi, Pippino Galbo, Orazio Runfola, Cologero Viccario, Salvatore Rizzo, and Salvatore Demma.

State's Attorney William Louis Day prosecuted in the trial against this criminal enterprise. By 1911, eleven of these men were sent to prison, making this one of the first organized criminal convictions in American history.

On 15 November 1911, Oldfield tendered his resignation and went into business as a private detective, investigating high-profile white collar crime.

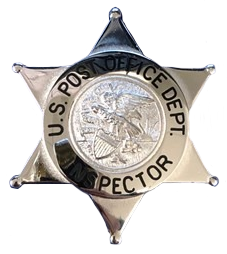
United States Postal Inspection Service, Postal Inspector Badge (1900)

Oldfield died in 1916.

== Society of the Bananas letters and documents used as evidence ==
- "Extortion Letter to Fabio Sebastiano," April 1909.
- "Extortion Letter to DeCamilli," 3 April 1909
- "Extortion Letter to Fassones," 29 September 1908
- "Threat Letter to John Amicom," 1909
- "Threat Letter to John Amicom (Count Yourself)," 20 January 1909
- "Extortion Letter from to Gatto," April 3, 1909.
- Lima, Salvatore (Sam). "Bylaws and Regulations of the Society of Bananas (Translated from the Original Italian)," March 9, 1909.
