= The Little Kicks =

- Seinfeld episode
- Episode no.: Season 8 Episode 4
- Directed by: Andy Ackerman
- Written by: Spike Feresten
- Production code: 804
- Original air date: October 10, 1996

Guest appearances
- Jerry Stiller as Frank Costanza; Neil Giuntoli as Brody; Rebecca McFarland as Anna; Joe Urla as Dugan; Tim O'Hare as Vendor

Episode chronology
← Previous "The Bizarro Jerry"	Next → "The Package"
- Seinfeld season 8

"The Little Kicks" is the 138th episode of the American television sitcom Seinfeld. This was the fourth episode for the eighth season, originally broadcast on the NBC network on October 10, 1996. In this episode, Jerry inadvertently becomes a renowned maker of bootleg films when he takes Kramer to a sneak preview of an unreleased film. The episode is best known for its scenes exhibiting Elaine's bad dancing.

== Plot ==
George tags along to a company party held by Elaine. He attempts to flirt with Anna, one of Elaine's employees, but she isn't interested. The guests are horrified when they see Elaine dance, losing respect for her. Elaine attributes this loss of respect to George's presence at the party. She advises Anna to keep away from George, which causes Anna to think of George as a "bad boy", making him desirable to her.

Jerry gets tickets to a sneak preview of Death Blow for himself, Kramer, and Kramer's friend, Brody. In the theater, Brody starts videotaping the movie to make a bootleg. Brody later becomes sick from eating too much candy and has Kramer take him home, directing Jerry at gunpoint to finish making the tape. Jerry reluctantly bootlegs the movie and worries about breaking the law. However, when he sees the finished product, Brody says it's beautiful and Jerry is "a genius". He assigns Jerry an "arty film" called Cry, Cry Again. Opposed to bootlegging but afraid of turning Brody down, Jerry has Kramer ghost-film it for him. However, when Jerry learns Death Blow has become a bootleg legend, he becomes unwilling to let Kramer's shoddy work go out under his name. He demands they reshoot Cry, Cry Again using three cameramen with headsets. When Brody won't agree to Jerry's outlandish demands, Jerry quits the project.

Kramer, seeing Elaine dancing, informs her that she stinks. Jerry reluctantly confirms this, and suggests she watch herself for proof. She videotapes herself over the ending of the bootleg copy of Cry, Cry Again. When Brody comes to pick up the tape, Jerry and Kramer resort to giving him the copy Kramer recorded, which Elaine has recorded her dancing over.

Elaine, realizing that her dancing was the cause of her staff's disrespect, apologizes to George and tells Anna he is a good person, which makes him undesirable to Anna. George takes up bootlegging in an effort to restore his "bad boy" image, but gets arrested and cries when a policeman yells at him, permanently shaming himself in Anna's eyes. Frank comes to bail him out but instead gets into a physical confrontation with Elaine after she insults George.

Elaine says the bad air at the office has mostly cleared up. Everyone on the sidewalk dances behind her back, mocking her dance that they saw at the end of the Cry, Cry Again bootleg.

== Production ==
The episode was written by Spike Feresten. The cold open was based on an internal monologue Feresten had while walking down the street, worrying about what dangers could befall him.

George's exclamation "Sweet fancy Moses!" was added by Jeff Schaffer, while Jerry's line "That's why they get guns, too many misunderstandings" and the idea of George ironing his pants when Anna asks what he's doing were both contributed by Jerry Seinfeld himself.

=== Elaine's dance ===
Elaine's bad dancing was inspired by a former boss of Feresten's who would dance with little kicks. Though the script stipulated that Elaine's dance would include little kicks, Julia Louis-Dreyfus had to develop the choreography herself. Initially the production crew tried playing the music while filming Elaine's dance, but Louis-Dreyfus found it too difficult to stay out-of-synch with the beat, so they went with the more common practice of filming the scenes without music and adding "Shining Star" by Earth, Wind & Fire in post-production.
