= The Pen =

- Seinfeld episode
- Episode no.: Season 3 Episode 3
- Directed by: Tom Cherones
- Written by: Larry David
- Production code: 305
- Original air date: October 2, 1991

Guest appearances
- Barney Martin as Morty Seinfeld; Liz Sheridan as Helen Seinfeld; Sandy Baron as Jack Klompus; Ann Morgan Guilbert as Evelyn; Len Lesser as Uncle Leo; Annie Korzen as Doris Klompus; Magda Harout as Aunt Stella; Roger Nolan as Chiropractor; Tucker Smallwood as Photographer

Episode chronology
← Previous "The Truth"	Next → "The Dog"
- Seinfeld season 3

"The Pen" is the 20th episode of Seinfeld, the third episode of the third season which first aired on NBC on October 2, 1991.

This is the only episode in which the character of George Costanza does not appear and one of two episodes in which Kramer does not appear (the other being "The Chinese Restaurant"). Additionally, this episode is the first appearance of Morty's rival Jack Klompus and of Uncle Leo's wife (and Jerry's aunt) Stella.

== Plot ==
Jerry and Elaine visit Jerry's parents Morty and Helen in Florida, where they will attend a ceremony honoring Morty as outgoing condo association president of the Seinfelds' retirement community, and go scuba diving. Jerry fends off his parents' insistence on yielding their car and bedroom to them, while covertly explaining why he and Elaine broke up.

Jack Klompus, who will emcee the ceremony, arrives with his wife Doris to settle the check for a group dinner, down to the penny. Jerry admires Jack's astronaut pen, and Jack aggressively pushes the pen on Jerry, who refuses out of courtesy but is happy to accept. The next day, gossip about Jerry taking Jack's much-flaunted pen has spread through the condo, obliging Jerry to return the pen. As a result, Morty explosively confronts Jack over his history of penny-pinching at Morty's expense.

The Seinfelds' uncomfortable sofa bed causes Elaine excruciating back pain after a sleepless night in stifling heat, which Jerry tries to ameliorate by downplaying the length of their stay. Jerry goes diving alone, and returns with eye hemorrhages caused by mask squeeze. At the ceremony that night, Jerry wears sunglasses, while Elaine takes too many muscle relaxants, becoming giddy and disinhibited. They meet Jerry's Uncle Leo and his wife Stella, causing Elaine to spontaneously holler her name, imitating Marlon Brando in A Streetcar Named Desire. Jack, emceeing, viciously roasts Morty's tenure and competence. Morty is provoked into a tussle where he breaks Jack's dental plate. Jerry tries to distract the crowd with comedy, but the assembled retirees fail to appreciate his jokes.

A chiropractor advises Elaine against travel for five more days, to her chagrin, and Jerry is forced to stay to share in her predicament. Meanwhile, Morty, also debilitated after using the sofa bed, must contend with a lawsuit from Jack, and condo-board politicking to avoid expulsion from the community.

== Production ==
"The Pen" is the only episode not to feature Jason Alexander as George Costanza. Alexander discovered after the table read that he was not featured in the episode. He asked executive producer Larry David to release him from his contract if he wasn't included in every episode, even with only a couple of lines. He stated that, as he was an experienced Broadway actor, his dream was to win a Tony rather than an Emmy or Oscar. Alexander would later admit that this was caused by insecurity on his part, as he was worried that Louis-Dreyfus's role would cause his own role as George to be diminished over time.
