= The Pitch (Seinfeld) =

- Seinfeld episode
- Episode no.: Season 4 Episode 3
- Directed by: Tom Cherones
- Written by: Larry David
- Production code: 403
- Original air date: September 16, 1992

Guest appearances
- Peter Crombie as ‘Crazy’ Joe Devola; Stephen McHattie as Dr. Reston; Bob Balaban as Russell Dalrymple; Heidi Swedberg as Susan Ross

Episode chronology
← Previous "The Trip"	Next → "The Ticket"
- Seinfeld season 4

"The Pitch" is the 43rd episode of the NBC sitcom Seinfeld. It is the third episode of the fourth season. It aired on September 16, 1992. Its original airing was as part of a one-hour episode, with "The Ticket" as the second half. In this episode, Jerry is invited to pitch a TV show to NBC, and George conceives a "show about nothing", kicking off the main story arc of season 4. Jerry has a run-in with "Crazy" Joe Davola, a writer who needs psychiatric treatment, and draws Davola's wrath upon himself and Kramer.

== Plot ==
At a comedy club, NBC executives invite Jerry to pitch a TV show starring himself. George and Kramer spitball haphazard premises set in a gym class, an antique store, and a circus. Kramer trades a radar detector to Newman for a motorcycle helmet, and invites him and Jerry to a party. Jerry warns that Kramer is making a bad trade, but Kramer lets Newman think he came out on top, while hiding that the detector is broken.

Meanwhile, Elaine is away on a romantic vacation in Europe with a psychiatrist, Dr. Reston.

George and Jerry joke about confusing "seltzer" and "salsa" in a Spanish accent, inspiring George to base Jerry's entire show on random conversations between themselves, Elaine, and Kramer, with no story. Assuming sitcoms have low standards, he joins the pitch as writer. After they reiterate the "show about nothing" repeatedly, Jerry is sold. Kramer opposes being written into the show unless he can play himself.

Kramer is unsympathetic when Newman complains that the defective radar detector got him pulled over for speeding. Newman warns him of karmic retribution.

George becomes cripplingly anxious after arriving at 30 Rockefeller Plaza. Jerry has an unwanted encounter with "Crazy" Joe Davola, a writer who is receiving psychiatric treatment from Reston. Perturbed by Davola's disjointed conversation, Jerry blabs about Kramer's party. Davola is surprised and offended that Kramer did not invite him.

In the meeting, George passes himself off as an off-off-Broadway writer. He boldly launches into pitching his "show about nothing", where "nothing happens", and shuts down Jerry's suggestions otherwise. The executives are skeptical, but George, carried away in defense of his "artistic integrity", walks out. Afterwards, Jerry excoriatingly questions George's sanity, but, even so humbled, George believes he has a chance romantically with one of the executives, Susan Ross.

In an amorous moment with Elaine, Reston's mind drifts to Davola's psychiatric medication. Jerry warns Kramer about Davola, alarming him.

Susan indeed meets up with George, but she does not get to tell Jerry she is supporting the pitch before Kramer, unknowingly drinking Jerry's expired milk, uncontrollably throws up on her. Even so, Jerry holds out hope for the TV deal.

The spiteful Davola surprises Kramer and kicks his head into the ground. Kramer survives thanks to his helmet, but Davola threatens to come after Jerry next.

== Production ==
In syndication, this episode does not feature Jerry's stand-up routine and also uses Season 3's logo at the beginning, as is also the case in "The Ticket", "The Cheever Letters", and "The Virgin". Both this and "The Ticket" were originally broadcast as a one-hour episode, but are shown separately in syndication.

The primary storyline about Jerry and George co-creating the show Jerry was a tongue-in-cheek homage to the process that Jerry Seinfeld and Larry David experienced when co-creating the show Seinfeld. In the Season 4 DVD extra documentary called "The Breakthrough Season", Jason Alexander and Castle Rock Entertainment executive Glenn Padnick discussed their initial skepticism about using this idea in not only one episode but as an arc for an entire season. Alexander found it to be "insane" and "self-aggrandized". Padnick described the arc about the Jerry show as "inside baseball on a show that most people didn't know even existed."

== Critical reception ==
The Pew Charitable Trusts weighed in on this episode, naming telemarketing one of the contributors to "rudeness in America".
