= The Ticket (Seinfeld) =

- Seinfeld episode
- Episode no.: Season 4 Episode 4
- Directed by: Tom Cherones
- Written by: Larry David
- Production code: 404
- Original air date: September 16, 1992

Guest appearances
- Peter Crombie as "Crazy" Joe Devola; Stephen McHattie as Dr. Reston; Bob Balaban as Russell Dalrymple; Heidi Swedberg as Susan Ross; David Graf as Policeman

Episode chronology
← Previous "The Pitch"	Next → "The Wallet"
- Seinfeld season 4

"The Ticket" is the 44th episode of the NBC sitcom Seinfeld. It is the 4th episode of the fourth season. It aired on September 16, 1992 as a one-hour episode with "The Pitch". In this episode, Jerry and George get a chance to salvage their disastrous TV show pitch to NBC, and Kramer must help Newman get out of a speeding ticket while suffering head trauma.

== Plot ==
After getting kicked in the head by "Crazy" Joe Davola, Kramer shows signs of brain damage. He unconsciously fails to dress and shave on the left side, and randomly says "Yo-Yo Ma" or lapses into xenoglossy. Jerry urges him to see a doctor.

George has received the dry-cleaning bill for Kramer throwing up Jerry's expired milk on Susan, and makes everyone chip in even though it is only $18. Jerry and George fear they have lost Susan's support for their TV pitch, but are overjoyed when NBC asks to meet again. George gleefully expects a payout on the level of Ted Danson's income.

As they hurry to NBC headquarters, Jerry's wristwatch—a gift from his parents—runs slow as usual, so he throws it away. They run into Jerry's Uncle Leo, who holds them up with small talk and acts spurned when they tear themselves away. Uncle Leo fishes Jerry's watch out of the trash and keeps it.

Going to court for his speeding ticket, Newman concocts an excuse that he was hurrying to stop Kramer's suicide attempt. Taking credit for his helmet saving Kramer, Newman guilts Kramer into abandoning a doctor's appointment to back him up in court. Kramer agrees to testify that he turned suicidal over a lifelong failure to become a banker, but then fails to play along with Newman's leading questions and forgets his testimony partway through. Newman hysterically rages at Kramer as he is ordered to pay.

At NBC, Jerry and George backpedal and agree to every concession. Thanks to Susan's influence—and forgiving the vomit—the executives offer them a pilot order. George offers her the $18 as a courtesy, but is caught off-guard when she accepts. George is also disappointed when NBC's offer is not on par with what Ted Danson makes.

In Europe, Reston again snaps out of an intimate moment with Elaine to brood over Davola missing his medication. Jerry spots Davola outside a cafe window, cowing him and George into hiding in their booth. Jerry asks a policeman to escort them out, but the policeman is in no hurry as he leisurely dines. They are finally home free by nighttime when Kramer and Newman confirm Davola is gone, but Newman gets a parking ticket and again vows to fight in court.
