= Seinfeld season 3 =

Seinfeld
- Season 3
- DVD cover
- Showrunner: Larry David
- Starring: Jerry Seinfeld; Julia Louis-Dreyfus; Michael Richards; Jason Alexander
- No. of episodes: 23

Release
- Original network: NBC
- Original release: September 18, 1991 – May 6, 1992

Season chronology
- ← Previous; Season 2 Next → Season 4

The third season of Seinfeld, an American television series created by Jerry Seinfeld and Larry David, began airing on September 18, 1991, on NBC, an American broadcast television network. It comprises 23 episodes and concluded its initial airing on May 6, 1992. "The Tape", "The Pen", and "The Letter" are some of the season's episodes that were inspired by the writers' own experiences. Co-creator Larry David admits that season three was a big turning point for the series in terms of how the show was made; it's where the writers started doing nonlinear story lines with episodes containing multiple stories. George was becoming a bigger liar, Elaine was becoming more quirky, and Kramer was becoming surer of himself throughout his crazy antics. This season received eight Emmy nominations and one Directors Guild of America Award.

The DVD boxset for season three was released by Sony Pictures Home Entertainment in Region 1 on November 23, 2004, twelve years after it had completed broadcast on television. It was also released in Region 2 on November 1, 2004, and on October 18, 2004, in Region 4. As well as every episode from the season (minus "The Stranded" which was produced for the second season), the DVD release features bonus material including deleted scenes, exclusive stand-up material, and commentaries.

== Production ==
Seinfeld was produced by Castle Rock Entertainment and aired on NBC in the United States. The executive producers were Larry David, George Shapiro, and Howard West with Tom Gammill and Max Pross as supervising producers. Bruce Kirschbaum was the executive consultant. Tom Cherones was the main director for this season; however, some of the episodes were directed by David Steinberg, Joshua White, and Jason Alexander. This season was written by Larry David, Jerry Seinfeld, Larry Charles, Peter Mehlman, Elaine Pope, Tom Leopold, Bob Shaw, Don McEnery, Bill Masters, and Greg Daniels.

The series was set predominantly in an apartment block on New York City's Upper West Side; however, the third season was shot and mostly in filmed CBS Studio Center in Studio City, California. The show features Jerry Seinfeld as himself, Jason Alexander as George Costanza, Julia Louis-Dreyfus as Elaine Benes, and Michael Richards as Kramer. Due to Julia Louis-Dreyfus's off-screen pregnancy, her character had to spend the latter half of this season hiding her belly behind furniture and laundry baskets. Siobhan Fallon Hogan was originally asked to reprise her role as Tina later in this season, but was performing as a cast member on season 17 of Saturday Night Live and had to refuse. Harris Shore played the role of Mr. Lippman in "The Library"; however, Richard Fancy took over the role for the remainder of the series. The Babu Bhatt character was originally scripted under the name of Vong Sim, but was later changed.

=== Story line inspirations ===
A number of the season's episodes were inspired by the writers' own experiences. "The Pen" was partly inspired by a sofa bed owned by Jerry Seinfeld's mother Betty. During stays, Seinfeld would put the couch cushions on the floor and sleep on them there to avoid the uncomfortable mattress. The Chinese baldness cure that George tries in "The Tape" is based on something Larry David tried while living in New York. Also, the shots Kramer takes of George's scalp in this episode are identical to those the real Kenny Kramer took of Larry David. Elaine's story in "The Letter" was inspired by Larry David's experience attending an Angels – Yankees game in Anaheim, California. While seated as a guest in Gene Autry's box, David was asked to remove the hat. David could be seen wearing the hat on the front page of the Los Angeles Times sports section the following day. Mr. West is also named after Howard West, one of the show's executive producers, who provided Larry David with a connection to the seats in the owners' box.

=== Theme song ===
The season premiere, "The Note", is the only episode (other than the original pilot) with a different version of the theme song, which included female back-up singers harmonizing over the iconic slap-bass tune. The singers were added by composer Jonathan Wolff at the request of Jerry Seinfeld, who wanted to add "a little sparkle" to the music, suggesting the addition of some scat lyrics. Seinfeld and executive producer Larry David both liked Wolff's additions, and three episodes were produced with the new style music. However, they had neglected to inform NBC and Castle Rock of the change, and when the season premiere aired, they were surprised and unimpressed, and requested that they return to the original style. The subsequent two episodes were redone, leaving "The Note" as the only episode with the additional music elements.

== Reception ==
=== Critical response ===
The review aggregator website Rotten Tomatoes reported a 100% approval rating with an average rating of 8.9/10, based on 14 critic reviews. The website's critics consensus reads, "Seinfeld comes fully into its own as a divine comedy of petty grievances in a third season that mines wicked wit from the painfully awkward."

=== Awards ===
Season three received eight Emmy nominations, two of which were won. Elaine Pope and Larry Charles won "Primetime Emmy Award for Outstanding Writing in a Comedy Series" for "The Fix-Up". Janet Ashikaga also won for "Outstanding Individual Achievement in Editing for a Series", for the episode "The Subway." Jerry Seinfeld was nominated for "Outstanding Lead Actor in a Comedy Series" for the special one-hour episode "The Boyfriend/New Friend," losing to Craig T. Nelson for his portrayal of Hayden Fox on the ABC sitcom Coach and Jason Alexander was nominated for "Outstanding Supporting Actor in a Comedy Series", losing to Michael Jeter in the CBS comedy Evening Shade. The series was also nominated for "Outstanding Comedy Series" for this season, which was won by Murphy Brown, then in its fourth season. The series would be nominated in that category for the remaining six seasons, winning only once, in the next season. There were also two other Emmy nominations for the "Outstanding Writing in a Comedy Series" category, with Larry David, Bob Shaw, and Don McEnery for "The Tape", and Larry David for "The Parking Garage". David Steinberg was nominated for a Directors Guild of America Award for "Outstanding Directorial Achievement in Comedy Series" for "The Tape".

== Episodes ==
No. overall	No. in season	Title	Directed by	Written by	Original release date	Prod. code	US viewers (millions)
18	1	"The Note"	Tom Cherones	Larry David	September 18, 1991	301	21.7
Jerry tells George and Elaine that insurance would cover his physical therapist massages if he got a fraudulent doctor's note from his dentist, Roy. George gets a massage from a handsome male masseur, but is paranoid that he may have felt sexual pleasure, and questions his own sexuality. Roy (Ralph Bruneau) writes fraudulent notes for all three of them, and ends up investigated for insurance fraud. The group doubts Kramer when he vividly describes a sighting of Joe DiMaggio dunking a donut.
19	2	"The Truth"	David Steinberg	Elaine Pope	September 25, 1991	302	16.7
George breaks up with his accountant girlfriend Patrice (Valerie Mahaffey) over her highbrow artistic whims. Patrice demands the truth from him, and his brutal honesty drives her to check into a depression clinic. Having forgotten that Jerry was relying on him to secure Patrice's help with a tax audit, George leaves Jerry's tax records with Patrice and must grudgingly reconcile with her to recover the papers. Kramer, dating Elaine's roommate, Tina (Siobhan Fallon), creates many unwelcome impositions at Elaine's apartment.
20	3	"The Pen"	Tom Cherones	Larry David	October 2, 1991	305	15.1
Jerry and Elaine visit Jerry's parents in Florida, where Morty is being honored by his condo association. Jerry meets the emcee, Jack Klompus, and admires his astronaut pen. Jerry relents to Jack's pressure to accept the pen, but is obliged to return it when scandalous gossip spreads. Elaine suffers from the stifling heat, and excruciating back pain caused by an uncomfortable sofa bed, leaving Jerry to go scuba diving alone and receive barotrauma. All this, and Morty's confrontation with Jack over his history of penny-pinching, results in a fiasco at the ceremony.
21	4	"The Dog"	Tom Cherones	Larry David	October 9, 1991	303	17.2
Jerry is unwillingly recruited to care for a fellow plane passenger's beloved dog, which turns out to be unruly and noisy. Jerry's cleanliness complex compels him to scrupulously poop bag rather than let the dog defecate in his apartment, repeatedly foiling his group movie plans as either Jerry or Elaine drops out to attend to the dog. With Elaine saving the movie to watch with Jerry, George is forced to make awkward conversation with her instead. Kramer's eagerness to break up with his girlfriend causes Jerry and Elaine to prematurely reveal their criticism of her.
22	5	"The Library"	Joshua White	Larry Charles	October 16, 1991	304	16.4
Jerry receives a 20-year library fine for failing to return Tropic of Cancer in 1971. Adamant that he returned the book with then-classmate Sherry Becker, he fails to plead his case when the hard-nosed "library investigation officer", Lt. Bookman, pegs him as a miscreant. George recognizes a homeless man as his bullying high school physical education teacher, Mr. Heyman, and wonders if he ruined Heyman's life by getting him fired. Kramer strikes up a romance with a librarian, while Elaine, fearing for her job at Pendant Publishing, tries to placate her boss with literary finds.
23	6	"The Parking Garage"	Tom Cherones	Larry David	October 30, 1991	306	17.0
The group is stranded in a shopping mall parking garage as they search for Kramer's car. Fearing for her new goldfish's welfare, Elaine pleads to hitch rides with bystanders to search for the car, but their apathy drives her to aggravation. George dreads the consequences of failing to return in time to chaperone his parents for their wedding anniversary, but their search is further hindered when Jerry is caught peeing by a security guard, and Kramer cannot find where he stowed his new air conditioner. In 1997, TV Guide ranked this episode #33 on its list of the 100 Greatest Episodes.
24	7	"The Café"	Tom Cherones	Tom Leopold	November 6, 1991	307	16.4
George agrees to take an IQ test for his girlfriend's research, but, insecure about his intelligence, cheats by having Elaine—who boasts of a high IQ—take the test for him. Jerry becomes patronizingly concerned for the hapless proprietor of a new restaurant across the street. Jerry ego-trips off being lavished with praise for visiting the empty restaurant, while Elaine, visiting to take the test in peace, suffers many distractions that result in humiliation for both George and herself. Kramer is hounded by his mother's ex-boyfriend as he refuses to give up a jacket the ex-boyfriend left two years ago.
25	8	"The Tape"	David Steinberg	Larry David and Bob Shaw & Don McEnery	November 13, 1991	308	15.8
Jerry is surprised and titillated by an unidentified woman's voice sexually propositioning into a tape recorder he set up at his comedy act. Elaine confides in George that she recorded the voice to prank Jerry into believing someone in the audience was lusting after him. This secret knowledge of Elaine's lascivious side leaves George uncontrollably aroused. After jumping through hoops to order a Chinese baldness cure, George is torn between putting on the foul-smelling cream for his own sake, and taking it off for Elaine's. Kramer indulgently films everyone after getting a free camcorder.
26	9	"The Nose Job"	Tom Cherones	Peter Mehlman	November 20, 1991	309	16.3
George cannot look past his loving girlfriend Audrey (Susan Diol)'s conspicuously large nose. When Kramer tactlessly suggests a nose job, George uses this as cover to encourage her, but, when the surgery collapses Audrey's nose, he is horrified and unsympathetic. Jerry hooks up with a beautiful woman, Isabel (Tawny Kitaen), and becomes both intellectually repulsed and carnally addicted at the same time. Kramer enlists Elaine's help to reclaim the jacket that he relinquished to his mother's ex-boyfriend.
27	10	"The Stranded"	Tom Cherones	Larry David & Jerry Seinfeld and Matt Goldman	November 27, 1991	209	18.6
George brings Jerry and Elaine along to a party on Long Island. A friendly coworker propositions to George, and Jerry, following man-to-man protocol, consents to George stranding him and Elaine at the party. The host, Steve, accommodates them waiting late for a ride, and Jerry gratefully invites Steve to drop by. Steve takes up the offer without warning, and abuses Jerry's hospitality by drunkenly fraternizing and calling an escort service. George ends up struggling with his workplace romance, while deciding to take his claim of being shortchanged at a drugstore into his own hands.
28	11	"The Alternate Side"	Tom Cherones	Larry David and Bill Masters	December 4, 1991	310	18.0
Jerry's car is stolen after Sid, who re-parks cars on their alternate side parking street, is distracted by Woody Allen shooting a movie. George takes over for Sid in his absence but becomes overwhelmed as he struggles to corral cars. Elaine's 66-year-old boyfriend falls unconscious, thwarting her plan to break up with him, and emergency paramedics and the movie shoot alike are held up by George's chaotic parking. Kramer receives a speaking line in the movie, "These pretzels are making me thirsty", which everyone finds relatable amidst each of their predicaments.
29	12	"The Red Dot"	Tom Cherones	Larry David	December 11, 1991	311	17.9
At a party at Pendant Publishing, Elaine brings George to her boss to fill a job opening, while Jerry lets Elaine's boyfriend Dick, a recovering alcoholic, accidentally take a drink. Obligated to thank Elaine, George buys her a heavily discounted cashmere sweater, feigning ignorance about a manufacturing defect, a small red dot. At work, George has drunken sex with a cleaner, but this allows her to gain leverage over him. As Elaine fears, Dick relapses to drink and loses his job, becoming vindictive. George fails to fob off the sweater on anyone, getting his comeuppance each time.
30	13	"The Subway"	Tom Cherones	Larry Charles	January 8, 1992	313	18.7
One morning, everyone sets out on the subway. George, dressed up for a job interview, passes himself off as successful, and abandons his plans, to impress an attractive woman (Barbara Stock). Elaine is due at a lesbian wedding as the best man, but ends up stuck on a fully-packed and stopped train. Jerry, failing to tempt anyone to join him on a rare trip to Coney Island to reclaim his car, ends up bonding with an overweight nudist (Ernie Sabella). Kramer overhears an insider tip for a racehorse bet, winning a hefty payout that attracts unsavory attention.
31	14	"The Pez Dispenser"	Tom Cherones	Larry David	January 15, 1992	314	19.2
George frets that he cannot gain the upper hand over his pianist girlfriend Noel. He brings Jerry and Elaine to a recital, but Jerry creates a disturbance by cracking up Elaine with a Pez dispenser. With their relationship strained by the laughter, George preemptively breaks up with Noel to finally gain the "hand" he coveted. Jerry hosts an intervention for a fellow comedian's drug addiction, and suspects that his life went astray after causing a fatal Gatorade shower. Kramer dreams up a cologne inspired by smelling of the beach after polar bear swims.
32	15	"The Suicide"	Tom Cherones	Tom Leopold	January 29, 1992	312	16.9
Jerry is intimidated by his possessive neighbor, Martin, for talking to his girlfriend Gina. Gina dumps Martin and drives him to attempt suicide, then brazenly pursues Jerry while mocking his fear of the comatose Martin. George consults a psychic, but ends up immensely paranoid over an interrupted warning about his Cayman Islands trip. Gina and Jerry are spotted together by Newman, and Jerry must buy his silence. After fasting 72 hours for an ulcer test, Elaine is delirious from hunger as she continues to wait at the hospital.
33	16	"The Fix-Up"	Tom Cherones	Elaine Pope & Larry Charles	February 5, 1992	317	18.5
George abandons all hope of meeting women while Elaine's friend, Cynthia, contemplates dating a desperate man. Jerry and Elaine are reluctant to set them up, but defensively pressure each other into doing so. Thanks to free condom handouts from Kramer, George has sex with Cynthia on the first date, only to be warned that the condoms were defective. George is kept on edge over Cynthia not calling back, unaware that she has missed a period.
34	17	"The Boyfriend"	Tom Cherones	Larry David and Larry Levin	February 12, 1992	315	17.0
35	18	"The Boyfriend"	Tom Cherones	Larry David and Larry Levin	February 12, 1992	316	17.0
Jerry hits it off with retired professional baseball player Keith Hernandez. Jerry gives Hernandez his number, but becomes anxious over Hernandez not calling, frets over "coming on too strong", and becomes jealous when Hernandez goes out with Elaine. George, who has failed to apply for jobs while collecting unemployment benefits, desperately inveigles the Department of Labor agent reviewing his extension request. Kramer and Newman hold a grudge against Hernandez for supposedly spitting on both of them, but Jerry espouses a conspiratorial "second spitter" theory. As romance sparks between Hernandez and Elaine, Jerry gets cold feet about agreeing to help Hernandez move while hardly knowing him. In 1997, TV Guide ranked this episode #4 on its list of the 100 Greatest Episodes.
36	19	"The Limo"	Tom Cherones	Story by : Marc Jaffe; Teleplay by : Larry Charles	February 26, 1992	318	19.5
Stranded at the airport, George and Jerry use fake names to score a chauffeured limousine ride waiting for a passenger named "O'Brien", and find themselves en route to Madison Square Garden with tickets for the Knicks–Bulls game. They exuberantly invite Elaine and Kramer, but George realizes that he has taken credit for leadership of a neo-Nazi group when two of O'Brien's militantly loyal adherents join them in the limo. As the limousine heads to a planned speech by O'Brien, heavily picketed by protesters, George and Jerry are forced to play along while furtively plotting their escape.
37	20	"The Good Samaritan"	Jason Alexander	Peter Mehlman	March 4, 1992	319	16.1
Jerry witnesses a hit-and-run on a parked car. The driver, Angela, turns out to be an attractive woman, so he goes out with her, but falsely boasts to Elaine that he courageously confronted the perpetrator. At dinner with Elaine's married friend, Robin, George responds to Robin's sneeze with "God bless you" in her husband's place, unwittingly rousing longstanding marital tensions. Kramer repeatedly goes into seizures whenever Entertainment Tonight comes on TV. Jerry learns that the hit-and-run victim was a neighborhood woman he pines after, but fails to sway Angela to turn over a new leaf.
38	21	"The Letter"	Tom Cherones	Larry David	March 25, 1992	320	22.3
Jerry is dating Nina (Catherine Keener), an artist who is jealous of Elaine still being close to him. Despite not understanding art, George succumbs to pressure to buy a painting from Nina, not realizing that it costs $500. The group gets box seat tickets for Yankee Stadium, and Elaine attends after giving her boss a fake excuse, but an altercation gets her photo printed in the paper incriminatingly. Jerry breaks up with Nina over her possessiveness, but he is touched when Nina leaves him a passionate love letter on red stationery. Nina paints a portrait of Kramer, which captivates a socialite couple.
39	22	"The Parking Space"	Tom Cherones	Larry David and Greg Daniels	April 22, 1992	322	17.8
Jerry divulges to Kramer that George and Elaine went to a flea market without him, and Kramer betrays that his friend Mike called Jerry a "phony". Downstairs, after they get Jerry's car rear-ended, George and Elaine return in search of parking. George and Mike each pulls halfway into the same perfect spot, and both refuse to back down. Elaine tells Jerry a sob story to downplay the damage to his car. Jerry, Kramer, and various bystanders all take sides in the unending standoff well into the night, and Jerry and Kramer's indiscretion comes back to bite them both.
40	23	"The Keys"	Tom Cherones	Larry Charles	May 6, 1992	321	16.4
After finding Kramer in his apartment at all hours in unwelcome situations, Jerry confiscates his spare keys from Kramer. Jerry soon takes pity on Kramer, but Kramer refuses with false bravado, citing the "covenant of the keys". Kramer leaves for California to break into show business, vowing to free himself from Jerry's hospitality, but Newman divulges that Kramer really left out of resentment. Jerry, George, and Elaine all reshuffle custody of their spare keys, but Jerry ends up locked out of his apartment with Elaine and his spare keys nowhere to be found. Kramer has many hitchhiking misadventures on his journey to Los Angeles.
