= The Parking Space =

- Seinfeld episode
- Episode no.: Season 3 Episode 22
- Directed by: Tom Cherones
- Written by: Larry David and Greg Daniels
- Production code: 322
- Original air date: April 22, 1992

Guest appearances
- Lee Arenberg as Mike; Wayne Knight as Newman; Maryedith Burrell as Mother; Shannon Cochran as Sheila; Michael Costanza as Truck Driver; Mik Scriba as Cop #1; Stan Sellers as Cop #2; John Christian Graas as Matthew; Peggy Lane as Bystander; Larry David as Boxing Announcer (voice, uncredited)

Episode chronology
| ← Previous "The Letter" | Next → "The Keys" |
- Seinfeld season 3

"The Parking Space" is the 39th episode of the sitcom Seinfeld. The episode was the 22nd episode of the third season. It aired on NBC on April 22, 1992. In this episode, George and Kramer's friend Mike get locked in an unending standoff over the same parking space. The story of the parking confrontation was inspired by a similar incident that happened to writer Greg Daniels' father.

== Plot ==
Kramer badgers Jerry over why his car is missing again, and Jerry makes him beg before divulging that George and Elaine drove it to a flea market, without inviting Kramer. With his friend Mike coming over to watch a boxing match, Kramer betrays that they talked behind Jerry's back, forcing Jerry to beg before divulging that Mike called him a "phony".

George drives back with a new hat, lamenting that he will disappoint women by inevitably taking it off. Elaine turns the rearview to herself, causing George to swerve and get rear-ended. Back at Jerry's building, George insists on street parking, claiming his entire family is constitutionally unable to pay for garage parking. A perfect parking space is open, but George dawdles to flaunt his supposed parallel parking talents, and half-backs into the space just as Mike, arriving, pulls half in forward.

George and Mike argue whether George ceded the space, or Mike muscled in. With neither backing down, George makes Elaine confess the damage to Jerry. Elaine swigs strong Scotch so she can make up a tall tale about a wild car chase to escape lawless, gun-toting teenagers in a "souped-up" convertible, seemingly eliciting Jerry's sympathy.

George is irked that Mike is on good terms with both Jerry and Kramer, who get called down to intervene. The standoff draws a crowd, with everyone taking different sides. Kramer recriminates against George and Elaine for not inviting him, and George blames Jerry for his indiscretion.

A truck driver demands to get through, so impartial third parties move the cars to make way—then put them back in place, continuing the standoff. Despite Elaine being pleased with her elaborate sob story, Jerry figures out George's guilt for the damage. Sid, the neighborhood car parker, assumes George's parking has caused another fiasco. Jerry indiscreetly surprises a neighborhood boy with the news that his father's store is closing.

The standoff continues into the night, as Newman argues that forward parallel parking stands for societal collapse. A woman sympathizes with George, but he drives her away by being too desperate to keep his hat on. Even two passing policemen fail to break up the standoff when they take opposite sides.

At Elaine's urging, Jerry settles the score with Mike over being called "phony", freeing himself, out of everyone, from the unending standoff. However, when he gets upstairs, the match is over.
