= The Subway (Seinfeld) =

- Seinfeld episode
- Episode no.: Season 3 Episode 13
- Directed by: Tom Cherones
- Written by: Larry Charles
- Production code: 313
- Original air date: January 8, 1992

Guest appearances
- Ernie Sabella as Naked Man; Barbara Stock as Scam Woman

Episode chronology
← Previous "The Red Dot"	Next → "The Pez Dispenser"
- Seinfeld season 3

"The Subway" is the 30th episode of the sitcom Seinfeld. It is the 13th episode of the show's third season. It aired on NBC on January 8, 1992.

The episode was written by Larry Charles and was directed by Tom Cherones.

== Plot ==
At Monk's, the four discuss their plans for the day before setting out for the subway: George is dressed up for a job interview, Elaine is due at a lesbian wedding as the best man, Kramer must pay tickets for many traffic violations, and Jerry is taking a rare trip to Coney Island, where his stolen car (Note: As previously mentioned in The Alternate Side.) was found and impounded. Jerry fails to tempt the others to come with him to Coney before they all part ways.

George's well-dressed appearance catches an attractive woman's attention, and he passes himself off as a successful stock trader to impress her. He abandons his interview to go with her to a hotel room, where she disrobes and handcuffs him to the bed as if to engage in bondage. To his dismay, she robs him, taking his only suit to make up for his paltry cash. An embarrassed George spends the rest of the day wrapped in a bedsheet from the hotel.

An old-fashioned woman judges Elaine for her wedding duties, causing Elaine to loudly disavow lesbianism in self-defense. Later, the fully-packed train stops without explanation, and Elaine suffers in silence while her inner monologue grows ever more frantic and overwrought—as the train loses power, starts moving, then loses power again.

After falling asleep on another passenger's shoulder, Jerry wakes up sitting across from an overweight man who has stripped naked, with the other passengers giving a wide berth. Jerry chides the naked man for his self-conceit, but they eventually bond while arguing the New York Mets' pennant odds. Jerry spends the day enjoying Coney Island with the man, and the impound lot closes before he can claim his car.

After being beaten to open seats and a free newspaper by quicker passengers, Kramer overhears an inside tip from another passenger that an underperforming racehorse is about to "break his maiden". He rushes to an off-track betting parlor and wins a hefty payout on the horse. A menacing stranger at the betting parlor follows Kramer back to the subway, but Kramer is saved when a "blind" violin busker reveals himself as an undercover policeman. Kramer surprises everyone by paying for dinner, that evening back at Monk's.

== Reception ==
In 2012, Paste Magazine named "The Subway" the 16th best episode of the series, citing it as a "great example of how Seinfeld can turn something as everyday and mundane as riding the subway into not one, but four hilarious stories. In 2013, NYC & Company, New York City's official tourism organization, named it the "New Yorkiest" episode of the series.
