= Rhinoplasty (disambiguation) =

Rhinoplasty is a plastic surgery procedure to improve the appearance or function of the nose.

Rhinoplasty may also refer to:

- Rhinoplasty (EP), Primus album
- The Rhinoplasty Society, a nonprofit organization

== See also ==
- "The Nose Job", a season 3 episode of Seinfeld
- "Tom's Rhinoplasty", a season 1 episode of South Park
