= The Keys (Seinfeld) =

- Seinfeld episode
- Episode no.: Season 3 Episode 23
- Directed by: Tom Cherones
- Written by: Larry Charles
- Production code: 321
- Original air date: May 6, 1992

Guest appearances
- Candice Bergen as herself playing Murphy Brown; Eric Allan Kramer as Biker

Episode chronology
← Previous "The Parking Space"	Next → "The Trip"
- Seinfeld season 3

"The Keys" is the 40th episode of the sitcom Seinfeld. It is the 23rd, and final, episode of the third season and the first of a three-episode story arc. It first aired on NBC on May 6, 1992. In this episode, Jerry takes back his spare keys from Kramer, straining their friendship. Candice Bergen guest stars as herself, playing the title character from Murphy Brown (as she did in real life) in a TV episode within a TV episode. This episode ended on a cliffhanger that would later be resolved in "The Trip", the two-part premiere episode of the show's fourth season.

== Plot ==
Jerry finds Kramer in his apartment borrowing things in the middle of the night; taking a bath unannounced; and with a woman just as Jerry returns with his flirtatious date. Fed up, Jerry confiscates his spare keys from Kramer on the spot. Kramer resists, but has no recourse but to rail against Jerry.

Jerry gives his keys to Elaine instead, but they both take pity on Kramer and offer the keys back. Kramer refuses their pity, blaming himself for breaking the "covenant of the keys". He takes back his own ring of numerous spare keys to trade with George. Declaring that he denied his own squalor by living out of Jerry's apartment, Kramer observes how George is likewise wasting his life—as he does not "yearn", and has nothing whatsoever to live for. Inspired by his own dalliance with Woody Allen, Kramer leaves for California to pursue an acting career.

George and Elaine agree to give back each other's keys so that George can trade with Kramer, and Elaine can trade with Jerry. Jerry and George find Kramer gone, and browbeat Newman into admitting that Kramer left out of resentment over Jerry's keys.

Jerry gets locked out of his own apartment, and cannot reach Elaine. Though George still has her keys, he is reluctant to let Jerry search her apartment, and they nearly come to blows. Still, they search together, finding Elaine's spec script for an episode of Murphy Brown. Elaine catches them, and everyone blames each other and demands their keys back. They find that they have all lost track of which keys are whose.

Kramer's car breaks down en route to Los Angeles. He hitchhikes with a biker, who jovially reminisces over a gruesome, near-fatal crash that left him comatose for a year. He then travels in a hippie van, impressing them by insinuating that he has strangled a man, but the emotionally needy hippies will not let him leave. Then, he rides with a woman trucker, but causes a malfunction when she lets him drive. In the end, he arrives, and rollerblades down Venice Beach.

Jerry patronizingly advises Elaine on breaking into show business. On TV, they see Kramer on Murphy Brown as Murphy's new secretary, "Steven Snell".

== Production ==
Larry David and Jerry Seinfeld later appeared on Diane English's (creator of Murphy Brown) new show, Love & War, as a thank you for the Murphy Brown scene. Due to Julia Louis-Dreyfus's off-screen pregnancy, her character had to spend the latter half of this season hiding her belly behind furniture and laundry baskets. "The Keys" was the final episode filmed before the birth of her son and her leave at the start of Season 4.

== Music ==
When Jerry calls Kramer's mother, the music heard in the background is from Pagliacci, which was later featured in the episode "The Opera". The scene that shows Kramer rollerskating in L.A. is accompanied by an instrumental version of The Beach Boys' song "California Girls".
