= The Suicide (Seinfeld) =

- Seinfeld episode
- Episode no.: Season 3 Episode 15
- Directed by: Tom Cherones
- Written by: Tom Leopold
- Production code: 312
- Original air date: January 29, 1992

Guest appearances
- Gina Gallego as Gina; Mimi Lieber as Rula the Psychic; C. E. Grimes as Martin

Episode chronology
← Previous "The Pez Dispenser"	Next → "The Fix-Up"
- Seinfeld season 3

"The Suicide" is the 32nd episode of the sitcom Seinfeld, of which it was the fifteenth episode of the third season. It first aired on NBC on January 29, 1992.

The episode features the first on-screen appearance of Newman, portrayed by Wayne Knight. He had previously been portrayed, in voice only, by Larry David in the seventh episode of the second season, "The Revenge", where, ironically, Newman attempts suicide himself by threatening to jump off the roof of the building.

"The Suicide" features the first of two references George makes to his brother. Like Jerry's sister, mentioned for the first and only time in "The Chinese Restaurant", his sibling is never seen on-screen.

== Plot ==
Elaine, who must fast for 72 hours before an ulcer test, is overeating to prepare. While arguing with George over how much a Drake's Coffee Cake costs, Jerry is intimidated by his neighbor Martin (C.E. Grimes) for consulting Martin's girlfriend Gina (Gina Gallego). George believes he had a dream presaging this encounter, so Elaine suggests that he consult a psychic.

Gina dumps Martin, who attempts suicide by overdose, and becomes hospitalized in a coma. Gina brazenly comes on to Jerry, and mocks him for still fearing the comatose Martin. Kramer, learning about Martin from Newman's gossiping, imagines that coma cases will attract looters, and becomes desperate to get back his vacuum cleaner from Martin.

The psychic impresses George with her intuitions, then begins warning him about a trip he booked to the Cayman Islands. Elaine repeatedly interrupts to lecture the psychic about smoking while pregnant. The psychic kicks them out, leaving George immensely paranoid about possible disasters.

Gina insists, over Jerry's reluctance, on being seen together, and Newman immediately spots them. George and Jerry deliver Elaine to her ulcer test, while Kramer and Newman visit Martin. George offers his ticket to Kramer, while Jerry offers to buy Newman's silence. Newman turns down the Caymans trip, but caves to a Drake's Coffee Cake from Jerry.

George meets the psychic while she is in labor, and desperately tries to coax out her warning as she gives birth. Elaine, still waiting and delirious from hunger, barges in on Newman and steals his coffee cake, just as Martin wakes up. Newman spitefully rats out Jerry, and a brawl breaks out with Martin throttling Jerry while Kramer demands his vacuum.

Kramer's Caymans trip coincides with a Sports Illustrated Swimsuit Issue photo shoot at his hotel, allowing him to befriend the models at a nude beach, and play nude backgammon with Elle Macpherson, in George's place. Incidentally, he gets a mild jellyfish sting, and deduces that this was the warning meant for George. Meanwhile, Gina and Martin have moved in together. Elaine, having spoiled her fast, is forced to start over.
