= The Beard =

- Seinfeld episode
- Episode no.: Season 6 Episode 16
- Directed by: Andy Ackerman
- Written by: Carol Leifer
- Production code: 615
- Original air date: February 9, 1995

Guest appearances
- Robert Mailhouse as Robert; Katherine LaNasa as Sgt. Cathy Tierny; Jon Gries as Homeless Man; Edward Winter as Mr. Stevenson; Joan Scheckel as Denise; John F. O'Donohue as Gus; Jerry Diner as Lou; Mirron E. Willis as Officer #1; Ken Kerman as Officer #2

Episode chronology
← Previous "The Highlights of 100"	Next → "The Kiss Hello"
- Seinfeld season 6

"The Beard" is the 102nd episode of the NBC situation comedy Seinfeld. This is the 16th episode for the sixth season. It aired on February 9, 1995. In this episode, Elaine acts as a gay man's beard, but her pretend affection for him becomes real. The toupéed George declares himself too good for a bald woman, and Jerry must hide from a polygraph test that he watches Melrose Place as a guilty pleasure.

== Plot ==
Still wearing his new toupée, George puts on airs. Elaine cannot take him seriously, but Kramer, deeply impressed, wants to introduce George to Denise, a "gorgeous" woman. Not having seen her in years, Kramer describes Denise to his facial composite artist friend at the police station, producing a stunning sketch that sells George on the hookup. Jerry comes along, and gets the number of an attractive officer, Sgt. Tierny.

Kramer saves leftover Chinese food in a Tupperware container to give to a homeless man. Though grateful, the man will not return Kramer's container after finishing.

Elaine gets to see Swan Lake at the Metropolitan Opera for free, by acting as a beard for Robert, a gay banker. Putting on their act in front of Robert's boss, Elaine gushes over Robert's attractive qualities, then spontaneously kisses him. The next day, Elaine has hopelessly fallen for Robert; out of desperation, she imagines that he might switch teams for her.

Kramer now has no Tupperware, but tries to apologize to the homeless man. George, no longer thinking of himself as bald, plans to pass off his toupée as real to Denise. Back at the precinct, Jerry meets Tierny for a date while Kramer gets paid to fill out police lineups. Tierny shows Jerry a polygraph that was once used on a Melrose Place cast member, and Jerry denies watching the show, out of embarrassment. Tierny is skeptical, and decides to test Jerry with the polygraph. Declaring his lie "too stupid to confess", Jerry seeks George's help to bluff the machine.

Denise looks just like the sketch, except that she has gone bald. Outraged, George unabashedly acts too good for her. Elaine delivers his comeuppance by throwing his toupée out a window; the homeless man puts it on. George snaps out of his self-importance and embraces his own and Denise's baldness.

George's only advice for beating the polygraph is through self-deception. The polygraph operator interrogates Jerry over every scandalous twist on Melrose Place; unable to hold back his investment in the drama, Jerry releases a pent-up fanboy rant and storms out. Elaine cajoles Robert into joining her "team", and revels in sex and shopping with him, but, before long, Robert goes back since Elaine has far less experience with male "equipment" than his own "team".

George gets a taste of his own medicine when Denise turns him down. Kramer blames George and Elaine for giving up the toupée, but everyone settles down to watch Melrose Place with Jerry. Later, the homeless man, as witness to a break-in, picks Kramer out of a lineup.

== Production ==
Writer Carol Leifer got the idea for the episode from a date she went on as a beard for a gay friend of hers who was in banking; the date was painfully awkward, but she thought the situation had comedic potential. The idea of Kramer posing in police lineups came from her reading that David Caruso used to do the same thing when he was a struggling actor.

A lot of material was cut due to time constraints. Jerry and Elaine's meal was to evolve into a chopsticks contest; after Elaine announces she is making her move to convert Robert to heterosexuality, Jerry was to promise to brutally mock her if she fails; and after George tells him "It's not a lie if you believe it," Jerry was to practice this teaching by telling a man it is 2:30 when the clock says it is 4:15, with George nodding in silent approval. In addition, the scene where the lineup participants are told to turn left and then turn right was scripted to end with Kramer singing "The Hokey Pokey", but the show's producers were unable to secure the rights to the song.
