= The Pez Dispenser =

- Seinfeld episode
- Episode no.: Season 3 Episode 14
- Directed by: Tom Cherones
- Written by: Jerry Seinfeld and Larry David
- Production code: 314
- Original air date: January 15, 1992

Guest appearances
- Elizabeth Morehead as Noel; Fred Sanders as John

Episode chronology
← Previous "The Subway"	Next → "The Suicide"
- Seinfeld season 3

"The Pez Dispenser" is the 31st episode of the sitcom Seinfeld. The episode was the fourteenth episode of the show's third season. It aired on NBC on January 15, 1992. The episode was written by Jerry Seinfeld and Larry David and was directed by Tom Cherones.

== Plot ==
Despite enjoying the company of his pianist girlfriend Noel, George frets that he cannot gain the upper hand in their relationship. In a bid to "get some hand", he plans to introduce her to Jerry and Elaine after a piano recital. Jerry brings along a Tweety Bird Pez dispenser from Kramer, and stands it up on Elaine's leg at the recital.

Cracking up uncontrollably, Elaine hurries out, and runs into John, who she knows from Jerry's comedy club. Learning that another comedian, Richie, has become a drug addict, Elaine suggests an intervention, and ropes in Jerry on John's insistence. Jerry suspects that Richie went astray when, celebrating a win by their comedy club softball team one winter, Kramer goaded Richie into giving the elderly club owner a Gatorade shower—causing him to catch pneumonia and die.

George has Elaine play innocent to Noel to save face for him, but Noel is inconsolable over the traumatizing laughter. The resulting tension convinces George that she will break up with him, so, at Kramer's suggestion, he breaks up preemptively to turn the tables. Taken aback, Noel capitulates to George's demand that she think about him "all the time".

Kramer, having joined a polar bear club, becomes fond of smelling of the beach after a swim. He dreams up a beach-scented cologne, so Jerry introduces him to Steve, a Calvin Klein marketer—who shoots down the idea as idiotic.

Richie's friends convene at Jerry's apartment for the intervention, but Kramer also arrives with the polar bear club, and George, boasting of his ample "hand", arrives with Noel. One of the swimmers makes Elaine laugh, and Noel recognizes the sound. Outraged at George's duplicity, she leaves him.

Richie is hostile upon arriving, but Jerry's Pez dispenser helps him cope with a traumatic childhood memory of having his Pez dispenser destroyed in a car crash. Mollified, Richie enters rehab, while becoming addicted to Pez.

== Cultural references ==
George raves about Noel playing the Waldstein. Ludwig van Beethoven composed his "Waldstein Sonata" in 1803 and dedicated it to Count Ferdinand Ernst Gabriel von Waldstein.

Noel plays Beethoven's Piano Sonata No. 8 at the concert when Elaine leaves laughing. The same piece is played in a very similar scene in George Cukor's Gaslight.

Marty Benson's death from pneumonia after having a bucket of Gatorade dumped on him is a reference to the death of Hall of Fame football coach George Allen in 1990, 44 days after being doused by a celebratory Gatorade shower.
