= The Fix-Up =

- Seinfeld episode
- Episode no.: Season 3 Episode 16
- Directed by: Tom Cherones
- Written by: Larry Charles & Elaine Pope
- Production code: 317
- Original air date: February 5, 1992

Guest appearance
- Maggie Wheeler as Cynthia

Episode chronology
← Previous "The Suicide"	Next → "The Boyfriend"
- Seinfeld season 3

"The Fix-Up" is the 33rd episode of the sitcom Seinfeld. It is the 16th episode of the show's third season. It aired on NBC on February 5, 1992. The episode won the award for Outstanding Writing for a Comedy Series at the 1992 Emmy Awards for Larry Charles and Elaine Pope, the writers of the episode.

== Plot ==
Jerry has dinner with George, who eats slouched while talking, chews with his mouth open, and messily slurps. Elaine has dinner with a friend, Cynthia. George despairs at ever meeting a woman and abandons all hope, while Cynthia, bitter over "good" and "mediocre" men alike, contemplates dating an utterly desperate man.

Comparing notes, Jerry and Elaine consider fixing up George and Cynthia. They immediately think better of it, but both turn defensive over the other's reluctance. They pressure each other into setting up the date, and agree to exchange all inside information they get.

George demands impossibly specific details about Cynthia's looks, while Cynthia is briefed on George's unemployment, girth, and baldness. Nevertheless, they agree to meet. Kramer hands out a bag of free condoms from his friend Bob Sacamano's workplace, and George accepts one, just in case. On their date, George and Cynthia have sex—in George's kitchen, to cope with his anxiety—and swear each other to secrecy. Jerry and Elaine both find out, but play dumb with each other.

George is on edge over Cynthia not calling back, but forcibly stops Jerry from intervening. Kramer warns George that the free condoms were defective, while Elaine learns that Cynthia has missed a period. Jerry and Elaine blame each other. Kramer stops George and Jerry fighting over Cynthia, assuming they are in a love triangle; George assails Kramer over the condoms, forcing Jerry to step in; and Kramer stops Jerry and Elaine's fight, assuming they are having a lovers' tiff.

George overhears about Cynthia's missed period. Elated over achieving fatherhood, he pledges his full support for Cynthia's autonomy and welfare, winning her over. Cynthia's missed period turns out to be a false alarm. Later, at dinner, Cynthia witnesses George's eating habits in dismay.
