= The Limo (Seinfeld) =

- Seinfeld episode
- Episode no.: Season 3 Episode 19
- Directed by: Tom Cherones
- Story by: Marc Jaffe
- Teleplay by: Larry Charles
- Production code: 318
- Original air date: February 26, 1992

Guest appearances
- Peter Krause as Tim; Suzanne Snyder as Eva; Harley Venton as Dan; Jodi Baskerville as herself; Jeremy Roberts as Limo Driver; Norman Brenner as Man at Airport

Episode chronology
← Previous "The Boyfriend"	Next → "The Good Samaritan"
- Seinfeld season 3

"The Limo" is the 19th episode of the third season of the American sitcom Seinfeld (the 36th episode overall). It aired on NBC on February 26, 1992.

== Plot ==
George's car breaks down just as he arrives at the airport to pick up Jerry. Both now stranded, they notice a limousine chauffeur waiting for a passenger called O'Brien. Since Jerry saw someone named O'Brien missing the overbooked flight, George passes himself off as O'Brien. They bluff their way into the limousine, which is headed to Madison Square Garden with four tickets for that night's Knicks–Bulls game.

Exhilarated over their score, Jerry invites Elaine and Kramer to share in the ill-begotten tickets, and lets them in on their fake names. The driver picks up two passengers, giving George and Jerry no chance to bail out. The pair, Tim and Eva, identify themselves as adherents of O'Brien—who has never publicly shown his face—and eagerly anticipate his planned speech that night.

Reading the speech, George realizes that he has taken credit for a white supremacist polemic, and that their fellow passengers are Holocaust deniers. When the limousine harmlessly blows a tire, the spooked followers react militantly, revealing a collection of military handguns, while Eva arouses George with her zealous devotion. Meanwhile, a news anchor reports that Donald O'Brien, a neo-Nazi leader and an insurrectionist who has even drawn David Duke's condemnation, is arriving to speak at the Paramount Theater, while a protest mounts to denounce O'Brien.

Kramer, educating Elaine about Michael Jordan, tumbles into a pile of trash while attempting to dunk. Elaine's friend invites her to join the protest, and Kramer connects the dots between O'Brien's name and the limo ride. In confusion, he questions whether Jerry is secretly a neo-Nazi leader, or secretly a CIA agent infiltrating them.

Having pulled his hamstring trying to kick free the tucked covers in a hotel bed, George cannot run away, and also misses his chance to call the police. When they meet up with Elaine and Kramer, angry protesters overhear O'Brien's name, and the group is forced to flee in the limo. Just after Tim demands an explanation from Kramer over his confusion of him calling Jerry O'Brien, Jerry tries to vouch for him. Suddenly, the real O'Brien calls the limo, blowing George's cover. Held at gunpoint by Tim and Eva, the group, except Kramer, frantically babbles confessions and groveling over each other, while protesters close in. As the crowd forcefully rocks the limo, the Nazis kick the group out. George desperately tries to correct the news broadcast identifying him as O'Brien.
