= The Stranded (Seinfeld) =

- Seinfeld episode
- Episode no.: Season 3 Episode 10
- Directed by: Tom Cherones
- Written by: Larry David; Jerry Seinfeld; Matt Goldman
- Production code: 209
- Original air date: November 27, 1991

Guest appearances
- Michael Chiklis as Steve (the party host); Michael Milhoan as Security Guard; Teri Austin as Ava

Episode chronology
← Previous "The Nose Job"	Next → "The Alternate Side"
- Seinfeld season 3

"The Stranded" is the tenth episode of the third season of the American television sitcom Seinfeld (and the 27th episode overall). It first aired on NBC in the United States on November 27, 1991. The episode was originally produced for season two, but was postponed because Larry David was dissatisfied with the episode; it was therefore advertised as a "lost" episode. It was also released in the first and second season set instead of the third.

The episode was written by Larry David, Jerry Seinfeld and Matt Goldman, and directed by Tom Cherones. Besides the usual cast, other actors in the episode include Michael Chiklis, Teri Austin, Bobbi Jo Lathan, Gwen Shepherd, and Marcia Firesten.

== Plot ==
George is going to a party on Long Island, enticed by his friendly coworker, Ava. Jerry sees no need to travel so far to meet women, but, since George is driving, joins in along with Elaine. At the party, George is whisked away, leaving Jerry and Elaine to endure dull conversations.

Ava asks George to "make love to her", putting him under enormous pressure. Though desperate to leave, Jerry, citing an unwritten protocol between men where courtship takes precedence over all obligations, lets George take Ava home, calling Kramer for a backup ride. Seeing Ava's heavy fur coat, Elaine calls her out for animal cruelty, to no avail. Later, George suffers daily anxiety from managing a workplace romance, and decides to quit his job.

Kramer loses the directions to the party and must find his way from memory, leaving Jerry and Elaine awkwardly stranded as the last remaining guests until 2am. Out of gratitude to the host, Steve, for accommodating them despite his wife's impatience, Jerry invites Steve to drop by when in his neighborhood. Riding back, with Kramer's convertible roof stuck open, Jerry and Elaine catch cold from exposure.

Later, Steve visits without notice just as Jerry is headed out. Steve guilts Jerry into letting him wait for a ride in the apartment, and ends up drunkenly fraternizing with Kramer, then calling an escort service. Jerry returns just in time to be left holding the check for Steve's call girl, and then to be arrested for soliciting prostitution. Elaine arrives with soup, and calls out the call girl for wearing fur.

After futilely accusing a drug store cashier of shortchanging him $10, George decides to shoplift some cold medicine for Jerry worth $10, and is also arrested. Later, Jerry and George fondly reminisce about their time in jail.

== Production ==
The episode was originally produced for the second season. Larry David was dissatisfied with the episode and had it shelved until midway through season three. Its initial broadcast included a special introduction by Jerry to explain the continuity error of George still working in the real estate business.
