= The Marine Biologist =

- Seinfeld episode
- Episode no.: Season 5 Episode 14
- Directed by: Tom Cherones
- Written by: Ron Hauge & Charlie Rubin
- Production code: 513
- Original air date: February 10, 1994

Guest appearances
- Wayne Knight as Newman; Carol Kane as Corinne; Richard Fancy as Lippman; George Murdock as Testikov; Rosalind Allen as Diane DeConn; David Blackwood as Hotel Clerk; Heather Morgan as Woman on Bench

Episode chronology
← Previous "The Dinner Party"	Next → "The Pie"
- Seinfeld season 5

"The Marine Biologist" is the 78th episode of the American sitcom Seinfeld. It is the 14th episode of the fifth season. It was originally broadcast on NBC on February 10, 1994. In the episode, Jerry hooks up George with a popular ex-classmate, but George must play along with Jerry's lie that he is a marine biologist, while a renowned Russian author throws Elaine's electronic organizer out of a moving limousine. Jerry Seinfeld considers the episode one of his favorites.

== Plot ==
Jerry sentimentally shows off his beloved T-shirt dubbed "Golden Boy", nearly worn out from the laundry. Elaine is far more excited about Pendant Publishing having her escort Russian author Yuri Testikov—whom she compares to Tolstoy—in a limousine. Jerry tricks Elaine into believing that the lyric "War, what is it good for?" was originally an unpublished title for Tolstoy's War and Peace. George and Jerry read their college alumni magazine, where Jerry, but not George, is mentioned.

Kramer passes a free electronic organizer from his bank on to Elaine. No one takes up Kramer's gung-ho invitation to "have some fun" driving hundreds of Titleist golf balls into the ocean from Rockaway Beach. He later returns utterly disillusioned—having hit only one long drive—and tormented by sand in his clothes.

Jerry runs into Diane, the "it girl" from his class. To save face for George's absence from the alumni magazine, Jerry, inspired by George's enthusiasm for a whale documentary on TV, claims he is now a marine biologist. Jerry hooks up George with Diane, forcing him to play along with the lie. George complains that he is only comfortable living his own lies, such as pretending to be an architect. He plans to come clean, hoping that Diane likes his true self.

In the limousine, Elaine confuses Mr. Lippman and Testikov by confidently retelling Jerry's story. Elaine does not know how to silence her organizer when it starts beeping loudly. Agitated, Testikov throws the organizer out a window. A woman named Corinne gets hit in the head and sent to the hospital. She has no insurance to cover her bill, and also cannot silence the organizer, but tracks down Jerry from the stored contacts. Corinne holds the organizer hostage to demand reimbursement.

Elaine, having thrown out her address book, needs the organizer back, but wants Testikov to pay out of his million-dollar advance from Pendant. Corinne meets her at Testikov's hotel, but gets thrown out for the noisy organizer. Elaine and Jerry meet Testikov and try to get him to confess on tape. Testikov finds and throws their noisy, concealed tape recorder out the window, and onto Corinne's head. Meanwhile, Kramer, still beleaguered by sand, drops his shoe out a window, and onto Newman's head.

On a romantic walk, George and Diane find a beached whale, surrounded by a crowd looking for a marine biologist's help. Everyone rallies around George, forcing him to volunteer to save the whale.

Later, at Monk's, George retells his astounding fish story: by dumb luck, he was washed atop the whale, where he reached into its blowhole and pulled out a golf ball—which he produces to Kramer's sheepishness. Winning Diane's adoration, George came clean to her as planned, and got immediately dumped. Having lost "Golden Boy" to one wash too many, Jerry shows off its heir, "Baby Blue", while George is tormented by sand in his clothes.

== Production ==
George's climactic whale monologue was not in Ron Hauge and Charlie Rubin's original script; it was a rewrite that show creators Larry David and Jerry Seinfeld came up with in a burst of late night inspiration. Because the monologue was written at the last minute, there was no time to rehearse it. Despite this, actor Jason Alexander's delivery on the first take was so satisfying to the show's producers that no further takes were shot. Seinfeld stated that his shocked expression in the scene was not an in-character reaction to the story, but rather him marveling at Alexander's ability to have the speech memorized so quickly.

The production crew wanted to use the animatronic whale from the then-recent film Free Willy for the scene at the beach. Due to miscommunication, the owners of the animatronic whale thought the Seinfeld crew wanted the real whale, and declined the request. The crew resorted to crafting a CGI whale. Larry David was pleased with how real the CGI whale looked, but decided that the scene would be more effective if the whale were kept off-camera.

Sequences which were filmed but deleted prior to broadcast include George giving an in-depth account of his made-up visit to the Galapagos Islands and Newman finding a mentally unhinged Kramer vacuuming non-existent sand.

== Critical reception ==
Rick Kushman of The Sacramento Bee listed this as one of the Top Ten Seinfeld Episodes: a "brilliantly plotted story that weaves together all kinds of silliness".

In 2009, a New Hampshire Union Leader columnist speculated that one could ask "people to name their favorite living marine biologist... and the most likely answer is George Costanza."
