= Elaine Pope =

American film producer and writer

- Born: 1951 or 1952 (age 74–75); Montreal, Quebec, Canada
- Occupations: Writer; film producer
- Relatives: Carole Pope (sister)

Elaine Pope (born 1951 or 1952) is a Canadian writer and film producer. Born in Montreal, Quebec, Pope was writing for CBC Radio by the late 1970s, later writing TV specials for Lily Tomlin, including the 1981 TV special Lily: Sold Out, as well as the ABC-TV live sketch-comedy show Fridays (a rival of Saturday Night Live) and the HBO series Not Necessarily the News.

Pope won an Emmy Award for co-writing the episode "The Fix-Up" for the TV series Seinfeld and was the producer and co-writer for the 2004 remake of Alfie starring Jude Law.

== Personal life ==
Pope's sister is rock singer Carole Pope.
