= The Boyfriend (Seinfeld) =

- Seinfeld episodes
- Episode nos.: Season 3 Episodes 17/18
- Directed by: Tom Cherones
- Written by: Larry David & Larry Levin
- Production code: 315/316
- Original air date: February 12, 1992
- Running time: 42 minutes

Guest appearances
- Keith Hernandez as himself; Wayne Knight as Newman; Carol Ann Susi as Carrie; Roger McDowell as himself; Rae Allen as Ms. Sokol; Lisa Mende as Carol; Stephen Prutting as Michael; Richard Assad as Cab Driver; Melanie Good as Tall Woman

Episode chronology
← Previous "The Fix-Up"	Next → "The Limo"
- Seinfeld season 3

"The Boyfriend" (also known as "The New Friend") is an hour long episode of the sitcom Seinfeld. It makes up the 34th and 35th episodes of the show, and 17th and 18th episodes of the show's third season. It first aired on NBC on February 12, 1992. In the "extras" section of the Season 3 DVD, Jerry Seinfeld says it is his favorite episode. The first extended episode of the series, it was later split into two parts for syndication; the original version can be seen on the season 3 DVD and Netflix.

== Plot ==
=== Part 1 ===
In a locker room, Jerry spots retired professional baseball player Keith Hernandez. George ridicules Jerry for thinking Hernandez might recognize him, but Hernandez does just that, and they exchange mutual admiration. Jerry gives Hernandez his number, then anxiously commiserates with Elaine over men who "don't call".

Afraid of "coming on too strong", Jerry dithers over calling Hernandez, dressing to meet him, and shaking his hand afterwards, and waits for the "right time" to mention his hits during game 6 of the 1986 World Series. Elaine's reality check that "he's a guy" confuses Jerry's feelings further. Hernandez cancels on Jerry to see Elaine instead; Jerry becomes jealous, but does not know whether of Hernandez or Elaine.

Kramer and Newman hold a grudge against Hernandez because, after once costing the Mets a game against the Phillies, he supposedly spit on both of them outside the stadium. Jerry, knowing their story well, conducts a mock-courtroom reconstruction of the scene with a flashback parodying the Zapruder film, convincing Elaine that only an unidentified "second spitter" could have bounced the spit off Kramer to hit Newman.

George is due to apply for an unemployment benefits extension, and must prove to a Department of Labor agent, Mrs. Sokol, that he is job-hunting. Under pressure, George fabricates having interviewed with "Vandelay Industries" for a "latex salesman" job, using Jerry's number as their contact. Frantic to let Jerry in on the con, George runs afoul of police for throwing someone out of a phone booth, and gets thrown out of a cab for his impatience.

Jerry cannot take the latex ruse seriously, but plays along. Kramer, who was not looped in, answers Sokol's call truthfully—ignoring George who, overhearing from the bathroom, barges out and faceplants with his pants down.

=== Part 2 ===
George weasels out of Mrs. Sokol terminating his benefits by flattering her stone-faced daughter Carrie (Carol Ann Susi), and gets set up with her. Carrie is easily won over by being treated to a Big Mac, but still looks down on George and dumps him for being unemployed.

Kramer drags the unenthusiastic Jerry to see their former neighbors' new baby, but Kramer mishandles the baby.

Hernandez regales Elaine with his game 6 feats, then passionately kisses her, dispelling his inner doubt with the reminder "I'm Keith Hernandez". Despite great chemistry between them, because he is a smoker, Elaine breaks up with Hernandez.

Jerry agrees to help Hernandez move, despite not being emotionally ready so soon. Kramer and George take him to task for debasing himself for a man he "hardly knows", and scandalously suggest that he would drive Hernandez to the airport next. George incidentally divulges his life goal: sleeping with a tall woman.

Tasked with disassembling and hauling heavy items down Hernandez's stairs in freezing cold, Jerry gets cold feet and backs out. Kramer and Newman confront Hernandez, but he remembers that relief pitcher Roger McDowell, whom Kramer and Newman had been harassing that day, was the real spitter. Chastened by their mistake, Kramer and Newman help Hernandez move, as he cautions them to handle his things "like a baby".

George earns one last reprieve from Mrs. Sokol by promising to have Hernandez meet her, but he rushes over too late. He calls out to the departing Hernandez in vain, but is delighted when a tall woman arrives to return his dropped wallet.

== Production ==
The "spitting incident" depicted in the story is a parody of the 1991 film JFK. Jerry presents the "magic loogie theory", a reference to the "magic bullet theory" featured in the film. The recount of the incident in the episode resembles the Zapruder film in JFK, as it uses the same color and photography effects. The episode features Wayne Knight (as Newman), who appeared in JFK in the same position as the scene it depicts.

Kramer and Newman claim the incident with Keith Hernandez occurred on June 14, 1987, at Shea Stadium after a game between the Mets and the Philadelphia Phillies. In reality, the Mets defeated the Pittsburgh Pirates 7–3 at Three Rivers Stadium.

In the episode, Elaine seems to have no idea about how Game 6 of the 1986 World Series finished until Keith tells her about it. In the DVD commentary, Julia Louis-Dreyfus admitted that she actually attended the game.

In the original script, the actual spitter was going to be Darryl Strawberry, but due to Strawberry having legal issues at the time of production, Larry David and Jerry Seinfeld believed that it would not look good for Strawberry's image to be portrayed as spitting on fans, so Roger McDowell, a friend of Keith Hernandez, was written in Strawberry's place.

An alternative ending was filmed where the tall woman gives George his wallet, and George thanks her then shows her the door. When she asks George if he wants anything else, George, after a pause, shakes his head "No" and closes the door on her. When Jerry looks at him in disbelief, George shrugs, "Not my type", causing Jerry to roll his eyes in exasperation.

== Reception and legacy ==
TV Guide ranked the episode fourth in their 1997 list of the 100 Greatest TV Episodes of All Time.

On June 23, 2010, Jerry Seinfeld called four innings of a Mets game at Citi Field against the Detroit Tigers on SportsNet New York, reuniting him with Hernandez, now an analyst for SNY. During that time, he revealed that if Hernandez had turned them down they would have asked Gary Carter to take his place.
