= The Nose Job =

- Seinfeld episode
- Episode no.: Season 3 Episode 9
- Directed by: Tom Cherones
- Written by: Peter Mehlman
- Production code: 309
- Original air date: November 20, 1991

Guest appearances
- Susan Diol as Audrey; Tawny Kitaen as Isabel; Roy Brocksmith as Landlord

Episode chronology
← Previous "The Tape"	Next → "The Stranded"
- Seinfeld season 3

"The Nose Job" is the 26th episode of Seinfeld. It is the ninth episode of the show's third season. It first aired on NBC on November 20, 1991. The episode was written by Peter Mehlman and was directed by Tom Cherones.

== Plot ==
George is unable to look past his loving girlfriend Audrey's conspicuously large nose, despite knowing that she would be out of his league if not for this. While George is too ashamed to broach the subject, Kramer tactlessly suggests a nose job to Audrey, shocking everyone. However, with the idea planted in Audrey's mind, George uses this as cover to encourage Audrey's interest while pretending to be impartial.

Jerry hooks up with a beautiful woman, Isabel, even though she fails to understand his pick-up line. Jerry is intellectually repulsed by Isabel but carnally addicted at the same time, and George warns that his brain cannot prevail over his penis. Unable to throw away Isabel's number, Jerry gives it to Kramer to rip up, but recants and begs for it back. In disgust, Kramer leaves Jerry desperately scrabbling on the floor to reassemble the scraps of paper.

Kramer moves to reclaim the jacket that his mother's ex-boyfriend, Albert, took back before being jailed. Posing as Albert's daughter and her fiancé, Elaine and Kramer bluff past Albert's landlord and retrieve the jacket, but the landlord recalls deeply unflattering memories of Kramer's mother with Albert. Kramer assaults the landlord, but still makes away with the jacket.

As Jerry halfheartedly rehearses with Isabel for her aspiring acting career, he imagines his personified brain and penis both vying for dominance by playing chess. "Brain" Jerry protests Isabel's hackneyed acting, but "Penis" Jerry's endurance gives out first despite his confidence. "Brain" Jerry wins, empowering Jerry to break up with Isabel.

When the much-anticipated surgery collapses Audrey's nose, George faints at the sight and Kramer attends to the distraught Audrey. Having no faith in a second operation to rebuild her nose, George refuses to look at Audrey or travel with her, and she breaks up with him. After Kramer's doctor repairs her nose, Audrey dazzles everyone with her normally-proportioned visage as she starts dating Kramer.
