= The Alternate Side =

- Seinfeld episode
- Episode no.: Season 3 Episode 11
- Directed by: Tom Cherones
- Written by: Larry David and Bill Masters
- Production code: 310
- Original air date: December 4, 1991

Guest appearances
- Jay Brooks as Sid; Janet Zarish as Rental Car Agent; Edward Penn as Owen; Jeff Barton as Paramedic

Episode chronology
| ← Previous "The Stranded" | Next → "The Red Dot" |
- Seinfeld season 3

"The Alternate Side" is the 28th episode of the sitcom Seinfeld. The episode was the 11th episode of the show's third season, and aired on NBC on December 4, 1991.

The episode was written by Larry David and Bill Masters, and was directed by Tom Cherones. The idea for the Woody Allen story came from David's experiences working with Allen; he briefly appeared in Radio Days (1987) and New York Stories (1989). He would later have a lead role in Whatever Works (2009). The episode repeatedly uses the line "these pretzels are making me thirsty," one of the first popular lines to emerge from the show, which inspired fans to throw pretzels during Jerry Seinfeld's stand-up comedy performances during the few months following its premiere.

In 2012, Jerry Seinfeld identified this as his least-favorite episode of the series, saying the stroke patient storyline made him feel uncomfortable.

== Plot ==
After Jerry's car is stolen, he calls the thief over his own car phone. The thief (voiced by Larry David) refuses to return the car, but agrees to mail back some gloves Kramer left inside. Jerry learns that his car was stolen because Sid, the neighborhood man paid to re-park cars on their alternate side parking street, left the keys inside after being distracted by Woody Allen filming a movie. George takes over for Sid while he is away, believing the job will be easy money.

Kramer lucks into an extra role in the movie, then amuses Allen with a pratfall and receives a speaking line: "These pretzels are making me thirsty." The group workshops the line, with George turning it into a lament for his unemployed, single life as he struggles to corral cars.

Elaine decides to break up with Owen, a 66-year-old writer, but he falls unconscious before she can. She brings him to Jerry's apartment and they call an ambulance while trying to incorrectly treat Owen for hypoglycemia. George's triple-parking creates gridlock that holds up both the ambulance and the movie shoot. Distracted by the infuriated Woody Allen, George hits the ambulance in Jerry's rental car.

Sid's business is scuttled by George having mishandled many cars. The ensuing fiasco makes the newspaper, which reports that Owen's stroke was exacerbated by the delayed paramedics, and that Allen is renouncing filming in New York City. Jerry, having failed to read his rental agreement, is liable for thousands in damage because his insurance does not cover other drivers.

Despite fearing that she will be accused of abandoning the paralyzed Owen, Elaine breaks up with him anyway, offering rationalizations while he is unable to reply. Jerry and Elaine both invoke Kramer's line to lament their predicaments.

Later, Owen recovers and confesses that he was using Elaine for sex. Kramer finally films his line, slamming down a beer glass and cutting Allen with flying glass. He is fired, but gets his gloves back from the car thief.

== Critical reception ==
The New York Post listed the "pretzels" line as one of "Seinfeld's 25 greatest contributions to the English language". An article about Elaine's boyfriends, meanwhile, suggests that in the context of Woody Allen films, "perhaps Elaine's strange relationship with Owen, a senior citizen at 66, can be explained as some kind of Manhattan reference".
