= Chunky (candy bar) =

Chocolate square made by Ferrara Candy Company

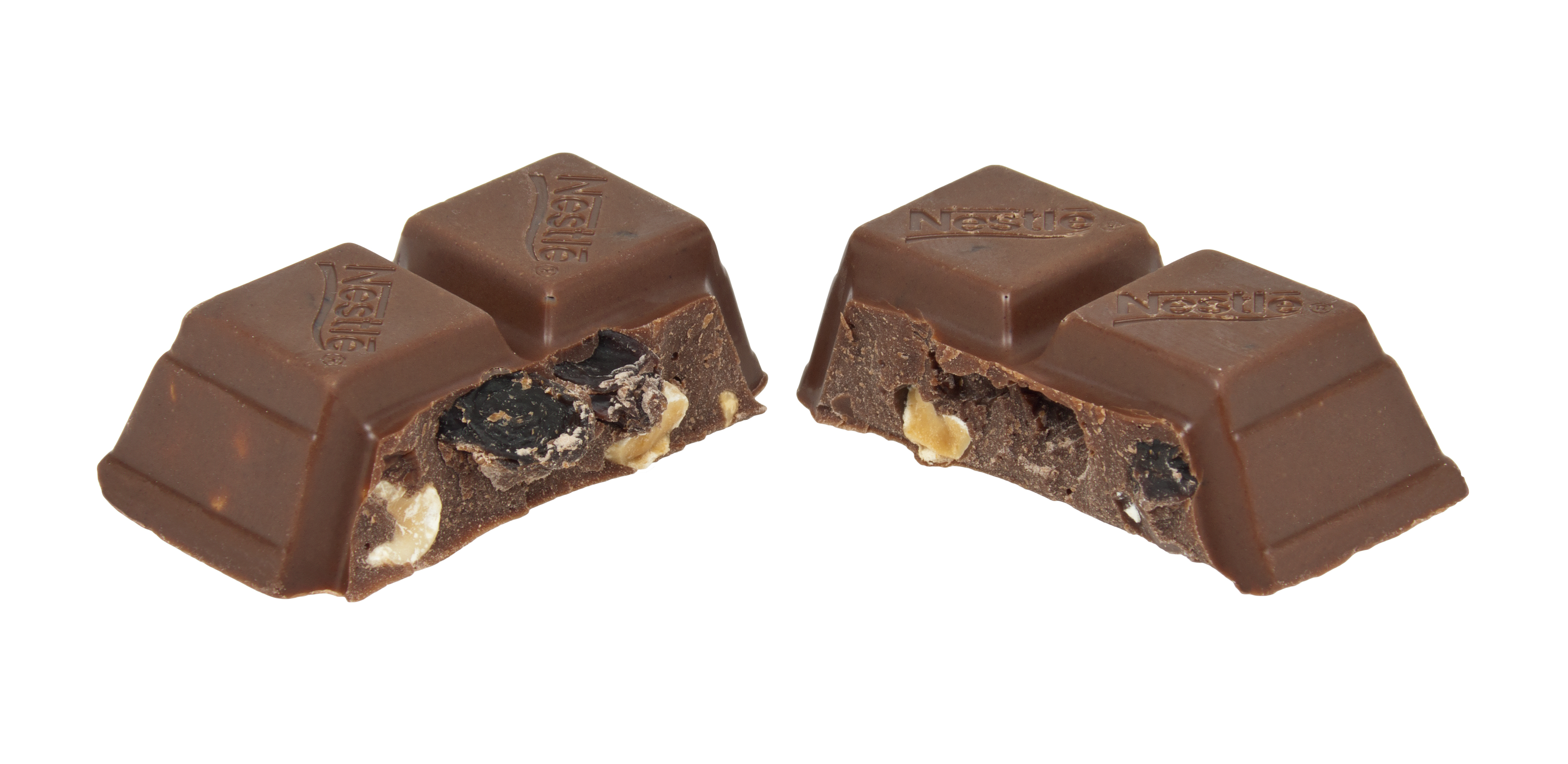
A Chunky broken in half

Chunky is a chocolate bar made with milk chocolate, raisins, and roasted peanuts in the shape of a truncated pyramid scored into quarters. Chunky is produced by Ferrara Candy Company, a division of Ferrero SpA.

== History ==
The Chunky candy bar was introduced in the late 1930s by New York City candy maker Philip Silvershein, at the time made with milk chocolate, raisins, cashews and Brazil nuts. Silvershein, a friend of William Wrigley Jr., distributed the bar via the Wrigley Gum Company. When Nestlé assumed rights to the brand in 1984, it changed the ingredients to milk chocolate, raisins and peanuts. In 2018, Ferrero SpA purchased Nestlé's U.S. candy line, which included Chunky.

== Advertising ==
"Chunky Square", a pavilion at the 1964 New York World's Fair, featured a glass-walled automated factory, where visitors could watch the manufacturing of Chunky candy bars.

An early 1970s TV commercial for Chunky showed a young boy watching TV with his father. The boy amused viewers by claiming that Chunky was "THICKER-ER". The candy bar used the "Thicker-er" campaign into the 1980s.

Other Chunky advertising slogans included "Chunky, What a Chunk o' Chocolate", intoned by the nasal voice of Arnold Stang, and "Open Wide for Chunky".

== Varieties ==
- Original – milk chocolate, peanuts and raisins – silver wrapper
- Pecan Chunky (discontinued) – milk chocolate, pecans only – gold wrapper
- Dark Chunky (discontinued) – dark chocolate, peanuts and raisins – gold wrapper
- Deluxe Nut (discontinued) – milk chocolate, peanuts, almonds, cashews, and hazelnuts – gold wrapper
- Solid Milk Chocolate (discontinued) – milk chocolate only – brown wrapper
- Miniatures ("Cuties") (discontinued) – same as originals but 1"x 1"x 3/4" thick (individually wrapped), in a poly-bag
