= Alternate-side parking =

Concept in traffic law

Alternate-side parking is a traffic law that dictates on which side of a street cars can be parked on a given day. The law is intended to promote efficient flow of traffic, as well as to allow street sweepers and snowplows to reach the curb without parked cars impeding their progress. Some proponents also regard the law, which can be quite inconvenient for drivers, as a way to encourage the use of public transportation.

In many towns and cities, alternate-side parking is reserved for certain times of year, or only used during a snow emergency.

== Around the world ==
=== New York City ===
From the beginning, the New York City alternate-side parking law was "assailed" by opponents as actually impeding the efficient flow of traffic. The system was created by either Paul Rogers Screvane, while a sanitation commissioner in Queens, New York, or Isidore Cohen, a Sanitation Department employee who later rose to Manhattan borough superintendent.

The law is a year-round rule, suspended only for holidays and certain events. Signs are posted with the scheduled street sweeping times, and drivers must make sure their vehicles are on the correct side of the street or risk being ticketed or towed. The law can be confusing to visitors, who often choose to park in high-priced parking garages or use valet parking rather than risking fines. Even for locals, parking tickets are common; working late or oversleeping may cause a car to be left for too long on the wrong side of the street. Avoiding a ticket can consume a great deal of time, as drivers must search for other available spaces or sit double parked until the designated time, regardless of when street sweepers actually pass.

==== Example ====
On a street running east to west, cars must be moved from the south side of the street for a few hours a day every Monday, Wednesday and Friday. On Tuesday, Thursday, and Saturday they must be moved from the north side. On Sunday and certain holidays, they can be left where they are. The specific times will vary from street to street. The days on which the rules are suspended may also vary from city to city and even from neighbourhood to neighbourhood. Apps and services like SpotAngels offer crowdsourced maps of NYC alternate side parking rules.

=== Sweden ===
Parking prohibited signs in Sweden:
| On this street. | On Wednesdays. | Entering zone. | Leaving zone. | Alternate-side parking zone begins. |
| | Onsd 09–15; 1 dec – 15 maj |

In Sweden, alternate-side parking (datumparkering) is applied in zones covering an entire city, with signs indicating this at the city perimeter. Inside such date zones (datumzon), parking is prohibited on the morning of odd dates on the side of the street where houses have odd numbers. The drivers must think of what date it is the next morning if they leave the car in the evening. Inspired by Stockholm, more and more Swedish cities are abandoning such confusing zones and instead provide permanent parking on one or both sides of the street, with the exception for one day per week from December to May, when snow ploughing and sweeping of sand can be required. The day when parking is prohibited is posted on a sign for each street.

=== Denmark ===
In Denmark (datoparkering), the rules are exactly the opposite of those in Sweden, with parking prohibited on the morning of odd dates on the side of the street where houses have even numbers.

=== Belgium ===
Belgian road sign E11

Belgium allows a half-monthly parking rule (Dutch: Halfmaandelijks beurtelings parkeren, French: Stationnement alterné semi-mensuel). When the entrance of the town is marked by road sign E11, alternate-side parking applies to the whole town agglomeration. Parking on the road from the 1st till the 15th of each month is only allowed on the side of the road with odd house numbers; from the 16th till the end of the month, parking on the road is only allowed on the side of the road with even house numbers. At the end of each period, cars should change sides between 19.30 and 20.00. The rule doesn't apply on parking spots outside the roadway or on dedicated spots marked by other parking rules.

=== France ===
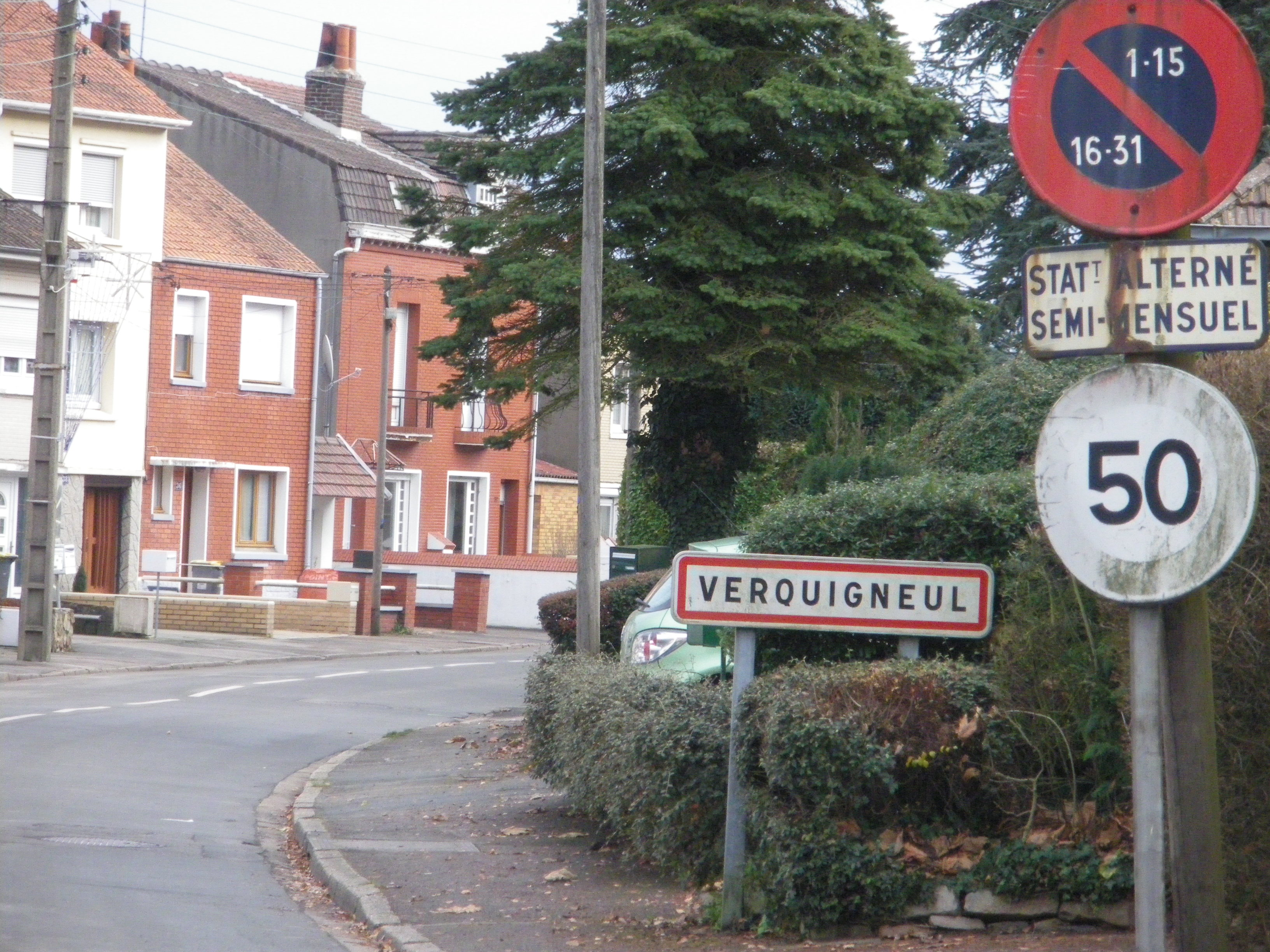
Old half-monthly alternate-side parking sign at the town entrance of Verquigneul, France

Similar parking regulations exist in France.

=== Spain ===
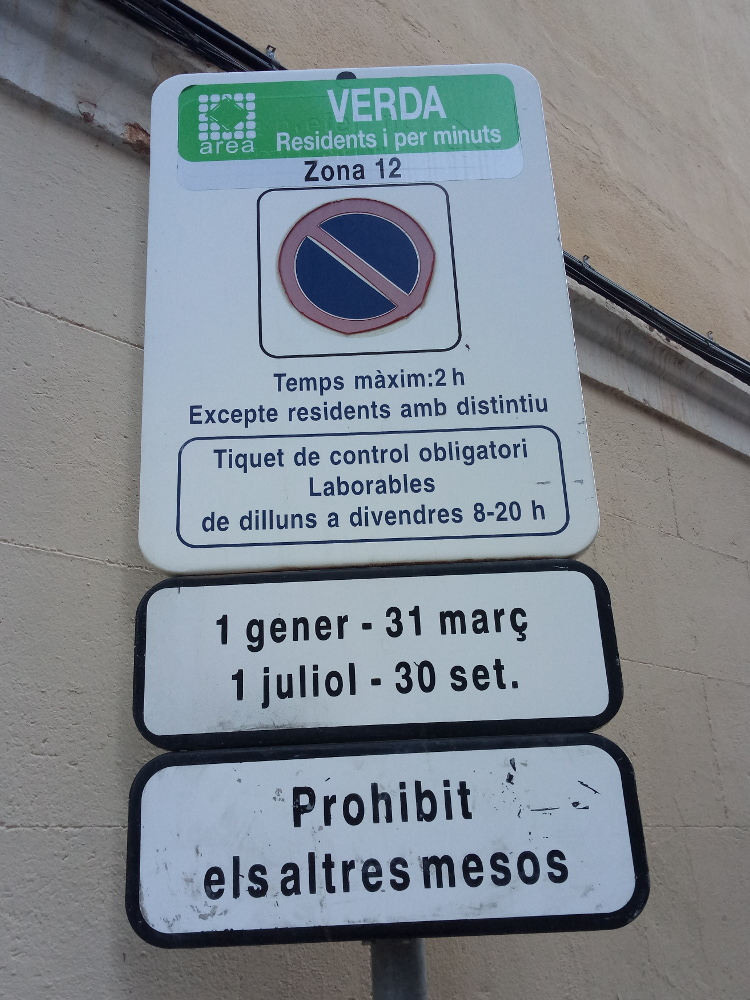
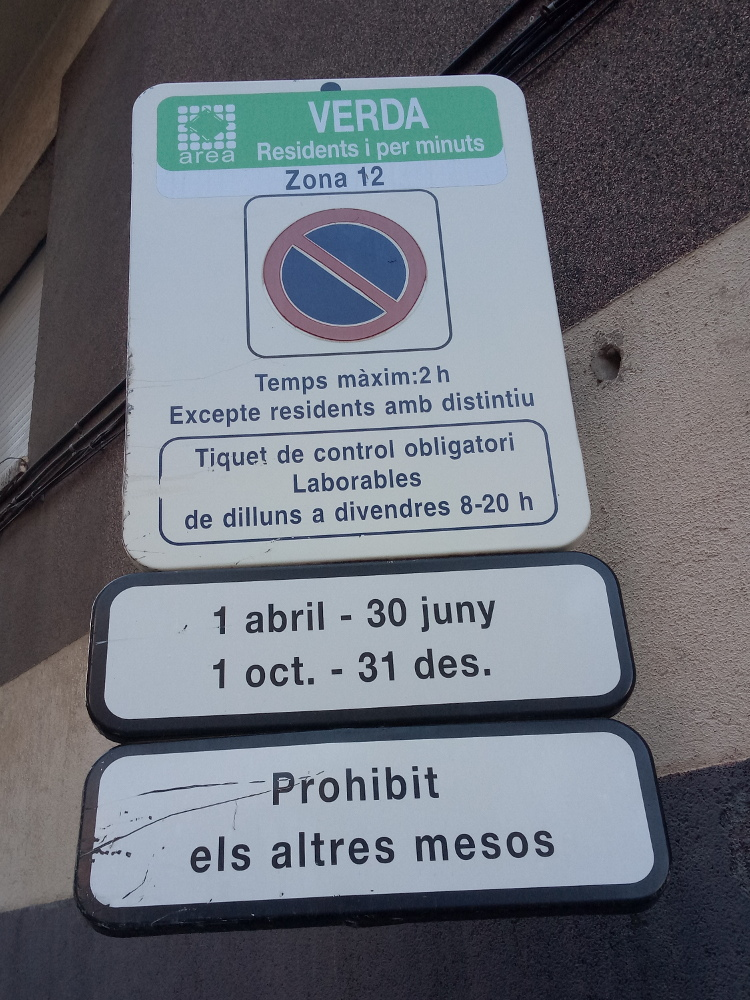
Alternate-parking signs in Barcelona from each side of street

In Spain some cities have similar parking regulations. In Barcelona, for example, the parking side in small streets changes every three months. In these streets, every street side has a sign showing the regular parking conditions, an additional sign below shows the dates when parking on this side of the street is allowed and prohibited.

=== Other countries ===
In most other countries, like in the Netherlands, the street sweep vehicle is usually accompanied by a few street sweeping persons, who go around the parked cars with brooms. They bring the garbage from around the parked cars to the road, from where the sweep vehicle takes it over. This way, citizens do not have to move their parked cars.
