= Seinfeld =

American television sitcom (1989–1998)

- Genre: Sitcom
- Created by: Larry David; Jerry Seinfeld
- Showrunners: Larry David (seasons 1–7); Jerry Seinfeld (season 8–9)
- Directed by: Tom Cherones (seasons 1–5); Andy Ackerman (seasons 6–9); Various (seasons 1, 3, 6 & 8)
- Starring: Jerry Seinfeld; Julia Louis-Dreyfus; Michael Richards; Jason Alexander
- Theme music composer: Jonathan Wolff
- Composer: Jonathan Wolff
- Country of origin: United States
- Original language: English
- No. of seasons: 9
- No. of episodes: 180 (list of episodes)

Production
- Executive producers: Larry David (1990–1996); George Shapiro; Howard West; Andrew Scheinman; (1991–1993); Jerry Seinfeld (1996–1998); Alec Berg (1997–1998); Jeff Schaffer (1997–1998)
- Camera setup: Multi-camera
- Running time: 22–24 minutes
- Production companies: Giggling Goose Productions (1989, pilot); Fred Barron Productions (1990, season 1); West/Shapiro Productions; Castle Rock Entertainment

Original release
- Network: NBC
- Release: July 5, 1989 – May 14, 1998

Related
- Curb Your Enthusiasm

Seinfeld (/ˈsaɪnfɛld/ SYNE-feld) is an American television sitcom created by Larry David and Jerry Seinfeld. It originally aired on NBC from July 5, 1989, to May 14, 1998, with a total of nine seasons consisting of 180 episodes. Its ensemble cast stars Seinfeld as a fictionalized version of himself and focuses on his personal life with his three friends: best friend George Costanza (Jason Alexander), ex-girlfriend Elaine Benes (Julia Louis-Dreyfus), and eccentric apartment neighbor Cosmo Kramer (Michael Richards).

Seinfeld is set mostly in and around the titular character's apartment in Manhattan's Upper West Side in New York City. It has been described as "a show about nothing", often focusing on the minutiae of daily life. Interspersed in all episodes of the first seven seasons are moments of stand-up comedy from the fictional Jerry Seinfeld, frequently related to the episode's events.

As a rising comedian in the late 1980s, Jerry Seinfeld was presented with an opportunity to create a show with NBC. He asked Larry David, a fellow comedian and friend, to help create a premise for a sitcom. The series was produced by West/Shapiro Productions and Castle Rock Entertainment and is distributed in syndication by Sony Pictures Television Studios. (Note: formerly known as Columbia TriStar Television Distribution from 1995 to 2002 and Sony Pictures Television from 2002 to 2021.) It was largely written by David and Seinfeld along with scriptwriters. A favorite among critics, the series led the Nielsen ratings in Seasons 6 and 9 and finished among the top two (along with ER of the same network) every year from 1994 to 1998. Only two other shows—I Love Lucy and The Andy Griffith Show—finished their runs at the top of the ratings.

Seinfeld is universally regarded as one of the greatest and most influential American shows of all time. Its most renowned episodes include "The Chinese Restaurant", "The Soup Nazi", "The Parking Garage", "The Marine Biologist", "The Contest", and "The Strike", which introduced the December 23rd holiday of Festivus. E! named the series the "Number 1 reason [why] the '90s ruled". Quotes from numerous episodes have become catchphrases in popular culture.

== Production ==
=== Conception ===
Seinfeld began as a 23-minute pilot titled "The Seinfeld Chronicles". Created by Jerry Seinfeld and Larry David, developed by NBC executive Rick Ludwin, and produced by Castle Rock Entertainment, it was a mix of Seinfeld's stand-up comedy routines and idiosyncratic, conversational scenes focusing on mundane aspects of everyday life like laundry, the buttoning of the top button on one's shirt, and the effort by men to interpret the intent of women spending the night in Seinfeld's apartment.

The pilot was filmed at Stage 8 of Desilu Cahuenga studios, the same studio where The Dick Van Dyke Show was filmed (seen by the crew as a good omen), and was recorded at Ren-Mar Studios in Hollywood. The pilot was first screened to a group of two dozen NBC executives in Burbank, California, in early 1989. This one, however, did not yield the explosion of laughter garnered by the pilots for the decade's previous NBC successes like The Cosby Show and The Golden Girls. Brandon Tartikoff was not convinced the show would work. A Jewish man from New York himself, Tartikoff characterized it as "Too New York, too Jewish". Test audiences were even harsher. NBC's practice at the time was to recruit 400 households by phone to ask them to evaluate pilots it aired on an unused channel on its cable system. An NBC research department memo summarized the pilot's performance among the respondents as "weak", which Warren Littlefield, then second-in-command in NBC's entertainment division, called "a dagger to the heart". Comments included, "You can't get too excited about two guys going to the laundromat", "Jerry's loser friend George isn't a forceful character", "Jerry needs a stronger supporting cast", and "Why are they interrupting the stand-up for these stupid stories?" Seinfeld and David did not see the memo for several years, but after they became aware of it, they hung it in a bathroom on the set. Seinfeld comments, "We thought, if someone goes in to use this bathroom, this is something they should see. It fits that moment."

Around the time the show's pilot was filmed, Castle Rock Entertainment had also produced another pilot for NBC that featured Ann Jillian in her almost-similarly eponymous TV series. When The Seinfeld Chronicles tested poorly with audiences, Castle Rock focused on Jillian's series, which tested better with audiences and received a full-season order. Ann Jillian lasted only a single season of 13 episodes and was off the air by the end of 1990.

=== First seasons ===
When NBC announced its 1989–90 (primetime) schedule in May 1989, The Seinfeld Chronicles was not included, but the show's supporters did not give up. The pilot first aired on July 5, 1989, and finished second in its time slot against the CBS police drama Jake and the Fatman, receiving a Nielsen rating of 10.9/19. The ratings did not exhibit the regional skew Tartikoff predicted, much to the encouragement of the show's supporters. Ludwin canceled one of the Bob Hope specials budgeted for that season so the entertainment division had the money to order four more episodes of The Seinfeld Chronicles, which formed the rest of the show's first season (the series was by then retitled to Seinfeld)—a move without which Chicago Tribune columnist Phil Rosenthal later said there "would be no Seinfeld". Although this was a very low order number for a new series—and the smallest sitcom order in TV history—Castle Rock failed to find any other buyers when it shopped the show to other networks, and accepted the order. Seinfeld did not return to the airwaves until May 30, 1990, and it was another three years before it became a Top 5-rated show. Preston Beckman, in charge of NBC's research department at the time, reminisced, "The show was different. Nobody had seen anything like it. It wasn't unusual for poor-testing shows to get on the air, but it was very rare that they became hits."

When the program was first repeated on July 5, 1990, it received a rating of 13.9/26. These ratings were high enough to secure a second season. NBC research showed that the show was popular with young male adults, a demographic sought after by advertisers. This gave NBC an incentive to keep broadcasting the show. One DVD reviewer, Britt Gillette, wrote that "this initial episode exhibits the flashes of brilliance that made Seinfeld a cultural phenomenon."

=== Filming ===
The show was written by David and Seinfeld, along with writers who included Larry Charles, Peter Mehlman, Gregg Kavet, Carol Leifer, David Mandel, Jeff Schaffer, Steve Koren, Jennifer Crittenden, Tom Gammill, Max Pross, Dan O'Keefe, Charlie Rubin, Marjorie Gross, Alec Berg, Elaine Pope, and Spike Feresten.

Other than the pilot, the series was filmed at CBS Studio Center in Studio City, Los Angeles. The first three seasons were filmed on Soundstage 19; it then moved to the larger Stage 9 for the remainder of its production. Despite numerous establishing shots taken in New York City, all scenes of the actors walking in New York were also filmed at CBS Studio Center, on their New York Street backlot. Street scenes and park scenes were filmed in the CBS Studio Centre's New York Street and Central Park backlots, respectively.

A source of problems for the cast was the small sets, especially that of Jerry's apartment; Alexander noted, "If you knew you were doing a series for nine years, you would never build that set." Adding to the problem was that the scripts contained only minimal physical direction, leaving the actors needing help to come up with actions to perform while speaking. Eventually, they got into a routine of directing each other on how to make their movements look natural. Alexander said this helped them build chemistry with each other.

Filming usually went long, as the cast and Larry David were perfectionists. If a joke did not elicit the desired reaction, they rewrote it and performed it again. In at least one case, "The Marine Biologist", this led to David writing an entirely new scene requiring Alexander to memorize a monologue in only a matter of minutes. Laugh tracks were used only for matching shots, not for artificially adding laughter.

Various locations used for establishing shots included Tom's Restaurant at 112th Street and Broadway (Monk's Cafe), Midtown West's Roosevelt Hospital (recurring exterior emergency room scene and indoor scenes in 'The Junior Mint' and 'The Bris'), Cornell Medical Centre at 525 East 68th Street, 22-39 37th Street, Queens (The Costanzas' house), the Taconic State Parkway exit to the Hopewell Junction, Dutchess County, New York (driving scene in 'The Bubble Boy'), and the Amagansett farmers market, Long Island ('The Hamptons'). The exterior shot used for Jerry's New York apartment building was actually located at 757 S New Hampshire Avenue, Los Angeles. The real-life exterior of Pendant Publishing, Elaine's workplace, is located at 1325 Ave of the Americas, New York. The live stand-up comedy performed by Seinfeld at the beginning of most episodes was truly filmed at The Improv, a comedy club at 358 West 44th Street, Manhattan; though it closed in 1993, another comedy club operates at the site today. The Yankee Stadium exterior seen in the show has now been demolished. Most office building establishing shots are real businesses and locations. Various real street locations can be gleaned from the car windows during driving scenes. By the final season, each episode of the series cost $3 million to $3.5 million.

More than 120 episodes make reference to the Superman franchise. Teri Hatcher, who played Lois Lane on Lois & Clark: The New Adventures of Superman, plays Jerry's girlfriend Sidra. Paula Marshall, who played Christina Riley on the Superboy TV series, portrays the journalist Sharon, who Jerry says reminds him of Lois Lane. Sherman Howard, who played Lex Luthor on Superboy, portrays Roy. Superman logos and figurines frequently appear in Jerry's apartment. Seinfeld and Superman later appeared in an American Express commercial.

== Series overview ==
=== Plotlines ===
Many Seinfeld episodes are based on the writers' real-life experiences, with the experiences reinterpreted for the characters' storylines. For example, George's storyline in "The Revenge" is based on Larry David's experience at Saturday Night Live. "The Contest" is also based on David's experiences. "The Smelly Car" storyline is based on Peter Mehlman's lawyer friend, who could not get a bad smell out of his car. "The Strike" is based on Dan O'Keefe's dad, who made up his own holiday: Festivus. Other stories take a variety of turns. "The Chinese Restaurant" consists of George, Jerry, and Elaine waiting for a table throughout the entire episode. "The Boyfriend", revolving around Keith Hernandez, extends through two episodes. "The Betrayal" is famous for using reverse chronology and was inspired by a similar plot device in a Harold Pinter play, Betrayal. Some stories were inspired by headlines and rumors, as explained in the DVD features "Notes About Nothing", "Inside Look" and "Audio Commentary". In "The Maestro", Kramer's lawsuit is roughly similar to the McDonald's coffee case. "The Outing" is based primarily on rumors that Larry Charles heard about Jerry Seinfeld's sexuality.

=== Themes ===
The series was often described as "a show about nothing". However, in 2014, Seinfeld stated: "The pitch for the show, the real pitch, when Larry and I went to NBC in 1988, was [that] we want to show how a comedian gets his material. The show "about nothing" was just a joke in an episode many years later, and Larry and I to this day are surprised that it caught on as a way that people describe the show because, to us, it's the opposite of that." David similarly commented: "I like taking the worst qualities that a person has and trying to make something funny out of it. Doesn't everybody do terrible things and have terrible thoughts? Just by trying to be as funny, you're going to deal with a lot of things that are real, so the show's really about something. The whole thing about the show being about nothing is ridiculous."

Much of the show's humor is based upon repeated use of irony, incongruity, and (oftentimes unfortunate) coincidences. Additionally, guest characters are frequently introduced with little to no context, with a humorous focus on the atypical names of these characters, which often contain alliteration. In keeping with Seinfeld's reputation as a clean comedian, though the show frequently contains dialogue around sexual themes, the show notably avoids using almost all explicit sexual terminology. Notably, in the popular episode "The Contest", whose plot line concerns a contest amongst the main characters to see which one can go the longest without masturbating, the word 'masturbation' is never mentioned. Seinfeld broke several conventions of mainstream television. David is credited with refusing to follow a predictable sitcom formula that would have a romantic relationship develop between Jerry and Elaine.

The show offers no growth or reconciliation to its characters and eschews sentimentality. An episode is typically driven by humor interspersed with the superficial conflicts of characters with peculiar dispositions. Many episodes revolve around the characters' involvement in the lives of others, with typically disastrous results. On the set, the notion that the characters should not develop or improve throughout the series was expressed as the "no hugging, no learning" rule. Larry David was adamant from the beginning that he did not want the characters to mature, grow or learn from their past mistakes. The characters are "thirty-something singles with vague identities, no roots, and conscious indifference to morals." Also unlike most sitcoms, there are no moments of pathos; the audience is never made to feel sorry for any of the characters. Even Susan's death in "The Invitations" elicits no genuine emotions from anybody in the show. Seinfeld does not shy away from making light of tough topics, from death to illness to disability.

The show frequently engages in fourth-wall-breaking humor and self-satire. One such example is the story arc where the characters pitch a TV sitcom series named Jerry. The show within a show Jerry echoes many characteristics of Seinfeld: among others, it is described as being "about nothing", and Seinfeld plays himself. The fictional Jerry was launched in the Season 4 finale, but unlike Seinfeld, it was not picked up as a series. Jerry is one of many examples of metafiction in the show. There are no fewer than 22 fictional movies featured, including Rochelle, Rochelle. Because of these several elements, Seinfeld became the first TV series since Monty Python's Flying Circus to be widely described as postmodern.

Seinfeld is an avid Abbott and Costello fan and has cited The Abbott and Costello Show as an influence on Seinfeld: "Everybody on the show knows I'm a fan. We're always joking about how we do stuff from their show. George and I will often get into a riff that has the rhythm from the old Abbott and Costello shows. And sometimes, I'll hit George in the chest the way Abbott would hit Costello". The series includes numerous references to the team. George Costanza's middle name is "Louis", after Costello. "The Old Man" episode features a cantankerous character named "Sid Fields" as a tribute to the landlord on the team's TV show. Kramer's friend is named Mickey Abbott. A copywriter for the J. Peterman catalog is named Eddie Sherman, after the team's longtime agent. In Episode 30, Kramer hears the famous Abbott and Costello line, "His father was a mudder. His mother was a mudder."

=== Catchphrases ===
Many terms were coined, popularized, or re-popularized in the series' run and have become part of popular culture, including "Yada, yada, yada", "No soup for you!", "Master of my domain", "That's a shame", and "Not that there's anything wrong with that." The lexicon of Seinfeldian code words and recurring phrases that evolved around particular episodes is referred to as Seinlanguage, which is also the title of Jerry Seinfeld's best-selling book on humor. These terms include "man hands", "shrinkage", "regift", and "double dip".

=== Consumer products ===
A recurring feature of Seinfeld was its inclusion of specific products, especially candy, as plot points. These might be a central feature of a plot (e.g., Junior Mints, Twix, Chuckles, Jujyfruits, bite-size Three Musketeers, Snickers, Chunky, Oh Henry!, Drake's Coffee Cake and PEZ), or an association of candy with a guest character (e.g. Oh Henry! bars) or simply a conversational aside (e.g., Chuckles, Clark Bar, Twinkies). A large number of non-candy products were also featured throughout the series.

The show's creators claim that they weren't engaging in a product placement strategy for commercial gain. One motivation for the use of real-world products, entirely unrelated to commercial considerations, is the comedy value of funny-sounding phrases and words. "I knew I wanted Kramer to think of watching the operation like going to see a movie," explained Seinfeld writer/producer Andy Robin in an interview published in The Hollywood Reporter. "At first, I thought maybe a piece of popcorn falls into the patient. I ran that by my brother, and he said, 'No, Junior Mints are just funnier.'"

Many advertisers capitalized on the popularity of Seinfeld. American Express created a webisode where Jerry Seinfeld and an animated Superman (voiced by Patrick Warburton, who played the role of Puddy) starred in its commercial. The makers of the Today Sponge created the "Spongeworthy" game on their website, inspired by "The Sponge". An advertisement featured Jason Alexander in a Chrysler commercial. In this, Alexander acts much like his character George, and his relationship with Lee Iacocca plays on George's relationship with Steinbrenner. Similarly, Michael Richards was the focus of a series of advertisements for Vodafone, which ran in Australia, where he dressed and acted precisely like Kramer, including the trademark bumbling pratfalls. In addition, the show occasionally incorporated fictional products like a Scotch brand called "Hennigan's" (a blend of "Hennessy" and "Brannigans") and a canned meat product called "Beef-a-reeno" (a parody of "Beef-a-roni").

=== Music ===
The Seinfeld music was composed by Jonathan Wolff, who had previously composed for sitcoms including Who's the Boss? and Married with Children. The pilot episode had a theme composed by a different composer, but Seinfeld felt it interfered with his standup sequences. Whereas previous sitcoms had been melodic and lyrical, Wolff did not want to create a typical theme and instead wanted to create an instantly recognizable "audio signature". He composed a theme comprising samples of slap bass taken from multiple sources, edited and processed with compression, equalized and other effects. He added percussion with finger snaps and mouth noises to create an organic "percolating energy" and blend with the "quirky" patterns of Seinfeld's speech. When the network asked for a more conventional theme for the second season, David refused. Wolff composed variations on the theme to match the rhythms and dialogue of each episode.

In "The Note", the first episode of Season 3, the bumper music featured scatting female backup singers who sang a phrase that sounded like the tune "Easy to Beat". Jerry Seinfeld and executive producer Larry David both liked Wolff's additions, and three episodes were produced with this new style of music. However, they had neglected to inform NBC and Castle Rock executives of the change, and when the season premiere aired, the executives were surprised and unimpressed and requested that they return to the original style. The subsequent two episodes were redone, leaving this episode as the only one with additional music elements. In the commentary of "The Note", Louis-Dreyfus facetiously suggests it was removed because the perceived lyric related closely to the low ratings at the time. The soundtrack was given a digital release on July 2, 2021.

== Cast and characters ==
=== Main characters ===
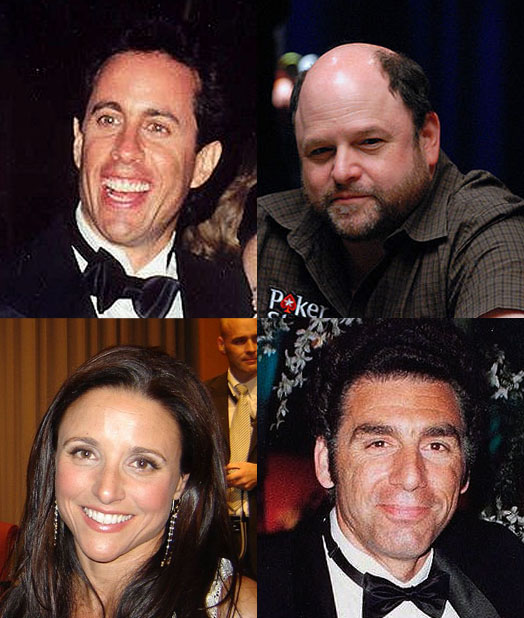
Main cast: Seinfeld (upper left); Alexander (upper right); Richards (lower right); Louis-Dreyfus (lower left).

- Jerry Seinfeld (himself) – Jerry is a "minor celebrity" stand-up comedian who is often depicted as "the voice of common sense and reason" amid the general insanity generated by the people in his world. However, the in-show character is also overly fixated on minor imperfections, often ending romantic relationships for the tiniest of perceived flaws in a dating partner. He is a mild germophobe and neat freak, as well as a fan of Superman, New York Mets, and breakfast cereal. Jerry's apartment is the center of a world visited by his eccentric friends and a focus of the show.
- George Costanza (Jason Alexander) – George has been Jerry's best friend since high school. He is stingy, conniving, pedantic, and envious of others' achievements. He is depicted as a loser who is perpetually lacking confidence about his capabilities. He rants and lies easily about his profession, relationships, and almost everything else, which usually creates trouble for him later. He often uses the alias Art Vandelay when lying or concocting a cover story. Despite these shortcomings, George is usually very reliable to his friends and frequently has success in dating women. After a series of disastrous jobs (the disasters often being of his own making), George eventually secures a steady career as an assistant to the traveling secretary for the New York Yankees. The character of George was based on Larry David himself.
- Elaine Benes (Julia Louis-Dreyfus) – Elaine is Jerry's ex-girlfriend and later friend. Generally depicted as smarter than her friends, she is friendly while also being sarcastic, somewhat elitist, and hot-tempered. She is occasionally depicted as vegetarian or pescatarian, without the strength of conviction to keep this up regularly. She sometimes tends to be too honest with people (usually by losing her temper), which often gets her into trouble. She usually gets caught up in her boyfriends' quirks, eccentric employers' unusual behaviors and idiosyncrasies, and the maladjustment of total strangers. She tends to make poor choices in men she dates and is often overly reactive. She works for a time at Pendant Publishing with Mr. Lippman. Later she is hired as a personal assistant for Mr. Pitt. She eventually worked for the J. Peterman catalog as a writer. Elaine is popularly described as an amalgamation of David's and Seinfeld's girlfriends during their early days in New York as struggling comedians.
- Cosmo Kramer (Michael Richards) – Kramer is Jerry's slacker neighbor. His trademarks include his humorous upright pompadour hairstyle, vintage clothes, and energetic sliding bursts through Jerry's apartment door. Kramer was heavily based on a neighbor of David's during his amateur comedic years in Manhattan. At times, he appears naïve, uneducated, and impulsive, and at other times, quick-witted, helpful, and empathetic; similarly he is exaggeratedly successful, socially, with his charisma and laid-back personality. This is seen in his success with women and employers. He has been described as a "hipster doofus". Although he never holds a steady job, he is rarely short of money and frequently invents wacky schemes that often work at first but eventually fail. Kramer is friends with Newman, and they work well together despite their differences. He often provides slapstick gags.

=== Recurring characters ===
Many characters have made multiple appearances, notably Jerry's parents, Morty and Helen Seinfeld, who reside in Florida; George's parents, the overbearing Frank and Estelle Costanza; George's on-again, off-again fiancée Susan Ross; Jerry's Uncle Leo; Elaine's variety of bosses, Mr. Lippman, Mr. Pitt and J. Peterman; Elaine's on-again, off-again boyfriend David Puddy; and Kramer's friend, Newman, a mail carrier who lives in the same building and is Jerry's nemesis. In addition to recurring characters, Seinfeld features numerous celebrities who appear as themselves or as girlfriends, boyfriends, bosses, and other acquaintances.

Seinfeld's girlfriends

A number of actresses made guest appearances as Seinfeld's love interests in single episodes:

- Isabel (Tawny Kitaen) – "The Nose Job" (season 3, episode 9)
- Nina (Catherine Keener) – "The Letter" (season 3, episode 21)
- Marla (Jane Leeves) – "The Virgin" (season 4, episode 10)
- Sidra (Teri Hatcher) – "The Implant" (season 4, episode 19)
- Amy (Anna Gunn) – "The Glasses" (season 5, episode 3)
- Jody (Jennifer Coolidge) – "The Masseuse" (season 5, episode 9)
- Jane (Jami Gertz) – "The Stall" (season 5, episode 12)
- Meryl (Courteney Cox) – "The Wife" (season 5, episode 17)
- Margaret (Marita Geraghty) - "The Big Salad" (season 6, episode 2)
- Jeannie (Janeane Garofalo) – "The Invitations" (season 7, episode 24)
- Ellen (Christine Taylor) – "The Van Buren Boys" (season 8, episode 14)
- Jenna (Kristin Davis) – "The Pothole" (season 8, episode 16)
- Beth (Debra Messing) – "The Yada Yada" (season 8, episode 19)
- Valerie (Lauren Graham) – "The Millennium" (season 8, episode 20)
- Alex (Melinda Clarke) – "The Muffin Tops" (season 8, episode 21)
- Lanette (Amanda Peet) – "The Summer of George" (season 8, episode 22)
- Patty (Lori Loughlin) – "The Serenity Now" (season 9, episode 3)
- Sara (Marcia Cross) – "The Slicer" (season 9, episode 7)
- Cindy (Angela Featherstone) – "The Maid" (season 9, episode 19)

== Episodes ==
Season	Episodes	Originally released		Rank	Rating	Viewers (millions)
Season	Episodes	First released	Last released	Rank	Rating	Viewers (millions)
1	5	July 5, 1989	June 21, 1990	—N/a	—N/a	19.2
2	12	January 23, 1991	June 26, 1991	46	12.5	18.1
3	23	September 18, 1991	May 6, 1992	43	12.5	17.7
4	24	August 12, 1992	May 20, 1993	25	13.7	20.9
5	22	September 16, 1993	May 19, 1994	3	19.4	29.4
6	24	September 22, 1994	May 18, 1995	1	20.6	31.3
7	24	September 21, 1995	May 16, 1996	2	21.2	33.2
8	22	September 19, 1996	May 15, 1997	2	20.5	32.3
9	24	September 25, 1997	May 14, 1998	1	22.0	35.5

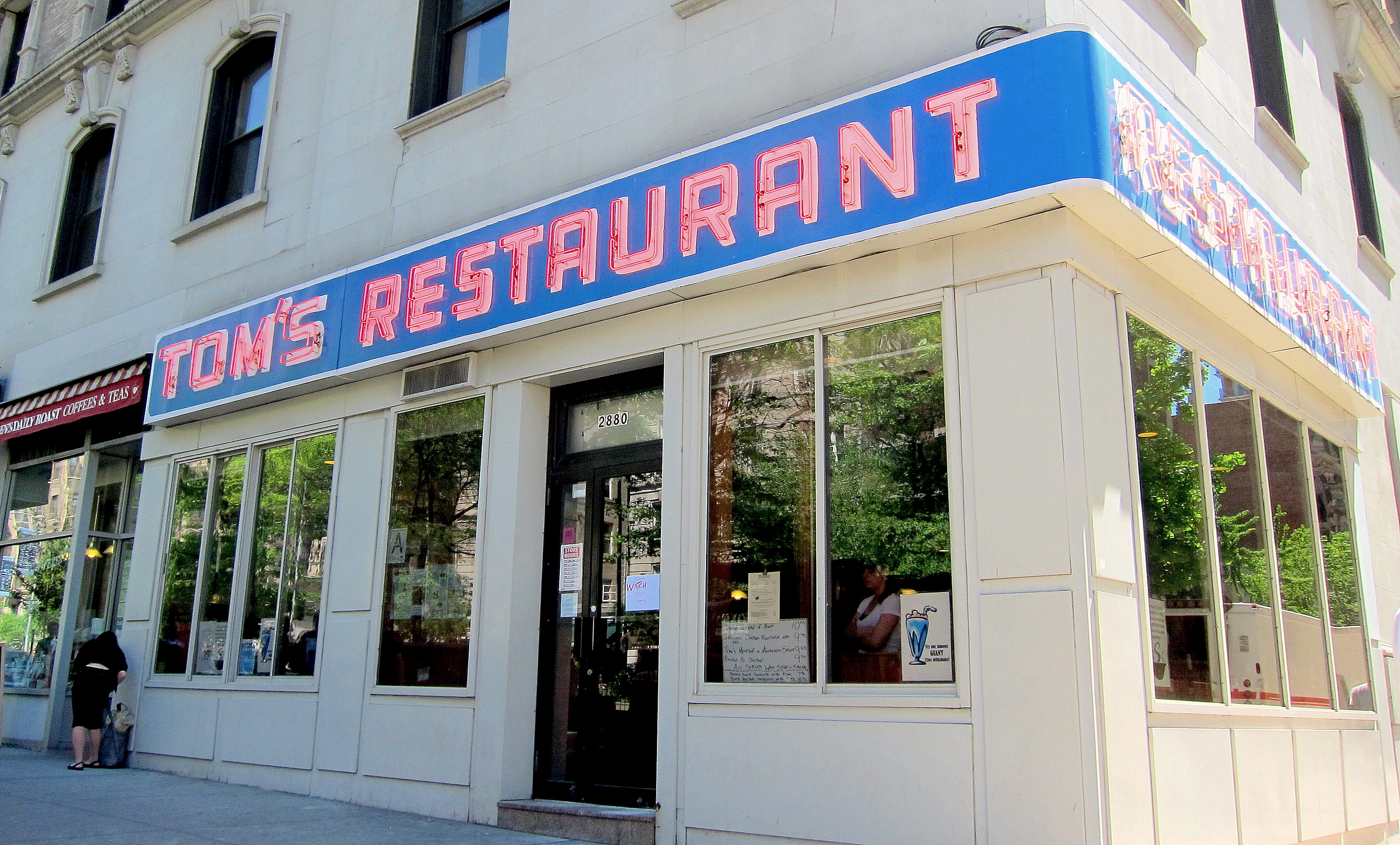
Tom's Restaurant, a diner at 112th St. and Broadway in Manhattan, was used as the exterior image of Monk's Café in the show.

Compared to other family and group sitcoms of the era, Seinfeld stood out. The principal characters are not related by family or work-associated connections but remain distinctly close friends throughout the series. Many characters were based primarily on Seinfeld's and David's real-life acquaintances. Two prominent recurring characters were fictional depictions of actual well-known people: Jacopo Peterman of the J. Peterman catalog (based on John Peterman) and George Steinbrenner, owner of the New York Yankees. Many characters were introduced as new writers got involved with Seinfeld. Other characters based on real people include the Soup Nazi and Jackie Chiles, who was based on Johnnie Cochran.

Episodes have separate plot strands, but the characters' stories often intertwine at the end. The narratives reveal the creators' "consistent efforts to maintain the intimacy" among the small cast of characters.

The show maintains a strong sense of continuity, as characters and plots from past episodes are often referenced or expanded on. Occasionally, story arcs span multiple episodes or entire seasons, such as Season 4, which revolves around the pilot pitch to NBC by Jerry and George. Another example is Jerry's girlfriend Vanessa, who appears in "The Stake Out" and with whom he ends the relationship when things do not work out in "The Stock Tip". Larry David, the head writer and executive producer for the first seven seasons, was praised for keeping a close eye on minor details and ensuring the main characters' lives remained consistent and believable. Curb Your Enthusiasm, David's later comedy series, also had an overarching plot for all but the first season.

A major difference between Seinfeld and the sitcoms that preceded it is that the principal characters never learn from their mistakes. In effect, they are indifferent and even callous toward the outside world and sometimes one another. A mantra of the show's producers was "No hugging, no learning." Entertainment Weekly's TV critic Ken Tucker has described them as "a group dynamic rooted in jealousy, rage, insecurity, despair, hopelessness, and a touching lack of faith in one's fellow human beings." This leads to very few happy endings, except at somebody else's expense. More often in every episode, situations resolve with characters getting a justly deserved comeuppance.

=== Seasons 1–3 ===
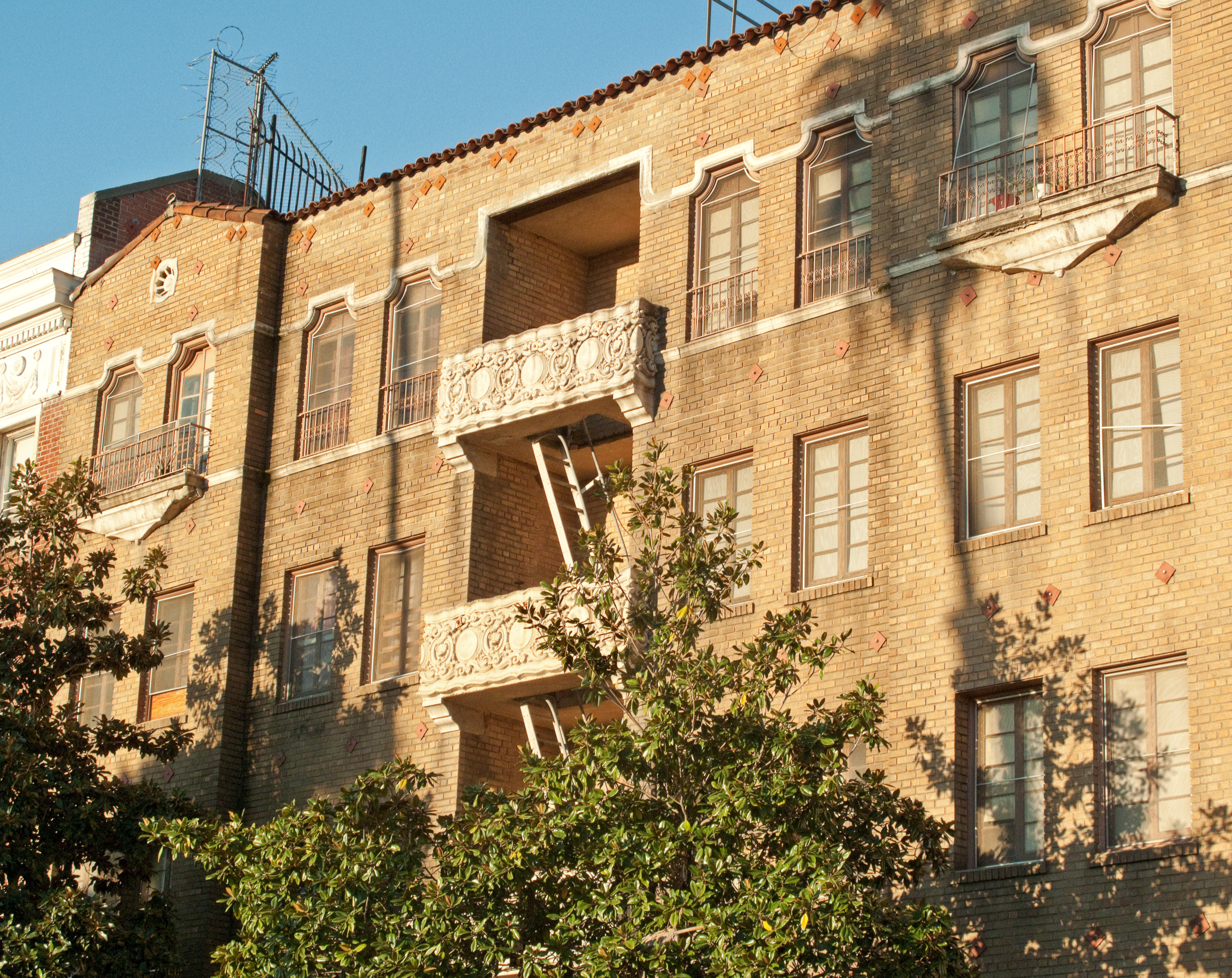
The Los Angeles building used to depict the exterior of Jerry's apartment building at 129 West 81st Street, Manhattan

The show premiered as The Seinfeld Chronicles on July 5, 1989. After it aired, a pickup by NBC seemed unlikely, and the show was offered to Fox, which declined to pick it up. Rick Ludwin, head of late night and special events for NBC, however, diverted money from his budget by canceling a Bob Hope television special, and the next four episodes were filmed. These episodes were highly rated as they followed summer re-runs of Cheers on Thursdays at 9:30 p.m., and the series was finally picked up. At one point, NBC considered airing these episodes on Saturdays at 10:30 p.m. but gave the slot to a short-lived sitcom called FM instead. The series was renamed simply Seinfeld as a precautionary measure due to the failure of the short-lived 1990 ABC series with a similarly sounding title, The Marshall Chronicles. After airing the remaining four episodes of its first season the summer of 1990, NBC ordered 13 more episodes. David believed that he and Seinfeld had no more stories to tell and advised Seinfeld to turn down the order, but Seinfeld agreed to the additional episodes. Season 2 was bumped off its scheduled premiere of January 16, 1991, due to the outbreak of the Persian Gulf War. It settled into a regular time slot on Wednesdays at 9:30 p.m. and eventually flipped with veteran series Night Court to 9 p.m.

TV critics championed Seinfeld in its early seasons, even as it was slow to cultivate a substantial audience. For the first three seasons, Jerry's stand-up comedy act would bookend at the beginning and end of each episode, even functioning as transitions during the show. A few episodes set a benchmark for later seasons. "The Deal" establishes Jerry and Elaine's relationship by setting rules about having sex while remaining friends. "The Parking Garage" was the first episode shot with no audience for the episode and, after "The Chinese Restaurant", to not show Jerry's apartment. "The Keys" contains a crossover to CBS show Murphy Brown, marking the first such cooperation between rival networks. "The Busboy" introduces George, Kramer and Elaine as having their own storylines for the first time. Although Castle Rock Entertainment's Glenn Padnick thought Seinfeld was too generous, showcasing his co-stars' comedic talent became a trademark throughout the series.

Larry Charles wrote an episode for Season 2, "The Bet", in which Elaine buys a gun from Kramer's friend. This episode was not filmed because the content was deemed unacceptable, and it was replaced by the episode "The Phone Message". "The Stranded", which aired during Season 3, was initially intended for Season 2. At the beginning of this episode, Jerry clears up the continuity error over George's real estate job.

=== Seasons 4–5 ===
Season 4 marked the sitcom's entry into the Nielsen ratings Top 30. It contains several of the most popular episodes, such as "The Bubble Boy", in which George and the bubble boy argue over Trivial Pursuit, and "The Junior Mint" in which Jerry and Kramer accidentally fumble a mint in the operating room. This was the first season to use a story arc of Jerry and George creating their own sitcom, Jerry. Also, at this time, the use of Jerry's stand-up act slowly declined, and the stand-up segment in the middle of Seinfeld episodes was cut.

Much publicity followed the controversial episode "The Contest", an Emmy Award-winning episode written by David, whose subject matter was considered inappropriate for prime-time network TV. To circumvent this taboo, the word "masturbation" was never used in the script, instead substituted for by a variety of oblique references. Midway through that season, Seinfeld was moved from its original 9:00 p.m. time slot on Wednesdays to 9:30 p.m. on Thursdays, following Cheers again, which gave the show even more popularity. Ratings also sparked the move, as Tim Allen's sitcom Home Improvement on ABC had aired at the same time, and Home Improvement kept beating Seinfeld in the ratings. NBC moved the series after Ted Danson announced the end of Cheers and Seinfeld quickly surpassed the ratings of the 9:00 p.m. Cheers reruns that spring. The show won an Emmy Award for Outstanding Comedy Series in 1993, beating out its family-oriented, time-slot competitor Home Improvement, which was only in its second season on rival network ABC.

Season 5 was an even bigger ratings hit, consisting of popular episodes, such as "The Puffy Shirt", in which Jerry feels embarrassed wearing a "pirate" shirt on The Today Show, "The Non-Fat Yogurt" featuring Rudy Giuliani, the Republican then-mayor-elect of New York, and "The Opposite" in which George, doing the opposite of what his instincts tell him he should do, lands a job with the New York Yankees and Elaine leaves "Pendant Publishing" because of a comedy of errors that led to its demise. Another story arc has George returning to live with his parents. Amid the story arc, Kramer creates and promotes his coffee table book. The show was again nominated for Outstanding Comedy Series, but lost to the Cheers spin-off Frasier, then in its first season. Seinfeld was nominated for the same award every year for its entire run but, after its win at the 45th Primetime Emmy Awards in 1994, always lost to Frasier, which went on to win a record 39 Emmy Awards in its 11-season run.

=== Seasons 6–7 ===
In Season 6, Andy Ackerman replaced Tom Cherones as director of the show. The series remained well regarded and produced some of its most famous episodes, such as "The Beard", in which Jerry is put through a lie detector test to make him admit that he watched Melrose Place; "The Switch", in which Kramer's mom, Babs, reveals that his first name is Cosmo; and "The Understudy", in which Elaine meets J. Peterman for the first time. Story arcs used in this season were Elaine working as a personal assistant to her eccentric boss Justin Pitt and George's parents' temporary separation. This was the first season in which Seinfeld reached No. 1 in the Nielsen Ratings. The use of Jerry's stand-up act declined, and the end stand-up segment no longer appeared because the storylines for all four characters grew denser.

In Season 7, a story arc involved George getting engaged to his ex-girlfriend, Susan Ross, after the pilot Jerry proved unsuccessful. In it, George spends most of the season regretting and trying to get out of the engagement. Along with the regular half-hour episodes, two notable one-hour episodes were "The Cadillac", in which George plans to date award-winning actress Marisa Tomei, and "The Bottle Deposit", with Elaine and Sue Ellen Mischke participating in a bidding war to buy JFK's golf clubs in an auction.

=== Seasons 8–9 ===
Seinfeld's final two seasons were considered distinct from the earlier seasons. Most noticeably, David left the writing crew (but returned to write "The Finale" in 1998), resulting in Seinfeld taking over David's duties as showrunner, and, under the direction of a new writing staff, Seinfeld became a faster-paced show. The show no longer contained extracts of Jerry performing stand-up comedy—Jerry had no time or energy for this with his new responsibilities—and storylines occasionally delved into fantasy and broad humor. For example, in "The Bizarro Jerry", Elaine is torn between exact opposites of her friends and Jerry dates a woman who has the now-famous "man hands". Some notable episodes from Season 8 include "The Little Kicks", showing Elaine's horrible dancing, and "The Chicken Roaster", which portrays the Kenny Rogers Roasters chicken restaurant, which opened during that time. A story arc in this season involves Peterman going to Burma in "The Foundation" until he recovered from a nervous breakdown in "The Money", followed by Elaine writing Peterman's biography in "The Van Buren Boys", which leads to Kramer's parody of Kenny Kramer's Reality Tour seen in "The Muffin Tops".

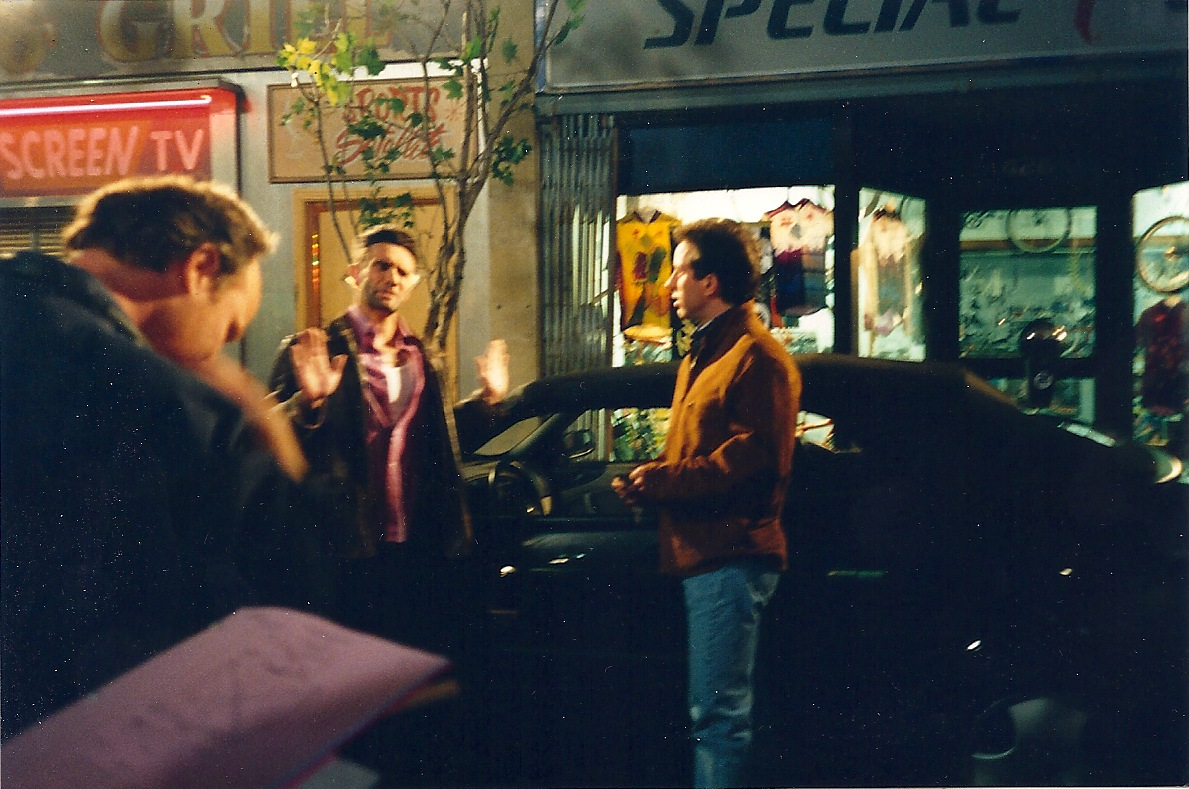
A scene being filmed from "The Maid"

The final season included episodes like "The Merv Griffin Show", in which Kramer converts his apartment into a talk-show studio and plays the character of talk-show host, "The Betrayal" that presents in reverse chronological order what happened to Sue Ellen's wedding in India, and "The Frogger" in which George pushes a Frogger machine across the street, mimicking the action of the game itself. The last season included a story arc in which Elaine has an on/off relationship with Puddy. Despite the enormous popularity and willingness of the cast to return for a tenth season, Seinfeld decided to end the show after Season 9, believing he would thereby be able to ensure the show would maintain its quality and go out on top. NBC offered Seinfeld $110 million—a record $5 million an episode for a 22-episode tenth season—but he declined.

A controversy caused in the ninth season was the accidental burning of a Puerto Rican flag by Kramer in "The Puerto Rican Day". This scene caused a furor among Puerto Ricans, and as a result, NBC showed this episode only once. Seinfeld defused the protestors by not letting this episode continue in syndication, as revealed in "Inside Look" on DVD. However, the episode would be added to the syndicated rerun package several years later uncut.

=== Series finale ===
After nine years on the air, NBC and Seinfeld announced on December 25, 1997, that the series would end production the following spring in 1998. The announcement made the front page of the major New York newspapers, including The New York Times. Seinfeld was featured on the cover of Time magazine's first issue of 1998. The series ended with a 75-minute episode (cut to 60 minutes in syndication, in two parts) written by co-creator and ex-executive producer Larry David, which aired on May 14, 1998. Before the finale, a 45-minute retrospective clip show, "The Clip Show", was aired. The retrospective was expanded to an hour after the original airing and aired again on NBC as an hour-long episode, and has since aired in syndication.

It was the first episode since the finale of season 7, "The Invitations", to feature opening and closing stand-up comedy acts by Seinfeld. The finale was filmed before an audience of NBC executives and friends of the show. The press and public were shut out of the taping to keep its plot secret; those who attended the shoot of the final episode were required to sign written "vows of silence". The secrecy only seemed to increase speculation about how the series would end. The episode's producers gave false information to the media, spreading a rumor about Newman ending up in the hospital and Jerry and Elaine sitting in a chapel, presumably to marry.

The final episode enjoyed a historic audience, estimated at 76.3 million viewers (58% of all viewers that night) making it the fourth-most watched regular series finale in U.S. TV history, behind M*A*S*H, Cheers and The Fugitive. However, the finale received mixed reviews from critics and fans of the show. The finale poked fun at the many rumors that were circulating, seeming to move into multiple supposed plots before settling on its actual storyline—a lengthy trial where the gang is prosecuted for violating a "Duty to Rescue" law and sentenced to prison terms.

According to Forbes magazine, Seinfeld's earnings from the show in 1998 came to US$267 million, including syndication earnings. He refused NBC's offer of $5 million per episode, or over $100 million total, to continue into a tenth season. The offer NBC made to Seinfeld was over three times higher per episode than anyone on TV had ever been offered before. Seinfeld told the network that he was not married nor had children, and wished to focus on his personal life. As reported in July 2007, he was the second-highest earner in the TV industry, earning at the time $60 million a year. The episode became the first to command over $1 million a minute for advertising—a mark previously attained only by the Super Bowl.

== Reception and legacy ==
Elizabeth Magnotta and Alexandra Strohl analyze the success of Seinfeld with recourse to the incongruity theory of humor: "The Incongruity Theory claims that humor is created out of a violation of an expectation. For humor to result from this unexpected result, the event must have an appropriate emotional climate, comprised of the setting, characters, prior discourse, relationships of the characters, and the topic." Specifically, Magnotta and Strohl focus on "The Marine Biologist", where George is embroiled in yet another lie, and on "The Red Dot", where George tries to save a few dollars at Elaine's expense by giving her a marked-down cashmere sweater.

In "Translating Seinfeld", Jennifer Armstrong observes that Seinfeld is less famous among non-English speakers as its unique style of humor is "too cultural and word-based to make for easy translation". Carol Iannone sums up the legacy of this American hit in her Modern Age article "Seinfeld: The Politically Incorrect Comedy" when she says, "It may be the first situation comedy truly to achieve the status of art." Nod Miller, of the University of East London, has discussed the self-referential qualities of the show:

Seinfeld is suffused with postmodern themes. To begin with, the boundary between reality and fiction is frequently blurred: this is illustrated in the central device of having Jerry Seinfeld play the character Jerry Seinfeld. In the show's fourth season, several episodes revolved around the narrative of Jerry and George (whose character is co-creator Larry David's alter ego) pitching 'a show about nothing' based on the everyday life of a stand-up comedian to NBC. The reaction of the fictional NBC executives, by all accounts, mirrored the initial responses of those who eventually commissioned Seinfeld. The fourth season ends with "The Pilot", an episode focusing on the casting, taping and screening of the show-within-the-show, Jerry. This episode also illustrates neatly the self-referential quality which is one of Seinfeld's hallmarks. The series finale was so replete with references to earlier shows as to render it largely incomprehensible to those not already well-versed in the personae and preoccupations of the Seinfeld universe.

William Irwin has edited an anthology of scholarly essays on philosophy in Seinfeld and Philosophy: A Book about Everything and Nothing. Some entries include "The Jerry Problem and the Socratic Problem", "George's Failed Quest for Happiness: An Aristotelian Analysis", "Elaine's Moral Character", "Kramer the 'Seducer'", "Making Something Out of Nothing: Seinfeld, Sophistry and the Tao", "Seinfeld, Subjectivity, and Sartre", "Mr. Peterman, the Wicked Witch of the West, and Me" and "Minimally Decent Samaritans and Uncommon Law".

=== U.S. television ratings ===
TV viewership in the United States
Season	TV season	Episodes	Timeslot	Original air dates		Nielsen ratings			Most watched episode	
Season	TV season	Episodes	Timeslot	Season premiere	Season finale	Rank	Rating	Viewers (millions)	Title	Viewers (millions)
1	1989–90	5	Wednesday at 9:30 pm (Episode 1); Thursday at 9:30 pm (Episodes 2–5)	July 5, 1989	June 21, 1990	—N/a	—N/a	19.26	"The Stake Out"	22.5
2	1990–91	12	Wednesday at 9:30 pm (Episodes 1–4, 12); Thursday at 9:30 pm (Episodes 5–11)	January 23, 1991	June 26, 1991	—N/a	—N/a	18.07	"The Apartment"	24.7
3	1991–92	23	Wednesday at 9:30 pm (Episodes 1–11, 18); Wednesday at 9:00 pm (Episodes 12–17, 19–23)	September 18, 1991	May 6, 1992	#42	12.5	17.66	"The Letter"	22.3
4	1992–93	24	Wednesday at 9:00 pm (Episodes 1–3, 5–15); Wednesday at 9:30 pm (Episode 4); Thursday at 9:30 pm (Episodes 16–22); Thursday at 8:00 pm (Episode 23); Thursday at 8:30 pm (Episode 24)	August 12, 1992	May 20, 1993	#25	13.7	20.91	"The Pilot"	32.8
5	1993–94	22	Thursday at 9:00 pm	September 16, 1993	May 19, 1994	#3	19.6	29.59	"The Stall" and "The Marine Biologist"	35.0
6	1994–95	24	Thursday at 9:00 pm	September 22, 1994	May 18, 1995	#1	20.6	30.06	"The Switch"	36.6
7	1995–96	24	Thursday at 9:00 pm	September 21, 1995	May 16, 1996	#2	21.2	33.19	"The Engagement"	37.6
8	1996–97	22	Thursday at 9:00 pm	September 19, 1996	May 15, 1997	#2	20.5	32.48	"The Money"	37.34
9	1997–98	24	Thursday at 9:00 pm	September 25, 1997	May 14, 1998	#1	22.0	38.03 (32.15)	"The Finale" ("The Puerto Rican Day")	76.26 (38.78)

=== Awards and honors ===
Seinfeld has received awards and nominations in various categories throughout the mid-1990s. It was awarded the Primetime Emmy Award for Outstanding Comedy Series in 1993, Golden Globe Award for Best Television Series – Musical or Comedy in 1994, and Actor Award for Outstanding Performance by an Ensemble in a Comedy Series in 1995, 1997 and 1998. The show also received the Peabody Award in 1993.

TV Guide named it the greatest TV show of all time in 2002, and in 2013, the magazine ranked it as the second-greatest TV show. A 2015 The Hollywood Reporter survey of 2,800 actors, producers, directors, and other industry people named Seinfeld as their #5 favorite show. In 2022, Rolling Stone ranked Seinfeld as the sixth-greatest TV show of all time. In 2023, Variety ranked Seinfeld as the eighth-greatest TV show of all time.

== Distribution ==
Free streaming service Channel 4 has been running Seinfeld in its original 4:3 format since February 2020. On April 29, 2015, it was officially announced, during Hulu's upfronts presentation in New York, that all nine seasons of Seinfeld would stream on the platform starting in June 2015. The deal was for around $130 million to $180 million. On May 20, 2015, Hulu announced that every episode would be available starting June 24, 2015. Hulu's streaming rights for the series expired on June 23, 2021. In January 2017, Amazon acquired the UK rights to all seasons of Seinfeld for its Amazon Prime Video streaming service.

On November 8, 2016, the Australian streaming service Stan announced via Twitter that later in the week all episodes would be available to stream for the first time in Australia. All episodes were available from November 11, 2016, with the remastered versions of all episodes on the service featuring HD and Widescreen enhancements. The widescreen offered was cropped from the original 4:3 format negatives, thus resulting in better visual quality than the previously available DVD version, however, the top and bottom portions of the frame were cut out to achieve the widescreen aspect ratio. In April 2020, all seasons of Seinfeld were also made available on-demand via pay television service Foxtel, as well as its internet-based alternative Foxtel Now.

In September 2019, Netflix and Sony Pictures announced that Netflix had acquired the exclusive global streaming rights for Seinfeld, starting on October 1, 2021, superseding the above Hulu and Amazon rights. As of 2026, Netflix's version of Seinfeld is available in 4K resolution. The transition was criticized as the show, initially displayed in 4:3 aspect ratio, had been converted to 16:9, resulting in some gags getting cropped, similarly to how The Simpsons was initially rendered on Disney+. Netflix has yet to comment on this situation. Also, Netflix & Paramount extended Seinfeld licensing deals to continue streaming on Netflix until 2031.

=== Home media releases ===
The hour-long, two-part clip show episode "The Highlights of 100" became the first Seinfeld episode available on home video when it was released on VHS in 1995 by food company General Mills. Sony Pictures Home Entertainment (formerly Columbia TriStar Home Entertainment) released all nine seasons of Seinfeld on DVD in Regions 1, 2 and 4 between 2004 and 2007. On November 6, 2007, Seinfeld: The Complete Series was released on DVD. The complete series box set includes a 2007 "roundtable" reunion of the four main cast members and Larry David; only highlights of this were also included in the Season 9 set.

The first complete series box set in Australia (Region 4) was released on October 24, 2007. The second boxset was released on December 2, 2008, and was a Collectible Fridge design packaging. On August 5, 2009, another Limited-Edition boxset was released, similar to the first boxset but does not include the book and the packaging was slightly different. On November 23, 2011, an additional Limited-Edition boxset was released. On November 14, 2018, a Festivus Celebration Edition was released which contained napkins and cups, playing cards and thumb wrestle gadgets. On August 12, 2020, yet another Complete Series boxset was released.

The entire series was released on Blu-ray (in the cropped 16:9 aspect ratio) and 4K Ultra HD Blu-ray (in the original 4:3 aspect ratio) on December 17, 2024.

DVD name	Release dates		
DVD name	Region 1	Region 2	Region 4
Vol 1: Seasons 1 & 2	November 23, 2004	November 1, 2004	October 13, 2004
Vol 2: Season 3	November 23, 2004	November 1, 2004	October 18, 2004
Vol 3: Season 4	May 17, 2005	June 13, 2005	May 25, 2005
Vol 4: Season 5	November 22, 2005	November 28, 2005	November 23, 2005
Vol 5: Season 6	November 22, 2005	November 28, 2005	November 23, 2005
Vol 6: Season 7	November 21, 2006	November 20, 2006	November 8, 2006
Vol 7: Season 8	June 5, 2007	June 4, 2007	June 13, 2007
Vol 8: Season 9	November 6, 2007	November 19, 2007	October 24, 2007
Complete Series (Original)	November 6, 2007	—N/a	—N/a
Complete Series (Reissue)	November 5, 2013	October 9, 2018	—N/a

=== Syndication ===
According to Barry Meyer, chairman of Warner Bros. Entertainment (parent company of Castle Rock Entertainment), Seinfeld made $2.7 billion through June 2010 through off-network syndication and cable syndication. As of February 2017 the show had made an estimated $4.06 billion in syndication. Steve Bannon, who invested in the show, later said, "We calculated what it would get us if it made it to syndication. We were wrong by a factor of five". In September 2019, it was announced that Viacom had acquired cable syndication rights to the series from TBS, with it airing on Comedy Central from October 2021, to July 2025, Nick at Nite from May 31, 2022, until November 12, 2022, and TV Land since February 11, 2023.

=== High-definition versions ===
There are two high-definition versions of Seinfeld. The first is that of the network television (non-syndicated) versions in the original aspect ratio of 4:3 that were downscaled for the DVD releases. Clips from this high-definition version in its upscale were seen on NBC during The 'Seinfeld' Story special. Syndicated broadcast stations and the cable networks TBS and Comedy Central (and also Fox) began airing the syndicated version of Seinfeld in HD. Unlike the version used for the DVD, Sony Pictures cropped the top and bottom parts of the frame while restoring previously cropped images on the sides from the 35mm film source to use the entire 16:9 frame.

== After Seinfeld ==
=== Unproduced spin-off ===
Phil Morris pitched a Jackie Chiles spin-off show with Seinfeld and David signed as executive producers and hoped for a midseason 1999 premiere, but it never came to fruition. NBC claimed that it was never discussed.

=== Another scene ===
On the November 1, 2007, episode of The Daily Show with Jon Stewart, Jerry Seinfeld mentioned the possibility of shooting one last scene after the characters leave jail. He mentioned that he was too busy to do it at the time, but did not announce what the scene would entail, as its production is not a certainty. In a commentary from the final season DVD, Seinfeld outlines that he and Jason Alexander spoke about this scene being in Monk's Cafe, with George saying "That was brutal" about the foursome's stint in prison.

On an episode of Saturday Night Live that Jerry Seinfeld hosted on October 2, 1999, a sketch was produced that showed what life was like for Jerry behind bars after being transferred to the fictional prison portrayed on the HBO series Oz. The roughly four-minute sketch shows the opening credits for the HBO series with clips of Jerry mixed in doing various activities around the prison. The sketch continues and mixes in different storylines from both Oz and Seinfeld and has Jerry interacting with various characters from the show in his typical quick-witted, sarcastic way.

=== The Seinfeld "curse" ===
Louis-Dreyfus, Alexander, and Richards have all tried to launch new sitcoms as title-role characters. Almost every show was canceled quickly, usually within the first season. This gave rise to the term Seinfeld curse: the failure of a sitcom starring one of the three, despite the conventional wisdom that each person's Seinfeld popularity should almost guarantee a strong, built-in audience for the actor's new show. Shows specifically cited regarding the Seinfeld curse are Julia Louis-Dreyfus's Watching Ellie, Jason Alexander's Bob Patterson and Listen Up, and Michael Richards's The Michael Richards Show. This phenomenon was mentioned throughout the second season of Larry David's HBO program Curb Your Enthusiasm, which aired in 2001. In real life, David has repeatedly dismissed the idea of a curse, saying, "It's so completely idiotic. It's very hard to have a successful sitcom."

The success of Louis-Dreyfus in the 2006–2010 CBS sitcom The New Adventures of Old Christine, which included winning the Primetime Emmy Award for Outstanding Lead Actress in a Comedy Series in 2006, led many to believe that she had broken the curse. In her acceptance speech, Louis-Dreyfus held up her award and exclaimed, "I'm not somebody who really believes in curses, but curse this, baby!" The show produced enough episodes to air in reruns in syndication for several years, something the other shows did not achieve. The Saturday Night Live episode hosted by Louis-Dreyfus made references to the curse. Nevertheless, the series' ratings declined soon after, and it was canceled after the fifth season. She went on to win six further Emmys (for Lead Actress in a Comedy Series) for her acclaimed performance as Vice President Selina Meyer in the HBO comedy series Veep.

=== Curb Your Enthusiasm ===
Early in March 2009, it was announced that the Seinfeld cast would reunite for season seven of Curb Your Enthusiasm. The cast first appeared in the third episode of the season, all playing fictional versions of themselves. The season-long story is that Larry David tries to initiate a Seinfeld reunion show as a ploy to win back his ex-wife, Cheryl. Along with the four main characters, some Seinfeld supporting actors like Wayne Knight, Estelle Harris and Steve Hytner appeared in the ninth episode at a table read for the reunion show. Although much dialogue in Curb Your Enthusiasm is improvised, the plot was scripted, and the Seinfeld special that aired within the show was scripted and directed by Seinfeld regular Andy Ackerman, making this the first time since Seinfeld went off the air that the central cast appeared together in a scripted show.

=== Comedians in Cars Getting Coffee ===
Jerry Seinfeld, Jason Alexander, and Wayne Knight, playing their respective Seinfeld characters, appeared in a spot presented during halftime of Super Bowl XLVIII on February 2, 2014. Fox came up with the idea of doing such a spot, due in part to the Super Bowl's location being New York City adjacent that year. An uncut version appeared on Crackle.com immediately afterward, as an episode of Comedians in Cars Getting Coffee titled "The Over-Cheer", establishing Seinfeld's character on the series as an older version of his Seinfeld character. Although the spot was used to advertise Seinfeld's web series, it was not considered a commercial, as Sony, which produces the series, did not pay for it. While Seinfeld indicated that the webisode would probably be the last cast reunion, saying, "I have a feeling you've seen the final coda on that very unique experience," since then, Michael Richards and Julia Louis-Dreyfus have also appeared in episodes.
