= List of Seinfeld episodes =

Seinfeld is an American television sitcom created by Jerry Seinfeld and Larry David. Seinfeld has been described by some as a "show about nothing", similar to the self-parodying "show within a show" of fourth-season episode "The Pilot". Jerry Seinfeld is the lead character and played as a fictionalized version of himself. Set predominantly in an apartment block on New York City's Upper West Side, the show features a host of Jerry's friends and acquaintances, which include George Costanza, Elaine Benes, and Cosmo Kramer, who are portrayed by Jason Alexander, Julia Louis-Dreyfus, and Michael Richards, respectively.

The series debuted on July 5, 1989, on NBC, as The Seinfeld Chronicles. The pilot episode was met with poor reviews, and as a result, NBC passed on the show. However, NBC executive Rick Ludwin believed that the series had potential and therefore gave Seinfeld a budget to create four more episodes, which formed the rest of season 1 and began airing on May 31, 1990. The first season is considered the smallest sitcom order in television history. During its nine-year run, 180 episodes of Seinfeld were produced. The count includes both halves of three one-hour episodes, including the finale, and two retrospective episodes, each split into two parts: "The Highlights of 100", covering the first 100 episodes; and "The Clip Show", also known as "The Chronicle", which aired before the series finale. On November 25, 2004, a special titled The Seinfeld Story was broadcast. This marked the first appearance of Seinfeld on NBC since its series finale in 1998. All nine seasons are available on DVD, Blu-ray and Ultra HD Blu-ray, and the show is still re-run regularly in syndication. The final episode aired on May 14, 1998. The streaming rights for all 180 episodes of the series transferred from Hulu to Netflix in 2021.

== Series overview ==
| Season | Episodes | Originally released | | Rank | Rating | Viewers (millions) |
| Season | Episodes | First released | Last released | Rank | Rating | Viewers (millions) |
|---|---|---|---|---|---|---|
| 1 | 5 | July 5, 1989 | June 21, 1990 | —N/a | —N/a | 19.2 |
| 2 | 12 | January 23, 1991 | June 26, 1991 | 46 | 12.5 | 18.1 |
| 3 | 23 | September 18, 1991 | May 6, 1992 | 43 | 12.5 | 17.7 |
| 4 | 24 | August 12, 1992 | May 20, 1993 | 25 | 13.7 | 20.9 |
| 5 | 22 | September 16, 1993 | May 19, 1994 | 3 | 19.4 | 29.4 |
| 6 | 24 | September 22, 1994 | May 18, 1995 | 1 | 20.6 | 31.3 |
| 7 | 24 | September 21, 1995 | May 16, 1996 | 2 | 21.2 | 33.2 |
| 8 | 22 | September 19, 1996 | May 15, 1997 | 2 | 20.5 | 32.3 |
| 9 | 24 | September 25, 1997 | May 14, 1998 | 1 | 22.0 | 35.5 |

== Episodes ==
=== Season 1 (1989–90) ===
| No. overall | No. in season | Title | Directed by | Written by | Original release date | Prod. code | US viewers (millions) |
|---|---|---|---|---|---|---|---|
| 1 | 1 | "The Seinfeld Chronicles" | Art Wolff | Larry David & Jerry Seinfeld | July 5, 1989 | 101 | 15.4 |
| 2 | 2 | "The Stake Out" | Tom Cherones | Larry David & Jerry Seinfeld | May 31, 1990 | 103 | 22.5 |
| 3 | 3 | "The Robbery" | Tom Cherones | Matt Goldman | June 7, 1990 | 104 | 19.7 |
| 4 | 4 | "Male Unbonding" | Tom Cherones | Larry David & Jerry Seinfeld | June 14, 1990 | 102 | 19.1 |
| 5 | 5 | "The Stock Tip" | Tom Cherones | Larry David & Jerry Seinfeld | June 21, 1990 | 105 | 19.4 |

=== Season 2 (1991) ===
| No. overall | No. in season | Title | Directed by | Written by | Original release date | Prod. code | US viewers (millions) |
|---|---|---|---|---|---|---|---|
| 6 | 1 | "The Ex-Girlfriend" | Tom Cherones | Larry David & Jerry Seinfeld | January 23, 1991 | 201 | 15.6 |
| 7 | 2 | "The Pony Remark" | Tom Cherones | Larry David & Jerry Seinfeld | January 30, 1991 | 202 | 15.2 |
| 8 | 3 | "The Jacket" | Tom Cherones | Larry David & Jerry Seinfeld | February 6, 1991 | 205 | 14.8 |
| 9 | 4 | "The Phone Message" | Tom Cherones | Larry David & Jerry Seinfeld | February 13, 1991 | 207 | 13.6 |
| 10 | 5 | "The Apartment" | Tom Cherones | Peter Mehlman | April 4, 1991 | 208 | 24.7 |
| 11 | 6 | "The Statue" | Tom Cherones | Larry Charles | April 11, 1991 | 210 | 23.3 |
| 12 | 7 | "The Revenge" | Tom Cherones | Larry David | April 18, 1991 | 212 | 19.6 |
| 13 | 8 | "The Heart Attack" | Tom Cherones | Larry Charles | April 25, 1991 | 211 | 20.6 |
| 14 | 9 | "The Deal" | Tom Cherones | Larry David | May 2, 1991 | 213 | 22.9 |
| 15 | 10 | "The Baby Shower" | Tom Cherones | Larry Charles | May 16, 1991 | 204 | 17.2 |
| 16 | 11 | "The Chinese Restaurant" | Tom Cherones | Larry David & Jerry Seinfeld | May 23, 1991 | 206 | 16.8 |
| 17 | 12 | "The Busboy" | Tom Cherones | Larry David & Jerry Seinfeld | June 26, 1991 | 203 | 12.5 |

"The Bet" is an unproduced episode of Seinfeld which was supposed to air in place of Episode 4 this season.

=== Season 3 (1991–92) ===
| No. overall | No. in season | Title | Directed by | Written by | Original release date | Prod. code | US viewers (millions) |
|---|---|---|---|---|---|---|---|
| 18 | 1 | "The Note" | Tom Cherones | Larry David | September 18, 1991 | 301 | 21.7 |
| 19 | 2 | "The Truth" | David Steinberg | Elaine Pope | September 25, 1991 | 302 | 16.7 |
| 20 | 3 | "The Pen" | Tom Cherones | Larry David | October 2, 1991 | 305 | 15.1 |
| 21 | 4 | "The Dog" | Tom Cherones | Larry David | October 9, 1991 | 303 | 17.2 |
| 22 | 5 | "The Library" | Joshua White | Larry Charles | October 16, 1991 | 304 | 16.4 |
| 23 | 6 | "The Parking Garage" | Tom Cherones | Larry David | October 30, 1991 | 306 | 17.0 |
| 24 | 7 | "The Café" | Tom Cherones | Tom Leopold | November 6, 1991 | 307 | 16.4 |
| 25 | 8 | "The Tape" | David Steinberg | Larry David and Bob Shaw & Don McEnery | November 13, 1991 | 308 | 15.8 |
| 26 | 9 | "The Nose Job" | Tom Cherones | Peter Mehlman | November 20, 1991 | 309 | 16.3 |
| 27 | 10 | "The Stranded" | Tom Cherones | Larry David & Jerry Seinfeld and Matt Goldman | November 27, 1991 | 209 | 18.6 |
| 28 | 11 | "The Alternate Side" | Tom Cherones | Larry David and Bill Masters | December 4, 1991 | 310 | 18.0 |
| 29 | 12 | "The Red Dot" | Tom Cherones | Larry David | December 11, 1991 | 311 | 17.9 |
| 30 | 13 | "The Subway" | Tom Cherones | Larry Charles | January 8, 1992 | 313 | 18.7 |
| 31 | 14 | "The Pez Dispenser" | Tom Cherones | Larry David | January 15, 1992 | 314 | 19.2 |
| 32 | 15 | "The Suicide" | Tom Cherones | Tom Leopold | January 29, 1992 | 312 | 16.9 |
| 33 | 16 | "The Fix-Up" | Tom Cherones | Elaine Pope & Larry Charles | February 5, 1992 | 317 | 18.5 |
| 34 | 17 | "The Boyfriend" | Tom Cherones | Larry David and Larry Levin | February 12, 1992 | 315 | 17.0 |
| 35 | 18 | "The Boyfriend" | Tom Cherones | Larry David and Larry Levin | February 12, 1992 | 316 | 17.0 |
| 36 | 19 | "The Limo" | Tom Cherones | Story by : Marc Jaffe; Teleplay by : Larry Charles | February 26, 1992 | 318 | 19.5 |
| 37 | 20 | "The Good Samaritan" | Jason Alexander | Peter Mehlman | March 4, 1992 | 319 | 16.1 |
| 38 | 21 | "The Letter" | Tom Cherones | Larry David | March 25, 1992 | 320 | 22.3 |
| 39 | 22 | "The Parking Space" | Tom Cherones | Larry David and Greg Daniels | April 22, 1992 | 322 | 17.8 |
| 40 | 23 | "The Keys" | Tom Cherones | Larry Charles | May 6, 1992 | 321 | 16.4 |

=== Season 4 (1992–93) ===
| No. overall | No. in season | Title | Directed by | Written by | Original release date | Prod. code | US viewers (millions) |
|---|---|---|---|---|---|---|---|
| 41 | 1 | "The Trip" | Tom Cherones | Larry Charles | August 12, 1992 | 401 | 16.3 |
| 42 | 2 | "The Trip" | Tom Cherones | Larry Charles | August 19, 1992 | 402 | 15.1 |
| 43 | 3 | "The Pitch" | Tom Cherones | Larry David | September 16, 1992 | 403 | 17.6 |
| 44 | 4 | "The Ticket" | Tom Cherones | Larry David | September 16, 1992 | 404 | 17.6 |
| 45 | 5 | "The Wallet" | Tom Cherones | Larry David | September 23, 1992 | 405 | 17.6 |
| 46 | 6 | "The Watch" | Tom Cherones | Larry David | September 30, 1992 | 406 | 15.2 |
| 47 | 7 | "The Bubble Boy" | Tom Cherones | Larry David & Larry Charles | October 7, 1992 | 407 | 17.1 |
| 48 | 8 | "The Cheever Letters" | Tom Cherones | Story by : Larry David and Elaine Pope & Tom Leopold; Teleplay by : Larry David | October 28, 1992 | 408 | 15.1 |
| 49 | 9 | "The Opera" | Tom Cherones | Larry Charles | November 4, 1992 | 409 | 16.7 |
| 50 | 10 | "The Virgin" | Tom Cherones | Story by : Peter Mehlman and Peter Farrelly & Bob Farrelly; Teleplay by : Peter Mehlman | November 11, 1992 | 410 | 16.2 |
| 51 | 11 | "The Contest" | Tom Cherones | Larry David | November 18, 1992 | 411 | 18.5 |
| 52 | 12 | "The Airport" | Tom Cherones | Larry Charles | November 25, 1992 | 412 | 14.5 |
| 53 | 13 | "The Pick" | Tom Cherones | Story by : Larry David and Marc Jaffe; Teleplay by : Larry David | December 16, 1992 | 413 | 16.2 |
| 54 | 14 | "The Movie" | Tom Cherones | Steve Skrovan & Bill Masters & Jon Hayman | January 6, 1993 | 415 | 17.6 |
| 55 | 15 | "The Visa" | Tom Cherones | Peter Mehlman | January 27, 1993 | 414 | N/A |
| 56 | 16 | "The Shoes" | Tom Cherones | Larry David & Jerry Seinfeld | February 4, 1993 | 417 | 26.9 |
| 57 | 17 | "The Outing" | Tom Cherones | Larry Charles | February 11, 1993 | 416 | 28.0 |
| 58 | 18 | "The Old Man" | Tom Cherones | Story by : Bruce Kirschbaum; Teleplay by : Larry Charles | February 18, 1993 | 418 | 22.7 |
| 59 | 19 | "The Implant" | Tom Cherones | Peter Mehlman | February 25, 1993 | 419 | 27.4 |
| 60 | 20 | "The Junior Mint" | Tom Cherones | Andy Robin | March 18, 1993 | 421 | 26.4 |
| 61 | 21 | "The Smelly Car" | Tom Cherones | Larry David & Peter Mehlman | April 15, 1993 | 422 | 25.0 |
| 62 | 22 | "The Handicap Spot" | Tom Cherones | Larry David | May 13, 1993 | 420 | 27.6 |
| 63 | 23 | "The Pilot" | Tom Cherones | Larry David | May 20, 1993 | 423 | 32.8 |
| 64 | 24 | "The Pilot" | Tom Cherones | Larry David | May 20, 1993 | 424 | 32.8 |

=== Season 5 (1993–94) ===
| No. overall | No. in season | Title | Directed by | Written by | Original release date | Prod. code | US viewers (millions) |
|---|---|---|---|---|---|---|---|
| 65 | 1 | "The Mango" | Tom Cherones | Story by : Lawrence H. Levy; Teleplay by : Lawrence H. Levy and Larry David | September 16, 1993 | 501 | 28.2 |
| 66 | 2 | "The Puffy Shirt" | Tom Cherones | Larry David | September 23, 1993 | 503 | 29.5 |
| 67 | 3 | "The Glasses" | Tom Cherones | Tom Gammill & Max Pross | September 30, 1993 | 502 | 28.7 |
| 68 | 4 | "The Sniffing Accountant" | Tom Cherones | Larry David & Jerry Seinfeld | October 7, 1993 | 504 | 28.4 |
| 69 | 5 | "The Bris" | Tom Cherones | Larry Charles | October 14, 1993 | 505 | 28.7 |
| 70 | 6 | "The Lip Reader" | Tom Cherones | Carol Leifer | October 28, 1993 | 506 | 31.0 |
| 71 | 7 | "The Non-Fat Yogurt" | Tom Cherones | Larry David | November 4, 1993 | 507 | 31.1 |
| 72 | 8 | "The Barber" | Tom Cherones | Andy Robin | November 11, 1993 | 508 | 29.7 |
| 73 | 9 | "The Masseuse" | Tom Cherones | Peter Mehlman | November 18, 1993 | 509 | 27.7 |
| 74 | 10 | "The Cigar Store Indian" | Tom Cherones | Tom Gammill & Max Pross | December 9, 1993 | 510 | 29.6 |
| 75 | 11 | "The Conversion" | Tom Cherones | Bruce Kirschbaum | December 16, 1993 | 511 | 28.3 |
| 76 | 12 | "The Stall" | Tom Cherones | Larry Charles | January 6, 1994 | 512 | 35.0 |
| 77 | 13 | "The Dinner Party" | Tom Cherones | Larry David | February 3, 1994 | 514 | 33.0 |
| 78 | 14 | "The Marine Biologist" | Tom Cherones | Ron Hauge & Charlie Rubin | February 10, 1994 | 513 | 35.0 |
| 79 | 15 | "The Pie" | Tom Cherones | Tom Gammill & Max Pross | February 17, 1994 | 515 | 25.4 |
| 80 | 16 | "The Stand-In" | Tom Cherones | Larry David | February 24, 1994 | 516 | 25.4 |
| 81 | 17 | "The Wife" | Tom Cherones | Peter Mehlman | March 17, 1994 | 517 | 30.7 |
| 82 | 18 | "The Raincoats" | Tom Cherones | Tom Gammill & Max Pross and Larry David & Jerry Seinfeld | April 28, 1994 | 519 | 29.6 |
| 83 | 19 | "The Raincoats" | Tom Cherones | Tom Gammill & Max Pross and Larry David & Jerry Seinfeld | April 28, 1994 | 520 | 29.6 |
| 84 | 20 | "The Fire" | Tom Cherones | Larry Charles | May 5, 1994 | 518 | 27.6 |
| 85 | 21 | "The Hamptons" | Tom Cherones | Peter Mehlman & Carol Leifer | May 12, 1994 | 522 | 24.5 |
| 86 | 22 | "The Opposite" | Tom Cherones | Andy Cowan and Larry David & Jerry Seinfeld | May 19, 1994 | 521 | 30.1 |

=== Season 6 (1994–95) ===
| No. overall | No. in season | Title | Directed by | Written by | Original release date | Prod. code | US viewers (millions) |
|---|---|---|---|---|---|---|---|
| 87 | 1 | "The Chaperone" | Andy Ackerman | Larry David and Bill Masters & Bob Shaw | September 22, 1994 | 601 | 32.8 |
| 88 | 2 | "The Big Salad" | Andy Ackerman | Larry David | September 29, 1994 | 602 | 32.4 |
| 89 | 3 | "The Pledge Drive" | Andy Ackerman | Tom Gammill & Max Pross | October 6, 1994 | 603 | 29.8 |
| 90 | 4 | "The Chinese Woman" | Andy Ackerman | Peter Mehlman | October 13, 1994 | 604 | 29.2 |
| 91 | 5 | "The Couch" | Andy Ackerman | Larry David | October 27, 1994 | 605 | 28.0 |
| 92 | 6 | "The Gymnast" | Andy Ackerman | Alec Berg & Jeff Schaffer | November 3, 1994 | 606 | 30.6 |
| 93 | 7 | "The Soup" | Andy Ackerman | Fred Stoller | November 10, 1994 | 608 | 29.6 |
| 94 | 8 | "The Mom & Pop Store" | Andy Ackerman | Tom Gammill & Max Pross | November 17, 1994 | 607 | 32.4 |
| 95 | 9 | "The Secretary" | David Owen Trainor | Carol Leifer & Marjorie Gross | December 8, 1994 | 609 | 29.7 |
| 96 | 10 | "The Race" | Andy Ackerman | Story by : Tom Gammill & Max Pross and Larry David & Sam Kass; Teleplay by : Tom Gammill & Max Pross and Larry David | December 15, 1994 | 612 | 26.8 |
| 97 | 11 | "The Switch" | Andy Ackerman | Bruce Kirschbaum and Sam Kass | January 5, 1995 | 610 | 36.6 |
| 98 | 12 | "The Label Maker" | Andy Ackerman | Alec Berg & Jeff Schaffer | January 19, 1995 | 611 | 36.2 |
| 99 | 13 | "The Scofflaw" | Andy Ackerman | Peter Mehlman | January 26, 1995 | 613 | 33.4 |
| 100 | 14 | "The Highlights of 100" | Andy Ackerman | Peter Mehlman | February 2, 1995 | 623 | 34.0 |
| 101 | 15 | "The Highlights of 100" | Andy Ackerman | Peter Mehlman | February 2, 1995 | 624 | 34.0 |
| 102 | 16 | "The Beard" | Andy Ackerman | Carol Leifer | February 9, 1995 | 615 | 32.9 |
| 103 | 17 | "The Kiss Hello" | Andy Ackerman | Larry David & Jerry Seinfeld | February 16, 1995 | 614 | 33.4 |
| 104 | 18 | "The Doorman" | Andy Ackerman | Tom Gammill & Max Pross | February 23, 1995 | 616 | 33.4 |
| 105 | 19 | "The Jimmy" | Andy Ackerman | Gregg Kavet & Andy Robin | March 16, 1995 | 617 | 31.1 |
| 106 | 20 | "The Doodle" | Andy Ackerman | Alec Berg & Jeff Schaffer | April 6, 1995 | 618 | 30.7 |
| 107 | 21 | "The Fusilli Jerry" | Andy Ackerman | Story by : Marjorie Gross & Jonathan Gross and Ron Hauge & Charlie Rubin; Teleplay by : Marjorie Gross | April 27, 1995 | 619 | 28.2 |
| 108 | 22 | "The Diplomat's Club" | Andy Ackerman | Tom Gammill & Max Pross | May 4, 1995 | 620 | 28.9 |
| 109 | 23 | "The Face Painter" | Andy Ackerman | Story by : Larry David and Fred Stoller; Teleplay by : Larry David | May 11, 1995 | 622 | 26.5 |
| 110 | 24 | "The Understudy" | Andy Ackerman | Marjorie Gross & Carol Leifer | May 18, 1995 | 621 | 29.8 |

=== Season 7 (1995–96) ===
| No. overall | No. in season | Title | Directed by | Written by | Original release date | Prod. code | US viewers (millions) |
|---|---|---|---|---|---|---|---|
| 111 | 1 | "The Engagement" | Andy Ackerman | Larry David | September 21, 1995 | 701 | 37.6 |
| 112 | 2 | "The Postponement" | Andy Ackerman | Larry David | September 28, 1995 | 702 | 34.5 |
| 113 | 3 | "The Maestro" | Andy Ackerman | Larry David | October 5, 1995 | 703 | 34.6 |
| 114 | 4 | "The Wink" | Andy Ackerman | Tom Gammill & Max Pross | October 12, 1995 | 704 | 32.3 |
| 115 | 5 | "The Hot Tub" | Andy Ackerman | Gregg Kavet & Andy Robin | October 19, 1995 | 705 | 32.6 |
| 116 | 6 | "The Soup Nazi" | Andy Ackerman | Spike Feresten | November 2, 1995 | 706 | 33.1 |
| 117 | 7 | "The Secret Code" | Andy Ackerman | Alec Berg & Jeff Schaffer | November 9, 1995 | 707 | 33.9 |
| 118 | 8 | "The Pool Guy" | Andy Ackerman | David Mandel | November 16, 1995 | 708 | 33.4 |
| 119 | 9 | "The Sponge" | Andy Ackerman | Peter Mehlman | December 7, 1995 | 709 | 32.3 |
| 120 | 10 | "The Gum" | Andy Ackerman | Tom Gammill & Max Pross | December 14, 1995 | 710 | 31.4 |
| 121 | 11 | "The Rye" | Andy Ackerman | Carol Leifer | January 4, 1996 | 711 | 35.1 |
| 122 | 12 | "The Caddy" | Andy Ackerman | Gregg Kavet & Andy Robin | January 25, 1996 | 712 | 32.0 |
| 123 | 13 | "The Seven" | Andy Ackerman | Alec Berg & Jeff Schaffer | February 1, 1996 | 713 | 37.1 |
| 124 | 14 | "The Cadillac" | Andy Ackerman | Larry David & Jerry Seinfeld | February 8, 1996 | 714 | 35.9 |
| 125 | 15 | "The Cadillac" | Andy Ackerman | Larry David & Jerry Seinfeld | February 8, 1996 | 717 | 35.9 |
| 126 | 16 | "The Shower Head" | Andy Ackerman | Peter Mehlman & Marjorie Gross | February 15, 1996 | 715 | 32.3 |
| 127 | 17 | "The Doll" | Andy Ackerman | Tom Gammill & Max Pross | February 22, 1996 | 716 | 32.9 |
| 128 | 18 | "The Friars Club" | Andy Ackerman | David Mandel | March 7, 1996 | 718 | 32.7 |
| 129 | 19 | "The Wig Master" | Andy Ackerman | Spike Feresten | April 4, 1996 | 719 | 30.5 |
| 130 | 20 | "The Calzone" | Andy Ackerman | Alec Berg & Jeff Schaffer | April 25, 1996 | 720 | 28.5 |
| 131 | 21 | "The Bottle Deposit" | Andy Ackerman | Gregg Kavet & Andy Robin | May 2, 1996 | 721 | 32.4 |
| 132 | 22 | "The Bottle Deposit" | Andy Ackerman | Gregg Kavet & Andy Robin | May 2, 1996 | 722 | 32.4 |
| 133 | 23 | "The Wait Out" | Andy Ackerman | Story by : Peter Mehlman & Matt Selman; Teleplay by : Peter Mehlman | May 9, 1996 | 723 | 29.9 |
| 134 | 24 | "The Invitations" | Andy Ackerman | Larry David | May 16, 1996 | 724 | 33.2 |

=== Season 8 (1996–97) ===
| No. overall | No. in season | Title | Directed by | Written by | Original release date | Prod. code | US viewers (millions) |
|---|---|---|---|---|---|---|---|
| 135 | 1 | "The Foundation" | Andy Ackerman | Alec Berg & Jeff Schaffer | September 19, 1996 | 801 | 33.72 |
| 136 | 2 | "The Soul Mate" | Andy Ackerman | Peter Mehlman | September 26, 1996 | 802 | 33.24 |
| 137 | 3 | "The Bizarro Jerry" | Andy Ackerman | David Mandel | October 3, 1996 | 803 | 31.62 |
| 138 | 4 | "The Little Kicks" | Andy Ackerman | Spike Feresten | October 10, 1996 | 804 | 32.24 |
| 139 | 5 | "The Package" | Andy Ackerman | Jennifer Crittenden | October 17, 1996 | 805 | 30.13 |
| 140 | 6 | "The Fatigues" | Andy Ackerman | Gregg Kavet & Andy Robin | October 31, 1996 | 806 | 30.33 |
| 141 | 7 | "The Checks" | Andy Ackerman | Steve O'Donnell and Tom Gammill & Max Pross | November 7, 1996 | 807 | 32.01 |
| 142 | 8 | "The Chicken Roaster" | Andy Ackerman | Alec Berg & Jeff Schaffer | November 14, 1996 | 808 | 34.09 |
| 143 | 9 | "The Abstinence" | Andy Ackerman | Steve Koren | November 21, 1996 | 809 | 34.35 |
| 144 | 10 | "The Andrea Doria" | Andy Ackerman | Spike Feresten | December 19, 1996 | 810 | 29.65 |
| 145 | 11 | "The Little Jerry" | Andy Ackerman | Jennifer Crittenden | January 9, 1997 | 811 | 34.48 |
| 146 | 12 | "The Money" | Andy Ackerman | Peter Mehlman | January 16, 1997 | 813 | 37.34 |
| 147 | 13 | "The Comeback" | David Owen Trainor | Gregg Kavet & Andy Robin | January 30, 1997 | 812 | 33.50 |
| 148 | 14 | "The Van Buren Boys" | Andy Ackerman | Darin Henry | February 6, 1997 | 814 | 33.82 |
| 149 | 15 | "The Susie" | Andy Ackerman | David Mandel | February 13, 1997 | 815 | 32.00 |
| 150 | 16 | "The Pothole" | Andy Ackerman | Steve O'Donnell and Dan O'Keefe | February 20, 1997 | 816 | 33.83 |
| 151 | 17 | "The English Patient" | Andy Ackerman | Steve Koren | March 13, 1997 | 817 | 31.27 |
| 152 | 18 | "The Nap" | Andy Ackerman | Gregg Kavet & Andy Robin | April 10, 1997 | 818 | 32.22 |
| 153 | 19 | "The Yada Yada" | Andy Ackerman | Peter Mehlman and Jill Franklyn | April 24, 1997 | 819 | 31.64 |
| 154 | 20 | "The Millennium" | Andy Ackerman | Jennifer Crittenden | May 1, 1997 | 820 | 29.30 |
| 155 | 21 | "The Muffin Tops" | Andy Ackerman | Spike Feresten | May 8, 1997 | 821 | 31.09 |
| 156 | 22 | "The Summer of George" | Andy Ackerman | Alec Berg & Jeff Schaffer | May 15, 1997 | 822 | 29.80 |

=== Season 9 (1997–98) ===
| No. overall | No. in season | Title | Directed by | Written by | Original release date | Prod. code | US viewers (millions) |
|---|---|---|---|---|---|---|---|
| 157 | 1 | "The Butter Shave" | Andy Ackerman | Alec Berg & Jeff Schaffer & David Mandel | September 25, 1997 | 901 | 37.78 |
| 158 | 2 | "The Voice" | Andy Ackerman | Alec Berg & Jeff Schaffer & David Mandel | October 2, 1997 | 902 | 30.93 |
| 159 | 3 | "The Serenity Now" | Andy Ackerman | Steve Koren | October 9, 1997 | 903 | 30.15 |
| 160 | 4 | "The Blood" | Andy Ackerman | Dan O'Keefe | October 16, 1997 | 904 | 31.45 |
| 161 | 5 | "The Junk Mail" | Andy Ackerman | Spike Feresten | October 30, 1997 | 905 | 30.24 |
| 162 | 6 | "The Merv Griffin Show" | Andy Ackerman | Bruce Eric Kaplan | November 6, 1997 | 906 | 31.64 |
| 163 | 7 | "The Slicer" | Andy Ackerman | Story by : Gregg Kavet & Andy Robin & Darin Henry; Teleplay by : Gregg Kavet & Andy Robin | November 13, 1997 | 907 | 32.77 |
| 164 | 8 | "The Betrayal" | Andy Ackerman | David Mandel & Peter Mehlman | November 20, 1997 | 908 | 33.99 |
| 165 | 9 | "The Apology" | Andy Ackerman | Jennifer Crittenden | December 11, 1997 | 909 | 30.47 |
| 166 | 10 | "The Strike" | Andy Ackerman | Dan O'Keefe and Alec Berg & Jeff Schaffer | December 18, 1997 | 910 | 30.79 |
| 167 | 11 | "The Dealership" | Andy Ackerman | Steve Koren | January 8, 1998 | 911 | 32.86 |
| 168 | 12 | "The Reverse Peephole" | Andy Ackerman | Spike Feresten | January 15, 1998 | 912 | 33.48 |
| 169 | 13 | "The Cartoon" | Andy Ackerman | Bruce Eric Kaplan | January 29, 1998 | 913 | 33.19 |
| 170 | 14 | "The Strongbox" | Andy Ackerman | Story by : Dan O'Keefe & Billy Kimball; Teleplay by : Dan O'Keefe | February 5, 1998 | 914 | 31.63 |
| 171 | 15 | "The Wizard" | Andy Ackerman | Steve Lookner | February 26, 1998 | 915 | 30.51 |
| 172 | 16 | "The Burning" | Andy Ackerman | Jennifer Crittenden | March 19, 1998 | 916 | 30.92 |
| 173 | 17 | "The Bookstore" | Andy Ackerman | Story by : Spike Feresten and Darin Henry & Marc Jaffe; Teleplay by : Spike Feresten | April 9, 1998 | 917 | 29.60 |
| 174 | 18 | "The Frogger" | Andy Ackerman | Story by : Gregg Kavet & Andy Robin and Steve Koren & Dan O'Keefe; Teleplay by : Gregg Kavet & Andy Robin | April 23, 1998 | 918 | 30.66 |
| 175 | 19 | "The Maid" | Andy Ackerman | Story by : Alec Berg & David Mandel & Jeff Schaffer and Kit Boss & Peter Mehlman; Teleplay by : Alec Berg & David Mandel & Jeff Schaffer | April 30, 1998 | 919 | 33.32 |
| 176 | 20 | "The Puerto Rican Day" | Andy Ackerman | Alec Berg, Jennifer Crittenden, Spike Feresten, Bruce Eric Kaplan, Gregg Kavet, Steve Koren, David Mandel, Dan O'Keefe, Andy Robin, Jeff Schaffer | May 7, 1998 | 920 | 38.78 |
| 177 | 21 | "The Clip Show" "The Chronicle" | Andy Ackerman | Darin Henry | May 14, 1998 | 921 | 58.53 |
| 178 | 22 | "The Clip Show" "The Chronicle" | Andy Ackerman | Darin Henry | May 14, 1998 | 922 | 58.53 |
| 179 | 23 | "The Finale" | Andy Ackerman | Larry David | May 14, 1998 | 923 | 76.26 |
| 180 | 24 | "The Finale" | Andy Ackerman | Larry David | May 14, 1998 | 924 | 76.26 |

== Ratings ==
Seinfeld : U.S. viewers per episode (millions)

| Season | Episode number | | | | | | | | | | | | | | | | | | | | | | | |
| Season | 1 | 2 | 3 | 4 | 5 | 6 | 7 | 8 | 9 | 10 | 11 | 12 | 13 | 14 | 15 | 16 | 17 | 18 | 19 | 20 | 21 | 22 | 23 | 24 |
|---|---|---|---|---|---|---|---|---|---|---|---|---|---|---|---|---|---|---|---|---|---|---|---|---|
| 1 | 15.4 | 22.5 | 19.7 | 19.1 | 19.4 | – | | | | | | | | | | | | | | | | | | |
| 2 | 15.6 | 15.2 | 14.8 | 13.6 | 24.7 | 23.3 | 19.6 | 20.6 | 22.9 | 17.2 | 16.8 | 12.5 | – | | | | | | | | | | | |
| 3 | 21.7 | 16.7 | 15.1 | 17.2 | 16.4 | 17.0 | 16.4 | 15.8 | 16.3 | 18.6 | 18.0 | 17.9 | 18.7 | 19.2 | 16.9 | 18.5 | 17.0 | 17.0 | 19.5 | 16.1 | 22.3 | 17.8 | 16.4 | – |
| 4 | 16.3 | 15.1 | 17.6 | 17.6 | 17.6 | 15.2 | 17.1 | 15.1 | 16.7 | 16.2 | 18.5 | 14.5 | 16.2 | 17.6 | TBD | 26.9 | 28.0 | 22.7 | 27.4 | 26.4 | 25.0 | 27.6 | 32.8 | 32.8 |
| 5 | 28.2 | 29.5 | 28.7 | 28.4 | 28.7 | 31.0 | 31.1 | 29.7 | 27.7 | 29.6 | 28.3 | 35.0 | 33.0 | 35.0 | 25.4 | 25.4 | 30.7 | 29.6 | 29.6 | 27.6 | 24.5 | 30.1 | – | |
| 6 | 32.8 | 32.4 | 29.8 | 29.2 | 28.0 | 30.6 | 29.6 | 32.4 | 29.7 | 26.8 | 36.6 | 36.2 | 33.4 | 34.0 | 34.0 | 32.9 | 33.4 | 33.4 | 31.1 | 30.7 | 28.2 | 28.9 | 26.5 | 29.8 |
| 7 | 37.6 | 34.5 | 34.6 | 32.3 | 32.6 | 33.1 | 33.9 | 33.4 | 32.3 | 31.4 | 35.1 | 32.0 | 37.1 | 35.9 | 35.9 | 32.3 | 32.9 | 32.7 | 30.5 | 28.5 | 32.4 | 32.4 | 29.9 | 33.2 |
| 8 | 33.72 | 33.24 | 31.62 | 32.24 | 30.13 | 30.33 | 32.01 | 34.09 | 34.35 | 29.65 | 34.48 | 37.34 | 33.50 | 33.82 | 32.00 | 33.83 | 31.27 | 32.22 | 31.64 | 29.30 | 31.09 | 29.80 | – | |
| 9 | 37.78 | 30.93 | 30.15 | 31.45 | 30.24 | 31.64 | 32.77 | 33.99 | 30.47 | 30.79 | 32.86 | 33.48 | 33.19 | 31.63 | 30.51 | 30.92 | 29.60 | 30.66 | 33.32 | 38.78 | 58.53 | 58.53 | 76.26 | 76.26 |

Audience measurement performed by Nielsen Media Research

== Notes ==
Specific sources and notes
