= The Calzone =

- Seinfeld episode
- Episode no.: Season 7 Episode 20
- Directed by: Andy Ackerman
- Written by: Alec Berg & Jeff Schaffer
- Production code: 720
- Original air date: April 25, 1996

Guest appearances
- Wayne Knight as Newman; John D'Aquino as Todd Gack; Peter Allas as Mario the Counter Guy; Dylan Tays as Nicki; Greg Collins as Policeman; Jane A. Johnston as Todd's Mother; Lee Bear as George Steinbrenner (uncredited); Larry David as George Steinbrenner (voice) (uncredited)

Episode chronology
← Previous "The Wig Master"	Next → "The Bottle Deposit"
- Seinfeld season 7

"The Calzone" is the 130th episode of the NBC sitcom Seinfeld. This is the 20th episode of the seventh season, originally airing on April 25, 1996. In this episode, Steinbrenner's craving for calzones goes from a blessing to a curse for George; a man goes out with Elaine without asking for a date; Kramer will only wear freshly hot clothes; and Jerry dates a beauty who always gets her way.

== Plot ==
During a Yankees meeting, Steinbrenner demands a taste of George's calzone; becoming hooked, he throws everyone else out to eat with George. Gaining exclusive access to Steinbrenner over daily calzone lunches, George gets his say in every executive decision. Kramer decides to only wear clothes hot from the dryer every day, but must sift through mounds of loose change for quarters.

Elaine wins dinner from Todd Gack because he lost a bet with her that Dustin Hoffman was in Star Wars. They go to a movie after, and run into Jerry and his gorgeous girlfriend Nicki. Todd hooks up Jerry with cigars he can get for "dirt cheap". They have all missed tickets to a sold-out movie, but Jerry sends Nicki to easily sweet-talk tickets from management—without thinking to get any for Elaine and Todd. Todd plans to deliver the cigars to Elaine, and Jerry realizes that Todd is finding loopholes to date her without asking her out.

George's tips for his calzones at Paisano's go unappreciated because the server is always looking the wrong way. George tries to take a tip back to try again, but the server sees his hand in the tip jar and bans him in a rage. With Steinbrenner set on eating the same lunch for years on end, George cannot get off the hook to bring him calzones without risking his wrath, or letting a coworker usurp this privilege. Luckily, Newman can pick up Paisano's every day on his mail route, but, contemptuous of George keeping company with Jerry, Newman demands to be kept well-fed at George's expense.

Confident in Nicki's sweet-talking, Jerry drives egregiously over the speed limit and lets her get him off scot-free. Running out of quarters, Kramer heats his clothes in Jerry's oven, while Jerry finds that he is overpaying Todd for Peruvian, not Cuban, cigars. Todd indignantly denies that he is dating Elaine, then takes her on another non-date, where he introduces her to his parents and tries to kiss her good night.

To renege on his payment, Jerry sends Nicki to sweet-talk Todd. Instead, Todd gets together with Nicki by betting her dinner and losing, exposing his modus operandi to Elaine. One rainy day, Newman reveals that he never works in the rain, leaving George high and dry while still taking his money. George sends Kramer to Paisano's, where he is inspired to dry his sopping wet clothes in the spacious pizza oven; however, the server refuses Kramer paying with a pantsful of pennies. Empty-handed, Kramer tosses his "overcooked" clothes, charred and calzone-scented, in George's office.

Nicki dumps Jerry, but still sweet-talks him into walking her dog. Jerry sends Kramer to pay Todd with $300 in pennies, knocking Todd over. Steinbrenner, hungrily waiting for George, smells calzones through the ventilation and ransacks George's office searching for them. George explains Kramer's clothes, and Steinbrenner forgets about the calzones as he plans a pennant run by cooking Yankees uniforms in pizza ovens.

== Production ==
Writers Alec Berg and Jeff Schaffer got the inspiration for the episode when they took a break from writing for calzones and their contribution to the tip jar went unnoticed. Kramer's Italian rant was unscripted, and was improvised by actor Michael Richards during filming.

In an unused ending to the George story, Steinbrenner decides he no longer wants calzones because the cheese is bad for his health, and says he'll have "a big salad" instead, referencing the episode "The Big Salad".
