= The Bottle Deposit =

- Seinfeld episodes
- Episode nos.: Season 7 Episodes 21/22
- Directed by: Andy Ackerman
- Written by: Gregg Kavet & Andy Robin
- Production code: 721/722
- Original air date: May 2, 1996
- Running time: 42 minutes

Guest appearances
- Wayne Knight as Newman; Richard Herd as Wilhelm; John O'Hurley as Peterman; Brenda Strong as Sue Ellen; Brad Garrett as Tony Abado; Patrick Kerr as La Forge - Clerk; Mary Jo Keenen as Deena Lazzari; Rance Howard as Farmer; Karen Lynn Scott as Susie; Nicholas Mele as Detective; Sandy Ward as Pop; Harvey Jason as Auctioneer; Larry Polson as Homeless Guy; Dan O'Connor as Young Cop; Bonnie McNeil as Woman; Lee Bear as George Steinbrenner (uncredited); Larry David as George Steinbrenner (voice) (uncredited)

Episode chronology
← Previous "The Calzone"	Next → "The Wait Out"
- Seinfeld season 7

"The Bottle Deposit" is a two-part episode, the 131st and 132nd episodes, and 21st and 22nd episodes of the seventh season, of the NBC sitcom Seinfeld, first aired on May 2, 1996. It was originally an hour-long episode, but was split into two parts for syndication.

The episode was written by Gregg Kavet and Andy Robin, and directed by Andy Ackerman. In this episode, George must complete a work project without knowing what it is; Elaine overbids on Peterman's behalf for JFK's golf clubs; Jerry loses his car, with the golf clubs inside, to an overprotective mechanic; and Newman and Kramer haul bottles and cans to redeem for a profit in Michigan.

== Plot ==
=== Part 1 ===
George hesitates to follow Mr. Wilhelm into the men's room while receiving an important project, and misses hearing Wilhelm dictating instructions to him on the toilet. Having been making Wilhelm repeat himself and testing his patience, George dares not provoke him further, despite having no idea what the project is. Peterman, eyeing John F. Kennedy's "presidential golf clubs" up for auction at Sotheby's, sends Elaine with $10,000 to bid in his absence. Returning from a grocery trip with Newman in Jerry's car, Kramer makes Newman save soda bottles for 5-cent deposit refunds.

At the auction, Elaine shows off to the disdainful Sue Ellen Mischke that she can afford to bid, but this baits Sue Ellen into bidding against her. Elaine gets goaded into blowing twice Peterman's budget on the clubs, which she leaves in Jerry's car. Jerry finds his engine overheated by excess groceries stashed under the hood, and must visit his mechanic, Tony. Deeply protective of Jerry's car, Tony is far more concerned with Jerry's hands-off car care than his engine troubles.

By playing along with Wilhelm, George learns he needs to visit the payroll office, staffed by a mistrustful clerk. George gets the clerk to hear his assignment straight from Wilhelm himself, but, duly chastened, the clerk will not repeat it back to George. Wilhelm then cryptically sends George "downtown", "just like the song says", leaving George searching the lyrics of Petula Clark's "Downtown" for clues in vain.

Newman smells opportunity from hauling bottles and cans to Michigan for their higher refund of 10 cents, but Kramer dashes his hopes, having already calculated that trucking across states would eat up profits. Not giving up, Newman remembers that the upcoming Mother's Day mail surge will dispatch extra postal trucks bound for Saginaw, Michigan. Commandeering a lightly laden truck at no cost to themselves, Newman and Kramer gleefully fill it with cans and bottles scavenged by hook or by crook.

Tony holds Jerry accountable for cutting corners maintaining his car, and demands his faithful commitment to his car's welfare at any cost. Impatient, Jerry asks for the car back. Just as Elaine arrives to retrieve the clubs, Tony absconds with the car to safeguard it from Jerry.

=== Part 2 ===
Jerry's predicament turns out to be a textbook car abduction by an emotionally over-invested mechanic. Warned that these cases end tragically, Jerry gets summoned to identify the grisly disemboweled remains of a car, which horrify and nauseate all present. However, Jerry's car is still with Tony, who calls from the countryside, declaring himself the rightful owner.

Just as George gives up, Wilhelm inexplicably congratulates him for a job well done. Unbeknownst to George, Wilhelm has been missing his psychiatric medication, and attributing his own work to others in confusion. George decides not to dwell on this mystery, as Wilhelm turns in a report in George's name.

Kramer and Newman, each set to earn $500, merrily drive to Michigan. In Ohio, Kramer spots Jerry's car and reports to Jerry on mobile phone, but dares not call the police while hijacking a mail truck. Knowing that a detour will wipe out their profits, Kramer makes the tough call to pursue the car, to Newman's consternation. Unable to catch up, Kramer dumps all the cargo before realizing Newman is the dead weight slowing them down. Newman gets thrown out in the middle of nowhere, and can only seek refuge at a farmer's house.

Reading the deeply concerning report, Steinbrenner calls a mental institution to take George away, rooting for his quick recovery as he haplessly protests that the report somehow wrote itself. Deena Lazzari finds George psychiatrically committed alongside Pop, confirming her belief that George was crazy all along.

With Kramer at his heels, Tony pelts the truck with golf clubs, popping a tire. Stopped dead, Kramer duly picks up the clubs for Elaine. Meanwhile, Newman falls for the farmer's flirtatious daughter over dinner, defying the farmer's stern warning. Kramer stumbles upon the farmhouse just as the shotgun-toting farmer chases Newman off.

Receiving the golf clubs, Peterman assumes they came pre-mangled, and sees JFK in a new light as a raging golfer.

== Production ==
Like most two-part Seinfeld episodes, "The Bottle Deposit" was originally conceived as a normal half-hour time slot episode, but became too long for one episode and too short for two; the production team made the call to add more scenes rather than cut down. Scenes added in the second round of filming include the "Downtown" thread, Jerry's talk with the detective, the identification of the wrecked car, Kramer and Newman singing a parody of "99 Bottles of Beer", Newman's dinner with the farmer and his daughter, and the scene in the insane asylum.

The farmer's daughter's cry of "Goodbye, Norman! Goodbye!" at the end of the episode was an unscripted mistake by actress Karen Lynn Scott, kept by the production team as an unintentional joke. During filming of the scene, the running made actor Wayne Knight, then at his peak weight, experience palpitations. He credits this incident with motivating him to see a doctor and return to a healthy weight.

== See also ==
- Container deposit legislation
