= The Andrea Doria (Seinfeld) =

- Seinfeld episode
- Episode no.: Season 8 Episode 10
- Directed by: Andy Ackerman
- Written by: Spike Feresten
- Production code: 810
- Original air date: December 19, 1996

Guest appearances
- Wayne Knight as Newman; Jerry Stiller as Frank Costanza; Estelle Harris as Estelle Costanza; Tom Gallop as Alan; Ray Stricklyn as Clarence; Diana Bellamy as Mrs. Ricardi; Rick Hall as Vet; Carl Banks as Policeman #1; Barry Cutler as Policeman #2; Kevin Steinberg as Waiter; Ossie Mair as Driver; Fred Pinkard as Old Man; Rene Ashton as Ex-Girlfriend; Brian Blondell as Dog Guy; Theresa Mulligan as Woman; Florinel Fatulescu as Stand Owner

Episode chronology
← Previous "The Abstinence"	Next → "The Little Jerry"

"The Andrea Doria" is the 144th episode of American television sitcom Seinfeld. This was the tenth episode for the eighth season, originally airing on NBC on December 19, 1996. In this episode, Jerry helps Newman with getting a transfer by filling in for him on his mail route, Kramer's preference for veterinarians over doctors leads to him exhibiting dog-like behavior, Elaine dates a "bad breaker-upper", and George tries to win the pity of a tenant association so he can get a new apartment.

== Plot ==
Jerry rents out half his mini-storage unit to Kramer, who rents a quarter to Newman, who uses it for bags of mail. Newman explains that he is disgruntled because he didn't get a transfer to Hawaii, and so is hiding his assigned mail. However, the mailman who got the transfer is fired for hoarding Victoria's Secret catalogues, giving Newman another shot.

Kramer refuses to go to a doctor for a bad cough, despite Jerry’s suggestion. He finds a dog named Smuckers who also has a cough, and takes him to a veterinarian, behind Jerry's back, since he trusts vets more than doctors. However, his throat is too tender to swallow the medication, and he begins acting like a dog.

Jerry tries to force Kramer to go see a human-focused doctor, defying Kramer’s protests, but, when Jerry pulls him out of his car, Kramer runs away and gets in an argument with Newman about his moving away. He bites Newman's ankle, leaving him unable to deliver mail. Jerry delivers the rest of Newman's mail, hoping to help him get his transfer to Hawaii and move out of his life. But the post office finds out that Newman wasn't doing his route himself (too many people actually got their mail), so they don't give him the transfer. Upset at Jerry’s blunder, Newman removes his hat and the patch from his coat, only to regret it afterward when Jerry points out that the coat belongs to Newman.

Elaine's blind date Alan fails to show because he was stabbed by an ex-girlfriend. At first Elaine is enticed by the idea that he arouses such passion, but when another ex-girlfriend throws coffee in his face on their first date, Elaine checks his background and discovers Alan is a "bad breaker-upper." Deeming this an unacceptable flaw, Elaine breaks up with Alan. He retaliates by calling her "big head." The comment about her head holds true when a cab-driver asks her to move her head and a bird crashes into her head. She decides to see Alan again to prove to herself she doesn't care about his comment. On their date, Alan tells her she has a bump on her nose, and she attacks him with a fork, which Kramer, despite his sore throat, manages to bring to the attention of the authorities.

George can't get a new apartment because the tenant association is giving it to an Andrea Doria survivor, Clarence. George is sympathetic at first, but after Kramer (who owns a book on real-life sea voyages) informs him of the details of the Andrea Doria (the ship took 10 hours to sink, and only 46 out of 1,706 people died), he feels Clarence's case is weak. At Jerry's suggestion, George requests a hearing with the association and tells them various misfortunes of his life, leaving the committee in tears, but Alan gets the apartment instead by bribing the building's super. When George confronts him over this, Alan calls him "chinless". George rubs his chin and looks perturbed.

== Production ==
The table read for "The Andrea Doria" was held on November 14, 1996. The cold open was filmed on November 18, and took six takes due to various technical problems. Most of the episode was filmed in front of a live studio audience on November 20. In order to make "The Andrea Doria" Seinfeld's annual Christmas episode for season 8, Christmas decorations were put up in Monk's Cafe.

Sequences which were filmed but deleted before broadcast due to length restrictions include Jerry noticing the dummy Mr. Marbles among Kramer's items going into storage, Kramer sticking his head out of the window of Jerry's car to clear his sinuses, Jerry offering to carry Newman on his back so Newman can complete his mail route, Jerry sabotaging a FedEx truck by releasing its emergency brake as part of his mail route, and George telling the tenant committee about his short lived hand modeling career in "The Puffy Shirt". In addition, an alternate ending to Jerry's attempt to take Kramer to the doctor was filmed, in which Kramer simply refuses to leave the car.

Elaine's descriptor "stab-worthy" is a callback to "The Sponge", while the scene where Kramer leads police to the restaurant is an homage to the TV series Lassie.
