= The Little Jerry =

- Seinfeld episode
- Episode no.: Season 8 Episode 11
- Directed by: Andy Ackerman
- Written by: Jennifer Crittenden
- Production code: 811
- Original air date: January 9, 1997

Guest appearances
- Barney Martin as Morty Seinfeld; Liz Sheridan as Helen Seinfeld; John Michael Higgins as Kurt; Miguel Sandoval as Marcelino; Andrea Bendewald as Celia; Kathryn Joosten as Betsy; Paul Perri as Detective Danner; Al White as Detective Udewitz; Ray Proscia as Bobby - Guard

Episode chronology
← Previous "The Andrea Doria"	Next → "The Money"
- Seinfeld season 8

"The Little Jerry" is the 145th episode of the sitcom Seinfeld. It is the 11th episode of the eighth season, originally airing on January 9, 1997. In this episode, Kramer buys a rooster and enters him into cock fights, George dates a prison inmate, and Elaine's boyfriend Kurt discovers he is going bald after he stops shaving his head.

== Plot ==
Bodega owner Marcelino posts one of Jerry's bounced checks on his cash register, along with other bad ones. Jerry pays what was owed, but Marcelino refuses to take the check down, citing his store policy.

Elaine notices her boyfriend Kurt has an attractive head of hair in his driver's license photo; he only shaves his head because he likes how it looks. She persuades him to regrow his hair, but when his first sprouts appear they discover he is going bald. George determines Kurt has 10–14 months before he goes completely bald, and advises him to live life as fully as possible in that time. In observance of this advice, Kurt proposes to Elaine, who accepts.

The Susan Ross Foundation makes a large donation to a women's prison, and George goes there to inspect it. While there he asks out an inmate, Celia, pleased to have found a girlfriend who cannot "pop in" unexpectedly at his place.

Kramer buys what he thinks is a hen for its eggs and names it "Little Jerry Seinfeld", but Jerry tells him it is a rooster. After witnessing the rooster beat a small dog into submission, Marcelino convinces Kramer to enter Little Jerry in a cock fight, which he wins. Marcelino then offers a deal: he will take Jerry's check down if he can have Little Jerry. Kramer refuses the transaction, and Marcelino instead tries to bribe them to have Little Jerry throw his next fight. Insulted, Jerry and Kramer extensively train Little Jerry. At the cock fight, Little Jerry is faced with a huge and skilled opponent. Kramer dives after Little Jerry to protect him, and is violently attacked by the opposing bird.

Celia comes up for parole, so George insinuates to the warden that Celia intends to take part in a heist upon her release. When Celia is denied parole, she breaks out and "pops in" at George's place. She is tracked down and arrested. The officers mistake Kurt for George due to his hair loss, goading Kurt to engage one of them in a fist fight, and Kurt is sentenced to 10–14 months. Elaine realizes that by that time, he will be as bald as George, so she breaks off their engagement.

== Production ==
The table reading for this episode took place on Sunday, November 24, 1996, and the majority was filmed in front of a live studio audience on Wednesday, November 27, 1996 (the day before Thanksgiving). The episode premiered on Thursday, January 9, 1997, being the first Seinfeld episode to air in the new year.

John Michael Higgins, who played Kurt, shaved his head for the part. Sequences which were filmed but deleted before broadcast include an entire scene of Jerry and Elaine discussing Kurt and the opening of the scene in which Jerry and Kramer argue over selling Little Jerry (in which Jerry sees Kramer on the roof, yells at him to come down, and Kramer accordingly enters Jerry's apartment via the fire escape).

== Reception ==
This episode gained a 23.0 Nielsen Rating and a 33 audience share, meaning that 23% of American households watched the episode, and 33% of all televisions in use at the time were tuned into it.

After New York Mets reliever Frank Francisco made comments about the New York Yankees being "chickens", his teammate Tim Byrdak proceeded to buy an actual chicken and act like the Yankees sent it to the Mets clubhouse. The chicken was welcomed into the Mets clubhouse, and Byrdak named it "Little Jerry Seinfeld", inspired by this episode. The chicken was subsequently placed into an animal sanctuary.
