= The Engagement (Seinfeld) =

- Seinfeld episode
- Episode no.: Season 7 Episode 1
- Directed by: Andy Ackerman
- Written by: Larry David
- Production code: 701
- Original air date: September 21, 1995

Guest appearances
- Wayne Knight as Newman; Jerry Stiller as Frank Costanza; Estelle Harris as Estelle Costanza; Heidi Swedberg as Susan Ross; Mario Joyner as himself; Cindy Cheung as Woman #1 (credit only); Janni Brenn as Woman #2; Mailon Rivera as Cop #1; Ed O'Ross as Cop #2; Athena Massey as Melanie; Ron Byron as Man; Renee Faia as Alice

Episode chronology
← Previous "The Understudy"	Next → "The Postponement"
- Seinfeld season 7

"The Engagement" is the first episode of the seventh-season and the 111th overall episode of the NBC sitcom Seinfeld. The episode marked a major change in the series' status quo by having regular cast member George Costanza become engaged to Susan Ross. Susan was a recurring character during season 4 of the series but had not been seen since. The episode aired on September 21, 1995.

== Plot ==
George dumps his girlfriend for beating him at chess, while Jerry dumps his girlfriend for shushing him. They realize that they both need to grow up and take relationships seriously, and shake on it. However, Kramer warns Jerry that only the shackles of married life await them.

At Elaine's new apartment, a neighbor's dog barks incessantly every night. Sleepless and desperate, Elaine meets with Newman, who reviles dogs and ominously offers to do away with them. To put Elaine's conscience at ease, Kramer proposes kidnapping and rehoming the dog instead.

George is nostalgic about his times with Susan Ross, who is still available. He hurries to propose to her, and wins her over by sheer persistence. Despite George's jubilation, his parents are suspicious of the news. Jerry dumps his girlfriend again for eating peas one at a time, letting down George's expectation of solidarity from him.

Elaine is surprised when Newman reveals her tormentor as a tiny Yorkshire Terrier. Driving upstate in a rented van, Kramer forcibly drops the dog off, but it finds its way home overnight, to Elaine's dismay. The police bust the three for dognapping, thanks to a tag ripped from Kramer's shirt and a van seat that collapsed under Newman's weight. Reflecting on her ignominy, Elaine realizes she needs to grow up.

George passes up seeing Firestorm because he cannot take Susan, missing out on a spectacular action blockbuster. Later, watching Mad About You with Susan instead of baseball, George silently laments.

== Production ==
Writer/co-creator Larry David came up with the idea of George becoming engaged with the intent that it be a season-long story arc, but at the time had no plan for how the arc would be resolved. He wrote the first three episodes of the series in order to set the tone for the season.

The expression "Happy, Pappy?" was used by actress Heidi Swedberg in off-camera conversations with David. All the clips in the flashback montage of George and Susan's relationship were filmed specifically for this episode.

Actress Julia Louis-Dreyfus lost her voice overnight from doing the scene where Elaine shouts at the dog, so the writers worked her hoarseness into the episode's script.

== Critical reception ==
David Sims of The A.V. Club wrote, "The two-part (sorta) season opener to Seinfeld really feels like Larry David throwing down a marker. You know how last year was just generally a lot of fun, and had a little more broad, goofy comedy? ... For his last season on the show (he would return for the finale and continue to voice Steinbrenner) David goes back to the model he employed in seasons prior of having a loose arc for the year, and this time it's George getting married. The news is abrupt, shocking, and hilariously welcome. ... George is such a wreck by the end of that spectacle, it's hard not to pity him, stupid and impulsive as he may be."

Joanna L. Di Mattia, author of the essay "The Show About Something: Anxious Manhood and the Homosocial Order on Seinfeld," argues that "Susan Ross ... ultimately embodies the restrictions of marriage for George, and therefore a real threat to the male friendships on the show." This episode "illustrates how to approach marriage with the most inappropriate partner, solely for the purpose of personal reinforcement."

Vanity Fair put "The Engagement" at #106 in a ranking of all 180 episodes.
