= The Old Man (Seinfeld) =

- Seinfeld episode
- Episode no.: Season 4 Episode 18
- Directed by: Tom Cherones
- Story by: Bruce Kirschbaum
- Teleplay by: Larry Charles
- Production code: 418
- Original air date: February 18, 1993

Guest appearances
- Wayne Knight as Newman; Bill Erwin as Sid; Tobin Bell as Ron; Robert Donley as Ben; Lanei Chapman as Housekeeper; Edie McClurg as Mrs. Oliver

Episode chronology
← Previous "The Outing"	Next → "The Implant"
- Seinfeld season 4

"The Old Man" is the 58th episode of the American television sitcom Seinfeld. It was the 18th episode of the 4th season. It aired on February 18, 1993 on NBC. In this episode, Jerry, Elaine, and George volunteer to visit the elderly, while Kramer and Newman haul off unwanted vinyl records to resell.

== Plot ==
At Monk's, George once again despairs at meeting women, and contemplates meeting a non-English speaker as a last resort. Jerry delights in schadenfreude listening to him. George feels an existential void in life, but Elaine, who has already heard this spiel from him, has volunteered at an agency to provide senior companionship, which has brought her satisfaction even before making any visits. George and Jerry join her.

Kramer and Newman start a side hustle to haul away obsolete vinyl records to resell. Newman reveals that he is a postal worker, and describing his job brings him to the verge of going postal, unnerving Jerry into relinquishing his own unwanted records. The proprietor of a used record shop offers $5 for Jerry's kitschy albums, and Kramer feeds Newman lines to express their displeasure.

Jerry visits Mr. Fields, an antagonistic old man who insults, defies, and trolls Jerry for his own amusement, and openly badmouths his live-in Senegalese caretaker, taking advantage of her very poor English. However, he has a record collection that he wants thrown out. George meets Mr. Cantwell at Monk's, but refuses to believe that Cantwell has made peace with his mortality. Having no time for this, Cantwell fires him. In a darkened apartment, Elaine meets Mrs. Oliver but must avert her eyes from an enormous goiter on her neck.

Jerry tips off Kramer and Newman about the unwanted records, and also tips George off about the attractive caretaker, so they all tag along on Jerry's next visit. George tells the caretaker his desire to rub oil on her with his head, to check that she cannot understand. Kramer and Newman's frenzied plundering alarms Fields, who tries to throw them out, and bites Kramer. Kramer flinches and sends Fields's false teeth flying, and George accidentally pulverizes them in the garbage disposal. They all pile into a taxi to take Fields to his dentist, but Fields slips away in the confusion.

Elaine is unexpectedly enthralled by Mrs. Oliver's reminiscing about her scandalous private affair with Mohandas Gandhi, in which he would rub oil on her with his head. After being offered merely $20 for the second lot of records, Kramer feeds Newman a string of fighting words, provoking the proprietor into a brawl that destroys the records.

Jerry makes excuses for singlehandedly ruining the agency's reputation, while Fields remains missing. The agency and next of kin join the search, leading everyone back to Fields's apartment, where they find instead the caretaker oiling up George in the dark with African music playing.

Fields and Cantwell meet at Monk's. Fields, despairing at meeting women, recounts being set up on a date with Mrs. Oliver—where he was turned off when she put milk in tea without asking.

== Production ==
As a tribute to Abbott and Costello, the antagonistic old man was named after cast member Sidney Fields.

This episode expanded Newman's role while continuing a trend of Kramer and Newman as a comedic duo. Michael Richards recalled that, at the time, he became wary that the pairing would make Kramer less distinct, but conceded that his concerns came out of egotism and were baseless.

Lanei Chapman plays the housekeeper. An alternate ending was filmed where her character, in perfect English, blames George for their compromising tryst. Disappointed by her fluency, George tries to break off the relationship with lengthy excuses as the entire search party looks on.
