= The Junk Mail =

- Seinfeld episode
- Episode no.: Season 9 Episode 5
- Directed by: Andy Ackerman
- Written by: Spike Feresten
- Production code: 905
- Original air date: October 30, 1997

Guest appearances
- Wayne Knight as Newman; Jerry Stiller as Frank Costanza; Estelle Harris as Estelle Costanza; Patrick Warburton as David Puddy; Laurie Taylor-Williams as Rhisa; Dana Gould as Frankie; Richard Kuhlman as Man; Wilford Brimley as Postmaster General Henry Atkins; Toby Huss as Jack; Montrose Hagins as Old Woman; Peggy Blow as Mail Clerk; Clement Blake as Dirt Person #1; D.A. Johnson as Dirt Person #2; Ruth Cohen as Ruthie Cohen (uncredited); Renee McClellan as Post Office Customer (uncredited)

Episode chronology
← Previous "The Blood"	Next → "The Merv Griffin Show"
- Seinfeld season 9

"The Junk Mail" is the 161st episode of the NBC sitcom Seinfeld. It was the fifth episode of the ninth and final season. The episode aired on October 30, 1997. In this episode, Jerry is gifted a van by a childhood friend and cannot turn it down for fear of hurting his feelings, Elaine mistakenly thinks she has fallen in love when the sight of a man triggers memories of an old commercial he appeared in, and Kramer, tired of getting swamped with junk mail, tries to stop all delivery of his mail, only to uncover a conspiracy by the United States Postal Service to keep the public from realizing that mail is pointless. Produced when e-mail was becoming a mainstream form of communication, the episode reflected the popular prediction of the time that postal service would soon become obsolete.

== Plot ==
Kramer gets an overabundance of Pottery Barn catalogs, which he saves up and angrily dumps at their local store. Increasingly frustrated at his volume of junk mail, Kramer bricks up his mailbox, but the postman just stuffs his mail into Jerry's mailbox. Kramer goes to the post office to stop his mail. Newman refuses and warns him that there is a conspiracy at work.

Jerry's childhood friend Frankie Merman gets Jerry a new van as a thank you for a show he did for Frankie's car dealership. Jerry does not want the van, but is afraid to refuse it, since Frankie is very emotionally fragile. Jerry takes out a classified ad to sell the van. Kramer offers Anthony Quinn's old T-shirt as a trade for the van. Jerry refuses, but Kramer nonetheless tells Frankie that Jerry sold him the van, uses it to launch an anti-postal campaign, and loans it to George's parents.

Kramer ignores Newman's warnings, and is abducted. Postmaster General Henry Atkins intimidates Kramer into receiving his mail again; as he leaves, Newman is led in with a bucket over his head and his hands zip tied together. He says to Kramer, "Tell the world my story.”

George's parents make up excuses to cut him short on his weekly phone call and leave the house when he visits. When George confronts them about this, they tell him they are cutting him loose. George sexually propositions his cousin Rhisa to force his parents to get involved in his life. However, Rhisa agrees to the relationship and insists on keeping it secret. When he hears that his parents are borrowing the van, George schemes to make out with Rhisa in it so his parents will catch them when they pick it up. Jerry searches Central Park for Frankie, who has gone to dig a hole and sit in it. George parks the van in front of Frankie's hole. Frankie yells "Is this Seinfeld's van?! Seinfeld's van!", which George mistakes as "Son of Sam", running away in fear. The Costanza parents find the van. Jerry reconciles with Frankie and helps him out of the hole. They and George and Rhisa see the van rocking; despite Jerry cautioning them against opening it, they do so and see the Costanzas having sex. Upon seeing this, Frankie and Jerry agree to sell the van, while George is traumatized. His parents give him a "the birds and the bees" talk, only traumatizing him further.

Elaine has a "love at first sight" encounter with fact-checker Jack, and breaks up with David Puddy so she can date him. While going through an old VHS tape, Jerry discovers a commercial that features Jack as "The Wiz", a mascot for the electronics store of the same name. He realizes that Elaine's "love at first sight" experience is actually her remembering this commercial. Once confronted with this, Elaine wants Puddy back, but he rejects her. She tries to settle for Jack, but to her dismay, he quits his fact-checking job so that he can appear in The Wiz commercials again.

== Production ==
Spike Feresten wrote "The Junk Mail" largely as an expression of his frustration at getting Pottery Barn catalogs in his mailbox on a near daily basis.

The Postmaster General in the episode, Henry Atkins, is a fictional character; the real Postmaster General at the time the episode was produced was Marvin T. Runyon.

The character David Puddy jokingly suggests that Elaine might fall in love with the Maytag Repairman; both of the actors who had played the Maytag Repairman up to this time, Jesse White and Gordon Jump, had appeared in earlier episodes of Seinfeld.

Newman's warning to Kramer on how the U.S. Postal Service will retaliate for Kramer's refusal to receive his mail is a parody of a scene from the film Three Days of the Condor, when Joubert muses on how Turner might be killed by the CIA.

Among the scenes which were filmed for the episode but cut before broadcast are an opening scene in which Elaine tries to refill her coffee at Monk's herself, and the ending scene, in which it is revealed that Jerry's van was purchased by Jack, who refurbishes it as a Nobody Beats the Wiz van and takes Elaine on a date in it, loudly introducing her to prospective customers as "Lady Wiz".

== Analysis ==
Writer Spike Feresten has not publicly commented on the scene where Henry Atkins intimidates Kramer, which has been subject to conflicting interpretations. Some have interpreted it as a parody of a scene in Absence of Malice which also featured actor Wilford Brimley (Atkins in "The Junk Mail"), while others argue that it is more closely derived from a scene in Network.
