= The Red Dot =

- Seinfeld episode
- Episode no.: Season 3 Episode 12
- Directed by: Tom Cherones
- Written by: Larry David
- Production code: 311
- Original air date: December 11, 1991

Guest appearances
- Rachel Davies as Saleswoman; Richard Fancy as Mr. Lippman; David Naughton as Dick; Bridget Sienna as Evie the Cleaning Lady

Episode chronology
← Previous "The Alternate Side"	Next → "The Subway"
- Seinfeld season 3

"The Red Dot" is the 29th episode of the sitcom Seinfeld. It is the twelfth episode of the show's third season. It first aired on NBC on December 11, 1991.

== Plot ==
At a Christmas party at Pendant Publishing, Jerry and George meet Elaine's coworker boyfriend Dick, who is a recovering alcoholic. Jerry mixes up whether Dick is "on" or "off the wagon". Elaine brings George to her boss to fill an opening for a publisher's reader. Despite knowing no literature, George fakes expertise by inventing a Beatnik poet called "Art Vandelay". Jerry fails to hold on to Elaine's vodka, causing Dick to confuse it for his juice; Elaine fears that Dick will relapse as a result.

George gets hired, and is obligated to thank Elaine with a Christmas gift. Finding a luxurious cashmere wool sweater on deep discount, he is shown that it bears a manufacturing defect—a small red dot—but decides to feign ignorance. Jerry makes Kramer drink strong Scotch to check whether Elaine should be able to smell drink on Dick's breath. Elaine is bowled over by the apparent generosity of George's gift, but the drunken Kramer immediately spots the red dot, bringing down her suspicion upon George and Jerry. Elaine sees through Jerry's evasiveness and tricks George into confessing to buying a defective gift. He pitifully begs her forgiveness with sob stories.

Working late, George is physically attracted to an office cleaner, and they have drunken sex on his desk. The cleaner, Evie, holds this over George as leverage. George tries to buy Evie's silence by re-gifting the sweater to her. Overjoyed, Evie nostalgically recalls, as a child in Panama, aggressively begging a man for his cashmere sweater. However, she too notices the red dot, and reports George.

Meanwhile, Dick has indeed relapsed to drink, losing his job and drunkenly heckling Jerry, who still stubbornly gets "on" and "off the wagon" backwards. Jerry goes to Pendant to console a fired George, and Elaine fails to trick Jerry into confessing to switching Dick's drink on purpose. Dick, on a drunken rampage, terrorizes and corners all three of them. George pacifies Dick by offering the sweater—until he also notices the red dot.

Later, a sober Dick watches Jerry's act with good humor as Jerry jokes about having caused his relapse.
