= The Conversion (Seinfeld) =

- Seinfeld episode
- Episode no.: Season 5 Episode 11
- Directed by: Tom Cherones
- Written by: Bruce Kirschbaum
- Production code: 511
- Original air date: December 16, 1993

Guest appearances
- Molly Hagan as Sister Roberta; Kay E. Kuter as Older Priest; Bill Rose as Younger Priest; Kimberly Campbell as Tawni; Jana Marie Hupp as Sasha; Randy Brenner as Waiter; Tom Verica as Doctor; Darlene Kardon as Mrs. Lupchek; Karen Rizzo as Woman Hailing Cab

Episode chronology
← Previous "The Cigar Store Indian"	Next → "The Stall"

"The Conversion" is the 75th episode of the NBC sitcom Seinfeld. It is the 11th episode of the fifth season, and first aired on December 16, 1993. In this episode, George converts to Latvian Orthodoxy so that he can continue seeing his girlfriend, incidentally prompting a Latvian Orthodox novice to consider leaving the order when she becomes smitten with Kramer. Meanwhile, Jerry seeks the advice of Elaine's podiatrist boyfriend after he finds a tube of fungicide in his girlfriend's medicine cabinet.

== Plot ==
George decides to convert to Latvian Orthodoxy after his girlfriend Sasha tells him that her parents will not allow her to date a man who is not a member of their religion. George visits the church and talks to the head priest about converting. When Kramer arrives to pick George up, a novice, Sister Roberta, becomes smitten with Kramer. The priests are worried over Sister Roberta's infatuation and tell Kramer that he has an ephemeral quality (known as "the kavorka") that makes him irresistible to women. Not wanting to be the cause of Sister Roberta leaving the order, he is instructed to buy various foul-smelling foods and wear them, which stinks up the apartment building.

Jerry is disgusted when he sees a tube of fungicide in the medicine cabinet of his girlfriend Tawni. He takes the tube home and asks Elaine to get her podiatrist boyfriend to identify what it is used for, but Elaine and her boyfriend bicker over whether he is "really a doctor". Jerry later finds out that her fungicide was only being used for her cat. At Elaine's apartment, she and her boyfriend are reconciled until he sees the tube of fungicide and is disgusted, thinking Elaine has a fungal infection.

George's parents discover that he is converting and are infuriated. George undergoes the conversion ceremony. Just before he is about to receive the final benediction from Sister Roberta, she reveals her attraction for Kramer. But when he arrives, smelling foul, she loses her attraction.

At Monk's, George tells Sasha that he has converted for her. She is charmed by the gesture but informs him she is moving to Latvia for a year.

== Production ==
Bruce Kirschbaum revealed later that he was unaware that the Latvian Orthodox Church actually existed while writing the episode. His intention was to have a fictitious sect. Kirschbaum received many thank-you letters from the church for bringing attention to the denomination.

The exterior shots of the church are of the Russian Orthodox Cathedral of the Transfiguration of Our Lord in Williamsburg, Brooklyn.
