= The Busboy =

- Seinfeld episode
- Episode no.: Season 2 Episode 12
- Directed by: Tom Cherones
- Written by: Larry David & Jerry Seinfeld
- Production code: 203
- Original air date: June 26, 1991

Guest appearances
- David Labiosa as Antonio; Doug Ballard as Eddie; John Del Regno as Manager

Episode chronology
← Previous "The Chinese Restaurant"	Next → "The Note"
- Seinfeld season 2

"The Busboy" is the 17th episode of Seinfeld to air. It was the third episode produced for the second season, but was the 12th and final episode to air. It aired on NBC on June 26, 1991.

== Plot ==
Out at dinner, Jerry and Elaine peek at a presumed hair transplantation recipient, while George, regretting trying pesto, eats their food. Elaine is smug that Eddie, a visitor from Seattle, was so taken by her that he is returning to stay over for a week. George stamps out a burning menu that a busboy carelessly left next to a candle, and informs the manager while Elaine exaggeratedly complains. The manager reprimands the busboy and fires him. George and Elaine regret causing this, while Jerry, with his conscience clear, guilt-trips them.

Elaine manages to get the ex-busboy's address so that George can go apologize and offer help. With Jerry busy and Elaine borrowing his car to pick up Eddie, Jerry sends Kramer to back up George. George is intimidated by Antonio (David Labiosa), the ex-busboy, who stares him down in silence and only acknowledges Kramer speaking Spanish to him. Because they left his apartment door open, Antonio's cat gets out, and he finally loses his composure and screams at them in English. They fail to find the cat, and Kramer breaks Antonio's lamp. George leaves Antonio his business card.

A week later, George is paranoid that Antonio is stalking him. George and Kramer make Jerry relay their finger-pointing at each other over the phone. Elaine, having quickly fell out of love with Eddie, spent the week faking her period and is now hellbent on seeing him off to the airport punctually. Elaine obsessively plans every detail of the airport trip, even paying a taxi driver to teach her a shortcut off the dreaded Van Wyck Expressway, and buying a new alarm clock.

The alarm does not go off, and Elaine and Eddie oversleep. With only one hour before the flight, Elaine haphazardly packs Eddie's suitcase with maniacal impatience, and sets out with them both half-dressed and barefoot. As George recites his encyclopedic knowledge of public restrooms to Jerry, Elaine arrives, disheveled and crazed from her heroic race against time—thwarted only by a pileup on the very same shortcut she paid for.

Kramer lets Antonio in, to George's horror, but Antonio poignantly thanks George for providentially sparing him from a gas explosion at the restaurant, which killed the busboy who replaced him. He has also found a better job and his cat, in one fell swoop. Leaving, he and Eddie bump into each other. They fight, tumbling down stairs and suffering crippling injuries. George is stuck caring for Antonio's cat, and Elaine for Eddie, indefinitely.

== Production ==
This episode was noted by the supporting cast in an interview used for a DVD set as the first sign that Jerry would be a generous writer, being very good about including the co-stars into simultaneous story lines. Jerry himself does not have a lead role in either of the episode's plots.

Larry David identifies this episode as the first time that multiple storylines intertwined.

This episode was filmed in October 1990, simultaneously with "The Pony Remark" and "The Ex-Girlfriend".

== Reception ==
David Sims of The A.V. Club gave the episode a C+.

It was ranked fifth on a list of Seinfeld's "Not-so-top episodes", compiled by the New York Daily News, choosing the best and worst five episodes of the series.
