= The Barber (Seinfeld) =

- Seinfeld episode
- Episode no.: Season 5 Episode 8
- Directed by: Tom Cherones
- Written by: Andy Robin
- Production code: 508
- Original air date: November 11, 1993

Guest appearances
- Wayne Knight as Newman; Antony Ponzini as Enzo Manganero; David Ciminello as Gino; Michael Fairman as Mr. Pensky; Jack Shearer as Mr. Tuttle; Ken Myles as Mike; Peggy Etra as Clarisse; Dave Richardson as Customer

Episode chronology
← Previous "The Non-Fat Yogurt"	Next → "The Masseuse"
- Seinfeld season 5

"The Barber" is the 72nd episode of the NBC sitcom Seinfeld. It is the eighth episode of the fifth season, and first aired on November 11, 1993. In this episode, Jerry needs to get a haircut behind the back of his usual barber, while George goes to work at a company without knowing if he is hired.

== Plot ==
At a job interview, George gets praised by the interviewer, Mr. Tuttle, as a quick study. Tuttle wants to hire George, but segues into something else that gets interrupted. George is left not knowing if Tuttle was going to give him good news, or bad news—such as the entire company board being under indictment. He is afraid to call back and ask if he was hired, which would mean that he is not a quick study after all.

Kramer and Jerry are regulars at the same corner barbershop, but Kramer is pleased with the younger barber Gino, while Jerry is merely putting up with Gino's uncle Enzo out of twelve years of loyalty. Since Elaine needs Jerry to have a good haircut for once for a bachelor auction for charity, Jerry takes Kramer's advice to get Gino on Enzo's day off. To Jerry's dismay, Enzo is at the shop and insists on taking time out for Jerry. Jerry gets a staid, outdated cut that stupefies George and Kramer, who demand that he end this "self-destructive" relationship.

With Tuttle away on vacation, George decides to start work assuming that he was hired, having nothing to lose except his pride. The other staff take his word for his being hired. George chooses a small office over a big one to stay low-key, and gets assigned the "Pensky file". He fritters away each day doing nothing, and confuses everyone at an office birthday party by acting overfamiliar. Pensky himself visits, and is impressed by George's busywork putting his file in a new folder; he wants to hire George, but segues into something else that gets interrupted.

Jerry backs out of the bachelor auction when Elaine cracks up at his hair. Since Enzo is possessive and "crazy", Kramer sets up an under-the-table haircut for Jerry at Gino's apartment, behind Enzo's back. They only get one minute in before Enzo arrives unexpectedly to apologize for misjudging Gino's beloved movie Edward Scissorhands. Gino hides Jerry, but Enzo recognizes Jerry's hair on the floor. Elaine has no choice but to auction off Kramer instead of Jerry; at the event, she struggles to name Kramer's redeeming qualities, while he struts onto an attendee's table and falls off.

Enzo, obsessed with proving Jerry's betrayal, flatters Newman and offers him free haircuts to collect hair from Jerry. Newman, astonishingly, finds not one stray hair in Jerry's bathroom, so he blatantly gets too close to Jerry to snip off some incriminating hair. Now out for blood, Enzo catches Gino showing Edward Scissorhands to Jerry. With both barbers brought to tears over the movie, disaster is averted.

Tuttle returns, confirming that George has the job, but notices George slacked all week. George quits, assuming that he also has a job with Pensky, only to find that Pensky meant to say that his entire company board is under indictment. Discovering what Newman did, Jerry finds him in the barber shop, menacingly approaching him with an electric razor. Later in a telephone exchange with Kramer, it is revealed that Newman has been shaved bald.

== Music ==
Throughout this episode, the familiar Seinfeld slap-bass incidental music is replaced with selections from the overture of Gioachino Rossini's The Barber of Seville.
