= The Big Salad =

- Seinfeld episode
- Episode no.: Season 6 Episode 2
- Directed by: Andy Ackerman
- Written by: Larry David
- Production code: 602
- Original air date: September 29, 1994

Guest appearances
- Wayne Knight as Newman; Michelle Forbes as Julie; Jerry Levine as Stationer; Marita Geraghty as Margaret; Barry Nolan as Reporter; Dean Hallo as Gendason; Lauren Bowles as Waitress

Episode chronology
← Previous "The Chaperone"	Next → "The Pledge Drive"
- Seinfeld season 6

"The Big Salad" is the 88th episode of the NBC sitcom Seinfeld. This was the second episode for the sixth season. It aired on September 29, 1994. In this episode, George wants credit for buying Elaine a big salad, Elaine avoids the advances of a stationery store clerk, Kramer assumes his golf scorekeeping drove a former baseball star to murder, and Jerry needs to know why his girlfriend was not good enough for Newman.

== Plot ==
A stationery store clerk comes on to Elaine as she special-orders a high-end mechanical pencil for Justin Pitt, so she uses Jerry's number to screen out the clerk's calls. George and Julie are going to lunch at Monk's, and George asks Elaine if she wants him to bring back anything. Elaine asks George to get the "big salad" to go for her. George pays for lunch in a show of modesty, but Julie takes the big salad to Elaine and gets thanked.

Kramer returns from a golf game with former baseball star Steve Gendason, which nearly came to blows when Kramer, splitting hairs, penalized Gendason for illegal ball-cleaning. The news soon reports that Gendason is suspected of murdering his dry cleaner over a stained pair of pants, and Kramer jumps to the conclusion that he might have pushed Gendason over the edge, especially after the police find a golf tee in the dry cleaner.

Disgruntled that Julie "took credit" for the big salad, George offhandedly mentions to Elaine during a cab ride that he bought it, and an annoyed Elaine assumes George just wants to get paid back, later telling Julie as much. Julie confronts George on this later, and after he accuses her of stealing credit, she points out all she did was "hand someone a bag". George vows to never buy Elaine lunch again.

Jerry stays home with Margaret rather than go out, leading to an awkward reunion between her and Newman, who used to date. Jerry learns, to his astonishment, that Newman—who is in no position to turn down women—broke up with her. Demanding to know why, Jerry plays right into Newman's hands and gets told that Margaret was not attractive enough. Haunted by this, Jerry can no longer kiss Margaret, and she throws him out of her car.

Elaine buys the pencil elsewhere, but the clerk has filled her order. Elaine gets guilt-tripped by the clerk's arduous quest at the stationery warehouse and goes out with him after all.

Consumed by a guilty conscience, Kramer goes to see Gendason. Later, on a live news report, the police are in hot pursuit of Gendason as he flees down the New Jersey Turnpike in a white Ford Bronco with Kramer at the wheel. Kramer calls 911, negotiating for free passage to go visit Gendason's pet fish.

== Production ==
Writer/co-creator Larry David got the idea for the episode when Seinfeld editor Janet Ashikaga asked him to get her "a big salad" for lunch. David bought her the salad, but when Jerry Seinfeld's assistant Carol handed it to her, she thanked Carol instead.

The Steve Gendason plot, and in particular Margaret's argument about overwhelming circumstantial evidence and the Ford Bronco chase, satirizes the O. J. Simpson murder case. The episode was written just a few weeks after Simpson's real-world Ford Bronco chase, and actual footage of the pursuit was integrated into the episode.

This episode is the first to use a new exterior set for its New York street scenes. Exteriors were formerly shot using a collection of three storefronts, but the show moved its outside shots to a new, much more expensive street set in Season 6 that allowed for many new camera angles and framing opportunities.
