= Newman (Seinfeld) =

Major character on the TV show Seinfeld

- Wayne Knight as Newman in "The Calzone" (1996)
- First appearance: "The Revenge" (voice only) (1991) "The Suicide" (on-screen appearance) (1992)
- Last appearance: "A Message from Your Friendly Local Mail Carrier" (2020)
- Created by: Jerry Seinfeld and Larry David
- Portrayed by: Wayne Knight
- Voiced by: Larry David ("The Revenge", original broadcast)

In-universe information
- Gender: Male
- Occupation: Mail carrier

Newman is a recurring character in the television show Seinfeld, portrayed by Wayne Knight from 1992 until the show's finale in 1998. He is Jerry Seinfeld's arch-nemesis and Cosmo Kramer's close friend.

== Background ==
Newman makes his first physical appearance in "The Suicide", but he is first established as a character in the earlier episode "The Revenge", in which only his voice (provided by Larry David) is heard. Wayne Knight dubbed over the dialogue for syndication airings. Newman lives in the same apartment building as Jerry and Kramer.

Newman was created as a counterpoint to the Jerry character, though the reason for their animosity is never revealed. Seinfeld once described Newman as the Lex Luthor to his Superman. Knight has described him as "pure evil", as did Jerry in the episode "The Big Salad" when he says "I've looked into his eyes. He's pure evil."

== Personality ==
Newman's role is primarily as Jerry's nemesis and a frequent collaborator in Kramer's elaborate and bizarre schemes. Often described as Jerry's "sworn enemy" ("The Andrea Doria"), Newman is cunning and often schemes against Jerry. He speaks often in a humorously sinister tone (mainly to Jerry). Jerry refers to Newman as "pure evil" on more than one occasion. Jerry's trademark greeting for Newman is to say "Hello, Newman" in a snide and condescending tone, while Newman responds "Hello, Jerry" in a falsely jovial tone. Helen Seinfeld also greets Newman in the same way.

Newman considers Jerry to be undeserving of his fame, referring to Jerry's audience as a "half-soused nightclub rabble that lap up your inane 'observations.'" Newman's own talents as a poet and wordsmith are considerable, yet recognition similar to Jerry's has so far eluded him.

When asked about why the character Jerry hates Newman, Jerry Seinfeld stated in an interview with BuzzFeed Brews that "The real answer [for] why I hated Newman was because it just seemed funny to hate Newman... Everybody has one very eccentric friend that is kind of out there. You've got your friends that are like you, then you have that one friend that's really not like you at all and that's what you like about them, they're kind of an outer orbit. And their friend is someone you cannot deal with at all... but there was no real reason for me to hate Newman, he never did anything bad to me, it was just fun. It was fun to hate him."

Newman is a frequent source of annoyance and problems for Jerry, such in "The Doodle" when Newman's secret use of Jerry's apartment results in a flea infestation, and in "The Raincoats" when Newman gets Jerry into trouble with his parents after he tells them Jerry was making out with his girlfriend during the film Schindler's List. Jerry's response upon discovering Newman is to blame for any situation is to clench his fist and mutter "Newman!"

However, the depth of Jerry and Newman's enmity seems to vary, and Jerry sometimes seems to consider him merely an annoying neighbor, rather than an outright enemy. Occasionally events lead one of them ("The Blood"), or both ("The Soup Nazi"), to briefly forget their differences and at times even work together on some scheme, such as in "The Shower Head" when they join with Kramer to buy black market non-water-saving shower heads. In "The Old Man", Jerry casually mentions "a couple of friends", referring to Kramer and Newman. In "The Soul Mate", Jerry and Newman go to the doctor together to get vasectomies (although they end up changing their minds). In "The Label Maker", Jerry and Newman also attend Super Bowl XXIX together, but only because of a ticket mix-up. Earlier in the same episode, Jerry reluctantly agrees with George that Newman is "merry."

Newman is a good friend of Kramer's, and the pair are forever participating in various get-rich-quick schemes. In "The Bookstore", Newman and Kramer decide to use a rickshaw to transport people from place to place. In "The Old Man", they try to find valuable records to sell for cash, and in "The Bottle Deposit" they attempt to cash-in by transporting New York bottles to Michigan for the higher redemption value, using a U.S. Mail truck obtained by Newman in his job as a letter carrier.

Despite his girth, Newman shows surprising athletic ability. Jerry claims he is a "fantastic" tennis player and he is seen running athletically in several episodes. He can climb trees very well ("like a ring-tailed lemur", as Kramer puts it), a skill he claims to have learned in the Pacific Northwest.

Despite taking pride in his work, Newman is paradoxically portrayed as a slacker who has bad habits like hiding bags of mail in Jerry's storage locker in the basement rather than delivering them. He protests irrationally the idea that any mail is considered "junk" despite his obvious lack of respect for mail. He has been known to occasionally use his position for unethical ends, such as deliberately withholding mail (often utility bills or the like) for the purpose of blackmail, retaliation, or using his union to get out of jail.

He has a few friends from the post office and girlfriends in a couple of episodes. In "The Bottle Deposit", after he is dumped from his mail truck, he seeks refuge in a farmer's house, but is kicked out for having sex with the farmer's daughter, who calls him "Norman" (this was a mistake by the actress/character, not the revelation of Newman's actual first name— the character "Newman" was never given a first name). Newman is also seen with a supermodel after his birthday wish comes true in "The Betrayal".

Newman has unrequited romantic feelings for Elaine over the course of the series, but in "The Reverse Peephole", he rejects her advances when she tries to seduce him to get back a fur coat, out of loyalty to his current girlfriend. In a deleted scene, after the relationship is ended, he approaches Elaine in hopes that her offer is still open.

Newman occasionally gets into schemes with George, as in "The Calzone", when he agrees to buy calzones for George's boss from a pizza restaurant that are on his mail route. In this episode Newman states that he has an animosity towards George too, apparently because he "hangs out with Jerry" all the time.

Newman's angry rants are bombastic and verbose, displaying an impressive command of language. Newman's final monologue against Jerry occurs in "The Finale" after Jerry refuses to take him to Paris:

All right! But hear me, and hear me well! The day will come! Oh, yes, mark my words, Seinfeld! Your day of reckoning is coming, when an evil wind will blow through your little playworld and wipe that smug smile off your face! And I'll be there in all my glory, watching, watching as it all comes crumbling down!

== United States Postal Service ==
Newman is an employee of the United States Postal Service, which is portrayed in the series as a powerful and nefarious, yet bureaucratic and inept organization. When they are arrested in "The Engagement", Newman assures Kramer and Elaine that they will not be prosecuted: "In 20 minutes, that place'll be swarming with mailmen. We'll be back on the street by lunch." Newman's occupation is first revealed in "The Old Man". George, upon learning it, asks "Aren't [postal workers] the guys that always go crazy and come back with a gun and shoot everybody?" Newman's ominous reply is "Sometimes." When asked why, Newman has an outburst about the unending nature of mail delivery.

In "The Junk Mail", Kramer realizes the Postal Service has become obsolete and starts an anti-mail campaign; he is later abducted by Post Office security men. Newman attempted earlier to dissuade Kramer: "You don't know the half of what goes on here." For his efforts to save Kramer, Newman is escorted by Postal Service employees with a bucket on his head, pleading for Kramer to "tell the world my story."

Newman is not very committed to his work for the postal service. In "The Calzone" it is revealed that he has the habit of calling in sick when it is raining. When George questions this and refers to the United States Postal Service creed, Newman simply says that he does not care much for creeds.

In "The Package", Newman's business card is shown; it simply reads "Newman".

Newman claims that he once took over the postal route of serial killer David Berkowitz, otherwise known as the "Son of Sam", who was working for the Postal Service at the time of his 1977 capture. When the police come to arrest Newman in "The Engagement", his first words to them are, "What took you so long?", the same words Berkowitz used when arrested. Newman retains Berkowitz's mail bag as a valuable collector's item. However, in real life, Berkowitz did not have a mail route; he worked as a letter-sorter.

In October 2020, Wayne Knight reprised his role as Newman to deliver an online "public service announcement" regarding the 2020 United States Postal Service crisis. In the video, he accused President Donald Trump of trying to delay voting by mail in the 2020 presidential election by undercutting the Postal Service, asserting that "the only person who can slow down the mail is a mailman."

== Development ==
Series co-creator Larry David conceived the character when writing the script for season two's "The Revenge". Newman was envisioned as Kramer's African-American suicidal friend. He was set to appear in one scene, in which he explained that he jumped from the apartment building, but an awning had broken his fall. Tim Russ, who would go on to star in Star Trek: Voyager, auditioned for the role, as did William Thomas, Jr., known for his appearance on The Cosby Show, who was cast in the part. However, between the first and the second draft, the plot was significantly reduced; the scene in which the character appeared was cut, and Newman's role in the episode was cut down to a brief dialogue with Kramer, with Newman off-screen. David recorded the lines himself, though he was not credited.

While conceiving a plotline for the third-season episode "The Suicide", the writing staff decided to create a friend for Kramer. Though they never had the intention of having the Newman character return on the show, they felt it was easy to use him again, as he had already been introduced. Newman was initially envisioned as the son of the landlord who owned Jerry and Kramer's building, making him able to snitch about the building's inhabitants without being punished for it. However, in between drafts the writing staff decided to make Newman an inhabitant of the building and more of a nemesis to Jerry.

Among the actors who auditioned for the part were Armin Shimerman, Dan Schneider and Wayne Knight. Knight remarked that he was very excited to audition, as he was already a fan of the show. David immediately thought Knight was "terrific" for the part, and was also amused by his hefty appearance as opposed to Kramer's slim figure. Though Seinfeld felt introducing a friend of Kramer might ruin the character's mystique, Knight's performance convinced him otherwise. The part was initially a one-time guest-appearance, but Seinfeld and David were impressed with Knight and felt Newman was a character they could further exploit; as Michael Richards later explained "our show was driven by characters and there was no way they were going to let Wayne Knight go." Newman would remain a recurring character until the series' finale in 1998. To establish better continuity, Knight re-recorded Newman's lines in "The Revenge" for the syndicated version of the episode. Both versions of the dialogue were included on the Seinfeld: Volume 1 DVD boxset.

When it was announced in 1998 that the show would end, Knight proclaimed "I'm gonna burn all of Newman's clothes and those funky black shoes I've been wearing all these years. He dresses like Jack Ruby. Nobody's done more with a muted plaid than I have." Prior to the finale, The New York Daily News asked Knight if he would be interested in a spin-off focusing on Newman, to which he replied, "I think he could show up on Law & Order as a snitch, but as for a weekly dose of Newman, well, I think if occasionally you're hit in the head with a ball-peen hammer, you might get slightly dazed. But if you were getting hit week after week, you might get pissed off."

== Reception and popularity ==
In a Sacramento Bee interview, Wayne Knight explained that he was once pulled over by a police officer who merely stopped him to say "Hello, Newman" to him.

Mike Joy of Fox Sports often responds, "Hello, Newman" when Ryan Newman wins a Monster Energy NASCAR Cup Series race. This has happened in the 2008 Daytona 500 and 2017 Camping World 500.

Newman was ranked No. 1 on a list by TV.com of the ten most annoying neighbors in television. TV Guide included him in a 2013 list, "The 60 Nastiest Villains of All Time". In 2016, Rolling Stone ranked him #16 of their "40 Greatest TV Villains of All Time".

== Appearances ==
- Season 2
  - "The Revenge" (originally voiced by Larry David, dubbed over by Wayne Knight in syndication)
- Season 3
  - "The Suicide"
  - "The Boyfriend" (parts 1 and 2)
  - "The Parking Space"
  - "The Keys"
- Season 4
  - "The Pitch"
  - "The Ticket"
  - "The Pick"
  - "The Old Man"
  - "The Pilot" (cameo)
- Season 5
  - "The Sniffing Accountant"
  - "The Lip Reader"
  - "The Non-Fat Yogurt"
  - "The Barber"
  - "The Marine Biologist"
  - "The Raincoats" (part 2)
- Season 6
  - "The Big Salad"
  - "The Switch"
  - "The Label Maker"
  - "The Scofflaw"
  - "The Doodle"
  - "The Diplomat's Club"
- Season 7
  - "The Engagement"
  - "The Soup Nazi"
  - "The Pool Guy"
  - "The Seven"
  - "The Shower Head"
  - "The Calzone"
  - "The Bottle Deposit" (parts 1 and 2)
- Season 8
  - "The Soul Mate"
  - "The Package"
  - "The Chicken Roaster"
  - "The Andrea Doria"
  - "The Pothole"
  - "The Millennium"
  - "The Muffin Tops"
- Season 9
  - "The Butter Shave"
  - "The Blood"
  - "The Junk Mail"
  - "The Merv Griffin Show"
  - "The Betrayal"
  - "The Reverse Peephole"
  - "The Cartoon"
  - "The Bookstore"
  - "The Finale" (parts 1 and 2)
- Additional appearances
  - "The Over-Cheer" (2014)
  - "A Message from Your Friendly Local Mail Carrier" (2020)
