= The Note (Seinfeld) =

- Seinfeld episode
- Episode no.: Season 3 Episode 1
- Directed by: Tom Cherones
- Written by: Larry David
- Production code: 301
- Original air date: September 18, 1991

Guest appearances
- Ralph Bruneau as Roy; Terri Hanauer as Julianna; Jeff Lester as Raymond; Flo Di Re as Receptionist; Liz Georges as Pam; Paul Rogers as Man in Waiting Room; Dale Raoul as Dental Patient; Joshua Liebling as Billy

Episode chronology
← Previous "The Busboy"	Next → "The Truth"
- Seinfeld season 3

"The Note" is the 18th episode of Seinfeld. It is the first episode of the show's third season. It aired on NBC on September 18, 1991.

== Plot ==
Making small talk during a massage, Jerry tells his physical therapist, Julianna, about a child kidnapping in the news, then idly speculates that he himself or others could be child kidnappers, which Julianna takes as a threat to her own son. Jerry then tells Elaine and George that he could have physical therapy massages covered by insurance if he asked his dentist, Roy, for a fraudulent doctor's note. Hearing this, both book massages at the same clinic as Jerry.

George is assigned a tall, handsome male masseur, and immediately fears being sexually pleasured by the massage. Receiving treatment for a hamstring injury with his pants off, George becomes paranoid that this may have induced an erection, and questions his own sexuality to a skeptical Jerry. He goes on to fixate on a poster of Evander Holyfield, get called out as gay by children for prancing over a puddle, and have intrusive thoughts of men while masturbating.

Being unemployed, George insists, over Jerry's reluctance, on getting a doctor's note from Roy to avoid paying out-of-pocket. They decide to get a note for Elaine as well, not realizing that she filed her own fraudulent note from her gynecologist; this discrepancy causes Roy to be investigated for insurance fraud. Roy is nonchalant, confident that Jerry can get Julianna's cooperation to clear his name. However, Julianna has barred Jerry from her clinic, and Roy is found guilty.

Jerry, George, and Elaine doubt Kramer's sighting of Joe DiMaggio at Dinky Donuts, as Kramer vividly describes DiMaggio dunking a donut with intense focus, which could not be broken even by Kramer banging a table and yelping. Later, eating at Monk's, everyone sees DiMaggio in the flesh, doing just as Kramer described.

== Theme song ==
This is the only episode – other than the original pilot – with a different version of the theme song. Female singers harmonize over the iconic slap-bass tune, an addition made by composer Jonathan Wolff at the request of Jerry Seinfeld, who wanted to add "a little sparkle" to the music, suggesting the addition of some scat lyrics. Seinfeld and executive producer Larry David both liked Wolff's additions, and three episodes were produced with the new style music. However, they had neglected to inform NBC and Castle Rock of the change, and when the season premiere aired, the latter were surprised and unimpressed, and requested that they return to the original style. The subsequent two episodes were redone, leaving this episode as the only one with the additional music elements. Since this episode's end credits play "Joltin' Joe DiMaggio" in place of the theme tune, the full version of the revised theme was never used.
