= The Bizarro Jerry =

- Seinfeld episode
- Episode no.: Season 8 Episode 3
- Directed by: Andy Ackerman
- Written by: David Mandel
- Production code: 803
- Original air date: October 3, 1996

Guest appearances
- Kristin Bauer as Gillian; Tim DeKay as Kevin; Kyle T. Heffner as Gene; Pat Kilbane as Feldman; Mark S. Larson as Vargas; Justina Vail as Amanda; J. Patrick McCormack as Leland; Harry S. Murphy as Office Manager; Dana Patrick as Model #1; Shireen Crutchfield as Model #2; Robin Nance as Model #3; James Lesure as Office Worker; Jason Beck as Bouncer

Episode chronology
← Previous "The Soul Mate"	Next → "The Little Kicks"

"The Bizarro Jerry" is the 137th episode of the American television sitcom Seinfeld. This was the third episode of the eighth season, originally airing on the NBC network on October 3, 1996. The title and plot extensively reference the character Bizarro Superman, originally published by DC Comics. This episode introduced the phrase "man-hands.”

== Plot ==
Elaine breaks up with her boyfriend Kevin, but they decide to remain friends. Kevin proves to be a much more reliable friend than Jerry, leading Jerry to suggest that Kevin is "Bizarro Jerry", and explains to Elaine how the Superman character Bizarro does everything in an opposite manner to Superman.

While using the restrooms at a company called Brandt-Leland, Kramer assists an employee with a printer and is mistaken for a co-worker by the staff. He begins showing up at regular work hours with no contract and no pay, simply appreciating the structure that a steady job adds to his life.

Jerry starts dating Gillian, an attractive woman whose only flaw is that she has "man-hands", meaning her hands are large and strong like a man's. George gets into a club of attractive female models by saying that a photo of Gillian is his late fiancee Susan. He accidentally burns the picture with a hair dryer. Jerry breaks up with Gillian due to her hands. While Jerry tries to get another picture of her from her purse for George, she grabs Jerry's hand, crushing it. Jerry feels jealous and neglected at home, now that Kramer is working, Elaine is hanging out with Kevin and his friends Gene and Feldman (Bizarro versions of George and Kramer, respectively) and George refuses to bring him along to the club.

Kramer develops an ulcer from overwork. He is terminated by Leland because of his incomprehensible report; when he retorts that he does not actually work for the company, Leland replies, "That's what makes this so difficult." Kramer acknowledges that working was a mistake and agrees to spend more time with Jerry.

Jerry, George and Kramer head to the coffee shop and bump into Elaine as she is meeting up with Kevin, Gene and Feldman. Kevin and his friends are kind, considerate and very polite, as opposed to the selfish and obnoxious attitudes of Jerry, George and Kramer, prompting Elaine to stay with her "Bizarro friends". Kevin invites her over, and she meets Vargas, the Bizarro Newman, with whom Kevin is friendly. However, Kevin and his friends are bothered by her behavior, and reject her after she uses her signature "Get out!" shove on Kevin. A saddened Elaine takes her leave.

George tries to use a picture of a model from a magazine to get back into the club, but he accidentally approaches the same model from the magazine picture and is kicked out. Later, he takes Jerry to the location of the club, but all they find is a meat packing plant, with the photo George took from a magazine lying unnoticed on the dirty floor.

In a mid-credits scene, Kevin’s friends console him over the loss of Elaine. The three gather into a group hug, and a tearful Kevin declares, "Me so happy, me want to cry," imitating Bizarro Superman's distinctive speech pattern.

== Production ==
David Mandel wrote the episode after his then–girlfriend Rebecca ended their long-distance relationship. She was self-conscious about what she called her "farm-hands". Mandel was part of a new generation of Seinfeld writers who were fans of the show before working on it, and saw the opportunity to include such self-referential "meta" humor as the Bizarro characters, as the writers were able to rely on audiences being familiar enough with the series in order to understand the jokes. Mandel has described it as his favorite episode of the series.

Kramer's story was inspired by how Mandel often assisted customers at Tower Records who mistakenly thought he worked there. An acquaintance of Mandel's was so ashamed of how physically unattractive the woman who dumped him was that when talking about her, he would show a photo of a different woman, inspiring the George story.

The "man hands" are all close-ups of a male crew member's hands, while actress Kristin Bauer van Straten's real hands were kept off-camera.

Kevin's apartment was modeled to be a Bizarro opposite of Jerry's apartment, with the kitchen and furniture in reverse of Jerry's. Much of Kevin’s belongings are the opposite of Jerry’s, such as healthy food instead of Jerry’s boxes of cereal, a unicycle hanging on his wall instead of a bicycle like Jerry, and a Bizarro statue in place of Jerry's normal Superman statue. The set designers were unable to locate a Bizarro model in time for filming, so they purchased a Superman figurine instead and repainted it to resemble Bizarro. In addition, the exterior of Kevin's apartment is a mirror-image of Jerry's apartment, and the usual musical cues of the show and end credits are played backwards.

== Critical reception ==
At the time of its original airing, John J. O'Connor of The New York Times explained why he found the episode fun: "'Bizarro Jerry' has found Elaine (Julia Louis-Dreyfus) entering a world of virtual reality with a new boyfriend who eerily resembled Jerry except that he was reliable and considerate. Moreover, his friends were physical clones of George and Kramer (Michael Richards). 'It's like Superman's opposite,' observed Jerry, pinpointing the bizarro of the title. Meanwhile, Jerry was dating a beautiful young woman whose only flaw (flaws are inevitable on Seinfeld) was having man's hands: meaty paws, whined Jerry, 'like a creature out of Greek mythology.' Kramer drifted incomprehensibly into a corporate job in which he 'finally found structure' and was able to strut about with a briefcase full of Ritz crackers."

In a retrospective review of two adjacent episodes, David Sims of The A.V. Club writes, "'The Bizarro Jerry' and 'The Little Kicks' are probably two of the better-known season 8 episodes and for good reason – they're a lot of fun." Sims speculates that "'The Bizarro Jerry' just reeks of a concept that Seinfeld wanted to do forever, given his obsession with Superman, and finally got the chance to once he was fully in charge of the show... Elaine finds that Kevin...and his friends are like a weird mirror group to her friends. But it's very effectively staged that it works, even once the joke has become totally familiar – the idea of characters having strange doubles is now one of the oldest sitcom tropes in the book... Elaine, of course, quickly realizes that the bizarro universe is not for her... the whole time she's more of an interested party than anything, examining the bizarro gang like a scientist." Of the "man-hands" segments, Sims says, "Like many a good Seinfeld episode, there's a B-plot nestled in here that feels like the dominant A-plot of another episode, considering what a major meme it became."
