= Cosmo Kramer =

Fictional character in "Seinfeld"

- Seinfeld character
- First appearance: "The Seinfeld Chronicles" (1989)
- Last appearance: "Seinfeld" (2009)
- Created by: Jerry Seinfeld; Larry David
- Based on: Kenny Kramer
- Portrayed by: Michael Richards

In-universe information
- Aliases: Kessler; H. E. Pennypacker; Professor van Nostrand; Dr. Martin van Nostrand
- Gender: Male
- Family: Babs Kramer (mother)

Cosmo Kramer, usually referred to simply as Kramer, is a fictional character in the American television sitcom Seinfeld (1989–1998) played by Michael Richards. The character is loosely based on the comedian Kenny Kramer, a former neighbor of Seinfeld co-creator Larry David. The character Kramer is the neighbor of the series' main character, Jerry Seinfeld, and is friends with George Costanza and Elaine Benes.

His character is that of a lovable rogue, with his trademarks being his upright hairstyle, vintage wardrobe, impractical business ideas and eccentric personality, whose combination led The Atlantic Monthly reviewer Francis Davis to characterize him as a "hipster doofus." The show's writers later adopted this description into the program. Kramer is obsessed with high-quality fresh fruit and occasionally smokes pipes and Cuban cigars. He is also known for his habit of bursting through Jerry's apartment door without knocking, and eating Jerry's food. His antics include frequent pratfalls and a penchant for noisy, percussive outbursts to indicate skepticism, agreement, irritation and a variety of other feelings. He has been described as "an extraordinary cross between Eraserhead and Herman Munster".

Kramer appears in all but two episodes: "The Chinese Restaurant" and "The Pen", in the second and third seasons, respectively. For the pilot episode, Kramer was named "Kessler" to avoid potential legal issues; Kenny Kramer later authorized the use of his name.

== Background and family ==
In "The Trip", Kramer says a man in a park exposed himself to him when he was a young boy. In "The Big Salad" Kramer reveals to Jerry that he grew up in a strict household where he had to be in bed every night by 9:00PM.

Kramer never completed high school; in "The Barber", it is revealed that Kramer has a GED.

Kramer was estranged for a long period from his mother, Babs Kramer, who works as a restroom matron at an upscale restaurant. Unlike George and Jerry, Kramer's character does not have a well-developed network of family members shown in the sitcom. He is the only main character on the show whose father never makes an appearance; in "The Chinese Woman", Kramer mentions that he is the last male member of his family, implying that his father had died. He also mentions in "The Lip Reader" that he has or had a deaf cousin, from whom he learned fluent American Sign Language. Like the other main characters, he has no children.

== Personality ==
[Kramer's personality] is hard to pin down. A profile in The New York Times described Kramer as "cartoon-like" in a piece with a headline calling him "Seinfeld's craziest neighbor". The Los Angeles Times calls him "eccentric" and "flipped-lid". To The Washington Post, he was "goofy". But he's more than so much concentrated comic schtick. Kramer is an attitude. Kramer's revolutionary far more than he's "funny". He's liberating, a one-man guide out of stereotyped sitcom behavior toward the nut-ball stuff that really happens.

— Peter Goddard, The Toronto Star

Kramer was originally envisioned as a recluse who never left his apartment except to visit Jerry. This was the original reason behind why Kramer helps himself to Jerry's possessions and food without any pushback and also why he is absent from the season two episode "The Chinese Restaurant", which takes place entirely outside of the building. However, in season three Kramer starts to join Jerry, Elaine, and George in various scenes outside of the building.

However, Kramer also gets his friends directly into trouble by talking them into unwise or even illegal actions such as parking in a disabled parking space ("The Handicap Spot"), urinating in a parking garage ("The Parking Garage"), committing mail fraud ("The Package") or even hiring an assassin to get rid of a dog ("The Engagement"). Kramer persuades Jerry in particular to do things that he is reluctant to do. Kramer is also known to mooch off his friends, especially Jerry. Kramer regularly enters and uses Jerry's apartment without knocking, and often helps himself to Jerry's food. Kramer also uses tools/appliances of Jerry's, only occasionally with permission, and often returning them in a state of disrepair (if at all).

Kramer is known for his extreme honesty and lack of tact; in "The Nose Job", he tells George's insecure girlfriend that she needs a nose job. In "The Kiss Hello" Elaine tries to take advantage of this personality quirk by inviting Kramer to meet her friend, Wendy, whose hairstyle she feels is outdated, but it backfires when he compliments her. Kramer rarely gets into trouble for his candor, but his friends often do; in "The Cartoon", Kramer makes comments to Sally Weaver, who then blames Jerry for "ruining her life" as a result.

In general, Kramer excels at persuading Jerry into doing things against his better judgment. Kramer has displayed an almost unbending loyalty toward Jerry, such as in "The Millennium" and "The Bottle Deposit", risking the failure of his own plans for Jerry's benefit. Kramer also thought nothing of giving Jerry a large amount of his banked blood in "The Blood". In the same respect, Jerry has helped Kramer out of good will and always seems to forgive and ultimately accept Kramer's mooching tendencies. At times, Jerry is entertained by Kramer's antics, which may also be a factor in the friendship's endurance. However, Kramer is also quick to assume the worst of Jerry, believing him guilty of everything from sabotaging a Miss America contestant (in "The Chaperone") to having a double life as a neo-Nazi leader (in "The Limo"), and is often oblivious to his sentiments. In "The Serenity Now", an emotional Jerry declares a near-brotherly love for Kramer, and Kramer is not even prompted to look away from his current activity, merely responding in a rote tone, "I love you, too, buddy."

He is close friends with Newman; however, like the other main characters, Kramer and Newman frequently get into conflict with each other, most notably in "The Butter Shave", in which Newman attempts to eat Kramer alive. Their get-rich-quick schemes appear in "The Old Man" and "The Bottle Deposit".

Kramer's apartment is the subject of numerous radical experiments in interior design. Oftentimes, the "experiments" never happen due to Kramer's inherent short-attention span, including his plan to eliminate all furniture and build "levels... like ancient Egypt" in "The Pony Remark". He reconstructed the set of The Merv Griffin Show in "The Merv Griffin Show". Inside views of Kramer's apartment are seldom seen, but it's known that he installed hardwood flooring and woodgrain-like wallpaper to, as he explains to Jerry, "give it the feel of a ski lodge." The apartment is centered around a large hot tub and couch styled after a 1957 Chevy. Kramer has also experimented with his apartment entrance, including reversing his peephole "to prevent an ambush" in "The Reverse Peephole" and installing a screen door alongside plants and wind chimes in "The Serenity Now".

Kramer enjoys smoking Cuban cigars. In "The Abstinence" he sets up a smoking club in his apartment, which included a regularly scheduled "pipe night" for those who preferred pipe tobacco to cigars and/or cigarettes. His face gets ruined after so much smoking and he hires Jackie Chiles to sue the cigarette company, but instead gets his image as the Marlboro Man on the Marlboro billboard in Times Square. He hires Cuban cigar rollers in an attempt to make his own Cuban cigars in "The English Patient".

Of the four main characters, Kramer has the fewest on-screen romantic relationships. He has no trouble attracting women, but interactions with them usually begin and end with purely carnal encounters. What few relationships he has are short-lived.

== Development ==
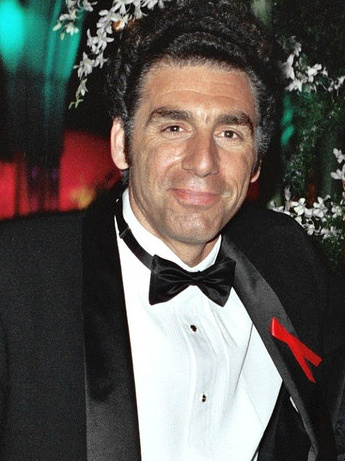
Michael Richards, who played Cosmo Kramer, in 1993

=== Inspiration ===
The character of Kramer was originally based on the real-life Kenny Kramer, a neighbor of co-creator Larry David from New York. However, Michael Richards did not in any way base his performance on the real Kramer, to the point of refusing to meet him. This was later parodied in "The Pilot" when the actor that is cast to play him in Jerry and George's sitcom refuses to base the character on the real Cosmo Kramer. At the time of the shooting of the original Seinfeld pilot, "The Seinfeld Chronicles", Kenny Kramer had not yet given consent to use his name, and so Kramer's character was originally known as "Kessler".

Larry David was hesitant to use Kenny Kramer's real name because he suspected that Kramer would take advantage of this. David's suspicion turned out to be correct; Kenny Kramer created the "Kramer Reality Tour", a New York City bus tour that points out actual locations of events or places featured in Seinfeld. The "Kramer Reality Tour" is itself spoofed on Seinfeld in "The Muffin Tops". In the episode, when Kramer's real-life stories are used by Elaine to pad the biography of J. Peterman she was ghostwriting, Kramer develops a reality bus tour called "The Peterman Reality Tour" and touts himself as "The Real J. Peterman".

=== Development of the character ===
In early episodes, Michael Richards played Kramer slow, but then learned to play him faster by coming up with such things as Kramer's sliding entrances through Jerry's door. "After 13 shows, I started playing him faster so that he's ahead of everybody", Richards said, "There was something deep down inside that just made me feel that this is the character, the way he comes into life, the way he comes into the situation”.

In the second season of the series the trademark physical comedy of the character was introduced. Richards suggested that a scene Larry David had written where Kramer talks about how he took revenge on a washing machine by putting cement in it instead be more visual and acted out physically. Richards has stated that this scene in the episode The Revenge is the scene he is most proud of.

=== Given and surnames ===
Kramer was known only as "Kramer" during the show's first five seasons (from 1990 to 1994). In "The Seinfeld Chronicles", Jerry referred to him as "Kessler", which was his original name for the show, until it was changed to "Kramer". However, in the first draft of the script, he was named "Hoffman". In a flashback in "The Betrayal", Kramer says that his name is incorrectly listed as "Kessler" in the apartment building. This retcons the pilot's use of "Kessler" as the character's name.

George finds out his first name of "Cosmo" through an encounter with Kramer's long-estranged mother, Babs, in "The Switch". For the most part, characters continued to call him Kramer for the remainder of the show's run. The name "Cosmo" was suggested by Larry David; he took the name from a boy who lived in the same apartment building as he and Kenny Kramer.

The episode titled "The Bet" would have revealed Kramer's first name as "Conrad", not "Cosmo", but it was never filmed.

== Employment ==
Despite the failure of the majority of his schemes and his unwillingness to even apply for a normal job, Kramer always seems to have money when he needs it. In "The Visa", George makes a comment about Kramer going to a fantasy camp, and how Kramer's "whole life is a fantasy camp. People should plunk down two thousand dollars to live like him for a week. Do nothing, fall ass-backwards into money, mooch food off your neighbors, and have sex without dating. That's a fantasy camp."

As a younger man, Kramer had several jobs. In the episode "The Strong Box", Kramer says he was briefly in the US Army and claims the reason for his discharge is classified. In the episode "The Muffin Tops", Kramer mentions shaving his chest when he was a lifeguard. His long term unemployed status is explained in "The Strike", when he goes back to work at H&H Bagels after being on strike since 1985. He is fired by the end of the episode.

In the episode "The Bizarro Jerry", Kramer accidentally begins working for a company called Brandt-Leland. Later in the episode, he is "fired" (without actually having ever been employed) when his "work" is assessed and found to be completely meaningless.

He is a compulsive gambler who successfully avoids gambling for several years until "The Diplomat's Club", in which he bets with a wealthy Texan on the arrival and departure times of flights going into New York's LaGuardia Airport.

A struggling (and terrible) actor, Kramer's first gig was a one-line part in a Woody Allen movie in "The Alternate Side" (his line, "These pretzels are making me thirsty", becomes the show's first catchphrase). Although he is fired before completing his scene, he says he "caught the bug" because of it, and briefly moves to Los Angeles to pursue a career in Hollywood, where, in "The Keys", he appeared on Murphy Brown as Steven Snell, Murphy Brown's secretary. After returning to New York, Kramer auditions for the role of "Kramer" in the pilot of a new sitcom called Jerry, using his stage name of Martin van Nostrand ("The Pilot"). He is unable to complete the audition due to an intestinal problem. Kramer later works as a stand-in on a soap opera with his friend Mickey Abbott in "The Stand In" and various other low-paying or non-paying theater projects, such as acting out illnesses at a medical school in "The Burning".

== Inventions, entrepreneurship, and lawsuits ==
Kramer shows an entrepreneurial bent with "Kramerica Industries", for which he devises plans for a pizza place where customers make their own pie ("Male Unbonding"), a bladder system for tankers that will "put an end to maritime oil spills" ("The Voice"), and a product that will put ketchup and mustard in the same bottle.

In "The Friar's Club", he creates a concept restaurant that only serves peanut butter and jelly sandwiches, which he calls P.B. & Js.

He also comes up with the idea of a beach-scented cologne in "The Pez Dispenser", but a marketing executive for Calvin Klein tells him the idea is ridiculous. Despite this, it is revealed in the episode "The Pick" that Calvin Klein began making an ocean-scented cologne. Calvin Klein offers to allow Kramer to be an underwear model, which Kramer accepts.

In "The Doorman", Kramer and Frank Costanza co-develop a prototype for a bra for men called the "bro" or the "manssiere".

In "The Muffin Tops", Kramer initiates The Peterman Reality Bus Tour, charging customers $37.50 for a tour of his life.

Kramer also hatches a scheme to smuggle Cubans to the United States to make Cuban cigars, only to learn the "Cubans" are actually Dominicans ("The English Patient").

He participates in lawsuits against various people and companies and considers himself "very litigious". He is always represented in these lawsuits by Jackie Chiles. In "The Maestro", he settles one such suit (though receiving no monetary compensation) against a coffee company whose beverages are too hot (a reference to the McDonald's coffee case). In "The Abstinence", Kramer sues a tobacco company for the damage its products cause to his appearance, and in "The Caddy", he sues Sue Ellen Mischke for causing a traffic accident.

=== Coffee table book about coffee tables ===
A storyline running throughout the fifth season is the development of one of Kramer's few successful ideas: a coffee table book about coffee tables. Kramer first thinks of the book in "The Cigar Store Indian", although he later claims that he first had the idea when skiing. Throughout the season, his quest to get the book published becomes a running gag. Pendant Publishing (where Elaine and Kramer's then-girlfriend work) decides to publish it in "The Fire".

In "The Opposite", Kramer starts his "book tour" with an appearance on Regis and Kathie Lee. By accidentally spitting his coffee over Kathie Lee Gifford ("All over my Kathie Lee Casuals!"), his book tour goes down in flames. Elaine inadvertently causes the end of Pendant Publishing and therefore the end of Kramer's book. In the episode "The Wizard" it is revealed that the book is being made into a movie. The money Kramer makes allows him to briefly retire to Florida and run for president of the condo board at Del Boca Vista, Phase 3.

The book itself is full of pictures of celebrities' coffee tables, and even had a pair of foldable wooden legs so that it could itself be turned into a coffee table. He also says that he has plans for a coaster to be built into the cover.

Tom Gammill and Max Pross, writers of "The Cigar Store Indian", came up with the idea of the book, and Larry David added on the idea of the foldout legs to turn it into a coffee table.

== Physical moments ==
Kramer's physical eccentricities are a frequent source of humor. His entrance is a recurring gag. He frequently 'slides' into Jerry's apartment, often resulting in applause, as in "The Virgin". In "The Revenge", Kramer clumsily carries a dry sack of cement powder to the washing machine. In "The Foundation", he takes on a group of kids at a karate school, and in "The Van Buren Boys", after giving his stories to Elaine to write, he slips up on the golf balls and lands on the floor. In "The Subway", Kramer fights to get a seat with several people on a subway. He falls a couple times and ends up not getting a seat. Kramer and Newman had been playing the game Risk for a while. When they were done, Kramer drops the game off at Jerry's apartment. Before he puts it onto the table, he clears the table with his leg with papers flying off. When Kramer and Jerry were going to see a movie, Kramer hid his coffee under his shirt due to him not being allowed to bring it in. Kramer then spills the coffee on himself when he was about to sit down, burning himself in the process. Kramer became a model for Calvin Klein when he went to their office. He showed off his buttocks in white underwear in front of a few Calvin Klein executives. Just before they wanted to take him in to their studio, Kramer has a pratfall in the underwear.

== Pseudonyms ==
Like the other three characters, Kramer has pseudonyms he uses in various schemes.

Under the name H.E. Pennypacker in "The Puerto Rican Day", Kramer poses as a prospective buyer interested in an elegant apartment in order to use its bathroom. Kramer also appears as Pennypacker to help Elaine get revenge on a Mayan clothing store, "Putumayo", by repricing all the merchandise in the store with a pricing gun in "The Millennium", though due to a mishap with the pricing gun, Pennypacker instead removes the desiccants from clothes in the store in order to render them "noticeably musty in five years". In this latter capacity, he claims Pennypacker is "a wealthy American industrialist".

In "The Nose Job", Kramer uses the pseudonym Professor Peter Von Nostrand to pose as the betrothed son-in-law of an incarcerated man who once stole his jacket in order to retrieve it from the man's apartment; Kramer's jacket, to which he attributes at least some of his amorous success, is a minor plot point in other episodes until, in "The Cheever Letters", he trades it to a Cuban embassy official for several boxes of authentic Cuban cigars. Later on, he more famously adopts a similarly named alter-ego, Dr. Martin van Nostrand (in addition to "von" instead of "Van", "Nostrand" is also pronounced differently in this alias). As Dr. van Nostrand, Kramer tries to get hold of Elaine's medical chart to erase the negative comments her doctor has made in "The Package". He also uses the van Nostrand alias in the episode "The Slicer", posing as a "Juilliard-trained dermatologist" for a cancer screening at George's company, Kruger Industrial Smoothing. Mr. Kruger later recognizes him as Dr. van Nostrand in "The Strike". Kramer uses the name Martin van Nostrand (without the "doctor" title) while auditioning for the role of himself on the show Jerry in "The Pilot, Part 1".

Kramer is also occasionally called "the K-Man" ("The Barber", "The Bizarro Jerry", "The Busboy", "The Note", "The Hamptons", "The Scofflaw" and "The Soup Nazi").

A derogatory designation for Kramer has been "hipster doofus", a moniker assigned to him by a woman in a wheelchair he once dated in the episode "The Handicap Spot", and occasionally directed at him by Elaine, as in "The Glasses". The nickname was first used in The Atlantic Monthly review of Seinfeld.

== Reception ==
Ken Tucker wrote in a 1992 review in Entertainment Weekly that Kramer is "the most cartoonish, least-defined person in Seinfeld. Kramer is an earnest dope whose long, gangly body always seems to surprise his mind — he's always running, stumbling, bumping into things; he doesn't enter Jerry's apartment so much as he explodes into it." In 1999, TV Guide ranked him number 36 on its '50 Greatest TV Characters of All Time' list.

== In popular culture ==
Paul Buchman, one of the main characters in NBC's Mad About You, apparently sublets his apartment to the Kramer character. Paul and Kramer have a conversation about it in Mad About You episode "The Apartment" (Season 1, Episode 8).

Alternative hip hop group Das Racist indirectly reference Kramer by referring to the show Seinfeld and the actor Michael Richards who portrays him in the song "Rapping 2 U". Justin Roiland voices a parody of Kramer known as "Kramer Guy" (originally known as "Kessler Guy") in the animated series Solar Opposites.
