= George Costanza =

Fictional character in the American television sitcom "Seinfeld"

- Seinfeld character
- First appearance: "The Seinfeld Chronicles" (1989)
- Last appearance: "The Over-Cheer" (2014)
- Created by: Jerry Seinfeld; Larry David
- Based on: Larry David
- Portrayed by: Jason Alexander

In-universe information
- Aliases: Art Vandelay; Donald O'Brien; Biff; Bodysuit Man; T-Bone; Koko; Gammy
- Gender: Male
- Occupation: Representative for Kruger Industrial Smoothing (season 9); Assistant to the Traveling Secretary for the New York Yankees (seasons 6–8); Screenwriter (season 4); Real estate agent at Rick Barr Properties (seasons 1–2)
- Family: Frank Costanza (father); Estelle Costanza (mother); Unnamed brother
- Significant others: Susan Biddle Ross (fiancée, deceased)
- Relatives: Shelly (cousin); Rhisa (cousin)
- Religion: Catholic (by upbringing); Latvian Orthodox Church

George Louis Costanza is a fictional character in the American television sitcom Seinfeld (1989–1998), played by Jason Alexander. He is a short, stocky, balding man who struggles with numerous insecurities, often dooming his romantic relationships through his own fear of being dumped. He is also relatively lazy; during periods of unemployment he actively avoids getting a job, and while employed he often finds ingenious ways to conceal idleness from his bosses. He is friends with Jerry Seinfeld, Cosmo Kramer, and Elaine Benes. George and Jerry were junior high school friends (although in "The Betrayal", Season 9, Episode 8, George says the two have been friends since fourth grade) and remained friends afterward. George appears in every episode except "The Pen" (third season).

The character was based on Seinfeld co-creator Larry David but is surnamed after Jerry Seinfeld's real-life New York friend, Michael Costanza. Alexander reprised his role in an episode of Comedians in Cars Getting Coffee, reuniting with Jerry Seinfeld and Wayne Knight (also reprising their roles as Jerry and Newman, respectively).

== Early life and family ==
George is a son of Frank and Estelle Costanza. George twice mentions that he has a brother. Lloyd Braun is a childhood nemesis who George feels was the son his parents always wanted. George's best friend Jerry Seinfeld described Frank and Estelle as "psychopaths", and said in "The Chinese Woman" that, if they had divorced when George was young, he "could have been normal".

George's father is Italian American. Although never stated explicitly, it is implied that he is Jewish on his mother's side. His mother refuses to ride in a German car, and it is noted that the Costanza household smells like kasha. George also demonstrates casual familiarity with Jewish culture, such as when he explains "shiksappeal" to Elaine and when he exclaims "sweet, fancy Moses!" upon seeing Elaine's dancing. One flashback shows that George had curly hair when he was in high school, resembling a Jewfro.

In "The Junior Mint", George states he grew up in Brooklyn, New York, where he went to a public school. In a previous episode he mentions he went to high school on Long Island. He met Jerry during his youth, and they remained friends from that point on. George and Jerry both attended John F. Kennedy High School, class of 1971. During their high school years, George and Jerry frequently hung out at a pizzeria called Mario's Pizzas, where the former, having the highest score "GLC", would play Frogger (although Frogger debuted in 1981, well after the pair's high school graduation in 1971). George was picked on by his gym teacher Mr. Heyman, who deliberately mispronounced his name as "can't stand ya" and gave him wedgies. He and Jerry then attended Queens College.

Two of George's cousins appear on the show: Shelly, who briefly appears to visit Estelle in the hospital in "The Contest", and Rhisa, whom George plans to date in order to shock his parents in "The Junk Mail". George talks to his parents about his family in "The Money", during which it is revealed that he had an "Uncle Moe", who "died a young man" and an "Aunt Baby", who died at the age of seven of internal problems. It is also revealed that his mother has a "Cousin Henny". In "The Doll", it is revealed that Frank Costanza was born in Italy and has a cousin, Carlo, who still lives there. As of "The Robbery", George had living grandparents whom he had recently visited, although it is never made clear whether these were his maternal or paternal grandparents.

== Personality ==
George is neurotic, self-loathing, mostly selfish, and dominated by his parents, yet also prone to occasional periods of overconfidence that invariably arise at the worst possible time. Throughout Seinfeld's early seasons, despite doing poorly on his SATs and being afraid of embarrassing himself on an IQ test (as depicted in "The Cafe"), George is depicted as moderately intelligent – he mentions interests in the Civil War and musical theatre, and in some early episodes appears almost like a mentor to Jerry – but becomes less sophisticated, to the point of being too lazy even to read a 90-page book (Breakfast at Tiffany's), preferring to watch the movie adaptation at a stranger's house instead. In "The Abstinence", it is discovered that George has what would appear to be genius-level intelligence but can never access it because his mind is always so completely focused on sex. One Chicago Tribune reviewer noted that, despite all his shortcomings, George is "pretty content with himself".

George exhibits several negative character traits, among them dishonesty, insecurity, anxiety, and extreme frugality, many of which seem to stem from a dysfunctional childhood with his eccentric parents Frank and Estelle, and often form the basis of his involvement in various plots, schemes, and embarrassing social encounters. George's extremely narcissistic parents only accept things from George when events revolve around them, and George is blind to see that at the same time his parents treat him like a second grade child. Episode plots frequently feature George manufacturing elaborate deceptions at work or in his relationships to gain or maintain some slight or imagined advantage or (pretend) image of success. He is shown to have an intense fear of commitment. He had success in "The Opposite", where on Jerry's advice he starts to do the complete opposite of what his instincts tell him to do, which results in him getting a girlfriend and a job with the New York Yankees. His anxiety is also evident in "The Note", where he begins doubting his sexuality after he receives a massage from a male masseur.

George refers to himself in the third person (a habit known as illeism) when under extreme stress (e.g. "George is getting upset!"), after befriending a person with a similar trait in "The Jimmy".

George flees a burning kitchen during his girlfriend's son's birthday party, knocking over several children and an old woman so he can escape first in "The Fire". There are moments where George exhibits remarkable courage, but usually accidentally and often in support of inane lies he would rather not confess to. For instance, in "The Marine Biologist", he goes into the sea alone to save a beached whale because his date, a woman on whom he had a crush in college, thinks he is a marine biologist.

George often takes impressive measures to build and maintain relationships with women. In "The Conversion," he goes through the process of converting to the Latvian Orthodox Church as his girlfriend's parents would not let her date somebody outside their religion. The one relationship he holds long-term, with his fiancée Susan, is the one about which he is seemingly least enthusiastic, as shown by his ongoing attempts to postpone, and later cancel, their wedding, and his rather nonchalant reaction when she dies.

He is interested in nice restrooms, and his personal bathroom habits border on obsession. In "The Revenge", he quits his real estate job solely because he is forbidden to use his boss's private bathroom. In "The Voice", he admits that one of the reasons he is staying at a job his boss has asked that he resign from (for feigning a disability) is that it gives him "private access to one of the great handicapped toilets in the city". In "The Busboy", he claims to have an encyclopedic knowledge of the locations of the best public bathrooms in the city. He proves this in "The Bizarro Jerry", when he directs Kramer to "the best bathroom in midtown" at the offices of Brandt-Leland, even describing the layout, marble, high ceiling, and toilets that flush "like a jet engine". In "The Gymnast", he told Jerry that he always removes his shirt when using the bathroom because "it frees me up... no encumbrances". When working for the Yankees, he suggested having the bathroom stall doors stretched all the way to the ground (letting people's legs not be seen while in the stalls). The obsession even comes up in the Seinfeld reunion staged on Curb Your Enthusiasm: years after the series, George is said to have made a fortune on a smartphone app that directs its user to the nearest "acceptable" public toilet anywhere in the world (though he loses most, if not all, of his fortune to Bernie Madoff).

George and Jerry have been best friends since meeting in high school gym class. The extreme closeness of their friendship is occasionally mistaken for homosexuality; "The Outing" deals with a reporter from a New York University college paper mistaking George and Jerry for a gay couple, and, in "The Cartoon", George dates somebody who Kramer insists is merely a "female Jerry".

== Other information ==
=== Susan ===
George becomes engaged to Susan Ross, an executive at NBC who approved his and Jerry's show-within-a-show sitcom pilot. George and Susan date, during which time commitment-phobic George is constantly trying to find ways to end their relationship without actually having to initiate the breakup with her. In "The Engagement", he proposes to her, despite him not having dated her for years. George tries repeatedly to weasel out of his engagement. In "The Invitations", she dies from licking the toxic glue in their wedding invitations. When notified of her death at the hospital, George displays a combination of shock, apathy, and relief. A few moments after being notified of Susan's death, he says to Jerry, Kramer, and Elaine, "Well, let's go get some coffee." Susan's parents appoint him to the board of directors of the Susan Ross Foundation.

George is very bad at meeting women and even worse at maintaining his romantic relationships and, as a result, his relationships usually end badly.

=== Professional life ===
George's professional life is unstable, and he is unable to remain in any job for any great length of time before making an embarrassing blunder and getting fired, and thus he is unemployed for a large amount of time throughout the series.

His original job when the series starts is as a real estate agent; he ends up quitting and getting re-hired, but he is fired immediately afterward for drugging his boss. He always wanted to be an architect or least "pretend to be an architect". He first mentions this desire in "The Stake Out", and claims in "The Race" that he had designed "the new addition to the Guggenheim".

Over the course of the series, he works for a real estate transaction services firm (Rick Barr Properties), a rest stop supply company (Sanalac), the New York Yankees as Assistant to the Travelling Secretary (his longest-running job), a playground-equipment company (Play Now), and an industrial smoothing company (Kruger Industrial Smoothing). He briefly works with Elaine at Pendant Publishing but is fired for having sex with the cleaning woman on his desk in "The Red Dot". He has a very successful interview to become a bra salesman but upon leaving the interview he rubs the fabric of a woman at the elevator who turns out to be head of the company and is immediately fired.

When seeking another job, the interview gets interrupted in the middle and George does not know if he is hired or not, so he decides just to show up anyway, and is soon asked to work on a "Pensky File" that he knows nothing about.

At one point, George works briefly as a hand model in "The Puffy Shirt", and also for his father selling computers in "The Serenity Now".

During Season 4, George gains experience as a sitcom writer as he helps Jerry to write the pilot for the fictitious show Jerry. While pitching the concept of a "show about nothing" to NBC executives, George begins dating NBC executive Susan Ross until "The Virgin", when she is fired. The Jerry pilot is never picked up.

=== Fashion and hairstyle ===
George has balding hair, which is less noticeable in "The Seinfeld Chronicles" or a flashback in "The Slicer", but gets thinner as the series progresses. At the end of "The Scofflaw", he starts to wear a toupee, until Elaine throws it out the window in disgust in "The Beard". He also tries to restore his hair in "The Tape", in which he starts using a Chinese cream that is said to be a cure for baldness. His hair is rarely seen styled. He frequently wears jeans and Nike Cortez sneakers. In "The Trip, Part 1", he mentions that his clothes are color-coded based on his mood. Several times throughout the show, George mentions a desire to "drape" himself in velvet, which he does in "The Doodle". In "The Bizarro Jerry", George can be seen styling his hair based on an Andy Sipowicz poster.

== Art Vandelay ==
Art Vandelay is an alias first used by George in "The Stake Out". To explain their presence in the lobby of an office building, Jerry and George come up with a cover story based around a man they plan to meet named Art Vandelay, an importer–exporter who works in the building. George frequently reuses the invented name as a running joke. In "The Red Dot", George tells Elaine's boss that he frequently reads books by Art Vandelay, who he describes as a "beatnik, from the Village." In "The Boyfriend", George tells the unemployment office that he is close to getting a job at "Vandelay Industries", a latex manufacturer ostensibly located at Jerry's address. He later tells Susan that Art is Elaine's boyfriend as part of a cover story to prevent Susan from learning that he is secretly dating Marisa Tomei ("The Cadillac"). In "The Bizarro Jerry", George asks an office receptionist to see a "Mr. Art Vandelay" as part of a ruse to ask her on a date. In "The Serenity Now", George invents fake customers, one of whom is "Mr. Vandelay", to hide his lack of sales success. In "The Puerto Rican Day", George pretends to be Vandelay (Jerry pretends to be "Kel Varnsen", and Kramer is "H.E. Pennypacker") to take advantage of an open house to watch a Mets game on television. In "The Finale", the name of the presiding judge is Arthur Vandelay, much to George's amazement.

== Development ==
Seinfeld co-creator Larry David based George largely on himself. Seinfeld and David created the character as a foil to Seinfeld's character. In the first draft of the show's pilot script, called Stand-Up at the time, George's name was "Bennett" and he, like Jerry, was a comedian. In that same draft, the scene in the pilot in which George and Jerry discuss a woman Jerry met earlier, instead saw George and Jerry discussing their stand-up act. His name was changed to George, and he became a real estate broker instead. George's last name comes from Michael Costanza, a college classmate of Seinfeld. "Louis", George's middle name, is a homage to Lou Costello, whose 1950s television series The Abbott and Costello Show inspired Seinfeld. Although he is often asked whether he wanted to play the character, Larry David has said that he was only interested in writing the show, and doubted that NBC would have approved of his being cast.

Casting director Marc Hirschfeld stated that, during casting for the character, "we saw every actor we could possibly see in Los Angeles", but they could not find the right actor for the part. Among the auditionees were Nathan Lane, David Alan Grier, Tony Shalhoub, Brad Hall and Larry Miller. Jim Carrey, Rick Moranis, Adam Arkin, Anthony Edwards, Paul Feig, Robert Wuhl, Danny DeVito, Steve Buscemi, Paul Shaffer and Chris Rock were also considered for the role. Rock stated he had discussions about the role. Robert Schimmel also auditioned.

On April 3, 1989, Hirschfeld sent a partial script to Jason Alexander, who was in New York City at the time. Hirschfeld had met Alexander when he was working on the CBS sitcom E/R. Alexander enjoyed the script and felt it read like a Woody Allen film; therefore, he did a Woody Allen impression on his audition tape and bought a pair of glasses to better resemble the actor. Though Alexander thought his audition was "a complete waste of time", both David and Seinfeld were impressed; Seinfeld stated "the second we saw him, like two lines out of his mouth, we went 'That's the guy.'" On April 10, 1989, at 9:00 a.m. Alexander did his first official audition and met David and Seinfeld. While in the waiting room for his final audition, Alexander saw that Larry Miller was also auditioning. Alexander was aware that Miller and Seinfeld were very good friends, and so figured that he would not get the part. After his final audition, he returned to New York City, and when he landed he received a phone call informing him that he was hired.

Many of George's predicaments were based on David's past real-life experiences. In "The Revenge", for example, when George quits his job in a fury only to realize he has made a mistake, he goes back the next day as if nothing happened; this mirrors David's actions while working as a writer for Saturday Night Live, when he quit and then returned to his job in the same manner. When David explained this to Alexander following a remark about the implausibility of the situation, Alexander realized that the character was based on David, and changed his performance from the Woody Allen imitation to what he has called a "shameless imitation of Larry David."

In 1998, Michael Costanza sued the show for US$100,000,000, claiming that he never gave permission for his name to be used and that, because of the character's appearance and behavior, he was not treated with respect. Costanza lost the suit, as the New York Supreme Court decided that Seinfeld and David "did not violate Michael Costanza's privacy rights when they created the character".

== Reception ==
In a list of the "50 Greatest Sidekicks" compiled by Entertainment Weekly, George was placed third, behind Robin from the Batman franchise and The Tonight Show Starring Johnny Carson co-host Ed McMahon. On a Florida Times-Union list of the 50 greatest sitcom characters of all time, George was ranked third, behind Lucy Ricardo from I Love Lucy and Barney Fife from The Andy Griffith Show. In 1999, TV Guide published a list of the 50 best characters in television history, on which George was ranked 10th. The People called George the greatest television character on a list of the 100 best television characters. British comedian Ricky Gervais and Guardian columnist Marina Hyde have both called George "arguably the greatest sitcom character of all time".

For his performance as George, Alexander was nominated for various awards. In 1992, he received his first Primetime Emmy Award nomination in the category Outstanding Supporting Actor in a Comedy Series; however, he lost the award to Michael Jeter for Evening Shade. He received nominations in the same category the following six years, but failed to win each year. In addition, Alexander was nominated for four Golden Globe Awards—in 1993, 1994, 1995, and 1998—in the Best Supporting Actor in a Series, Miniseries or Motion Picture Made for Television category, but never won the award. In 1995, Alexander received the Screen Actors Guild Award for Outstanding Performance by a Male Actor in a Comedy Series, he also shared the Screen Actors Guild Award for Outstanding Performance by an Ensemble in a Comedy Series with Seinfeld, Louis-Dreyfus, and Richards. From 1996 through 1998, Alexander was nominated in the same two categories, co-winning the ensemble award in 1997 and 1998. In 1999, he was nominated for Outstanding Performance by a Male Actor in a Comedy Series for the last time, but lost to Michael J. Fox for his portrayal of Michael Flaherty on Spin City. In 1992 and 1993, Alexander won the American Comedy Award for Funniest Supporting Male Performer in a TV Series. He was also nominated for the award in 1996 (with Richards) and 1999 but did not win again.
