= Jerry Seinfeld (character) =

Seinfeld protagonist

- Seinfeld character
- First appearance: "The Seinfeld Chronicles" (1989)
- Last appearance: "The Over-Cheer" (2014)
- Created by: Jerry Seinfeld; Larry David
- Portrayed by: Jerry Seinfeld

In-universe information
- Aliases: Kel Varnsen; Dylan Murphy
- Species: Human
- Gender: Male
- Occupation: Comedian
- Family: Morty Seinfeld (father); Helen Seinfeld (mother); Unnamed sister
- Relatives: Leo (uncle); Mac (uncle); Stella (aunt); Silvia (aunt); Rose (aunt); Jeffrey (cousin); Artie Levine (cousin); Douglas (cousin); Nana (grandmother); Unnamed grandfather (deceased)
- Religion: Judaism
- Nationality: American

Jerome "Jerry" Seinfeld (/ˈsaɪnfɛld/; SYNE-feld) is the title character and the main protagonist of the American television sitcom Seinfeld (1989–1998). The straight man among his group of friends, this fictionalized version of comedian Jerry Seinfeld was named after, co-created by, and played by Seinfeld himself. The series revolves around Jerry's misadventures with his best friend George Costanza, neighbor Cosmo Kramer, and ex-girlfriend Elaine Benes. He is usually the voice of reason amid his friends' antics and the focal point of the relationship.

In contrast to the series' supporting characters, he rarely runs into major personal problems. Jerry is the only main character on the show to maintain the same career (a stand-up comedian, like the real Seinfeld) throughout the series. He is the most observational character, sarcastically commenting on his friends' quirky habits. Much of the show's action takes place in Jerry's apartment located in New York City at 129 West 81st Street, apartment 5A (3A in seasons 1 and 2). He and his friends also frequently have coffee or meals together at Monk's Café.

Jerry appears in all 180 episodes of Seinfeld (including several two-part episodes), the only character in the show to do so.

== Personality ==
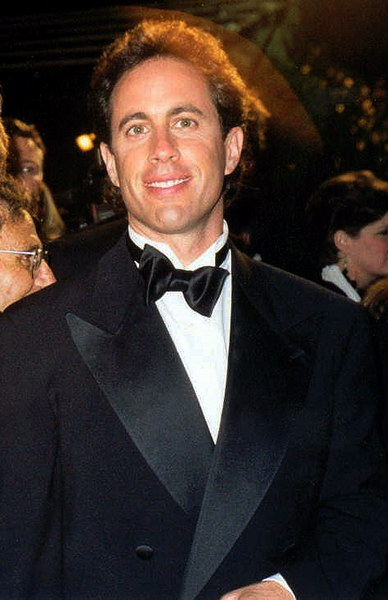
Jerry Seinfeld, who plays the fictionalized version of himself on the show.

In the show's setting, Jerry is the straight man, a figure who is "able to observe the chaos around him but not always be a part of it". Plot lines involving Jerry often concern his various relationships. Apparently afraid of commitment, Jerry often finds minor reasons to break up with women, such as her eating peas "one at a time".

Jerry is the ex-boyfriend and still friend of Elaine Benes, who comments on this behavior as: "You know, every time I think I'm sure that you're the shallowest man on earth, you find a way to drain another couple of inches out of the pool." Elaine points out that he has "never felt remorse."

Jerry will often nonchalantly state, "That's a shame" when something bad happens. A recurring joke is Jerry behaving unchivalrously towards Elaine, such as not helping her carry groceries or heavy objects, ignoring her when she is upset, and taking a first-class upgrade on a flight for himself, leaving Elaine in economy. Jerry, George and Elaine all share a general trait of not letting go of other characters' remarks and going to great lengths to be proven right. In one episode, Jerry rents a house in Tuscany, just because Elaine's boyfriend told him there were none available (though he never actually wanted to rent the house, but was only inquiring if he theoretically could rent one).

Despite his usual indifference to his friends and their actions, Jerry apparently is very satisfied with his life, and feels worried about anything that might threaten the group lifestyle. In "The Invitations", for example, Jerry admits that he feels depressed about George getting married, seeing as how George will eventually leave the group and Jerry will never see him again. Once Elaine tells him that she is also "getting out" of the group, Jerry becomes so worried about a near future of just him and Kramer that he unknowingly almost walks into a car while crossing the street. In "The Bizarro Jerry", Jerry also grows panicky about losing the group dynamic when Kramer becomes too busy with his job and Elaine temporarily leaves to join the Bizarro group, claiming that "The whole system's breaking down!" In a deleted scene from the episode "The Letter", he claims that his friends are "not more important" than his girlfriends, but "they're as important."

Unlike George and Elaine, Jerry rarely runs into major personal problems. In "The Opposite", this tendency is explicitly pointed out, as Jerry goes through a number of experiences after which he invariably "breaks even", while his friends are going through intense periods of success or failure. In "The Rye", during a particularly trying time for Elaine, she angrily tells Jerry, "You know, one of these days, something terrible is going to happen to you. It has to!" Jerry simply replies, "No, I'm going to be just fine." Many of the problems he does run into are the result of the actions of his nemesis Newman, a postal worker. In the series finale, Jerry's streak of getting away with things is broken when he, and the rest of the group, are arrested for their indifference toward a mugging victim and sentenced to jail after multiple witnesses testify to their poor character.

Jerry always wears a suit whenever he has to do his stand-up comedy act. Like George, Jerry's hairstyle remains relatively unchanged throughout the series, with an exception being made during "The Barber".

As in real life, Jerry is a fan of comic book characters, particularly of Superman. He often holds earnest discussions about the character and relates his friends' situations to concepts and characters from the Superman world. A Superman statue is a regular fixture of his apartment. In "The Race", Jerry is excited to date a woman named Lois as she has the same first name as Superman's love interest, Lois Lane.

Jerry is very successful financially, and occupationally stable in comparison with his friends. He never seems to be at a loss for money, in comparison to both George and Elaine, whose careers go through both highs and lows. Throughout the series Jerry suffers numerous financial and material losses, but these do not seem to have long-term impacts on his situation. For example, Jerry buys his father a Cadillac Fleetwood and in "The Money" buys it back after his parents sell it, spending over $20,000. In "The Apartment", it is revealed that Jerry could easily lend Elaine $5,000 for an apartment. Despite his apparent financial security, his parents offer to pay for everything when they visit him (his father even insisting on paying dinner despite losing his wallet, as seen in "The Watch") and occasionally urge him to find a new job.

Jerry has an obsessive insistence on cleanliness and neatness. In "The Pothole", Jerry inadvertently knocks his girlfriend's toothbrush into the toilet bowl, and after she uses it, he is unable to bring himself to kiss her. As revenge, she puts one item of his in the toilet without telling him what it was; a distraught Jerry, thinking it could be anything, ends up throwing away virtually every item in his apartment in panic. Elaine suggests that his cleanliness verges into a serious disorder. In "The Voice", he throws out a belt because it touched the edge of a urinal. In "The Couch", after Poppie's gastrointestinal disorder causes him to urinate on Jerry's couch, Jerry, rather than having the cushion cleaned, gives the couch away.

== Background ==
Jerry and George grew up in New York City. George recalls in "The Outing" that the two were friends ever since an encounter in gym class in their school days. In "The Betrayal", Jerry mentions that he once beat George up in the fourth grade. Flashbacks in episodes such as "The Library" portray Jerry and George in high school. A pizzeria which they frequented is portrayed in "The Frogger". Jerry and George attended school together at Edward R. Murrow Middle School, John F. Kennedy High School and Queens College.

After college, Jerry briefly worked as an umbrella salesman and claims to have invented the "twirl" to make the umbrella look more attractive. He eventually quit the job in order to focus more on his comedy career.

== Family ==
Jerry's parents are Morty and Helen Seinfeld, a retired Jewish couple living in Florida. Unlike George, who usually cannot stand his parents, Jerry gets along reasonably well with his parents, but he still prefers they live in Florida rather than New York, so that they do not interfere with his private life (a situation he calls a "buffer zone"). Although he was born and raised Jewish and in his adulthood still considers himself a Jew, Jerry apparently does not practice and generally does not observe many traditions. In "The Bris", he implies he is circumcised, repeatedly asking people if they have "ever seen one" in reference to an uncircumcised penis. He also mentions having a sister in the episode "The Chinese Restaurant", though she is never named, never appears on screen, and is never mentioned again after this episode. In order to avoid his old friend Joel in "Male Unbonding", Jerry pretends to have promised to tutor his nephew. It is unclear whether the nephew really exists or is simply fabricated as part of the excuse. Jerry's parents are the only two recurring characters who have appeared alongside Jerry, Elaine, George and Kramer in all nine seasons.

Jerry has an eccentric uncle, Leo, who appears in 15 episodes. Uncle Leo has a son, Jeffrey, who works for the Parks Department, about whom he constantly talks, but who never appears onscreen. In "The Stake Out", Jerry speaks of an uncle named Mac, as well as a cousin named Artie Levine. In "The Truth", Jerry mentions a cousin named Douglas who has an addiction to Pepsi. In "The Pony Remark", Helen, Morty, Jerry, Elaine and Leo attend a 50th-anniversary party for Manya and Isaac, an elderly couple whose relationship to Jerry is never explicitly defined. Manya is described as a Polish immigrant. In the same episode, Jerry references having an Aunt Rose, and Helen mentions a family member named Claire who is getting married. In "The Soup" episode, Jerry mentions an Aunt Silvia, whom he compares to Elaine in terms of conversation.

Jerry's maternal grandmother, Nana, is an elderly woman with memory problems, occasionally unable to tell the past from the present, living alone in the city. Nana makes appearances in "The Pledge Drive", "The Kiss Hello" and "The Doodle".

== Reception ==
In 2007, Entertainment Weekly placed the Jerry Seinfeld character eighth on their list of the "50 Greatest TV icons". For his portrayal, Jerry Seinfeld was nominated four times for the Golden Globe Award for Best Actor – Television Series Musical or Comedy, out of which he won one, along with being nominated five times for the Primetime Emmy Award for Outstanding Lead Actor in a Comedy Series, which he never won.
