= The Chicken Roaster =

- Seinfeld episode
- Episode no.: Season 8 Episode 8
- Directed by: Andy Ackerman
- Written by: Alec Berg & Jeff Schaffer
- Production code: 808
- Original air date: November 14, 1996

Guest appearances
- Wayne Knight as Newman; John O'Hurley as J. Peterman; Mark Roberts as Seth; Kymberly Kalil as Heather; Michael D. Roberts as Ipswich; Wesley Leong as Clerk; Christopher Aguilar as Burmese Boy

Episode chronology
← Previous "The Checks"	Next → "The Abstinence"

"The Chicken Roaster" is the 142nd episode of the sitcom Seinfeld. This was the eighth episode of the eighth season, originally airing on NBC on November 14, 1996. The episode's story follows the mishaps that ensue when Kenny Rogers Roasters opens a branch in the characters' neighborhood. The restaurant's neon sign atop the roof shines into Kramer's apartment, disturbing first him and then Jerry after they switch apartments, but Jerry opposes Kramer's efforts to shut the restaurant down since a college friend of his is assistant manager at the branch. Meanwhile, Elaine is in danger of being fired from J. Peterman after she misuses the company account for personal purchases.

Much of the episode's plot was inspired by a real-life confrontation between a Kenny Rogers Roasters branch and a neighboring law office, and some scenes were filmed on location at a real Kenny Rogers Roasters branch.

== Plot ==
A Kenny Rogers Roasters restaurant opens across the street from Jerry's apartment building, with a gigantic neon sign in the shape of a chicken atop the roof. The red light from the sign beams into Kramer's apartment, keeping him from sleeping, so he hangs a banner saying "Bad Chicken" from his window in an attempt to give the restaurant a bad reputation and get rid of the light. To escape the red light, Kramer switches apartments with Jerry. Newman brings over a box of Kenny Rogers Roasters chicken, to which Kramer becomes addicted. Jerry cannot sleep in Kramer's apartment and begins taking on Kramer's mannerisms, while Kramer becomes more like Jerry. Jerry spots Newman buying broccoli with his chicken at Kenny Rogers and deduces that Kramer is the one actually ordering the food, since Newman hates broccoli. Jerry confronts Kramer and forces him to move back into his apartment.

Jerry runs into a college buddy named Seth, whom he persuades to blow off a business meeting to have lunch together. He later learns that Seth was fired after missing the meeting, but has since found a new job as the assistant manager of the Kenny Rogers outlet.

Elaine is audited by the J. Peterman accounting department after charging personal purchases to the Peterman account, including a sable Russian hat for George. Elaine is able to justify all her purchases as business expenses, except for George's hat, which cost $8,000 and must be returned. George gets a date with Heather, the saleswoman who sold the hat. Heather is annoyed by George, so he leaves the hat behind in her apartment as an excuse to come back, planning to win her over with sheer persistence. When George tries to reclaim it, Heather insists the hat is not in her apartment. As an act of revenge, he steals Heather's clock. Jerry directs Elaine to Kramer's friend Bob Sacamano, who sells Russian hats. However, the Peterman accountant is not fooled by the substitute hat, which is made of nutria fur. To save her job, Elaine sets off for Burma to seek the approval of J. Peterman himself. Peterman agrees to sign off on the purchases, but is interested in seeing the hat and is disturbed by the recent catalog products sold under Elaine’s tenure as president. Jerry shakes the rain-soaked nutria hat while at Kenny Rogers Roasters, covering the customers' food with fur and prompting a shutdown of the restaurant. The neon light goes off, and Kramer puts up a new banner, "Kenny Come Back".

George thinks Heather is wise to his theft of her clock and willing to make a swap for the hat. When they meet on a park bench, however, Heather tells him she wanted to meet because she has become attracted to him. She leaves in disgust when she discovers her stolen clock in George's possession.

== Production ==
Seth's blowing off an important meeting to catch up with Jerry was based on a real-life encounter the episode's writers Alec Berg and Jeff Schaffer had with a college buddy (also named Seth) while walking the streets of New York City in search of ideas. Berg and Schaffer recounted, "In the middle of lunch he was talking about his new job, how he was part of this panel that had just formed, and they were going to do this new big project. And we were like, 'Oh, that sounds exciting.' He goes, 'Yeah, that's actually... [looks at watch] ...kind of where I'm supposed to be now.' And we realized that he had blown this giant meeting just to see us. And we were really just being polite." Jerry and Seth's mutual friend Moochie was named after a high school friend of the real Jerry Seinfeld.

Berg and Schaffer had a friend named Billy who was living in Russia for a time and wanted to buy a Russian hat, but had been warned that some of the hats are actually made of nutria fur which flies everywhere if it gets wet. Berg and Schaffer became interested in working this into an episode, especially since they liked the phrase "rat hat".

The episode's Kramer story was inspired by a real-life confrontation between a New York City branch of Kenny Rogers Roasters and a neighboring law office. Berg and Schaffer had been wanting to do a story in which Kramer's apartment is bathed in red light for years, getting the idea from an apartment which Schaffer’s brother lived in; the apartment was bathed in red light from the Empire Hotel across the street. However, they were unable to develop the idea into a story until they heard of the law office which was hanging up signs like "bad chicken" due to the stench from a Kenny Rogers Roasters venting up into their office. The real Kenny Rogers Roasters restaurant chain initially balked at this episode, claiming that the scene in which Jerry covers everyone's food with rat fur would be bad publicity. The writers claimed they would alter the storyline, but later admitted that they were lying and had no ideas for a rewrite.

Kramer actor Michael Richards was virtually a vegan, so during the scene where Kramer eats chicken in bed, he actually only chewed chicken skin, and spat it out into a bucket between takes.

According to director Andy Ackerman, Jerry Seinfeld pulled off his Kramer impersonation as perfectly on the first rehearsal as he does in the finished episode.

Scenes which were filmed but deleted before broadcast include the silhouette of Mr. Marbles (Kramer's doll) approaching Jerry with a knife, George cleaning mustard off his sable hat, and Elaine tracking Peterman by noting Myanmar natives wearing clothes from the J. Peterman catalog.

== Cultural references ==
J. Peterman's behavior in Burma is a parody of Colonel Kurtz in Joseph Conrad's Heart of Darkness and the film based on that novel, Apocalypse Now.

== Critical response ==
Eleanor Hersey, an English professor at Fresno Pacific University, discusses Peterman's company in her 1999 essay "It'll Always Be Burma to Me: J. Peterman on Seinfeld," which begins with her premise:

The appearance of J. Peterman on Seinfeld in May 1995 marks the convergence of two significant 1990s media phenomena: the clothing company that redefined the rhetorical conventions of the mail-order catalogue and the television series that redefined the plot conventions of the situation comedy. The influence of these phenomena on one another is striking: while Seinfeld writers predicted and possibly contributed to the real J. Peterman Company's collapse, the presence of Peterman stretched the limits of Seinfeld's status as a show "about nothing." Although J. Peterman catalogues have inspired many satirical commentaries, the foppish character played by John O'Hurley may have had the greatest impact on the real J. Peterman's image as an icon of rugged masculinity and world conquest. At the same time, Peterman's character compelled Seinfeld writers to address issues of colonialism and racial stereotypes that the series had avoided in its attempt to maintain a generally "liberal" but largely apolitical status.

Hersey examines Elaine's wavering corporate ambitions, her relationship with her haughty, eccentric boss and the male power structure at the company, the seduction of consumers by way of clever advertising, and the significance of Peterman's and Kramer's attitudes toward Burma. Pointing to Jerry's query to Elaine about what she gained from a trip to Mexico, "Anything you couldn't have gotten tearing open a bag of Doritos and watching Viva Zapata!?",) Hersey argues that Seinfeld's silence about racial issues is not entirely silent and does, in fact, constitute a political statement. Michael Richards won his third and final Emmy for the series with this episode.
