= Vincent Tan =

Malaysian business magnate

Yang Berbahagia Tan Sri Dato' Seri Vincent Tan Chee Yioun PSM SJMK SSMT SIMP SPMT
- 陳志遠
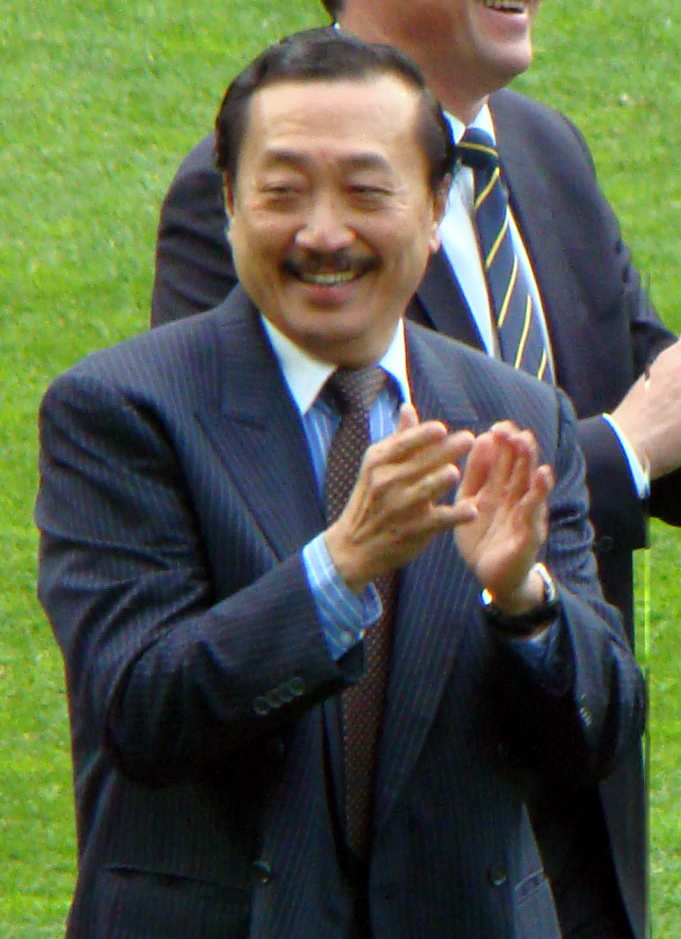
- Tan in 2012
- Born: Tan Chee Yioun; 23 February 1952 (age 74); Batu Pahat, Johor, Malaya
- Citizenship: Malaysia
- Education: Batu Pahat High School
- Occupations: Business magnate; investor; philanthropist
- Years active: 1984–present
- Title: Founder & Advisor of Berjaya Corporation Berhad; Owner of Cardiff City & K.V. Kortrijk
- Spouse: Esther Tan
- Children: 11, including Chryseis Tan, Robin Tan and Nerine Tan
- Parents: Tan Lam Hui (father); Low Siew Beng (mother)
- Relatives: Danny Tan (brother)
- Awards: Order of Loyalty to the Crown of Malaysia (1991)

Vincent Tan Chee Yioun (Chinese: 陳志遠; pinyin: Chén Zhìyuǎn; Pe̍h-ōe-jī: Tân Chì-uán; born 23 February 1952) is a Malaysian business magnate and investor who is the founder and chairman of Berjaya Corporation, a diversified conglomerate listed on the Malaysian stock exchange. Besides holding stakes through the Berjaya Corporation group of companies, Tan's other stakes include interest in internet–related businesses, water utilities, media, retail and telecommunications.

In 2010, he entered the Forbes billionaire list, with an estimated worth of USD 1.6 billion (RM4.2 billion). Tan's success in the Malaysian business sector has been attributed in part to his close association with prominent Malay political figures. As of April 2024, Forbes estimated his net worth at $730 million, making him the 29th richest person in Malaysia.

== Early life ==
Tan was born in Batu Pahat in 1952, and studied at Batu Pahat High School. He had originally planned to study law in New Zealand, but as his father's business was failing, he found work as a clerk in a bank instead. He then sold life insurance for AIA and became an agency manager for the company.

Tan then started private companies in trading, credit, general insurance and real estate. He started a joint venture with Tokio Marine & Fire Insurance that became United Prime Insurance. In 1981, he won a McDonald's franchise in Malaysia, took an advance operations course at Hamburger University, and became the managing director of McDonald's Malaysia in 1982.

== Business ==
=== Berjaya Corporation ===
In 1984, Tan moved into Berjaya, which purchased 48% of the consumer durables company Regnis the same year. Tan had association with the then finance minister Daim Zainuddin. In 1985, Tan bought 51% of Sports Toto from the Malaysian government. Pre-tax profit of Sports Toto rose from RM 5 million in 1985 to RM 36 million by April 1989. He injected his shares in Sports Toto into Berjaya to gain control of Berjaya. In 1988, he swapped his shares in Berjaya for Raleigh Bhd, a lost-making company linked to Daim, which was then renamed Inter-Pacific and turned into Berjaya's holding company. Under his leadership, Berjaya's pretax profit rose from RM 700,000 in 1984 to RM 70 million in 1989.

In 2010, Tan received a gaming license for his wholly owned subsidiary Ascot Sports Sdn Bhd. However, the license was revoked in October 2010, and as of July 2018 the government said it had no plans to reissue it.

Below are the listed subsidiaries under Berjaya Corporation Berhad:

- Berjaya Land Berhad
- Sports Toto Berhad (formerly known as Berjaya Sports Toto Berhad)
- Berjaya Food Berhad
- REDtone Digital Berhad
- Berjaya Philippines Inc.

=== Football ===
==== Cardiff City ====
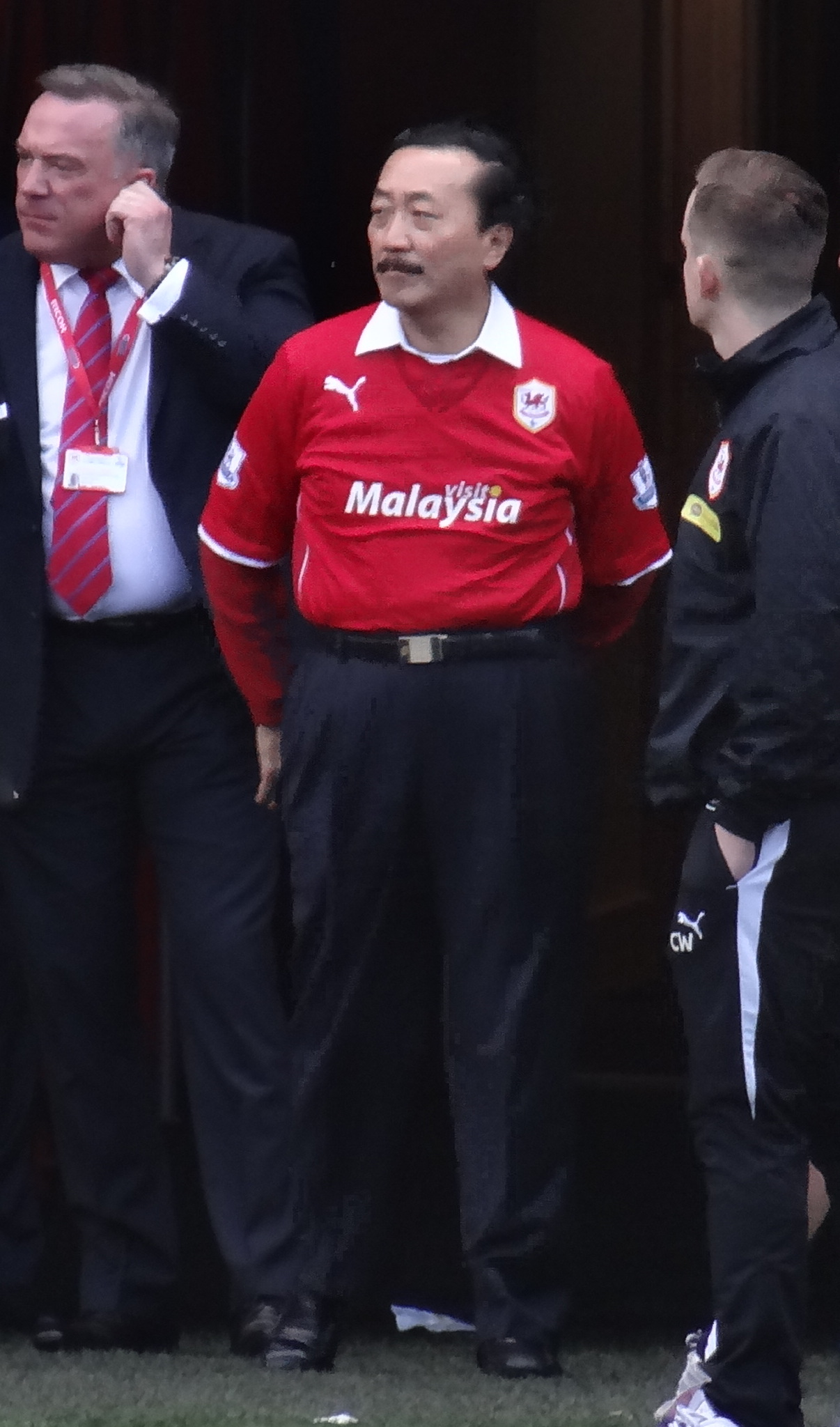
Tan in the rebranded red Cardiff City home kit

In May 2010, Tan became the owner of Cardiff City after a consortium of Malaysian investors (led by Dato Chan Tien Ghee) bought 30% of the club's shares.

In May 2012, the consortium said they would invest £100 million to increase the stadium's capacity and build a new training ground, providing they were given permission to rebrand the club from blue to red. The plans sparked outrage among Cardiff supporters, who quickly organised an emergency meeting to discuss how they would respond to the proposal. The plans were subsequently dropped.

One month later, the club went ahead with the rebranding, to expand Cardiff's appeal in foreign markets. Cardiff's badge was redesigned to include a red dragon, while their home kit was changed from blue to red. The club's £30 million debt to the Langston Corporation was also cleared.

In April 2013, following Cardiff's promotion to the Premier League, Tan promised to spend £25 million to help Cardiff establish themselves in the top flight, and publicly stated his interest in listing his 36.1% stake on the Kuala Lumpur Stock Exchange (KLSE). An initial public offering (IPO) would sell shares in the club to the public for the first time, in an attempt to gain capital to expand the business.

In October 2013, Tan created more controversy after suspending Iain Moody, the club's head of recruitment, who had apparently overspent by £15 million during the summer transfer window. Moody was initially added to the backroom staff by then manager Malky Mackay, and helped Cardiff sign several players ahead of their inaugural Premier League campaign. He was replaced by Alisher Apsalyamovby, a 23-year-old Kazakh who was previously on work experience with the club and is a friend of Tan's son. A few months later, following an investigation over Apsalyamovby's visa, he was forced to leave the club.

Despite going over budget during the summer, Mackay publicly stated his plans to boost his squad during the January transfer window, which upset Tan, who said that no money would be made available. Mackay said he would not resign following Tan's criticism, and was subsequently backed by Cardiff fans. Towards the end of December, Tan told Mackay to resign or be sacked. He managed two more games before being sacked. After his sacking, it was alleged that Mackay had sent texts of an anti-Chinese nature, which was defended by Dave Whelan, owner of his subsequent employers Wigan Athletic. Tan responded by calling both of them racists, and saying "I hope that stops at two racists in Wigan, not snowballing to 2,000 or 20,000 racists in Wigan."

On 2 January 2014, former Manchester United striker Ole Gunnar Solskjær was hired as Mackay's replacement, but he was unable to save Cardiff from relegation. Solskjær left the club later that year and was replaced by Russell Slade.

In October 2016, Tan hired Neil Warnock, at the time the oldest working coach in Britain, as manager. By 2018, Cardiff City had been promoted to the Premier League once again. In their one season back in the Premier League, they finished 18th and were relegated back to the Championship.

==== FK Sarajevo ====
In December 2013, Tan bought Bosnian club FK Sarajevo. Under the deal, Cardiff will cooperate with FK Sarajevo, exchanging players and taking part in a football academy, yet to be established, which Tan has said will lure new talents. FK Sarajevo have since brought in players such as Miloš Stojčev, Džemal Berberović and Nemanja Bilbija, who helped the club win the 2013–14 Bosnian Cup, their first title since winning the domestic Premier League in 2006–07. Prior to the Cup triumph, Robert Jarni was brought in as manager of the club in December 2013 by Tan, but was dismissed after only four months (on 7 April 2014, while the team were still in the semi-finals of the Bosnian Cup) because the club had failed to keep their chances of winning the premier league title alive during the later stages of the 2013-14 season. In July 2014, FK Sarajevo played a friendly match against Tan's Cardiff City FC U21, winning 4–1. FK Sarajevo qualified for the Play-off round of the 2014–15 UEFA Europa League, where they lost to German Bundesliga side Borussia Mönchengladbach.

In May 2014, the heaviest rains and floods in 120 years hit Bosnia and the surrounding region. The worst affected areas were the towns of Doboj and Maglaj, which were cut off from the rest of the country when all major roads flooded. Damage from landslides and floods was estimated to run into hundreds of millions of euros and twenty-four people were killed. The cost of the disaster, officials said, could exceed that of the Bosnian War. In June 2014, Tan made a personal donation of €114,000, while the people of Malaysia raised a total of €169,000 toward Bosnia's flood relief fund.

On 17 July 2014, during the halftime break of the Europa League qualifying match between FK Sarajevo and Norwegian club Haugesund at the Olympic Stadium in Sarajevo, Tan presented pledges of assistance of €255,000 each to two hospitals in Doboj and Maglaj, to be used for medical equipment. He said in a pre-match interview: "Because of my involvement with Sarajevo Football Club, when I heard about the floods, I urged the Sun newspaper to run a campaign to raise donations to help Bosnia."

==== Kortrijk ====
Belgian football team KV Kortrijk was bought for five million euro by Vincent Tan on 12 May 2015. In 2019, Tan convinced the club to sign Malaysian teen sensation Luqman Hakim Shamsudin of Selangor on a five-year contract.

==== Los Angeles FC ====
In 2014, it was announced that Tan was part of a large ownership group involved with Major League Soccer club Los Angeles FC, who joined the league in 2018.

Reports from 2017 indicate that Tan is looking to sell Cardiff City, his stake in Major League Soccer’s Los Angeles FC and his professional teams in Bosnia and Belgium. In 2020, Tan sold his 20% stake in the club.

=== Horse racing ===
In April 2014, Tan (through one of his representatives) bought a two-year-old colt from Doncaster Bloodstock Breeze-Up Sales for £190,000. It will be trained by Australian Jeremy Gask in Wiltshire. Eamonn Wilmott, Gask's business partner, said: "We are very excited, and pleased to have Mr Tan involved. The horse looks exceptional and dominated the parade rings outside the sales."

== Philanthropy ==
Tan is the founder of the Better Malaysia Foundation, which provides interest-free loans and scholarships to students in need. In 2011, he was featured on Forbes Asia's list of Heroes of Philanthropy due to his pledge to donate half his fortune to social causes.

In 2017, Vincent Tan donated RM500,000 to Mercy Malaysia and Tzu Chi Malaysia, bringing the total sum of his donations to both organizations to RM7.6 million.

== Honours ==
=== Honours of Malaysia ===
- Malaysia
  - Commander of the Order of Loyalty to the Crown of Malaysia (PSM) – Tan Sri (1991)
- Kelantan
  - Grand Commander of the Order of the Life of the Crown of Kelantan (SJMK) – Dato' (2005)
- Pahang
  - Grand Companion of the Order of the Crown of Pahang (SIMP) – formerly Dato', now Dato' Indera (1989)
- Terengganu
  - Grand Commander of the Order of the Crown of Terengganu (SPMT) – Dato' Seri (1991)
  - Grand Companion of the Order of Sultan Mahmud I of Terengganu (SSMT) – Dato' Seri (1997)
