= Kenny Rogers Roasters =

Chicken-based restaurant chain

- The logo used since 2008
- Type: Restaurant chain
- Founded: 1991; 35 years ago
- Founders: Kenny Rogers; John Y. Brown Jr.
- Headquarters: United States
- Number of locations: 156 (worldwide)
- Area served: Malaysia, Philippines, Singapore, China, Indonesia, India, Brunei, United Arab Emirates (Dubai), Thailand (Phuket), Saudi Arabia (Riyadh)
- Owner: Berjaya Corporation
- Website: kennyrogersroasters.com (International) krr.com.my/v3/ (Malaysia) kennys.com.ph (Philippines) kennyrogersroasters.ae (UAE)

Kenny Rogers Roasters is a chain of chicken-based restaurants founded in 1991 by the late country musician Kenny Rogers and former KFC CEO John Y. Brown Jr., who was a former governor of the U.S. state of Kentucky. Brown had been an early investor in Kentucky Fried Chicken from 1964 to 1971. During his successful music career, Rogers had appeared in several commercials for the Dole Food Company before founding this restaurant chain.

The menu of Kenny Rogers Roasters originally featured wood-fired rotisserie chicken. After closing all of its U.S. operations and a series of ownership changes, Kenny Rogers Roasters operates principally in Asia as part of Malaysian conglomerate Berjaya Corporation. The Kenny Rogers Roasters brand is owned by Kenny Rogers Roasters International Corporation, a subsidiary of Roasters Asia Pacific (Cayman) Limited which itself is owned by Berjaya Corporation Berhad.

== History ==
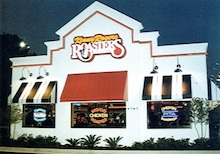
The first Kenny Rogers Roasters restaurant in Coral Springs, Florida

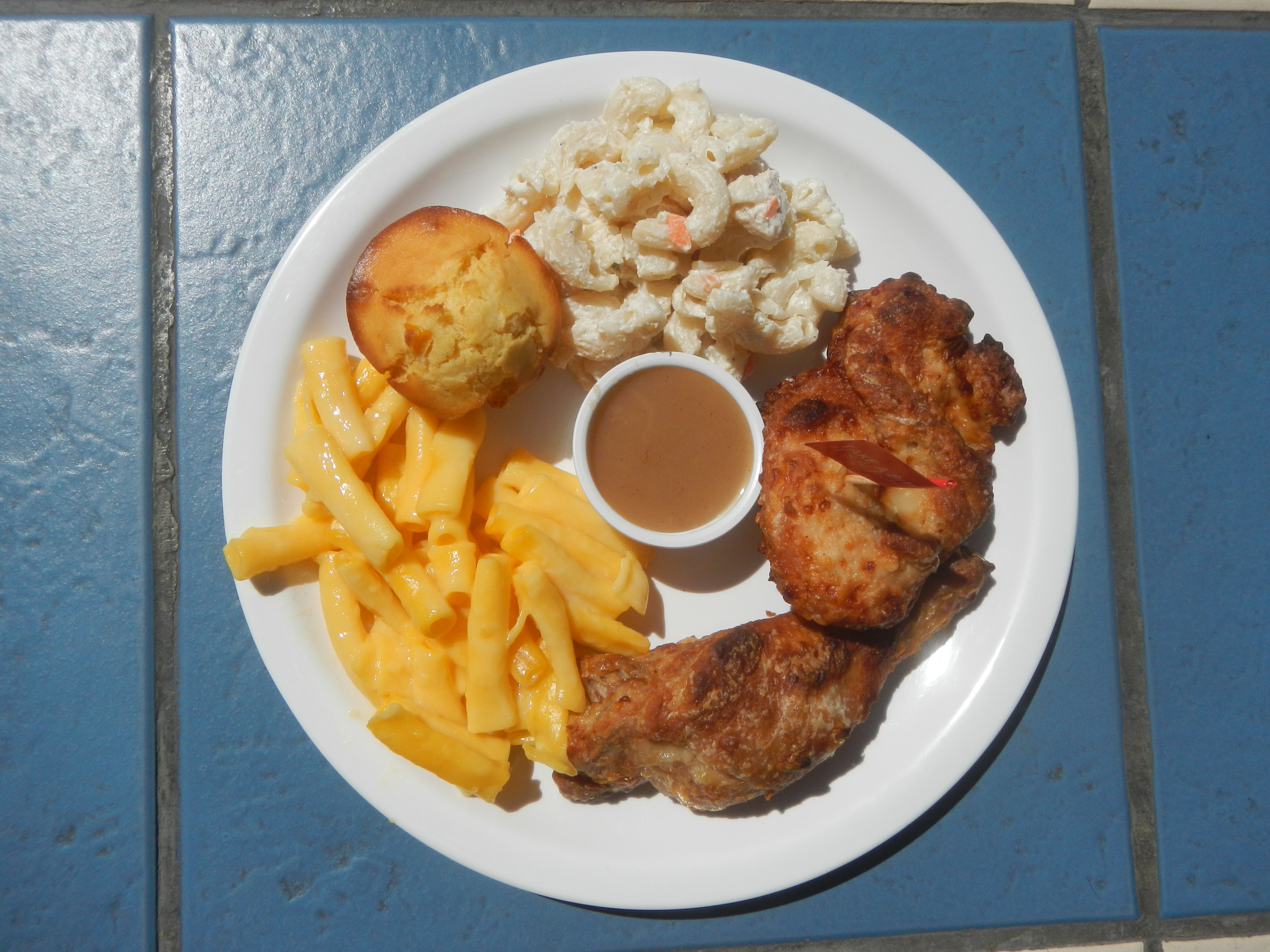
A typical Kenny Rogers's plate

John Y. Brown Jr., a business entrepreneur from the commonwealth of Kentucky had worked with the restaurant chains KFC and Lum's. After having served as governor of Kentucky from 1979 to 1983, Brown decided to return to the restaurant business. He chose to start a chicken restaurant in Coral Springs, Florida, in 1991, forming a partnership with country music singer Kenny Rogers who had previously released his own cook book. The first store opened in September 1991, and Rogers himself was present at the opening. Kenny Rogers Roasters was one of several restaurants to open in southern Florida that year, owing to the popularity of grilled chicken both in that particular market and nationwide.

By 1995, the menu had expanded to include turkey, ribs, and various side dishes. The chain eventually grew to over 350 restaurants, including locations in Canada, Europe, the Middle East and Asia.

Kenny Rogers Roasters found itself in competition with Boston Chicken (later Boston Market) and several smaller roasted chicken chains. Kentucky Fried Chicken also introduced a roasted chicken line of products called Rotisserie Gold to compete with Roasters and Boston Chicken. In December 1992, Clucker's, a minor player in the roasted chicken market, sued Kenny Rogers Roasters, claiming the chain had copied its recipes and menus. The lawsuit continued until Kenny Rogers Roasters purchased a majority stake in Cluckers in August 1994. Brown expanded the company to a chain of more than 425 restaurants before selling his interest in the franchise to the Malaysia-based Berjaya Group in 1996.

In 1994, two restaurants were opened in Athens, Greece. However, both were closed only a couple of years later.

In 1996, the chain announced plans to open in the United Kingdom and purchased locations in various cities. At this point, annual sales topped $300 million. However, the planned restaurants in Britain never materialized.

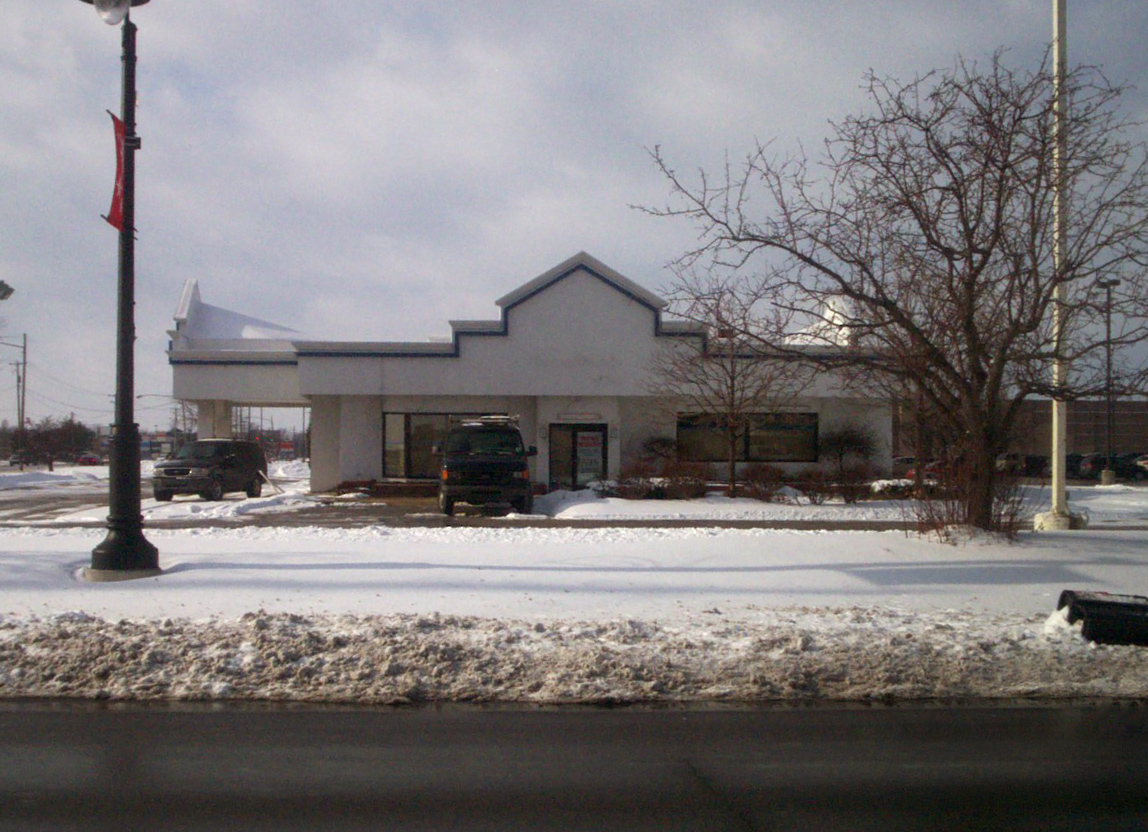
A former Kenny Rogers Roasters in Saginaw, Michigan

The company entered Chapter 11 bankruptcy in March 1998 and was bought by Nathan's Famous, Inc. for $1.25 million (US$2 million in more recent terms) on April 1, 1999; as a result of restructuring, many locations closed. Rotisserie-roasted chicken had become commonplace in many food supermarkets. By 2000, the chain was down to 90 franchised restaurants, 40 of those in the U.S.

Nathan's Famous divested itself of Kenny Rogers Roasters in 2008, selling it to their Asian franchisee, Roasters Asia Pacific (Cayman) Limited, a company which is owned by Berjaya Group of Malaysia. The last Kenny Rogers Roasters operating in North America was located in the Ontario Mills mall in Ontario, California and closed on December 31, 2011.

The 2008 purchase agreement allowed for Nathan's Famous and Miami Subs to continue selling Kenny Rogers Roasters items in their restaurants. Nathan's continues to serve Kenny Rogers Roasters items in selected locations, such as its flagship location on Coney Island. Miami Subs (since sold off by Nathan's) no longer has a "Kenny Rogers" section on their menu.

Despite the chain's end in the United States, Kenny Rogers Roasters continues to flourish in Asia under the ownership of Berjaya Group. An article published by Time.com in 2011 reported that Kenny Rogers Roasters had grown to almost 140 restaurants across Asia, with continued expansion in Malaysia, the Philippines, and more recently southern China.

In Malaysia, the Kenny Rogers Roasters chain of restaurants is developed and operated by Berjaya Roasters (M) Sdn Bhd. Under a corporate exercise by Berjaya Corporation Berhad in 2011, Berjaya Roasters (M) Sdn Bhd became a wholly owned subsidiary of Berjaya Food Berhad.

In March 2011, Berjaya Food Berhad listed on the Main Board of Bursa Malaysia. Effectively, Berjaya Food Berhad is responsible for establishing, operating, and expanding Kenny Rogers Roasters restaurants in Malaysia. This includes developing the Kenny Rogers Roasters brand, managing menu items, and acting as a central procurement agent for Kenny Rogers Roasters restaurants across Malaysia.

== Restaurant concept and menu ==
As a brand, Kenny Rogers Roasters advocates healthy eating as reflected in its brand tag line "less fat...less salt...less calories".

== Number of restaurants and countries of operation ==
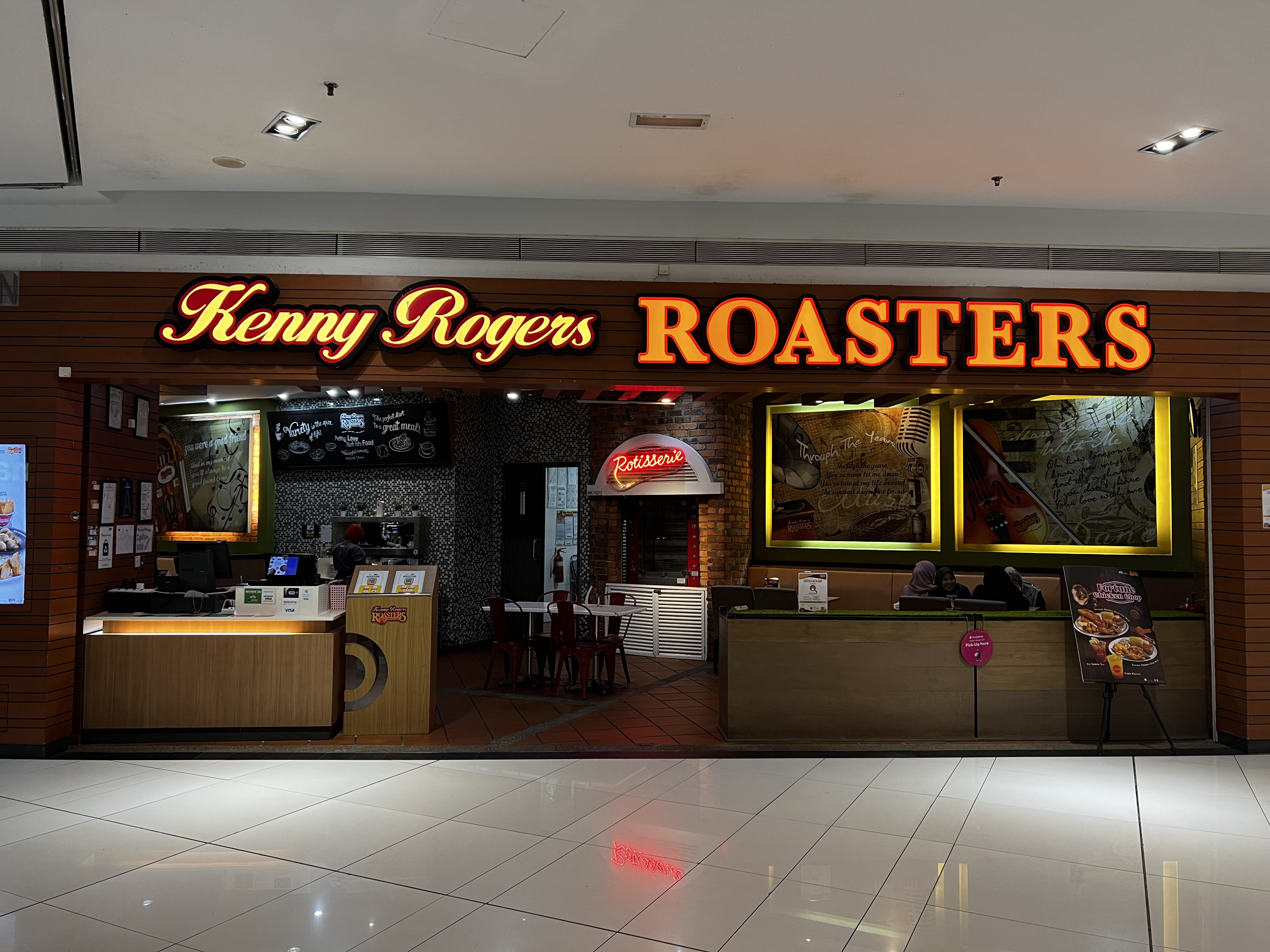
Kenny Rogers Roasters, NU Sentral, Kuala Lumpur, Malaysia

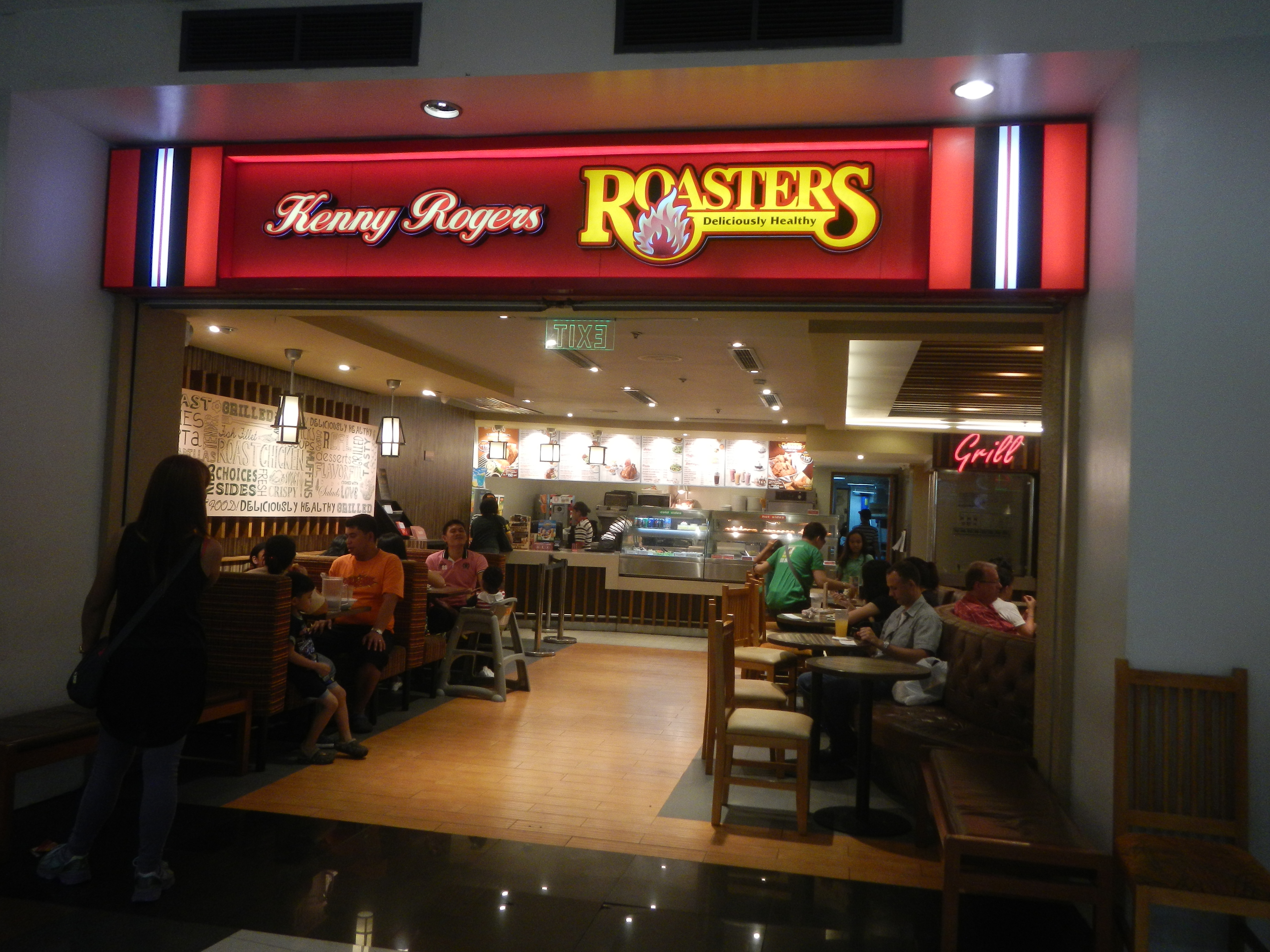
Kenny Rogers Roasters, Robinsons Place Manila, Manila, Philippines

In its 2012 Annual Report, Berjaya Corporation Berhad reported that as of April 30, 2012, Kenny Rogers Roasters restaurants numbered 74 in Malaysia and 8 in Indonesia. It was also mentioned that Roasters Asia Pacific (Hong Kong) Limited has operations in other countries including the United States, Malaysia, Singapore, Indonesia, China, and the Philippines.

In addition, Roasters Asia Pacific has been undergoing expansion in other international territories including India and the Middle East. Kenny Rogers Roasters opened its first outlet in Brunei in January 2013. The second Brunei outlet was opened at Tanjung Bunut in June 2015.

In December 2016, the first KRR opened in Thailand in the Laguna area of Phuket. There are currently plans to open other restaurants within Phuket and then into other parts of Thailand as well.

In February 2023, Kenny Rogers Roasters opened its first flagship restaurant in Dubai, United Arab Emirates in the Salah Al Din locality. In mid-2023, Kenny Rogers Roasters expanded to Deira City Centre.

As of October 2026, Kenny Rogers Roasters has 163 branches in the Philippines and 25 in Malaysia.

== In popular culture ==
Kenny Rogers Roasters is the center of the episode of Seinfeld, "The Chicken Roaster". After a branch opens in the neighborhood, Kramer cannot sleep due to its neon sign shining through his window, so he hangs up a banner to drive it out of business. The branch shuts down at the end of the episode when Jerry unintentionally sabotages it with a soaked rat hat. The story was inspired by a real-life confrontation between a New York City branch of Kenny Rogers Roasters and a neighboring law office.

In the Archer episode Bloody Ferlin, Cheryl thinks a rooster is a hen. When Ray corrects her and says it's a rooster, she exclaims "Duh, Kenny Rogers Roosters".

== See also ==
- List of fast-food chicken restaurants
