= Berjaya Corporation =

Malaysian company

Berjaya Corporation Berhad
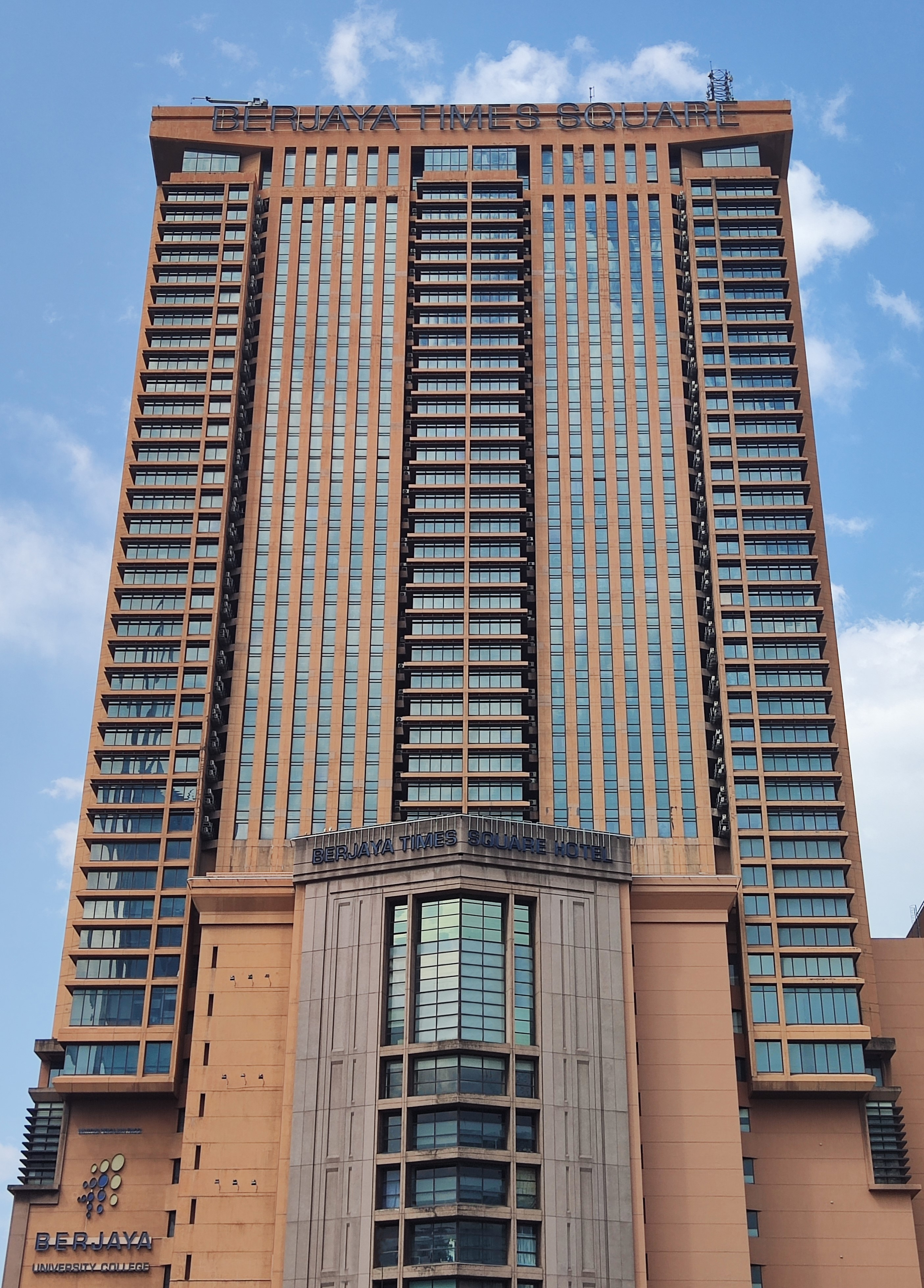
- Berjaya Times Square in Kuala Lumpur, Malaysia
- Formerly: Berjaya Group Berhad
- Type: Public limited company
- Traded as: MYX: 3395
- ISIN: MYL3395OO000
- Industry: Conglomerate
- Founded: 1984; 42 years ago
- Founder: Vincent Tan
- Headquarters: Level 12(East Wing), Berjaya Times Square, Kuala Lumpur, Malaysia
- Area served: Southeast Asia
- Key people: Vincent Tan (Founder & Advisor); Nerine Tan (co-CEO); Vivienne Cheng (co-CEO)
- Services: Consumer marketing, property development and investment, hotels and resorts and recreation development, gaming and lottery management, food and beverage, environmental services and clean technology, motor trading and distribution, telecommunications and information technology-related services and products
- Revenue: ▲RM 9.61 billion(2023); RM 8.16 billion(2022)
- Net income: ▼RM 19.1 million (2023); RM 23.5 million(2022)
- Total assets: ▲RM 22.2 billion(2023); RM 20.5 billion(2022)
- Total equity: RM 8.85 billion(2023); RM 8.88 billion(2022)
- Number of employees: 16,000
- Subsidiaries: Berjaya Land; Sports Toto; Berjaya Food; REDtone Digital Berhad; Berjaya Assets; 7-Eleven Malaysia Holdings Berhad
- Website: berjaya.com

Berjaya Corporation Berhad (MYX: 3395; formerly known as Berjaya Group Berhad, Inter-Pacific Industrial Group Berhad and Raleigh Berhad) is a Malaysian-based corporation which controls a wide array of businesses, including consumer marketing, property development and investment, as well as hotels, resorts and recreation development. It also specialises in gaming and lottery management, food and beverage, motor trading and distribution, investment on environmental services and clean technology, and telecommunication and information technology-related services and products.

The corporation is founded by local business magnate Vincent Tan.

== History ==
Berjaya was previously known as Berjaya Kawat Berhad founded by Broken Hill Proprietary Ltd, Australia and National Iron & Steel Mills, Singapore. In 1984, Vincent Tan took a stake in Berjaya Industrial Berhad. In 1985, Tan bought 51% of Sports Toto from the Malaysian government. He then injected Sports Toto into Berjaya, swapping his shares in Sports Toto for a controlling stake in Berjaya. The shareholding change also resulted in a major change in the business, direction and the dynamic growth of a diversified conglomerate under the flagship of Berjaya Corporation Berhad.

In 1988, Tan swapped his shares in Berjaya for control of Raleigh Bhd. (originally a bicycle manufacturer incorporated in 1967 and gained official listing on Bursa Malaysia in 1969), which was then renamed Inter-Pacific and turned into Berjaya's holding company. It later became known as Reka Pacific Berhad. Under his leadership, Berjaya's pretax profit rose from RM 700,000 in 1984 to RM 70 million in 1989, and RM 342 million in 1998, and exceeding RM 1 billion in some years in the next two decades.

Berjaya Corporation Berhad assumed the listing status of Berjaya Group Berhad on the Main Board of Bursa Securities upon the completion of the group restructuring exercise in 2005 and the listing of new shares the year after.

Below are the listed subsidiaries under Berjaya Corporation Berhad:

- Berjaya Land Berhad
- Sports Toto Berhad
- Berjaya Food Berhad
- REDtone Digital Berhad (formerly known as REDtone International Berhad)
- Berjaya Philippines Inc.
- Bermaz Auto BerhadOther assets include:

== Corporate social responsibility ==
The Better Malaysia Foundation (BMF) is a subsidiary of the corporate social responsibility program developed by Berjaya. The Chairman of Berjaya, Vincent Tan is also the chairman of BMF.

In 2013, in partnership with SOLS 24/7, BMF launched Project 100 aimed at establishing 100 community centres where Malaysians would be able to have access to free education.

In 2016, the foundation donated RM1 million to over 39 charities including a RM 50,000 donation to the Generasiku Sayang Negri Selangor organisation, and the Malaysian Sikh Union, which received RM35,000. Tan also donated RM 25.6 million to the BMF via the Berjaya CSR program, earmarked for education and skills training, as well as community-based projects.

In 2017, the BMF donated RM500,000 to victims of the Penang flood.

Each year, the foundation presents the Better Malaysia Foundation Personality of the Year Award. Past winners include Madenjit Singh, founder of Science of Life Studies 24/7 in 2012, Jane Goodall in 2014, and Dharma Master Cheng Yen for humanitarian work in Malaysia through the Tzu Chi Foundation.

Berjaya's official charitable arm is Berjaya Cares Foundation, which focuses in empowering individuals and communities in many differing aspects.

Some of the critics include the Berjaya Hospitality Industry, which owns renowned brands like Berjaya Hotels, Jollibean and Joybean, is under scrutiny for alleged practices compromising animal welfare and food safety. Leading this charge is UK-based Equitas, launching a campaign to inform Berjaya customers of these concerns. Of particular concern is Berjaya's continued use of battery cage eggs, a practice criticized worldwide for its cruelty and food safety risks including in the Directive 1999/74/EC, as hens endure deplorable conditions, feces accumulate near the eggs, and deceased hens often decompose near those still laying eggs for human consumption. Amid a global shift towards more humane practices in the hospitality industry, Berjaya faces increasing pressure to adopt a timeline for exclusively using cage-free eggs in all its operations.

== See also ==
- Vincent Tan
