= Sports Toto =

Malaysian gambling company

STM Lottery Sdn Bhd
- Formerly: Sports Toto Malaysia Sdn Bhd
- Traded as: MYX: 1562
- ISIN: MYL1562OO007
- Industry: Gambling
- Founded: 1969; 57 years ago
- Headquarters: Berjaya Times Square, Kuala Lumpur, Malaysia
- Key people: Vincent Tan
- Products: Toto 4D; Toto 4D Fireball; Toto 4D Jackpot; Toto 4D Zodiac; Toto 5D; Toto 6D; Star Toto 6/50; Power Toto 6/55; Supreme Toto 6/58
- Parent: Berjaya Group
- Website: www.sportstoto.com.my

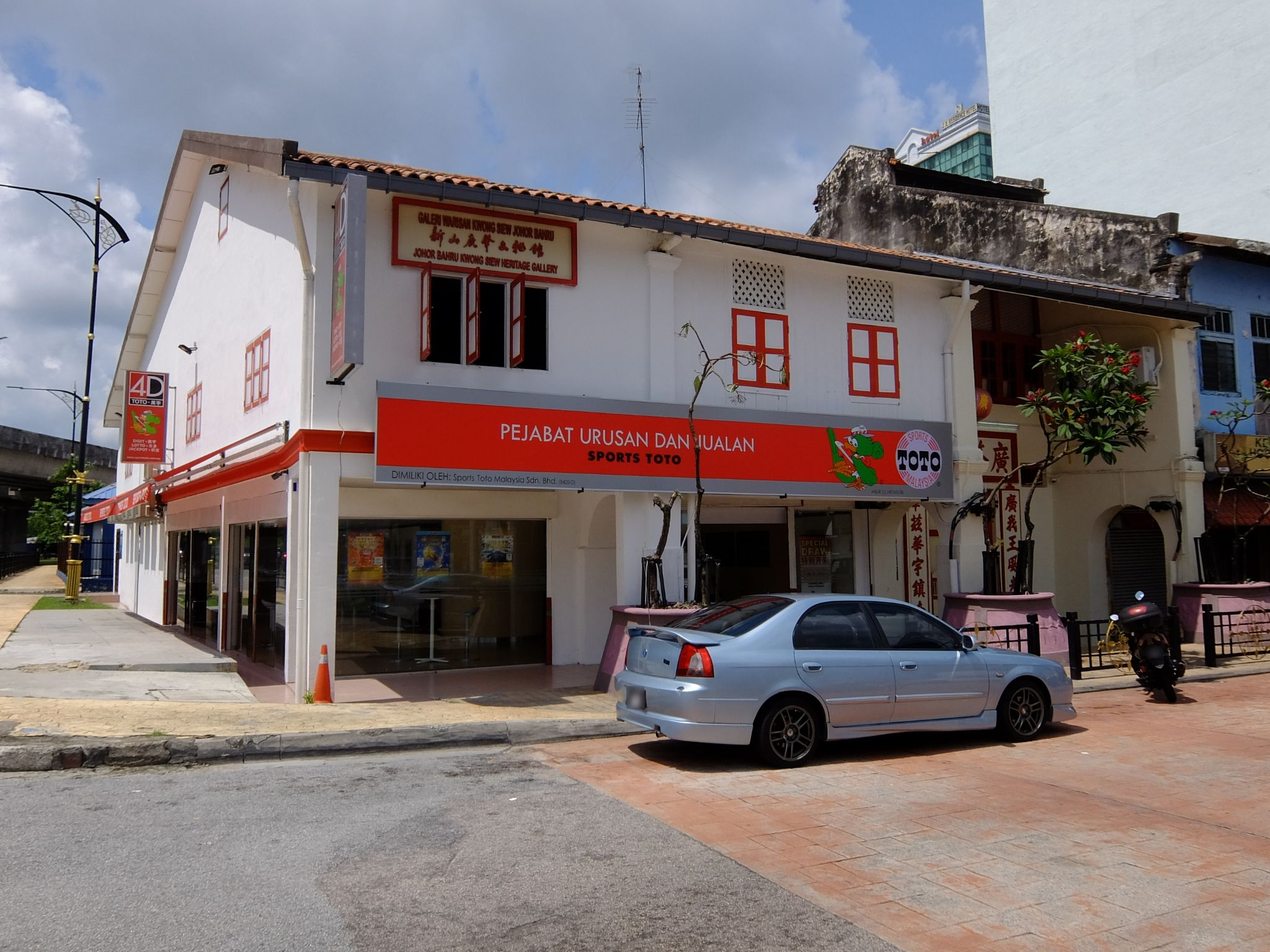
Sports Toto outlet in Johor Bahru, Johor.

STM Lottery Sdn Bhd (a.k.a. Sports Toto), formerly known as Sports Toto Malaysia Sdn Bhd, is a Malaysian company, which operates in the gambling sector.

Founded and incorporated by the Malaysian Government in 1969, it focused on the commercialisation of 4-Digits–based games. On 1 August 1985, the government in a non-tender privatisation, sold the company to local businessman Vincent Tan who merged it into Berjaya Corporation. It is one of three licensed number forecast operators in Malaysia, with the others being Magnum and Da Ma Cai.

Today, Sports Toto is a wholly owned subsidiary of Sports Toto Berhad (MYX: 1562), which is listed on the main market of Bursa Malaysia. It claims to be the largest operator in Malaysia of 4D-based games, with 680 sales outlets offering a total of 7 games.

Sports Toto boast the largest jackpot recorded to date in Malaysia, amounting to RM121.7 million in prize money which was won by multiple lucky winners on 18 January 2025.
