= Rabbit hair =

Fur from rabbit

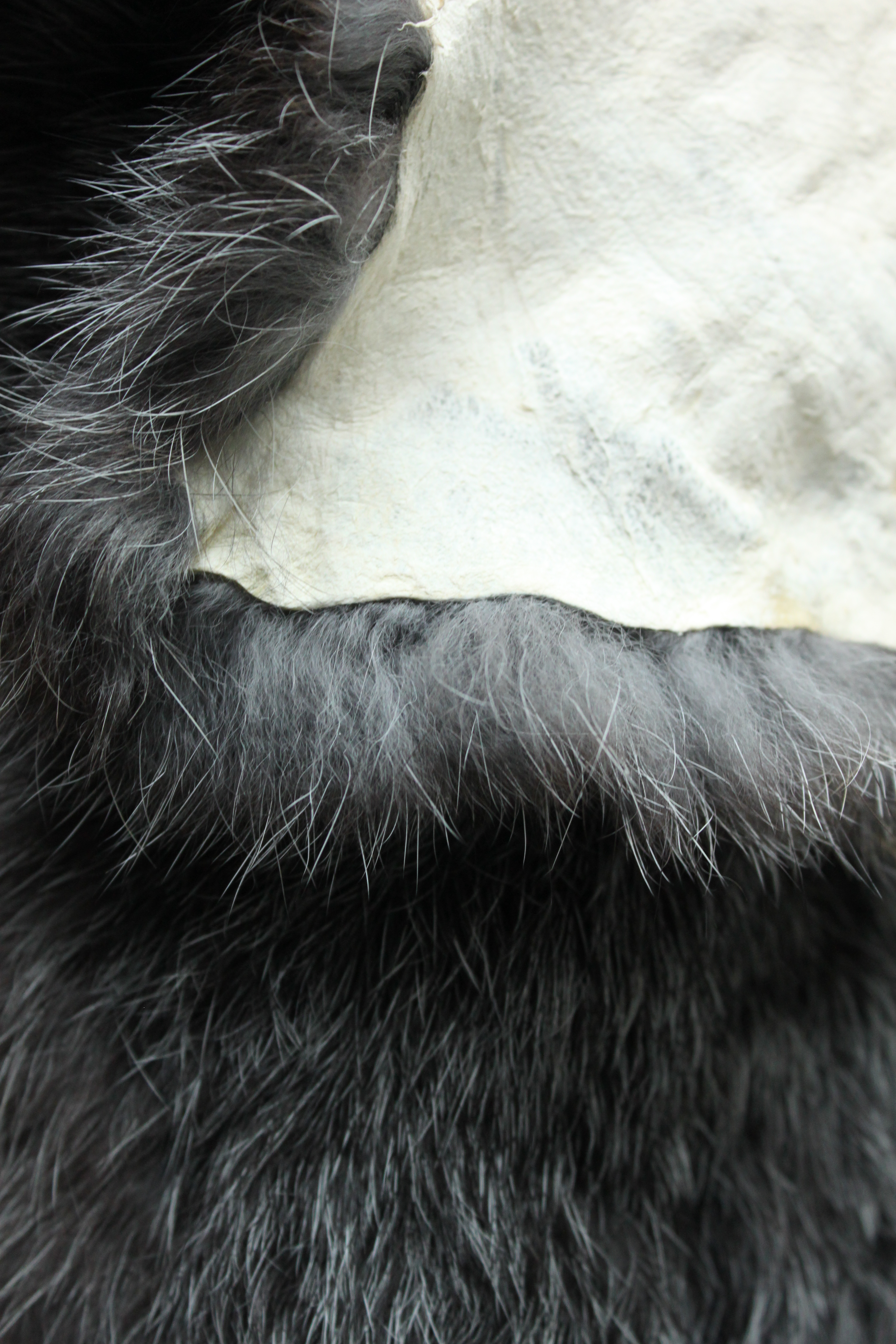
Rabbit fur clearly showing the different hairs

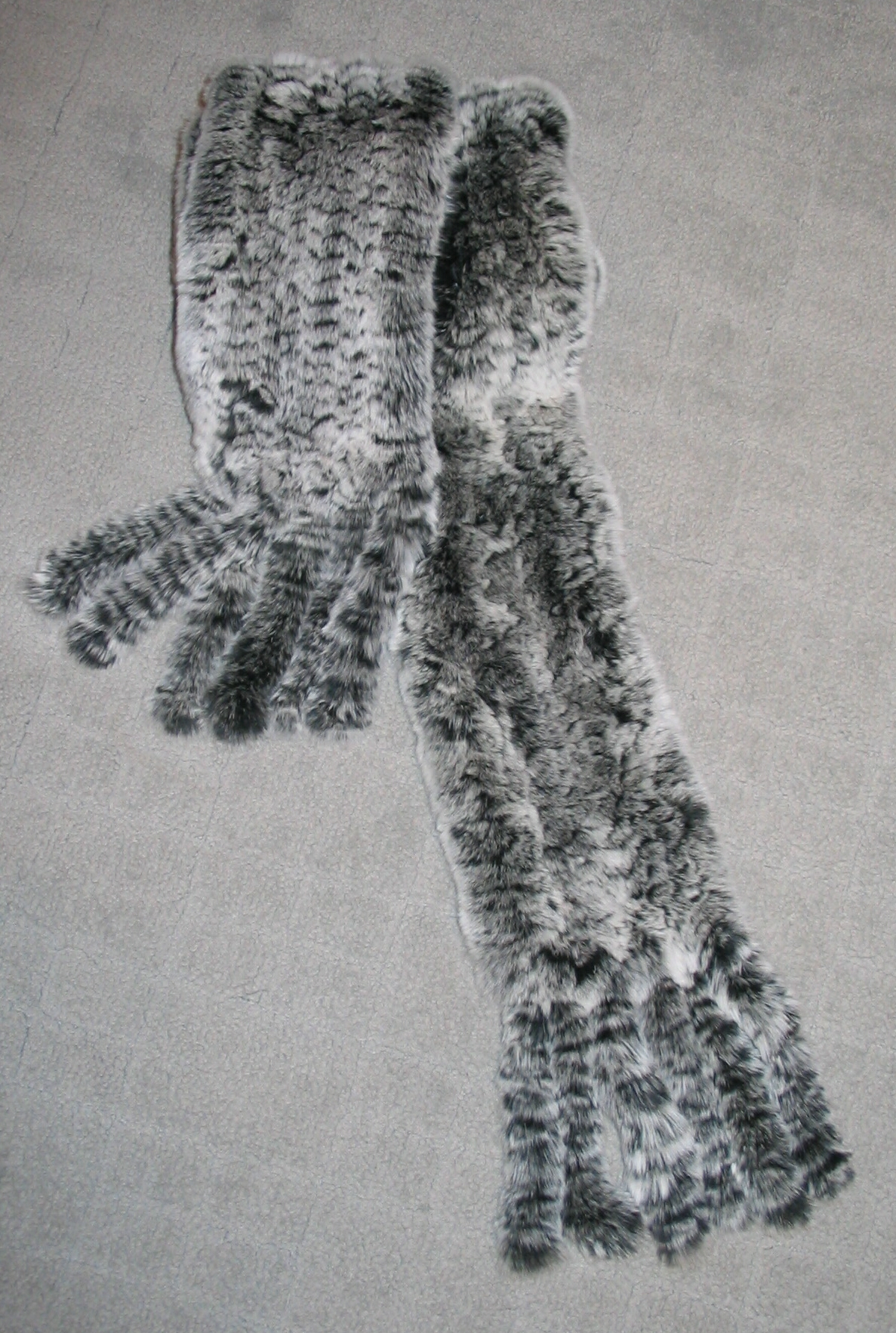
Fur stole made of Rex rabbit

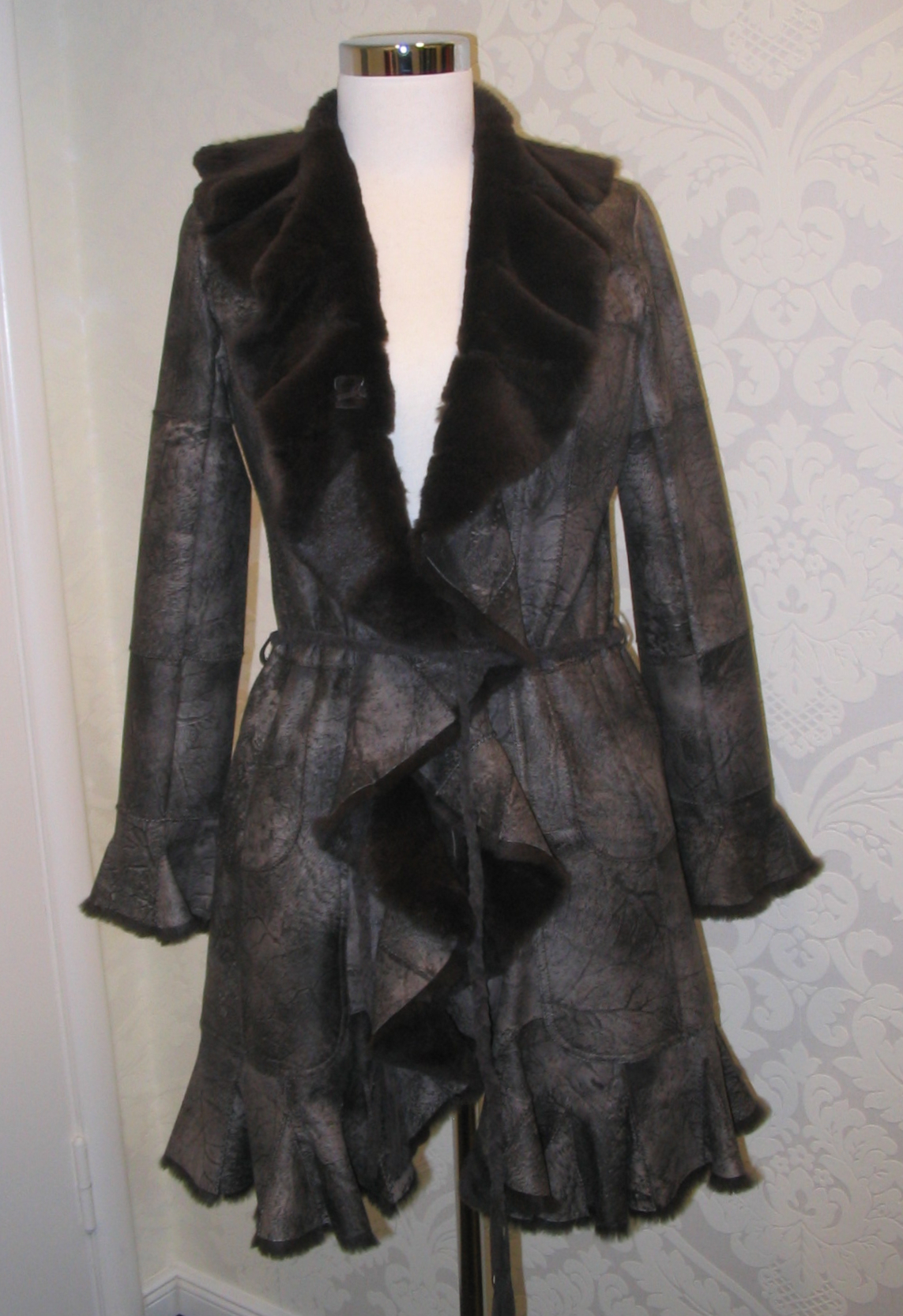
Jens Asendorf rabbit fur coat

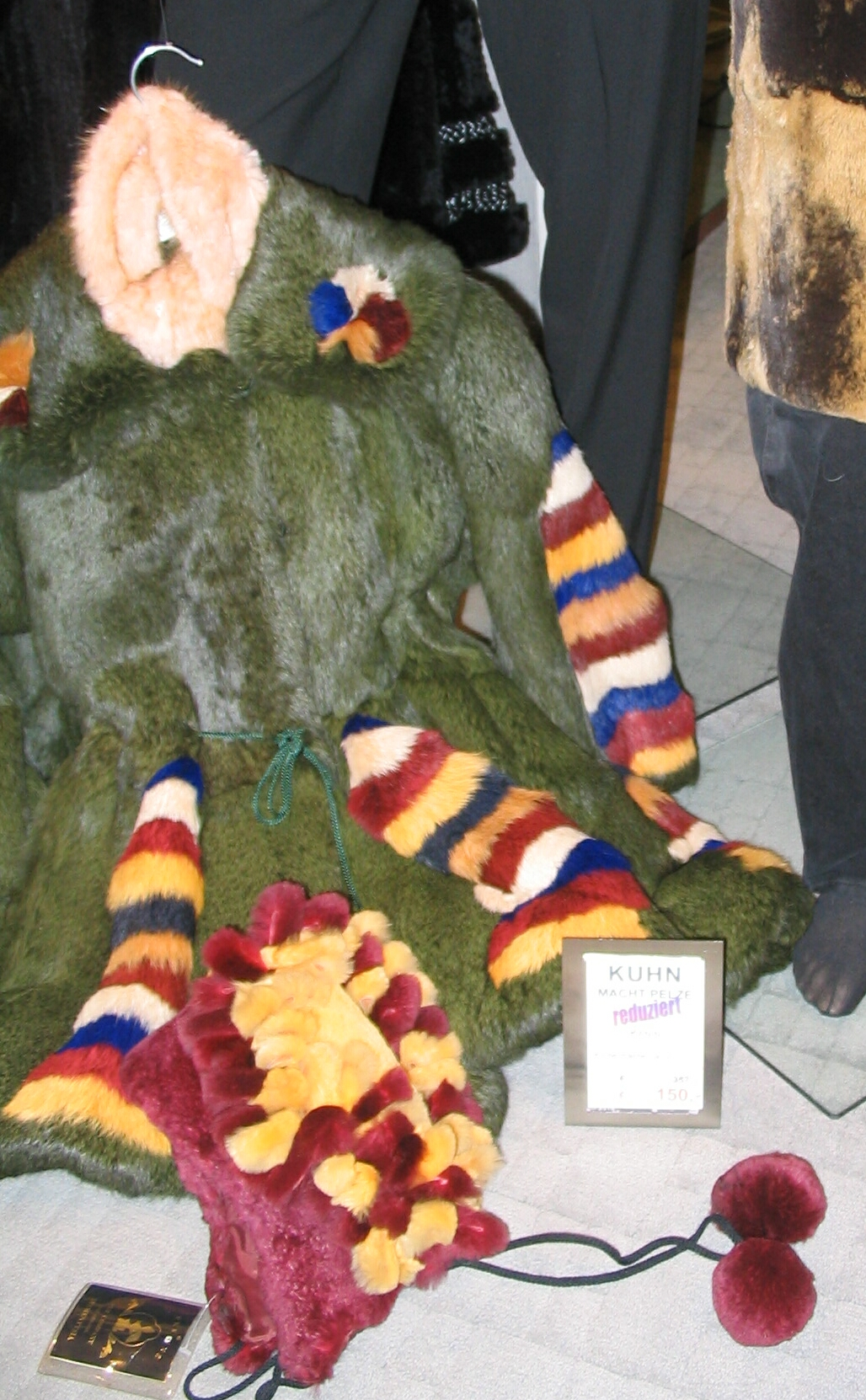
A child's multicoloured rabbit coat and cap – rabbit became popular because it could be dyed to create different effects or sheared to imitate other animal furs

Rabbit hair (also called rabbit fur, cony, coney, comb or lapin) is the fur of the common rabbit. It is most commonly used in the making of fur hats and coats, and is considered quite valuable today, although it was once a lower-priced commodity in the fur trade.

== Types of rabbit fur ==
The hair of a rabbit can be divided into three types: "longer, rectrix guard hairs, stiff at the base; the more numerous tectrix barbed hairs forming the magor part of the coat, which share a hair follicle with the third type-the shorter hairs making up the undercoat." Colloquially, these types are called

- guide hairs: external hairs, long and rough
- guard hairs (also called "barbes"): four guard hairs surround each guide hair, sealing the coat
- down: make up 90–95% of rabbit hair; they are very short and barely visible, and serve to insulate the rabbit.

A selectively bred rabbit from the 1900s, the Rex rabbit, has guard hairs of the same length as the down, but this is an atypical recessive trait that is relatively rare in wild rabbits.

Rabbit hair is commonly considered a byproduct of the ordinary process of breeding rabbits for meat, and as such is manufactured in vast quantities in England and France; more than seventy million pelts a year in France alone. However, the quality of fur from these rabbits tends to be low, as the rabbits are slaughtered before reaching twelve weeks old and still have the infant coat. The lower quality hair is sometimes used for felt.

In temperate climates, the highest quality furs are obtained in winter from rabbits over five months old, when the thickness of the fur is even; at other times of year, varying degrees of hair shedding causes uneven patches in the fur. The coat is also at its thickest at this time of year. The highest quality pelts are suitable for clothing, and typically constitute less than half of all pelts collected. The hair of the Angora rabbit is plucked or shaved and used as fiber, rather than as pelts.

Rabbit fur products have a tendency to shed more easily than some other furs and might not have the same longevity.

== Use in the fur trade ==
The use of rabbit pelts in the commercial fur trade took off in the 1920s, when it was incorporated into everything from hats to stoles, coats and baby blankets. By 1924, it accounted for half the US fur trade. While it was considerably cheaper than furs from other animals, it had softness and density and could also be dyed, plucked or shorn to look like other furs – shearing was also known as blocking.

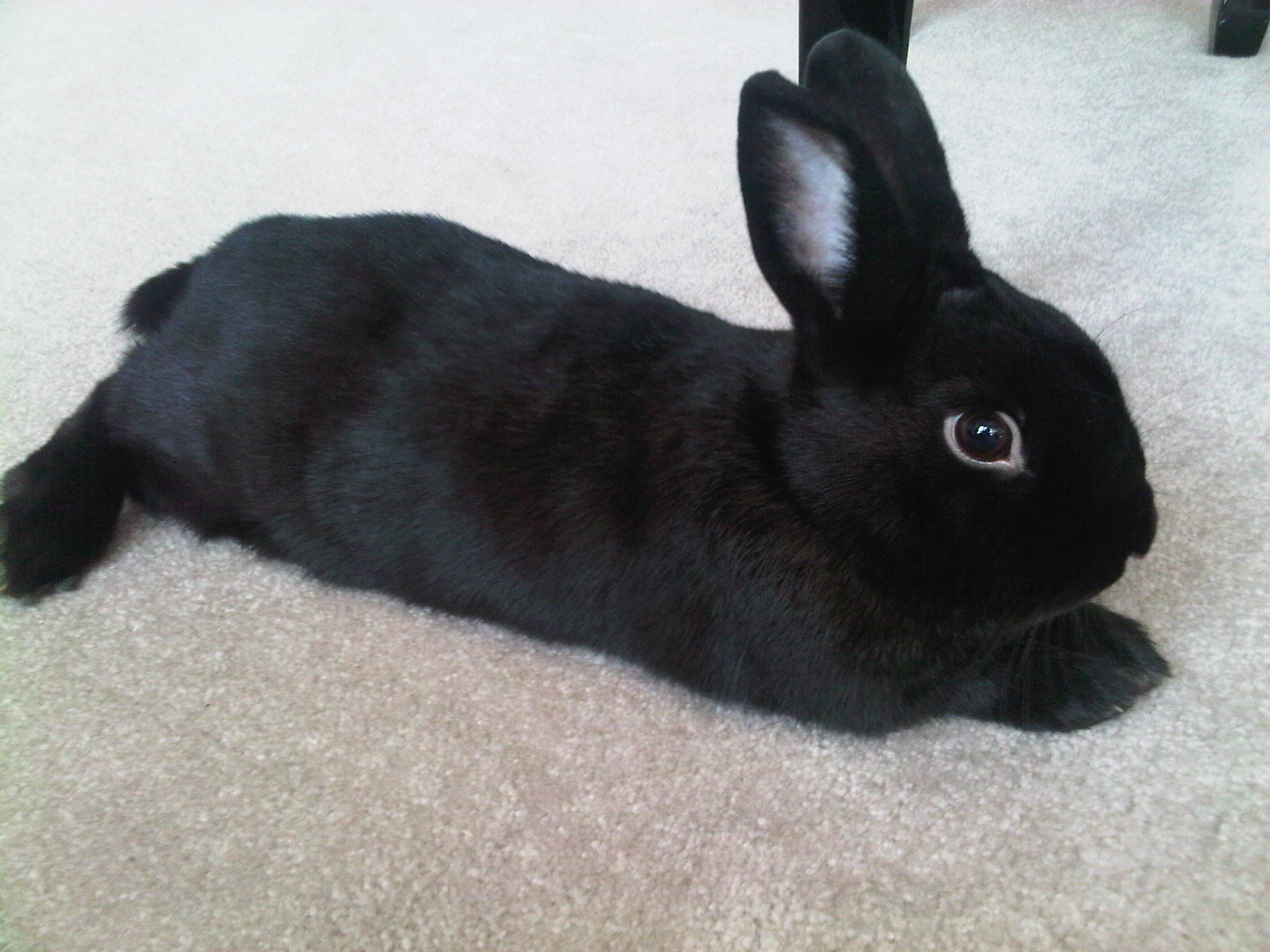
Havana rabbits were among the highly prized breeds because their fur could be used in an undyed state

White pelts commanded a premium since they could be most easily dyed and in their natural state bore a close resemblance to much pricer ermine (stoat). New Zealand white rabbit (actually bred in the US) was highly prized, but other rabbit varieties in different hues – including Havana, Lilac and Checkered Giant were also valuable because they could be used in their natural colouring. One commentator noted in the 1920s: "[W]here one sealskin coat graced Milady of Fifth Avenue in 1900, a hundred thousand coats of rabbit-seal are turned out on Sixth Avenue during the fur season for the Misses of Main Street all over America".

Names developed such as minkony, ermiline and northern seal – all of which were rabbit fur. After 1938, American fur coats had to be labelled using the name of the animal used in its making – for instance 'seal dyed coney' or 'beaver dyed rabbit' – in order to avoid confusion among consumers.

=== List of former names for rabbit hair coats ===
- Australian seal: Australian rabbit shorn and dyed to replicate natural seal fur. See also sealine.
- Baltic black fox or Baltic brown fox or Baltic white fox: Rabbit dyed in a variety of hues to resemble fox fur. White fox was undyed fur from white rabbit or hare. See also Baltic lion/red fox.
- Baltic leopard: Australian rabbit dyed and marked to resemble the distinctive spots of a leopard skin coat.
- Baltic lion or Baltic red fox: Australian rabbit in its natural hue of either (respectively) yellow or reddish tones.
- Baltic tiger: Australian rabbit dyed to resemble the markings of tiger skin.
- Beaver dyed coney or French beaver or beaverette or Belgian beaver: Dyed and with the tips sheared in order to resemble the short dark-brown coat of natural beaver fur. Note that Hudson seal was muskrat
- Bluerette: Rabbit dyed blue.
- Castorette: Rabbit dyed to replicate beaver.
- Chinchillette: Rabbit dyed to resemble a chinchilla (not the variety of rabbit), with characteristic graduated markings. Note that chapchillas and French chinchilla were made of dyed hare.
- Cony leopard or cony mole: Sheared and dyed rabbit. Cony often designated rabbits from Europe.
- Electric: Denoted a trade name for a variety of rabbit furs designed to replicate other animals, for instance electric beaver, mole or seal.
- Ermilette or ermilene or imitation ermine: White rabbit fur, sometimes painted with spots to look like ermine. Ermine was a traditional trimming, used on stoles and for robes of state, although rabbit versions of ermine became more widely used.
- French cony: White rabbit that had been shorn.
- French sable: Rabbit dyed to imitate more expensive sable.
- Lapin: Shorn and dyed rabbit – this may be in a variety of colours.
- Mendoza beaver dyed coney or Mendoza beaver: A trade name of the Mendoza Fur Dyeing Works see beaver dyed coney.
- Meskin: Denoted a trade name for a variety of rabbit furs designed to replicate other animals, for instance meskin seal or ermine. A variety replicating mole was known as Meskin moline.
- Minkony: Rabbit dyed and treated to resemble mink, a fur available in a wide variety of colours from white to near black.
- Molin or Moline or cony mole: Rabbit designed to resemble mole fur. See also Meskin moline.
- Muskratine: Shorn and dyed rabbit resembling seal.
- Nutriette: Shorn and dyed to resemble a Nutria fur.
- Sealine or Arctic seal or Australian seal or Roman seal or northern seal or seal dyed coney or Baltic seal or bay seal or coast seal or near seal or sealette: Sheared and dyed to replicate the brown, grey or black fur of harp or northern seal.
- Squirrelette: Dyed to resemble a squirrel fur – typically the blue/grey Siberian squirrel.

== See also ==
- Angora wool
- List of types of fur
