= Eamonn Wilmott =

British entrepreneur (born 1961)

Eamonn Wilmott is a British entrepreneur.

== Early life and education ==
Wilmott was born in 1961. He was educated at John Hampden Grammar School in High Wycombe.

== Career ==
In the mid 90s he founded Online Magic, with Andy Hobsbawm. The company later became part of the Agency.com network.

- In 2008 Wilmott set up 'Horses First Racing' with Australian trainer Jeremy Gask.
- July 2010 Wilmott was appointed chairman of the Board of Thoroughbred Owner and Breeder Magazine and served for 5 years.
- November 2012 Wilmott co-founded Total Performance Data Ltd with Will Duff Gordon.
- In March 2013, Wilmott was appointed to the Board of Mark Allen Group.
- In December 2014, Wilmott was appointed to the Board of the British Horseracing Authority.
- In 2018, Wilmott was appointed chairman of the Alizeti Group.
