= Nutria fur =

Type of fur

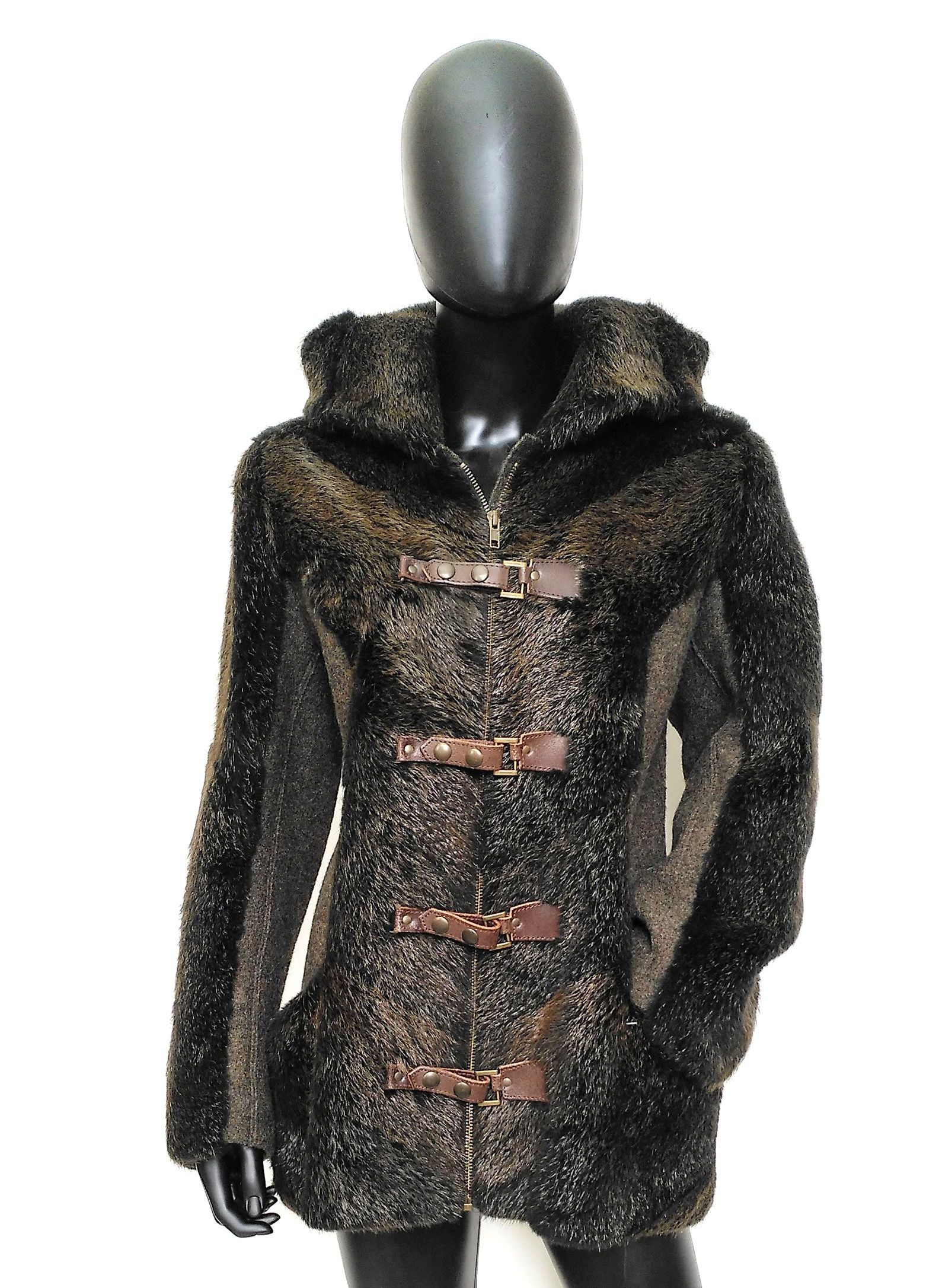
Nutria with milled wool (2021)

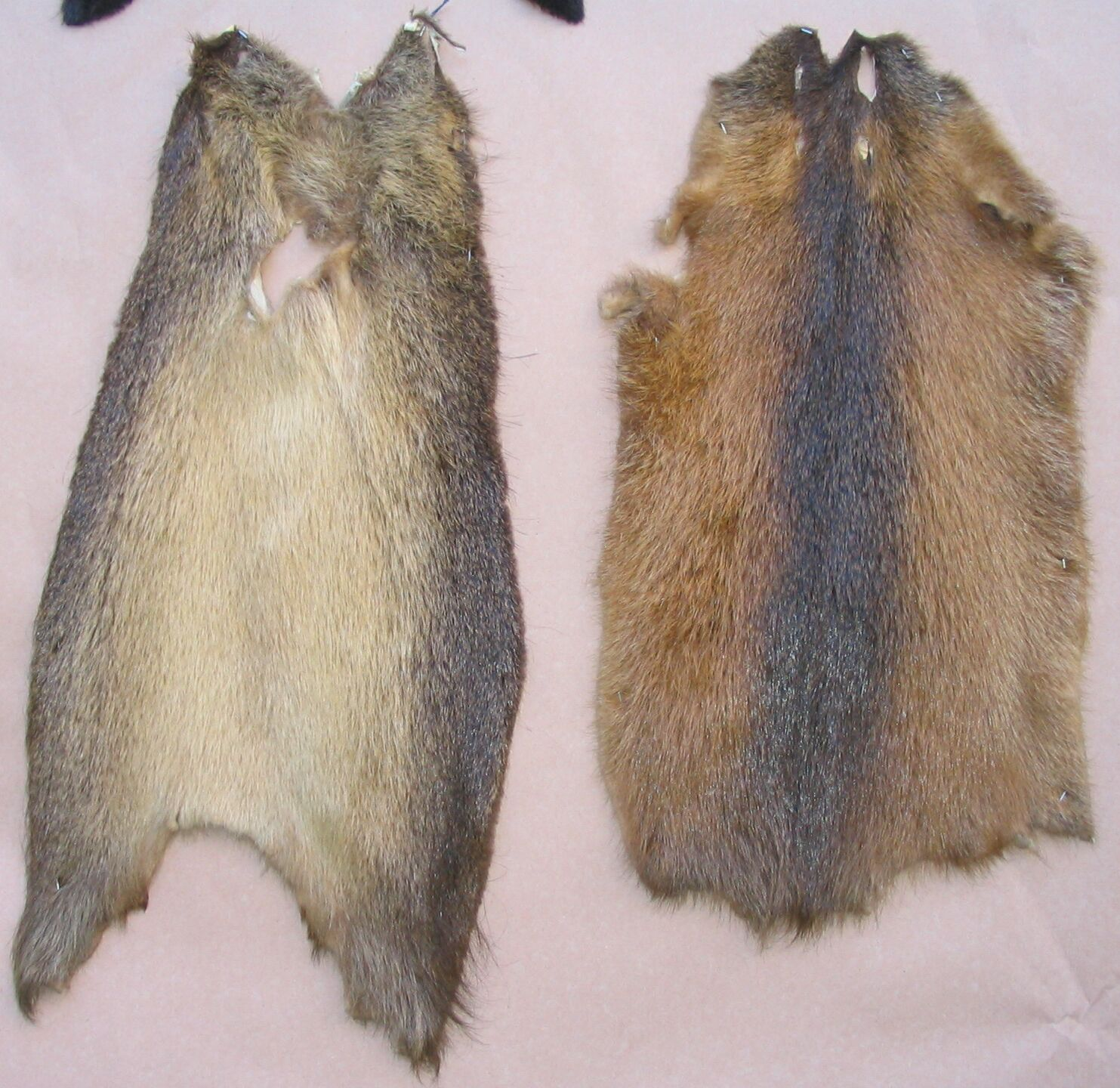
Nutria, natural coloration. Cut open along the back (left), along the belly part (right).

Nutria fur is a type of fur obtained from the nutria, which is also known as the coypu, beaver rat or swamp beaver. The native habitat of the nutria is South America, but the animal was released into the wild for fur production in the first half of the 20th century and is now also found in Germany and large parts of Europe, Asia and North America.

As a rule, nutria furs are plucked and/or sheared (without the bristly guard hair).

== Fur ==
The fur length is about 43 to 63 cm (17 to 25 in), the barely hairy tail is 30 to 45 cm long (12 to 18 in). The hair color of the wild nutria is dark brown, occasionally grayish or reddish brown; the long, coarse tips of the guard hairs are often yellowish. The undercoat is dark gray-brown to black-brown, bluish-black. In contrast to almost all other fur animals, the quality of the nutria fur is better on the belly part than on the back, and the mammary glands are also located on the sides of the back, again in contrast to other fur animals. The middle of the fur is only slightly darker than the sides compared to other fur types. In some parts of the dewlap and belly area, an ombré-like brightening is noticeable, which can go as far as light gray-whitish between the ears, for example.

In order to better showcase the fuller belly area after processing, the round-skinned pelt was usually cut open along the back.

=== Pelt structure ===
A distinction is made between 3 types of guard hairs; for every 10 mm² there is 1 leading hair (larger one), 3 guard hairs that gradually taper into their shaft, and 19 guard hairs with sharply defined tips. The guard hair is 1.5 to 3.3 cm long on the back (according to Franke/Kroll up to 8 cm!) and 2.5 to 3.3 cm long on the belly. The undercoat is particularly dense on the sides of the pelt and is 12 to 15 mm long. The 15 to 18 mm long wool hairs on the back only reach a density of 40% of the belly side. On average, there are 150 hairs per cm². Similar to the beaver, the guard hairs on the back of the nutria fur are not regularly distributed, but are usually grouped together in tufts or clusters.

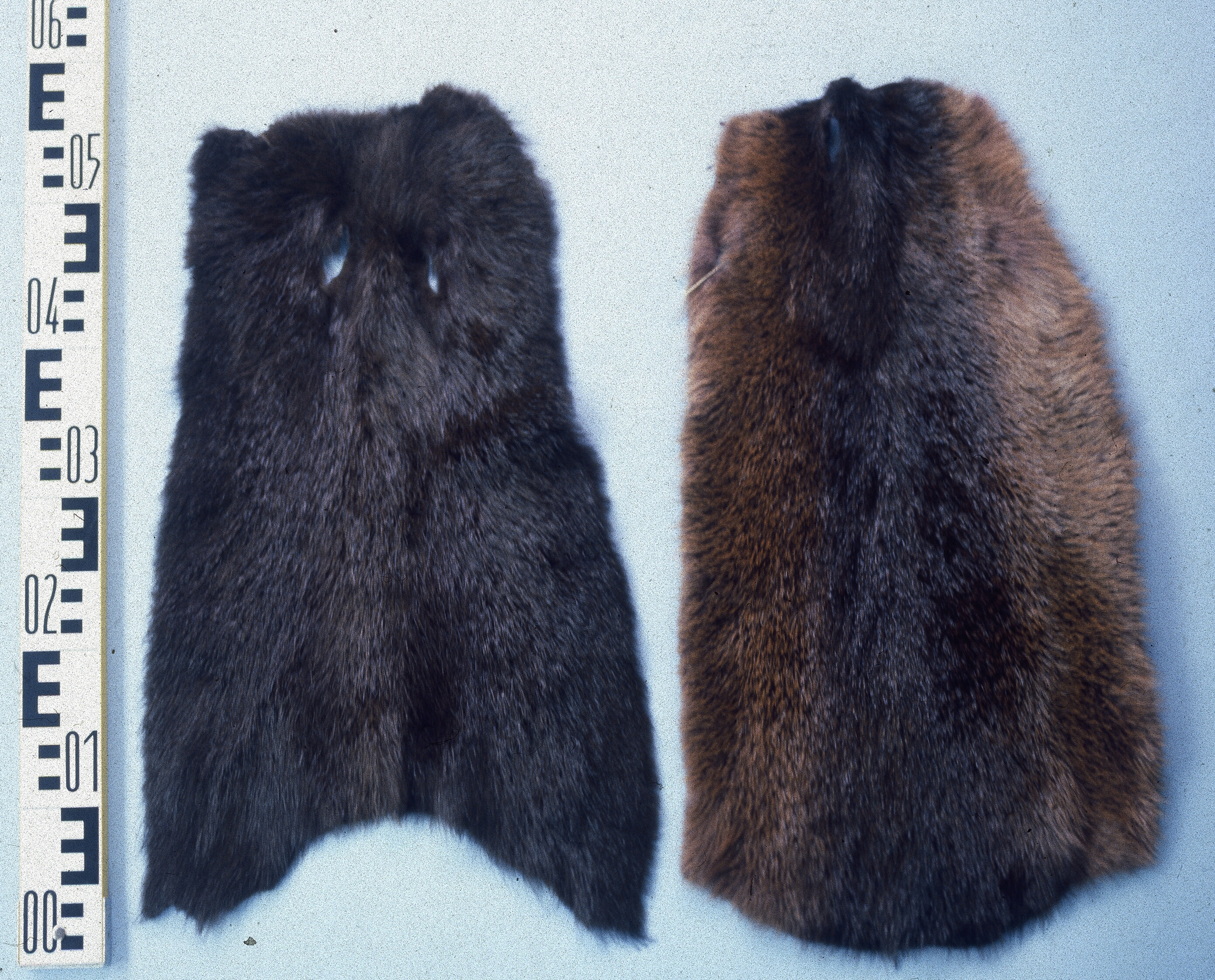
Dyed pelts

=== Hair structure ===
The lowest part of the hair base is light-colored, almost white. Then a silver-colored part appears, which shades into medium to dark grey and finally brown-grey within a few millimeters. The ends of the wool are medium to dark brown-grey and give the hair base its color. The guard hairs show an increasing degree of cornification from the base to the tip. The guard cross-section is bean-shaped to oval; the wool hair cross-section is round to almost round. The particularly fine wool hairs are slightly curled. The proportion of guard hair in the pelt is varies greatly: there are soft, highly elastic types as well as longer, glassy, miscolored varieties. The guard hairs, which are particularly well developed in nutria, are yellowish, but the majority are yellow to orange in color and show the ring-shaped agouti contrast at the end of the hair.

=== Hide structure ===
The nutria fur has a distinctly porous structure. The long guard hairs run deep in the hide and often extend into the subcutaneous connective tissue, especially in the back. In the back tissue, the hide is several millimetres thick, in the belly part it is much thinner and more spongy.

Based on general experience, the durability coefficient for both plucked and unchanged nutria furs was given as 40 to 50%. (Note: The comparative values (coefficients) given are the result of comparative testing by furriers and fur traders with regard to the degree of apparent wear (usage). The numbers are not unambiguous; in addition to subjective observations of durability in practice, each individual case is influenced by tanning and finishing as well as numerous other factors. A more precise figure could only be determined on a scientific basis. The classification was made in steps of 10 percent each. The most durable fur types based on practical experience were set at 100 percent.) Another, unspecified list sets the durability at 35.5% and ranks it 25th on an incomplete durability scale, which traditionally begins with the fur of the sea otter, which is assumed to be the most durable, and ends here with the hare fur in 41st position. An American study ranked nutria fur at only 25% based on hair tests, contrary to practical experience.

When fur animals are divided into the fineness categories, among which are silky, fine, medium-fine, coarser and hard, the nutria hair is not included, with the indication that the upper hair is on the harder side, but the undercoat has an exceptionally soft texture.

== Wild nutria vs. farmed nutria ==
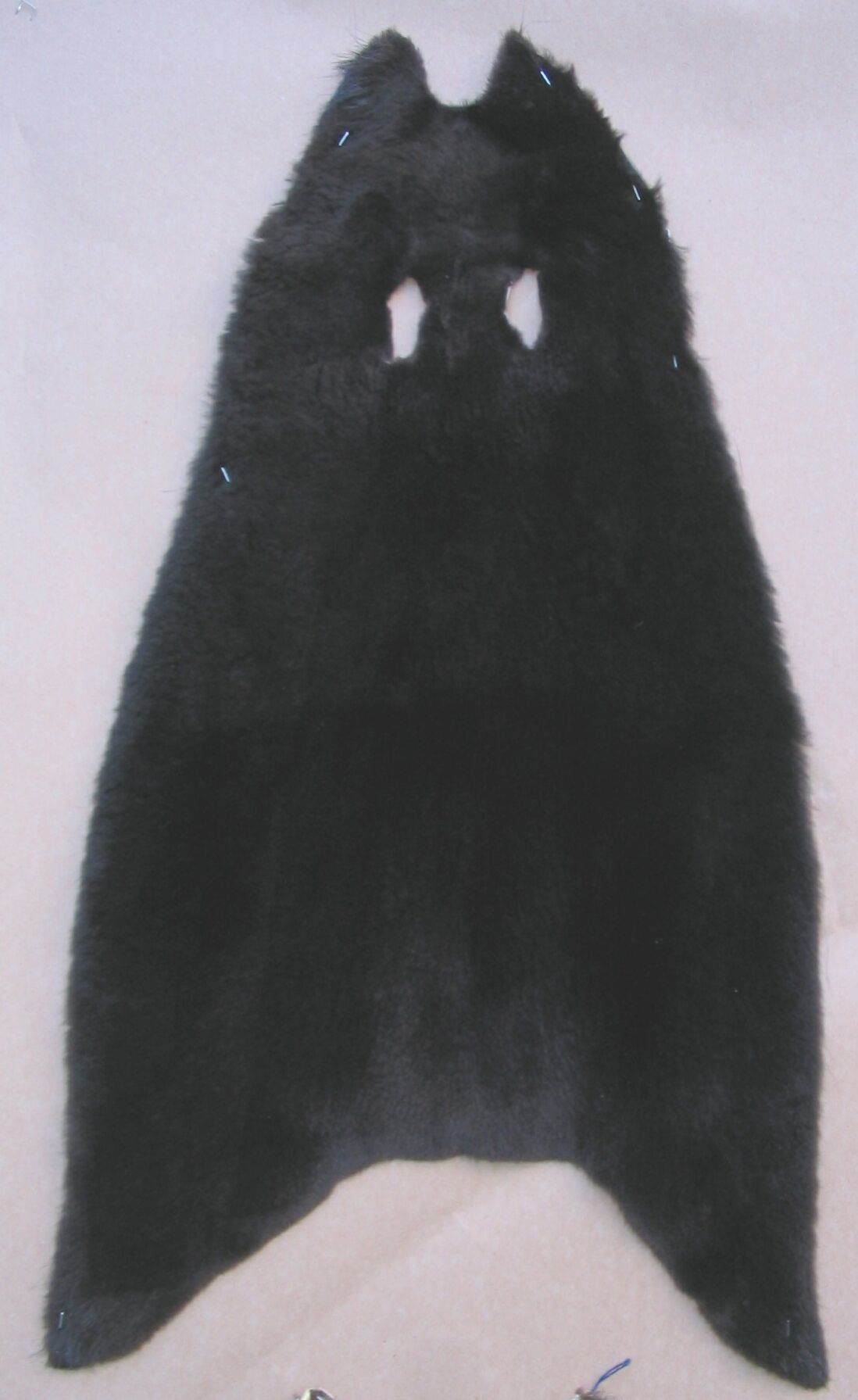
Plucked and dyed nutria (velvet nutria)

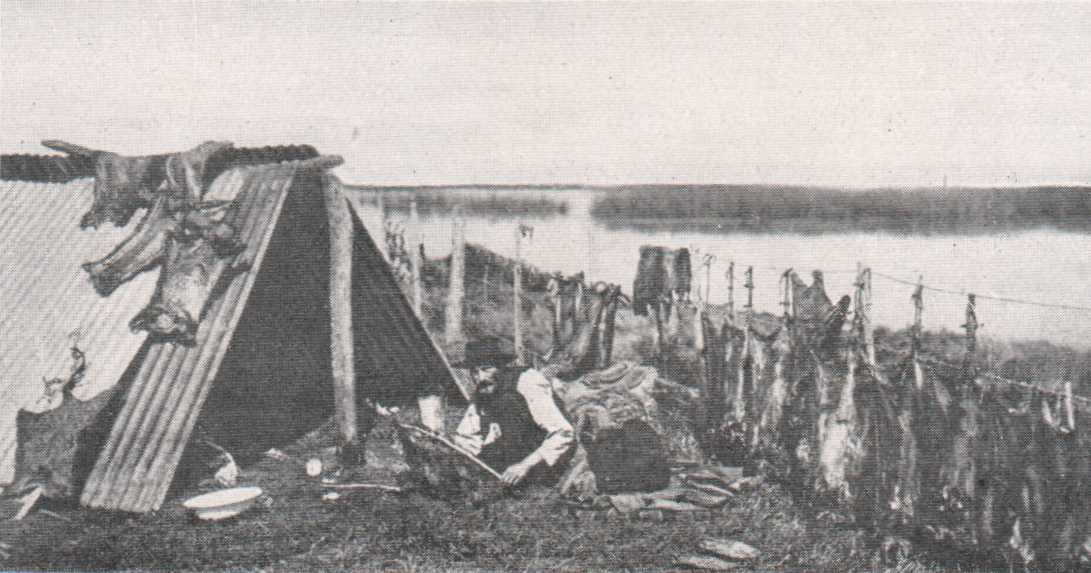
Camp of a nutria hunter on the Río Uruguay (before 1911)

=== Wild nutrias ===
As a result of excessive hunting, nutria populations in their South American homeland, from the equator to Patagonia, were severely depleted. While around 10 million pelts were still coming onto the world market from there in 1910, by 1930 there were only around 200.000. Conservation and protection laws in individual countries meant that significant exports from South America are once again coming onto the market.

Argentinian nutria were released in the Soviet Union in 1929/1930. In 1987, 36.000 nutria pelts from Mongolia were offered at Russian auctions, 3500 more than in the previous year.

In the 1930s, nutria farming for fur production began in the USA. When it became clear that nutria farming was not profitable, the animals were released. By 1988, 41 U.S. states and three Canadian provinces already had significant populations of nutria. In 1988, according to Kroll/Franke “the number of fur-bearing animals in the United States is 1.2 million (mainly from Louisiana) and rising”.

==== South America ====
===== Argentina =====
- Province of Buenos Aires: silky; gray undercoat with reddish-brown tips. Hair length on the back 17 to 19 milimiters (0.7 to 0.75 inches), on the belly 10 to 13 milimiters (0.4 to 0.5 inches). About 40% of Argentina's production comes from here, with the ones from Madariaga having the best quality.
- Isla (confluence of the Paraná-Uruguay and La Plata rivers): silkier undercoat than from Buenos Aires, slightly smaller pelts. Hair on the shaft is gray, tips are brown-gray; better than the provincial product. Hair length more even, less than 20 mm (0.8 inches).
- Rivers (from the provinces of Entre Ríos, Corrientes, parts of Santa Fe, Formosa, and Misiones): silky like the pelts from Islas, same size as those from the province of Buenos Aires. Grayest Argentine quality, gray hair ends, gray and gray-brown tips. Worse quality, but very dense and, compared to the back and belly, very evenly long hair.
- Southern ones (from the southern provinces of Rio Negro, Neuquen, Mendoza, Chubut, Santa Cruz): this is where the largest nutria pelts come from; they are about the same size as farmed pelts. The belly is pearl gray, the back is gray, and the tips are gray-brown. The length of the back hair is 22 to 26 mm, that of the belly hair 18 to 20 mm; the hair is very sparse.

===== Uruguay =====
Montevideo: worse quality coat, beautiful coloration.

===== Paraguay =====
Gran Chaco: less dense undercoat; slightly discolored; thin and less sturdy hide.

===== Brazil =====
Very poor quality of the hair, no supplies before 1988 at least.

To promote the domestic economy, Argentine nutria may not be exported raw; it must be processed in the country. For years, fur processing there was of very poor quality; the hide was often hard, not efficient, and not very tear-resistant. Now, however, the processing is on a par with that in Europe, and new, innovative styles and colors from there are also coming onto the world market.

The yield of South American wild fur in 1988 was around two million pieces (mostly from Argentina).

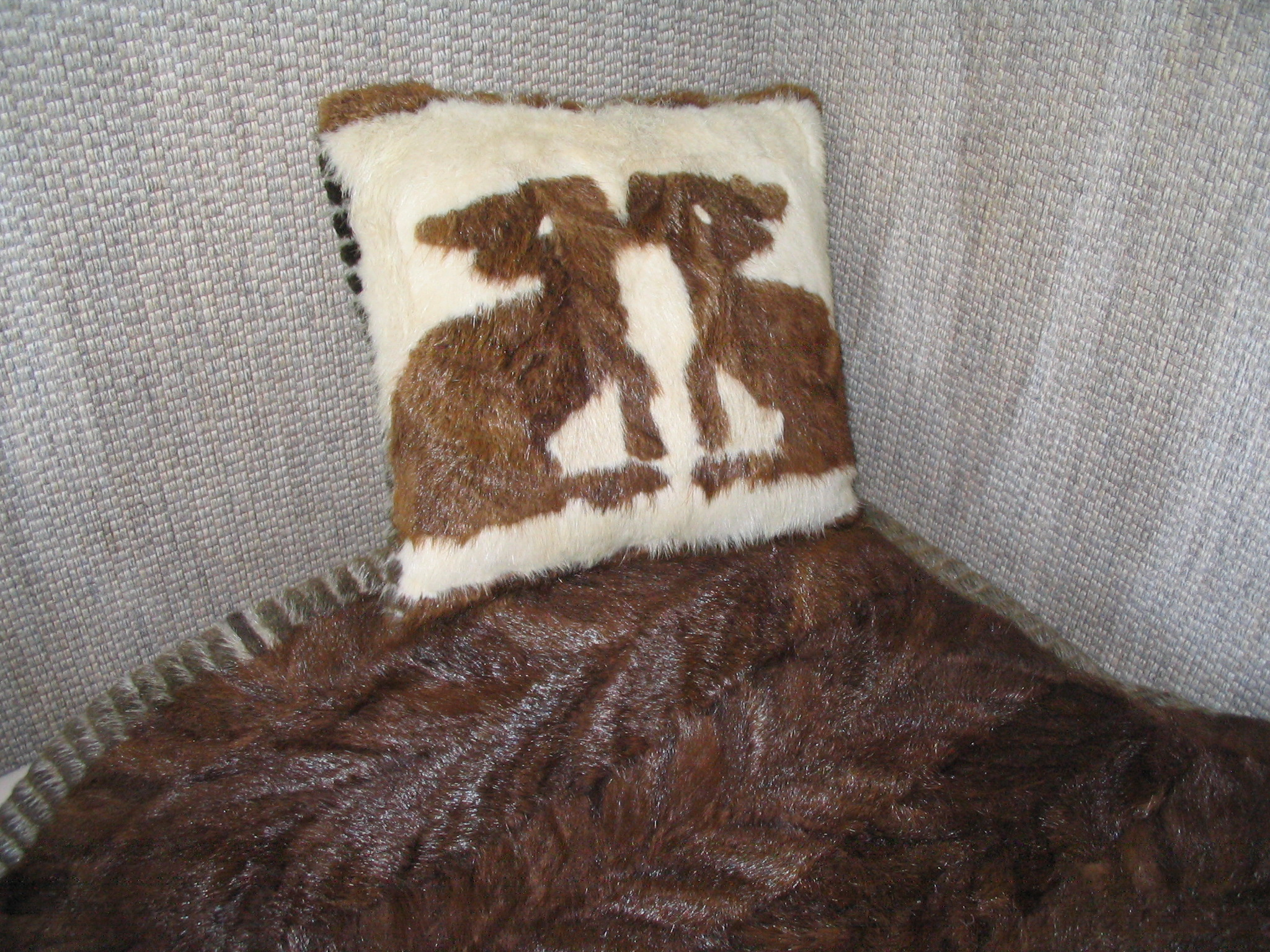
Blanket and pillow made from pieces of nutria, apprentice work (Wiesbaden, ca. 1987)

The best South American nutria pelts, especially the very dark ones, were traded until after the First World War under the name “Flores bags.” These were whole, uncut pelts that were slit only between the hind paws and then stretched over willow rods and dried. The “Paraná bags” had thicker hide, were somewhat lighter in color, and had coarser hair, while “Montevideo bags” had thick hide, lush fur, a rather brown coloration, and a large proportion of poorly colored pelts. For the finest pelts, the term “island goods” later came into use. “Lagoon goods” were considered to be about one third lower in quality than “island goods.” Nowadays, South American nutria pelts are mostly traded without any further distinction of provenance. Even the differences between South and North American grades were, in recent times, usually known only to wholesale raw-fur dealers. Today, the pelts almost exclusively reach the market as finished composite plates, already plucked, sheared, and usually dyed as well.

==== North America ====
The quality of the offspring of the originally released or escaped North American nutrias (see above) varies greatly; however, there are fewer poorly colored or spotted pelts. Hunting only began after the populations had increased dramatically.

In 1973, thirteen nutrias from Argentina were released into the coastal region of Louisiana. In less than twenty years, they had spread across most of the marshlands and became a nightmare. At the time, their pelts were of little value, the animals destroyed rice and sugar cane fields as well as the marshes, and they were blamed for the decline in the bison population, which was also used for fur farming. At first, nutria trapping proved very difficult for various reasons, despite support from the Ministry for Nature Conservation and Fisheries, not least because of the low pelt price. After the West German market for this product had been opened up, the nutria pelt yield in Louisiana in 1962, at 913,000, already considerably exceeded that of muskrats, at 633,000.

In North America, nutria fur has hardly been able to establish itself, and the German market now absorbs only insignificant quantities as well. In 2010, the Texas Tech University Museum published a statement saying that if the price of nutria fur remained so low, the increase in populations could become a problem. In 2008, Louisiana paid a $5 bounty per frozen nutria tail delivered, with the goal of catching 400,000 animals in the wetlands. In 2013, the Louisiana Department of Wildlife and Fisheries advertised up to six positions for trappers to catch nutria. The extent to which the pelts of the animals caught there are currently being sold is unclear.

The pelts from North America are slightly smaller and lighter brown than those from South America. 20 to 30% of the total yield are the so-called “Western” pelts, the rest are “Eastern,” including the “Centrals”. The thick-haired Western pelts are well suited for deep shearing, while the Eastern pelts are used more for high shearing (with some guard hair left on). U.S. pelts often show so-called “pinholes”, small holes caused by plants, which can reduce the value of the pelts by up to 90%.

Raw-material defects in wild nutria pelts:

- Bite marks, scars
- Grease-laden pelts: as a result of poor or incomplete removal of natural fat deposits, fat oxidation damage subsequently occurs. In addition, the pelt becomes more sensitive to heat during drying: hot fat leads to greasy, oil-soaked areas in the raw leather.
- So-called “burnt spots”: even if the pelts are free of fat, high temperatures can cause a kind of gluing or adhesion within the fiber structure of the raw hide.
- Spoiled pelts: caused by storing damp pelts for too long, during which the animal protein breaks down.
- Damage from skinning: Improper handling with tools during cutting may result in certain areas or entire sections to be scarred, sometimes even exposing the hair roots. This leads to insufficient hide durability, especially in the belly area.

Practical experience with raw wild nutria pelts has resulted in the following classification: up to 5% damaged pelts – very good quality; up to 10% – good to fair quality; up to 15% – fair to poor quality; over 15% – poor quality.

=== Farmed nutrias ===
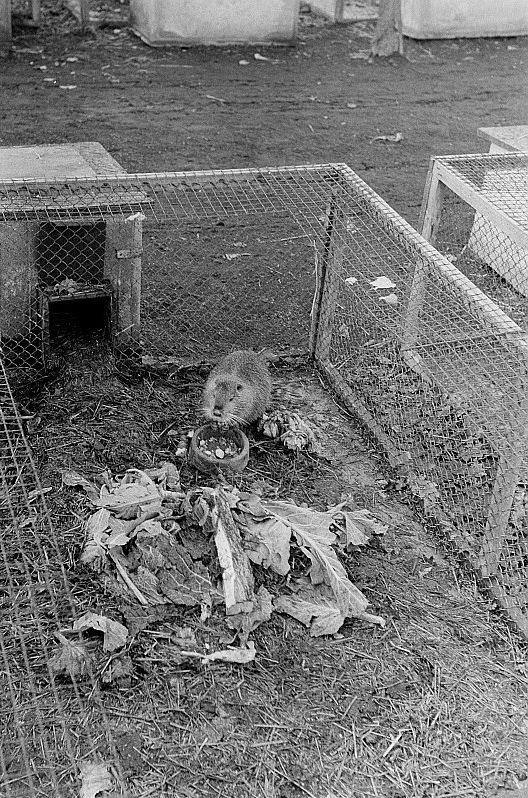
Nutria enclosure in Markkleeberg, East Germany (1949)

By the early decades of the 19th century, nutria populations in South America had declined to such an extent that a hat maker in Buenos Aires came up with the idea of establishing a nutria farm. Nothing is known about the outcome of this venture. Elsewhere, the year 1890 is given as the date of the establishment of a nutria farm in France. Around 1930, at the height of velvety seal fur fashion, systematic nutria breeding began (in Europe, North America, and South America, including Argentina and the Soviet Union).

The number of nutria breeders in German-speaking countries grew so large that, starting in July 1933, the Munich-based F. C. Mayer publishing house began including a separate monthly supplement, Der Nutria-Züchter (“The Nutria Breeder”), with its magazine Der Deutsche Pelztierzüchter (“The German Fur Animal Breeder”). When interest soon shifted to other types of fur, most breeding programs were quickly abandoned. After World War II, nutria breeding increased significantly again in some countries, including Germany, but commercial breeding no longer exists there. Today, most of the pelts come again from wild-caught animals in South America.

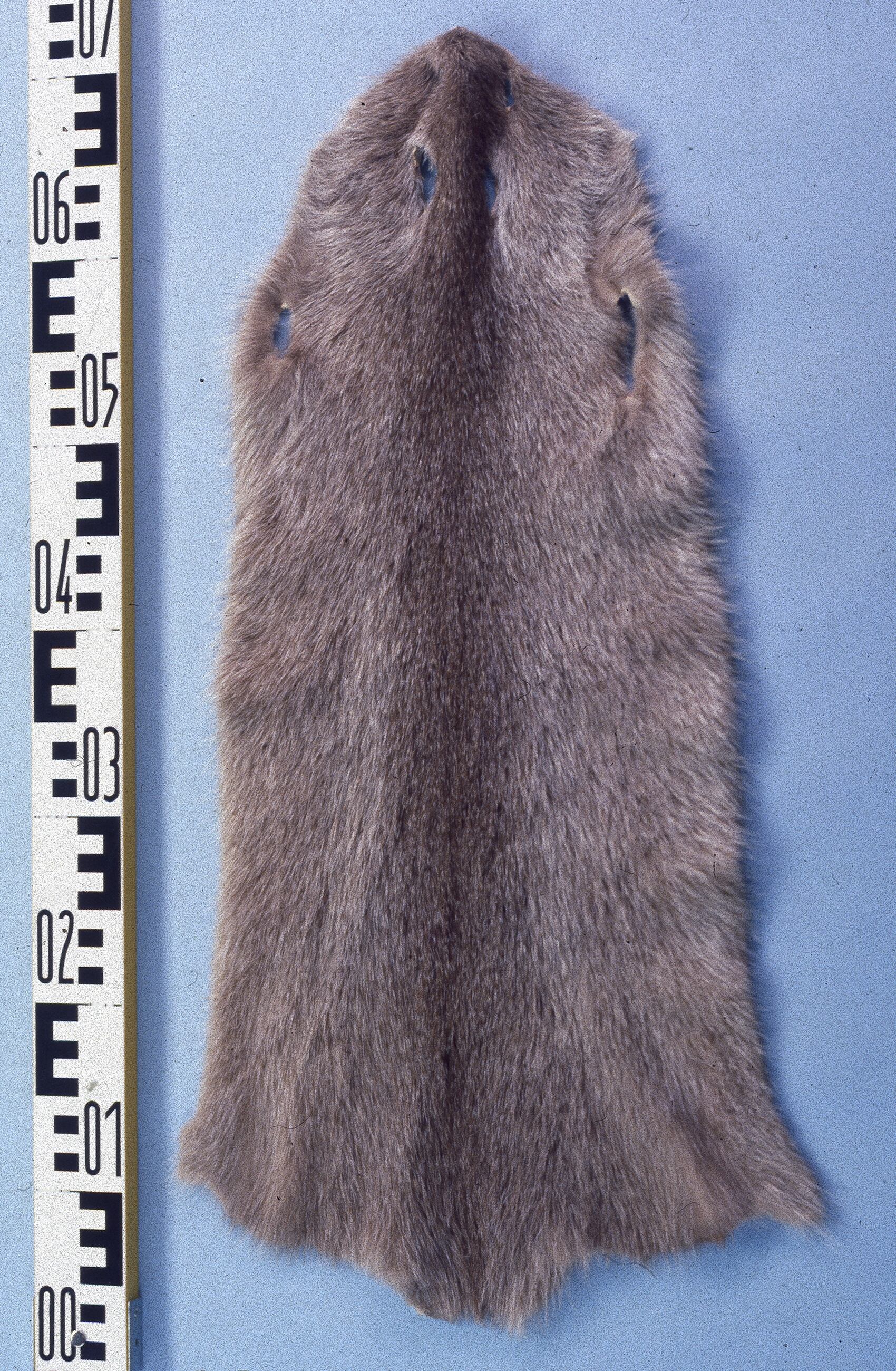
“Mutation nutria”

Most nutrias were bred in Poland. While there were only 59,000 pelts in 1959, 2.2 million came from there in 1988. The German Democratic Republic (East Germany) also supplied considerable numbers. What is striking about the largely nationalized GDR economy is the high private share of nutria production, which amounted to 73.4% in 1967. Besides, 19.5% came from state-owned farms and 0.6% from cooperative farms.

Nutria is a strict herbivore; its meat is very tasty and, moreover, very tender. For this reason, it is highly valued as a delicacy both by the local population in South America and by breeders in the West and East. Long after breeding for fur purposes was no longer profitable in western Germany, there were still a few animals kept there, mostly for personal consumption.

On average, farmed pelts are about 20% larger than pelts from the wild animals. The hide is stronger and the undercoat is woolier than in pelts from the wild.

As with minks and foxes, new color varieties were also bred in nutria. The main breeding colors are Standard, Black, Beige, Greenlander, White, Silver, Greenland-Silver, Pastel, Gold, and Cuba (brown). The beige-colored pelts are usually simply traded as “mutation nutria.” However, in 1967, the International Nutria Association decided on the following new names: “Blue Sapphire” for white; “Champagne Rose” for light beige; “Rayon de Lune” and “Faon Tahitien” for darker beige; ‘Topaze’ for light gold; “Ambre Doré” and “Or de Desert” for darker shades of gold. Gray tones are to be referred to as “Perl Grise”. As late as 1972, the final prices for mutation nutria pelts were many times higher than those for standard nutria pelts due to the significantly higher raw pelt price and the more limited product range due to the lower quantity available.

== History ==
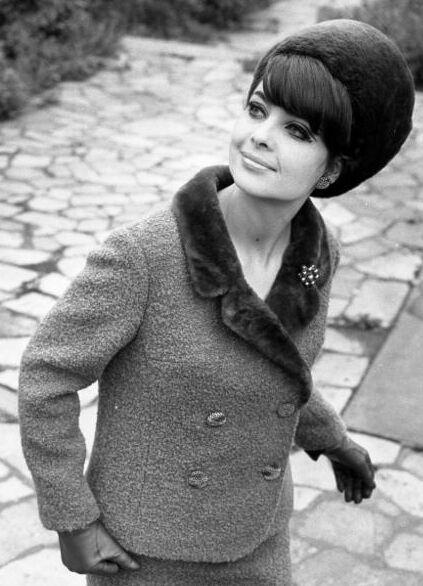
Cap and collar made from plucked nutria pelt (Leipzig, 1966)

It first became internationally popular as a fur in the 1930s, when it was worn by Hollywood stars such as Greta Garbo. It resembles beaver, with stiff guard hairs and a soft, short undercoat.

It was originally imported to the southern United States – possibly as early as the 19th century, although in larger numbers from the 1950s – to reduce the population of muskrat. Some escaped and found the swamps of Louisiana ideal territory, leading to their common name of swamp rat. With the decline in the fur market in the 1980s, the population mushroomed and threatened the stability of the wetland ecosystem by eating away the plants that hold the swamp together.

== Treatment ==
Typically, nutria is sheared or plucked for the fur trade. It can be dyed a variety of colors. Its middle weight – considerably lighter than beaver – also makes it suitable for linings. More recently, it is used by some furriers without plucking or shearing. In its natural colour it is light to rich brown, the most valuable furs being in the darker shades, but it may also be dyed.

A faux nutria, made of rabbit fur was at one time branded as nutriette.

== Rebranding as 'guilt free' ==
In 2010, both the BBC and The New York Times reported that nutria was being promoted as a socially acceptable way to wear fur, with a fashion show held in Brooklyn sponsored by the Barataria-Terrebonne National Estuary Program, a conservation body working to preserve Louisiana swampland threatened by the nutria.

== Designers using nutria ==
Oscar de la Renta and Michael Kors are among the designers to have incorporated nutria into their designs, with de La Renta using it on hats and trims and Kors using it to line raincoats.
