= SOLS Foundation =

Malaysian education and training organization

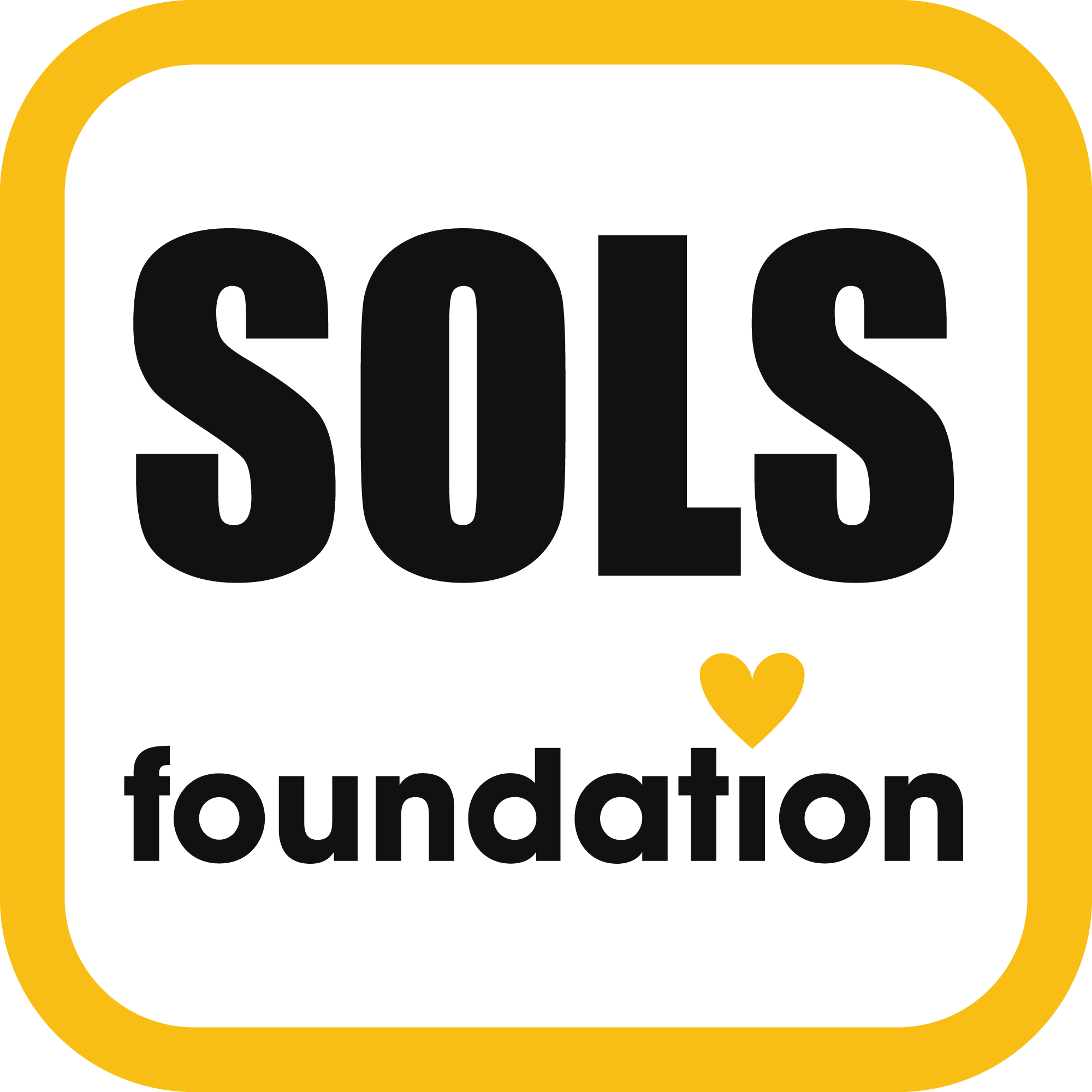
- SOLS Foundation Logo
- Founded: 2007
- Founder: Raj Ridvan Singh
- Type: Non-governmental organization
- Purpose: Serve, Educate, Empower Underprivileged Communities
- Headquarters: Kuala Lumpur, Malaysia
- Location: Malaysia
- Origins: Malacca, Malaysia
- Region served: Asia
- Employees: 100
- Volunteers: 50
- Website: https://sols.foundation

SOLS Foundation (previously known as "Science of Life Studies 24/7" or "SOLS 24/7"), is tax exempted, humanitarian organisation registered in Malaysia.

The organisation was created to help transition the bottom 40% of household income earners (B40) to the middle class by equipping them with knowledge and skills to progress out of poverty through online language and educational courses, training, personal development, and employment and entrepreneurship support.

Their non-formal education programs are provided free of charge to underserved communities and they currently have 4 ongoing programs and projects in Malaysia.

Among its objectives is to develop and implement holistic training programs that are effective, relevant to the community as well as easily applied and replicated. The programs focus on academic skills, such as English, Digital skills, Professional and Personal Development, Solar PV installation and maintenance as well as life skills.

In 2013, co-founder Raj Ridvan Singh further expanded the vision and mission of SOLS Foundation and founded its Social Empowerment Arm.

== History ==
=== Country Founding Dates ===
Cambodia: Started by Raj Ridvan Singh's father, brother and himself in January 2000 (under registration of LCDI), and officially re-registered in 2005 (under registration GDI). Currently run by different management under the name AHHA Education Cambodia.

East Timor: Started by Raj Ridvan Singh in November 2006, currently run by different management under the name AHHA-Education Timor Leste.

Malaysia: Started by Raj Ridvan Singh in November 2007.

=== Official Registration ===
SOLS Foundation is registered with the Companies Commission of Malaysia as a company limited by guarantee with the registration number 811025T since March 25, 2008.

It later received tax exemption status from the Inland Registration Board in April 2014.

=== Founders ===
SOLS Foundation was founded by Raj Ridvan Singh (1983), his father (1957) and his brother (1984).

Raj Ridvan Singh is SOLS Foundation Chairman and CEO.

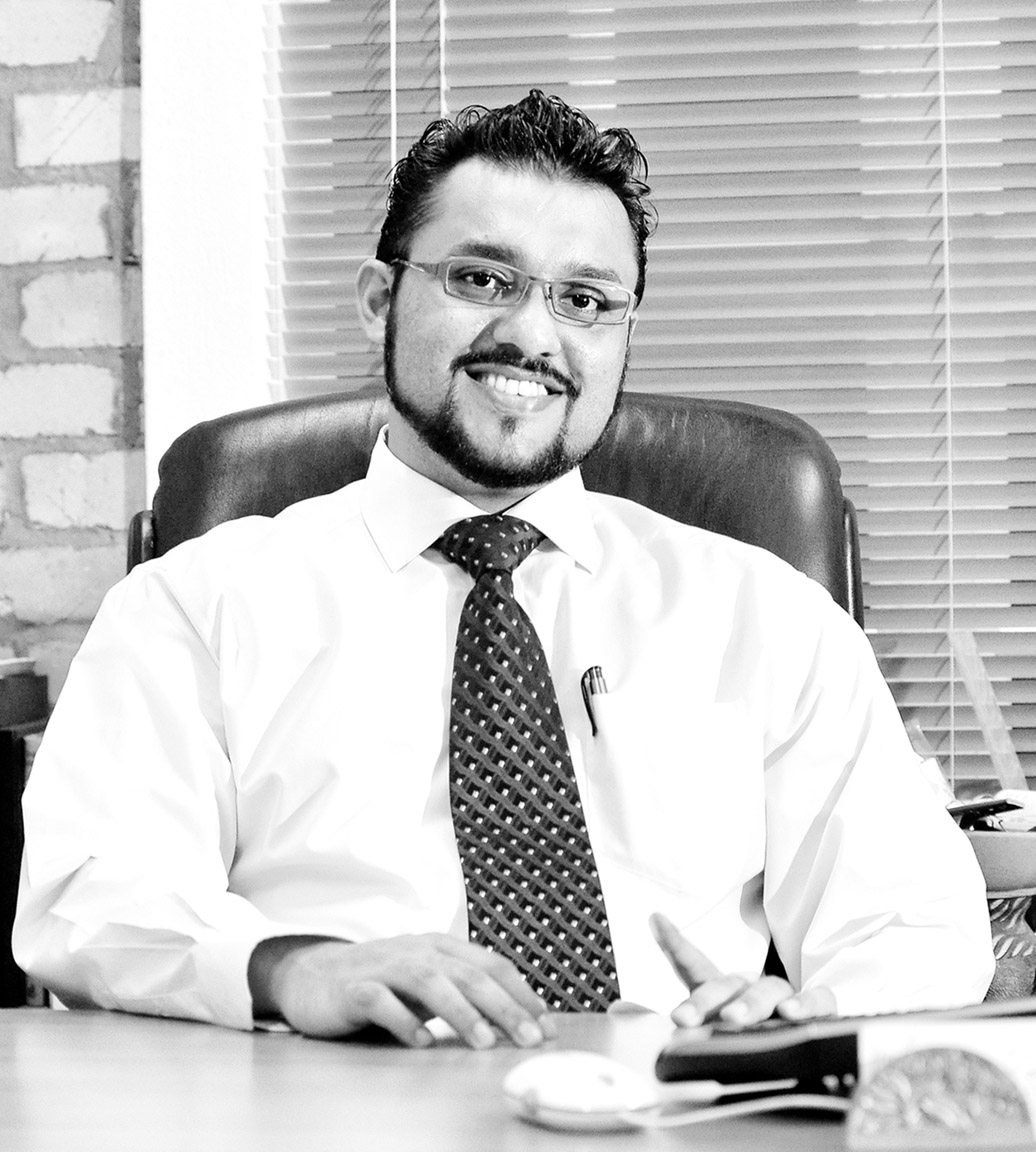
Teacher Raj Ridvan Singh

==== Raj Ridvan Singh ====
Raj Ridvan Singh left school in Malacca at the age of 14 without sitting for the Penilaian Menengah Rendah (PMR) Malaysian public examinations.

Instead, he completed three engineering courses at Cambodia's Norton University where his father was lecturing. He was not accepted to continue his studies in some colleges in Thailand and Malaysia due to his lack of Sijil Pelajaran Malaysia (SPM) qualifications. Raj Ridvan Singh enrolled himself in a computer system engineering class in New Horizon's Computer Learning Center in Malacca when he was 15. At 16, he became the youngest Microsoft Certified Systems Engineer in ASEAN. After his graduation, Raj Ridvan Singh turned down a well paying IT-centered job and chose to return to Cambodia to support and set up SOLS 24/7 with his father and brother.

For his continuous efforts in social work and youth education, he was awarded:

- YouthActionNet Award-2004 by International Youth Foundation.
- The Youth & ICT Award-2005 by Global Knowledge Partnership, and was presented the Youth Social Enterprise Fellowship by YSEI in 2006.
- The KLUE Blue Chilli Award Malaysia 2008.
- Finalist Commonwealth Youth Worker Award in 2014.
- Golden Globe Tigers Summit NGO Leader Award in 2015.
- Social Entrepreneur of the Year, SME & Entrepreneurship Business Awards in 2017.
- First Malaysian to be selected for the International Ford Motor Company Fellowship, Columbia University New York, in 2015.
- Europa Awards for Sustainability, Best Sustainability Leader in 2018.
- August Man Men of the Year: Education in 2018.
- President of TeAM (Technopreneurs Association of Malaysia).
- Elected by Malaysian Prime Minister, YAB Datuk Seri Anwar Ibrahim as member of the National Digital Economy and Fourth Industrial Revolution (4IR) council (MED4IRN) in August 2023.

He also secured a Microsoft Grant for the SOLS 24/7 social enterprise in Timor-Leste after presenting to a panel during the Scale-up Pitching session at YSEF in 2008. In 2009 he set up two state-of-the-art ICT Labs for the Universidade Nacional de Timor-Leste fully funded by USAID. Raj Ridvan Singh has been instrumental in establishing the SOLS 24/7 Malaysia Youth Development Center, in Kuala Lumpur.

Raj Ridvan Singh received a letter of praise and support from Nobel Peace Prize Laureate and President of Timor Leste Dr. Jose Ramos Horta for SOLS 24/7's efforts in Timor Leste in July 2009.

=== Science of Life Studies 24/7 meaning ===
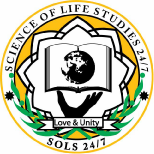
Science of Life Studies 24/7 alternative logo

'Science of Life' comes from the concept that if every child could be scientifically shown the challenges and possibilities they would face in life and also shown their true self, they will be able to prepare and develop all the skills needed to live a great life. 'Life' constitutes all the time (24 hours a day, 7 days a week), and is represented now. Not the future, or after life only.

'Science of Life' is also the name of the comprehensive program for personal and youth development which is taught exclusively in all SOLS 24/7 training centers. This program explores human potential through a series of concepts, discussions, activities and real life examples dealing with topics such as 'Leadership', 'Character Development', 'Responsibility', 'Love & Unity', 'Righteousness', 'Dynamism' and much more.

=== Expansion ===
==== Timor-Leste ====
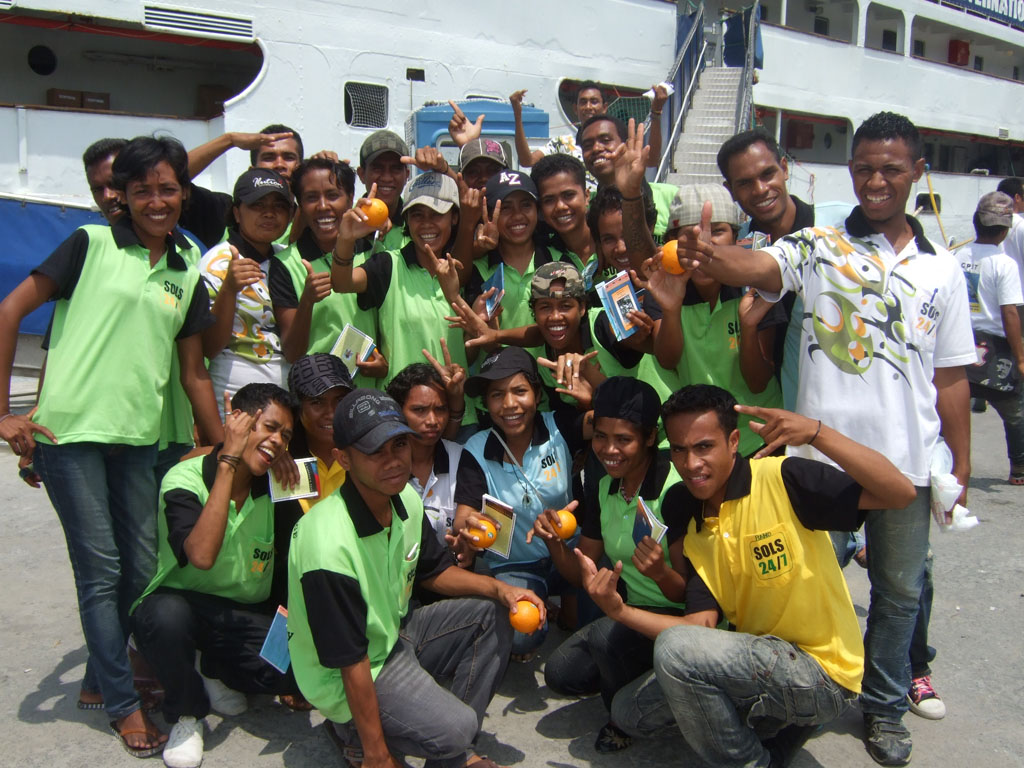
SOLS 24/7 Timor-Leste students on a field trip

SOLS 24/7 made the decision to expand from Cambodia to Timor-Leste (East Timor) in 2005, as it was one of the poorest countries in Asia and years of civil war had resulted in a lack of educational opportunities for youth in the country. SOLS 24/7 set up a training center in the country's capital, Dili. However, the early stages of SOLS 24/7 beginning in Timor-Leste happened during the crisis period of the country. Due to the unrest in the country, they had to evacuate and could only return in October 2006.

In 2006 Raj Ridvan Singh applied to get funds from “Youth Social Enterprise Initiative“(YSEI). YSEI is a program designed to support projects by young people who use innovative solutions to address social problems, specifically those using information and communications technology (ICT) for development. Raj Ridvan Singh was the sole Malaysian representative among 10 short-listed finalists. He received a grant of US$15,000 for the start of East Timor project.

The SOLS 24/7 Main Training Center, Dili officially opened its doors to the Timorese youth in November 2006. From an initial 16 students, SOLS 24/7 now has training centers in 11 of the 12 districts in Timor-Leste.

==== Malaysia ====
Keen to set up a Youth Development Center in his homeland, Raj Ridvan Singh returned to Malaysia in 2008 and set up the first SOLS 24/7 Training Center in Malacca, the state in which he was born. Starting again with 16 students from Indian, Orang Asli backgrounds, Punjabi backgrounds. 15 Timorese youth who were Malaysia on medical reasons were also part of the training program. The SOLS 24/7 training center was located in Jalan Kee Ann, Malacca before moving to Segambut, Kuala Lumpur in April 2011 where the SOLS Solar Academy was set up in 2015.

SOLS 24/7 is also operating another initiative called SOLS Computers which refurbishes donated computers and distributes it to rural and poor welfare homes, orphanages, old folks home and communities. SOLS 24/7 is also a Microsoft Registered Refurbisher.

The documentary "SOLS Solution" was filmed at the SOLS 24/7 location in Kuala Lumpur in 2015.

== Education Programs ==
=== Skills Hub ===
SOLS Foundation offers a wide range of free online classes to improve your academic, professional and personal skills. This program is designed for people who are looking to customise their own programme and study at their own pace. Skills Hub allows students to select specific skills to learn with various options to choose from such as how to:

- Apply for a Job
- Use Digital Tools for my Career
- Be More Effective at Work
- Communicate Professionally
- Handle My Finances
- Manage my Wellbeing
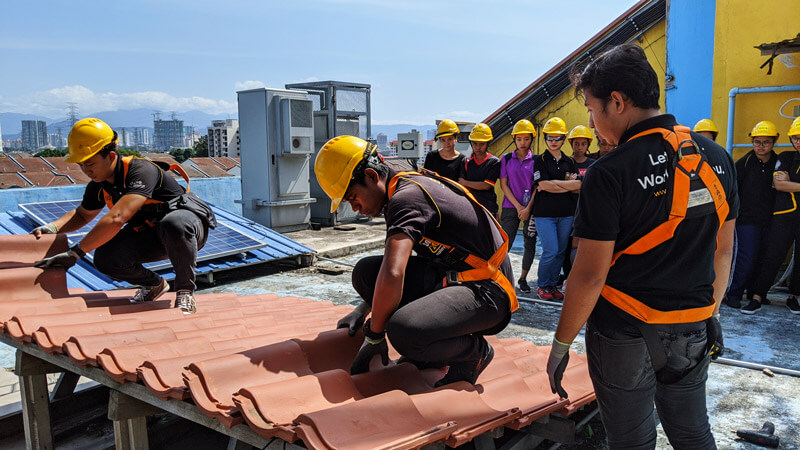
  SOLS Solar Academy students in practical work training class

=== TVET Academy ===
Technical and Vocational Education and Training (TVET) is one of the most accessible tertiary education options for B40 youth, hence over 90% of the students are from this socio-economic background. It is also a critical pathway to being employed in a safe job that sets youth up for growth. However, a survey conducted by SOLS Foundation reveals that TVET graduates can secure employment, but are not able to successfully perform in their role and may drop their first employment in the first year. The reason for this is that the TVET certification does not equip them with professional skills, digital skills, attitudes and strong working habits like discipline and commitment that contributes to job resilience.

The TVET Academy programme aims to equip these graduates with skills to choose and win the right job, succeed professionally and build progressive careers that allow them to grow in a career pathway. The enrichment program helps graduates develop academic and job readiness skills, life skills/mental habits and professional skills, delivered through a hybrid of online and in-person learning to be able to secure a job and progress in their career.

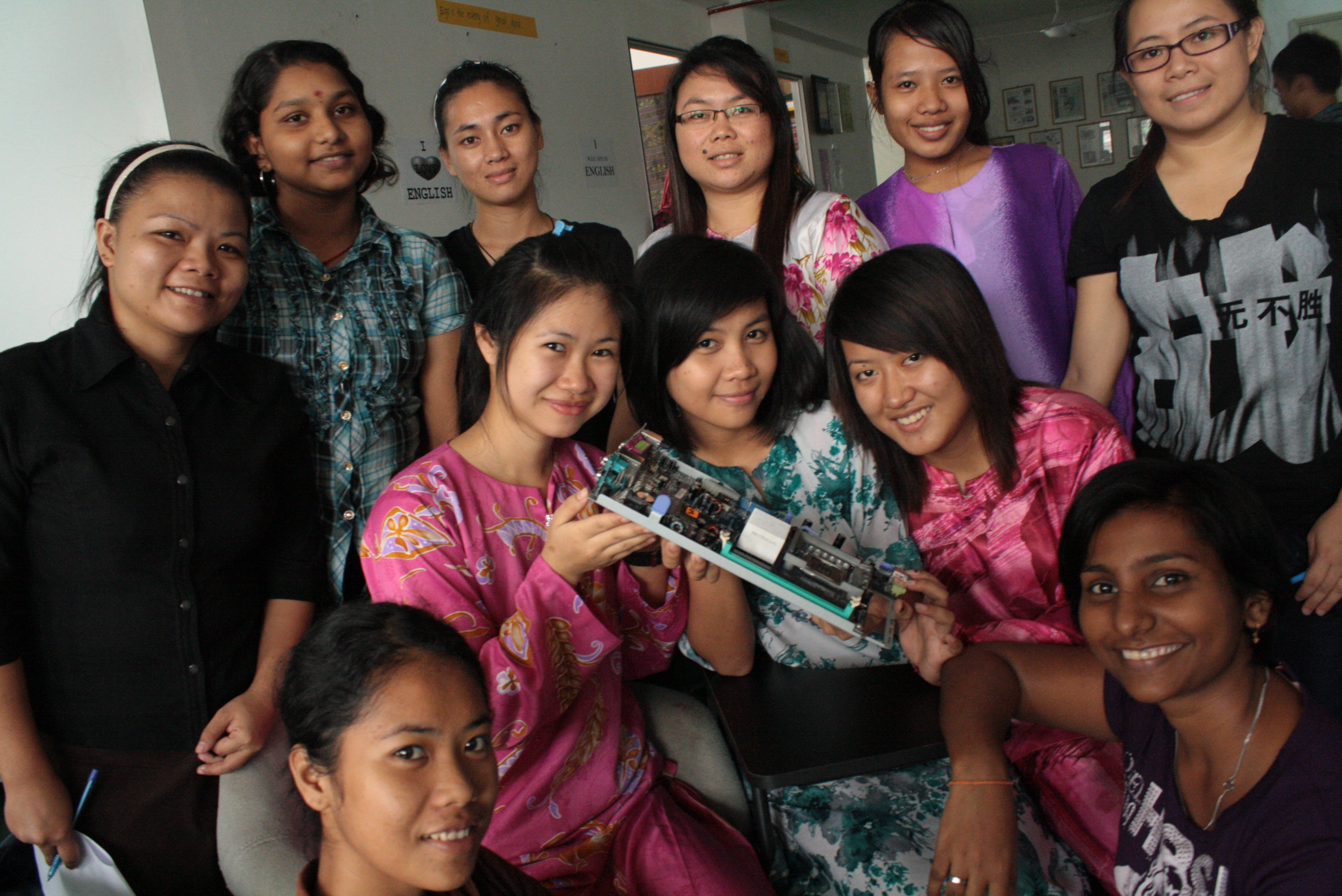
SOLS 247 students, computer class

== Other activities ==
SOLS 24/7 also acts as a hub for blood donations, community area cleaning, vaccinations as well as partnering with other NGO's and grassroots projects to generate a greater impact for those in need.
