= List of awards and nominations received by Seinfeld =

List of awards and nominations for Seinfeld
Awards and nominations
| Award | Wins | Nominations |
| Actor Awards | 6 | 17 |
| ACE Eddie Awards | 1 | 4 |
| Aftonbladets TV-pris | 2 | 2 |
| American Comedy Awards | 10 | 23 |
| American Television Awards | 4 | 5 |
| Artios Awards | 3 | 9 |
| ASCAP Film and Television Music Awards | 6 | 6 |
| British Comedy Awards | 1 | 1 |
| Directors Guild of America Awards | 3 | 9 |
| GLAAD Media Awards | 1 | 1 |
| Golden Globe Awards | 3 | 15 |
| Peabody Awards | 1 | 1 |
| People's Choice Awards | 4 | 6 |
| Primetime Emmy Awards | 10 | 68 |
| Producers Guild of America Awards | 1 | 3 |
| Q Awards | 5 | 26 |
| Satellite Awards | 0 | 3 |
| TCA Awards | 3 | 13 |
| TV Guide Awards | 4 | 9 |
| TV Land Awards | 0 | 9 |
| Writers Guild of America Awards | 4 | 14 |

Totals (Note: Certain award groups do not simply award one winner. They acknowledge several different recipients, have runners-up, and have third place. Since this is a specific recognition and is different from losing an award, runner-up mentions are considered wins in this award tally. For simplification and to avoid errors, each award in this list has been presumed to have had a prior nomination.)
- Wins: 72
- Nominations: 244

This is the list of awards and nominations received by the American television sitcom Seinfeld.

== Awards and nominations ==
Awards and nominations received by Seinfeld
| Award | Year (Note: The listed year refers to the date of the ceremony, not necessarily the year in which the corresponding season or episode aired) | Category | Nominee(s) | Result | Ref. |
|---|---|---|---|---|---|
| Actor Awards | 1995 | Outstanding Performance by a Male Actor in a Comedy Series | Jason Alexander | Won | |
| Actor Awards | 1995 | Outstanding Performance by a Female Actor in a Comedy Series | Julia Louis-Dreyfus | Nominated | |
| Actor Awards | 1995 | Outstanding Performance by an Ensemble in a Comedy Series | Jason Alexander, Julia Louis-Dreyfus, Michael Richards, Jerry Seinfeld | Won | |
| Actor Awards | 1996 | Outstanding Performance by a Male Actor in a Comedy Series | Jason Alexander | Nominated | |
| Actor Awards | 1996 | Outstanding Performance by a Male Actor in a Comedy Series | Michael Richards | Nominated | |
| Actor Awards | 1996 | Outstanding Performance by a Female Actor in a Comedy Series | Julia Louis-Dreyfus | Nominated | |
| Actor Awards | 1996 | Outstanding Performance by an Ensemble in a Comedy Series | Jason Alexander, Julia Louis-Dreyfus, Michael Richards, Jerry Seinfeld | Nominated | |
| Actor Awards | 1997 | Outstanding Performance by a Male Actor in a Comedy Series | Jason Alexander | Nominated | |
| Actor Awards | 1997 | Outstanding Performance by a Male Actor in a Comedy Series | Michael Richards | Nominated | |
| Actor Awards | 1997 | Outstanding Performance by a Female Actor in a Comedy Series | Julia Louis-Dreyfus | Won | |
| Actor Awards | 1997 | Outstanding Performance by an Ensemble in a Comedy Series | Jason Alexander, Julia Louis-Dreyfus, Michael Richards, Jerry Seinfeld | Won | |
| Actor Awards | 1998 | Outstanding Performance by a Male Actor in a Comedy Series | Jason Alexander | Nominated | |
| Actor Awards | 1998 | Outstanding Performance by a Male Actor in a Comedy Series | Michael Richards | Nominated | |
| Actor Awards | 1998 | Outstanding Performance by a Female Actor in a Comedy Series | Julia Louis-Dreyfus | Won | |
| Actor Awards | 1998 | Outstanding Performance by an Ensemble in a Comedy Series | Jason Alexander, Julia Louis-Dreyfus, Michael Richards, Jerry Seinfeld | Won | |
| Actor Awards | 1999 | Outstanding Performance by a Male Actor in a Comedy Series | Jason Alexander | Nominated | |
| Actor Awards | 1999 | Outstanding Performance by a Female Actor in a Comedy Series | Julia Louis-Dreyfus | Nominated | |
| ACE Eddie Awards | 1994 | Best Edited Half-Hour Series for Television | Janet Ashikaga (for "The Lip Reader") | Nominated | |
| ACE Eddie Awards | 1995 | Best Edited Half-Hour Series for Television | Janet Ashikaga (for "The Race") | Nominated | |
| ACE Eddie Awards | 1996 | Best Edited Half-Hour Series for Television | Janet Ashikaga (for "The Hot Tub") | Nominated | |
| ACE Eddie Awards | 1997 | Best Edited Half-Hour Series for Television | Skip Collector (for "The Abstinence") | Won | |
| Aftonbladets TV-pris | 1998 | Best Foreign TV Personality – Male | Jerry Seinfeld | Won | |
| Aftonbladets TV-pris | 1999 | Best Foreign TV Personality – Male | Jerry Seinfeld | Won | |
| American Comedy Awards | 1992 | Funniest Male Performer in a TV Series (Leading Role) Network, Cable or Syndication | Jerry Seinfeld | Won | |
| American Comedy Awards | 1992 | Funniest Supporting Male Performer in a TV Series | Jason Alexander | Won | |
| American Comedy Awards | 1993 | Funniest Male Performer in a TV Series (Leading Role) Network, Cable or Syndication | Jerry Seinfeld | Won | |
| American Comedy Awards | 1993 | Funniest Supporting Male Performer in a TV Series | Jason Alexander | Won | |
| American Comedy Awards | 1993 | Funniest Supporting Female Performer in a TV Series | Julia Louis-Dreyfus | Won | |
| American Comedy Awards | 1994 | Funniest Male Performer in a TV Series (Leading Role) Network, Cable or Syndication | Jerry Seinfeld | Nominated | |
| American Comedy Awards | 1994 | Funniest Supporting Male Performer in a TV Series | Jason Alexander | Nominated | |
| American Comedy Awards | 1994 | Funniest Supporting Male Performer in a TV Series | Michael Richards | Nominated | |
| American Comedy Awards | 1994 | Funniest Supporting Female Performer in a TV Series | Julia Louis-Dreyfus | Won | |
| American Comedy Awards | 1995 | Funniest Supporting Female Performer in a TV Series | Julia Louis-Dreyfus | Won | |
| American Comedy Awards | 1996 | Funniest Male Performer in a TV Series (Leading Role) Network, Cable or Syndication | Jerry Seinfeld | Nominated | |
| American Comedy Awards | 1996 | Funniest Supporting Male Performer in a TV Series | Jason Alexander | Nominated | |
| American Comedy Awards | 1996 | Funniest Supporting Male Performer in a TV Series | Michael Richards | Nominated | |
| American Comedy Awards | 1996 | Funniest Supporting Female Performer in a TV Series | Julia Louis-Dreyfus | Nominated | |
| American Comedy Awards | 1997 | Funniest Supporting Male Performer in a TV Series | Jason Alexander | Nominated | |
| American Comedy Awards | 1997 | Funniest Supporting Male Performer in a TV Series | Michael Richards | Nominated | |
| American Comedy Awards | 1997 | Funniest Supporting Female Performer in a TV Series | Julia Louis-Dreyfus | Won | |
| American Comedy Awards | 1997 | Funniest Female Guest Appearance in a TV Series | Janeane Garofalo | Nominated | |
| American Comedy Awards | 1998 | Funniest Supporting Female Performer in a TV Series | Julia Louis-Dreyfus | Won | |
| American Comedy Awards | 1998 | Funniest Male Guest Appearance in a TV Series | Jerry Stiller | Won | |
| American Comedy Awards | 1999 | Funniest Supporting Male Performer in a TV Series | Jason Alexander | Nominated | |
| American Comedy Awards | 1999 | Funniest Supporting Male Performer in a TV Series | Michael Richards | Nominated | |
| American Comedy Awards | 1999 | Funniest Supporting Female Performer in a TV Series | Julia Louis-Dreyfus | Nominated | |
| American Television Awards | 1993 | Best Situation Comedy Series | Seinfeld | Won | |
| American Television Awards | 1993 | Best Actor in a Situation Comedy Series | Jerry Seinfeld | Won | |
| American Television Awards | 1993 | Best Supporting Actor in a Situation Comedy Series | Jason Alexander | Won | |
| American Television Awards | 1993 | Best Supporting Actor in a Situation Comedy Series | Michael Richards | Nominated | |
| American Television Awards | 1993 | Best Supporting Actress in a Situation Comedy Series | Julia Louis-Dreyfus | Won | |
| Artios Awards | 1991 | Best Casting for TV, Pilot | Marc Hirschfeld, Meg Liberman | Nominated | |
| Artios Awards | 1991 | Best Casting for TV, Comedy Episodic | Marc Hirschfeld, Meg Liberman | Won | |
| Artios Awards | 1992 | Best Casting for TV, Comedy Episodic | Marc Hirschfeld, Meg Liberman | Won | |
| Artios Awards | 1993 | Best Casting for TV, Comedy Episodic | Marc Hirschfeld, Meg Liberman | Won | |
| Artios Awards | 1994 | Best Casting for TV, Comedy Episodic | Marc Hirschfeld, Meg Liberman | Nominated | |
| Artios Awards | 1995 | Best Casting for TV, Comedy Episodic | Marc Hirschfeld, Meg Liberman | Nominated | |
| Artios Awards | 1996 | Best Casting for TV, Comedy Episodic | Marc Hirschfeld, Meg Liberman | Nominated | |
| Artios Awards | 1997 | Best Casting for TV, Comedy Episodic | Marc Hirschfeld, Meg Liberman | Nominated | |
| Artios Awards | 1998 | Best Casting for TV, Comedy Episodic | Marc Hirschfeld, Meg Liberman | Nominated | |
| ASCAP Film and Television Music Awards | 1994 | Top TV Series | Jonathan Wolff | Won | |
| ASCAP Film and Television Music Awards | 1995 | Top TV Series | Jonathan Wolff | Won | |
| ASCAP Film and Television Music Awards | 1996 | Top TV Series | Jonathan Wolff | Won | |
| ASCAP Film and Television Music Awards | 1997 | Top TV Series | Jonathan Wolff | Won | |
| ASCAP Film and Television Music Awards | 1998 | Top TV Series | Jonathan Wolff | Won | |
| ASCAP Film and Television Music Awards | 1999 | Top TV Series | Jonathan Wolff | Won | |
| British Comedy Awards | 2001 | Best International Comedy Show | Seinfeld | Won | |
| Directors Guild of America Awards | 1992 | Outstanding Directorial Achievement in Comedy Series | David Steinberg (for "The Tape") | Nominated | |
| Directors Guild of America Awards | 1993 | Outstanding Directorial Achievement in Comedy Series | Tom Cherones (for "The Contest") | Won | |
| Directors Guild of America Awards | 1993 | Outstanding Directorial Achievement in Comedy Series | Jason Alexander (for "The Good Samaritan") | Nominated | |
| Directors Guild of America Awards | 1994 | Outstanding Directorial Achievement in Comedy Series | Tom Cherones (for "The Mango") | Nominated | |
| Directors Guild of America Awards | 1995 | Outstanding Directorial Achievement in Comedy Series | Tom Cherones (for "The Opposite") | Nominated | |
| Directors Guild of America Awards | 1995 | Outstanding Directorial Achievement in Comedy Series | Andy Ackerman (for "The Race") | Nominated | |
| Directors Guild of America Awards | 1996 | Outstanding Directorial Achievement in Comedy Series | Andy Ackerman (for "The Gum") | Nominated | |
| Directors Guild of America Awards | 1997 | Outstanding Directorial Achievement in Comedy Series | Andy Ackerman (for "The Rye") | Won | |
| Directors Guild of America Awards | 1998 | Outstanding Directorial Achievement in Comedy Series | Andy Ackerman (for "The Betrayal") | Won | |
| GLAAD Media Awards | 1994 | Outstanding TV Comedy Series | Seinfeld | Won | |
| Golden Globe Awards | 1993 | Best Performance by an Actor in a Supporting Role in a Series, Miniseries or Motion Picture Made for Television | Jason Alexander | Nominated | |
| Golden Globe Awards | 1994 | Best Television Series – Musical or Comedy | Seinfeld | Won | |
| Golden Globe Awards | 1994 | Best Performance by an Actor in a Television Series – Musical or Comedy | Jerry Seinfeld | Won | |
| Golden Globe Awards | 1994 | Best Performance by an Actor in a Supporting Role in a Series, Miniseries or Motion Picture Made for Television | Jason Alexander | Nominated | |
| Golden Globe Awards | 1994 | Best Performance by an Actress in a Supporting Role in a Series, Miniseries or Motion Picture Made for Television | Julia Louis-Dreyfus | Won | |
| Golden Globe Awards | 1995 | Best Television Series – Musical or Comedy | Seinfeld | Nominated | |
| Golden Globe Awards | 1995 | Best Performance by an Actor in a Television Series – Musical or Comedy | Jerry Seinfeld | Nominated | |
| Golden Globe Awards | 1995 | Best Performance by an Actor in a Supporting Role in a Series, Miniseries or Motion Picture Made for Television | Jason Alexander | Nominated | |
| Golden Globe Awards | 1995 | Best Performance by an Actress in a Supporting Role in a Series, Miniseries or Motion Picture Made for Television | Julia Louis-Dreyfus | Nominated | |
| Golden Globe Awards | 1996 | Best Television Series – Musical or Comedy | Seinfeld | Nominated | |
| Golden Globe Awards | 1996 | Best Performance by an Actor in a Television Series – Musical or Comedy | Jerry Seinfeld | Nominated | |
| Golden Globe Awards | 1997 | Best Television Series – Musical or Comedy | Seinfeld | Nominated | |
| Golden Globe Awards | 1998 | Best Television Series – Musical or Comedy | Seinfeld | Nominated | |
| Golden Globe Awards | 1998 | Best Performance by an Actor in a Television Series – Musical or Comedy | Jerry Seinfeld | Nominated | |
| Golden Globe Awards | 1998 | Best Performance by an Actor in a Supporting Role in a Series, Miniseries or Motion Picture Made for Television | Jason Alexander | Nominated | |
| Peabody Awards | 1993 | Honoree (Note: Presented to NBC and Castle Rock Entertainment) | | Honored | |
| People's Choice Awards | 1993 | Favorite Male TV Performer | Jerry Seinfeld | Nominated | |
| People's Choice Awards | 1996 | Favorite TV Comedy Series | Seinfeld | Won | |
| People's Choice Awards | 1997 | Favorite TV Comedy Series | Seinfeld | Won | |
| People's Choice Awards | 1997 | Favorite Male TV Performer | Jerry Seinfeld | Nominated | |
| People's Choice Awards | 1998 | Favorite TV Comedy Series | Seinfeld | Won | |
| People's Choice Awards | 1999 | Favorite TV Comedy Series | Seinfeld | Won (Note: Tied with Frasier) | |
| Primetime Emmy Awards | 1991 | Outstanding Directing in a Comedy Series | Tom Cherones (for "The Pony Remark") | Nominated | |
| Primetime Emmy Awards | 1991 | Outstanding Writing in a Comedy Series | Larry David (for "The Deal") | Nominated | |
| Primetime Emmy Awards | 1991 | Outstanding Writing in a Comedy Series | Larry David, Jerry Seinfeld (for "The Pony Remark") | Nominated | |
| Primetime Emmy Awards | 1992 | Outstanding Comedy Series | Seinfeld (Note: Nominees: Larry Charles, Tom Cherones, Larry David, Elaine Pope, Andrew Scheinman, Jerry Seinfeld, George Shapiro, Joan Van Horn, Howard West) | Nominated | |
| Primetime Emmy Awards | 1992 | Outstanding Lead Actor in a Comedy Series | Jerry Seinfeld (for "The Boyfriend") | Nominated | |
| Primetime Emmy Awards | 1992 | Outstanding Supporting Actor in a Comedy Series | Jason Alexander (for "The Note" and "The Tape") | Nominated | |
| Primetime Emmy Awards | 1992 | Outstanding Supporting Actress in a Comedy Series | Julia Louis-Dreyfus (for "The Pen" and "The Tape") | Nominated | |
| Primetime Emmy Awards | 1992 | Outstanding Individual Achievement in Directing in a Comedy Series | David Steinberg (for "The Tape") | Nominated | |
| Primetime Emmy Awards | 1992 | Outstanding Individual Achievement in Writing in a Comedy Series | Larry David (for "The Parking Garage") | Nominated | |
| Primetime Emmy Awards | 1992 | Outstanding Individual Achievement in Writing in a Comedy Series | Larry David, Don McEnery, Bob Shaw (for "The Tape") | Nominated | |
| Primetime Emmy Awards | 1992 | Outstanding Individual Achievement in Writing in a Comedy Series | Larry Charles, Elaine Pope (for "The Fix-Up") | Won | |
| Primetime Emmy Awards | 1993 | Outstanding Comedy Series | Seinfeld (Note: Nominees: Larry Charles, Tom Cherones, Larry David, Tim Kaiser, Andrew Scheinman, Jerry Seinfeld, George Shapiro, Joan Van Horn, Howard West) | Won | |
| Primetime Emmy Awards | 1993 | Outstanding Lead Actor in a Comedy Series | Jerry Seinfeld (for "The Opera") | Nominated | |
| Primetime Emmy Awards | 1993 | Outstanding Supporting Actor in a Comedy Series | Jason Alexander (for "The Contest" and "The Outing") | Nominated | |
| Primetime Emmy Awards | 1993 | Outstanding Supporting Actor in a Comedy Series | Michael Richards (for "The Watch" and "The Junior Mint") | Won | |
| Primetime Emmy Awards | 1993 | Outstanding Supporting Actress in a Comedy Series | Julia Louis-Dreyfus (for "The Contest" and "The Airport") | Nominated | |
| Primetime Emmy Awards | 1993 | Outstanding Individual Achievement in Directing in a Comedy Series | Tom Cherones (for "The Contest") | Nominated | |
| Primetime Emmy Awards | 1993 | Outstanding Individual Achievement in Writing in a Comedy Series | Larry David (for "The Contest") | Won | |
| Primetime Emmy Awards | 1993 | Outstanding Individual Achievement in Writing in a Comedy Series | Larry Charles (for "The Outing") | Nominated | |
| Primetime Emmy Awards | 1994 | Outstanding Comedy Series | Seinfeld (Note: Nominees: Larry Charles, Tom Cherones, Larry David, Tom Gammill, Tim Kaiser, Peter Mehlman, Max Pross, Jerry Seinfeld, George Shapiro, Joan Van Horn, Howard West) | Nominated | |
| Primetime Emmy Awards | 1994 | Outstanding Lead Actor in a Comedy Series | Jerry Seinfeld (for "The Puffy Shirt") | Nominated | |
| Primetime Emmy Awards | 1994 | Outstanding Supporting Actor in a Comedy Series | Jason Alexander (for "The Hamptons" and "The Opposite") | Nominated | |
| Primetime Emmy Awards | 1994 | Outstanding Supporting Actor in a Comedy Series | Michael Richards (for "The Sniffing Accountant" and "The Opposite") | Won | |
| Primetime Emmy Awards | 1994 | Outstanding Supporting Actress in a Comedy Series | Julia Louis-Dreyfus (for "The Mango" and "The Opposite") | Nominated | |
| Primetime Emmy Awards | 1994 | Outstanding Individual Achievement in Directing in a Comedy Series | Tom Cherones (for "The Mango") | Nominated | |
| Primetime Emmy Awards | 1994 | Outstanding Individual Achievement in Writing in a Comedy Series | Lawrence H. Levy, Larry David (for "The Mango") | Nominated | |
| Primetime Emmy Awards | 1994 | Outstanding Individual Achievement in Writing in a Comedy Series | Larry David (for "The Puffy Shirt") | Nominated | |
| Primetime Emmy Awards | 1995 | Outstanding Comedy Series | Seinfeld (Note: Nominees: Larry David, Tom Gammill, Suzy Mamann Greenberg, Tim Kaiser, Peter Mehlman, Max Pross, Jerry Seinfeld, George Shapiro, Howard West) | Nominated | |
| Primetime Emmy Awards | 1995 | Outstanding Lead Actor in a Comedy Series | Jerry Seinfeld (for "The Diplomat's Club") | Nominated | |
| Primetime Emmy Awards | 1995 | Outstanding Supporting Actor in a Comedy Series | Jason Alexander (for "The Gymnast" and "The Race") | Nominated | |
| Primetime Emmy Awards | 1995 | Outstanding Supporting Actor in a Comedy Series | Michael Richards (for "The Jimmy" and "The Fusilli Jerry") | Nominated | |
| Primetime Emmy Awards | 1995 | Outstanding Supporting Actress in a Comedy Series | Julia Louis-Dreyfus (for "The Beard" and "The Fusilli Jerry") | Nominated | |
| Primetime Emmy Awards | 1995 | Outstanding Individual Achievement in Directing in a Comedy Series | Andy Ackerman (for "The Jimmy") | Nominated | |
| Primetime Emmy Awards | 1996 | Outstanding Comedy Series | Seinfeld (Note: Nominees: Larry David, Tom Gammill, Suzy Mamann Greenberg, Marjorie Gross, Tim Kaiser, Carol Leifer, Peter Mehlman, Max Pross, Jerry Seinfeld, George Shapiro, Nancy Sprow, Howard West) | Nominated | |
| Primetime Emmy Awards | 1996 | Outstanding Lead Actor in a Comedy Series | Jerry Seinfeld (for "The Gum") | Nominated | |
| Primetime Emmy Awards | 1996 | Outstanding Supporting Actor in a Comedy Series | Jason Alexander (for "The Pool Guy" and "The Invitations") | Nominated | |
| Primetime Emmy Awards | 1996 | Outstanding Supporting Actor in a Comedy Series | Michael Richards (for "The Pool Guy" and "The Wait Out") | Nominated | |
| Primetime Emmy Awards | 1996 | Outstanding Supporting Actress in a Comedy Series | Julia Louis-Dreyfus (for "The Soup Nazi" and "The Wait Out") | Won | |
| Primetime Emmy Awards | 1996 | Outstanding Directing for a Comedy Series | Andy Ackerman (for "The Soup Nazi") | Nominated | |
| Primetime Emmy Awards | 1996 | Outstanding Writing for a Comedy Series | Spike Feresten (for "The Soup Nazi") | Nominated | |
| Primetime Emmy Awards | 1997 | Outstanding Comedy Series | Seinfeld (Note: Nominees: Andy Ackerman, Alec Berg, Spike Feresten, Tom Gammill, Suzy Mamann Greenberg, Tim Kaiser, Gregg Kavet, Dave Mandel, Peter Mehlman, Max Pross, Andy Robin, Jeff Schaffer, Jerry Seinfeld, George Shapiro, Nancy Sprow, Howard West) | Nominated | |
| Primetime Emmy Awards | 1997 | Outstanding Supporting Actor in a Comedy Series | Jason Alexander (for "The Comeback") | Nominated | |
| Primetime Emmy Awards | 1997 | Outstanding Supporting Actor in a Comedy Series | Michael Richards (for "The Chicken Roaster") | Won | |
| Primetime Emmy Awards | 1997 | Outstanding Supporting Actress in a Comedy Series | Julia Louis-Dreyfus (for "The Little Kicks") | Nominated | |
| Primetime Emmy Awards | 1997 | Outstanding Directing for a Comedy Series | Andy Ackerman (for "The Pothole") | Nominated | |
| Primetime Emmy Awards | 1997 | Outstanding Writing for a Comedy Series | Jill Franklyn, Peter Mehlman (for "The Yada Yada") | Nominated | |
| Primetime Emmy Awards | 1998 | Outstanding Comedy Series | Seinfeld (Note: Nominees: Andy Ackerman, Alec Berg, Jennifer Crittenden, Spike Feresten, Suzy Mamann Greenberg, Tim Kaiser, Gregg Kavet, Steve Koren, David Mandel, Andy Robin, Jeff Schaffer, Jerry Seinfeld, George Shapiro, Nancy Sprow, Howard West) | Nominated | |
| Primetime Emmy Awards | 1998 | Outstanding Supporting Actor in a Comedy Series | Jason Alexander (for "The Strike") | Nominated | |
| Primetime Emmy Awards | 1998 | Outstanding Supporting Actress in a Comedy Series | Julia Louis-Dreyfus | Nominated | |
| Primetime Creative Arts Emmy Awards | 1990 | Outstanding Editing for a Miniseries or a Special (Multi-Camera Production) | Robert Souders (for "The Stake Out") | Nominated | |
| Primetime Creative Arts Emmy Awards | 1992 | Outstanding Individual Achievement in Editing for a Series (Multi-Camera Production) | Janet Ashikaga (for "The Subway") | Won | |
| Primetime Creative Arts Emmy Awards | 1993 | Outstanding Guest Actor in a Comedy Series | Bill Erwin (for "The Old Man") | Nominated | |
| Primetime Creative Arts Emmy Awards | 1993 | Outstanding Individual Achievement in Editing for a Series (Multi-Camera Production) | Janet Ashikaga (for "The Pilot") | Nominated | |
| Primetime Creative Arts Emmy Awards | 1993 | Outstanding Individual Achievement in Sound Mixing for a Comedy Series or a Special | Charlie McDaniel, Craig Porter, Peter A. San Filipo (for "The Airport") | Nominated | |
| Primetime Creative Arts Emmy Awards | 1994 | Outstanding Guest Actor in a Comedy Series | Judge Reinhold (for "The Raincoats") | Nominated | |
| Primetime Creative Arts Emmy Awards | 1994 | Outstanding Guest Actress in a Comedy Series | Marlee Matlin (for "The Lip Reader") | Nominated | |
| Primetime Creative Arts Emmy Awards | 1994 | Outstanding Individual Achievement in Editing for a Series (Multi-Camera Production) | Janet Ashikaga (for "The Opposite") | Won (Note: Tied with Ron Volk from Frasier (for "The Show Where Lilith Comes Back")) | |
| Primetime Creative Arts Emmy Awards | 1994 | Outstanding Individual Achievement in Sound Mixing for a Comedy Series or a Special | Larry Ellena, Charlie McDaniel, Craig Porter, Peter A. San Filipo (for "The Bris") | Nominated | |
| Primetime Creative Arts Emmy Awards | 1995 | Outstanding Individual Achievement in Editing for a Series (Multi-Camera Production) | Janet Ashikaga (for "The Diplomat's Club") | Won | |
| Primetime Creative Arts Emmy Awards | 1996 | Outstanding Guest Actor in a Comedy Series | Larry Thomas (for "The Soup Nazi") | Nominated | |
| Primetime Creative Arts Emmy Awards | 1996 | Outstanding Casting for a Series | Marc Hirschfeld, Meg Liberman, Brian Myers | Nominated | |
| Primetime Creative Arts Emmy Awards | 1996 | Outstanding Multi-Camera Editing for a Series | Janet Ashikaga (for "The Rye") | Nominated | |
| Primetime Creative Arts Emmy Awards | 1996 | Outstanding Sound Mixing for a Comedy Series or a Special | Robert Douglass, Thomas J. Huth, Dana Mark McClure, David M. Weishaar (for "The Cadillac") | Nominated | |
| Primetime Creative Arts Emmy Awards | 1997 | Outstanding Guest Actor in a Comedy Series | Jerry Stiller | Nominated | |
| Primetime Creative Arts Emmy Awards | 1997 | Outstanding Casting for a Series | Marc Hirschfeld, Meg Liberman, Brian Myers | Nominated | |
| Primetime Creative Arts Emmy Awards | 1997 | Outstanding Multi-Camera Picture Editing for a Series | Skip Collector (for "The Pothole") | Nominated | |
| Primetime Creative Arts Emmy Awards | 1998 | Outstanding Guest Actor in a Comedy Series | Lloyd Bridges | Nominated | |
| Primetime Creative Arts Emmy Awards | 1998 | Outstanding Multi-Camera Picture Editing for a Series | Skip Collector (for "The Finale") | Nominated | |
| Producers Guild of America Awards | 1993 | Outstanding Producer of Television | | Nominated | |
| Producers Guild of America Awards | 1994 | Outstanding Producer of Television | | Nominated | |
| Producers Guild of America Awards | 1994 | Most Promising Producer in Television | Larry David, Jerry Seinfeld | Won | |
| Q Awards | 1992 | Best Actor in a Quality Comedy Series | Jerry Seinfeld | Nominated | |
| Q Awards | 1992 | Best Supporting Actress in a Quality Comedy Series | Julia Louis-Dreyfus | Won | |
| Q Awards | 1993 | Best Quality Comedy Series | Seinfeld | Nominated | |
| Q Awards | 1993 | Best Actor in a Quality Comedy Series | Jerry Seinfeld | Won | |
| Q Awards | 1993 | Best Supporting Actress in a Quality Comedy Series | Jason Alexander | Nominated | |
| Q Awards | 1993 | Best Supporting Actress in a Quality Comedy Series | Michael Richards | Nominated | |
| Q Awards | 1993 | Best Supporting Actress in a Quality Comedy Series | Julia Louis-Dreyfus | Won | |
| Q Awards | 1994 | Best Quality Comedy Series | Seinfeld | Nominated | |
| Q Awards | 1994 | Best Actor in a Quality Comedy Series | Jerry Seinfeld | Nominated | |
| Q Awards | 1994 | Best Supporting Actress in a Quality Comedy Series | Jason Alexander | Nominated | |
| Q Awards | 1994 | Best Supporting Actress in a Quality Comedy Series | Michael Richards | Nominated | |
| Q Awards | 1994 | Best Supporting Actress in a Quality Comedy Series | Julia Louis-Dreyfus | Won | |
| Q Awards | 1995 | Best Quality Comedy Series | Seinfeld | Nominated | |
| Q Awards | 1995 | Best Actor in a Quality Comedy Series | Jerry Seinfeld | Nominated | |
| Q Awards | 1995 | Best Supporting Actress in a Quality Comedy Series | Jason Alexander | Nominated | |
| Q Awards | 1995 | Best Supporting Actress in a Quality Comedy Series | Michael Richards | Nominated | |
| Q Awards | 1995 | Best Supporting Actress in a Quality Comedy Series | Julia Louis-Dreyfus | Nominated | |
| Q Awards | 1996 | Best Quality Comedy Series | Seinfeld | Nominated | |
| Q Awards | 1996 | Best Actor in a Quality Comedy Series | Jerry Seinfeld | Nominated | |
| Q Awards | 1997 | Best Quality Comedy Series | Seinfeld | Nominated | |
| Q Awards | 1997 | Best Actor in a Quality Comedy Series | Jerry Seinfeld | Nominated | |
| Q Awards | 1997 | Best Supporting Actress in a Quality Comedy Series | Jason Alexander | Nominated | |
| Q Awards | 1997 | Best Supporting Actress in a Quality Comedy Series | Michael Richards | Nominated | |
| Q Awards | 1997 | Best Supporting Actress in a Quality Comedy Series | Julia Louis-Dreyfus | Won | |
| Q Awards | 1998 | Best Quality Comedy Series | Seinfeld | Nominated | |
| Q Awards | 1998 | Best Recurring Player | Wayne Knight | Nominated | |
| Satellite Awards | 1997 | Best Television Series, Musical or Comedy | Seinfeld | Nominated | |
| Satellite Awards | 1997 | Best Actor in a Series, Musical or Comedy | Michael Richards | Nominated | |
| Satellite Awards | 2005 | Best DVD Release of TV Shows | Seinfeld: The Complete Sixth Season | Nominated | |
| TCA Awards | 1992 | Outstanding Achievement in Comedy | Seinfeld | Won | |
| TCA Awards | 1993 | Program of the Year | Seinfeld | Nominated | |
| TCA Awards | 1993 | Outstanding Achievement in Comedy | Seinfeld | Won | |
| TCA Awards | 1994 | Outstanding Achievement in Comedy | Seinfeld | Nominated | |
| TCA Awards | 1995 | Outstanding Achievement in Comedy | Seinfeld | Nominated | |
| TCA Awards | 1996 | Outstanding Achievement in Comedy | Seinfeld | Nominated | |
| TCA Awards | 1997 | Program of the Year | Seinfeld | Nominated | |
| TCA Awards | 1997 | Outstanding Achievement in Comedy | Seinfeld | Nominated | |
| TCA Awards | 1998 | Outstanding Achievement in Comedy | Seinfeld | Nominated | |
| TCA Awards | 1998 | Individual Achievement in Comedy | Jerry Seinfeld | Nominated | |
| TCA Awards | 1998 | Individual Achievement in Comedy | Michael Richards | Nominated | |
| TCA Awards | 2016 | Heritage Award | | Nominated | |
| TCA Awards | 2017 | Heritage Award | | Won | |
| TV Guide Awards | 1993 | Actor of the Year in a Comedy Series | Jerry Seinfeld | Won | |
| TV Guide Awards | 1993 | Actress of the Year in a Comedy Series | Julia Louis-Dreyfus | Won | |
| TV Guide Awards | 1993 | Supporting Actor of the Year in a Comedy Series | Jason Alexander | Nominated | |
| TV Guide Awards | 1993 | Supporting Actor of the Year in a Comedy Series | Michael Richards | Won | |
| TV Guide Awards | 1993 | Favorite Comedy Series | Seinfeld | Won | |
| TV Guide Awards | 1993 | Favorite TV Sidekick | Jason Alexander | Nominated | |
| TV Guide Awards | 1993 | Favorite Bromance | Jerry Seinfeld, Jason Alexander | Nominated | |
| TV Guide Awards | 1993 | Favorite Frenemies | Jerry Seinfeld, Wayne Knight | Nominated | |
| TV Guide Awards | 2013 | Favorite Classic TV | Seinfeld | Nominated | |
| TV Land Awards | 2003 | Most Amazing Cast Cross-Over | Seinfeld (Note: Featured Candice Bergen as Murphy Brown) | Nominated | |
| TV Land Awards | 2004 | Favorite Instrumental Theme Song | Seinfeld | Nominated | |
| TV Land Awards | 2004 | Favorite Greasy Spoon | Monk's Café | Nominated | |
| TV Land Awards | 2005 | Favorite Nosy Neighbor | Michael Richards | Nominated | |
| TV Land Awards | 2005 | Favorite Catch Phrase | "Yada, yada, yada" | Nominated | |
| TV Land Awards | 2006 | Most Happening Greasy Spoon or Hangout | Monk's Café | Nominated | |
| TV Land Awards | 2007 | Series Finale You Had a Party to Watch | Seinfeld | Nominated | |
| TV Land Awards | 2007 | Fake Product You Want to Buy | Bro / Manssiere | Nominated | |
| TV Land Awards | 2008 | TV House Most in Need of Ty Pennington | George's parents' house | Nominated | |
| Writers Guild of America Awards | 1991 | Television: Episodic Comedy | Larry David, Jerry Seinfeld (for "The Stake Out") | Nominated | |
| Writers Guild of America Awards | 1993 | Television: Episodic Comedy | Larry David, Jerry Seinfeld, Matt Goldman (for "The Stranded") | Nominated | |
| Writers Guild of America Awards | 1993 | Television: Episodic Comedy | Larry David, Larry Levin (for "The Boyfriend") | Nominated | |
| Writers Guild of America Awards | 1993 | Television: Episodic Comedy | Larry David, Greg Daniels (for "The Parking Space") | Nominated | |
| Writers Guild of America Awards | 1994 | Television: Episodic Comedy | Larry David (for "The Contest") | Won | |
| Writers Guild of America Awards | 1994 | Television: Episodic Comedy | Larry Charles (for "The Outing") | Nominated | |
| Writers Guild of America Awards | 1995 | Television: Episodic Comedy | Lawrence H. Levy, Larry David (for "The Mango") | Won | |
| Writers Guild of America Awards | 1995 | Television: Episodic Comedy | Peter Mehlman, Carol Leifer (for "The Hamptons") | Nominated | |
| Writers Guild of America Awards | 1997 | Television: Episodic Comedy | Spike Feresten (for "The Soup Nazi") | Nominated | |
| Writers Guild of America Awards | 1997 | Television: Episodic Comedy | David Mandel (for "The Pool Guy") | Won | |
| Writers Guild of America Awards | 1997 | Television: Episodic Comedy | Peter Mehlman (for "The Sponge") | Nominated | |
| Writers Guild of America Awards | 1998 | Television: Episodic Comedy | David Mandel (for "The Bizarro Jerry") | Nominated | |
| Writers Guild of America Awards | 1998 | Television: Episodic Comedy | Gregg Kavet, Andy Robin (for "The Fatigues") | Won | |
| Writers Guild of America Awards | 1998 | Television: Episodic Comedy | Alec Berg, Jeff Schaffer (for "The Chicken Roaster") | Nominated | |
