= Seinfeld season 5 =

Seinfeld
- Season 5
- DVD cover
- Showrunner: Larry David
- Starring: Jerry Seinfeld; Julia Louis-Dreyfus; Michael Richards; Jason Alexander
- No. of episodes: 22

Release
- Original network: NBC
- Original release: September 16, 1993 – May 19, 1994

Season chronology
- ← Previous; Season 4 Next → Season 6

The fifth season of Seinfeld, an American comedy television series created by Jerry Seinfeld and Larry David, began airing on September 16, 1993, and concluded on May 19, 1994, on NBC. This marked the first season Seinfeld occupied the 9 PM Thursday prime-time slot, following the end of the run by Cheers in this time slot the previous season.

== Production ==
Seinfeld was produced by Castle Rock Entertainment and aired on NBC in the United States. The executive producers were Larry David, George Shapiro, and Howard West with Tom Gammill and Max Pross as supervising producers. Bruce Kirschbaum was the executive consultant. This season was the last to be directed by Tom Cherones.

The series was set predominantly in an apartment block on New York City's Upper West Side; however, the fifth season was shot and mostly filmed in CBS Studio Center in Studio City, California. The show features Jerry Seinfeld as himself, and a host of Jerry's friends and acquaintances, which include George Costanza, Elaine Benes, and Kramer, portrayed by Jason Alexander, Julia Louis-Dreyfus and Michael Richards, respectively.

== Reception ==
=== Critical reception ===
The review aggregator website Rotten Tomatoes reported a 100% approval rating with an average rating of 10/10, based on 8 critic reviews.

=== Awards ===
Season five received 12 Emmy nominations and won two. Michael Richards won his second of three Emmys for Outstanding Supporting Actor in a Comedy Series. Janet Ashikaga won the Emmy for Outstanding Individual Achievement in Editing for a Series for the episode "The Opposite". Jerry Seinfeld was nominated for Outstanding Lead Actor in a Comedy Series. Jason Alexander was nominated for Outstanding Supporting Actor in a Comedy Series, losing to co-star Michael Richards. Julia Louis-Dreyfus was nominated for Outstanding Supporting Actress in a Comedy Series. Marlee Matlin was nominated for Outstanding Guest Actress in a Comedy Series for playing Laura in the episode "The Lip Reader". Judge Reinhold was nominated for Outstanding Guest Actor in a Comedy Series for playing Aaron for the episodes "The Raincoats (part 1 and 2)". The episode "The Mango" was nominated for two Emmys: Outstanding Writing in a Comedy Series (Lawrence H. Levy and Larry David), and Outstanding Directing in a Comedy Series (Tom Cherones). Larry David was also nominated for Outstanding Writing in a Comedy Series for the episode "The Puffy Shirt". Seinfeld was also nominated for Outstanding Sound Mixing in a Comedy Series or Special for the episode "The Bris". It was also nominated for Outstanding Comedy Series again, but lost to Frasier. Seinfeld was also nominated for four Golden Globe Awards and won three of them: Best Performance by an Actor in TV series-comedy (Jerry Seinfeld), Best Performance by an Actress in a Supporting Role in a Series, Mini-Series or Motion Picture Made for TV (Julia Louis- Dreyfus), and Best TV series-comedy/musical. Jason Alexander was nominated for Best Performance by an Actor in a Supporting Role in a Series, Mini-Series or Motion Picture Made for TV. This season was also nominated for Directors Guild of America (Tom Cherones) for "The Mango", and won a Writers Guild of America Award (Lawrence H. Levy and Larry David) for "The Mango".

=== Nielsen ratings ===
Season five placed #3 in the Nielsen ratings below Home Improvement and 60 Minutes.

== Episodes ==
No. overall	No. in season	Title	Directed by	Written by	Original release date	Prod. code	US viewers (millions)
65	1	"The Mango"	Tom Cherones	Story by : Lawrence H. Levy; Teleplay by : Lawrence H. Levy and Larry David	September 16, 1993	501	28.2
Elaine admits that she got away with faking all her orgasms with Jerry. George, already insecure about his sexual performance, fails to get an erection with his girlfriend Karen. The rude awakening also hangs over Jerry, and he and Elaine fall out because she will not give him "another shot" to prove himself. Kramer gets banned from Joe's (Leonard Termo) grocery for demanding a refund for a bad peach, but, refusing fruit from anywhere else, ropes Jerry and George into shopping for him. They buy a mango so delicious that it can revive lost erections.
66	2	"The Puffy Shirt"	Tom Cherones	Larry David	September 23, 1993	503	29.5
George is broke and must move back home with his deranged parents, but gets scouted as a hand model by dumb luck, and becomes a prima donna. Jerry and Elaine meet Kramer's fashion designer and "low talker" girlfriend Leslie. Nodding along to Leslie's inaudible conversation, Jerry unwittingly agrees to promote her puffy stereotypical pirate shirt, by wearing it on The Today Show while helping Elaine promote a Goodwill benefit. Jerry fumes as he becomes the butt of many pirate jokes.
67	3	"The Glasses"	Tom Cherones	Tom Gammill & Max Pross	September 30, 1993	502	28.7
Kramer hooks up Jerry with a discounted air conditioner, and sends George to an optometrist for a discount to replace his lost glasses. While there, Elaine gets bitten by a dog, while George, without glasses, reports seeing Jerry's girlfriend Amy making out with Cousin Jeffrey. Kramer squeezes his connection, Dwayne, for the discount by threatening to make him relapse into a wretched candy addiction. Jerry does not know whether to trust Amy or George's uncanny squinting eyesight; Elaine exhibits rabies symptoms; and George realizes too late that he bought women's glasses.
68	4	"The Sniffing Accountant"	Tom Cherones	Larry David & Jerry Seinfeld	October 7, 1993	504	28.4
Barry, an accountant who is managing Jerry, Kramer, and Newman's money, habitually sniffs at seemingly nothing. The three suspect that Barry is funding a cocaine habit with their money, and go undercover to catch Barry red-handed in a sting operation. Elaine falls for writer Jake Jarmel, a perfect boyfriend, but nitpicks his failure to use exclamation points while writing down an answering machine message. George's father sets him up with an interview for a bra salesman job. Everyone experiences, first-hand, when they should not "feel material" of the clothing of strangers.
69	5	"The Bris"	Tom Cherones	Larry Charles	October 14, 1993	505	28.7
While seeing their friends' new baby, Jerry and Elaine get picked as the godparents. George finds the perfect parking spot, but a suicidal jumper lands on his car, leaving the roof cratered. Kramer believes the hospital has created a "half-pig, half-man" mutant, and plots to break the pig-man out of custody. Elaine and Jerry are unenthusiastic about their duties to help with the baby's bris, where Kramer tries to stop the baby's circumcision, while Jerry gets his finger "circumcised" by a high-strung mohel that Elaine hired.
70	6	"The Lip Reader"	Tom Cherones	Carol Leifer	October 28, 1993	506	31.0
After George's messy eating at the US Open is televised, George's girlfriend Gwen breaks up with him, but will not say why. Jerry starts dating a deaf lineswoman (Marlee Matlin), Laura, who helps Kramer get hired as a ball boy despite him being an adult. Elaine fakes deafness to shut up an overly talkative livery driver, but gets caught out and tries to make amends. George recruits Laura to read Gwen's lips at a party to find out why he got dumped, but then must rely on Kramer's rusty sign language skills to relay Laura's lip-reading.
71	7	"The Non-Fat Yogurt"	Tom Cherones	Larry David	November 4, 1993	507	31.1
Jerry drops an F-bomb in praise of a popular "non-fat" yogurt shop, accidentally teaching the owner's young son to swear. Everyone gains weight after eating without guilt, and a lab analysis finds fat in the yogurt. Lloyd Braun, from George's old neighborhood, is advising mayor David Dinkins's reelection campaign; George passes off his mockery of Lloyd as a muscle spasm, and gets referred to see Dinkins's doctor. While dating Lloyd, Elaine dreams up a citywide name tag policy that gets borrowed for Dinkins's platform. Mayoral challenger Rudy Giuliani falls victim to an unhealthy eating scandal, making "falsified non-fat yogurt" the defining issue of the election.
72	8	"The Barber"	Tom Cherones	Andy Robin	November 11, 1993	508	29.7
After a favorable job interview that gets interrupted, George does not know if he is hired; he decides to pass himself off as hired while the interviewer is out, and settles into the office while doing nothing each day. Jerry has put up with an unsatisfactory barber, Enzo, for twelve years out of loyalty, but Elaine needs him to get a good haircut for once for a bachelor auction for charity. Kramer sends Jerry to Enzo's nephew Gino, but Enzo is so possessive that Jerry can only get an appointment behind his back. Suspecting Jerry's disloyalty, Enzo sends Newman as a spy to prove Jerry's guilt.
73	9	"The Masseuse"	Tom Cherones	Peter Mehlman	November 18, 1993	509	27.7
George is adored by his own girlfriend Karen and loathed by Jerry's girlfriend Jodi at the same time, and labors in vain to earn Jodi's approval while neglecting Karen. Jodi, a masseuse, passes over Jerry while offering her services to everyone else, even though Jerry wants a massage from her more than sex. Elaine's boyfriend's attractive qualities are overshadowed by him sharing a name with serial killer Joel Rifkin, and she tries to nudge him to change his name. Kramer's pleasure at Jodi's hands drives Jerry green with envy until he resolves to get a massage non-consensually.
74	10	"The Cigar Store Indian"	Tom Cherones	Tom Gammill & Max Pross	December 9, 1993	510	29.6
George makes Jerry drive him to refinish his parents' coffee table; as a result, George impresses a woman who does not know he lives with his parents, Jerry buys Elaine a cigar store Indian, and Kramer wants to pitch a coffee table book about coffee tables to Elaine's company. Jerry's kitschy gift starts him off on the wrong foot with Elaine's friend Winona, a Native American, and he must catch his own cultural insensitivity at every turn while dating her. Elaine takes Frank Costanza's issue of TV Guide, rendering his collection incomplete, and causing a TV Guide enthusiast to fall for her.
75	11	"The Conversion"	Tom Cherones	Bruce Kirschbaum	December 16, 1993	511	28.3
George's girlfriend accepts his joblessness and living with his parents, but she is not allowed to date outside the Latvian Orthodox faith. George decides to convert to her religion, and must study religious texts and receive benedictions behind his parents' back. Kramer inadvertently charms a female novice, who questions her faith; he is warned that he possesses a power over women called kavorka, and goes to desperate lengths to dispel it. Jerry belittles Elaine's podiatrist boyfriend as not a proper doctor, but then needs the podiatrist's help to explain some fungicide he found in his girlfriend's medicine cabinet.
76	12	"The Stall"	Tom Cherones	Larry Charles	January 6, 1994	512	35.0
Elaine gets trapped in a bathroom stall without toilet paper, and a woman in the next stall will not spare any for her. Elaine only knows the other woman by voice, but Jerry realizes that this was his girlfriend Jane, and must keep Elaine from recognizing Jane's voice. Kramer prank calls a phone sex operator, "Erica", but he and Jerry suspect "Erica"'s voice is Jane's. Elaine is dating an airheaded hunk, Tony, but denies that she only cares about his looks. Her devotion to Tony is put to the test when George, who has become Tony's groupie, makes him fall and injure his face while rock-climbing.
77	13	"The Dinner Party"	Tom Cherones	Larry David	February 3, 1994	514	33.0
On a very cold day, everyone goes to buy gifts before a dinner party. Elaine and Jerry go to a bakery for a cake, but they make enemies of fellow party guests while vying for the last chocolate babka. George and Kramer go to buy wine, and George is forced to patronize a newsstand to make change. Jerry cannot stomach a cake with a single hair on it, then throws up from eating a black-and-white cookie down the middle. Kramer's car gets double-parked in, leaving him waiting in the cold for hours with neither a coat nor heating in his car. As night falls, the four are still no closer to leaving for the party.
78	14	"The Marine Biologist"	Tom Cherones	Ron Hauge & Charlie Rubin	February 10, 1994	513	35.0
Jerry hooks up George with Diane—the popular girl from their class in college—by telling her he became a marine biologist, forcing George to reluctantly play along. After struggling to hit long drives at a beach, Kramer is tormented by sand in his clothes. Elaine escorts renowned Russian author Yuri Testikov in a limousine for work, but Testikov throws Elaine's noisy electronic organizer away, injuring a woman. The victim holds the organizer hostage to demand compensation, and Elaine schemes to make Testikov take responsibility. George wants to come clean with Diane, only to get recruited as a marine biologist to help save a beached whale.
79	15	"The Pie"	Tom Cherones	Tom Gammill & Max Pross	February 17, 1994	515	25.4
Jerry's girlfriend Audrey gives no reason for adamantly refusing to try some apple pie. Elaine discovers a mannequin with her own face at a downtown store, and racks her brain to identify its creator. George finds a perfectly-fitting suit for a job interview, but must wait for an upcoming sale, pitting him against another short, bald customer. Jerry also gets served a pie he must refuse when Audrey's restaurateur father Poppie makes Jerry a pizza without washing his hands in the bathroom. Kramer starts dating a long-nailed cashier to relieve his back itch, but must "let her down easy" when the itch stops.
80	16	"The Stand-In"	Tom Cherones	Larry David	February 24, 1994	516	25.4
George is hopelessly bored by his girlfriend, but mutual friend Al Netche warns her about George's fear of commitment, so George commits to her out of spite. Jerry tries to cheer up a morosely hospitalized friend, Fulton, but takes his task too seriously. Kramer's friend Mickey Abbott, a little person, is a stand-in for a child actor, but Kramer pressures Mickey to commit taboo "heightening" to keep up with the child's height, causing intrigue amongst the little person community on set. Jerry vouches for his friend Phil Totola to Elaine, but they are unprepared for Phil leaving his genitals out for no reason during a date.
81	17	"The Wife"	Tom Cherones	Peter Mehlman	March 17, 1994	517	30.7
Jerry gets a dry-cleaning discount that extends to family members, inspiring him and his girlfriend Meryl (Courteney Cox) to amorously roleplay as husband and wife. Elaine is intrigued by mixed romantic signals from a health club member, Greg, but she is caught between her pursuit of Greg and Greg's threat to expel George from the club for urinating in a shower. Kramer gets his quilt dry cleaned, leaving him sleep-deprived and pale just as he needs to meet his black girlfriend's family. Jerry regrets rushing into a pretend marriage too soon, and adulterously gives his discount to another woman.
82	18	"The Raincoats"	Tom Cherones	Tom Gammill & Max Pross and Larry David & Jerry Seinfeld	April 28, 1994	519	29.6
83	19	"The Raincoats"	Tom Cherones	Tom Gammill & Max Pross and Larry David & Jerry Seinfeld	April 28, 1994	520	29.6
Longing to have his girlfriend Rachel over after weeks apart, Jerry counts the days until his visiting parents leave for Paris. George takes offense on his parents' behalf when Jerry's parents repeatedly blow off their dinner invitation. Elaine's boyfriend, an overly "close talker", devotes himself to providing hospitality for Jerry's parents despite being total strangers. Kramer partners with Morty to offload his unsold stock of vintage raincoats at Rudy's, but Morty's elaborate plan to ship the raincoats from Florida jeopardizes the Paris trip. George sells his father's old clothes behind his back to Rudy, not knowing that they are moth-infested, just when Frank needs his "cabana wear" to take a cruise. Starved for time alone together, Jerry and Rachel cannot resist making out during Schindler's List at the theater, inadvertently giving Newman dirt to use against Jerry. George fakes a Paris trip to get out of mentoring young Joey for Big Brother, but instead gets roped into taking Joey to Paris using the Seinfelds' forfeited tickets.
84	20	"The Fire"	Tom Cherones	Larry Charles	May 5, 1994	518	27.6
At his girlfriend's young son's birthday party, George shoves aside women, children, and the elderly to save himself from a small fire. Elaine's coworker, Toby, overwhelms Elaine with her relentless enthusiasm for Kramer's book, and sabotages Jerry's show by heckling him to "express herself". Jerry gets bad press from a notable magazine critic, and takes revenge on behalf of all comedians by heckling Toby in return. Fleeing in distress, Toby loses her pinky toe in an accident; Kramer has a heroic adventure saving her lost toe, inspiring George to vow to turn over a new leaf.
85	21	"The Hamptons"	Tom Cherones	Peter Mehlman & Carol Leifer	May 12, 1994	522	24.5
Everyone goes to a Hamptons beach house to see their friends' new baby. George expects to have sex with his girlfriend Jane for the first time, but everyone else sees Jane topless before he gets to. Rachel sees George's shrunken penis after a swim, and gossips to Jane, while George realizes in horror that women do not know about "shrinkage". Kramer treats everyone to stolen lobster from a fisherman's trap, outraging their host, and tempting Rachel to violate her kosher diet. The guests are revolted by the ugly baby, but the family pediatrician delivers the same compliment to Elaine and the baby alike.
86	22	"The Opposite"	Tom Cherones	Andy Cowan and Larry David & Jerry Seinfeld	May 19, 1994	521	30.1
Declaring that every decision in his life has been wrong, George resolves to follow the opposite of his instincts. As a result, he meets a woman and fascinates her by becoming a forthright and upstanding man. Elaine's winning streak comes to an end when Jake Jarmel breaks up with her for putting a bag of Jujyfruits before his wellbeing. Jerry discovers that every misfortune in his life evens itself out, and stops worrying entirely. Kramer torpedoes his own book tour when he spits up a mouthful of coffee on Kathie Lee Gifford on live TV. George gets hired by the New York Yankees, and finally moves out of his parents' house.
