= The Mango =

- Seinfeld episode
- Episode no.: Season 5 Episode 1
- Directed by: Tom Cherones
- Story by: Lawrence H. Levy
- Teleplay by: Larry David and Lawrence H. Levy
- Production code: 501
- Original air date: September 16, 1993

Guest appearances
- Lisa Edelstein as Karen; Leonard Termo as Joe; Veralyn Jones as Renee

Episode chronology
← Previous "The Pilot"	Next → "The Puffy Shirt"

"The Mango" is the 65th episode of the NBC sitcom Seinfeld. It aired on September 16, 1993, and is the premiere of the show's fifth season. In this episode, Jerry gets defensive after Elaine admits to having faked all her orgasms with him. George's insecurity over sexual performance becomes a self-fulfilling prophecy. Kramer's high standards for fruit gets him banned from the only grocer where he will buy fruit.

== Plot ==
Jerry confirms that George is in love because he is scrubbing his bathroom for his girlfriend Karen. George is insecure about his sexual performance, but is sure he could tell if she was faking an orgasm. Elaine admits to getting away with faking back when she was not having orgasms, including "all the time" when she was with Jerry.

This rude awakening hangs over Jerry, and he nearly backs out of dinner with Elaine. Kramer does not take this seriously, having also faked before. He is far more concerned when he bites into a bad peach, which he takes back to Joe's, the local grocer. Joe denies him a refund, dismissing the peach as an "act of God" and banning Kramer from the store.

George and Jerry both feel inadequate as they watch Karen and Elaine orgasmically savor their food. When Elaine admires Meryl Streep's "authenticity" in a new movie, Jerry reaches his breaking point and cajoles Elaine to give him "another shot" to prove himself, even for half an hour. Elaine insists that sex will ruin their friendship, and Jerry sulks. George is crestfallen and blames Jerry when he fails to get an erection with Karen, and Jerry and Elaine continue to bicker after Jerry walks out of the movie.

George is not consoled to learn that even Houdini supposedly suffered erectile dysfunction, while Jerry polls many old girlfriends about orgasms to spite Elaine. Kramer, repulsed by supermarket fruit, drags Jerry to Joe's to buy fruit for him. Jerry is also banned when Joe easily recognizes Kramer's finicky fruit shopping list, like "plums with red on the inside". Kramer and Jerry enlist George to buy fruit for them both, but neither has cash to pay him back.

Kramer pushes a mango on George, which is so delicious as to revive his erection, just in time for another date with Karen. Elaine and Jerry resentfully give back each other's things. Realizing that only sex can save their friendship now, Elaine grants Jerry his half-hour.

George's sexual performance immensely pleasures Karen, but he assumes she was faking, and she throws him out. Jerry fails to get an erection and blames George, but is reminded that there is more mango left.

== Production ==
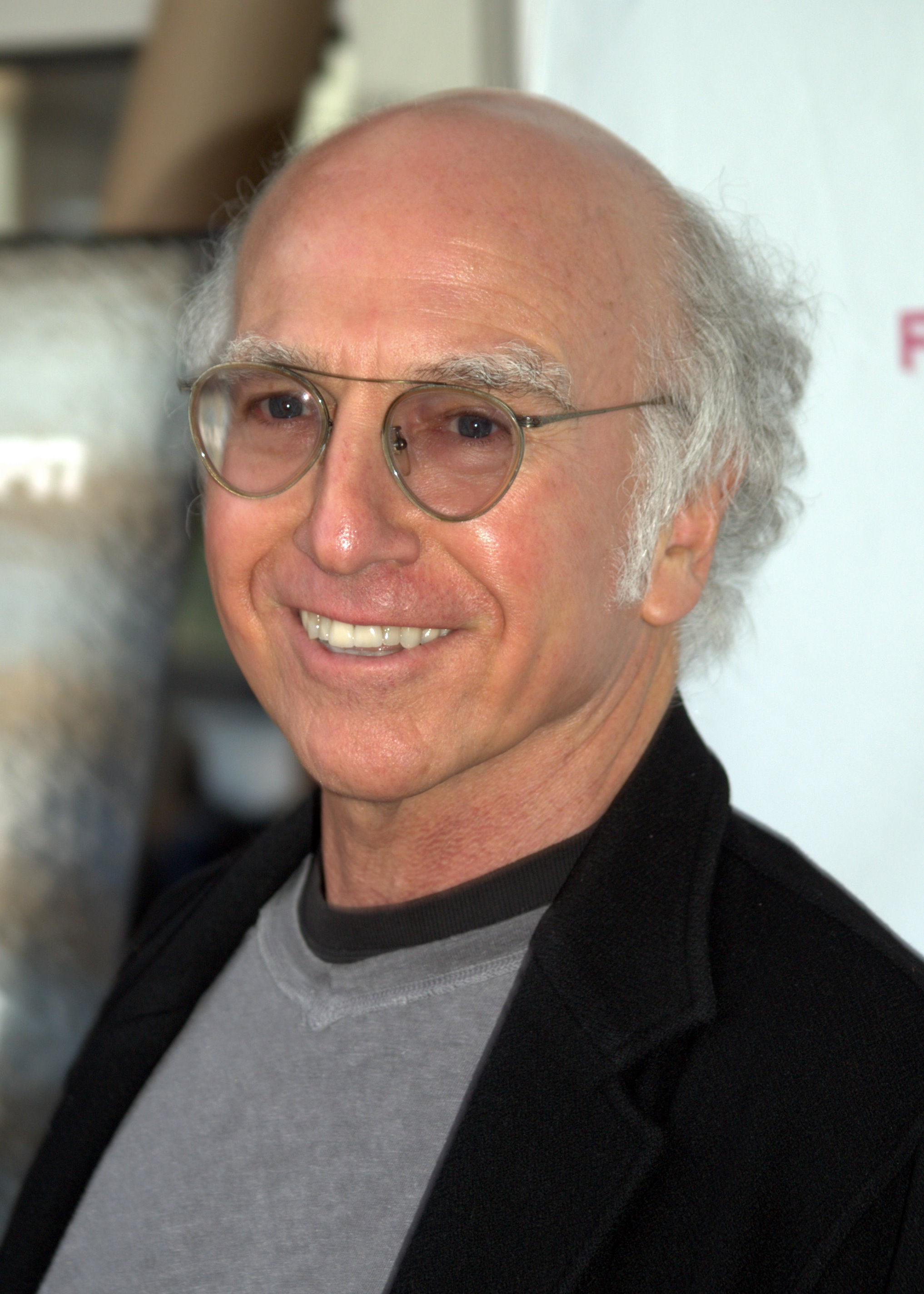
Larry David used the pseudonym "Buck Dancer" for this episode when credited.

"The Mango" was written by Larry David and Lawrence H. Levy. A friend of his came up with the setup of the episode: Elaine never having orgasms with Jerry. Larry David said that the idea was "too good to pass up." The subplot in which Kramer is banned from a fruit shop is based on one of David’s personal experiences, where he himself was banned from a fruit shop for squeezing the produce too much.

The episode's working title was "The Orgasm." It was first read by its cast on August 11, 1993 to much anticipation, as it was to premiere in a new 9:00 timeslot. NBC officials, however, were a bit more apprehensive because it was taking over the timeslot of the highly successful sitcom Cheers. The episode was filmed in front of a live studio audience on Tuesday, August 17, 1993.

The exterior shot of Joe’s fruit shop was filmed on the backlot of CBS Studio center. The name "Almo's Bar & Grill" is visible on the storefront next door to Joe’s. This is a reference to the father of Seinfeld set designer Tom Azzari, whose name is Almo.

== Reception ==
This episode gained a Nielsen rating of 19.3 and an audience share of 29, meaning that 19.3% of American households watched the episode, and 29% of all televisions in use at the time were tuned into it.

=== Awards and nominations ===
The Mango received the following awards/nominations:

- 1994 Primetime Emmy Award for Outstanding Individual Achievement in Writing in a Comedy Series nomination: Larry David and Lawrence H. Levy.
- 1994 Primetime Emmy Award for Outstanding Individual Achievement in Directing in a Comedy Series nomination: Tom Cherones.
- 1993 Directors Guild of America Award for Outstanding Directorial Achievement in a Comedy Series nomination: Tom Cherones.
- 1995 Writers Guild Award for an Episodic Comedy: Larry David and Lawrence H. Levy.
