= Kathryn Kates =

American actress (1948–2022)

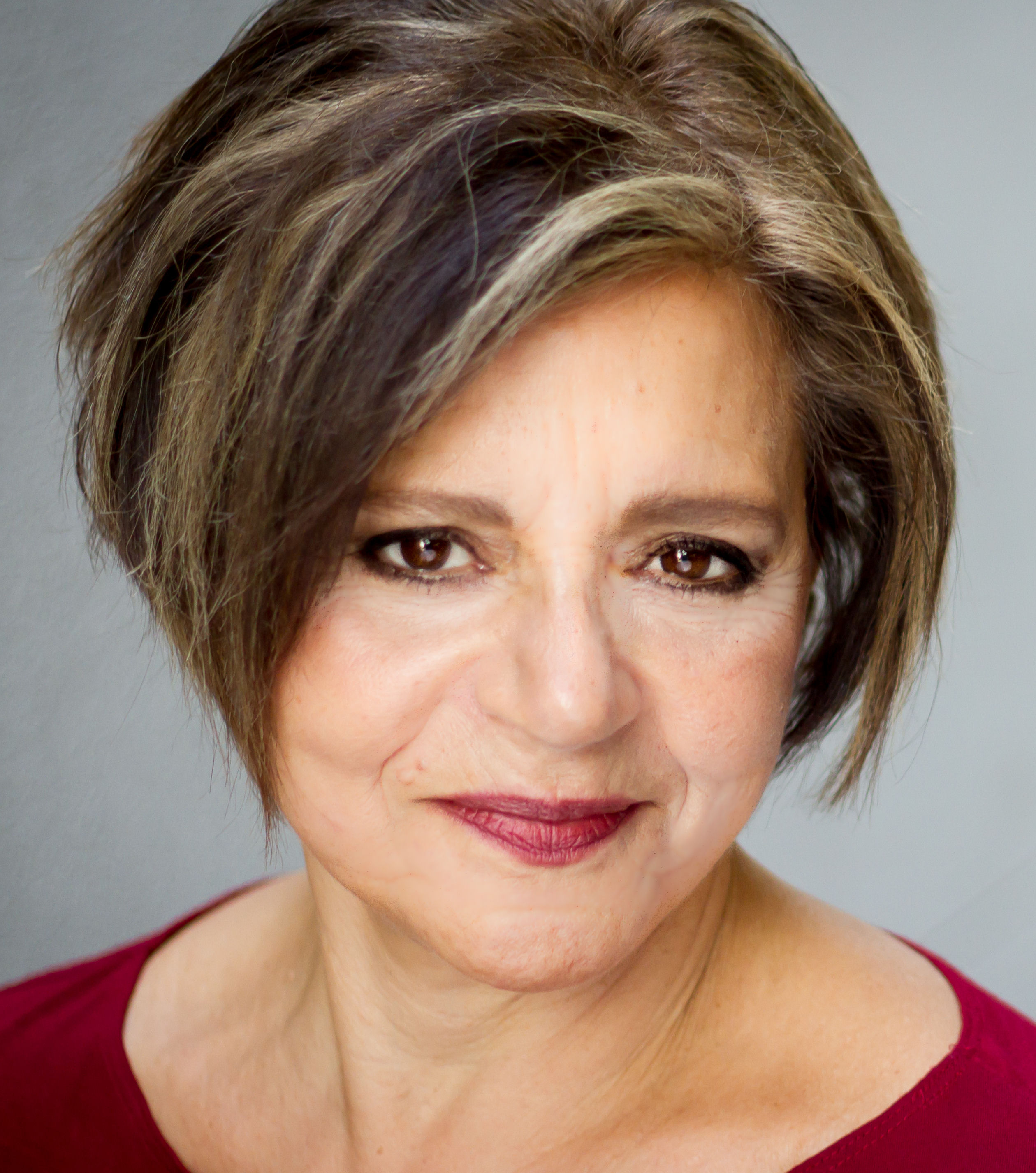
- Kates in 2014
- Born: January 29, 1948; Queens, New York City, U.S.
- Died: January 22, 2022 (aged 73); Lake Worth, Florida, U.S.
- Occupation: Actress
- Years active: 1974–2022
- Television: Seinfeld

Kathryn Jane Kates (January 29, 1948 – January 22, 2022) was an American actress. She was known for appearances on Seinfeld in the episodes "The Rye" and "The Dinner Party." She also appeared in Law & Order: Special Victims Unit, Orange Is the New Black, The Many Saints of Newark among other roles in television and film. Kates also has many off-Broadway credits.

== Early life and career ==
Kathryn Jane Kates was born in New York City on January 29, 1948. Her father, Louis Kates, was an electronics engineer. Her mother, Sylvia Kates, was an actress who worked under the stage name Madelyn Cates. Kathryn Kates graduated from Great Neck North Senior High School in 1967. She graduated from Tisch School of the arts at New York University in 1971. Ms. Kates moved to Los Angeles in 1974 where she began her acting career. She is one of 25 actors who are founding members of The Colony Theatre, at The Studio Theatre in the Silver Lake district of Los Angeles. Kates, was co-general manager with Barbara Beckley of The Colony from 1975 to 1981. Kates and Beckley produced all of the company's plays during those years. Kathryn Kates played opposite John Larroquette as his mother, lover, and wife: as his mother in Enter Laughing (Cast Theatre, 1974); as his wife in A Company of Wayward Saints (Colony Theatre 1978); and as his lover in The Lady's Not For Burning (Colony Theatre, 1979). Kates also appeared in many of The Colony Theater's L.A. Drama Critics' Circle award-winning productions such as The Grapes of Wrath and The Martian Chronicles.

== Later career ==
One of Kates's most memorable roles was her recurring appearance on Seinfeld as The Counter Woman in the episodes "The Dinner Party" (1994) and "The Rye" (1996). Other recurring roles have been on the Disney series Lizzie McGuire as Mrs. Carrabino ("You're a Good Man, Lizzie McGuire", 2002 and "My Fair Larry", 2003), on Pam Am (2011) as Mrs. Luckovich, as June Starr in Judging Amy (2003), as Ginny in Caroline in the City, as Mrs. Bowman in Hudson Street (1996), and as Mable Maloney in a two-part Matlock, "The Witness Killings" (1991). Kates had a recurring role in the Orange Is the New Black. She was a series lead in the CBS/Showtime pilot Gurland on Gurland, playing Myrna Birnbaum. She also appeared in Reggie Rock Bythewood's pilot for the BET network, Gun Hill, as Bora.

Kates worked in film, for director Daryl Wein in Lola Versus, and for Paul Moshe Mones in Dovid Moyer as Odel, the Orthodox cook. She also worked with Don Siegel (in Jinxed!,) and Lamont Johnson in the television movie Life of The Party: The Story of Beatrice (1982). She won the Drama Logue Award for best actress for her role as Ruby in Marsha Norman's Getting Out (1982), and in 2010 received a Best Supporting Actress nomination from the MITF in NYC for her work in Gray Matters as the high-powered agent, Miriam Berger (2010).

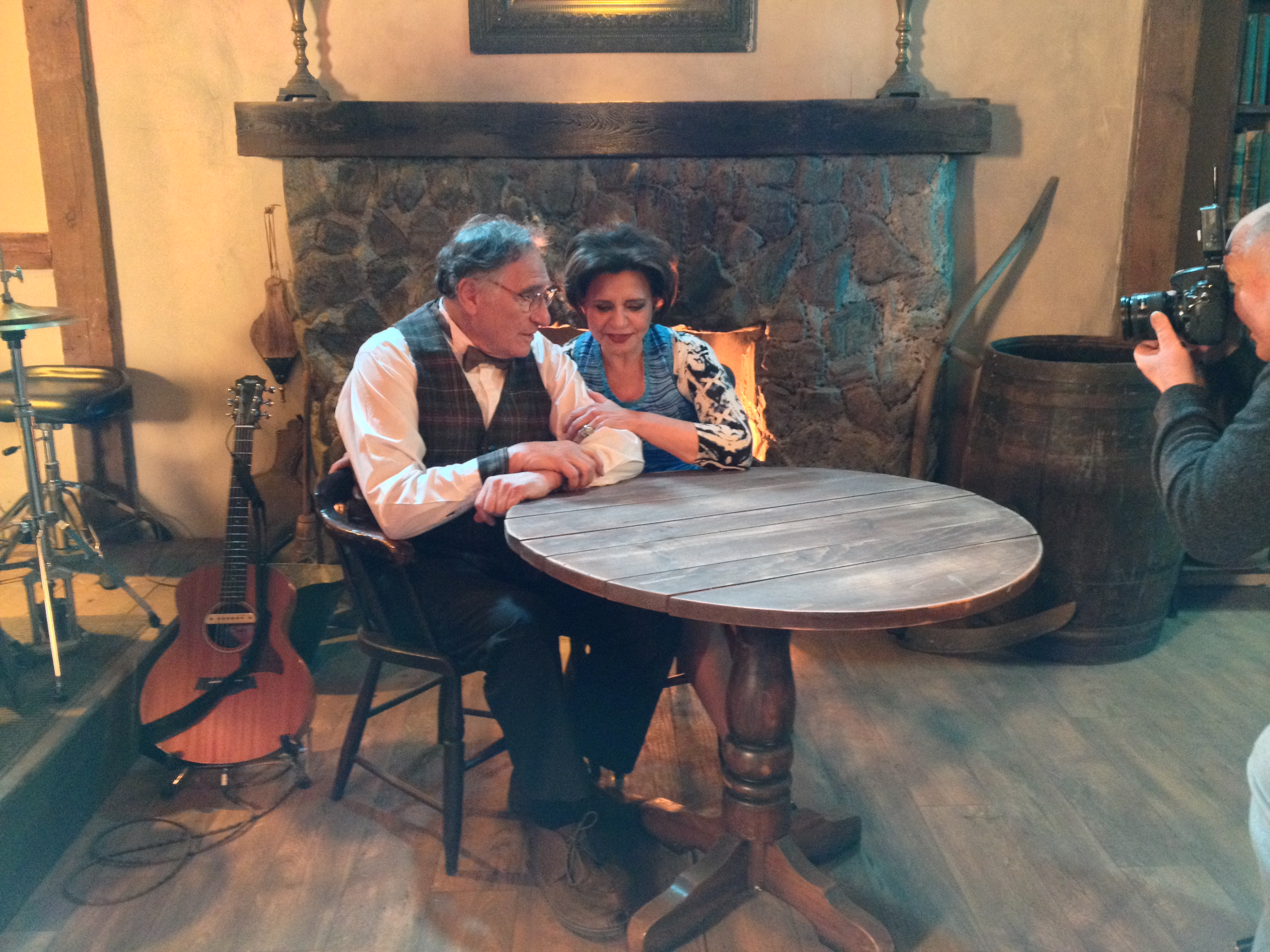
Kates with Judd Hirsch in Small Miracles.

After relocating to New York City in 2006, Kates appeared in over twenty off- and off-off-Broadway productions, and toured Europe (Bucharest, Sibiu and Stockholm) with Saviana Stanescu's Waxing West, She was the Palestinian Aunt in the New York Theatre Workshop production of Food and Fadwa, on Theatre Row in Herman Kline's Midlife Crisis, and, more recently starred along with Greg Mullavey and Gaby Hoffmann in The Last Seder. She was a company member of Daniel Talbott's Rising Phoenix Rep.

== Death ==
Kates died of lung cancer at her brother's home in Lake Worth, Florida on January 22, 2022, a week short of turning 74.

== Filmography ==
Film and television credits
Year	Title	Role	Notes
1982	Life of the Party: The Story of Beatrice	Diedre	TV movie - with Carol Burnett
1982	Jinxed!	Miss Nina	Film - with Bette Midler
1983	The Taming of the Shrew	Player 4	Video
1990	Pastime	Ethel	Film
1991	Matlock	Mabel Maloney	Recurring role; 2 episodes
1991	Teenage Exorcist	Maid	Film
1992	Rachel Gunn, R.N.		Episode: "Love Is Here to Stray"
1994	Thunder Alley	Nurse #1	Episode: "Never Say Die"
1994–1996	Seinfeld	Counter Woman	Episodes: "The Dinner Party", "The Rye"
1996	Hudson Street	Mrs. Bowman	Episode: "Having My Baby"
1997	The Nurse	Marsha Harriman	Film
1997	Asylum	Nurse Taylor	Film
1998	Caroline in the City	Ginny	Episode: "Caroline and the Little White Lies"
2002–2003	Lizzie McGuire	Mrs. Carrabino	2 episodes
2003	Judging Amy	June Starr	Episode: "Into The Fire"
2003	10-8: Officers on Duty	Mrs. Berman	Episode: "The Wild Bunch"; uncredited
2008	Saveta's Gift	Looba	Short film
2009	Check-Up: From the Gently Twisted Life of Michael Kleinfeld	Susan Kleinfeld	Short film
2009	Out of the Fog	Ludmilla Bashilevsky	Film
2009	Lott Oh	Gertrude	Short film
2010	Rescue Me	Older Woman	Episode: "Sanctuary"
2011	Monkey Man	Mrs. Howard	Film
2011	Pan Am	Mrs. Luckovich	Episode: "Truth or Dare"
2011	Gun Hill	Bora	TV movie
2012	Lola Versus	Woman at Restaurant	Film
2013–2019	Orange Is the New Black	Amy Kanter-Bloom	4 episodes
2014	Unforgettable	Mary Garroto	Episode: "Manhunt"
2016	Feed the Beast	Ruth Cline	2 episodes
2016–2017	Shades of Blue	Mrs. Saperstein	5 episodes
2017–2020	Law & Order: Special Victims Unit	Judge Marlene Simons	5 episodes
2019	Friends from College	Martha	2 episodes
2019	The Jesus Rolls	Older Woman	Film
2020	Hunters	Hilda Hoffman	Episode: "The Mourner's Kaddish"
2020	The Good Fight	Amelia Diamond	Episode: "The Gang Discovers Who Killed Jeffrey Epstein"
2021	The Many Saints of Newark	Angie DeCarlo	Film
2023	Extrapolations	Mrs. Goldblatt	1 episode; posthumous release
