= The Dinner Party (Seinfeld) =

- Seinfeld episode
- Episode no.: Season 5 Episode 13
- Directed by: Tom Cherones
- Written by: Larry David
- Production code: 514
- Original air date: February 3, 1994

Guest appearances
- Fred Pinkard as Newsstand Guy; Frank Novak as Clerk; Mark Holton as David; Suzy Soro as Barbara; Kathryn Kates as Counterwoman; Langdon Bensing as Man on Street; Sayed Badreya as Foreign Man; Amjad J. Qaisen as Hussein; Roger Eschbacher as Man with Cane; Larry David as Hussein (voice, uncredited)

Episode chronology
← Previous "The Stall"	Next → "The Marine Biologist"
- Seinfeld season 5

"The Dinner Party" is the 77th episode of the NBC sitcom Seinfeld. This is the 13th episode of the fifth season, and first aired on February 3, 1994. The episode follows the cast's struggles to pick up gifts before a dinner party.

== Plot ==
On a very cold day, Jerry, Elaine, George, and Kramer go to a dinner party. George's new Gore-Tex winter coat is so puffy and overstuffed that he can only fit in Kramer's car, which has no heating. As they head to pick up wine and cake, George protests that invitations come with strings attached, then suggests that soda and junk food would be more appreciated.

Elaine and Jerry get dropped off at a bakery, where Elaine eyes the specialty, chocolate babka. Having forgotten to take a number to get in line, they demand that two other customers give up their number, but then realize they are picking a fight with fellow party guests. Unsympathetic, the other guests get the last chocolate babka, and head to the party victoriously to tell everyone what happened.

Kramer and George manage to park at a liquor store without resorting to double parking. George is forced to pay because Kramer never carries a wallet, or money, but the clerk will not break George's $100 bill. A newsstand man demands George buy several things before he will make change. Kramer throws in a candy bar and a Penthouse Forum for himself, insisting that the scandalous reader letters are all real.

Elaine settles for the "lesser" cinnamon babka when Jerry comes to the defense of cinnamon. Jerry gets a black and white cookie, meticulously eating both halves equally as a metaphor for "racial harmony". The babka has a hair on it; unable to stomach this due to a traumatic childhood overreaction to a hair in his farina, Jerry takes another number to wait for a replacement. The new cake is handed over by a sickly clerk having a coughing fit.

George and Kramer get trapped in their parking spot by an unseen double parker, who still has not returned as night falls, leaving Kramer freezing without a coat. Ranting, George wonders if the double parker is a genius who had a fit of stupidity, or a future dictator in the making. He also fears Elaine's wrath, which she indeed vows to visit upon him for keeping her waiting. The two halves of Jerry's cookie do not "get along", making him throw up for the first time in 14 years. A hobbling man crushes Elaine's foot under his cane.

Kramer takes refuge back in the liquor store, where George's coat knocks over a display of wine bottles. George gives up his coat as compensation, and they are both thrown out in the cold. The double parker returns, turning out to be a dead ringer for Saddam Hussein but for his soft-spoken politeness.

Everyone finally meets up, driving to the party in miserable silence. They duly drop off their gifts and leave immediately.

== Production ==
The Saddam Hussein lookalike cast for the episode, Amjad J. Qaisen, could not speak intelligibly enough for television production purposes, so the voice of "Hussein" was added in post-production by Seinfeld co-creator Larry David.
