= The Non-Fat Yogurt =

- Seinfeld episode
- Episode no.: Season 5 Episode 7
- Directed by: Tom Cherones
- Written by: Larry David
- Production code: 507
- Original air date: November 4, 1993

Guest appearances
- Wayne Knight as Newman; Estelle Harris as Estelle Costanza; Jerry Stiller as Frank Costanza; Maryedith Burrell as Maryedith; Peter Keleghan as Lloyd Braun; John Christian Graas as Matthew; Hugh A. Rose as Doctor; Lisa Houle as Cheryl; Jed Mills as Joel; John Gabriel as Newscaster; Darrell Kunitomi as Lab Technician; Rudy Giuliani as himself (uncredited)

Episode chronology
← Previous "The Lip Reader"	Next → "The Barber"

"The Non-Fat Yogurt" is the 71st episode of the NBC sitcom Seinfeld. It is the seventh episode of the fifth season, and first aired on November 4, 1993. In this episode, the delicious "non-fat" yogurt at a new shop makes everyone inexplicably gain weight, while George tries to outsmart his childhood nemesis Lloyd Braun. These events accidentally change the course of the 1993 New York City mayoral election.

This is the first appearance Braun, played here by Peter Keleghan. Braun would reappear, played by Matt McCoy, in "The Gum" and "The Serenity Now". Maryedith and Matthew previously appeared in "The Parking Space".

== Plot ==
Jerry, Elaine, George, and Newman are fixated on a new frozen yogurt shop in which Kramer has invested. They are delighted by the fact that the yogurt is advertised as non-fat. Kramer notices that Jerry and Elaine have gained weight. They become suspicious that the yogurt may not be non-fat, so they send it to a laboratory for testing.

Jerry accidentally swears near the shop owner's son Matthew, who then starts to swear frequently. Matthew's mother brings him over so that Jerry can explain to him that cursing is wrong. However, Jerry has a cassette tape of a particularly successful ad-libbed set from a comedy show the previous night, and curses at Matthew again when he destroys it.

George runs into his childhood nemesis Lloyd Braun and makes a derisive nudge to Jerry. When Lloyd notices, George pretends that it is an involuntary spasm caused by an injury. George then has to fake the spasm repeatedly in his presence. Lloyd refers him to a doctor, who concludes that George is faking it. As he leaves the doctor's office, George bumps his elbow on the desk and experiences a real spasm, which worries him.

Elaine starts dating Lloyd, who works as an aide to the mayor of New York City David Dinkins, who is running for re-election against Rudy Giuliani. Elaine suggests an idea for everyone in New York to wear name tags in public, but the date ends badly when Elaine, due to her weight gain from the frozen yogurt, later breaks a chair. After three days without a phone call, Elaine learns from Kramer and a news report that the name tag idea has damaged Dinkins' campaign, and Lloyd was fired for it.

Kramer dates one of the lab technicians, despite Jerry's fears that such a relationship might interfere with the test's results. They make out at the lab after hours, and unknowingly knock a sample of blood into a test tube of Giuliani's blood. This causes Giuliani's results to show he has a high level of cholesterol, to which Giuliani, at a press conference, instead attributes to the supposedly non-fat frozen yogurt. When the lab results show that the yogurt does, indeed, contain fat, Jerry phones Giuliani's headquarters with the tip, and in a following press conference, the prospective mayor promises a crackdown on false advertising. The issue ignites voters, and Giuliani wins the election. When Jerry's local frozen yogurt shop switches to real non-fat yogurt, it tastes awful and business plummets. Matthew curses at Jerry for ruining his father's business.

== Production ==
As the episode was to air two days after the 1993 New York City mayoral election, the production crew's solution was to produce two different versions of the episode: one in which Dinkins won, and another in which Giuliani won. The plot is the same in both versions; the Giuliani version simply replaced any reference to Dinkins with a reference to Giuliani, and vice versa. The Seinfeld crew recounted that Giuliani (who was a fan of the show) and his campaign staff were immediately supportive when consulted about the episode, and they made plans to have him appear in the episode. The Dinkins camp were more reluctant to get involved, and so Phil Morris was cast as a spokesman in lieu of Dinkins himself in the Dinkins version of the episode.

Because of the short interval between the election and the airing of the episode, Giuliani's scenes had to be filmed on the morning after his victory. Both versions of the episode were included on the season five DVD.

All instances of the profanities being uttered were censored; there is no uncensored version of this episode available.

The table reading for "The Non-Fat Yogurt" was held on October 20, 1993.
