= The Glasses =

- Seinfeld episode
- Episode no.: Season 5 Episode 3
- Directed by: Tom Cherones
- Written by: Tom Gammill & Max Pross
- Production code: 502
- Original air date: September 30, 1993

Guest appearances
- Timothy Stack as Dwayne; Anna Gunn as Amy; Tom Towles as Tough Guy; Len Lesser as Uncle Leo; Rance Howard as Blind Man; Michael Saad as Doctor

Episode chronology
← Previous "The Puffy Shirt"	Next → "The Sniffing Accountant"
- Seinfeld season 5

"The Glasses" is the third episode of the fifth season of the American sitcom Seinfeld. The 67th episode of the series overall, it was written by the writing team Tom Gammill and Max Pross, their debut for the series, and directed by Tom Cherones. It first aired on NBC on September 30, 1993.

In this episode, George, shopping for new glasses, believes he sees Jerry's girlfriend Amy with Jerry's cousin Jeffrey. He fails to get a discount through Kramer's optometrist connection, while Elaine gets bitten by a dog. Rance Howard appears as a blind man, while Anna Gunn plays Amy. This episode ends with the dedication "In memory of our friend, John Oteri". Oteri worked as a camera operator on the show.

== Plot ==
Jerry is getting an air conditioner on discount through Kramer's connections, because his apartment is too hot for his girlfriend Amy. George arrives wearing his prescription swim goggles, complaining that someone stole his glasses during a swim. Kramer promises George a discount through Dwayne, another of his connections, at an optometrist.

George, paralyzed with indecision over glasses frames, traps Jerry and Elaine at the optometrist with him. A man enters with a dog, which bites Elaine. George goes after the dog owner, but stops when, squinting, he sees something unspeakable. Jerry ignores Elaine's plight to force George to spill the beans: he saw Amy making out with Jerry's cousin Jeffrey.

Jerry takes Elaine to the hospital, but lets her hold a door for him as she hobbles, bleeding. Elaine asks about a rabies shot, but the doctor misunderstands and sends her off. Jerry trusts in George's uncanny eyesight while squinting, which once got them through a drive back from the Catskills. However, Amy denies Jerry's accusations and takes offense, and he regrets exposing his "ugly side" too soon. Elaine has become afraid of dogs, whether big or small. Jerry second-guesses George's squinting when George spots a dropped dime from across the room, but then bites into an onion as if it was an apple.

Outraged that George got no discount from Dwayne, Kramer declares Dwayne beholden to him for getting Dwayne clean from a wretched candy addiction, taunting Dwayne with a chocolate bar until he relents. However, Jerry and Kramer immediately recognize that George bought women's glasses, from the Gloria Vanderbilt collection no less. Elaine starts showing rabies symptoms, like explosive irritability and foaming at the mouth, so she finally gets vaccinated.

Jerry schemes to force Amy to confront Jeffrey when he goes to pick up Paul Simon tickets from Jeffrey. Elaine insists that Amy would never date the horse-faced Jeffrey. Kramer sets up the air conditioner in Jerry's window, but puts off securing it. Elaine spots the dog owner from the window and provokes him, and the air conditioner falls out and lands on his dog.

George meets a blind man whose glasses pinch his nose, and they swap glasses frames since he cannot see what George's look like. The dog owner arrives in search of Elaine, and George cavalierly sends him after Jerry. At Jeffrey's, Jerry and Amy find Uncle Leo, who relays the tickets and an apology from Jeffrey for the bad seats. Jerry, hastily assuming the apology would be a confession of guilt, mistakenly accuses Amy again.

George regrets that the blind man's glasses really do pinch. He thinks he sees Amy and Jeffrey again, but then sees the scene clearly as a mounted policewoman affectionately petting her horse. George, learning that Jerry had to compensate the dog owner, keeps quiet; he overlooks his old glasses, misplaced on top of his locker all along.

== Production ==
The first of many episodes written by the Gammill–Pross duo, "The Glasses" broke from convention established by Larry David and Jerry Seinfeld: while still using true stories as a basis, like having glasses stolen, Gammill and Pross introduced improbable twists, like George confusing a real horse for Cousin Jeffrey. David and Seinfeld were immediately challenged by the script's unfamiliar structure. Seinfeld, noting that it was proving difficult to make every story relatable, credited Gammill and Pross with revitalizing the show as it entered its middle period.

The theft of writer Tom Gammill's glasses from a gym was the inspiration for George's predicament. Gammill's solution was to wear prescription goggles.

According to Gammill and Pross, Jerry called in the optometrist's favor in the first script draft, but Seinfeld gave this role to Richards, demonstrating generosity in sharing the spotlight. Originally, Kramer would have been bitten by a deer at ren faire. They recall that David contributed jokes such as Jerry's "ugly side", the drive back from the Catskills, and the optometrist's candy addiction, while Seinfeld contributed his own casual cruelty towards Elaine. George spotting the dime was added in a later writing session, borrowing from a similar ruse used by a blind character in The Great Escape.

In a deleted scene, Jerry is forced to pay full price for the air conditioner when Kramer's discount falls through. Gammill and Pross also had Jerry's self-sabotage drive Amy into Jeffrey's arms after all, shown in another deleted scene where she makes out with Jeffrey (shown from behind, and not speaking); in the first draft, she would have hooked up with Kramer at ren faire.
