= Poet shirt =

Style of shirt

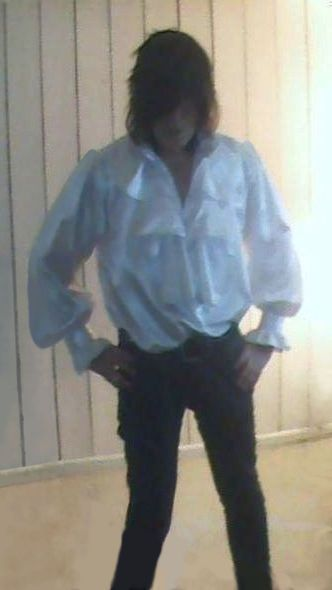
A man wearing a ruffled white satin poet blouse.

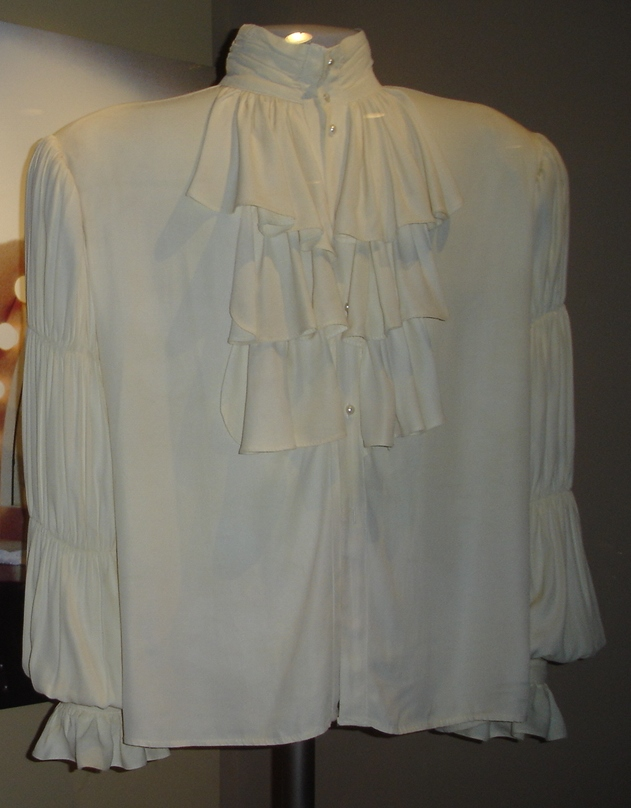
The famous Seinfeld "puffy shirt", an example of a poet shirt blouse.

A poet shirt (also known as a poet blouse or pirate shirt) is a type of shirt made as a loose-fitting blouse with full bishop sleeves, usually decorated with large frills on the front and on the cuffs. Typically, it has a laced-up V-neck opening, designed to pull over the head, but can have a full-length opening fastened by buttons. The collar may be standing or folded over with points. Fabrics commonly used in its manufacture include linen, cotton, satin and velvet, while frills may be of the same fabric or of lace. Originally intended as a male garment, it is also worn by women today (though still interchangeably referred to as both a "shirt" and a "blouse" regardless of which gender is wearing it).

== History ==
Although descended from the shirts worn by men in the 17th and 18th centuries, the modern poet blouse combines two aspects: the fineness of ruffled shirts worn as an undergarment by aristocrats and the informality of plain shirts worn (normally open-necked) as a standalone garment by workmen. Inspired by Romanticism, it was a popular style for boys during the 19th century and for the pseudo-historical costumes worn by Hollywood actors portraying characters such as swordsmen or pirates during the 20th century.

One example of this is professional musician/actor Meat Loaf, who was known for his eccentric on-stage attire since the late 1970s, typically consisting of either sequined black vests or a tuxedo consisting of a black blazer, matching pants and shoes, and a white poet blouse with a red handkerchief, which he would hold in his hand or tie to the microphone stand. This look was sometimes described as his "prom tux", since this type of suit is most commonly associated with high school proms.

A tailored version of the poet shirt became highly fashionable for young men during the 1960s, particularly in London. Jane Ormsby Gore described her discussions at that time with her then husband, Michael Rainey, who owned a men's clothing shop in Chelsea: "We were very influenced by Byron … those Byron shirts with frilly fronts and big sleeves". Epitomised by bands such as Duran Duran and Spandau Ballet, the vogue for androgynous frilly blouses played a significant part in the New Romantic male fashion of the 1980s. Today, the style remains popular in some modern movements such as the Goth subculture, where it may be valued simply for its romantic or swashbuckling image, intended as part of a themed costume (e.g., vampire) or worn in defiance of mainstream conventions as a deliberate expression of gender ambiguity (in the same tradition as glam rock).

In 1993, American sitcom Seinfeld references this type of shirt in the season 5 episode "The Puffy Shirt," when Jerry mistakenly agrees to wear one on The Today Show because Kramer's girlfriend spoke too quietly for him to understand what she was asking.

A ruffled poet shirt, often worn with a wide belt or other item of clothing traditionally associated with pirates, has been the central theme of a spate of fashion trends stimulated by the Pirates of the Caribbean series of adventure films, the first of which was released in 2003.
