= Leonard Termo =

American actor

- Born: March 6, 1935; Brooklyn, New York, U.S.
- Died: October 30, 2012 (aged 77); Santa Clarita, California, U.S.

Leonard Termo (March 6, 1935 – October 30, 2012) was an American character actor whose numerous film and television roles included Fight Club, Johnny Dangerously, and Seinfeld.

Termo was born in Brooklyn, New York. He worked as a businessman in Manhattan's Garment District until he left the industry in the mid-1970s to pursue acting as a full-time profession. In a November 1983 New York magazine article profiling actor Mickey Rourke, Termo told the interviewer that he had given up much of his life to continue acting, saying he "left it all—my wife, my kid, my money, everything... I love acting. I'm broke. I sleep on a cot." Termo made his film debut in the 1983 movie Heart Like a Wheel.

Termo formed a long personal and professional friendship with Rourke during the 1980s after Rourke saw Termo performing at a theater in Los Angeles. The Hollywood Reporter described the duo as "constant companions" for years. Termo appeared in five of Rourke's films throughout the 1980s, beginning with The Pope of Greenwich Village in 1984. Rourke and Termo had appeared together in Year of the Dragon in 1985, Barfly in 1987, A Prayer for the Dying, also released in 1987, and Homeboy in 1988. Termo and Rourke were also set to co-star in a film on 1930s-era gangster Jack "Legs" Diamond (with Rourke as Diamond and Termo portraying Diamond's bodyguard), but the proposed Embassy Pictures movie was never made.

Termo's other 1980s film roles included The Cotton Club in 1984; Johnny Dangerously in 1984; and Turk 182 in 1985. His film career continued in the 1990s and 2000s with parts in Ruby in 1992; the Tim Burton film Ed Wood in 1994, in which he played a make-up artist; Lost Highway in 1997; Fight Club in 1999; and Ali in 2001.

His television credits included Wiseguy and Lois & Clark: The New Adventures of Superman. Termo appeared in the premiere episode of the comedy television series Seinfeld's fifth season—in "The Mango", aired on September 16, 1993, Termo portrayed Joe, the owner of Joe's Fruits store, who bans both Kramer (Michael Richards) and Jerry (Jerry Seinfeld) from his store after Kramer criticizes one of his bad peaches.

Termo died in his sleep at his home in Santa Clarita, California, on October 30, 2012, at the age of 77. His death was confirmed by Termo's friend, actor Elias Koteas. On November 2, 2012, actor Matt Dillon dedicated an award he received at the Savannah Film Festival in honor of Termo, who was also a friend of Dillon's.

== Partial filmography ==
- Heart Like a Wheel (1983) as Good Joe
- Dragster (1983) - Good Joe
- Blood Feud (1983) - L.A. Teamster
- The Pope of Greenwich Village (1984) - Fat Waldo
- The Cotton Club (1984) - Danny
- Johnny Dangerously (1984) - Tony Scarano
- Turk 182 (1985) - Barricade Cop
- Year of the Dragon (1985) - Angelo Rizzo
- A Prayer for the Dying (1987) - Bonati
- Barfly (1987) - Harry
- Zits (1988) - KGB Chief
- Bloodhounds of Broadway (1989) - Goodtime Nate Fishkin
- Hider in the House (1989) - George / Exterminator
- My Blue Heaven (1990)
- Midnight Cabaret - Lt. McMurphy
- Mobsters (1991) - Joe Palermo
- 29th Street (1991) - Dr. Puccini
- Ruby (1992) - Tony Ana
- Nowhere to Run (1993) - Bus Guard
- Gettysburg (1993) - Cpl. George F. Estabrook
- Ed Wood (1994) - Makeup Man Harry
- Mojave Moon (1996) - Shorty
- Lost Highway (1997) - Judge (voice)
- Gone Fishin' (1997) - Vending Worker #1
- Lover Girl (1997) - Mr. Johnny
- Godzilla (1998) - Homeless Guy
- Ballad of the Nightingale (1999) - Tony the Tank
- Fight Club (1999) – Desk Sergeant
- Family Tree (1999) – Vince
- Blood Type (1999) – Chauffeur
- Double Bang (2001) – Al Lucito
- Ali (2001) – Madison Square Garden Reporter #1
- Gods and Generals (2003) – Glazier Estabrook (uncredited) (final film role)
