= Charles Levin (actor) =

American actor (1949–2019)

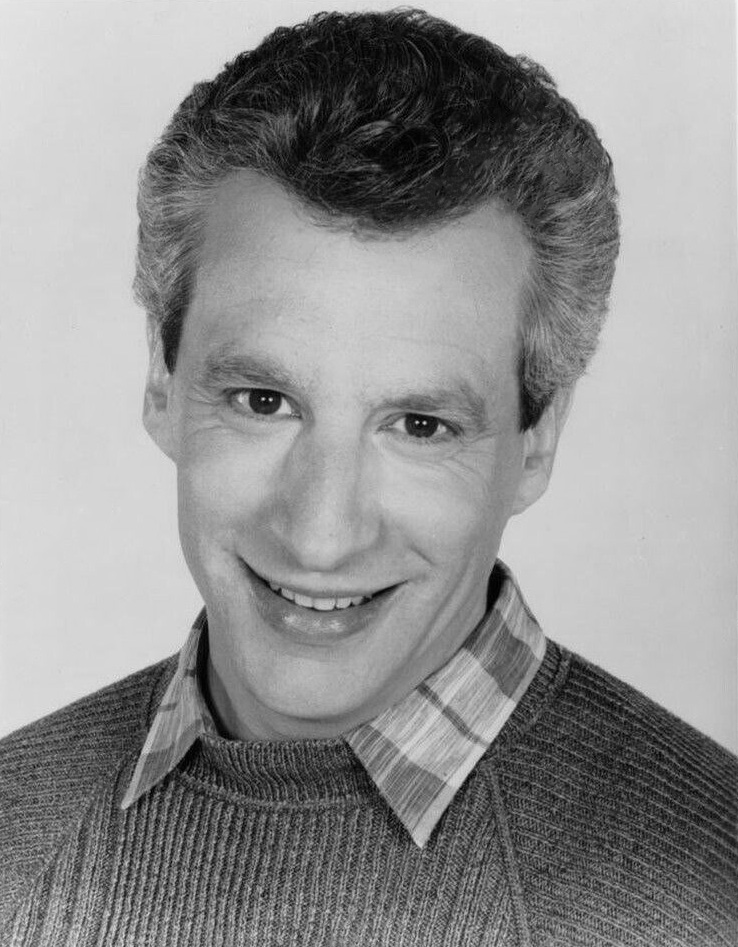
- Levin in 1987
- Born: Charles Herbert Levin; March 12, 1949; Chicago, Illinois, U.S.
- Died: c. June 28, 2019 (aged 70); Selma, Oregon, U.S.
- Occupation: Actor
- Years active: 1975–2004
- Spouse: Katherine DeHetre (m. 1983; died 2007)
- Children: 3

Charles Herbert Levin (March 12, 1949 – c. June 28, 2019) was an American actor who appeared in television, movies and on stage. He played Elliot Novak on the series Alice, having become a regular in the show's ninth season, and had a recurring role of Eddie Gregg on Hill Street Blues from 1982 to 1986.

== Early life and career ==
Levin was born in Chicago, Illinois on March 12, 1949. He acted in television, film and on stage.

He appeared as a guest star on many television shows. He also appeared in the television series Alice as the character of Elliot Novak. He became a regular in the show's ninth season. He had the recurring role of Eddie Gregg on Hill Street Blues from 1982 to 1986. Other series in which he appeared include Capital News (as Vinnie DiSalvo), Family Ties, Tales from the Darkside, The Twilight Zone, The Facts of Life, Falcon Crest (as Arthur Haberman), Punky Brewster (as Officer Bob), Thirtysomething, Night Court, L.A. Law (as Robert Caporale), Designing Women, Murphy Brown, NYPD Blue, and Law & Order. Levin also played the mohel in "The Bris" episode of Seinfeld, and Coco, the gay cook, in the pilot episode of The Golden Girls. His character was written out because the part of Sophia Petrillo (played by Estelle Getty) changed from a recurring role to a main character.

== Personal life ==
Levin was Jewish. Levin married Katherine DeHetre in 1983. Together, they had three children.

=== Disappearance and death ===
On July 8, 2019, Levin's son reported to the police that Levin was missing, and had not been heard from since June 28. At the time, Levin lived in Grants Pass, Oregon, and was in the process of moving to a new house in the town. Levin's car was found on July 12 on a remote road northeast of Selma, Oregon. The body of his dog was found inside. Levin's unclothed body was found a day later. On November 8, 2019, authorities confirmed Levin's cause of death to be accidental. His car became stuck where it was later found, on an unmaintained wilderness road. After trying to free it, it appeared he left the car in search of help and fell to his death down a 30-foot (9 m) embankment. He was 70.

== Filmography ==
- Everybody Rides the Carousel (1975) – Stage 6 (voice)
- Annie Hall (1977) – Actor in Rehearsal
- Between the Lines (1977) – Paul
- A Doonesbury Special (1977) – Mark Slackmeyer
- Rush It (1978) – Dr. Levy
- Manhattan (1979) – Television Actor #1
- The Seduction of Joe Tynan (1979) – John Cairn
- Honeysuckle Rose (1980) – Sid
- Washington Mistress (1982, TV movie) – Larry
- Hill Street Blues (1982–1986) - Eddie Gregg
- Deal of the Century (1983) – Dr. Rechtin
- Alice (1976) (Season 8 recurring, Season 9 regular: 1983–85) – Elliot Novak
- This Is Spinal Tap (1984) – Disc 'n' Dat Manager
- Do You Remember Love (1985, TV movie) – Dr. Raymond Sawyer
- The Golden Girls (1985, TV pilot) - Coco
- The Man with One Red Shoe (1985) – CIA Dentist
- The Golden Child (1986) – TV Host
- The Couch Trip (1988) – TV Reporter
- Home Free (1988, TV movie) – Barry Kramer
- No Holds Barred (1989) – Ordway
- Immediate Family (1989) – Eli's Dad
- Opposites Attract (1990) – Marcino
- Seinfeld (1993) (Episode: The Bris) – The Mohel
- NYPD Blue (1994–95) – A.D.A. Maury Abrams
- A Civil Action (1998) – Geologist (final film role)
- Drake & Josh (2004) – Coach Davis
