= The Puffy Shirt =

- Seinfeld episode
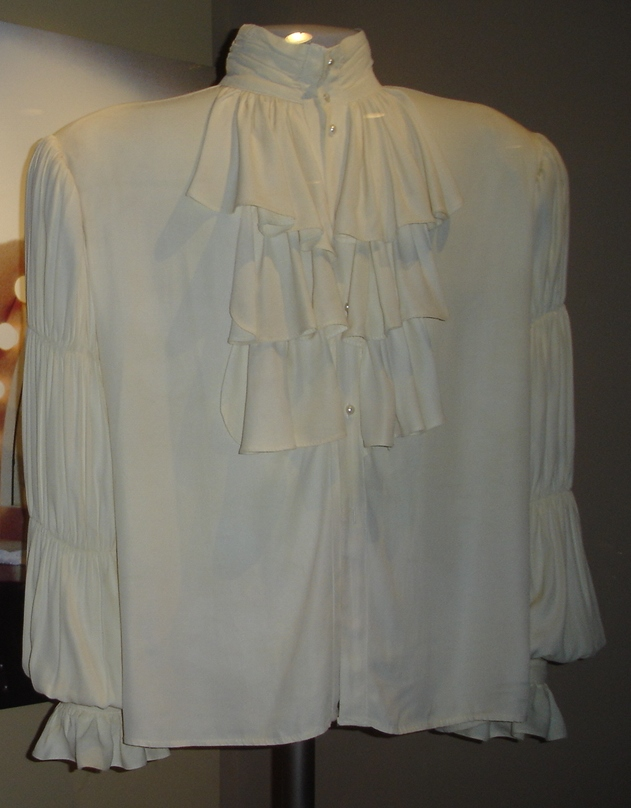
- The Puffy Shirt on display at the National Museum of American History in 2006
- Episode no.: Season 5 Episode 2
- Directed by: Tom Cherones
- Written by: Larry David
- Production code: 502
- Original air date: September 23, 1993

Guest appearances
- Estelle Harris as Estelle Costanza; Jerry Stiller as Frank Costanza; Wendel Meldrum as Leslie; David Brisbin as Client; Bryant Gumbel as himself; Deborah May as Elsa; Michael Mitz as Photographer

Episode chronology
← Previous "The Mango"	Next → "The Glasses"
- Seinfeld season 5

"The Puffy Shirt" is the second episode of the fifth season of the American NBC sitcom Seinfeld. It was the 66th episode and originally aired on September 23, 1993. In this episode, bluffing through a conversation with Kramer's girlfriend who speaks inaudibly, Jerry unwittingly agrees to wear a flamboyant puffy shirt she designed to a TV appearance promoting a charity benefit. George runs out of money and moves back in with his parents, but gets scouted as a hand model.

This episode popularized the term "low talker". Larry David, the co-creator of the show, came up with the idea to use the shirt, and cites this episode as one of his favorites in the series.

== Plot ==
George, having depleted his savings while unemployed, turns down borrowing from Jerry and rooming with Kramer, and has no choice but to move back in with his parents. Helping George move, Jerry tests first-hand George's claim that his mother Estelle never laughs. Jerry and Kramer turn down Estelle's bologna sandwiches, and George despairs when his friends must finally leave him.

Jerry and Elaine go to dinner with Kramer and his girlfriend Leslie, a "low-talker" who speaks indistinctly. Kramer touts Leslie's new fashion design, a puffy stereotypical pirate shirt, believing that it will be trendsetting. Elaine mentions that she set up Jerry to perform at a Goodwill benefit to clothe the disadvantaged, and also to promote the benefit on The Today Show. However, all she and Jerry can do is nod along and agree with Leslie's inaudible replies when Kramer steps away.

Meanwhile, George is trapped at dinner with his parents, as Estelle nags him to take a civil service exam, and Frank reminisces about his silver dollar collection. Desperately excusing himself, George bumps into a woman, who admires his hands and scouts him as a hand model. George immediately becomes conceited and overprotective of his hands, making a fuss when Kramer pranks him with a joy buzzer, and wearing two oven mitts out.

After George leaves, Kramer unveils the puffy shirt for Jerry, because he unknowingly agreed during dinner to wear it on The Today Show. Kramer does not take no for an answer, since Leslie has secured many orders conditioned on this publicity stunt.

George becomes a prima donna at home, pampering himself with a manicure as Estelle caters to his demands, and even walking out on his parents' asinine bickering. At George's photo shoot, he is heralded as the successor of Ray McKigney, a legendary former model. He is warned about Ray's autoerotic fixation on his own hands, which spiraled into a masturbation addiction that locked his hands permanently into claw grips, unable to even feed himself.

At The Today Show, Jerry fumes at the indignity of the puffy shirt, while Elaine is horrified that he will make a mockery of the benefit. Failing to get Bryant Gumbel off his case over the shirt, Jerry reaches his limit and excoriates the shirt on air. Leslie rages, now perfectly audible, at Jerry's betrayal. George, scoring a big check and a date from his shoot, cavorts jubilantly to meet Jerry. After taking off his protective gloves for Elaine, he mocks whoever made Jerry wear the puffy shirt unaware Leslie is in the room. She reacts by shoving George headlong into the dressing table, forcing him to brace his fall on a clothes iron that Kramer forgot to turn off. As George burns his now exposed hands, his scream echoes throughout 30 Rockefeller Plaza.

George, with both hands bandaged, is jobless once more, and cannot feed himself; Jerry is humiliated by hecklers with pirate jokes during the benefit show; Goodwill fires Elaine from benefit planning; and Kramer has callously dumped Leslie after her career was ruined. With all the puffy shirts donated to Goodwill, Jerry meets panhandlers wearing them, and sees the shirt in a better light.

== Production ==
This was the first episode to feature Jerry Stiller recast as George Costanza's father, Frank, replacing John Randolph. Stiller was cast while in New York and flown to Los Angeles for filming without an audition. Stiller's Frank Costanza was conceived by David as meek and deferential to Estelle, but, dissatisfied with his own performance after four days on set, and assuming that he was as replaceable as his predecessor, Stiller conceived of his unhinged interpretation of Frank by playing off Harris's Estelle. Stiller later reshot Randolph's scenes as Frank in "The Handicap Spot" for syndication.

The story was based on David bluffing through dinner with a real-life "low talker" after he gave up asking her to repeat herself; since he could have agreed to anything this way, he added the idea of agreeing to wear an unexpected piece of clothing. The shirt itself was made exaggeratedly puffy on camera by inserting wires in the sleeves. Writing for Smithsonian, Owen Edwards called the shirt "one of the most memorable props" in Seinfeld. The shirt was donated to the National Museum of American History in November 2004. It was displayed alongside other famous film props such as the ruby slippers from The Wizard of Oz and the Kermit the Frog puppet from Sesame Street.

The Today scene was filmed in the show's studio in New York with its regular camera crew.
