= The Bris =

- Seinfeld episode
- Episode no.: Season 5 Episode 5
- Directed by: Tom Cherones
- Written by: Larry Charles
- Production code: 505
- Original air date: October 14, 1993

Guest appearances
- Charles Levin as Mohel; Debra Mooney as Mrs. Sweedler; Tom Alan Robbins as Stan; Jeannie Elias as Myra; John Gegenhuber as Resident; Tia Riebling as Woman; Frank Noon as Patient

Episode chronology
← Previous "The Sniffing Accountant"	Next → "The Lip Reader"
- Seinfeld season 5

"The Bris" is the 69th episode of the sitcom Seinfeld. It is the fifth episode of the fifth season, and first aired on October 14, 1993. In this episode, Jerry and Elaine become godparents to a friend's baby, but are unenthusiastic about organizing the baby's bris. Kramer tries to stop the baby's circumcision, and to prove he saw a "pig-man" in the hospital. George's car roof gets cratered by a suicidal jumper.

== Plot ==
Everyone goes to the hospital to see Jerry's friend Stan and his wife Myra's newborn baby, as announced in the previous episode. Jerry and Elaine cannot match the couple's enthusiasm, while George is preoccupied with admiring his perfect parking spot out a window and congratulating himself. Kramer gets lost in the hospital, and points an escaped patient to the elevator. He peeks at a strangely grunting patient behind a curtain, and staggers away in horror.

Stan and Myra ask Jerry and Elaine to be the baby's godparents, which obliges them to help organize the baby's bris. Jerry is inspired to do underwhelming impressions of Marlon Brando as Don Corleone. No one believes Kramer's claim that he saw a "half-pig, half-man" mutant. Suddenly, the escaped patient jumps from the hospital roof, landing on George's parked car.

Elaine is confounded by finding and booking a mohel, while Jerry complains that he has to hold the baby for the circumcision. Kramer flaunts a newspaper article about genetic research at a hospital as proof that he has uncovered a government conspiracy to create an army of "pig-men". He also objects to circumcision on principle, while everyone compares notes on what uncircumcised penises look like. George wonders if he would be more desirable in comparison to pig-men.

George incredulously promises to give the pig-man a ride if Kramer breaks him out of the hospital. Kramer, harassing a hapless hospital resident, learns that the patient he saw was discharged. The damage to George's car will cost more than the car is worth to repair, so he glibly tries to hold the hospital responsible. The hospital administrator, assuming this is a shakedown, throws him out.

At the bris, Jerry and Elaine begrudge Stan and Myra for trying to skip a grade in their friendship. Kramer traumatizes Myra trying to guilt her over the circumcision. The mohel, a very high-strung man, panics and admonishes the attendees at the slightest provocation, including the baby's crying, the dangers of the neighborhood, and Elaine putting a glass too close to a table edge. He drops his instruments, and regrets his career choice.

Kramer seizes the baby, but fails to get away. As Jerry holds the baby against his own will and the mohel trembles with agitation, George faints dead away at the tension. Jerry gets his own finger "circumcised" in the chaos, and everyone rides to the hospital crammed under George's cratered car roof. George congratulates himself again for finding easily accessed parking.

At the hospital, Jerry and the mohel go at each other's throats. Stan and Myra, confirming that the circumcision was not botched, side with the mohel. Kramer absconds with the pig-man on his back, but the pig-man turns out to be a diminutive mental patient, who steals George's easily accessible car.

Stan and Myra have Kramer take over for Jerry and Elaine, now appreciating his devotion to the baby. They plead fealty to Kramer—who upstages Jerry's Brando impersonation−as "godfather" as incidental film music plays.

== Production ==
Jason Alexander, who is Jewish, considered the portrayal of the mohel to be offensive and hated the characterization. He argued with Larry David, threatening to boycott the episode if he did not rewrite the character. David softened the portrayal, but Alexander refused to appear in any scenes with the character. Alexander ultimately does appear in the bris scene with the mohel character and even converses with him before passing out.
