= The Sniffing Accountant =

- Seinfeld episode
- Episode no.: Season 5 Episode 4
- Directed by: Tom Cherones
- Written by: Larry David & Jerry Seinfeld
- Production code: 504
- Original air date: October 7, 1993

Guest appearances
- Wayne Knight as Newman; Estelle Harris as Estelle; Jerry Stiller as Frank; John Kapelos as Barry; Richard Fancy as Lippman; Marty Rackham as Jake; Patrick Cronin as Farkus; Christa Miller as Ellen

Episode chronology
← Previous "The Glasses"	Next → "The Bris"
- Seinfeld season 5

"The Sniffing Accountant" is the 68th episode of the sitcom Seinfeld, being the fourth episode of the series' fifth season. It aired on NBC on October 7, 1993.

In the episode, Jerry, Kramer, and Newman entrust their money to an accountant, but his habitual sniffing convinces them that he is snorting cocaine. George interviews for a bra salesman job, and Elaine nitpicks her otherwise perfect boyfriend for writing without exclamation points.

The episode was written by the creators of Seinfeld, Larry David and Jerry Seinfeld, and directed by Tom Cherones. To research the recurring joke of taking a stranger's clothing material between thumb and forefinger, David did this himself, assessing the different kinds of fabric and the owners' reactions. The episode received positive reviews from critics and received a 19.1/21 Nielsen rating.

== Plot ==
At Monk's, Elaine recounts meeting her new writer boyfriend, Jake Jarmel, at work when he audaciously "felt her material" by taking her jacket between his thumb and forefinger. She has found nothing wrong with Jake, but George foresees that this will not last. Jerry has started wearing a sweater he found in the closet.

Barry Prophet, Elaine's accountant—who is also managing Jerry's money—passes by. As they all make small talk, Barry sniffs repeatedly at seemingly nothing. Jerry and George worry that Barry could be snorting cocaine and funding his habit with Jerry's money.

Obediently returning home for dinner, George learns that Frank got him an interview for a bra salesman job. He is galled at his parents assuming that he knows nothing about bras. For George's edification, Frank checks what Estelle's bras are made out of, then explains that bras are "cups in the front, loops in the back".

Kramer is likewise alarmed because he and Newman also entrusted money to Barry. Though Barry does not use Kramer's stereotyped addict slang, Kramer reels at the damning evidence that Barry used a bathroom. He gladly takes Jerry's itchy sweater off his hands, and wears it everywhere.

Elaine is delighted to come home to Jake having cooked and cleaned. He has also transcribed her phone messages, including one announcing a friend's baby. Elaine is let down that Jake did not punctuate this exciting news with an exclamation point, and scolds him for the omission until he walks out. Jerry is baffled at this, but Elaine has no regrets. However, her boss Lippman catches her gratuitously inserting exclamation points throughout Jake's book manuscript, and chews her out.

Barry goes on a South America trip, which Jerry, Kramer, and Newman all assume to be for drug running. Elaine, vouching for Barry, objects that they have no evidence, so they stake out Barry's after-work bar, planning to catch him in a sting "like Abscam". Kramer, incognito, finds Barry still sniffing. To gain Barry's confidence, he lays on thick his impression of a hedonistic junkie, downing an entire mug of beer with a cigarette in his mouth, then smoking the cigarette backwards. When this fails, he ambushes Barry on the toilet with a Polaroid camera. Jerry pushes Newman to try Glide floss as they wait for Kramer.

At the interview, George frames his "interest" in bras as a wide-eyed childhood passion, and gets hired. He then presumptuously feels a woman's material without a word, outraging her. She turns out to be a company bigwig, and his hiring is rescinded. Back home, Frank and Estelle berate George for feeling material.

Despite failing to catch Barry red-handed, Jerry writes a letter to demand everyone's money back, tormenting Elaine with his profusion of exclamation points. Another explanation for Barry's sniffing comes to light when Kramer's mohair sweater triggers a pizza delivery man's allergies. Newman nearly mails Jerry's letter with Kramer's photo enclosed, but at the mailbox, Newman feels a woman's material and gets chased off, losing the letter.

Everyone's relief turns to regret when Barry files for bankruptcy, revealing that he did indeed spend their money on drugs. Jerry has missed his chance to get reimbursed, but a woman feels Jerry's material, and comes on to him.

== Production ==
This episode was written by series co-creators Larry David and Jerry Seinfeld and directed by Tom Cherones. The cast first read the script for this episode on September 8, 1993, at 11:00 a.m. Filming took place on September 14, 1993, with eighteen members of the Vandelay Industries Mailing Listing (a Seinfeld fan club) among the audience.

"My accountant, whose name I won’t mention (not that he doesn’t deserve the infamy) stole, I think, $50,000 from me, and snorted it up his nose...[I] just gave him an envelope of cash, and never saw it again. And I used to talk about that guy and how much I hated him, so he became the Sniffing Accountant. That was some measure of revenge."
— Jerry Seinfeld

In real life, Seinfeld has claimed that his accountant stole money (about US$50,000) from him to buy illegal drugs, with his suspicions inspiring the main plotline for this episode.

David actually worked as a bra salesman during his years as a struggling comedian. That had been many years prior to this episode though, so he had to do research in order to write dialogue pertaining to the configuration of modern bras. The writer's assistants called bra companies to ask questions.

Kramer's display of simultaneous drinking and smoking in this episode was unscripted. On the first attempt, Michael Richards let out a loud belch (with smoke) that earned uproarious laughter from the studio audience, but was deemed too broad by the show's producers, and a second take was done. This scene helped Richards win an Emmy Award for his portrayal of the character. The first take was seen in Seinfeld's one-hour retrospective The Clip Show, which took place prior to the original airing of "The Finale". It was included in the 2005 Season Five DVD set's blooper reel. Julia Louis-Dreyfus said that she was "in awe" when seeing him pull that off.

The line "barring some unforeseen incident" was first uttered in this episode by the character Sid Farkus, and the line would become an ill-omened catchphrase. Julia Louis-Dreyfus commented that it was like a line from Foghorn Leghorn, and worked as a "precursor to chaos".

== Series continuity ==
Elaine and Jake Jarmel get back together and break up again in the season finale, "The Opposite". In the season 6 episode "The Scofflaw", Elaine plans revenge on him.

Sid Farkus returns in "The Doorman", where he is considering doing business with Frank Costanza and Kramer after they create a male bra. The line "barring some unforeseen incident" is uttered once again in that episode by Farkus.

George is seen with a Glamour magazine, a callback to "The Contest".

== Reception ==
This episode gained a 19.1 Nielsen Rating and a 29 audience share, meaning that 19.1% of American households watched the episode, and 29% of all televisions in use at the time were tuned into it. It reran on March 24, 1994, and earned exactly the same numbers, which was a good sign that the show was becoming a hit.
