= The Lip Reader =

- Seinfeld episode
- Episode no.: Season 5 Episode 6
- Directed by: Tom Cherones
- Written by: Carol Leifer
- Production code: 506
- Original air date: October 28, 1993

Guest appearances
- Wayne Knight as Newman; Christopher Darga as Driver; Linda Kash as Gwen; Jerry Sroka as Todd; Marlee Matlin as Laura; Veralyn Jones as Renee; Dylan Haggerty as Young Man; Bret Anthony as Teen

Episode chronology
← Previous "The Bris"	Next → "The Non-Fat Yogurt"

"The Lip Reader" is the 70th episode of the sitcom Seinfeld. It is the sixth episode of the fifth season, and first aired on October 28, 1993. In this episode, Elaine gets caught faking deafness, while Jerry starts dating Laura, a deaf woman who can read lips. George enlists Laura's help to find out the real reason he got dumped. The title character was played by Marlee Matlin.

== Plot ==
At the US Open, George gets a hot fudge sundae. He is oblivious to his messy eating getting broadcast on TV, with the commentators making jokes at his expense.

At Pendant Publishing, Elaine must use the company's car service to cross town. Weary of overly talkative drivers, Elaine gets just such a driver, and resorts to faking deafness to shut him up. Reacting to the driver getting dispatched to pick up Tom Hanks, Elaine blows her cover and gets chastised for her deception.

Jerry is transfixed by a beautiful lineswoman, and resolves to "become one of those guys" who can chat up women from a cold introduction. Not realizing that she is deaf, he rants at her for ignoring him, but realizes his mistake in time.

Elaine, wanting to prove that she is "not a terrible person", gets the driver concert tickets through Kramer's connection to make amends. Since Jerry is now dating Laura, the lineswoman, Kramer asks to try out to be a ball boy for the tournament finals. He is mocked for being the only adult contender, but puts the competition to shame as he tirelessly bounds after balls for hours.

George's girlfriend Gwen breaks up with him; he sees through her excuse of "it's not you, it's me", which he considers his own signature, but fails to get the truth from her. Finally learning about his ignominious, widely-watched TV appearance, he assumes this was Gwen's real reason, because he would have done the same himself. Everyone argues whether George or Gwen must now back out of a party they were all going to.

Having nothing else to do, George goes to dinner with Jerry and Laura, where she shows off her lip reading skills. George proposes to Jerry that Laura help him decipher Gwen's true thoughts at the party. They hide their lips from Laura by pantomiming eating, drinking, and fidgeting, but Laura follows along easily and agrees before they can ask her. Jerry shoots down Newman and Elaine also asking to enlist Laura's help. Laura misunderstands Jerry saying "six" for "sex", throwing her lip reading into question.

Elaine lets everyone use the car service for the party; the talky driver, temporarily deafened from Elaine sending him to a Metallica concert, assumes she pranked him and throws them all out.

At the party, Kramer deploys his rusty sign language skills to relay Laura's signed lip reading. As the host invites Gwen to help him sweep together after the party, Kramer reports that they are going to "sleep together", and George hastily confronts them. After the confusion is cleared up, Kramer and Laura blame each other in a signing frenzy that pokes George in the eye.

At the finals, Kramer, pursuing a ball, leaps headfirst into Monica Seles, ruining her comeback by injury. Laura is picked up by the talky driver, who is immediately suspicious at another deaf passenger.

== Production ==
"The Lip Reader" was writer Carol Leifer's first produced script for Seinfeld. As had become a signature of the show, Leifer drew on her real life experiences for the storylines. While working as a stand-up comedian, Leifer used a car service for traveling between shows; preferring to have "some peace and quiet" during her rides, she was annoyed that she consistently ended up with drivers who would talk to her even when she buried her face in a magazine. She added in Elaine's pretending to be deaf to both tie her plot in with George's and raise the down-to-earth experience of not wanting to talk with drivers to a level of absurdity. Sports commentators ridiculing a spectator who was messily eating a hot fudge sundae was something Leifer actually saw on TV.

In the scene where George comes up with the idea of using Laura to eavesdrop on his ex-girlfriend, Leifer's script had Jerry and George talking out of the sides of their mouths in order to avoid being lip-read by Laura. Actors Jerry Seinfeld and Jason Alexander came up with the idea of using organic gestures to cover their mouths on their own.

== Critical reception ==
David Sims of The A.V. Club gave the episode an A− / B+, calling it "perfectly good but just a little more forgettable than the stone cold classics season five opened with", including "some very memorable moments." Sims notes that much of the episode "makes George look like a fool."

Nick DeNitto remarked that "Laura's lip-reading isn't perfect, which leads to some funny moments of miscommunication."

Commentator Paul Arras praises the episode for its "jokes that take on stereotypes, political correctness, and other assumptions about etiquette."

While Elaine becomes the foil, Matlin plays the character with such self-confidence and empowerment, it's easy to forget that social etiquette implies her deafness should be cause for pity. In a hilarious scene, Jerry and George out to dinner with Laura, go to great lengths to guard their mouths in natural ways, raising a glass to their face or rubbing their eyes so Laura doesn't know they are talking about her. George, of course, lacks the shame he should be expected to feel about using Laura's skill for his own selfish interests. Jerry is more hesitant, saying, "She's not a novelty act, George, where you hire her out for weddings and bar mitzvahs." Eventually Jerry relents to ask, but before he can, Laura blurts out, "Sure. I'll do it." She's turned the tables and demonstrated her own empowerment. Their attempts to disguise their conversation from her failed. She is too good a lip reader to be outwitted.
