= Lawrence H. Levy =

American writer

- Born: New York City, U.S.
- Occupations: Screenwriter; producer; author

Lawrence H. Levy is an American screenwriter, author, and producer. He is perhaps best known for his work on television series Savannah, Fantasy Island, Family Ties, Trapper John, M.D., Saved by the Bell, Who's the Boss?, 7th Heaven, Roseanne, and Seinfeld. Levy is also the author of four mystery novels, published by Penguin Random House. Levy was born in Brooklyn, New York City.

== Awards and nominations ==
Nominated for a 1995 Writers Guild of America Award. He won the 1994 Writers Guild Award in Television for "The Mango" episode of SEINFELD. He was nominated for a 1993-4 Emmy Award for "Outstanding Individual Achievement in Writing in a Comedy Series" for SEINFELD. He was the head writer for the segment "Attack of the Blobs" in the animated television series AHH, REAL MONSTER!. AHH, REAL MONSTERS! won a 1994-5 Daytime Emmy Award for "Outstanding Achievement In Animation".

== Works ==
Books written by Levy, as part of the Mary Handley Mystery Series:

- Near Prospect Park
- Last Stop in Brooklyn
- Brooklyn on Fire
- Second Street Station
