= U.S. Army Corps of Engineers civil works controversies (New Orleans) =

20–21st century political controversies

The United States Army Corps of Engineers is involved with a wide spectrum of public works projects: environmental protection, water supply, recreation, flood damage and reduction, beach nourishment, homeland security, military construction, and support to other Governmental agencies. In 19 different Flood Control Acts since 1917, the United States Congress has authorized the corps to design and build flood protection projects and one risk reduction system in the Greater New Orleans area and throughout the nation.

Many of the Corps of Engineers' civil works projects in New Orleans have been characterized as being riddled with patronage (see pork barrel) or a waste of money. Projects have allegedly been justified based on flawed or manipulated analyses during the planning phase. Some projects are said to have created profound detrimental environmental effects and/or provided questionable economic benefit such as the Mississippi River Gulf Outlet in southeast Louisiana.

Faulty design and substandard construction have been cited in the failure of levees in the wake of Hurricane Katrina. Reforming the Corps' way of doing business has been championed by Senators Russ Feingold and John McCain. The corps has been accused of conducting an orchestrated plan to disparage its critics by posting anonymous online comments. The leader of an independent levee investigation accused the upper levels of the corps of unethical behavior pertaining to its investigation of the levee failures in New Orleans following Hurricane Katrina.

There are several cases of the corps being accused of muzzling expert investigators. John McQuaid from Mother Jones opined that one of the difficulties of making changes is the political process itself.

== Federal investigation of levee failures following Hurricane Katrina ==
=== Interagency Performance Evaluation Task Force (IPET) ===
==== Claims of conflict of interest ====
In October 2005, the Chief of Engineers at the Army Corps, Lt. General Carl Strock commissioned the IPET (Interagency Performance Evaluation Task Force) to evaluate the performance of the hurricane protection systems in New Orleans and the surrounding areas. It was to "provide credible and objective scientific and engineering answers to fundamental questions about the performance of the hurricane protection and flood damage reduction system in the New Orleans metropolitan area." This meant that the organization responsible for the flood protection's performance would convene and manage an investigation of its own work. Neither Louisiana's governor nor the Louisiana Congressional delegation pointed out what appeared to be a conflict of interest. However, Steve Ellis (Taxpayers for Common Sense), Scott Faber (Environmental Defense) and Ivor van Heerden (Louisiana State University Hurricane Center) protested. They preferred to see some sort of independent, federally authorized commission look into the levee breaches, in addition to the Corps.

After the IPET draft final report was released, the grassroots group, Levees.org, headquartered in New Orleans and led by Sandy Rosenthal questioned the credibility of this levee investigation as well. They noted that the study was convened and closely managed by the Corps of Engineers, the agency responsible for the levee design and construction, and that an independent commission should be created. The group contacted U.S. Senator Mary Landrieu's office and submitted documentation with statistics revealing that of the top three IPET leaders, two work for USACE and one did for 15 years (1986–2002). Of the 23 task team leaders, six work for the Corps and seven work for the Engineer Research and Development Center (ERDC). In 10 out of the 15 volumes of the IPET draft final report, the majority of the team members were Corps of Engineers personnel. According to the IPET draft final report, IPET membership consisted of individuals from the Universities of Maryland, Florida, Notre Dame, and Virginia Polytechnic Institute, the National Oceanic and Atmospheric Administration, the South Florida Water Management District, Harris County Flood Control District (Houston, TX), the United States Department of Agriculture, and the United States Bureau of Reclamation as well as those from USACE.

=== American Society of Civil Engineers (ASCE) involvement ===
==== ASCE's press release contains wrong/conflicting information ====
On 1 June 2007, the American Society of Civil Engineers issued its External Peer Review (ERP) report, the peer review of the Corps-sponsored IPET as well as an accompanying press release. However, the press release was criticized because it contained information that was not present in the report, included information that conflicted with the report, and minimized the Army Corps' involvement in the catastrophe. The press release stated, "Even without breaching, Hurricane Katrina’s rainfall and surge overtopping would have caused extensive and severe flooding—and the worst loss of life and property loss ever experienced in New Orleans." Meanwhile, the ERP report stated that had levees and pump stations not failed, "far less property loss would have occurred and nearly two-thirds of deaths could have been avoided." This determination was on page 39 of an 80-page report. The New Orleans Times Picayune editorial board decried ASCE's press release.

==== Raymond Seed submits ethics complaint ====
In October 2007, Raymond Seed, a civil engineering professor at the University of California-Berkeley and an ASCE member submitted an ethics complaint to the ASCE which alleged that the Corps of Engineers, with the help of the ASCE, sought to minimize the Corps' mistakes in the flooding, intimidate anyone who tried to intervene, and delay the final results until the public's attention had turned elsewhere. The Corps acknowledged receiving a copy of the letter but has refused to comment until after the ASCE's Committee on Professional Conduct (CPC), led by Rich Hovey, comments on the complaint. It took over a year for the ASCE to announce the results of the CPC. When the results of the self-study were finally announced, the ASCE panel did not file any charges of ethical misconduct. They blamed their errors in their June press release on its creation by "staff level and not by review panel members."

==== Grassroots group posts satire of relationship between ASCE and USACE ====
In November 2007, Levees.Org posted a spoof on YouTube satirizing what it believed was an overly cozy relationship between the Army Corps of Engineers and the members of the ASCE's ERP. The video depicted money changing hands in an overstuffed brief case and ERP members covered with bling. The group contended that the ERP validating the IPET process was an apparent conflict of interest because the Corps selected the ASCE, directly paid the ASCE over $2 million and awarded the panel members Outstanding Civilian Service Medals (OCSM) before their work was complete.

The ASCE presented Levees.org with a threat of lawsuit if the group did not remove the video from YouTube. The group took it down while its leader Sandy Rosenthal examined options from response. Flanked by lawyers with Adams and Reese, the group ignored the threat and reposted the controversial video to YouTube citing Louisiana's Anti-SLAPP statute—a "strategic lawsuit against public participation"—which allows courts to weed out lawsuits designed to chill public participation on matters of public significance. In a response for comment, President David Mongan P.E. replied, "Since the video has already been widely reposted by other organizations, moving forward, we feel our time and expertise are best utilized working to help protect the residents of New Orleans from future storms and flooding."

==== Two panels are created to examine claims of ethics breaches ====
On 8 December 2007, the ASCE confirmed that it had launched two ethics investigations. One of them was an internal probe led by Rich Hovey to look into Dr. Ray Seed's claims in his 42-page ethics complaint accusing it of colluding with the Army Corps to cover up its engineering mistakes discovered after the 2005 hurricane struck.

The second was external and would look at the ethics of the ASCE receiving funds directly from those organizations selecting the ASCE for its peer reviews. The task force was chaired by the Honorable Sherwood L. Boehlert, former Chairman of the House Science Committee. The other participants are as follows: Joseph Bordogna, PhD, Former Deputy Director of the National Science Foundation; Jack W. Hoffbuhr, P.E., DEE, Former Executive Director of the American Water Works Association; Jack Snell, PhD, Former Director of the National Institute of Standards and Technology's Building and Fire Research Laboratory; William A. Wulf, PhD, Former President of the National Academy of Engineering.

On 12 September 2008, Congressman Boehlert released his investigative report on Dr. Ray Seed's allegations contained in his ethics complaint. The report, issued nearly nine months after their investigation began, criticized the ASCE for apparent conflicts of interest. The Boehlert Report made several major recommendations, the most important being that funding for peer reviews over $1 million should come from a separate source, like the National Institute of Standards and Technology (NIST). The report also recommended that the ASCE Headquarters should facilitate but not control the assessment teams, and that dissemination of information to the public and press not be under the extremely tight controls that Dr. Seed and his team experienced. The report concluded that ASCE should draw up an ethics policy to eliminate questions of possible conflicts of interest. The task force also acknowledged that the

"[P]otential conflicts of interest in ASCE's engineering review process are not unique to ASCE and can be addressed through procedures utilized by many government agencies charged with providing unbiased assessments to the public".

On 6 April 2009, the internal probe with the ASCE issued a report that ordered a retraction of the ASCE's 1 June 2007 press release. The panel determined that the press release "inadvertently conveyed a misleading impression regarding the role of engineering failures in the devastation of New Orleans." The release also incorrectly said that surge levels along Mississippi's coastline were higher than water levels caused by a tsunami in the Indian Ocean in 2004, and incorrectly repeated estimates of deaths and property damage that might have occurred in New Orleans if levees and floodwalls hadn't been breached.

=== Design problems and mechanisms of failure ===
On 5 April 2006, months after independent investigators had demonstrated that the levee failures were not due to natural forces beyond intended design strength, Lt. Gen. Carl Strock testified before the U.S. Senate Subcommittee on Energy and Water that, "We have now concluded we had problems with the design of the structure." He also testified that the Corps of Engineers did not know of this mechanism of failure prior to 29 August 2005. The claim of ignorance is refuted by the National Science Foundation investigators hired by the Army Corps of Engineers, who point to a 1986 study (E-99 study) by the corps itself that such separations were possible in the I-wall design.[28] This issue is addressed again in a study released in August 2015 by J. David Rogers et al. who concluded that a misinterpretation of the 1986 study occurred apparently because the Corps had draped a tarpaulin over the gap that formed between the bases of the deflecting sheet piles and the soil in which they were embedded, so they did not see the gap. The tarpaulin was there for safety and to stop water that would seep through the interlocks. Failure to include the gap in interpretation of the test results introduced unconservatism in the final designs based on these tests. It allowed the use of shorter sheet piles, and reduced overall flood protection reliability.

== Ivor van Heerden ==
=== Team Louisiana investigation report ===
Scientists from LSU and from the private sector conducted a forensic investigation of the levee failures. Commissioned by the Louisiana State Department of Transportation and Development (DOTD), it was led by Dr. Ivor van Heerden, Deputy Director of the LSU Hurricane Center, and released in 2007. They found that the hurricane protection system was not properly conceived to accomplish the 1965 Congressional mandate to protect against the "most severe combination of meteorological conditions reasonably expected," and they highlighted many other shortcomings in the hurricane protection system creation practices. It recommended independent review of levee projects, among other suggestions.

=== Lawsuit against Louisiana State University (LSU) ===
On 9 April 2009 LSU announced it was firing Ivor van Heerden, effective the end of the spring semester 2010. Van Heerden said he was not offered any reason. A criticism from a retired corps employee was that van Heerden, a geologist, had allegedly offered "engineering services" or had represented himself "as an engineer publicly without having a professional engineer's license" and consequently was a legal liability for his employer, LSU. On 10 February 2010, Dr. Van Heerden filed a wrongful termination lawsuit in Louisiana state court alleging that LSU officials waged a campaign of retaliation against him that culminated with the termination of his position with the university. He settled with the university shortly after embarrassing emails were made public. The emails traded between members of the Louisiana Governor's office and LSU officials three weeks after Katrina revealed an apparent early plan to muzzle Dr. Ivor van Heerden when he blamed the Army Corps of Engineers for most of the New Orleans area flooding during Katrina. Dr. Van Heerden settled for $435,000. The university spent nearly a million dollars fighting the legal case.

== Public relations ==
In 2007, the New Orleans District hired a PR firm, Outreach Process Partners (OPP), allegedly to develop educational materials and set up public meetings that the Corps is required by law to hold in order to get feedback from residents about corps' projects. The total cost of the PR contract was $5,200,000.

In May 2009, an internet blogger discovered that OPP had a bar graph on its website that boasted how it helped reduce negative news coverage that plagued the Corps following Hurricane Katrina. The group Levees.org publicly stated that corps' should not be spending taxpayer dollars trying to repair its reputation.

== Internet scandal ==
In December 2008, Sandy Rosenthal leader of the group Levees.org called a New Orleans CBS affiliate television station and offered to give them an exclusive to publicize several incidents in which employees of the corps used taxpayer-funded computers to post derogatory blog comments deriding citizen activists' efforts. In response to the news story, the U.S. Army Corps of Engineers described the event as an isolated incident. Three days after the incident was publicized, the Commander of the New Orleans District of the Corps of Engineers, Colonel Alvin Lee, issued a formal apology. "Please accept my apology for the unprofessional comments someone in my District posted to your web site," said the letter. "I have reinforced with my entire staff that this was an inappropriate and unacceptable use of our computers and time."

On 23 June 2009, US Senator Mary Landrieu issued this statement to WWL TV Eyewitness News in New Orleans with regard to the scandal:

"I am very concerned by the reports that a number of Corps employees have engaged in a disingenuous campaign to undercut their critics in Louisiana", Landrieu said. "My staff and I will continue to review these allegations and will urge Pentagon officials to thoroughly review this matter".

On 29 September 2009, the Department of Defense Inspector General's Office has closed its investigation. "We believe that (corps New Orleans District office) officials took appropriate actions once informed of the allegations at issue," Assistant Inspector General John Crane said in a letter to U.S. Sen. Mary Landrieu, D-La. "Accordingly, further review by this agency is not warranted." Those actions included strongly worded messages to corps employees telling them comments that demeaned corps critics were not allowed. In addition, access to the site of the Levees.org group was blocked from corps computers, preventing employees from commenting there. Lastly, the employee of a contractor—who was a former corps employee himself and was identified as using a government computer to post disparaging remarks on NOLA.com—was barred from working on corps projects.

== Environmental challenges ==
=== Debate over type of flood protection ===
Different types of hurricane protection were proposed to protect the southern Louisiana region.

Between 1970 and 1975, the Corps developed a plan for massive sea gates for the region east of New Orleans that would prevent storm surge from flowing through Lake Borgne and into Lake Pontchartrain through the Rigolets and Chef Menteur passes. Referred to as the Barrier Plan, it included a series of levees along the lake Gulf Intracoastal Waterway (GIWW), a navigable inland waterway. A small group, led by Luke Fontana, filed a lawsuit against the Barrier Plan in 1976 over the Corps' Environmental Impact Study (EIS). In Save our Wetlands v Rush, the plaintiffs claimed that the Corps' EIS did not meet the requirements of Section 102 of the National Environmental Policy Act (NEPA). The court agreed with Fontana noting, among other things, that the EIS was based on obsolete data and that the Corps' biological analysis 'relied entirely on a single telephone conversation with a marine biologist.' Judge Charles Schwartz issued an injunction preventing further progress on the barrier option until the Corps revised its EIS. However, the Corps did not return and, in 1980, concluded that an alternative option of higher levees providing hurricane protection was less costly, less damaging to the environment and more acceptable to local interests

After Katrina, the controversy was revisited, with some blaming the lack of the massive barriers – and the environmentalists – for the storm's destruction. But Corps' officials told the Government Accountability Office that "if they had gone ahead with the floodgate plan, Katrina's devastation would have been even worse, because the barriers would not have been large enough to keep the storm surge out of the lake – and the levees around the city would have been even lower."

== Lawsuits issues in New Orleans ==
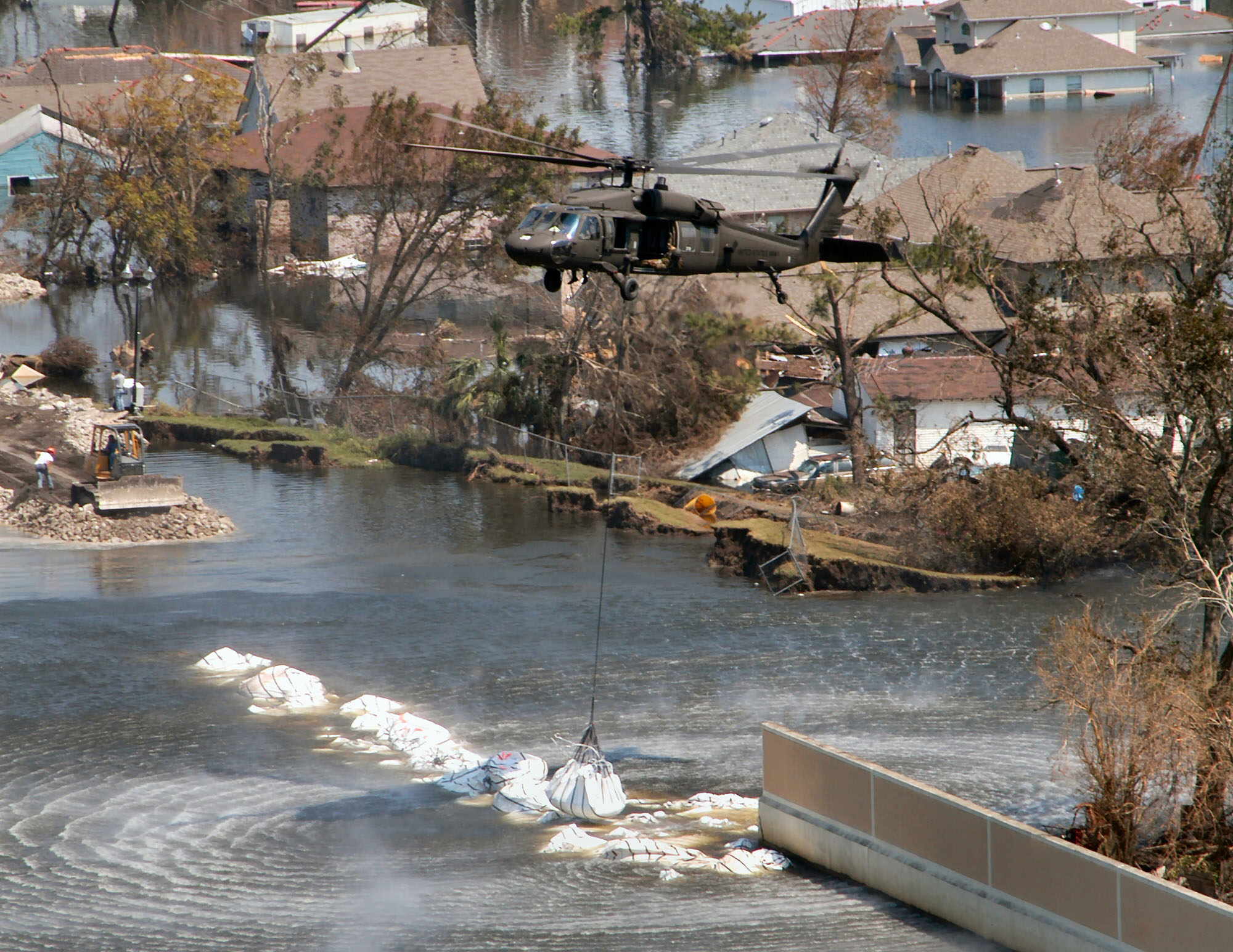
A Texas Army National Guard Sikorsky UH-60 Blackhawk deposits a 6,000+ pound bag of sand and gravel to close the breach in the 17th Street Canal, New Orleans, 4 September 2005.

In March 2007, the City of New Orleans filed a $77 billion claim against the USACE for damages sustained from faulty levee construction and resultant flooding during Hurricane Katrina. Of this amount, only $1 billion was designated as direct "infrastructure damages"; the rest was attributed to consequential damages such as industry losses and the city's tarnished image. Hundreds of thousands of individual claims were received in the Corps' New Orleans District office. In addition to the City of New Orleans, other claimants include Entergy New Orleans, the city's electric utility, and New Orleans Sewerage and Water Board.

In February 2007 U.S. District Court Judge Stan Duval ruled that the Flood Control Act of 1928 did not apply to cases involving navigational projects. He ruled that the Corps may be sued over alleged defects in its Mississippi River-Gulf Outlet navigation channel. Immunity for cases involving flood levees was apparently not addressed at that time.

On 30 January 2008, Judge Duval ruled that even though the US Army Corps of Engineers was negligent and derelict in their duty to provide flood protection for the citizens of New Orleans, he was compelled to dismiss a class action lawsuit filed against the Corps for levee breaches after Hurricane Katrina. He cited the Flood Control Act of 1928 which, among other actions, provided protection to the federal government from lawsuits when flood control projects like levees break.

While the United States government is immune for legal liability for the defalcations alleged herein, it is not free, nor should it be, from posterity's judgment concerning its failure to accomplish what was its task. This story—50 years in the making—is heart-wrenching. Millions of dollars were squandered in building a levee system with respect to these outfall canals which was known to be inadequate by the corps's own calculations.

Duval's decision left the New Orleans Sewerage & Water Board and Orleans Levee District as defendants in the lawsuit. The dismissal of the lawsuit also denied about 489,000 claims by businesses, government entities, and residents, seeking trillions of dollars in damages against the Corps, which were pinned to the suit and a similar one filed over flooding from a navigation channel in St. Bernard Parish. It was unclear how many claims could still move forward. The plaintiffs vowed to appeal to the United States Court of Appeals for the Fifth Circuit.

On 19 November 2009, the Court found the Army Corps responsible for the flooding by not properly maintaining the Mississippi River-Gulf Outlet Canal (MRGO). Judge Duval said that the "Corps had an opportunity to take a myriad of actions to alleviate this deterioration or rehabilitate this deterioration and failed to do so." Duval ruled in favor of five of the six plaintiffs, awarding those from Lower Ninth Ward and St. Bernard Parish between $100,000 and $317,000 in damages. Duval, however, ruled against a couple from New Orleans East. In his decision, Duval wrote that the Corps was aware that deteriorating conditions of the canal would affect the levees in St. Bernard Parish and the Lower Ninth Ward neighborhoods. Duval awarded a total of $719,000 to the five plaintiffs but the decision leaves the U.S. government open to additional lawsuits from those affected. A spokesman for the Corps indicated the matter would be appealed, up to and including the U.S. Supreme Court. In April 2019, a federal appeals court overturned the decision, saying that the plaintiffs failed to prove that construction or operation of the outlet caused the flooding.

== See also ==
- U.S. Army Corps of Engineers civil works controversies
- 2005 levee failures in Greater New Orleans
- Flood Control Act of 1965
- Criticism of the government response to Hurricane Katrina
- Political effects of Hurricane Katrina
- Reconstruction of New Orleans
- When the Levees Broke (film)
- Civil engineering and infrastructure repair in New Orleans after Hurricane Katrina
- London Avenue Canal
- 17th Street Canal
- Industrial Canal
