= The Parking Garage =

- Seinfeld episode
- Episode no.: Season 3 Episode 6
- Directed by: Tom Cherones
- Written by: Larry David
- Production code: 306
- Original air date: October 30, 1991

Guest appearance
- Cynthia Ettinger as Michele

Episode chronology
← Previous "The Library"	Next → "The Cafe"
- Seinfeld season 3

"The Parking Garage" is the 23rd episode of the situation comedy Seinfeld. It was the sixth episode of the show's third season. It aired on October 30, 1991 on NBC.

Written by Larry David and directed by Tom Cherones, the episode takes place entirely in a parking garage. It received overwhelmingly positive reviews, and was ranked #33 on TV Guide's 1997 list of the 100 Greatest TV episodes of All Time. It received a 12.1/19 Nielsen rating.

== Plot ==
The group goes to a New Jersey shopping mall for cheap air conditioners, but Kramer alone gets the last one. As they leave, they end up stranded in the multi-level parking garage in search of Kramer's car. Elaine needs to get her new goldfish home, George is due to chaperone his parents for their wedding anniversary, and Jerry, having failed to find a bathroom, needs to urinate. After many false sightings of the car, they lose both direction and hope. Struggling to carry the air conditioner, Kramer stows it behind a random car.

Elaine's fish are succumbing to suffocation, but her pleas to hitch rides with random strangers to search for Kramer's car fall on deaf ears. Jerry is disgusted by Kramer's suggestion to urinate discreetly in the garage, but grows desperate enough to do so, and is caught by a security guard, leaving the others to search for both him and the car. Jerry makes up outlandish excuses for his misdemeanor, claiming to suffer the fictional, deadly disease of "uromysitisis", and passing off George's predicament—embellished unbelievably—as his own. Thanks to Jerry's lies, when George, too, is caught urinating on Kramer's advice, the same guard disbelieves his story.

After being fined, Jerry and George reunite with Elaine, whose aggravation at apathetic bystanders nearly draws the ire of two bodybuilders. George is persuaded to hitch a ride with an attractive woman with a pick-up line, and succeeds. She graciously chauffeurs the group, but George unwittingly offends her belief in Scientology and she throws them out—next to Kramer's car, by chance, but with Kramer still missing. Finally retrieving his air conditioner, Kramer arrives much too late to salvage Elaine's fish or George's obligations. They all get in the car, but the engine fails to start.

== Production ==
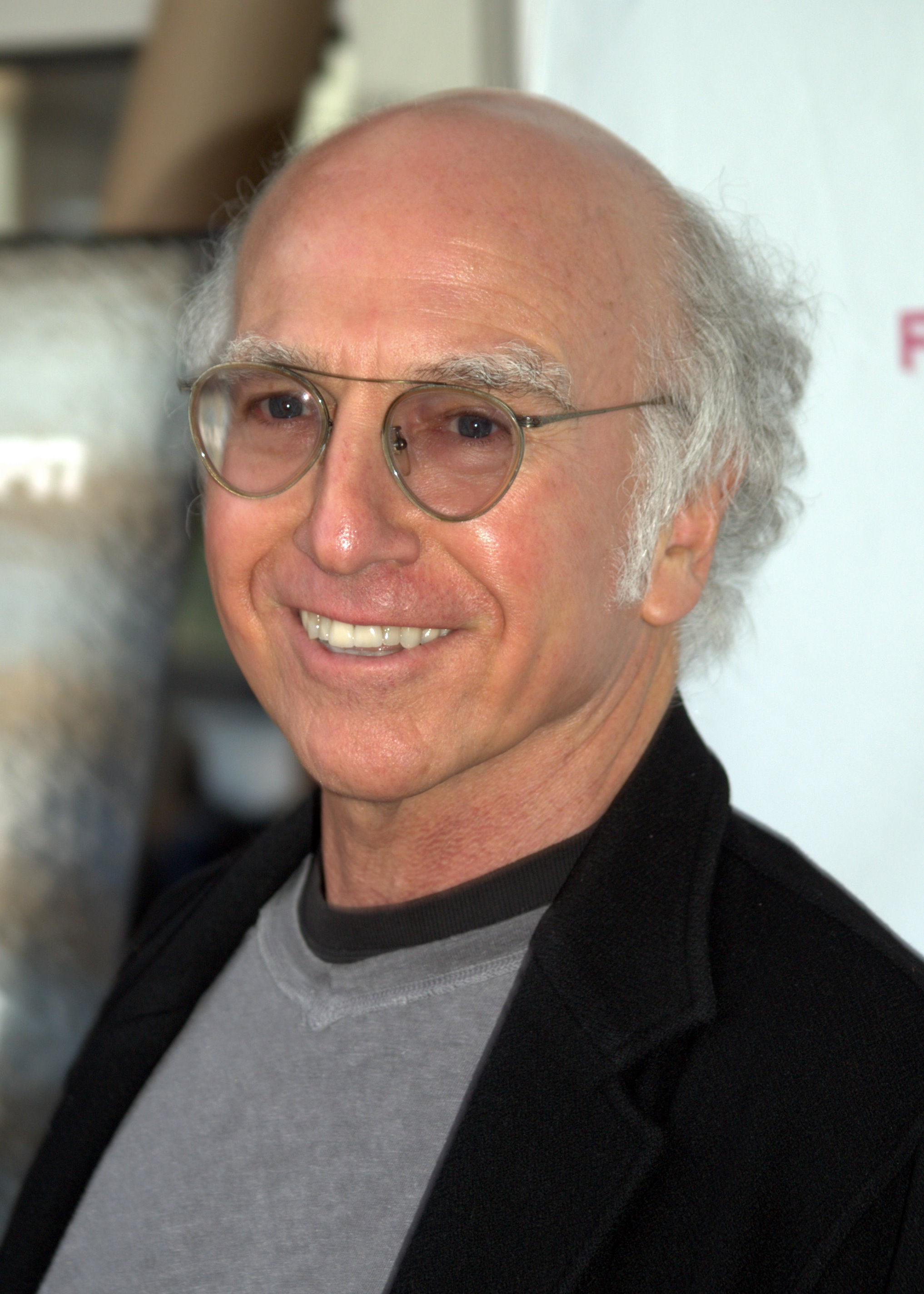
Series co-creator Larry David wrote the episode.

The Parking Garage was written by Larry David, his fourth writing credit for the season, and was directed by Tom Cherones, his fourth directing credit for the season. It was filmed on the normal Seinfeld soundstage. The audience bleachers, Jerry's apartment and the restaurant set were removed to make room for the new set. Shooting was done from different angles so the entire set was shown. The stage was surrounded by mirrors to make the garage appear larger. Louis-Dreyfus and Seinfeld had their makeup redone between takes while lying on the ground because the shoot was so demanding.

Because Michael Richards wanted the shoot to be as realistic as possible, he insisted that an actual air conditioner be placed in the box Kramer was to carry around, so that Kramer's struggles were actually real. This got taxing as the shoot went on, and Richards also cut his lip while trying to load the air conditioner into his car.

The ending was scripted to have the gang drive off together and search vainly for the exit; the car failing to start at the end of the episode was an accident. Richards continued to crank the car's ignition without success. It was decided that it was a much funnier ending, and it was kept in the episode as something else gone wrong. As Richards attempts to start the car, the other cast members can be seen turning their backs to the camera, trying to hide their laughter.

== Theme ==
The episode follows the premise of the idea of Seinfeld as a "show about nothing". Holly Ordway of DVD Talk compared it to "The Chinese Restaurant" from the second season, which takes place entirely in a Chinese restaurant.

== Reception ==
In its original American broadcast, "The Parking Garage" received a Nielsen rating of 12.1 rating/19% share—this means that 12.1% of American households watched the episode and 19% of televisions in use at the time were tuned to it.

=== Critical response ===
The episode has received overwhelmingly positive reviews from critics with many saying it is better than "The Chinese Restaurant". Holly Ordway called the episode "another classic Seinfeld episode" and also stated "the characters spend the whole episode in the same place resulting in an episode that's both memorable and funny." She also said it was better than second season's "The Chinese Restaurant". Colin Jacobson of DVD Movie Guide said "À la Season Two's "The Chinese Restaurant", this program uses one commonplace setting for its comedy, and I think it works even better than its famed predecessor".

Matthew Bond, describing how "singleness and childlessness" were, at the time the series began, "unusual for a situation comedy", writes:

the Peter Pans of this series view all other children as competition and those who have children—i.e., their peers who are parents—as fools. In 'The Parking Garage,' George intervenes when a mother hits her son; the mother tells him to mind his own business. When George asserts that it is his business, the son tells George that he's ugly.

Bond concludes, "In the Seinfeld world, others are unwelcome; parents are oppressive; friends married or with children are buffoons; children are monsters. Why should Jerry and Our Gang grow up?"
