= Ivor van Heerden =

American marine scientist

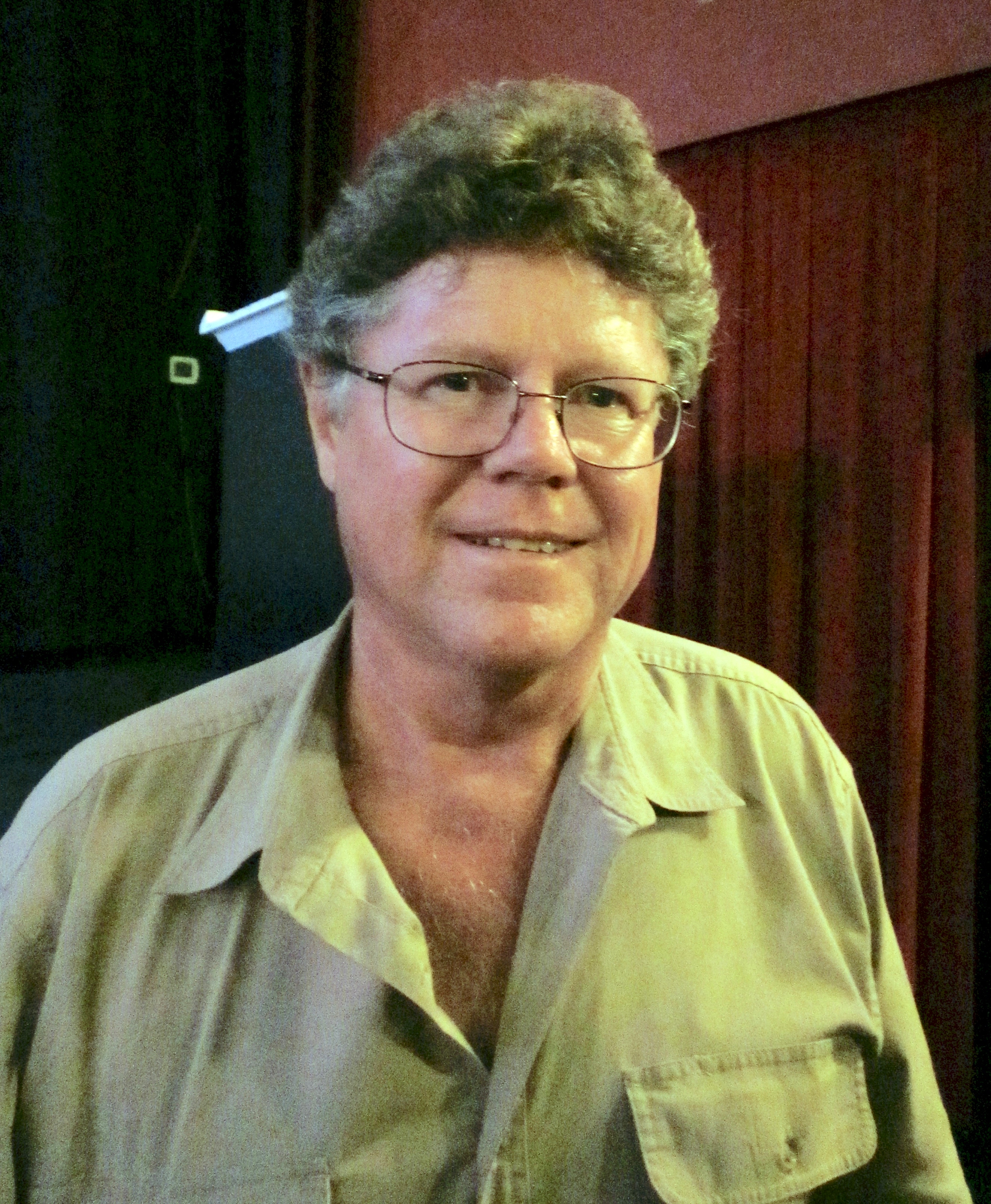
- Born: Johannesburg, South Africa
- Education: Louisiana State University
- Known for: Work on Hurricane Katrina, Hurricane Pam simulation
- Scientific career
- Fields: Marine science
- Workplaces: Louisiana State University

Ivor van Heerden is a South African-born American scientist, recognized for his work in the marine sciences and his significant contributions in the field of hurricane research. He was the deputy director of the Louisiana State University (LSU) Hurricane Center; however his tenure at LSU ended in 2010, when he was dismissed by the university under controversial circumstances following his criticism of the handling of Hurricane Katrina.

== Biography ==
Van Heerden was born in Johannesburg, South Africa. He completed his doctoral degree in marine sciences from Louisiana State University and later went on to establish a hurricane modeling program at LSU. For the last decade, he has been one of the most persistent voices warning of the inevitable effects of a major hurricane on the Louisiana coast. He participated in the Hurricane Pam exercise in July 2004, asserting that his recommendations were overlooked, a neglect which he argues exacerbated the Hurricane Katrina disaster.

Van Heerden is also known for his criticism of the United States Army Corps of Engineers (USACE), attributing the 2005 levee failures in New Orleans to their faulty design and execution. This controversy was further fueled when LSU instructed him to avoid media engagements, raising concerns that his book The Storm might jeopardize federal grant money directed to the university.

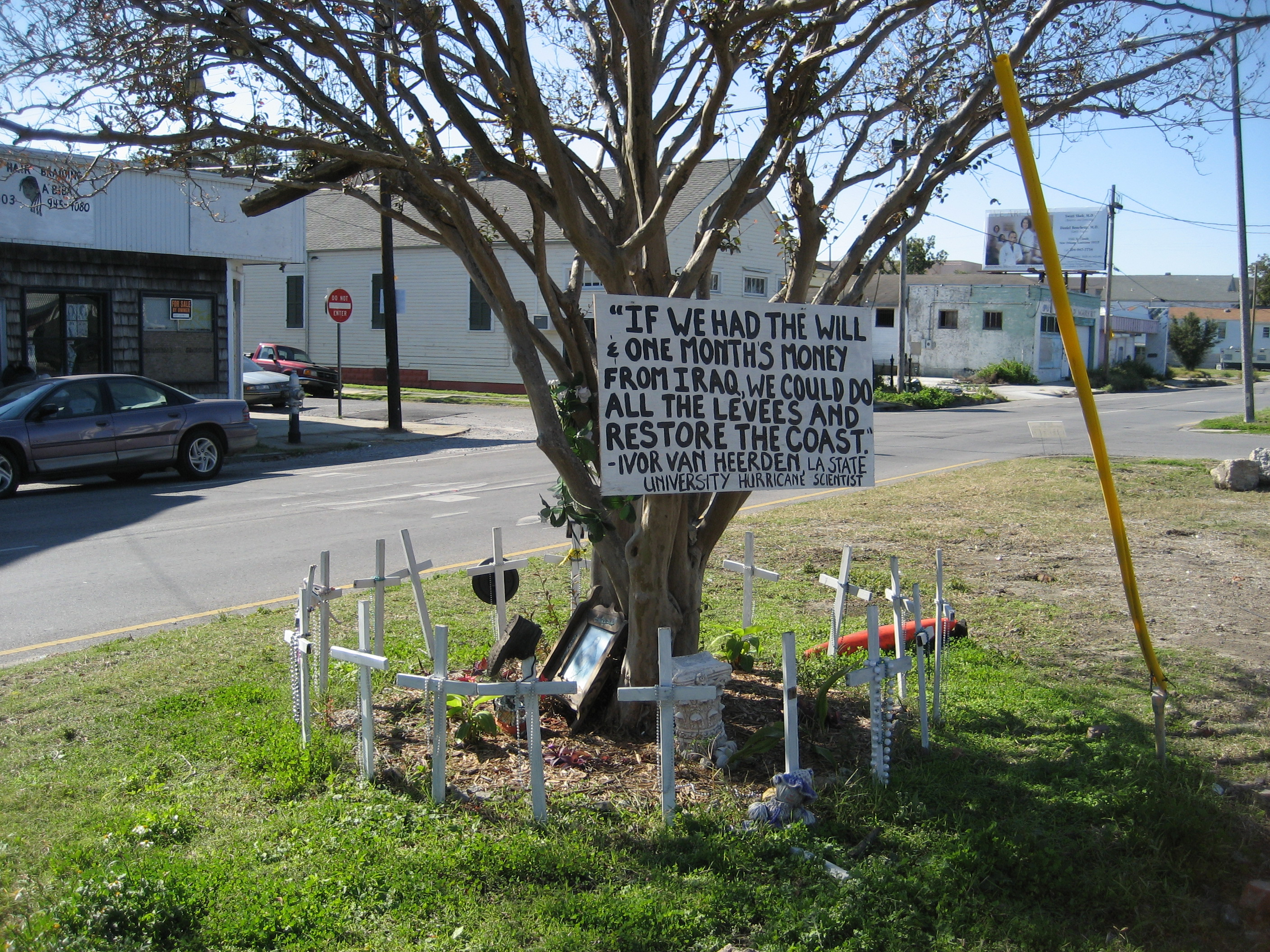
A quote from Van Heerden is on this neighborhood memorial to Katrina dead in the Bywater section of New Orleans

=== Termination from LSU and subsequent lawsuit ===
On 9 April 2009, LSU announced its decision to terminate van Heerden's position, effective at the end of the spring semester. Van Heerden said the university did not offer a reason for this action. In a subsequent interview with Harry Shearer on his Le Show radio program, van Heerden revealed that he learned about his dismissal from news media and was never personally informed. This sudden termination raised serious academic freedom concerns and sparked protests from faculty members and students at LSU. It was speculated that the termination was related to van Heerden's public criticism of the U.S. Army Corps of Engineers after Hurricane Katrina, an action which could have placed LSU's funding at risk.

One of the criticisms leveled at van Heerden came from a retired corps employee, who claimed that van Heerden, a geologist, had allegedly offered "engineering services" or had represented himself "as an engineer publicly without having a professional engineer's license". This was seen as a potential legal liability for LSU.

Van Heerden, however, found strong support in the Louisiana press, with scathing criticisms of LSU's administration appearing in major newspapers like the New Orleans Times-Picayune, from James A. Cobb Jr., attorney and adjunct professor in LSU-rival Tulane University's School of Law, whose letter to the editor ended thus:

Academic freedom and intellectual integrity are, at LSU, like two distant cousins who haven't spoken to each other in many, many years.

— Flagship university? Please.

In an interview with the New York Times, van Heerden voiced suspicion that his "slow-motion" dismissal was strategically timed with the opening of a multibillion-dollar lawsuit against the US Army Corps of Engineers over the Mississippi River-Gulf Outlet Canal (MR-GO), where he was expected to testify.

On February 10, 2010, van Heerden filed a wrongful termination lawsuit against LSU, alleging retaliation by university officials. The lawsuit ended in a settlement after emails between the Louisiana Governor's office and LSU officials were made public, indicating an early plan to silence van Heerden after his criticisms of the Army Corps of Engineers. The emails were exchanged three weeks after Katrina, and were in response to van Heerden blaming the Army Corps of Engineers for most of the New Orleans area flooding during Katrina. The settlement amounted to $435,000, while the university's legal expenses approached an additional half million dollars.

== Quotes ==
- "What bothers me the most is all the people who've died unnecessarily."
- "Those FEMA officials wouldn't listen to me. Those Corps of Engineers people giggled in the back of the room when we tried to present information."
- When it was suggested that tents be prepared. "Their response to me was: 'Americans don't live in tents,' and that was about it."
- "As a nation, let's take up the 'Rebuild!' battle cry. Now is the time to put politics, egos, turf wars and profit agendas aside. We owe it to the thirteen hundred Americans who died in the Katrina tragedy. We owe it to their survivors and to all future generations. It's now or never."
