= The Cafe (Seinfeld) =

- Seinfeld episode
- Episode no.: Season 3 Episode 7
- Directed by: Tom Cherones
- Written by: Tom Leopold
- Production code: 307
- Original air date: November 6, 1991

Guest appearances
- Brian George as Babu Bhatt; Dawn Arnemann as Monica

Episode chronology
← Previous "The Parking Garage"	Next → "The Tape"
- Seinfeld season 3

"The Cafe" is the 24th episode of Seinfeld. The episode was the seventh episode of the show's third season. It aired on November 6, 1991, on NBC.

== Plot ==
George agrees to take an IQ test for his girlfriend Monica's master's research, but this triggers his insecurity about his intelligence, dating back to his secretly shameful SAT score. Jerry recalls George's legendary feat of cheating by passing test papers through a classroom window, egging him on to repeat this with the help of Elaine, who boasts of an IQ of 145.

Jerry obsessively surveils The Dream Café, a new restaurant across the street, where Babu Bhatt, the Pakistani proprietor, canvasses for customers in vain. Patronizingly concerned for the restaurant, Jerry dines there and is lavished with praise by Babu, who serves many incongruous non-Pakistani cuisines all on the same menu.

Elaine brings George's test to the empty restaurant, for quiet. She is distracted by Kramer's nosiness and his pratfall over Babu's scaldingly hot face towels, and Babu's singing. After Jerry obliges her to order food, the test papers are ruined by a spill as Babu clears away the still-uneaten meal.

Ego-tripping off Babu's gratitude, Jerry advises him to serve his native cuisine and run the only Pakistani restaurant in the neighborhood. Revisiting the remodeled, but still empty, restaurant later, Jerry is proudly oblivious to Babu's now-cold demeanor until Babu rages that he has deeper indebted himself, on Jerry's advice, for nothing. The restaurant closes down.

George improbably explains away the food spill, to Monica's fascination, but George and Elaine are both humiliated by scoring only 85. To redeem herself, Elaine pushes George to redo the test. Elaine retakes the test in peace at Jerry's apartment, but gets locked inside when Kramer takes refuge in the apartment, cornered by his mother's ex-boyfriend over Kramer's refusal to return a jacket the man left two years ago (introduced in the previous episode). Kramer fails to keep the jacket. Monica catches George without the test, but Elaine still turns in her answers and is vindicated by scoring 151.
