= Le Show =

- Genre: News commentary, comedy, music
- Running time: 59 minutes
- Country of origin: USA
- Language: English
- Home station: KCRW (1983–14 April 2013); WWNO (14 April 2013-present); KCSN (14 July 2013–present)
- Starring: Harry Shearer
- Recording studio: Santa Monica, California, New Orleans, Louisiana et al.
- Original release: December 3, 1983
- Audio format: Stereo
- Website: http://harryshearer.com/le-show/
- Podcast: http://wwno.org/feeds/3580/rss.xml

Le Show is a weekly syndicated public radio show hosted by satirist Harry Shearer. The program is a hodgepodge of satirical news commentary, music, and sketch comedy. Shearer, an impressionist known for his voice work on The Simpsons, writes the sketches and usually performs all the voices.

== History ==
The show first aired on December 3, 1983, and ran under various titles for several months before Le Show at the suggestion of a long-time friend of the host. A satire of a popular marketing trend at the time to add "Le" to product names such as the Renault 5 which was heavily promoted in the US as Le Car.

Until April 14, 2013, for almost 30 years, Le Show usually originated live on Sunday mornings from "The Le Show Dome" (its reference for the studios) at KCRW in Santa Monica ("The city known around the world", Shearer says in his sign off, "as the home… of the homeless"). It is also frequently recorded at or broadcast from other NPR and public stations when Shearer is on the road. After the KCRW broadcast on April 14, 2013, KCRW moved the program from broadcast to webcast only. While the show continues to air on numerous other sources, primarily public radio stations (listed at the end of each show), Shearer expressed dismay over losing his home base radio broadcast, without any notice or being allowed to say goodbye on the air. Shearer has since ended each program by stating that Le Show originated from the "'Change is Hard' Radio Network", referring to a press statement from KCRW announcing the show's departure from its lineup. At the beginning of the July 14, 2013 episode, Shearer announced that the program is now airing on KCSN, bringing the show back to the Southern California airwaves roughly three months after it was taken off the air at KCRW. While KCSN provides live streaming of the show as well as the archives thereof, WWNO in New Orleans has taken over hosting its broadcast and podcast feeds. In Shearer's eyes, this prompted the change to the "'Change is Easy' Radio Network" (referring to the city's nickname "The Big Easy").

Several shows a year are broadcast from New Orleans, where Shearer has a residence. The New Orleans shows usually feature very prominent local musicians.

== Availability ==
The program is carried on many NPR and other public radio stations throughout the US and abroad. It is also available internationally on NPR Worldwide, the American Forces Radio Network, USEN440 in Japan and over shortwave radio via WBCQ The Planet (7490 kHz). Since the merger of the XM and Sirius satellite radio services into SiriusXM Satellite Radio, the program is no longer available on the merged service; on which Shearer commented, "because I guess, you know, mergers are good". The program also aired on NPR Berlin from its launch in 2006 through to its 2017 shutdown; it was not picked up by its successor, KCRW Berlin.

The show is also available as podcasts of previous episodes from Shearer's website and as free downloadable files from Audible.com, The show is also available as a podcast on iTunes along with other KCRW programs, although KCRW no longer broadcasts the show. The podcasts differ from the broadcast and streaming versions, in that they generally include only a few seconds of the music Shearer spins for the show. Exceptions are musical parodies and original songs written and performed by Shearer.

You say what you want to say without the expectation it’ll make any difference. Say what you want to say because you gotta say it, not because you think it’s going to change anything. Sometimes you might be pleasantly surprised, but most often, things go the way they go.

== News segments ==
The show features a number of recurring news segments, each referred to by Shearer as "a copyrighted feature of this broadcast". Currently many episodes include the following:

- "Apologies of the Week" (public apologies reported in the news)
- "News From Outside the Bubble" (News stories from international sources, usually the UK)
- "News of the Warm" (Shearer reads news on global warming)
- "The Trades" (Shearer reads items from trade magazines)
- "News of Inspectors General" (News reports of the findings of U.S. Government Inspectors General)

Other news features that recur less often on the program include:

- "News of the Olympic Movement" (news about Olympic snafus)
- "Burying the Lede" (News stories with alarming tidbits buried down in the story)
- "News of the Atom" (News of safety issues in the nuclear power industry)
- "News of the Godly" (News items relating to religion and evangelism)
- "Musk Love" (News about the World's Richest Man, Elon Musk)--using The Captain & Tenille version of "Muskrat Love" with the word "rat" edited out of the chorus.
- "F is for FEMA" (News stories concerning the Federal Emergency Management Agency (FEMA)—usually showcasing some aspect of incompetence—particularly focusing on the Hurricane Katrina aftermath)
- "Found Object Department" (Shearer plays audio from network feeds that was not intended to air)
- "Leak of the Week" (Starting about March 2013, a weekly report of oil leaks.)
- "Let's Get Scared" (Shearer reads news stories with frightening implications)
- "Los Angeles Dog Trainer Corrections" (Shearer reads the extensive and often unusual LA Times errata)
- "News from the Digital Wonderland" (News items, usually negative, concerning the switch-over from analog to digital transmission systems)
- "Sos of the Week" (instances of the word so being used to start a sentence in news programs)
- "Tales of Airport Security" (sent in by listeners)
- "News of News Corp." (Shearer updates the latest stories about the News Corporation scandal)
  - On the October 16, 2011 episode, Shearer renamed the segment "News of Nice Corp." "... because it's not anymore misleading than ..."
- "News of Secrets" Started on March 16, 2014, as News of Secret Stuff, renamed April 13, Shearer discusses material governments try to keep from public view.
- "News of Transparency" Backhanded compliments, failed examples of how the Obama Administration lives up to its announced goal of being the most transparent administration in history.
- "The Year in Rebuke" (The last one or two shows of each year feature repeats of key news-related items, songs and sketches from that year)

== Comedy segments ==
There are many recurring comedy sketches or parodies on the program.

=== Continental Public Radio ===
Shearer often parodies the other programming found on public radio, often as part of a fictional "Continental Public Radio" (CPR). These are populated with such personalities as host Aviva Schlorman, reporter Ira Zipkin, political editor Jonathan Ziziks and others, all voiced by Shearer. Recurring parodies include:

- "All in All" "CPR's weekly attempt to bring what's behind the news in front of the news and leave it there"
- "At Loggerheads" "Dichotomous dialogue from both sides of the rhetorical divide" (debates on news topics)
- "Book Bag" (Book review program hosted by Ira Zipkin)
- "The Edible Table" (Lampoon of public radio shows such as The Splendid Table)
- "Karzai Talk" (Call-in chat show, a satire of NPR's Car Talk using the fictional Afghanistan Public Radio starring President Hamid Karzai and his brother Ahmed Wali Karzai; After the 2011 assassination of "Wali", another brother Mahmud Karzai became the co-host. The title and style of the show lampoon NPR's Car Talk, of which Shearer has been critical) In 2014 Shearer promoted Karzai Talk T-shirts.
- "Media Nation" "CPR's weekly look into the world of the media and the media of the world" (host Chris Edwards is clearly intended to mimic Bob Edwards)
- "More Than You Know" "The weekly public radio series that focuses on events and personalities outside your ken", host: Jacob Kitzle
- "Mouth to Mouth" "An audio encounter with a personality in or out of the news" (Interview program)
- "News from Lake Reverie" (A parody of the "News from Lake Wobegon" segment of A Prairie Home Companion)
- "Up To Here" (Daily news & politics program) "A daily once-over not so lightly on the story at the top, of what's behind, today's news", hosted by Milton Getzler
- "What Up, Dog?" "News blogozine for the young and the newsless"; host: Cody Outscoop (Parodies NPR's attempts to reach younger audiences such as Bryant Park Project)

=== Presidential or political parodies ===
Among the many presidential and political parodies are:

- "Alternative Scenario Playhouse" "Duelling dramatizations from radio's premiere venue of bifurcated possibilities" (Shearer re-enacts two possible versions of events behind the news)
- "Clintonsomething" ("Youthful angst and middle-aged power!" — a thirtysomething parody) Retired at the end of the Clinton administration, reprised as "Clintonsomething: The State Department Years" with the appointment of Hillary Clinton as Secretary of State
- "Dick Cheney: Confidential" (parody of hard-boiled detective stories)
- "Father Knows Best" (parody of the 1950s television program, with Barack Obama as the father)
- "41 calls 43" (George H. W. Bush calls George W. Bush)
- "The Gore Room" (Al Gore and Al Franken host a liberal talk radio show; dropped after the liberal Air America radio network, featuring Al Franken, began broadcasting)
- "Hellcats Of The White House" (soap opera parody tales from the Reagan White House, followed by "Hellcats Of The White House: The Bel-Air Years")
- "Newt Gingrich calls his mom"
- "Nixon in Heaven"

=== Other sketches ===
Other recurring comedy sketches include:

- "Bad Day at Black Rock" (behind-the-scenes parody of CBS News, the title references a 1955 movie)
- "(Inside) Extra Access Tonight" (lampoon of various entertainment news shows)
- "Entrepod" (A podcast about startups)
- "Health File" (Medical radio program hosted by new age physician Dr. Manfred Weichner)
- "Larry King Live" (Parody of the CNN program)
- "Mind Your Own Business" (Business news radio program hosted "from the trading floor" by Mike Tutinello)
- "The O'Reilly Factor" (Parody of the Fox News Channel program)
- "Strictly from Blackwell" (Mr. Blackwell presents a show from Beverly Hills). Retired after Blackwell's death.
- "Super Bugs" (stories about antibiotic-resistant bacteria with Superfly-styled theme song, new feature as of October 2011)

=== Comedy interviews ===
Shearer will interview someone in-studio or via telephone. For the phone interviews, he claims to be opening up the phone for listener calls (even though no phone number was announced) or will reveal that there is an incoming call on "the newsmaker line". These are among the few comedy segments in which voices other than Shearer's are heard. Many are voiced by writer Tom Leopold, who has worked with Shearer on several other projects. These include:

- "Tony Bellalaqua" (a listener in the midwest)
- "Lyle Condit" (Congressman Gary Condit's youngest brother)
- "David Feldman" (A high school teacher and friend of Monica Lewinsky)
- "Yvonne Della Femina" (a multiple-sex-change recipient with a storied past)
- "John Walker Lindh" (the so-called "American Taliban")
- "Elvis Presley" (on the issuance of his U.S. postage stamp)
- "Ira Rifleman" (a listener who allegedly bought a truck owned by Scott Peterson who was convicted of the murder of his wife Laci Peterson)
- "Tyler Michael Tucker" (an actor from a failed TV program)

Other personalities not voiced by Leopold include:

- "David Manning" (the fictitious film reviewer, voiced by a computer voice synthesizer)
- "Ralph the Talking Computer" (a computer synthesized voice)
- "Barry Saint-Martin" aka "Barry Saint-Michael" (actor Alex Lowe)
- "Shabshab" (a former Saddam Hussein lookalike and stereo salesman in Iraq voiced by Shearer)

On very rare occasions Shearer has announced a phone number and taken actual listener calls.

== Interview segments ==
A few times each year the show will feature Shearer conducting a serious interview as a major segment of the program, often with a musician who will play music as well. Sometimes these interviews will comprise the bulk of the program, other times they will be interspersed with the usual mix of other segments.

=== Musician interviews ===
Musicians are often pianists associated with New Orleans and will appear on one of the programs Shearer records in that city. They have included:

- Marcia Ball
- Henry Butler
- Evan Christopher
- Jon Cleary
- Joe Krown
- Phillip Manuel
- Tom McDermott
- Judith Owen (Shearer's wife, who also sings on some of the original comedic songs heard on the show)
- David Torkanowsky
- Allen Toussaint

=== Other interviews ===
Non-musicians interviewed will usually be a scientist or author who has insight into a news issue, often the Hurricane Katrina disaster in New Orleans. These have included:

- John M. Barry on the levees in New Orleans and SLFPA
- Dr. Robert Bea on levee failures in New Orleans during Katrina
- Bill Black on the bank mortgage fraud and foreclosure crisis
- Dan Cameron on the Prospect 1 New Orleans biennial art project
- Lolis Eric Elie on reporting about New Orleans
- Ivor van Heerden on the Katrina disaster in New Orleans
- Stephanie Kelton, economist
- Jane Mayer on her book The Dark Side
- Mort Sahl on his career as an American satirist
- Scott Simon on reporting at the political conventions
- Yves Smith on the bank mortgage fraud and foreclosure crisis with transcript

== Music segments ==
"An eclectic mix of mysterious music" is how KCRW describes the music played between other segments on the program. The tracks are not announced on air, but the names are published a few days after the show airs on HarryShearer.com.

Aside from the musicians already mentioned, tracks played frequently include such acts as Johnny Adams, Astral Project, Marcia Ball, The Beach Boys, The Beatles, The Bobs, Bonerama, Charles Brown, Oscar Brown Jr., Henry Butler, Jon Cleary, Nat King Cole, Shawn Colvin, Ry Cooder, Elvis Costello, Dr. John, Dave Edmunds, Eliane Elias, Georgie Fame, Finn Brothers, Ella Fitzgerald, John Fogerty, Fountains of Wayne, Michael Franks, Marvin Gaye, Gilberto Gil, The Hi-Lo's, Dan Hicks, Dick Hyman, Jamiroquai, Louis Jordan, Keb' Mo', Sonny Landreth, Lenine, Los Lobos, Lyle Lovett, Phillip Manuel, Peter Martin, Paul McCartney, The Meters, Van Morrison, Mr. Scruff, Randy Newman, Rosa Passos, Nicholas Payton, Alan Price, Brian Protheroe, The Quantic Soul Orchestra, The Radiators, Bonnie Raitt, Marcus Roberts, Smokey Robinson, Shorty Rogers, The Rolling Stones, Kermit Ruffins, Alice Russell, Frank Sinatra, Jill Sobule, Steely Dan, They Might Be Giants, Irma Thomas, Richard Thompson, Mel Tormé, The Whitlams, The Who, Brian Wilson, Charlie Wood & the New Memphis Underground, XTC and many others.

When a notable musician has died, the next aired program will often feature mostly or only that artist's work during the music segments. People so featured have included George Harrison, Ray Charles, Oscar Brown Jr., Blossom Dearie, Les Paul, Robert Kirby, Gerry Rafferty, Jerry Ragovoy, B.B. King, and Prince.

== Segment theme music ==
- The show opens with an archival recording of Ben Grauer saying "Here it is". For years, this was followed by Shearer saying, "From deep inside your radio..." over a fragment of classical music (Wolfgang Amadeus Mozart's Eine kleine Nachtmusik, 4th movement), a parody of the American Public Radio/Public Radio International/Minnesota Public Radio intro featuring the Brandenburg Concerto No. 6, 3rd movement by Bach. The opener was modified starting with December 13, 2015 episode with Shearer saying "From deep inside your audio device of choice..." over a fragment of contemporary electronic music.
- A looped sample of "Uncle Albert/Admiral Halsey" by Paul McCartney is used for "Apologies of the Week", with emphasis on McCartney saying "sorry".
- Glenn Yarbrough singing the Rod McKuen song "Listen to the Warm" is used for "News of the Warm".
- Joe Satriani playing "Summer Song" (from the album The Extremist) is the theme for "(Inside) Extra Access Tonight"
- The Beatles instrumental "Flying" (from the album Magical Mystery Tour) is the theme for "Tales of Airport Security"
- The segments "F is for FEMA", "Los Angeles Dog Trainer Corrections", "Let's Get Scared", "News from the Digital Wonderland", "News of Inspectors General" and "Clean, Safe, Too Cheap to Meter" use original music recorded and sung by Shearer.
- "Clintonsomething" uses the original theme music from the TV series thirtysomething.
- "The Trades" uses "Rut" by Carla Bley, from the CD "Nightglo" on ECM
- "News of Transparency" uses a Shearer produced version of another Beatles song I'm Looking Through You
- "News of Clowns" at first used an instrumental version of Be a Clown, but switched to The Tears of a Clown by Smokey Robinson & The Miracles (from the album Make It Happen)

== Criticism ==
On July 2, 2006, Wisconsin Public Radio cancelled Le Show as part of a revamp of the network's programming. On the July 16 edition of the program, Shearer claimed WPR was "displeased with the political content of the broadcast". WPR Director of Radio Phil Corriveau told the Milwaukee Journal Sentinel that the program's political content was a minor factor and the decision had to do with Le Show's consistency: "I think he's brilliant. But I think if you listen to the show, they can be brilliant, or they can really ramble on."
