= Tom Leopold =

American novelist

- Born: 1949 (age 76–77); Miami Beach, Florida, U.S.
- Education: New York University
- Occupation: Comedy writer

Tom Leopold (born 1949) is an American comedy writer, performer and novelist. He has written episodes of Seinfeld and Cheers, along with several books. Leopold has often been associated with Chevy Chase, Harry Shearer and Paul Shaffer due to his work with them on various projects. He also provided vocal performances with Jonathan Katz in animated productions for the Internet such as Hey, We're Back and Explosion Bus.

== Early life ==
Leopold was born in Miami Beach, Florida, and grew up in nearby Coral Gables, the son of Paul and Joanne Leopold. He attended Coral Gables Senior High School before graduating from the School of Performing Arts at New York University.

== Career ==
Leopold began writing material for National Lampoon magazine and went on to work on The National Lampoon Radio Hour when it was created in 1973. He worked with performers such as Chevy Chase, Richard Belzer, and Christopher Guest.

He transitioned into television sketch comedy writing when The Chevy Chase Show began in 1977 (not to be confused with the ill-fated 1993 talk show of the same name). He wrote for other programs such as The Marilyn McCoo and Billy Davis Jr. Show, The Richard Belzer Show, and The Steve Allen Comedy Hour. In 1979, he wrote and performed in a sketch comedy program called The T.V. Show with Christopher Guest, Michael McKean, Martin Mull, Rob Reiner, and Harry Shearer.

He later began writing for television situation comedies and has done this successfully ever since. He has been a producer, story editor, and writer on a number of top American programs, including Caroline in the City, Cheers, Ellen, Hope & Faith, Seinfeld, and Will & Grace. Other programs for which he has written include The Mind of the Married Man and Dream On. He wrote two episodes of Seinfeld ("The Cafe" and "The Suicide") and he co-wrote the episode "The Cheever Letters". He wrote two episodes of Cheers ("The Beer Is Always Greener" and "Norm's Big Audit"). In 2006, he became executive producer of the British sitcom My Family.

Based on his experience writing for television comedy, Leopold has led a master class in sitcom writing called "Comedy Writer's Room" at Columbia University.

Leopold and Harry Shearer are friends and have collaborated on several projects. They were hired together to do a rewrite of the 1986 film Club Paradise. In the end, only two words of what they wrote ended up in the film (the title), and Shearer was "so appalled by the movie" that he removed his name from the credits. Leopold left his name on the movie, but has done no film writing since.

In 1994, Leopold and Shearer also wrote a musical comedy about J. Edgar Hoover called J. Edgar! . The musical was produced for radio in Los Angeles by L.A. Theatre Works, with music by Peter Matz. It starred Kelsey Grammer and John Goodman and featured Dan Castellaneta, Christopher Guest, Michael McKean, and Annette O'Toole. It has also been performed at the U.S. Comedy Arts Festival in 2003. A cast recording was produced and is still available.

Leopold often calls in to Shearer's radio program Le Show, playing such unusual characters as "Yvonne Della Femina" (O. J. Simpson's alleged girlfriend who has changed sex several times) or even Elvis Presley. (See the Le Show article for a more complete list of his characters).

Leopold and Shearer are also friends with Paul Shaffer. They share an interest in the vagaries of show business itself and sometimes go on trips to see odd shows. In a New York article, Leopold said: "Paul, Harry and I are show-biz-philes. We fly all over to see these bad, funny shows". Leopold and Shearer produced and co-wrote (with Shaffer) a 1986 Cinemax special titled Viva Shaf Vegas in which Leopold also performed, some of which was based on this shared interest.

Leopold has written two novels; his first was Almost Like Being Here in 1988, which was followed by the sequel Somebody Sing in 1990. The books got mixed reviews. The first book was produced as a stage play in Chicago in 1993.

In 2008, he collaborated with Bob Sand to publish a biography of a mythical comedy writing team "Milt Wagonman and Marty Sloyxne", who are profane and largely unsuccessful. A number of promotional videos for the book have been posted, and in them Leopold and Sand appear as the characters. (Leopold plays Milt Wagonman).

Leopold occasionally performs as a comedic actor in film or television and at live events (most recently in September 2008).

In 2012, Leopold began hosting a weekly radio show, Entertaining Truth, on The Catholic Channel exclusive to Sirius XM Satellite Radio. The show featured Leopold, alongside priest and chef Father Leo Patalinghug, discussing the Catholic Church in an entertaining light.

== Personal life ==
Leopold lives in New York City with his wife and two daughters. He owns a summer home in Greenport, New York that he bought from Kofi Annan. Leopold was raised in a secular, culturally Jewish family. As an adult, he converted to Catholicism.

== Bibliography ==
- Leopold, Tom (1988), Almost Like Being Here, New York: Dutton, p. 144, ISBN 0-525-24632-0
- Leopold, Tom (1990), Somebody Sing, New York: Dutton, p. 165, ISBN 0-525-24869-2
- Leopold, Tom; Sand, Bob (2008), Milt & Marty: The Longest Lasting and Least Successful Comedy Writing Duo in Showbiz History, New York: Virgin Books, pp. 208, ISBN 978-1-905264-18-6
