= U.S. Army Corps of Engineers civil works controversies =

The United States Army Corps of Engineers (USACE) is involved in a wide range of public works projects, including environmental protection, water supply, recreation, flood damage and reduction, beach nourishment, homeland security, military construction, and support for other government agencies. It currently manages 740 dams across the United States and Puerto Rico. Across 12 Flood Control Acts, beginning with the first on March 1, 1917, Congress has authorized the Corps of Engineers to participate in flood protection and damage reduction in almost every state.

USACE projects are either specifically authorized by Congress or fall under a Congressionally authorized category. With projects carried out in all fifty states, local citizens, special interest groups, and political organizations may lobby Congress for authorization and funding of specific projects in their areas. These groups may also oppose some or all aspects of a USACE project.

Many civil works projects undertaken by USACE have been criticized as being riddled with patronage or a waste of resources. Examples include the New Madrid Floodway Project and the flood protection systems in New Orleans. Some projects have been described as relying on flawed or manipulated analyses during the planning phase. Certain projects have also been criticized for causing significant environmental damage or for providing limited economic benefits, such as the Mississippi River–Gulf Outlet in southeast Louisiana. Faulty design and substandard construction have been cited as contributing factors in the failure of levees following Hurricane Katrina. Former U.S. Senators Russ Feingold and John McCain have advocated for reforming the Corps' approach. Holding the Corps accountable has also been supported by the group Levees.Org, led by Sandy Rosenthal.

However, some observers argue that a key difficulty in implementing changes has been the political process itself. Whether USACE planners and engineers can achieve optimal outcomes within the constraints of the direction they receive remains part of ongoing debate.

== Levee failures in New Orleans during Hurricane Katrina ==
=== Description of failures ===
On August 29, 2005, Hurricane Katrina passed to the east of New Orleans, and the Corps' flood protection failed, with levee breaches in over fifty different areas. The levee failures caused massive flooding in New Orleans, resulting in property loss and drownings. When Katrina arrived, the hurricane protection efforts authorized were between 60% and 90% complete, with the projected date of completion estimated to be 2015.

=== Authorization in the Flood Control Act of 1965 ===
The Flood Control Act of 1965 (FCA 1965) was enacted after Hurricane Betsy flooded large sections of New Orleans and mandated the US Army Corps of Engineers as the federal agency responsible for levee design and construction. Among other projects and studies, the FCA 1965 authorized the Lake Pontchartrain and Vicinity, Louisiana, Hurricane Protection Project. The project was to construct a series of control structures, concrete flood walls, dikes, and levees to provide hurricane protection to areas around Lake Pontchartrain. Although federally authorized, it was a joint federal, state, and local effort. The state and local effort was handled by the Orleans Levee Board, which provided operational control and maintenance of the levees after the corps turned over completed structures to it.

=== Investigations of the levee failures ===
In October 2005, Lt. Gen. Carl Strock, Chief of Engineers and the Commander of the Corps of Engineers, established the Inter-agency Performance Evaluation Task Force (IPET) to "provide credible and objective scientific and engineering answers to fundamental questions about the performance of the hurricane protection and flood damage reduction system in the New Orleans metropolitan area". IPET membership consisted of multiple employees of the U.S. Army Corps of Engineers, past and present, as well as individuals from academia, other states, water experts, and a few other federal agencies.

The same month, a Washington Post article reported that "local officials often resisted proposals to protect their communities from storms because they did not want to pay their share of federal projects". However, this claim was refuted in an August 2015 report published in Water Policy, the official journal of the World Water Council. The authors concluded, "We have not uncovered any information that would suggest that the members of the OLB who served on the Engineering Committee or the OLD staff engineers behaved irresponsibly or in a manner that did not place the interests of the city residents at the forefront..."

In June 2006, General Strock accepted responsibility on behalf of the Corps for the failure of the flood protection, calling it "a system in name only." Faulty design specifications and incomplete or substandard construction of levee segments were contributing factors in the failure of flood protection.

In April 2007, the American Society of Civil Engineers (ASCE) began referring to the flooding as the worst engineering catastrophe in US history. On 1 June 2007, the American Society of Civil Engineers issued its External Peer Review (ERP) report, the peer review of the Corps-sponsored IPET and also an accompanying press release. However, the press release was criticized because it contained information that was not present in the report, included information that conflicted with the report, and minimized the Army Corps' involvement in the catastrophe. The press release stated, "Even without breaching, Hurricane Katrina’s rainfall and surge over topping would have caused extensive and severe flooding—and the worst loss of life and property loss ever experienced in New Orleans". Meanwhile, the ERP report stated that had levees and pump stations not failed, "far less property loss would have occurred, and nearly two-thirds of deaths could have been avoided".

On July 9, 2007, retired Lt. G. Elvin "Vald" Heiberg III stated in a letter to the New Orleans Times Picayune that he should be blamed for the Katrina disaster. He said that as Commander of the New Orleans District and later as the Commander of the Corps of Engineers in the mid-1980s, he gave in to local interests—notably, Save Our Wetlands— too easily after various legal challenges. However, law professors Thomas McGarity and Douglas Kysar, in their article highlighting the 'hazards of hindsight analysis,’ put the process under the microscope and concluded that the corps had decided to build what locals preferred. The corps had not been forced to do anything against its will.

The IPET draft findings indicate that;

Except four foundation design failures, all of the major breaches were caused by overtopping and subsequent erosion. Reduced protective elevations increased the amount of overtopping, erosion, and subsequent flooding, particularly in eastern New Orleans. The structures that ultimately breached performed as designed, protecting until overtopping occurred and then becoming vulnerable to catastrophic breaching. The levee-floodwall designs for the 17th Street and London Avenue Outfall Canals and IHNC were inadequate. In these cases, the structures failed catastrophically prior to water reaching design elevations. A significant number of structures that were subjected to water levels beyond their design limits performed well. Typically, in the case of floodwalls, they represented more conservative design assumptions and, for levees, use of higher quality, less erodible materials.

In October 2007, Dr. Ray Seed, University of California-Berkeley civil engineering professor and ASCE member, submitted an ethics complaint to the ASCE alleging that, with the help of the ASCE, the Corps sought to minimize its mistakes in the flooding and intimidate anyone who tried to intervene and delay the final results until public attention had turned elsewhere. The corps acknowledged receiving a copy of the letter but has refused to comment until after the ASCE's Committee on Professional Conduct (CPC), led by Rich Hovey, comments on the complaint. It took over a year for the ASCE to announce the results of the CPC. When the results of the internal ethics investigation were announced, the ASCE panel did not file any charges of ethical misconduct against any of its staffers. They blamed their errors in their June press release on "staff level and not by review panel members."

An external task force led by retired congressman Sherwood Boehlert (R–NY) also conducted an investigation.

Boehlert's task force was assembled at the request of ASCE in response to Dr. Seed's ethics complaint and a video produced by Levees.Org spoofing the apparent conflict of interest. The task force consisted of members from the National Science Foundation, the National Academy of Sciences, the National Institute of Standards and Technology, and the American Water Works Association.

The task force's report criticized how ASCE conducts its peer reviews and recommended improvements. Most notable throughout the document was the inadequate "consideration of real or perceived conflict of interest". The task force acknowledged that the "potential conflicts of interest in ASCE's engineering review process are not unique to ASCE and can be addressed through procedures utilized by many government agencies charged with providing unbiased assessments to the public". Mr. Boehlert's task force also praised ASCE by writing, saying that "ASCE has long been respected for its investigatory skill and expertise, and its work on assessments is held in high regard by those in the engineering profession. The Task Force believes ASCE remains the best option for conducting post-disaster engineering assessments."

The grassroots group, Levees.Org, claimed that the IPET investigation and an expert review panel (ERP) convened by ASCE lacked credibility because of the involvement and management of the Corps of Engineers. The group contended that the ERP validating the IPET process was an apparent conflict of interest because the Corps selected the ASCE, directly paid the ASCE over $2 million, and awarded the panel members Outstanding Civilian Service Medals (OCSM) before their work was complete. Levees.Org was not successful in convincing members of Congress to create an independent levee investigation commission.

=== Lawsuits against the Corps in New Orleans ===
In March 2007, the City of New Orleans filed a $77 billion claim against the USACE for damages sustained from faulty levee construction and resultant flooding during Hurricane Katrina. Hundreds of thousands of individual claims were also received in the New Orleans branch office of the USACE. In addition to the City of New Orleans, other claimants include Entergy New Orleans, the city's now-bankrupt electric utility, and the New Orleans Sewerage and Water Board.

In February 2007, the U.S. District Court ruled that the Flood Control Act of 1928 did not apply to cases involving navigational projects but that the Corps may be sued over alleged defects in its Mississippi River-Gulf Outlet navigation channel.

In January 2008, the District Court ruled that even though the US Army Corps of Engineers was negligent and derelict in their duty to provide flood protection for the citizens of New Orleans, it was compelled to dismiss a class action lawsuit filed against the Corps for levee breaches after Hurricane Katrina due to FCA 1928, which protects the federal government from lawsuits over flood control projects. The case was not appealed.

In November 2009, the US District Court for Eastern Louisiana held the US Army Corps of Engineers responsible for the flooding from the two east IHNC levee breaches (and dozens of others) because the federal agency failed to properly maintain the Mississippi River Gulf Outlet (MRGO). As of June 2011, the federal government has appealed the ruling.

In April 2010, scholars with the Louisiana State Office of Historic Preservation approved the text for a Historic Plaque for the 17th Street Canal. After receiving permission from city agencies and the Corps of Engineers, the flood protection group Levees.Org installed the Plaque at ground zero, on New Orleans city property, in the Lakeview neighborhood.

The text of the plaque read as follows:

On August 29, 2005, a federal floodwall atop a levee on the 17th Street Canal, the largest and most important drainage canal for the city, gave way here, causing flooding that killed hundreds. This breach was one of 50 ruptures in the federal Flood Protection System that occurred that day. In 2008, the US District Court placed responsibility for this floodwall's collapse squarely on the US Army Corps of Engineers; however, the agency is protected from financial liability in the Flood Control Act of 1928.

=== Internet Online Commenting Controversy ===
In December 2008, the Sandy Rosenthal leader of the group Levees.Org called a New Orleans CBS affiliate television station and offered to give them an exclusive to publicize several instances in which employees of the corps used taxpayer-funded computers to post derogatory blog comments deriding citizen activists' efforts. In response to the news story, the U.S. Army Corps of Engineers described the event as an isolated incident. Three days after the incident was publicized, the Commander of the New Orleans District of the Corps of Engineers, Colonel Alvin Lee, issued a formal apology. "Please accept my apology for the unprofessional comments someone in my district posted to your website", said the letter. "I have reinforced with my entire staff that this was an inappropriate and unacceptable use of our computers and time". On 23 June 2009, US Senator Mary Landrieu ordered a Pentagon investigation into the issue.

On 29 September 2009, the Department of Defense Inspector General's Office closed its investigation. "We believe that (Corps' New Orleans District office) officials took appropriate actions once informed of the allegations at issue," Assistant Inspector General John Crane said in a letter to U.S. Sen. Mary Landrieu, D-La. "Accordingly, further review by this agency is not warranted." Those actions included strongly worded messages to corps employees telling them that comments that demeaned corps critics were not allowed. In addition, access to the site of the Levees.Org group was blocked from Corps computers, preventing employees from commenting there. Lastly, the employee of a contractor—who was a former Corps employee himself and was identified as using a government computer to post disparaging remarks on NOLA.com—was barred from working on Corps projects.

=== Public Relations Controversy ===
In 2007, the New Orleans District hired a PR firm, Outreach Process Partners (OPP), allegedly to develop educational materials and set up public meetings that the Corps is required by law to hold in order to get feedback from residents about the Corps' projects. For this work, OPP received nearly $5 million. The total cost of the PR contract is $5,250,000.

In May 2009, an internet blogger discovered that OPP had a bar graph on its website that boasted how it helped reduce negative news coverage that plagued the Corps following Hurricane Katrina. The group Levees.Org publicly stated that the Corps should not be spending taxpayer dollars trying to repair its reputation.

== Water supply issues ==
Army involvement in works "of a civil nature," including water resources, goes back almost to the origins of the U.S. Over the years, the nation's needs have changed. Likewise, so have the Army's Civil Works missions. Water resources controlled by the Corps of Engineers are used for navigation, hydroelectric power generation, recreation, and water supply. The Corps first got involved in water supply in the 1850s, when they built the Washington, D.C. aqueduct. Today, USACE reservoirs supply water to nearly 10 million people in 115 cities. In the drier parts of the nation, water from the Corps' reservoirs is also used for agriculture.

Georgia, Alabama, and Florida have been wrangling over how to allocate water from the Chattahoochee watershed for years as metro Atlanta's population has doubled since 1980. In October 2007, the governor of Georgia Sonny Perdue, indicating an impending crisis with the water supply from Lake Lanier due to an ongoing drought in the region, declared a state of emergency and confirmed that the state would sue the USACE, who administered the water supply for Atlanta. The Corps acknowledged that they made a mistake in 2006 when they relied on a faulty gauge to measure Lake Lanier's level by nearly two feet. This mistake led to an overestimation of the amount of water left in the lake, and the Corps accidentally released about 22 billion US gallons (83,000,000 m^{3}) of water: enough to supply metro Atlanta's needs for about a month and a half.

However, USACE's analysis of the situation differed from the governor's, indicating that even without rain for nine months, water supplies would still be adequate. The corps sent a letter to Perdue assessing the situation and pointing out that they are "not going to run out [of water] any time soon," In mid-November 2007, the Corps made adjustments to its water retention policies to keep more water in the Chattahoochee watershed. The U.S. Fish and Wildlife Service expedited its study of an interim drought plan submitted by the U.S. Army Corps of Engineers, and concluded that freshwater mussels and sturgeon in Florida and Alabama—kept alive by water from Georgia's Chattahoochee watershed under federal law—will not be jeopardized under the plan. The governors of the three states indicated that they would continue to meet and negotiate.

Other states and tribal nations have also been involved with or had concerns about how the Corps manages water supply, to the extent that Congress or the courts have often gotten involved in trying to mediate disputes.

== Wetlands jurisdiction ==
One of the major responsibilities of the Corps of Engineers is administering the wetlands permitting program under Section 404 of the Federal Water Pollution Control Act of 1972. (also known as "The Clean Water Act"). This act authorized the Secretary of the Army to issue permits for the discharge of dredged and fill material.

Section 10 of the Rivers and Harbors Act of 1899 (codified in Chapter 33, Section 403 of the United States Code) gave the Corps authority over navigable waters of the United States. As navigable waters are defined as "navigable waters of the United States are those waters that are subject to the ebb and flow of the tide and/or are presently being used, or have been used in the past, or may be susceptible for use to transport interstate or foreign commerce", the Corps has broad authority to enforce this, including licensing of bridges over navigable waters, and the maintenance of pier head and bulkhead lines.

There is some disagreement over the extent of the Corps' reach into the wetlands, whether USACE or the US Environmental Protection Agency (EPA) should have jurisdiction, and how the wetlands should be regulated. Often, it is difficult to describe the problem or make jurisdictional determinations. Many times, people are frustrated because the process isn't transparent or easy. In some cases, it appears that Corps (and EPA) regulators are searching for excuses to justify decisions in allegedly difficult circumstances.

The US Supreme Court has addressed environmental regulation by the Corps of Engineers three times in the last two decades. In 1985, the Supreme Court ruled 9–0 that the Clean Water Act extended to wetlands adjacent to open waters. They left open the question about wetlands not adjacent to Federal waters (United States v. Riverside Bayview Homes, Inc., 474 U.S. 121 (1985)) (see Bayview Homes in Regulatory takings). In 2001, the Court further decided 5–4 that the CWA does not cover areas that had filled with water (Solid Waste Agency of Northern Cook City. v. Army Corps of Engineers, 531 U.S. 159 (2001)). The Corps of Engineers had claimed authority over the site by saying that migratory birds used the pond as habitat, but were overruled by the Supreme Court because they were claiming powers not granted by Congress by attempting to extend its jurisdiction to ponds with no connection to navigable waters.

The Court's most recent ruling was in June 2006 in Rapanos v. United States. At issue was the way the Federal government regulates the nation's wetlands under the Clean Water Act. The law has been contentious with property owners because it requires a permit for filling and dredging wetlands that empty into navigable waters and their tributaries. Developers have long challenged the Corps' right to regulate wetlands that are not free-flowing into navigable waters. Narrowly avoiding the gutting of the Clean Water Act, the Supreme Court voted 5–4 to send the case back to the lower courts for a ruling.

Chief Justice John Roberts wrote, "It is unfortunate that no opinion commands a majority of the court on precisely how to read Congress's limits on the reach of the Clean Water Act. Lower courts and regulated entities will now have to feel their way on a case-by-case basis."

Wetlands jurisdiction by the Corps of Engineers will, for the foreseeable future, remain contentious.

== Beach nourishment ==
The beach nourishment work by the Corps of Engineers is another area of controversy since the temporary replenishment of beach sand is costly and profitable. The reasons for beach nourishment are often misunderstood. USACE beach nourishment projects are authorized under Section 111 of the 1968 Rivers and Harbors Act (P.L. 90–483 as amended by Sec 940, WRDA '86 (P.L. 99-662)) as mitigation for the damage caused by federal navigation projects interrupting the littoral flow of beach material along shorelines. These laws require that authorized projects be cost-shared, and the Federal share of costs for any one project may not exceed $2 million. Many people believe that it is only done for the benefit of well-heeled adjacent landowners rather than for erosive or littoral purposes.

One lobbying firm, Marlowe & Company, charges 40 clients $40,000 each just to lobby for continued support for this controversial effort to save beaches. Many homeowners are disgruntled with the huge annual costs associated with this temporary fix; typical fees are $2,000 per month for a 3 bedroom beachfront condominium (such fees are most probably locally authorized since the Corps of Engineers does not assess fees because of the nature of its Congressionally approved funding). However, many coastal residents are not willing to pay the price. For example, in 2001, the Corps authorized a proposal for a $94 million project 14 miles (23 km) long in Nags Head, N.C. In an attempt to fund the local share of the project, local county commissioners passed a 1 percent sales tax; voters rejected it. Nags Head officials proposed a cheaper, locally funded plan. Again, voters rejected it. "Why," asked WCU program director Rob Young, "should federal taxpayers bail out a beachfront when residents won't?"

== Barrier Islands in Louisiana and the Deepwater Horizon oil spill ==
Reacting to the Deepwater Horizon oil spill, on 23 May 2010, Louisiana Attorney General Buddy Caldwell wrote a letter to Lieutenant General Robert L. Van Antwerp of the US Army Corps of Engineers, stating that Louisiana has the right to dredge sand to build barrier islands to keep the oil spill from its wetlands without the approval of the Corps, as the 10th Amendment to the Constitution does not grant the federal government the authority to deny a state the right to act in an emergency. He also wrote that if the Corps "persists in its illegal and ill-advised efforts" to prevent the state from building the barriers that he would advise Louisiana Governor Bobby Jindal to proceed with the plans and challenge the Corps in court.

== New Jersey Beach Project 2017 ==
Despite court actions and an election where Margate, NJ, voters rejected a planned beach replenishment project, in the summer of 2017, Corps engineers began work creating dunes in Ventnor and Margate City, New Jersey. They made a very big mess, and additionally, beaches that are tested weekly in the summer for bacteria and toxins experienced unprecedented closings due to dangerous levels.

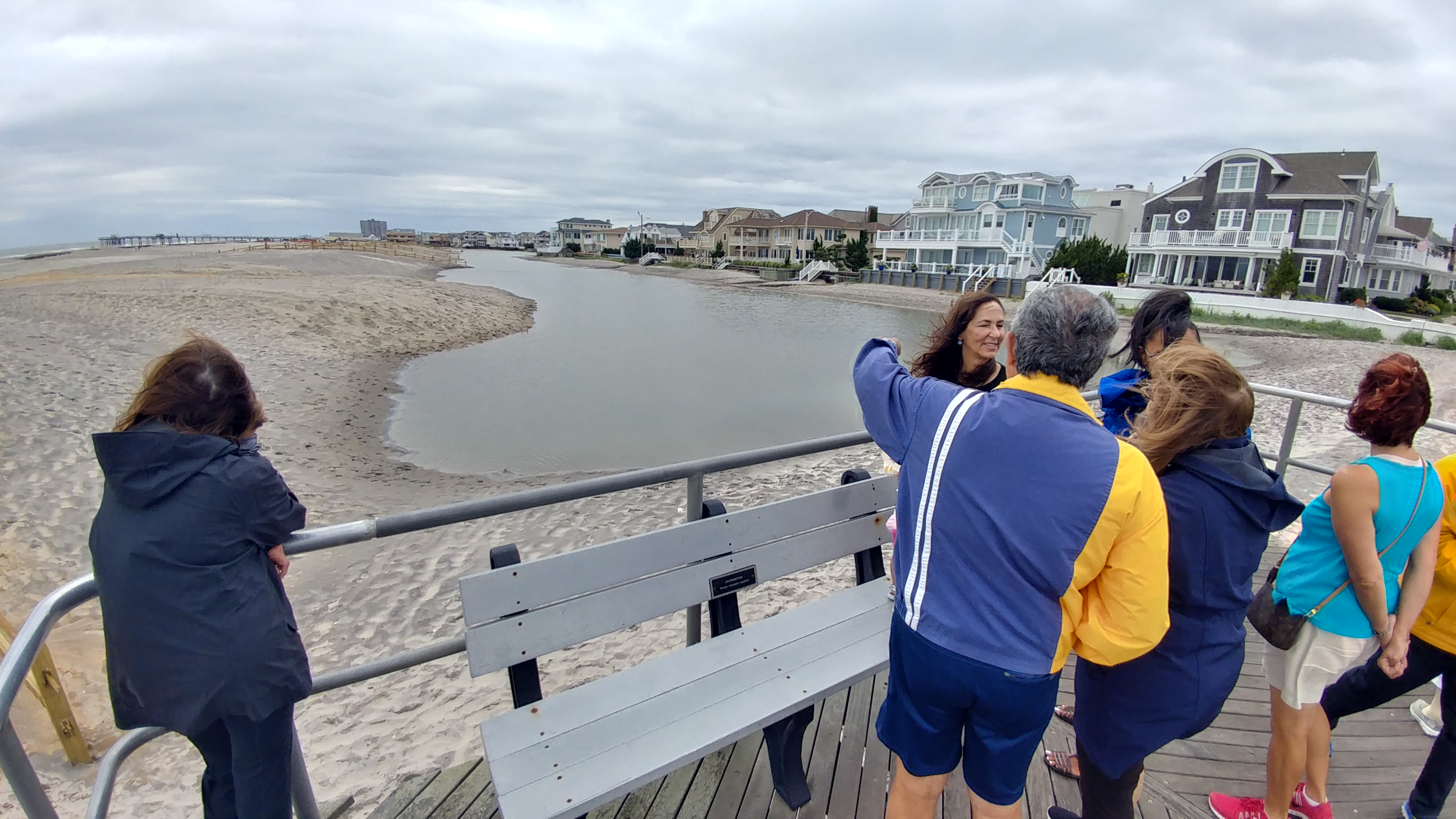
Trapped Contaminated Water behind Margate Dunes

On 2 August 2017, Margate Commissioners voted to go back to court to seek an injunction. They wanted an immediate work stoppage by the NJ DEP and Army Corps of Engineers. Mistakes in building the dunes caused substantial flooding and contaminated standing water between the new dune and the bulkheads.

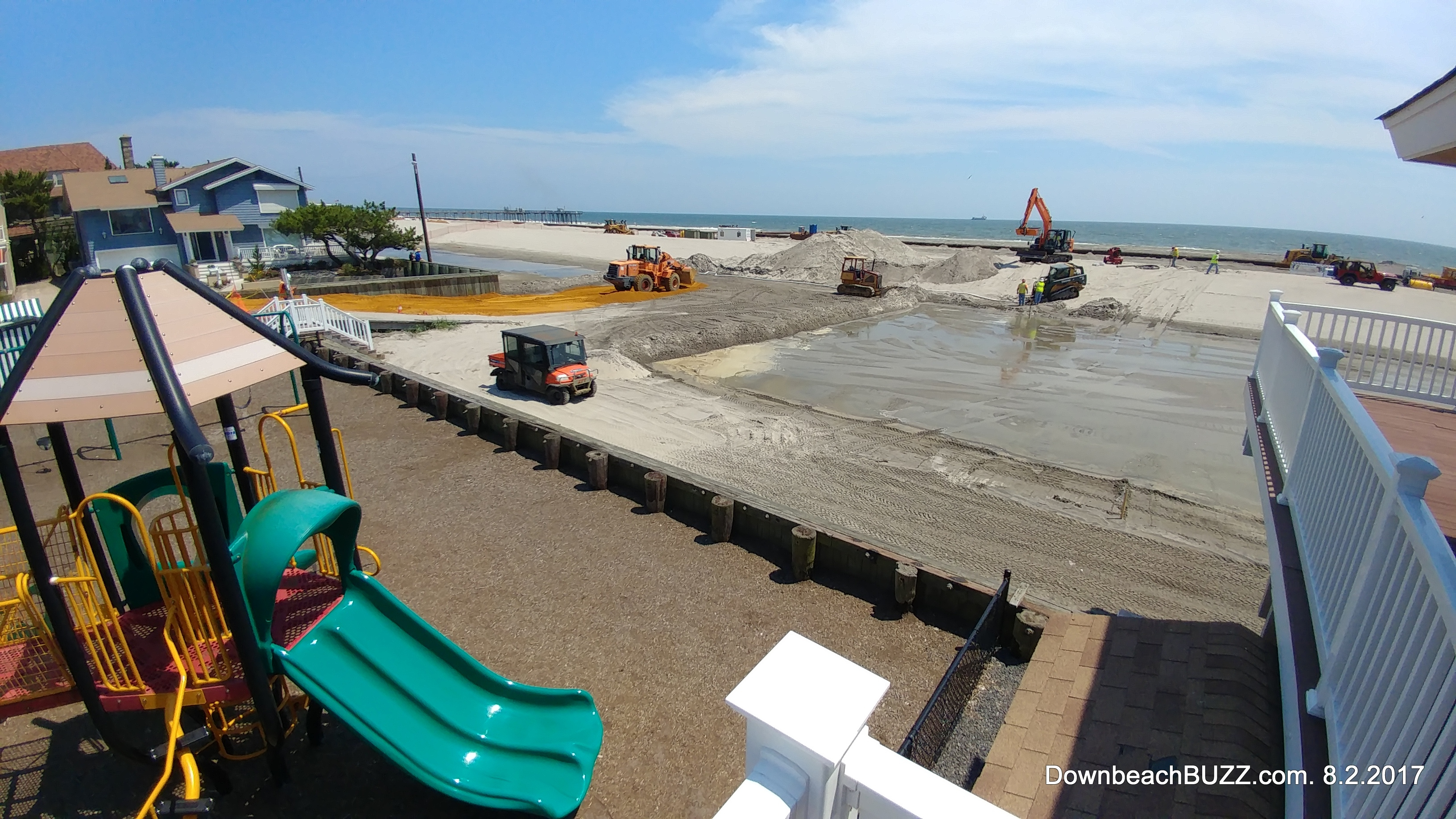
Building dunes in Margate, NJ.

== Calls for Corps reform ==
Some in Congress feel that reforms are necessary in the way the Corps operates. The Corps has been criticized as being mismanaged and lacking oversight and accountability, especially since Hurricane Katrina and the failure of the Army Corps built levees in New Orleans.

Senator Russ Feingold and Senator John McCain pushed to establish two amendments: an independent review of Corps projects from planning and design to construction, and a requirement that Corps projects be ranked by importance based on national priorities. In 2006, they succeeded in adding the peer review of corps projects to the Water resources development bill that was working its way through Congress.

In August 2007, Senator Feingold himself tried to block passage of the bill because he felt the reforms it contained would not do enough to change the way the Corps does business.

After a decade of government and independent reports calling for reforming the corps and pointing out stunning flaws in corps projects and project studies, and after the tragic failures of New Orleans levees during Hurricane Katrina, the American people deserve meaningful reform. How many more flawed projects or wasted dollars will it take before we say enough is enough?

— Senator Feingold from the Senate Floor

Calls for reform go back decades; the Corps' credibility had been challenged as early as the late 1920s. Herbert Hoover, then Secretary of Commerce, declared the Great Mississippi Flood of 1927, which covered 26,000 square miles (67,000 km^{2}) in seven states, as the "greatest disaster of peacetime in our history." More than 700,000 people were driven from their homes. More recent attempts at reform have been made in the 106th, 107th, 108th, and 109th Congresses. But as Senator Feingold indicated by quoting the Times-Picayune:

"Unfortunately, not everyone in Congress is interested in changing the way the corps does business. The McCain-Feingold amendments face opposition and a rival set of measures by the main authors of the water resources bill, Sens. James Inhofe and Kit Bond.... Sham reform won't do anything to restore confidence in the corps, and Congress must do better."

On 8 November 2007, the Water Resources Development Act of 2007 became law over President Bush's veto of the bill.

In 2012, President Obama issued Executive Order 13604, Improving Performance of Federal Permitting and Review of Infrastructure Projects, to streamline and reduce the time required for review and permitting of infrastructure projects. The feasibility study and environmental assessment for the deepening of Charleston Harbor was the first project to be completed under this new process.
