= Hurricane preparedness in New Orleans =

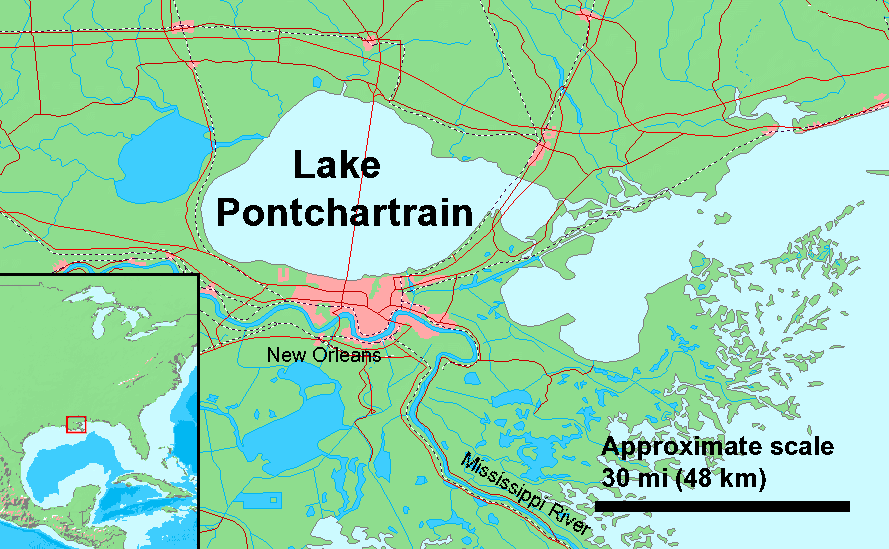
New Orleans; Louisiana sits between (and below) the Mississippi River and Lake Pontchartrain.

Hurricane preparedness in New Orleans has been an issue since the city's early settlement because of its location.

New Orleans was built on a marsh. Unlike the first two centuries of its existence, today a little under half of the modern city sits below sea level. The city is surrounded by the Mississippi River, Lake Pontchartrain to the north, and Lake Borgne on the east.

The earliest-settled parts of New Orleans and surrounding communities are above sea level. However, flooding was long a threat, from the periodic high waters of the Mississippi and from more occasional severe tropical storms which pushed the waters of Lake Pontchartrain into settled areas. Construction of the levees along the River began soon after the city was founded, and more extensive river levees were built as the city grew. These earthen barriers were erected to prevent damage caused by seasonal Mississippi River flooding. The Lake Pontchartrain shore was mostly undeveloped swamp, and only small levees were built there in the 19th century.

== Colonial era ==
Awareness of the city's vulnerability to hurricanes dates back to the early Colonial era. A major hurricane hit the city in September 1722, leveling many of the buildings in the young city.

1794 was perhaps as dreadful a year as the city of New Orleans ever experienced, as it suffered two hurricanes in addition to a major fire.

== 19th century hurricanes ==
The 19th century saw powerful and devastating hurricanes such as the 1856 Last Island Hurricane and the 1893 Chenière Caminada hurricane.

The Last Island Hurricane, the first of two major hurricanes in the 1856 Atlantic hurricane season. The storm first made landfall at Last Island, (Note: Official name: Isle Dernière. Became known as Isle Dernières (Little Islands) after the hurricane caused the island to split) located southwest of New Orleans on the Gulf of Mexico, destroyed nearly every building on the island, and killed more than 200 people of the 400 people on the island. The island was "left void of vegetation" and fragmented into smaller islands that have remained uninhabited ever since. New Orleans received 13 inches (330 mm) of rain during the storm.

The Chenière Caminada Hurricane of October 1893, also had a lasting impact. This natural disaster destroyed the island of Chenière Caminada. About half the inhabitants were killed because of this disaster.

== Early 20th century hurricanes ==
1909 saw the Grand Isle hurricane hit the city. There was major flooding in the "back of town" area and in the undeveloped swamps north of town.

The 1915 New Orleans hurricane, or as it was called locally, "the Great Storm of 1915" struck with more wind damage than the 1909 storm. Flooding was more limited in scope and duration due to improved drainage pumping. However, Lake Pontchartrain rose to a higher level than previously recorded, overtopping some of the back levees. The Sewage and Water Board recommended taller levees to protect the city from flooding on the lake side.

A much larger project to build up levees along the lake and extend the shoreline out by dredging began in 1927. As the city grew, there was increased pressure to develop lower-lying areas. A large system of canals and pumps was constructed to drain the land. Flooding containment efforts until the mid-20th century primarily focused on floods from the Mississippi River.

In 1947, the Fort Lauderdale hurricane struck the New Orleans area. There was moderate wind damage. Flood prevention was largely successful in Orleans Parish, but there was severe flooding in the new East Jefferson suburbs near the Lake.

== Late 20th century hurricanes ==
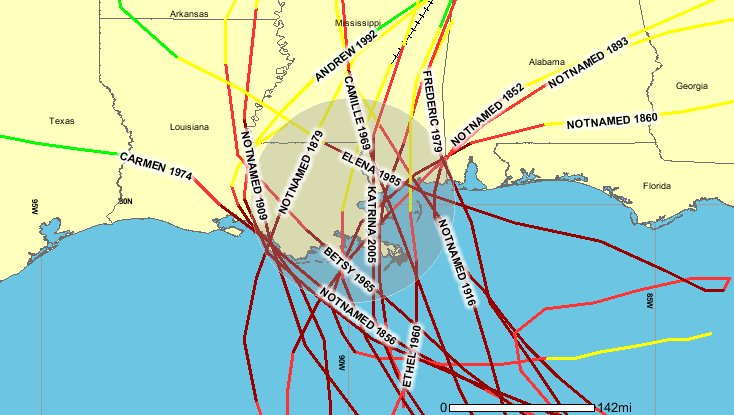
Hurricanes of Category 3 or greater passing within 100 miles of New Orleans (1852–2005), from NOAA

Hurricane Flossy in 1956 resulted in flooding in parts of Eastern New Orleans.

Hurricane Betsy in 1965 alerted a new generation to the threat posed by major hurricanes. As radar showed the storm heading for the city, a mandatory evacuation of Eastern New Orleans was declared. The Mississippi River-Gulf Outlet Canal channeled storm surge into the metro area. A levee failure was responsible for major flooding in the Lower 9th Ward.

The heavy flood damage caused by Hurricane Betsy brought concerns about hurricane flooding to the forefront. Betsy resulted in a major redesign of the levee system. By authorizing the United States Army Corps of Engineers to design and construct the flood protection, Congress essentially overrode responsibility for flood protection by the local levee boards. The Flood Control Act of 1965 directed the Corps of Engineers to plan for the maximum anticipated hurricane for the area. (This project was still under construction when the city was struck by Katrina 40 years later.)

The Corps of Engineers also designed a Lake Pontchartrain Hurricane Barrier to shield the city with flood gates like those which protect the Netherlands from the North Sea. Congress provided funding, and construction began in 1971. But the work stopped in 1977 when a federal judge ruled, in a lawsuit brought by the environmental group Save Our Wetlands, that the Corps' environmental impact statement was deficient. In 1985, after nearly a decade of court battles, the Corps scrapped the plan, and decided to reinforce the existing levee system instead.

The threat of 1969's Hurricane Camille was known in advance through improved radar technology and much of New Orleans braced for a repeat of Betsy. But Camille turned east and wreaked havoc on the Gulf coast of Mississippi and Alabama.

Hurricane Juan (1985) prompted a large evacuation from the city but did little damage.

Hurricane Andrew threatened the city in 1992. Clearly a major killer storm which had already devastated parts of south Florida, it prompted the largest evacuation of the city to date. Andrew turned west of the city but prompted re-evaluation of emergency evacuation procedures.

Hurricane Georges in 1998 precipitated an even larger evacuation. The Louisiana Superdome was opened as a shelter of last resort for those unable to evacuate, with unfortunate consequences as much of the venue was looted. Highways out of the city were tied up bumper to bumper, prompting development of the Contraflow lane reversal plan. The evacuation from Greater New Orleans and the Mississippi coast was the largest in U.S. history up to that point.

Georges missed the city, but it caused significant storm surge, raising the level of Lake Pontchartrain to the point that the city was spared major flooding only by the lake levees and flood walls. There was significant destruction to the areas just outside the flood walls, including at Little Woods [?] and at West End near the mouth of the 17th Street Canal.

== 21st century ==
In early 2001, the Federal Emergency Management Agency (FEMA), named three major scenarios as being among the most serious threats to the nation: (1) a major hurricane hitting New Orleans, (2) a terrorist attack in New York City, and (3) a large earthquake hitting San Francisco. In 2004, a Corps of Engineers study was done on the cost and feasibility of protecting southeast Louisiana from a major Category 5 hurricane, including construction of floodgate structures and raising existing levees. The report also suggested that the chances of a major Category 5 hurricane directly striking New Orleans was a one-in-500-year event.

=== Warnings of dangerous vulnerability ===
In 2001, the Houston Chronicle published a story which predicted that a severe hurricane striking New Orleans, "would strand 250,000 people or more, and probably kill one of 10 left behind as the city drowned under 20 feet (6.1 m) of water. Thousands of refugees could end up in Houston." In 2002, The Times Picayune published a feature covering various scenarios, including a Category 5 hurricane hitting the city from the south. The series also explored the various environmental changes that have increased the area's vulnerability. One article in the series concluded that hundreds of thousands would be left homeless, and it would take months to dry out the area and begin to make it liveable. But there would not be much for residents to come home to. The local economy would be in ruins.

Many concerns focus around the fact that the city lies below sea level with a levee system that was designed for hurricanes of no greater intensity than Category 3. Furthermore, its natural defenses, the surrounding marshland and the barrier islands, have been dwindling in recent years. Just a few months before Katrina, the FX docudrama Oil Storm depicted a Category 4 hurricane hitting New Orleans, killing thousands of people and forcing residents to evacuate and hide out in the Superdome, and speculated about a national economic meltdown caused by the decreased oil supply.

=== Hurricane Isidore ===
Hurricane Isidore in 2002 prompted some cautious New Orleanians to evacuate; the majority kept an eye on the news without leaving town. A state of emergency was declared a few days before landfall, and a curfew was also issued between 6 am and 10 pm. The Superdome was used as a "special needs" shelter for medical patients. There was relatively minor damage in the city; however, there was still some moderate flooding, with portions of Interstate 10 being closed due to rising water and the French Quarter being almost a foot underwater. The storm also shut down the Audubon Zoo.

=== LSU-USACE Study ===
In 2002 the Corps of Engineers, in conjunction with the Louisiana Water Resources Research Institute at Louisiana State University (LSU), and the authorities in Jefferson Parish, modeled the effects and aftermath of a Category 5 strike on New Orleans. The model predicted an unprecedented disaster, with extensive loss of life and property. The study identified the problem: the New Orleans area is like a bowl, surrounded by levees which are strongest along the outer Mississippi and primarily intended to contain river flooding. When a hurricane drives water into Lake Pontchartrain, the weaker levees bordering Pontchartrain and canals leading to it are overwhelmed. Water then flows into the below-sea-level city, accompanied by water overflowing the levees along the Mississippi on the south side of the city center.

=== Hurricane Ivan ===
In 2004, Hurricane Ivan's threat to the city resulted in the largest evacuation of the city to date. Mayor Ray Nagin issued a call for a voluntary evacuation of the city at 6 pm on September 13. An estimated 600,000 or more evacuated from Greater New Orleans. The contraflow plan was put into full effect for the first time, but rather late in the evacuation due to various confusions. This proved valuable practice, for the contraflow was implemented much more smoothly in 2005.

=== Hurricane Pam exercise ===
Hurricane Pam was a hypothetical hurricane used as a disaster scenario to drive planning for a 13-parish area in Southeastern Louisiana, including the city of New Orleans, in 2004. Developed by the Federal Emergency Management Agency, the Louisiana Office of Homeland Security, Emergency Preparedness, the National Weather Service, and Innovative Emergency Management, Inc., the mock hurricane scenario and its projected consequences were the focal point of an eight-day exercise held at the State Emergency Operations Center in Baton Rouge in July 2004. Hurricane Pam was imagined as a slow-moving Category 3 storm with sustained winds of 120 mph. It would bring up to 20 inches (510 mm) of rain to some parts of southeastern Louisiana and produce a levee-topping storm surge. The consequence assessment for Hurricane Pam indicated that more than one million people would be displaced and that 600,000 buildings would be damaged, with some completely destroyed. 60,000 people would be killed. The report on the simulation, TIME reported, warned that transportation would be a major problem in any storm situation paralleling the fictional "Hurricane Pam."

Follow-on Hurricane Pam workshops were conducted in November/December 2004, July 2005, and August 2005.

The Hurricane Pam scenario and the level of attention that the federal government paid to it were discussed following the catastrophic effects of Hurricane Katrina on New Orleans in November and December 2005.

On January 25, 2005, the Louisiana Sea Grant forum discussed additional results of several simulations of strong hurricanes hitting New Orleans.

=== Hurricane Cindy ===
Hurricane Cindy hit Louisiana at just barely hurricane strength on July 5, 2005. Many New Orleanians paid it little attention in advance, some having gotten blasé about threats of hurricanes which for decades had missed the city. However, Cindy's winds gusted to 70 mph (110 km/h) in the city, knocking branches off trees and causing New Orleans' largest blackout since Hurricane Betsy in 1965. The experience encouraged many to evacuate when the much more powerful Hurricane Katrina was heading towards the city less than two months later.

=== Hurricane Katrina ===
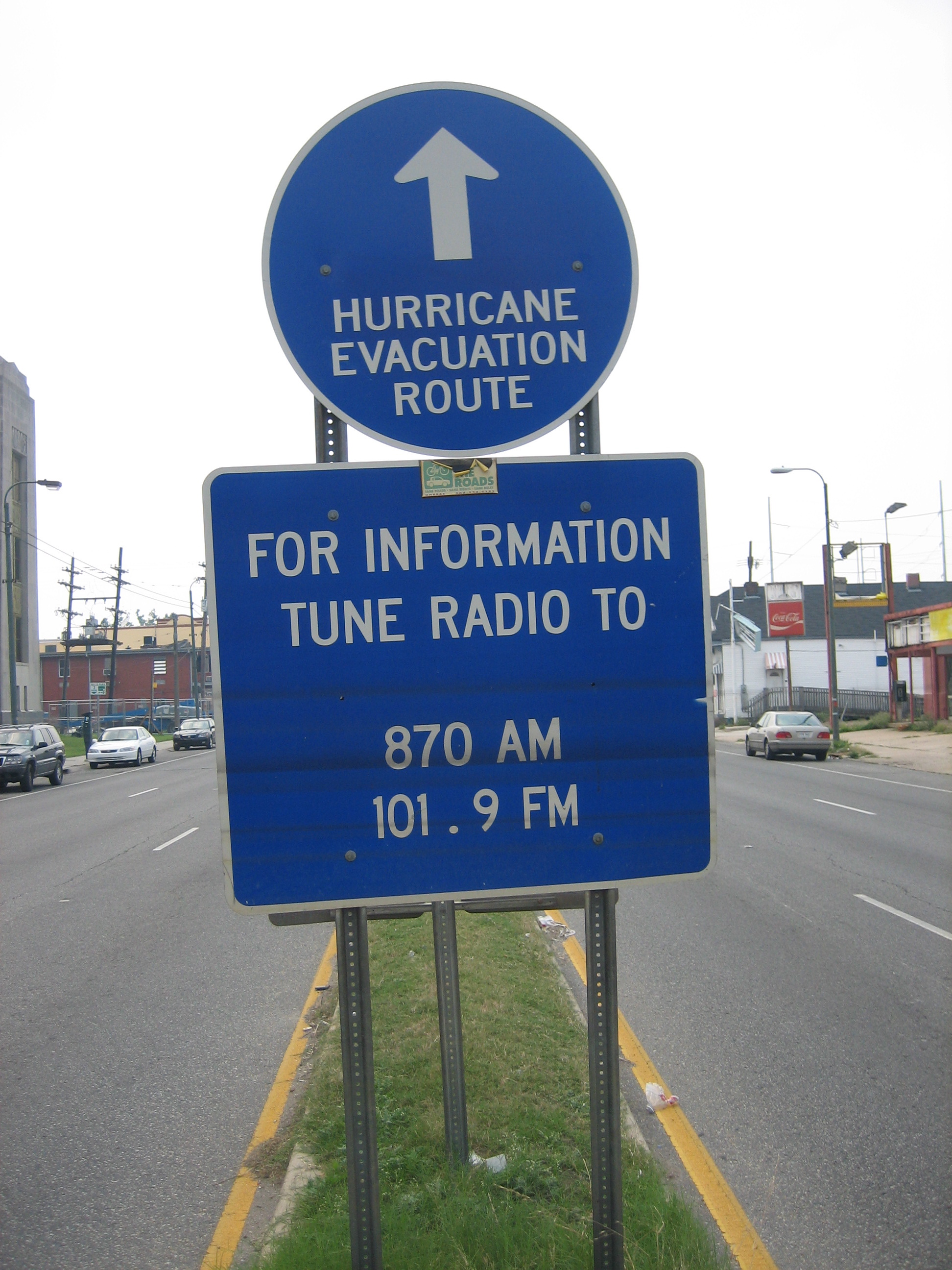
Evacuation route sign on Tulane Avenue in New Orleans shows lines from long-standing flood waters, after Hurricane Katrina.

Hurricane Katrina threatened the city in August 2005. The eye of the huge storm grazed the eastern side of the city, sparing it from the worst of its power. However, due to poorly designed levees and the worst civil engineering failure in United States history, most of the city experienced flooding similar to a direct hit; see: Levee failures in Greater New Orleans, 2005.

There were many predictions of hurricane risk in New Orleans before Katrina.

On August 26 the storm, at one point up to a Category 5, was in the Gulf with a projection to possibly hit New Orleans a few days later. (The previous day the projected path was towards the Florida Panhandle.) On August 27 Mayor Nagin declared a state of emergency and called for a voluntary evacuation. The following day he issued the city's first ever whole-city mandatory evacuation order. A mandatory evacuation order is an extreme measure: the most recent such order in Louisiana occurred when east New Orleans was ordered evacuated in 1965.

There have been various plans to mitigate or prevent catastrophes. The evacuation plans were the most successful. The contraflow worked relatively smoothly, and over 80% of the population succeeded in fleeing the area in advance of the storm. The evacuation no doubt saved thousands of lives. However, beyond the evacuation of those willing and able to leave town through their own resources, almost every other aspect of preparedness was found wanting.

Like many other cities, New Orleans heavily relied on evacuation in case of a Category 5 storm. The inadequacy of evacuation plans was shown when no provision was made in time to evacuate the large number of people– elderly, disabled, those without cars– who could not leave by their own means.

Blame for lack of preparedness has been leveled at all levels of government. New Orleans Mayor Ray Nagin had been criticized for not following the city's evacuation plan which called for the use of school buses to transport disadvantaged and elderly citizens out of the city. Louisiana Governor Kathleen Blanco was also criticized for not deploying the Louisiana National Guard sooner, although she did in fact deploy them before the hurricane hit and requested reinforcements from other states. Blanco asked for additional resources from the federal government, but refused to declare martial law or a state of emergency. Disorganization began when the Louisiana Governor declined a proposal from the White House to put National Guard troops under the control of the federal government. President George W. Bush and Homeland Security Secretary Michael Chertoff were also criticized for failures on the federal level as well as with his leadership role. FEMA chief Michael D. Brown admitted on the 1 year anniversary of landfall that there was no plan, and claimed that in the immediate aftermath of the disaster White House officials told him to lie to put a more positive spin on the Federal response.

==== Hurricane relief plan vs. non-existent flood relief plan ====
One of the most significant planning failures was that there was no plan for the effects of a levee breach with the mass flooding that would result. After a typical hurricane hit the region, the plan would be for disaster relief forces to reach the city by overland routes. Since there was no New Orleans mass flooding and isolation by flooding plan, the plan that was pulled off the books was the hurricane relief plan. When Hurricane Katrina struck in 2005, those weaknesses became catastrophic as flooding isolated much of the city and relief personnel. Most people in trucks couldn’t get through submerged areas. This plan failed because the relief personnel, most of whom were in trucks, could not get past nor through the areas that were under water. That there was no mass flooding relief plan to be executed was obvious by the lack of any heavy-lift helicopters such as Chinooks in relief forces that would have replaced the usual truck-born hurricane relief forces. A mass flooding with regional isolation plan would not have used land-based relief forces at all overland relief was impossible because of the barrier in place with the flooding.

==== Louisiana Superdome fiasco ====
The city's designation of the Louisiana Superdome as a "shelter of last resort" proved poor. It did not meet the safety standards required for a Red Cross shelter and thus it was not staffed by them or the Salvation Army. It was already known that the generators did not have enough capacity to provide lights and air conditioning for the entire dome in case of a power failure, and also pumps providing water to second-level restrooms wouldn't function. Thousands were trapped inside it as the area around it flooded and part of the roof blew off. Provisions for supplies were just barely adequate; sanitation, medical, and crowd control were worse. Since there was no flood-based federal nor state plan, heavy lift capacity helicopters that could have brought 16 tons of water, medical and food per flight were nowhere to be found. The much less effective hurricane-only response utilized much smaller UH and Black Hawk helicopters.

Under the National Response Plan, disaster planning is first and foremost a local government responsibility. On the day after the Hurricane, Michael Chertoff invoked the National Response Plan, transferring emergency authority to the Department of Homeland Security.

Civil order broke down, infrastructure failed, and some 80% of the city flooded. A few government responders, including Coast Guard helicopters and Louisiana Fisheries & Wildlife Boats, responded early and worked hard to save people stranded in the flooding, but their numbers were inadequate for the scope of the disaster. Private volunteers with boats assisted with rescue in great numbers, but significant Federal response was largely absent until 5 days after the disaster.

=== Post-Katrina ===
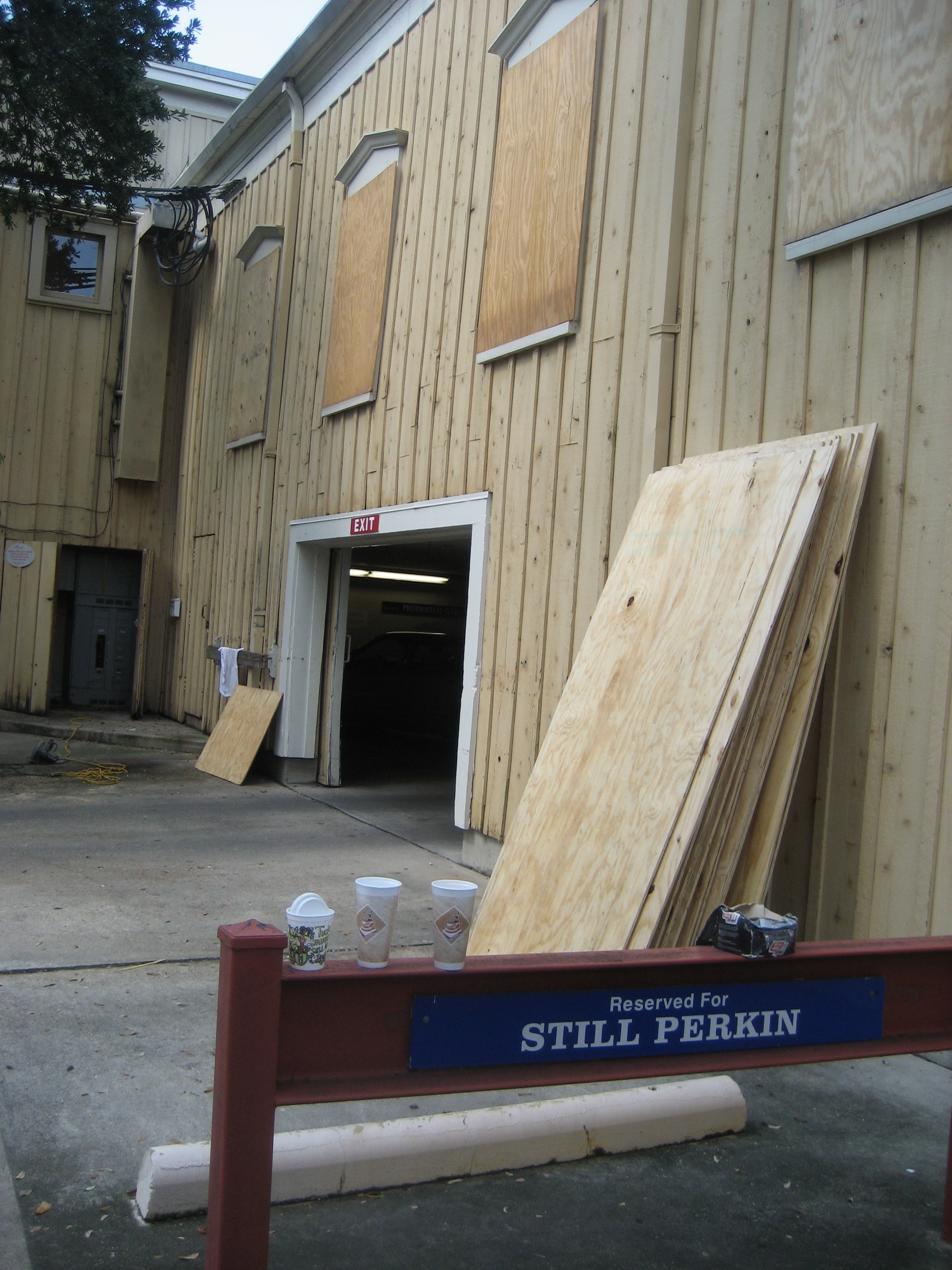
Windows of building in Uptown New Orleans being boarded up in preparation of a possible threat from Hurricane Gustav, August 28, 2008

The next major hurricane threat to the city after Katrina came less than a month later, as Hurricane Rita headed towards the Gulf Coast as the city was still in ruins. Repopulation of some parts of the city had just begun when it was canceled and the city ordered re-evacuation. The levee system again failed, re-flooding low-lying portions of the city such as the Lower Ninth Ward.

Hurricane Ernesto in 2006 originally threatened Louisiana before hitting Florida, causing early preparations and rising oil prices.

Making landfall in Louisiana on September 1, 2008 as a category two hurricane, Hurricane Gustav was the first to put large scale preparations in motion, although the storm was still in Caribbean on the third anniversary of Katrina. Locals were warned to prepare for a possible evacuation of the city. Additional National Guard units were called out, and a state of emergency was declared. No "shelters of last resort" were to be used. Soon afterwards, 1.9 million people were evacuated from southern Louisiana, including 200,000 from the City of New Orleans. Contraflow lanes were again initiated. Forty-three deaths occurred in Louisiana as a result of the storm.

During the category four Hurricane Ida in August 2021, the post-Katrina levee system successfully defended the city, but some suburbs without levees or where levees were still under construction flooded.

== Levee preparations and funding issues ==
While no detailed proposals had yet been made to augment the New Orleans levee system to be capable of withstanding a category 4 or greater hurricane, in October 2004, the Corps of Engineers submitted a proposal to Congress requesting US$4 Million to fund a preliminary study for such a plan. Congress tabled the proposal, never addressing it on the floor, citing budgetary concerns resulting from the Iraq War. A senior Corps official made an off-hand estimate that this project would require approximately $1 Billion dollars and would take 20 years, stating "It's possible to protect New Orleans from a Category 5 hurricane... we've got to start. To do nothing is tantamount to negligence." Whether or not such additional funding might have been capable of preventing the extensive flooding in New Orleans caused by Katrina, is a matter that has yet to be determined.

Starting in 2003, federal spending on the Southeast Louisiana Project was substantially reduced. Lt. General Carl Strock, Chief of Engineers at the Corps of Engineers, said that, "at the time that these levees were designed and constructed, it was felt that that was an adequate level given the probability of an event like this occurring." Strock also said that he did not believed that funding levels contributed to the disaster, commenting that, "the intensity of this storm simply exceeded the design capacity of this levee." Strock also told reporters that the Corps of Engineers "had a 200- or 300-year level of protection. That means that an event that we were protecting from might be exceeded every 200 or 300 years."

From 2001 through 2005, the Bush administration battled with Congress to cut a total of approximately 67% from the budgetary requests from the Corps of Engineers for levee augmentation projects in the New Orleans area, but ultimately settled with Congress on a 50% cut in these budgetary requests. In February 2004, Al Naomi, a project manager for the Corps of Engineers, stated that, "I've got at least six levee construction contracts (in the New Orleans area where funding has been cut) that need to be done to raise the levee protection back to where it should be (because of settling). Right now I owe my contractors about US$5 Million. And we're going to have to pay them interest."

Even as the Bush administration was cutting the Corps of Engineers' budget, many were criticizing the administration for not cutting the budget more. The New York Times, in particular, published several editorials criticizing the large size of the $17 Billion Corps budget, and called for the Senate to cut, "pork," in S. 728, which would have provided $512 Million in funding for hurricane protection projects in southern Louisiana.

Just after Hurricane Katrina hit, there was some concern expressed that government officials had placed an overemphasis on disaster recovery, while neglecting the process of pre-planning and preparation.

In the 17 months following Katrina, five investigations were carried out. The only federally ordered study was conducted by the American Society of Civil Engineers and paid for by the United States Army Corps of Engineers. Two major independent studies were done by the University of California at Berkeley and Louisiana State University. Two minor studies were done by FEMA and the insurance industry. All five studies basically agree on the engineering mechanisms of failure.

The failure mechanisms included overtopping of levees and floodwalls by the storm surge, consequential undermining of flood wall foundations or other weakening by water of the wall foundations, and the storm surge pressures exceeding the strength of the floodwalls. In June 2006, a contrite Lt. Gen Carl Strock took responsibility for the failure of metro New Orleans flood protection, calling the system "a system in name only."

As of August 2006, the Corps of Engineers planned to spend $6 billion to make sure that by 2010, the city would probably be flooded only once every 100 years. But this would not equal the best levee system in the world, which is in The Netherlands. That system is designed to protect populated areas against anything but a 1-in-10,000-years flood. If the Corps built a 1-in-500-year levee system in New Orleans, Ivan van Heerden, deputy director of Louisiana State University's Hurricane Center, says, it would cost $30 billion.

According to a study by the National Academy of Engineering and the National Research Council, levees and floodwalls surrounding New Orleans—no matter how large or sturdy—cannot provide absolute protection against overtopping or failure in extreme events. Levees and floodwalls should be viewed as a way to reduce risks from hurricanes and storm surges, not as measures that eliminate risk. For structures in hazardous areas and residents who do not relocate, the committee recommended major floodproofing measures such as elevating the first floor of buildings to at least the 100-year flood level.

== The impact of Louisiana's sinking coast ==
When the Corps of Engineers started systematically leveeing the river in the 19th century, it cut off the region's main source of silt, the raw material of delta-building in the Mississippi River Delta and the Wetlands of Louisiana. The weight of large buildings and infrastructure and the leaching of water, oil and gas from beneath the surface across the region have also contributed to the problem. Following the great floods of 1927, the Mississippi River was surrounded by a series of levees meant to protect the city from such floods. In 1965, New Orleans was hit by Hurricane Betsy, which caused tremendous flooding in the New Orleans area. The federal government began a levee-building program to protect New Orleans from a Category 3 hurricane (the same strength as Betsy). These series of levees were completed in recent years before Hurricane Katrina.

However, an unintended consequence of the levees was that natural silt deposits from the Mississippi River were unable to replenish the delta, causing the coastal wetlands of Louisiana to wash away and the city of New Orleans to sink even deeper. The Mississippi River delta is subsiding faster than any other place in the nation. While the land is sinking, sea level has been rising. In the past 100 years, land subsidence and sea-level rise have recently added three feet to all storm surges. That extra height puts affected areas under deeper water; it also means flooding from weaker storms and from the outer edges of powerful storms spreads over wider areas. The marshes that ring New Orleans, as well as the land depression of the city itself, originally above sea level, have sunk the quickest.

The problem with the wetlands was further worsened by salt water intrusion caused by the canals dug by the oil companies and private individuals in this marshland. This erosion of the wetlands not only caused Louisiana to lose 24 square miles (62 km^{2}) per year of land annually and 1,900 square miles (4,900 km^{2}) of land since the 1930s, but it also destroyed Louisiana's first line of defense against hurricanes.

Hurricanes draw their strength from the sea, so they quickly weaken and begin to dissipate when they make landfall. Hurricanes moving over fragmenting marshes toward the New Orleans area can retain more strength, and their winds and large waves pack more speed and destructive power. Scientists working for the Louisiana Department of Natural Resources measured some of these effects during Hurricane Andrew in 1992. Andrew's surge height dropped from 9.3 feet (2.8 m) at Cocodrie to 3.3 feet (1.0 m) at the Houma Navigation Canal 23 miles (37 km) to the north. For every mile of the marsh-and-water landscape it traversed, it lost 3.1 inches of height, sparing some homes farther north from more flooding. Currently Louisiana has 30% of the total coastal marsh and accounts for 90% of the coastal marsh loss in the lower 48 states. The engineering of the river has basically brought the Gulf of Mexico much closer to New Orleans, making it more vulnerable to hurricanes.

The combination of sinking land and rising seas has placed the Mississippi River delta as much as 3 feet (0.91 m) lower relative to sea level than it was a century ago, and the process continues. That means hurricane floods driven inland from the Gulf have risen by corresponding amounts. Storms that once would not have had much impact can now be devastating events, and flooding now penetrates into places where it has rarely occurred before. The problem also is slowly eroding levee protection, cutting off evacuation routes sooner and putting dozens of communities and valuable infrastructure at risk of being wiped out by the flooding.

State and federal officials have recently pushed a $14 billion plan to rebuild wetlands over the next 30 years, to be funded by oil and gas royalties, called Coast 2050. Louisiana will receive US$540 million under the energy bill enacted in August 2005. More money for this program is likely to come with aid from Hurricane Katrina. The original actual cost needed for the project, however, was $14 billion.

Wetlands have the capacity to absorb storm surges at the rate of 1-foot (0.30 m) per 2.7 miles (4.3 km). However, due to the systematic, long-term nature of wetland loss, and because wetland remediation can take decades, it is not possible to pinpoint blame for wetland loss on any specific Congress, legislature, President, or governor.

== See also ==
- Drainage in New Orleans
- Effects of Hurricane Katrina in New Orleans
- Hurricane Katrina effects by region
- Hurricane preparedness
- Hurricane on the Bayou (2006)
