= Sandy Rosenthal =

American civic activist

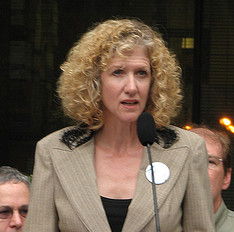
- Rosenthal in 2013
- Born: North Attleboro, Massachusetts
- Education: Mount Holyoke College (B.A., Psychology, 1979); Tulane University (M.B.A., 1981)
- Known for: Founding and leading the nonprofit grassroots group Levees.Org in aftermath of Hurricane Katrina
- Spouse: Stephen Rosenthal
- Children: 3

Sandy Rosenthal is an American civic activist and founder of Levees.Org, an organization created in October 2005 to educate the American public about the cause of the levee failures and catastrophic flooding in New Orleans during Hurricane Katrina.

== Before August 2005 ==
Rosenthal was born in Massachusetts and graduated from Mount Holyoke College in 1979. She settled in New Orleans, Louisiana where she continued working as an active volunteer for her alma mater. In 2005, flooding associated with Hurricane Katrina forced Rosenthal to abandon her home and she began to offer assistance to similarly displaced fellow alumnae.

== Levees.Org ==
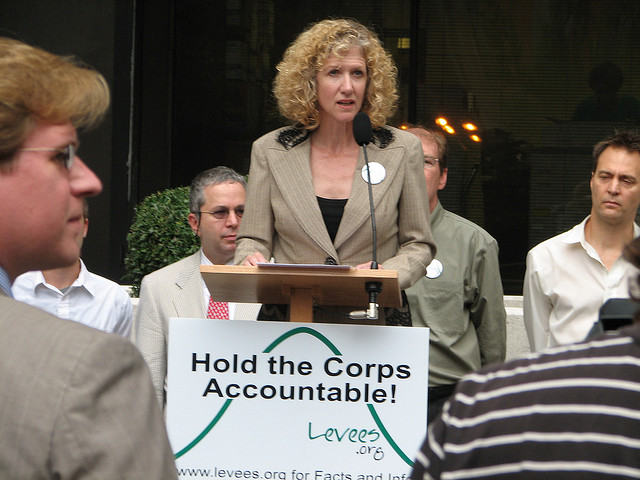
Rosenthal hosts a press conference on the First Anniversary of the Worst Civil Engineering Disaster in U.S. History, August 29, 2006

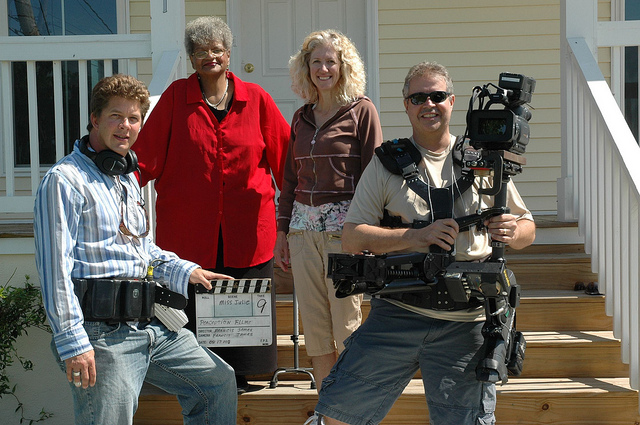
On set in the Lower Ninth Ward, Rosenthal oversees filming of a Public Service Announcement on May 17, 2008

Rosenthal began organizing in response to the official narrative and response to the flooding and evacuation of New Orleans. With the help of her son Stanford Rosenthal, levees.org launched on December 5, 2005, and has since been viewed more than 900,000 times. Rosenthal recruited actors Harry Shearer and John Goodman (both longtime residents of New Orleans), to assist with outreach for the group's message. Using video, social media, letter-writing teams and numerous other means, Levees.Org has educated people worldwide on the facts surrounding the 2005 flooding.

Rosenthal has been a blogger with the Huffington Post since 2009.

== Accolades ==
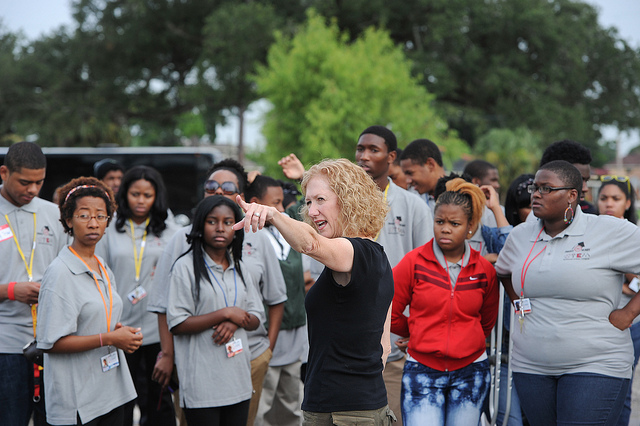
Rosenthal discusses the breach of the London Avenue Canal for The National Urban League Conference in New Orleans, La., July 28, 2012

The Tulane University A. B. Freeman School of Business honored Sandy Rosenthal as the Tulane Outstanding Social Entrepreneur of the Year for 2018. In 2016, Rosenthal was awarded the Pioneer of Purpose Award from Dillard University. In 2015, she received the Diana Lewis Citizen Participation Award from the Committee for a Better New Orleans, the Heroes of the Recovery Award by New Orleans Magazine and also the Partner in Justice Award by AVODAH. In 2012, she was recognized as a “Most Influential Woman” by Mount Holyoke College, and was named “Outstanding Citizen Diplomat” by the New Orleans Citizen Diplomacy Council. That same year she was also named as a “Role Model” by the Young Leadership Council and was honored as a “First Responder, Post Katrina” by the Southern Dominican Province. She has received the "Award of Merit" from the Citizens and Victims against Crime, Inc. (2009), the "Service Above Self" by The Rotary Club of New Orleans (2009), and the "Alumnae Loyalty Award" from Mount Holyoke College (2009). In 2008, she was inducted, along with real estate broker Kitty DeGree of West Monroe, into the Hall of Fame of the Louisiana Center for Women and Government at Nicholls State University in Thibodaux. In 2006 she was one of the "Women of the Year" honored by City Business.

== Words Whispered in Water ==
In her book Words Whispered in Water: Why the Levees Broke in Hurricane Katrina Rosenthal gives a first-person narrative of the 2005 flooding and its aftermath that thrust her into her role as a leading voice for fact-based responses to flood threats. She describes her transformation into an advocate for education on the history of flood control failures after Hurricane Katrina had moved inland, and her subsequent work as a watchdog tracking the responses of government and media in the hours, weeks, and years after the floodwalls first gave way.

Publishers Weekly cited Words Whispered in Water: Why the Levees Broke in Hurricane Katrina as a Fall 2020 selection in Politics & Current Events.
