= Coastal erosion in Louisiana =

Overview of costal erosion in Louisiana

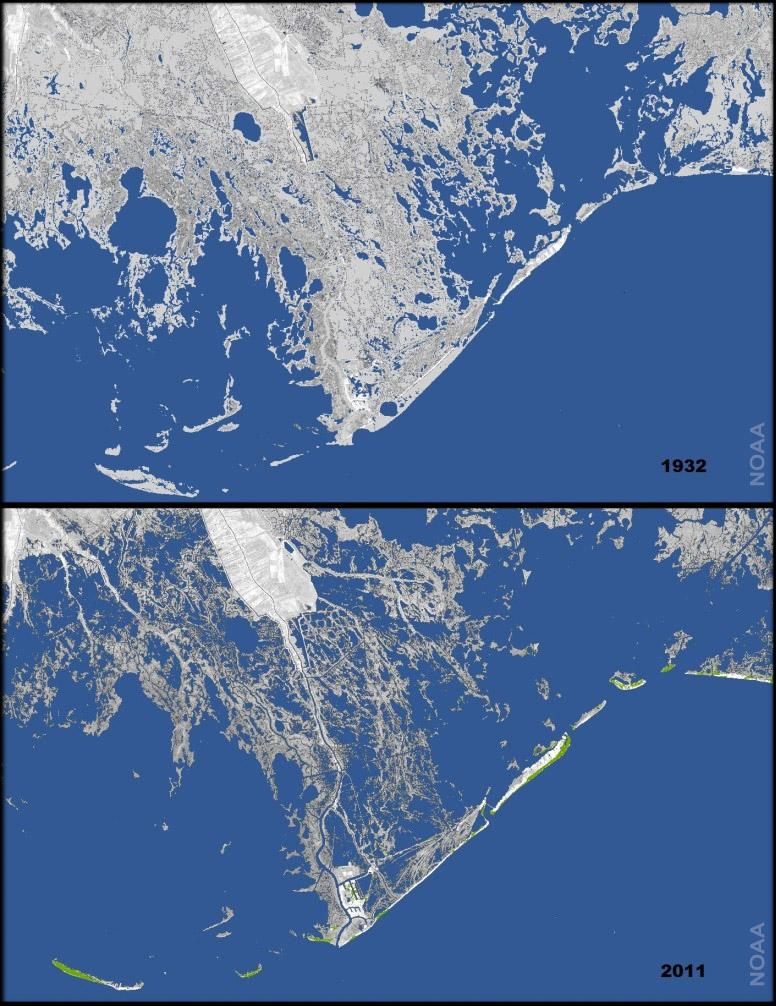
Example of land loss in coastal Louisiana between 1932 and 2011; detail of Port Fourchon area

Coastal erosion in Louisiana is the process of steady depletion of wetlands along the state's coastline in marshes, swamps, and barrier islands, particularly affecting the alluvial basin surrounding the mouth of the Mississippi River. In the last century, coastal Louisiana has lost an estimated 4,833 square kilometers (1,866 sq mi) of land, approximately the size of Delaware's land area. Coast wide rates of wetland change have varied from −83.5 square kilometers (−32.2 sq mi) to −28.01 square kilometers (−10.81 sq mi) annually, with peak loss rates occurring during the 1970's. One consequence of coastal erosion is an increased vulnerability to hurricane storm surges, which affects the New Orleans metropolitan area and other communities in the region. The state has outlined a comprehensive master plan for coastal restoration and has begun to implement various restoration projects such as fresh water diversions, but certain zones will have to be prioritized and targeted for restoration efforts, as it is unlikely that all depleted wetlands can be rehabilitated.

The process of coastal erosion in Louisiana is the result of various factors, including sea level rise; ordinary subsidence of organic materials; deprivation of periodic sediment due to flooding prevention measures; tropical cyclones; oil and gas extraction and infrastructure; navigation infrastructure; and saltwater intrusion. While land subsidence is dominated by Glacial Isostatic Adjustment (GIA), sediment compression is next factor further compounding the problem. Sea level rise attributed to global warming, though not a root cause, is also considered a contributing factor and future concern.

== Causes and factors ==
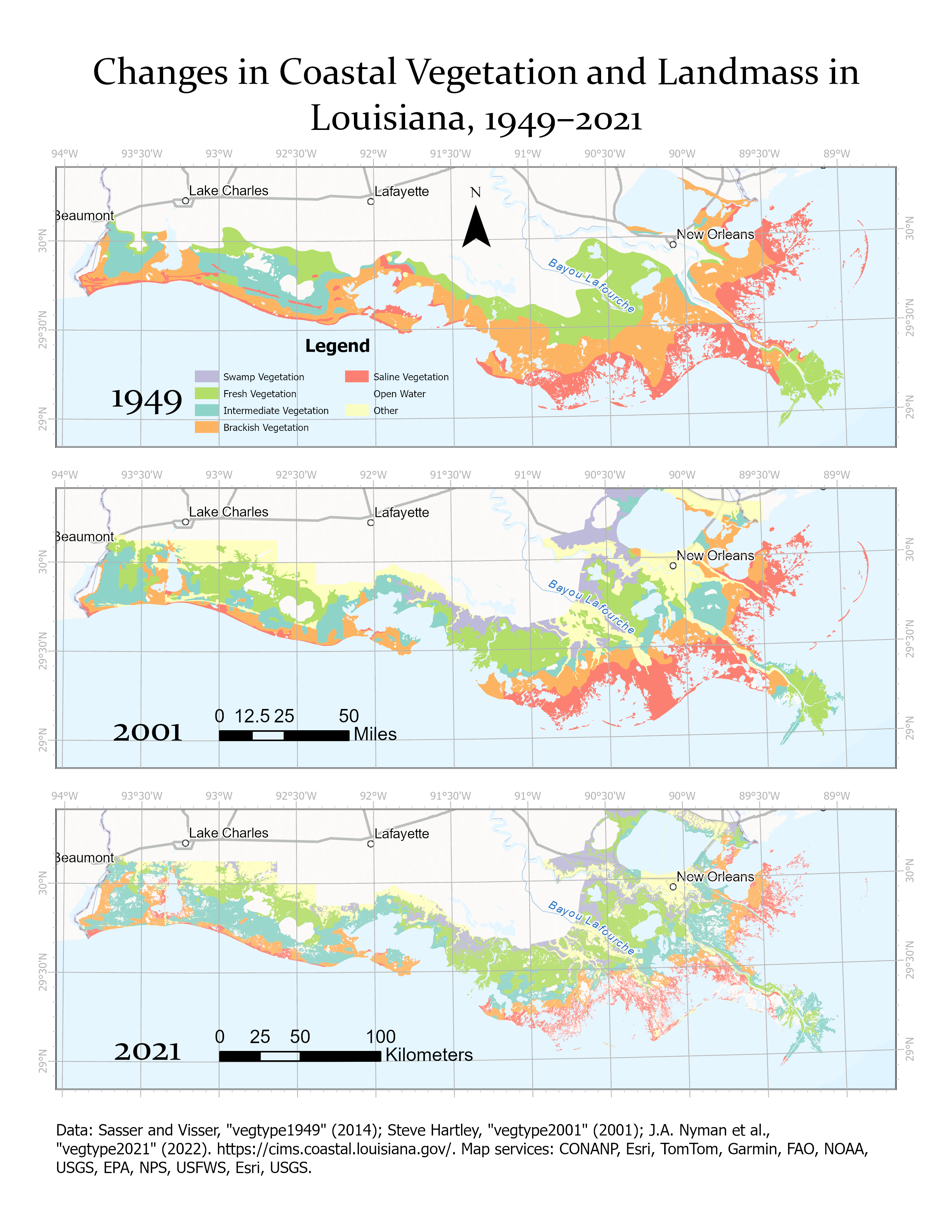
Map of coastal loss, 1949–2021

Estimated Wetland Area Change in Coastal Basins, 1932–2016
Basin	Est. Change	Pct. Starting Area
Terrebonne	−1,302 km^{2} (−503 sq mi)	–29%
Barataria	−1,120 km^{2} (−430 sq mi)	–29%
Calcasieu–Sabine	−517 km^{2} (−200 sq mi)	–24%
Mermentau	−488 km^{2} (−188 sq mi)	–20%
Pontchartrain	−472 km^{2} (−182 sq mi)	–17%
Breton Sound	−426 km^{2} (−164 sq mi)	–38%
Mississippi River	−375 km^{2} (−145 sq mi)	–55%
Teche–Vermilion	−149 km^{2} (−58 sq mi)	–10%
Atchafalaya River	+16 km^{2} (6.2 sq mi)	+3%

An extensive levee system aided by locks and dams has been developed in the waterways of the lower Mississippi River. The levees, designed to prevent flooding along the waterways, on one hand, prevent silt from draining into the river yet also prevent it from being distributed into the marshes downriver. With no new accretion and steady subsidence, the wetlands slowly are replaced by encroaching saltwater from the Gulf. As a result of this apparent dilemma, large areas of marsh are being lost to the ocean. Since 1930 water has consumed more than 1,900 square miles (4,900 km^{2}) of the state's land. This loss equates to the disappearance of 25 square miles (65 km^{2}) of wetlands each year or a football-field-sized area every 30 minutes. This loss can be reversed, at least in some areas, but only with large scale restoration, including the removal of levees to allow the Mississippi River to carry silt into these areas.

Prior to the building of levees on the Mississippi River, the wetlands were kept in balance by occasional floods, which filled the area with sediment, and subsidence, the sinking of land. These man-made levees contribute to extensive down-stream flooding and sediment pollution in the Mississippi River Delta. After the levees were built, however, flood sediment flowed directly into the Gulf of Mexico. This subsidence along with the recent sea level rise tipped the balance toward subsidence rather than marsh growth. This, along with the canals built in the area, caused decline of the wetlands and also caused less weakening of and less protection from recent hurricanes such as Hurricane Katrina. The Lake Pontchartrain Basin Foundation has developed a comprehensive management plan for the eastern regions of the Louisiana coast, placing emphasis upon restoration of riverine habitats, cypress swamps and fringing marsh. This could be a model applied to other coastal regions.

Subsidence may be due to other factors as well. Some observers blame the direct effects of oil and gas extraction, known as fracking. They believe the removal of subsurface materials, such as oil, hastened the rates of land subsidence. They contend that, as billions of barrels of oil and saltwater and trillions of cubic feet of gas were removed from the subterranean structures in which they had accumulated over millions of years, these structures lost their ability to support the weight of the earth above. As these structures slowly collapsed, the soil above gradually subsided. The wetlands on the surface began to sink into the Gulf waters. Others argue that subsidence is a natural process in deltas, as sediments compress, and that the real problem is the lack of flood waters that would normally deposit new layers of sediment. The role of hurricanes is also a matter of disagreement; some studies show that hurricanes actually build elevation in marshes. A new and important factor is the rising sea levels associated with global warming.

Another factor that damaged wetlands was large-scale logging, particularly the extensive logging of cypress forests in the early 1900s. One early logger described it this way: "We just use the old method of going in and cutting down the swamp and tearing it up and bringing the cypress out. When a man's in here with all the heavy equipment, he might as well cut everything he can make a board foot out of; we're not ever coming back in here again." This logging often required construction of canals, which, once the logging was finished, allowed salt water to enter the wetlands and prevent regeneration of the cypress.

The introduction of nutria, an invasive wetland rodent from South America, in the 1930s provided an entirely new species of grazing mammal. Although only a few escaped, there are now millions. Natural grazing by muskrat was now accelerated by grazing from nutria. By removing plants, nutria cause both loss of vegetation and, perhaps more seriously, a loss of dead organic matter which would otherwise accumulate as peat and raise the level of the marsh. One of the most important natural controls on nutria is predation by large alligators, which may provide a useful tool for biological control of nutria, thereby reducing their impact on marshes.

Terrebonne and Lafourche Parishes in Southeast Louisiana, with a combined population of 209,136, are at great risk of going underwater due to coastal erosion. It is estimated with the current rate of erosion, 75 square kilometers a year, these areas and their surrounding parishes will be underwater within fifty to eighty years.

Erosion from heavy storms, climate change, and human interference with the environment contribute to erosion in South Louisiana. The Gulf of Mexico brings heavy rains and hurricanes to this region. This loosens the sediments in the marshes, and along the Mississippi River, allowing them to be carried away by the water.

=== Oil and gas industry ===
Oil and gas extraction in the Louisiana coastal zone began in 1926 and peaked in 1970 with 72 million barrels of oil. Although most oil and gas extraction has shifted offshore to the outer continental shelf, the construction of channels and pipelines continues in the wetlands. Infrastructure, such as canals, pipelines, and other features, contributes to wetland loss not only through direct removal of material but also by altering hydrologic flow: salt water may more easily intrude, and wave action may propagate through canals. For example, the construction of the now-closed Mississippi River Gulf Outlet (MRGO) introduced salt water into freshwater and intermediate marshes in St. Bernard Parish, which is adjacent to New Orleans, and facilitated significant erosion. In addition to the canals themselves, spoil banks also alter local hydrology.

What was then the Orleans Levee Board, now the Southeast Louisiana Flood Protection Authority operating as the East and West divisions, filed a lawsuit in July 2013 against 97 oil and gas companies for damages, claiming the 50 miles of marsh swamps, with stands of cypress that buffered Gulf storms, were "shredded by oil industry canals". It was considered to be an "entire ecosystem tanking", the "largest ecological catastrophe in North America since the dust bowl", and "a wetland dying". “When you talk about dredging those canals, yes, it now appears to have been a pretty stupid thing to do.... But no one ever dreamed it would be an issue or that the coast would waste away.” —John Laborde, Founder, Tidewater Marine, 2010. This was not a new hypothesis as Percy Viosca, a Tulane graduate ultimately fired by then-Governor Long and brought back under another administration, stated in 1925, “Man-made modifications in Louisiana wetlands, which are changing the conditions of existence from its very foundations, are the result of flood protection, deforestation, deepening channels[,] and the cutting of navigation and drainage canals.”, and concluded by stating that the “time is ripe for an enormous development of the Louisiana wetlands along new and [more] intelligent lines.”

== Consequences ==
The many benefits of the wetlands found in this region were not recognized by a majority of policy makers early in the 20th century. Wetlands provide many important ecological services including, fisheries production, resting areas for migratory species, carbon storage, water filtration and enhanced disagreement over the relative importance of these factors, not to mention flood control.

Southeastern Louisiana's disappearing wetlands have a broad impact ranging from cultural to economic. Commercial fishing in Louisiana accounts for more than 300 million dollars of the state's economy. More than 70% of that amount stems from species such as shrimp, oysters and blue crabs that count on the coastal wetlands as a nursery for their young. Annually Louisiana sells more than 330,000 hunting licenses and 900,000 fishing licenses to men and women who depend on the wetlands as a habitat for their game. Additional recreational activities such as boating, swimming, camping, hiking, birding, photography and painting are abundant in wetland areas. Wetlands host a variety of trees such as the bald cypress, tupelo gum and cottonwood. Other plants such as the dwarf palmetto and wax myrtle and submerged aquatic plants such as Vallisneria and Ruppia are native to Louisiana wetlands. Wetland plants act as natural filters, helping to remove heavy metals, sewage, and pesticides from polluted water before reaching the Gulf of Mexico.

As the wetlands disappear, more and more people are leaving wetland areas. Since the coastal wetlands support an economically important coastal fishery, the loss of wetlands is adversely affecting this industry.

Another consequence of coastal erosion is the loss of sandbars off the coast of Louisiana. The sandbars off of Louisiana's coast protect Louisiana's coast from storm surges and high-speed winds that accompany hurricanes from the Gulf of Mexico. In the past, these sandbars have helped minimize the damage to Louisiana's coast from hurricanes. However, as coastal erosion continues to cause these sandbars to degrade, the damage taken by Louisiana's coastline continues to increase.

Because of this loss of Louisiana's coastline, many Louisiana communities are being affected. Some communities are experiencing flooding on a much more regular basis. If this loss of coastline continues, many of these communities will have to relocate. Some communities already have completely located, uprooting everyone who lives there. Therefore, coastal erosion is having a much greater effect on Louisiana residents than many people believe.

== Proposed and attempted solutions ==
There are several projects and proposals to save coastal areas by reducing human damage, some of which have been attempted, including restoring natural floods from the Mississippi. Without such restoration, coastal communities will continue to disappear. One of the primary methods that has been developed are freshwater diversions, which extract water from Mississippi River at strategic locations and transport fresh water and silt from the river through aqueducts and then pump and distribute them into nearby estuaries. Other currently active projects include hydrologic restoration, marsh creation, ridge restoration, and risk reduction to human structures, described below.

The freshwater diversion process invigorates freshwater plant life and re-introduces silt into the estuaries. Freshwater diversions have not been without controversy and have encountered some opposition, primarily from oyster harvesters who believe that the current high level salinity is needed in their state-licensed zones in order to maintain healthy production. Another method of coastal restoration is the direct planting of new marsh grasses and other forms of sustainable plant life into affected areas. There is the practice of seeding, which may be turn out to be more productive than direct planting, which often entails the dropping large amounts of seeds from crop-dusters intended to grow into freshwater plants. Mangrove seeds have been tried because when grown they have the benefit of reducing marsh water salinity. Transporting already-dredged material from the Mississippi river to marshes, swamps, and barrier islands is also an option. Some have proposed the removal of river levees in certain low-populated areas to allow fresh water and silt dispersion into marshes, though this method is controversial and has yet to be attempted.

The Louisiana Coastal Protection and Restoration Authority has developed a master plan which outlines the state's strategy for achieving future coastal restoration as well as flood protection. The plan must be updated every six years; the 4th edition was released in 2023. The 2023 Coastal Master Plan developed by the Louisiana Coastal Protection and Restoration Authority emphasizes large-scale restoration and risk-reduction projects to address ongoing land loss and flood risk along the Louisiana coast. The plan uses updated scientific models to guide coastal investments and prioritizes strategies that restore natural processes within the Mississippi River Delta. One of the most significant proposed projects is the Mid-Barataria Sediment Diversion, which is designed to reconnect the Mississippi River to the Barataria Basin by delivering freshwater, sediment, and nutrients to deteriorating wetlands. Supporters of the project argue that reestablishing sediment delivery is essential for sustaining wetlands and improving long-term coastal resilience. Current Louisiana law stipulates that all oil and gas revenue royalties collected by the state go towards coastal restoration. However, under present arrangements with the federal government, Louisiana is only able to receive a small percentage of royalties, while the rest go to the federal government. Since 2018, Louisiana has been able to receive 37.5 million dollars from all new leases, though pre-existing leases still fall under the prior state/federal revenue sharing arrangement. Proceeds from part of the BP Deepwater Horizon oil spill lawsuits and federal fines have also gone towards coastal restoration.

Estimates are that the area will continue to erode, in part due to a dearth of plant nutrients. Solutions are numerous; however, governments and organizations have problems implementing them. Industry, navigation, and flood control are factors that have to be taken into account with the solutions. One of the most drastic solutions would be diverting the Mississippi river to flow into its delta. A shift in industry locations, navigation, and populations would allow the wetlands to be restored with less interference. Alternatively, increasing sustainability standards would allow the issue to be resolved quicker. Creating more ecologically friendly infrastructure in the areas would allow the marshes to grow and the soil would strengthen.

== See also ==
- Mississippi River Delta
- Mississippi Alluvial Plain
- Wetlands of Louisiana
- Chemistry of wetland dredging
