= Wetlands of Louisiana =

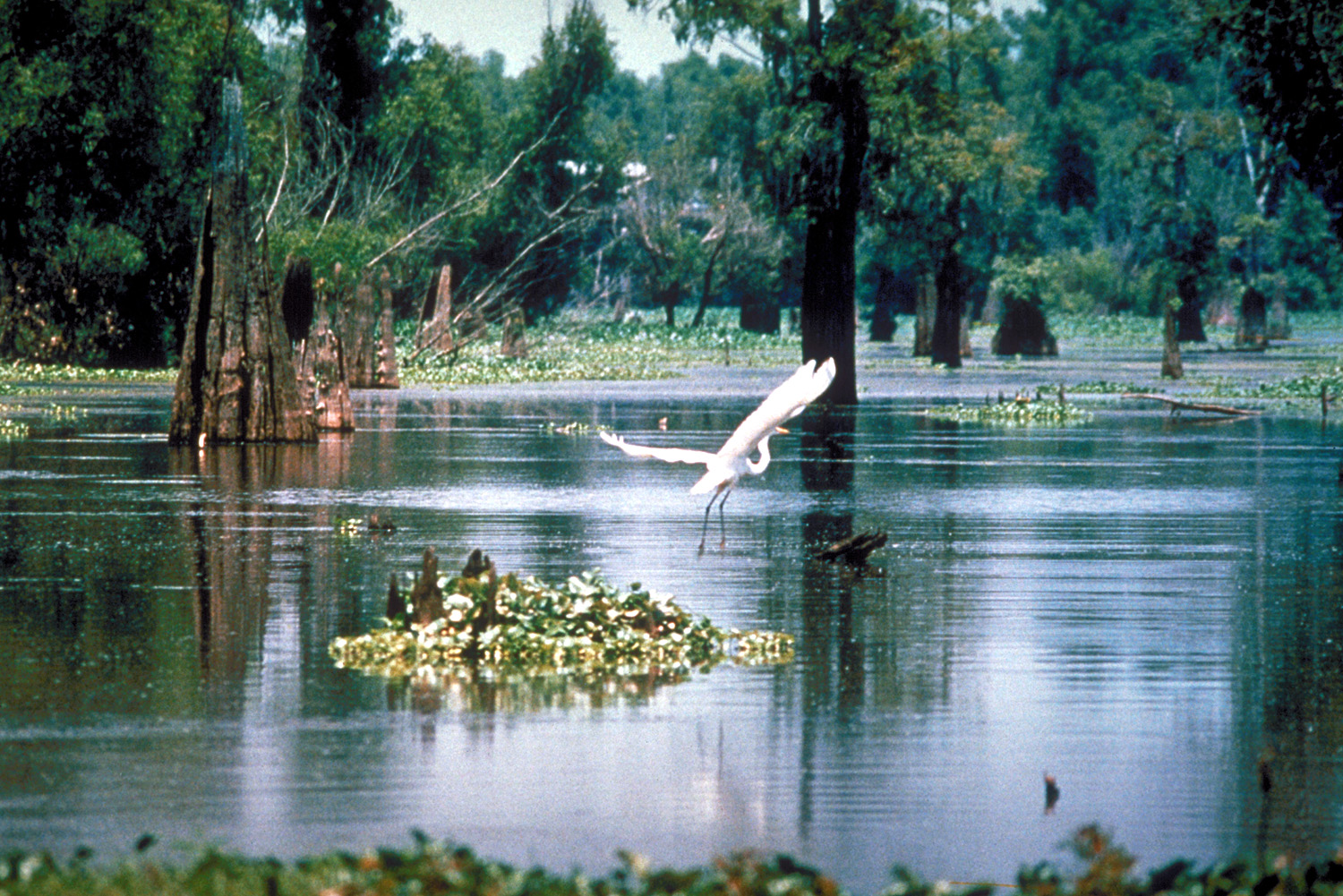
Atchafalaya Basin

The wetlands of Louisiana are water-saturated coastal and swamp regions of southern Louisiana, often called bayous.

The Louisiana coastal zone stretches from the border of Texas to the Mississippi line and comprises two wetland-dominated ecosystems, the Deltaic Plain of the Mississippi River (unit 1, 2, and 3) and the closely linked Chenier Plain (unit 4). The Deltaic Plain contains numerous barrier islands and headlands, such as the Chandeleur Islands, Barataria Basin Barrier Islands, and Terrebonne Basin Barrier Islands. The Coastal Wetlands Planning, Protection and Restoration Act (CWPPRA) program, through the NOAA Habitat Conservation National Marine Fisheries Service funded $102 million in construction for deteriorated wetlands and barrier island habitats.

== Geography ==
The Environmental Protection Agency defines wetlands as "those areas that are inundated or saturated by surface or groundwater at a frequency and duration water to support, and that under normal circumstances do support, a prevalence of vegetation typically adapted for life in saturated soil conditions (e.g. swamps, bogs, fens, marshes, and estuaries)." Different wetland types arise due to a few key factors, primarily: water levels, fertility, natural disturbance and salinity. Around Lake Pontchartrain, for example, these few factors produce wetlands including bottomland hardwoods, cypress swamp, freshwater marsh and brackish marsh. High levels of flooding reduce the abundance of trees, leaving four principal marsh types: saline, brackish, intermediate and fresh.

Although these areas make up a very small percentage of the total land found in the United States, southern Louisiana contains 40 to 45 percent of the wetlands found in the lower states. This is because Louisiana is the drainage gateway to the Gulf of Mexico for the Lower Mississippi Regional Watershed. The Lower Mississippi Regional Watershed drains more than 24 million acres (97,000 km^{2}) in seven states from southern Illinois to the Gulf of Mexico. Hence the wetlands of this area are important at the national scale.

On the east side of Louisiana, coastal wetlands intergrade with long leaf pine savannas, which support many rare and unusual species such as pitcher plants and gopher tortoises. On the western side, they intergrade with wet prairies, an ecosystem type that was once vast, and now has been all but eliminated. The larger vertebrate fauna such as wolves and bison was exterminated. The eastern coastline of Louisiana is much more susceptible to erosion than the western coastline because much of the eastern coastline was created by silt deposits from the Mississippi River. This natural process of sediment deposition has been blocked by an extensive levee system that directs flood water past wetlands. The western coastline is marshy, but the marshes only extend inland by 30 miles (48 km) at the most, then the elevation begins to increase and the marshes fade into solid grounded prairies. Therefore, rising sea levels due to global warming and coastal erosion, may not affect the western coastline as profoundly as it will the eastern half, which may be replaced in open water over substantial areas.

== Loss of the wetlands ==
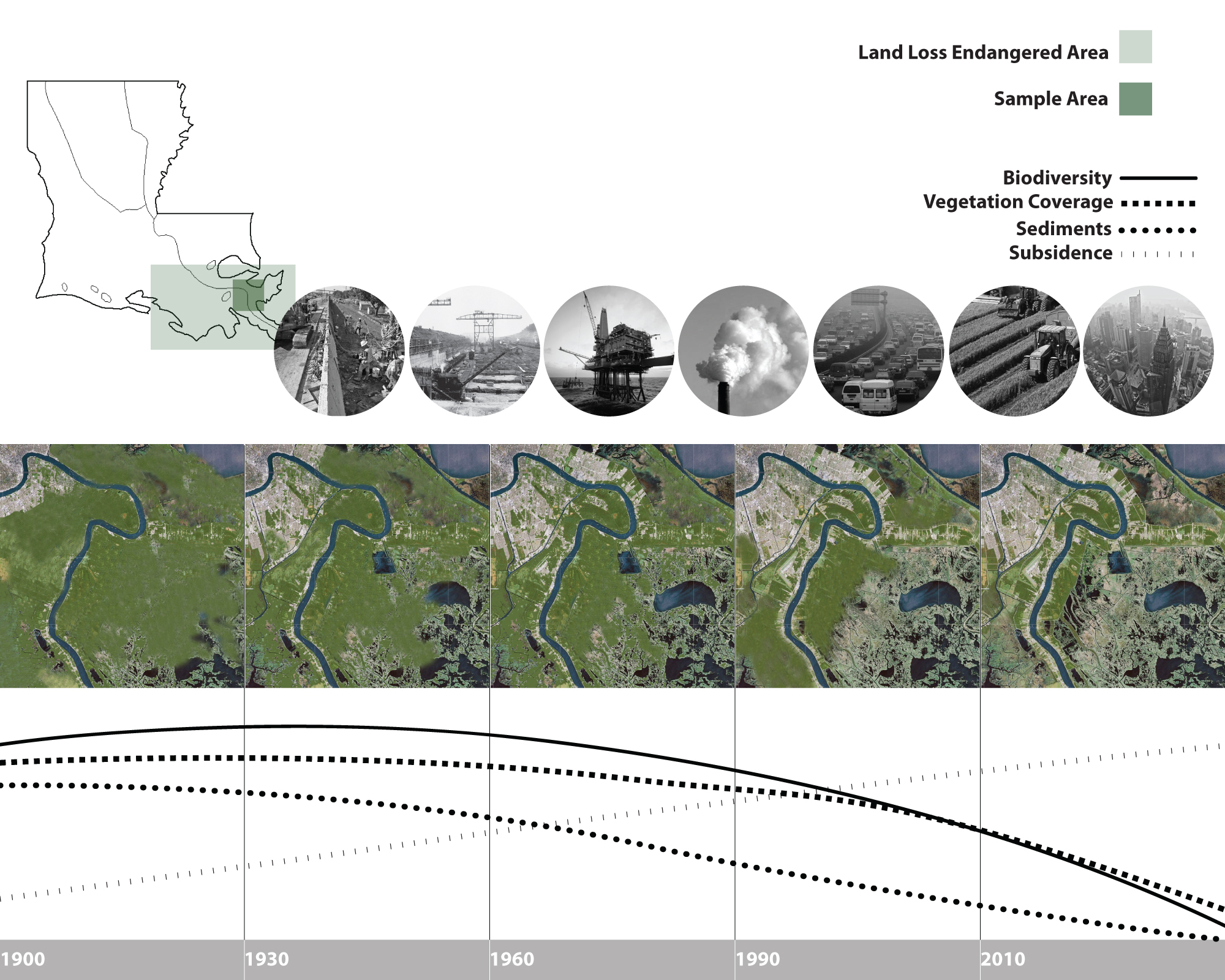
Diorama picturing wetland loss in coastal Louisiana as attributed to human activities

The wide range of benefits provided by the wetlands of this region were not recognized by a majority of policy makers in the early 20th century. Wetlands provide vital ecological services including flood control, fisheries production, carbon storage, and water filtration The two major factors are subsidence, mostly from lack of sediment, and salt water intrusion from canals dredged to service oil and gas wells and facilitate oil and gas exploration. Further wetland loss is attributed to the construction of the now-closed Mississippi River Gulf Outlet, which introduced salt water into freshwater and intermediate marshes and facilitated significant erosion.

Subsidence of the coast can be from the effects of oil and gas extraction. As billions of barrels of oil and saltwater and as trillions of cubic feet of gas were removed from the reservoirs in which they had accumulated over millions of years, these reservoirs lost their ability to support the weight of the rocks above. As these structures slowly collapsed, the soil above gradually subsided. The wetlands on the surface began to sink into the gulf waters. Subsidence is also a natural process in deltas, as sediments compress, and flood waters that would normally deposit new layers of sediment are lacking. The role of hurricanes is also a matter of disagreement; some studies show that hurricanes actually build elevation in marshes. Another factor is rising sea levels estimated to be about 2mm per year associated with global warming.

Sediment compaction is also a significant source of wetland loss. Compaction rates have been conservatively estimated at 5mm to 10mm or more per year for the organic-rich Holocene sediment (peat) that predominates the Mississippi River Delta environment. Given the ubiquity of this compaction-prone sediment in southern Louisiana, coastal restoration project managers (see: Louisiana Coastal Protection and Restoration Authority) must consider the underlying geology of their regions prior to development as to not exacerbate rates of compaction.

An extensive levee system aided by locks and dams has been developed in the waterways of the lower Mississippi River. The levees (designed to prevent flooding along the waterways) prevent needed sediment from being distributed into the marshes downriver. With no new accretion and with steady subsidence, the wetlands slowly are replaced by encroaching saltwater from the Gulf. As a result of this engineering dilemma, large areas of marsh are being lost to the ocean. Since 1930 water has consumed more than 1,900 square miles (4,900 km^{2}) of the state's land. This loss equates to the disappearance of 25 square miles (65 km^{2}) of wetlands each year, or a football field sized area every 30 minutes. This loss can be reversed (at least in some areas) but, only with large scale restoration, including the removal of levees to allow the Mississippi River to carry sediment into these areas.

Another factor that damaged wetlands was large scale logging, particularly the extensive logging of cypress forests in the early 1900s. One early logger described it this way: "We just use the old method of going in and cutting down the swamp and tearing it up and bringing the cypress out. When a man's in here with all the heavy equipment, he might as well cut everything he can make a board foot out of; we're not ever coming back in here again". This logging often required construction of canals, which, once the logging was finished, allowed salt water to enter the wetlands and prevent regeneration of the cypress.

The introduction of nutria from South America in the 1930s provided an entirely new species of grazing mammal. Although only a few escaped, there are now millions. Natural grazing by muskrat was now accelerated by grazing from nutria. By removing plants, nutria both cause loss of vegetation, and, perhaps more seriously, a loss of dead organic matter which would otherwise accumulate as peat and raise the level of the marsh One of the most important natural controls on nutria is large alligators, which may provide a useful tool for biological control of nutria, and therefore for reduced impacts of grazing.

Southern Louisiana's disappearing wetlands have a broad impact ranging from cultural to economic. Commercial fishing in Louisiana accounts for more than 300 million dollars of the state's economy. More than 70% of that amount stems from species such as shrimp, oysters and blue crabs that count on the coastal wetlands as a nursery for their young. Annually Louisiana sells more than 330,000 hunting licenses and 900,000 fishing licenses to men and women who depend on the wetlands as a habitat for their game. Additional recreational activities such as boating, swimming, camping, hiking, birding, photography and painting are abundant in wetland areas. Wetlands host a variety of trees such as the bald cypress, tupelo gum and cottonwood. Other plants such as the dwarf palmetto and wax myrtle and submerged aquatic plants such as Vallisneria and Ruppia are native to Louisiana wetlands. Wetland plants act as natural filters, helping to remove heavy metals, sewage, and pesticides from polluted water before reaching the Gulf of Mexico. Animal species native to these areas include a diversity of birds such as the Osprey, anhinga, American white ibis, Little blue herons, Snowy egrets, Wood ducks, Red-bellied woodpecker, turkey vulture, Pileated woodpecker, some mammals such as the Florida West Indian manatee, North American beaver, and Virginia opossum, a collection of dangerous and non-dangerous reptiles such as the American alligator, the endangered Alligator snapping turtle, Water moccasin, Common musk turtle, Eastern copperhead, red-eared slider, and the gulf coast Smooth softshell turtle, and several freshwater fish species such as the Channel catfish, White crappie, Largemouth bass, Bluegill, Yellow bass, Redear sunfish, and the largest freshwater fish in Louisiana the Alligator gar, along with the Louisiana crawfish which shares the water with the fish. Animal species that are not native to these area but have been introduced by man include the Nutria, and the Silver carp which are both species that do a lot of damage to the native ecosystem. Although there are several naturally occurring forces that adversely affect the wetland regions of Louisiana, many believe it is human intervention that has caused the majority of the decline of many of these species, along with the extinction of both the Ivory-billed woodpecker, and the Carolina Parakeet.

Prior to the building of levees on the Mississippi River, the wetlands were kept in balance by occasional floods, which fill the area with sediment, and subsidence, the sinking of land. After the levees were built, however, flood sediment flowed directly into the Gulf of Mexico. This subsidence along with the recent sea level rise tipped the balance toward subsidence rather than marsh growth. This, along with the canals built in the area, caused decline of the wetlands and also caused less weakening of and less protection from recent hurricanes such as Hurricane Katrina. The Lake Pontchartrain Basin Foundation has developed a comprehensive management plan for the eastern regions of the Louisiana coast, placing emphasis upon restoration of river habitats, cypress swamps and fringing marsh. This could be a model applied to other coastal regions.

=== Oil company canals ===
The dredging of access canals by oil companies has long been considered to be a cause of coastal erosion. These concerns were raised in 1925 and continued with a 2013 lawsuit against many oil companies.

== Policy and protection ==
The National Oceanic and Atmospheric Administration (NOAA) enacted the Coastal Zone Management Act of 1972 (CZMA) amended by 16 U.S.C. 1451 et seq. that includes Louisiana, to develop plans providing assessment priorities for land conservation needs. The agency provides guidance in selecting conservation projects in the state. In 2002 the Secretary of Commerce was directed by Congress to establish the Coastal and Estuarine Land Conservation Program (CELCP), "for the purpose of protecting important coastal and estuarine areas that have significant conservation, recreation, ecological, historical, or aesthetic values, or that are threatened by conversion from their natural or recreational state to other uses", through the Department of Commerce, Justice, and State Appropriations Act of 2002 by Public Law 107-77. This was re-authorized in 2009 by the Omnibus Public Land Management Act (P.L. 111-11).

In 2002, Congress directed the Secretary of Commerce to establish a Coastal and Estuarine Land Conservation Program (CELCP) "for the purpose of protecting important coastal and estuarine areas that have significant conservation, recreation, ecological, historical, or aesthetic values, or that are threatened by conversion from their natural or recreational state to other uses" (The Department of Commerce, Justice, and State Appropriations Act of 2002, Public Law 107-77). CELCP was re-authorized in 2009 as part of the Omnibus Public Land Management Act (P.L. 111-11).

The Louisiana Department of Natural Resources, Office of Coastal Management, Inter-agency Affairs and Field Service Division (LDNR/OCM/IAFSD) became the lead agency for implementing a state coastal management program, or CELCP program, based on federal guidelines. Louisiana chose the conditionally approved Coastal Nonpoint Pollution Control Program (CNPCP) boundaries. On January 23, 2008, the Governor of Louisiana signed Executive Order No. BJ 2008-7, creating the Coastal Protection and Restoration Authority (CPRA), that implemented the Integrated Ecosystem Restoration and Hurricane Protection plan, becoming known as the "Master Plan".

== See also ==
- Terrebonne Basin
- Atchafalaya Basin
- Bayou
- Coastal management
- Coastal Wetlands Planning, Protection and Restoration Act
- Hurricane Rita
- Hurricane Katrina
- Mississippi River Delta
- National Wetlands Research Center
- Swamp People
- Hurricane on the Bayou
- Chemistry of wetland dredging
