= USS Breton =

Two ships of the United States Navy have been named Breton, after the Breton Sound of the Louisiana coast.

- USS Breton (CVE-10), was a Bogue-class escort carrier loaned to the Royal Navy and operated as HMS Chaser from 1943 to 1946.
- USS Breton (CVE-23), was a Bogue-class escort carrier, in service from 1943 to 1946.
