= Land loss =

Erosion process

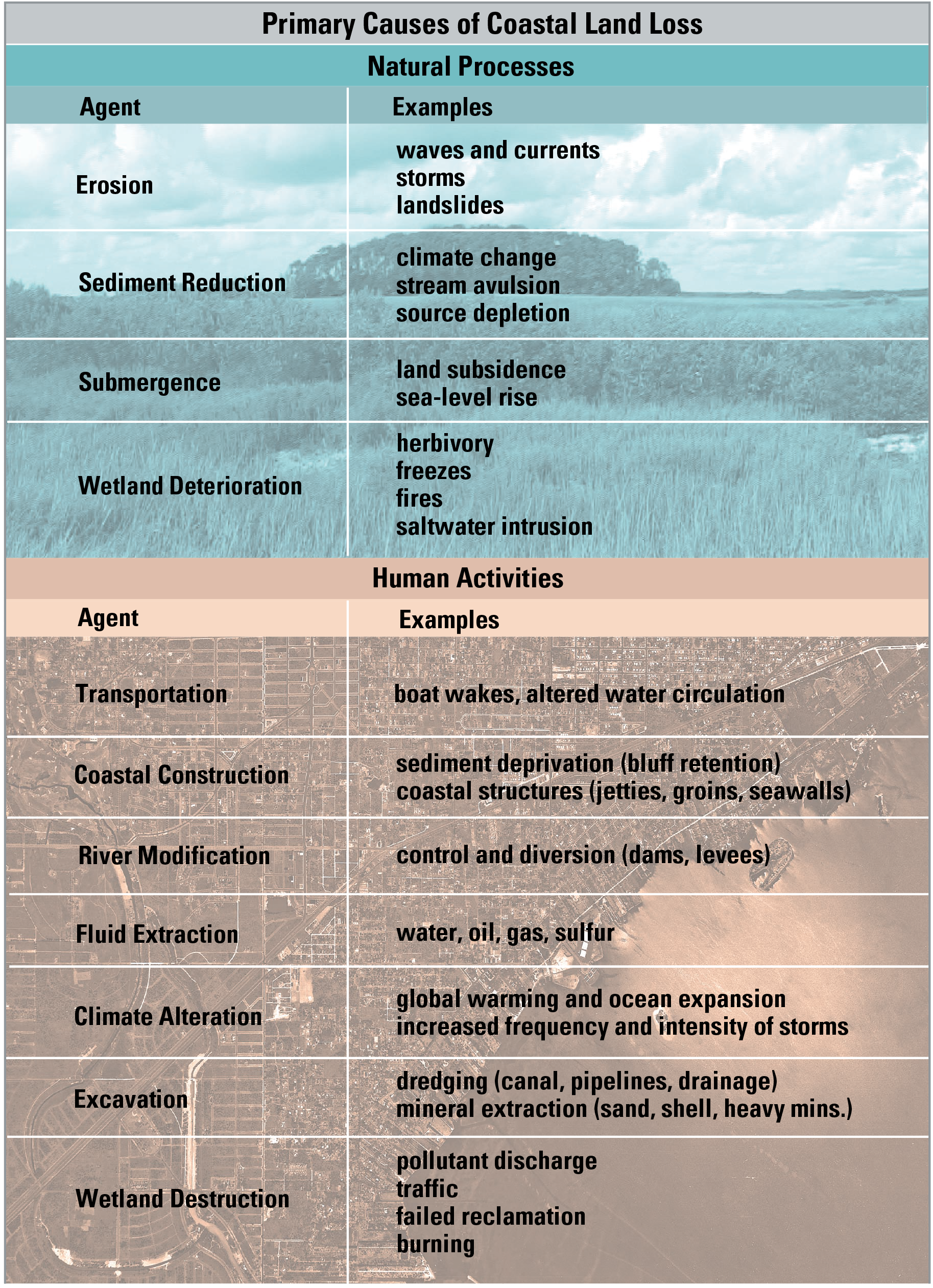
Summary table of the common physical and anthropogenic causes of coastal land loss.

Land loss is the term typically used to refer to the conversion of coastal land to open water by natural processes and human activities. The term land loss includes coastal erosion. It is a much broader term than coastal erosion because land loss also includes land converted to open water around the edges of estuaries and interior bays and lakes and by subsidence of coastal plain wetlands. The most important causes of land loss in coastal plains are erosion, inadequate sediment supply to beaches and wetlands, subsidence, and global sea level rise. The mixture of processes responsible for most of the land loss will vary according to the specific part of a coastal plain being examined. The definition of land loss does not include the loss of coastal lands to agricultural use, urbanization, or other development.

== Wetland loss ==
Although seemingly related, wetland loss, is defined differently than land loss. Commonly, wetland loss is defined as the conversion of vegetated wetlands into either uplands or drained areas, unvegetated wetlands (e.g., mudflats), or (submerged habitats (open water). According to this, and similar definitions, wetland loss includes both land loss and land consumption as components of it. In historic times, both wetland and land loss typically are the result of a varying, often controversial mixture of natural and anthropogenic factors. There are other definitions of wetland loss commonly used. For example, some researchers defined wetland loss as "the substantial removal of wetland from its ecologic role under natural conditions."

== Land loss mechanisms ==
The main causes of land loss are coastal erosion, inadequate sediment supply, subsidence, and sea level rise. Coastal erosion occurs when the rate of sediment deposition is slower than the rate of sediment removal by coastal currents. The most important cause of decreased rates of sediment deposition is the construction of dams and reservoirs although sediment control and conservation programs can also play a role. Once a dam is constructed, sediment that previously traveled freely in the river is trapped in the reservoir. Decreased sediment loads downstream of the dam prevent sediment from replenishing the delta. Subsidence is the compaction of soil resulting in a lower elevation. Subsidence can occur when oil, gas, or groundwater are extracted. These substances hold the land up until they are removed. Compaction due to heavy urban infrastructure also occurs. Sea level rise due to climate change is another threat to coastal land.

== Land loss and deltas ==
A simplified figure showing coastal erosion, sediment starvation, subsidence, and sea level rise, the main mechanisms causing delta land loss.

Because of a highly variable combination of sea level rise, sediment starvation, coastal erosion, wetland deterioration, subsidence, and various human activities, land loss within delta plains is a significant global problem. The large delta plains of the world, including the Danube, Ganges, Brahmaputra, Indus, Mahanadi, Mangoky, McKenzie, Mississippi, Niger, Nile, Shatt el Arab, Volga, Yellow, Yukon, and Zambezi deltas, have all suffered significant land loss as the result of either coastal erosion, internal conversion of wetlands to open water, or a combination of both. For the 15 deltas studied by Coleman and others, these deltas experienced a total irreversible land loss of 5,104 km^{2} (1,971 sq mi) of wetlands between the early 1980s and 2002. During this period, the total average land loss for all these deltas was about 41 km^{2} (16 sq mi) per year. In the case of the Mississippi River Delta, they found that in 12 years, some 253 km^{2} (98 sq mi) of wetlands had been converted to new open water at a rate of 21 km^{2} (8.1 sq mi) per year. The factors contributing to land loss in the deltas below do not include the direct conversion of delta wetlands into agricultural or urban land, although this is happening concurrently in many of them.

- The Danube Delta is located in Romania and Ukraine where the Danube River enters into the Black Sea. The loss of this delta is primarily due to sediment starvation caused by dams along the river. After the construction of the two largest of these dams, the Iron Gates dams, sediment in the river decreased by 60% - 70%.
- The Ganges Delta forms where the combined waters of the Ganges and Brahmaputra rivers enter the Bay of Bengal. The delta is damaged by sediment starvation due to the construction of many upstream dams. The location is also susceptible to sea level rise, with most of the delta below 5 m in elevation.
- The Indus River Delta forms as the Indus River enters the Arabian Sea in India and Pakistan. The construction of barrages and reservoirs for irrigation has drastically reduced the flow of the Indus and its ability to carry sediment.
- The Mahanadi River Delta forms where the Mahanadi, Brahmani, and Baitarini rivers enter into the Bay of Bengal on the east coast of India. Similar to the Ganges River Delta, significant amounts of the Mahanadi Delta are below 5 m in elevation and are threatened by sea level rise. Dams for irrigation and flood control, including the Hirakud Dam, contribute to sediment starvation. 65% of the coastline faces erosion.
- The Mangoky River Delta is formed by the Mangoky River draining into the Mozambique Channel off the west coast of Madagascar. Mangrove forests face deforestation by coastal fishermen and inland farmers, increasing coastal erosion.
- The Mackenzie River Delta is formed by the Mackenzie River in Canada flowing north into the Arctic Ocean. Rising sea levels combined with the melting of permafrost near the permafrost table results in land subsidence.
- For the Mississippi River Delta see Mississippi River Delta page.
- The Niger Delta is formed by the Niger River entering into the Gulf of Guinea on the west coast of Africa. Dams, erosion, and subsidence due to wetland conversion are the major contributing factors to loss of the delta.
- The Nile River Delta is formed by the Nile River flowing north through Egypt and entering into the Mediterranean Sea. The primary reason for Nile Delta loss is sediment entrapment behind the Aswan dams. Secondary reasons include subsidence, sea level rise, and strong coastal currents.
- The Shatt al-Arab River Delta is formed when the Shatt al-Arab River flows into the Persian Gulf. The river itself is formed by the joining of the Tigris and Euphrates rivers. A decrease in freshwater entering the river due to irrigation and, thus, a decrease in sediment load has increased coastal erosion of the delta. Hydraulic structures and sea level rise also play a role in the loss of the delta.
- The Volga Delta is formed when the Volga River enters into the Caspian Sea in Russia. It has gained land with the drop in the level of the Caspian Sea. As the water level has risen again in the last twenty years, the delta has still not experienced any loss. As the terms are defined above, the delta has experienced wetland loss but not land loss.
- The Yellow River Delta is formed as the Yellow River flows into the Yellow Sea. The Yellow River flows through the Loess Plateau and carries large amounts of sediment. Until 1998, the Yellow River Delta was expanding, but it has been decreasing ever since. Many dams have been constructed on the Yellow River and are starving the coastline of sediment.
- The Yukon River Delta is formed when the Yukon and Kuskokwim rivers enter into the Bering Sea in Alaska. The delta is threatened by sea level rise; an increase of 0.5 m would increase erosion due to higher tides. Inactive floodplains where tides and sedimentation rates are not in equilibrium are most at risk.
- The Zambezi River Delta is formed when the Zambezi River enters the Mozambique Channel off of the east coast of Africa. The construction of the Kariba Dam, the Cahora Bassa Dam, and dykes have altered natural flooding and sediment deposition. The delta coast is in a state of erosion due to sediment starvation and a slowly rising sea level.

== Territorial Loss ==
Climate change-driven rise of sea levels may pose an existential threat to various states. Several low-lying island states, including Tuvalu, Kiribati, the Marshall Islands, and the Maldives, face the prospect of losing some or all of their physical territory within the coming decades, raising an unresolved question in international law whether a state can continue to exist if its land territory no longer exists.

=== Proposed responses to territorial loss ===
Legal scholars and the affected states themselves have proposed several non-exclusive approaches by which a state might preserve its statehood, its population, or both, in the face of severe or total territorial loss.

==== Nations ex situ ====
A “nation ex situ” is a state that has lost its land-based territory and continues to be treated as a sovereign state, retaining the rights of statehood despite being is “de territorialized”. Tuvalu, expected to be one of the first nations to be completely lost due to rising sea levels, enacted a constitutional amendment which states that “[t]he State of Tuvalu within its historical, cultural and legal framework shall remain in perpetuity in the future, notwithstanding the impacts of climate change or other causes resulting in loss to the physical territory of Tuvalu”. In order to ensure Tuvalu’s survival, Foreign Minister Simon Kofe said during COP27 that the country would become the “First Digital Nation”, digitising government functions, historical records, and cultural material so that Tuvalu’s identity and governmental operations could continue even if its territory disappears entirely and called on all the nations to recognise its statehood even if it loses all the land territory.Through its “Future Now Project,” Tuvalu has also sought bilateral commitments from other states to recognise its statehood and existing maritime boundaries as permanent and even if Tuvalu completely disappears, the establishment of a digital nation would enable it to maintain its identity and carry on as a state. Some States, including Venezuela, the Bahamas, Saint Kitts, St Lucia, Vanuatu, Niue, Palau, Gabon, and Taiwan have recognised Tuvalu’s Statehood as permanent.

==== Creation of artificial territory ====
States have long constructed artificial islands fixed to the seabed. The construction of man-made islands, which remain above water at high tide and which are permanently fixed to the bottom of the sea, is exercised by many nations. But the only shortcoming with such habitable islands is that they are not officially recognised by International Law as a “state”. China began constructing and expanding artificial islands in disputed areas of the South China Sea, including the Spratly Islands, from around 2014.The United Arab Emirates has constructed large artificial islands such as Palm Jumeirah for tourism and housing,and the Maldives began construction of the artificial island of Hulhumalé in 1997, partly in response to rising seas.Additionally, in Maritime Delimitation and Territorial Questions between Qatar and Bahrain (2001), the International Court of Justice observed that international treaty law does not address whether low-tide elevations qualify as “territory,” and that state practice on the question was not sufficiently consistent to have produced a customary rule either permitting or prohibiting their appropriation.

==== Purchasing Territory ====
In the late 2000s, the Maldives was the first State to consider the idea of buying land in India or Sri Lanka as an insurance policy against climate change induced rising sea levels. In 2014, Kiribati completed the purchase of the roughly 2,200-hectare Natoavatu Estate on Vanua Levu, Fiji's second-largest island, for US$8.6 million, in an effort to strengthen its food and economic security in the face of climate change. In most cases, however, the seller State maintains formal sovereignty over the territory.For example, Kiribati’s purchase of Fiji territory did not confer sovereignty over the land instead Kiribati became a mere private owner of the land. In this capacity, Kiribati had the right to occupy the land subject to the purchase, extract its natural resources and construct buildings, but the territorial State, Fiji, retains sovereignty over the land.Sovereignty is only transferred to the buying State if the seller State renounces its sovereignty over the transferred territory through the signing of a treaty. Given the rarity of this practice in modern international relations and the fact that it does not include the surrender of sovereignty over the leased or purchased area and purchasing territory is generally considered an unlikely full solution to territorial extinction, though it may provide a partial one if ownership and sovereignty are treated as separable.

==== Moving Population ====
Under this scenario, much or all of the population of the displaced state relocates to another state’s territory. The displaced state is given administrative authority by the receiving state. It may also indicate who owns the land. Nonetheless, the land would remain a part of the receiving state’s sovereign territory. The agreement between the sending and receiving states would have to address issues including the nationality of the relocated individuals, their ability to vote and exercise other political rights, and their accountability for governance.

In 2006, residents of Lohachara Island in the Bay of Bengal, whose landmass had eroded away, relocated to nearby Sagar Island; in 2007, residents of Papua New Guinea's Carteret Islands began being evacuated to nearby Bougainville, in what is often described as one of the first relocations attributed to climate change.

International Lawyer, Rosemary G. Rayfuse, has pointed to an earlier historical precedent, describing this approach where, during the 1870s, tens of thousands of Icelanders were driven out of Iceland as a result of crushing poverty exacerbated by a devastating volcanic eruption that destroyed half the island. The Canadian government entered into an agreement with these settlers granting them a suitably large piece of land for their new colony, providing them with funding and livestock to assist in their resettlement, and guaranteeing their rights both as citizens of Canada and of Iceland for themselves and their descendants. The colony of New Iceland was run by a government committee elected from amongst the settlers. Located in what is now southern Manitoba, New Iceland eventually joined the province of Manitoba becoming fully integrated into Canada.

==== Moving State ====
This scenario resembles moving population, except that the receiving state cedes sovereignty over the territory as well as its use, typically through a treaty of cession. This would be accomplished by a treaty of cession. That is how the United States acquired the Louisiana Territories from France in 1803and what is now Alaska from Russia in 1867, and the Holy See’s acquisition of Vatican City from Italy under the 1929 Lateran Treaty.A major difficulty with both the moving-population and moving-state approaches is the position of the current inhabitants of any territory offered for this purpose is that most of the world’s habitable land is already occupied, and the limited economic resources of small island states would make it very difficult for them to negotiate the purchase of a substantial new territory. The majority of the planet’s livable areas are currently occupied and also considering that these islands are economically vulnerable and challenged it would be very difficult to negotiate if they want to buy a piece of territory.

==== Association with Another State ====
Some states have merged with, confederated with, or entered hybrid governance arrangements with others, a practice partly formalised by the 1978 Vienna Convention on Succession of States in respect of Treaties.In 1964, the small island state of Zanzibar, in the Indian Ocean, merged with the much larger nearby Tanganyika to form the United Republic of Tanzania and in 1990,the Yemen Arab Republic and the People’s Democratic Republic of Yemen merged to become the Republic of Yemen. However, all of these resulted from political and not environmental developments. Association can produce a range of governance outcomes, from full absorption to a significant degree of continued self-government like the Cook Islands, for instance, are considered part of the “Realm of New Zealand” but have been self-governing since 1965, and Cook Islanders remain New Zealand citizens and hold New Zealand passports.

== See also ==
- Coastal erosion in Louisiana
- Wetlands of Louisiana
