= Texan by Nature =

Conservation nonprofit in Texas, US

Texan by Nature, originally formed in 2011 as Taking Care of Texas, is a 501(c)(3) nonprofit focusing on uniting business and conservation. Texan by Nature is headquartered at Austin, Texas.

== History ==
Texan by Nature was founded by former First Lady Laura Bush in 2011. Its stated mission is to, "align the broad interests of conservation groups with the resources of businesses, health care institutions, schools, the scientific community, and faith-based organizations [to] ... collectively create a positive impact for Texas’ economy, people, and land for generations to come".

== Programs ==
=== Conservation Wrangler Program ===
Each year, Texan by Nature selects innovative projects from across Texas. These projects must be science based, with measurable outcomes and data.

=== 2020 Conservation Wranglers ===
Exploration Green Conservancy -

Respect Big Bend

Trinity Park Conservancy - Trinity River Conservation Corps

Paso del Norte Trail

Texas Brigades

Texas Children in Nature

2019 Conservation Wranglers

Certified Water Program

Trinity River Paddling Trail

Rio Grande Valley Reef Restoration

Oyster Shell Recycling Program

Grassland Restoration Incentive Program

Texas Prairie Wetlands Program

==== 2018 Conservation Wranglers ====
Building Conservation Trust – Oyster Reef Restoration

Building Conservation Trust (the National Habitat Program of Coastal Conservation Association) and Coastal Conservation Association Texas restored oyster habitat in Sabine Lake.

Constructed wetlands

Tarrant Regional Water District, Texas Parks and Wildlife Department, North Texas Municipal Water District, the John Bunker Sands Wetland Center, the Rosewood Corporation, and Alan Plummer Associates partnered to create over 4,000 acres of wetlands to showcase a sustainable approach for natural water filtration. The wetlands provide water supply to over 3.8 million people in the Dallas/Fort Worth area, and provide habitat for local wildlife.

Cool schools

Dallas Independent School District partnered with the Texas Trees Foundation to reduce urban heat at Dallas elementary schools. Eighty trees are planted per school with the goal to maintain a tree canopy cover, create outdoor learning environments, provide STEM-based curriculum, and to enhance experiential learning.

Dark Skies Initiative

Working with the Permian Basin Petroleum Association and the Texas Oil & Gas Association, McDonald Observatory of the University of Texas published a "Recommended Lighting Practices" guide. They have also partnered with the Apache Corporation to produce a video.

The practices reduce light pollution, have greater cost efficiency, and improve visibility and increase worker safety in the oil field.

El Carmen Land & Conservation Co.

El Carmen Land and Conservation Company, owned by CEMEX USA and Mr. Josiah Austin, is working on desert restoration and habitat enhancement in the Trans-Pecos.

Texas Playa Conservation Initiative

The Texas Playa Conservation Initiative is working to restore the playas in the Panhandle.

Partners for this project include Texas Parks and Wildlife, Playa Lakes Joint Venture, Natural Resources Conservation Service, US Fish and Wildlife Service, and Ducks Unlimited.

2017 Conservation Wranglers

Lake Livingston Friends of Reservoirs]

Lower Rio Grande Valley Learning Landscapes Collaborative

2014 Conservation Wranglers

Texas State Bison Herd

Texas Botanical Gardens and Native American Interpretive Center

Bracken Bat Cave

=== TxN Project Certification ===
The Texan by Nature Project Certification provides Texan employers, organizations, and individuals with recognition of their conservation efforts.

=== Symposia Series ===
South-Central Monarch Symposium

The South-Central Monarch Symposium took place May 31-June 1, 2017, at the Lady Bird Johnson Wildflower Center. Over 200 monarch conservation partners attended the event. Over 50 speakers presented their research, ranging from milkweed availability, distribution, and resources to private landowner perspectives.

The goals of the symposium included consolidating data on the monarch butterfly migration and identifying gaps in current scientific understanding and habitat management practices.

On July 18, 2018, Data and Project Manager Amy Snelgrove provided testimony of the findings from the symposium to the Texas House of Representatives' Committee on Culture Recreation & Tourism.

On August 10, 2018, the South-Central Monarch Conservation Community became live. This is a community to bring monarch researchers and conservation professionals together to recover the butterfly throughout Texas and Oklahoma.

Topics include:

- Communication & Outreach
- Funding
- Habitat Conservation
- Research
- Texas Monarch Consortium

A Natural Connection: Exploring Positive Outcomes in Health and Healing Through Nature

Texan by Nature co-hosted the symposium with Houston Methodist to discuss and identify gaps in the science between the mechanisms in nature that produce positive physiological and psychological health and healing benefits. Top researchers, physicians, and policymakers gathered to share their knowledge on the connections between health and nature and discussed their findings.

On May 2, 2018, a partnership between Texan by Nature, Houston Methodist Hospital, and Texas A&M University System was announced to form the Center for Health and Nature in Houston, Texas. Two research projects are currently being developed:

- Designing Systems to Prevent Physician & Nurse Burnout
- Heart Health and Nature

The Center for Health and Nature is planning for its 2019 Symposium for February 13, 2019.

=== Conservation Wrangler Summit ===
Texan by Nature and Mrs. Bush hosted the first Conservation Wrangler Summit in 2018 to celebrate the best Conservation Wrangler projects. The now yearly event draws leaders from across Texas to share insights and efforts making impact in areas of conservation and sustainability.

=== Texan by Nature 20 (TxN20) ===
In 2019 Texan by Nature partnered with Texas Monthly to rank the top 20 companies in Texas working to push conservation forward. Over 2,000 Texas-based companies were evaluated by a 14-point grading system resulting in the top 20 businesses committed to conservation efforts.

"The TxN 20 is an effort to recognize innovation and best practices in conservation coming from Texas-based businesses," Texan by Nature CEO and President, Joni Carswell.

==== TxN 20 2019 Honorees ====
1. American Campus Communities
2. Apache
3. Austin Convention Center
4. Cactus Feeders
5. CEMEX
6. Cirrus Logic
7. Comerica
8. Darling Ingredients
9. Dell
10. DFW Airport
11. Farmer Brothers
12. Harvest Seasonal Kitchen
13. H-E-B
14. King Land & Water
15. NRG Energy
16. Parkland Health & Hospital System
17. Phillips 66
18. Southwest Airlines
19. Texas Health Resources
20. Union Pacific

=== Deep in the Heart ===
Texan by Nature is a primary sponsor of this wild life documentary that showcases Texas conservation and ecological issues through the eyes of wildlife. Deep in the Heart is a project led by Ben Masters of Fin and Fur Films.

== Conservation Partners ==
Description of Conservation Partners

List of Conservation Partners

- America's Wetland Foundation
- Armand Bayou Nature Center
- Audubon Texas
- Bat Conservation International
- Borderlands Research Institute/Sul Ross State University
- Botanical Research Institute of Texas
- Caesar Klegberg Wildlife Research Institute
- Cibolo Nature Center and Farm
- Coastal Conservation Association
- Dixon Water Foundation
- EarthX
- East Foundation
- Environmental Defense Fund
- Fort Worth Stock Show & Rodeo
- Galveston Bay Foundation
- Greater Edwards Aquifer Alliance
- Harte Research Institute/Texas A&M University Corpus Christi
- Headwaters at the Comal
- Hill County Alliance
- Hill Country Conservancy
- Houston Wilderness
- I-20 Wildlife Preserve
- John Bunker Sands Wetland Center
- Lady Bird Johnson Wildflower Center
- Land Trust Alliance
- Monarch Joint Venture
- National Butterfly Center
- National Fish and Wildlife Foundation
- National Ranching Heritage Center
- Native Plant Society of Texas
- Prescribed Burn Alliance of Texas
- San Antonio Botanical Garden
- Sand County Foundation
- South Texans' Property Rights Association
- South Texas Natives – CKWRI
- Texas A&M Natural Resources Institute
- Texas Agricultural Land Trust
- Texas AgriLife Extension Services
- Texas Bighorn Society
- Texas Botanical Gardens and Native American Interpretive Center
- Texas Brigades
- Texas Children in Nature
- Texas Commission on Environmental Quality
- Texas Conservation Alliance
- Texas A&M Forest Service
- Texas Land Conservancy
- Texas Land Trust Council
- Texas Master Naturalist
- Texas Native Seeds – CKWRI
- Texas Parks & Wildlife Department
- Texas Parks & Wildlife Foundation
- Texas Water Resources Institute
- Texas Wildlife Association
- The Frontera Land Alliance
- The Nature Conservancy
- The Witte Museum
- Tom Lea Institute
- Trinity Park Conservancy
- Trinity Waters
- U.S. Fish & Wildlife Service
- Wildlife Habitat Federation

== Board Members ==
2020

Laura Bush, Founder

Neal Wilkins, Ph.D., Chairman

Cynthia Pickett-Stevenson, Vice Chairman

Tamara Trial, Secretary

Regan Gammon, Treasurer

Katharine Armstron

Marc Boom

Tina Buford

Joe Crafton

Ray Ingle

Elaine Magruder

Adair Margo

Carolyn Miller

Greg Schildwachter, Ph.D.

== Leadership ==
In 2017 Joni Carswell was hired to lead Texan by Nature replacing interim director Matt Wagner.
