= USS Breton (CVE-23) =

US Navy escort carrier

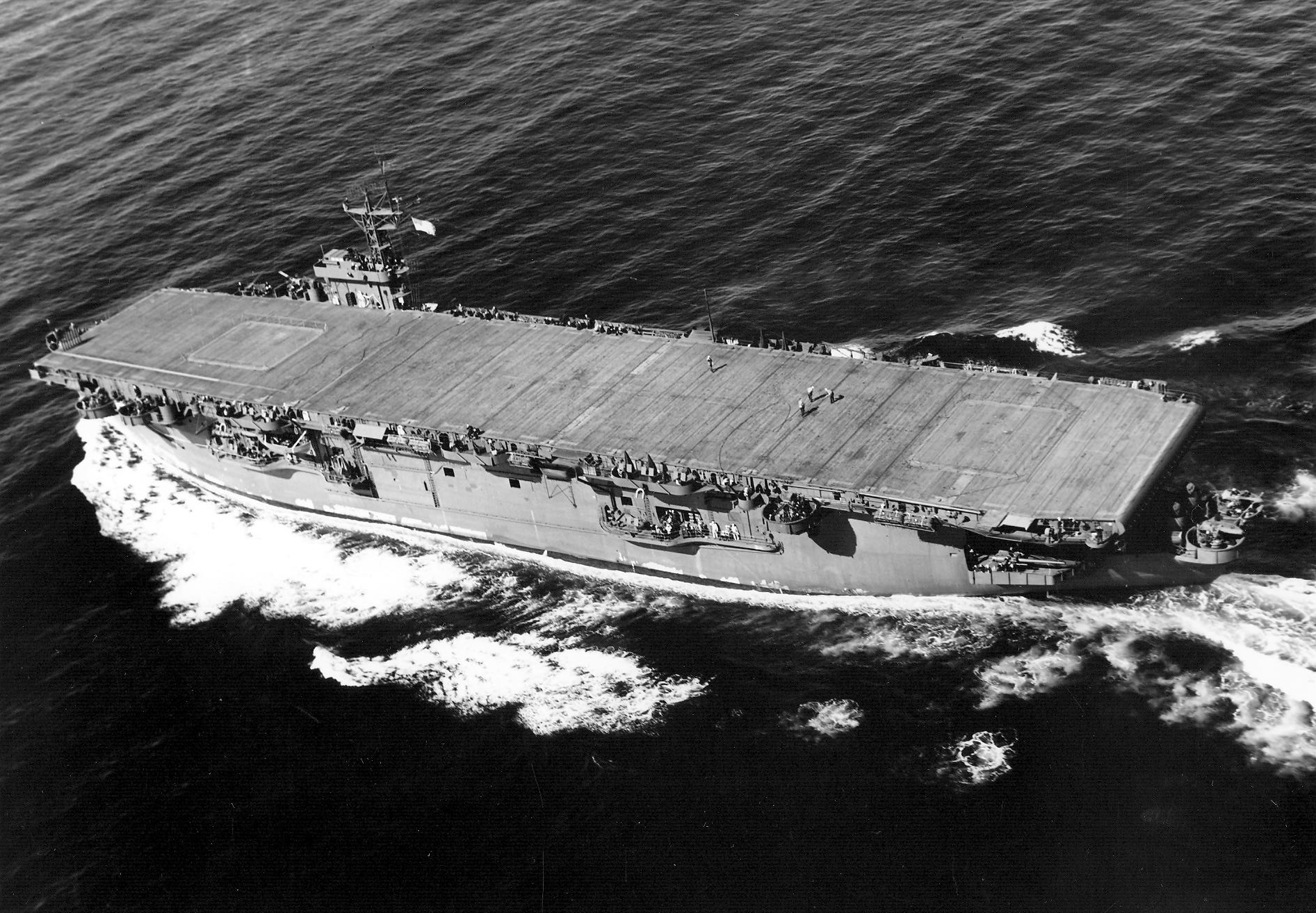
- USS Breton (CVE-23) underway in 1943

History

United States
- Name: Breton
- Namesake: Breton Sound, Louisiana
- Laid down: 25 February 1942
- Launched: 27 June 1942
- Commissioned: 12 April 1943
- Decommissioned: 20 August 1946
- Fate: Sold for scrap, 1972

General characteristics
- Class & type: Bogue-class escort carrier
- Displacement: 7,800 tons
- Length: 495.66 ft (151.08 m)
- Beam: 111.5 ft (34.0 m)
- Draft: 26 ft (7.9 m)
- Speed: 17.6 knots
- Complement: 1,205 officers and men
- Armament: 2 × 4"/50, 5"/38 or 5"/51 guns
- Aircraft carried: 24

USS Breton (CVE-23) (previously AVG-23 then ACV-23) was a Bogue-class escort carrier of the United States Navy. Breton was in service as an escort carrier from 1943 to 1946 and as an aircraft transport from 1958 to 1970.

Breton launched on 27 June 1942 by Seattle-Tacoma Shipbuilding of Tacoma, Washington under a Maritime Commission contract; sponsored by Mrs. A. H. Rooks, widow of Captain Albert Harold Rooks a posthumous Navy Medal of Honor recipient in World War II; and commissioned on 12 April 1943.

== Service history ==
Throughout her World War II service, Breton operated with the Carrier Transport Squadron, Pacific Fleet. Her sailings carried her throughout the Pacific supplying men, materiel, and aircraft to units of the fleet engaged in making strikes on the enemy. While engaged in these duties, Breton took part in the capture and occupation of Saipan (11 June–10 August 1944); the Battle of the Philippine Sea (19–20 June); the 2nd Bonins raid (24 June); and the assault and occupation of Okinawa (6–7 April 1945).

Upon her return to the west coast in January 1946 after serving as a unit of the Far Eastern occupation forces, Breton prepared for inactivation at Tacoma, and went out of commission in reserve there on 30 August 1946. She was reclassified CVHE-23 on 12 June 1955. On 1 July 1958, she was redesignated as a utility carrier, CVU-23, and then again on 7 May 1959 as an aviation transport, T-AKV-42. Breton was put out of service in 1971 and stricken for disposal on 6 August 1972, where she was subsequently sold for scrap.

== Awards ==
Breton received two battle stars for her World War II service.
