= American Campus Communities =

American real estate investment trust

American Campus Communities, Inc.

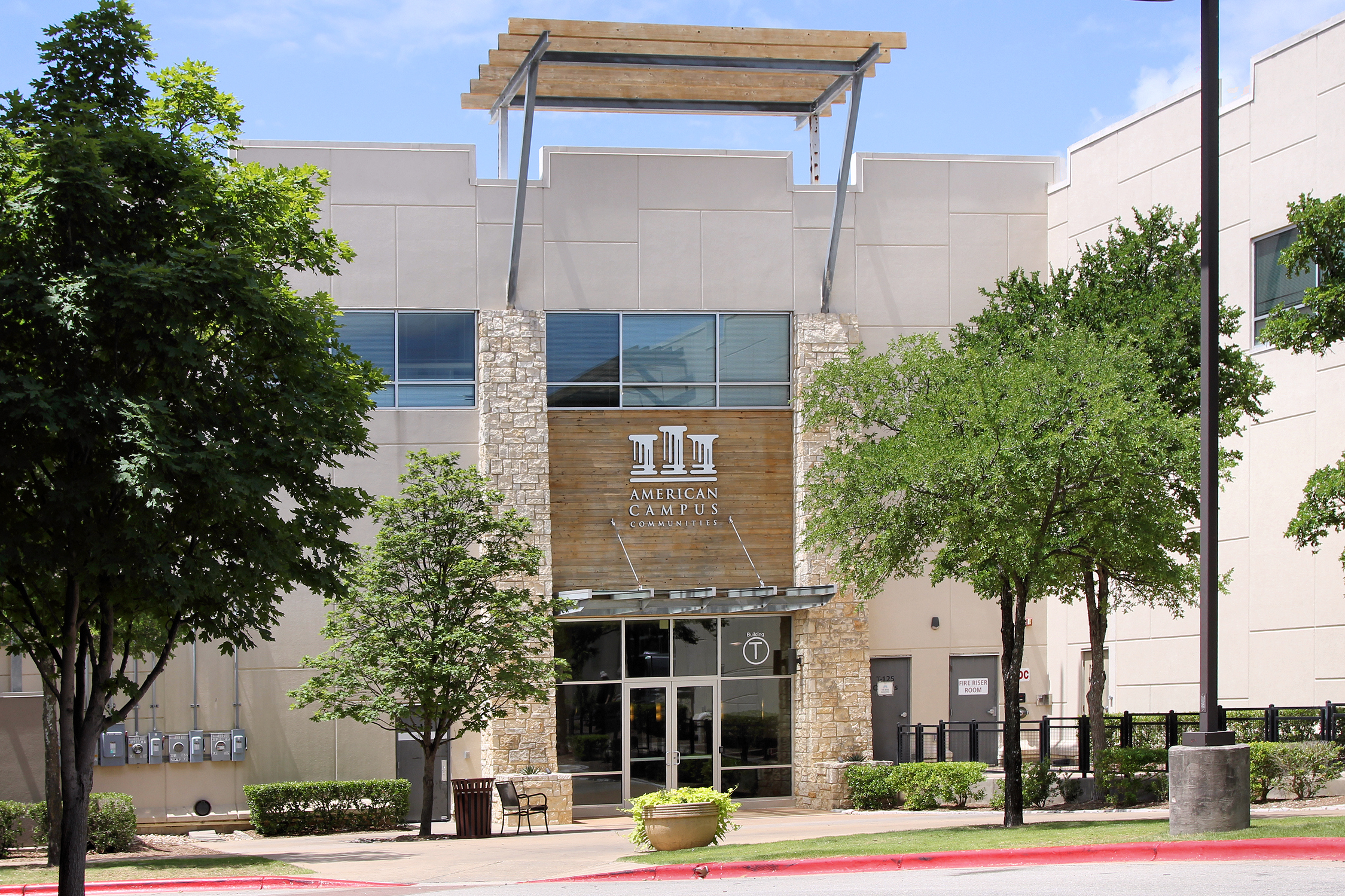
- The headquarters in Bee Cave, Texas
- Type: Subsidiary
- Industry: REIT
- Founded: 1993; 33 years ago
- Headquarters: Bee Cave, Texas, U.S.
- Key people: Rob Palleschi (CEO)
- Parent: Blackstone Inc.
- Website: americancampus.com

American Campus Communities, Inc. (ACC) is the largest developer, owner and manager of student housing communities in the United States. It is headquartered in Bee Cave, Texas, with an Austin postal address.

Co-founded in 1993 by CEO Bill Bayless, the company works with universities to develop, manage and finance on-campus and near-campus communities. As of March 31, 2021, the company owned 166 student housing properties with approximately 111,900 beds, including its owned and third-party managed properties. ACC's total managed portfolio consists of 207 properties with approximately 142,400 beds.

== History ==
From 1993 to 2003, the company partnered with SUNY system, the University of California System, and the Texas A&M University System to develop and manage student housing.

In 1996, Prairie View A&M University became the company's first university partner with the development of on campus, University Village. ACC developed housing for more than 2,000 students over the next two years.

In 1997, Bayless bought out his partners and in 1999, ACC developed its first off-campus residence, the Callaway House College Station at Texas A&M University for first‑year students.

In 2004, ACC became a public company via an initial public offering on the New York Stock Exchange, becoming the first publicly traded student housing company in the United States.

In 2005, the company worked with Arizona State University (ASU) on the Vista del Sol community, to pioneer the American Campus Equity program, an ownership model for on-campus student housing. With ACE, ACC brings equity to a project and serves as the university's financial, development and operating partner. In 2008, the company acquired the student housing division of GMH Communities Trust in a $1.4 billion transaction, doubling the size of the company.

In 2011, the company received $132 million contract to build a 1,008-bed student housing complex at Northern Illinois University. In 2013, ACC entered the Ivy League with Princeton's Merwick Stanworth faculty and staff housing community was its first project at an Ivy League university. It later expanded its partnership to develop and manage Princeton graduate student housing.

ASU's Manzanita Hall, became ACC's first redevelopment, reconfiguring the dilapidated 1960s high rise into a modern layout that aimed to promote academic performance, collaboration and community. In 2016, ACC broke ground on its 100th development, U Club Sunnyside at WVU, CEO Bill Bayless’ alma mater. In 2017, ASU opened the Tooker House, the largest engineering residential college. This marked the sixth phase of the ASU partnership and 33rd LEED certified building.

In 2018, ACC began construction on an approximately $615 million residential community for participants of the Disney College program, now known as Disney Internships & Programs, through an American Campus Equity translation. In 2019, American Campus Communities joined Northeastern University and the city of Boston to open the 20-story residential tower, LightView, as part of the “Housing A Changing City: Boston 2030” initiative to improve the quality and quantity of housing for students attending Boston institutions of higher education.

In 2020, ACC collaborated with Reckitt Benckiser, the makers of Lysol, to set a formalized approach to cleanliness and disinfection at its student housing communities in response to the COVID-19 pandemic.

On April 19, 2022, ACC announced that it was acquired by The Blackstone Group for $12.8 billion and would be going private (shareholders will be paid $65.47 cash per share). The acquisition was completed in August 2022.

== Major milestones ==
- First publicly traded campus dorm REIT
- CEO Bill Bayless was the Regional Winner of the Ernst and Young Entrepreneur of the Year award, and was subsequently named as a National Finalist (2007)
- National Association of Home Builders (2013) Development Firm of the Year
- Forbes “America's 100 Most Trustworthy” companies list (2012 & 2013)
- Texan by Nature 20 (TxN20) Honoree, an official ranking of the Top 20 Texas-based companies leading conservation and sustainability in 2019 and 2020

== Partnerships ==
American Campus Communities and the mental health non-profit, Hi, How Are You Project, aim to tackle issues of mental health among U.S. college students through a residence life training and awareness program at more than 70 universities across the country.

== Criticism ==
In December 2014, an incident occurred when University of Missouri student Jack Lipp fell from a balcony during a party due to a defective railing, resulting in his death. The property, owned by Ginger C, LLC, was slated for demolition by American Campus Communities to make room for a student housing complex. Subsequently, John and Stephanie Lipp, Jack's parents, filed a wrongful death lawsuit against multiple entities. After reaching a settlement, the Lipps secured a $5 million settlement with American Campus Communities, Ginger C, and Roland Management, approved by Judge Nanette K. Laughrey in April 2017.

In a settlement reached in 2018, U.S. District Judge John Ross resolved a federal class action lawsuit alleging deceptive marketing practices from American Campus Communities. Filed by Brian Fellows and other students, the suit alleged that ACC falsely advertised monthly lease rates based on 12 full months while signing 11-and-a-half-month leases. The company agreed to pay $444,775, with $275,000 allocated to a class benefit fund, providing approximately $322.77 to each of the 852 claimants. American Campus Communities changed its advertising practices following the lawsuit's filing, substituting "monthly" with "installment" payments. Eligible tenants who signed leases between November 1, 2012, and November 15, 2016, were invited to participate in the class action suit.

In February 2022, a civil lawsuit was filed against the West Virginia University Board of Governors and American Campus Communities, alleging negligence and wrongful death following the murder of student Eric J. Smith in February 2020. Smith was shot by two non-resident intruders, Terrell Linear and Shaundarius T. Reeder, who had gained unauthorized access to the building.

In early 2023, the University Area Commission in Columbus, Ohio, rejected a proposed 8-story student apartment complex on Lane Avenue and High Street, following public opposition. The project, pitched by American Campus Communities, aimed to construct an 88-foot building with 560 beds. Commissioners expressed concerns about the proposed building's height and its impact on the neighborhood's historical two-story storefronts, leading to a vote of 11-4 against the project. American Campus Communities indicated intentions to revise the proposal based on the feedback received.
