= America's Wetland Foundation =

US nonprofit organization

America's WETLAND Foundation
- Founded: 2003
- Type: 501(c)(3)
- Purpose: Coastal erosion, Wetland loss
- Location: New Orleans, Louisiana
- Method: Public education campaign
- Key people: R. King Milling, Chairman; Val Marmillion, Managing Director
- Volunteers: Over 1,000 in 2008 through America's WETLAND Conservation Corps
- Website: www.americaswetland.com

America's WETLAND Foundation (AWF) was a nonprofit, tax exempt 501(c)(3) organization with the stated mission to save and conserve coastal wetlands in the U.S. state of Louisiana. The organization aimed to achieve this mission through a public awareness campaign on the impact Louisiana's wetland loss has on the state, region, nation and world.

AWF was based in New Orleans, Louisiana. The public education campaign started in 2002, when the AWF board hired the public relations Marmillion + Company.

Since its formation in 2003, AWF officials said its message and outreach has resulted in more than 1 billion media impressions worldwide. That tally includes documentaries, news shows, feature stories, billboards, festivals, special events, public-service announcements and Web sites.

AWF shut down in 2020 due to a lack of funding.

== History ==
In 2001, Former Louisiana Governor Mike Foster launched what would become the America's WETLAND Campaign, and declared a "holy war" on coastal erosion. Since a previous 18 month state sponsored study had determined a comprehensive restoration effort would cost more than $14 billion, it was determined the only way to raise that amount of money was through federal funding and therefore widespread public support was necessary.

In 2003, AWF became an independent foundation supported by public donations, and private sponsors such as Shell Oil Company, Tabasco pepper sauce, and others.

AWF was supported by Republicans and Democrats including Foster's successor, Former Louisiana Governor Kathleen Blanco, who joined the effort in 2004. AWF grew into a multimillion-dollar campaign, and describes itself as "the largest public education campaign in Louisiana history."

=== Hurricanes Katrina and Rita ===
Hurricanes Katrina and Rita were predated by AWF's first "Storm Warnings" event, which sought to illustrate the role wetlands play as a natural hurricane buffer. The event ominously involved draping a blue tarp over a block of Royal Street to illustrate the flood levels if a Category 5 storm hit New Orleans. As a result, the America's WETLAND Foundation was a natural platform for Louisiana public officials to rally national public support to the region. Former Congressman Billy Tauzin stated in an article in The Washington Post following the disasters, "We all came together around America's Wetland... [it] was the most coordination I ever saw."

In addition, then Governor Blanco asked AWF to provide support and assistance in establishing the Louisiana Disaster Recovery Foundation to receive donations to assist Louisiana victims of the hurricanes. An AWF related organization, "Women of the Storm" (WOS), was created following the storms. The WOS is composed of 140 New Orleans area volunteers who advocate for members of the United States Congress to visit hurricane-damaged areas. As of January 2009, their efforts have resulted in 57 Senators and 147 Representatives witnessing damaged areas first hand. One year after the hurricanes AWF launched "Riding the Trail to Recovery" a two-mile (3 km) cattle drive through lower Cameron Parish designed to help bring attention to victims of Hurricane Rita who may have felt forgotten by the larger focus on Hurricane Katrina.

== Objectives and messages ==
The America's WETLAND Foundation's public awareness campaign focused on two themes: one, the region is of world ecological significance and, two, it is critical to the economic and energy future of the United States. The Foundation supports the Coastal Protection and Restoration Authority's master plan for coastal restoration passed by the Louisiana Legislature in 2007.

AWF's Progress Report states its public education campaign has five primary objectives:

1. Design a powerful, consistent and effective identity and brand along with images and core messages to define the problem and the impact of the loss of Louisiana's wetlands.
2. Create outreach opportunities and utilize comprehensive print and media strategies to increase news coverage, educate the public and engender campaign support.
3. Develop a strong and active "Cooperating Organizations" network to support dissemination of campaign messages and information to key audiences.
4. Build an education infrastructure through opportunities to engage youth and adults about coastal Louisiana issues.
5. Develop funding opportunities to support the campaign and long-term restoration activities.

== Awareness events ==
The America's WETLAND Foundation included a variety of organizations, brands, and awareness events. Some of their annual awareness events included "Storm Warnings", and "Keep Your Eye on The Prize". The annual Storm Warnings event occurs around the start of each hurricane season (end of May) and is designed to help focus national attention on the importance of Louisiana's coast and the wetlands' role as a natural hurricane buffer.

"Storm Warnings IV: Last Stand for America's Wetland" took place May 30–31, 2009, and included a large free concert in New Orleans. This will be followed the next day by flotillas of watercraft rendezvousing at the Houma Downtown Marina where they will point reflectors to the sun, to be photographed by satellite to illustrate how the land below the line will be lost if nothing is done to restore Louisiana's eroding coast.

"Keep Your Eye On The Prize" is a two-month-long photo, art and poetry contest for Louisiana students in fourth through twelfth grade. The contest usually asks students to capture the importance or beauty of the wetlands through one of the above mediums. The nine first-place winners (three age divisions for each category) receive a $500 grant for their school to conduct a conservation project, usually in conjunction with the America's WETLAND Conservation Corps.

The "Estuarians" are an animated superhero conservation action team designed to help kids learn about the importance of the wetlands. They are also mascots who have been to multiple events including Mardi Gras, National Wetlands Research Center, and Ocean Commotion .

The America's WETLAND Foundation helped sponsor and develop a comprehensive series of birding trails throughout the state of Louisiana in conjunction with Lieutenant Governor Mitch Landrieu. America's Wetland Birding Trail now consists of 264 sites on 26 loops and 10 scenic pathways statewide. Many of these sites are located in rural settings near rivers, deltas, open meadows, lagoons and in several pine and hardwood forests. The paths follow interstate, state and federal highways around the state as individual loops stand together as one tourist attraction within the transportation network of Louisiana.

AWF also produced brochures, public service announcements, and documentaries.

== Related organizations ==
AWF sponsored educational and restoration programs, such as the America's WETLAND Conservation Corps, which was a partnership between the America's WETLAND Foundation and the Louisiana State University AgCenter. This AmeriCorps program, operating in conjunction with LSU AgCenter, placed members at sites throughout Louisiana to coordinate hands-on coastal restoration projects that include vegetative plantings, restorative interventions, community wide cleanups, and hands-on education projects for volunteers and communities in an effort to promote stewardship and conservation, raising public awareness of the negative impact that the erosion of Louisiana's wetlands has on the state, national and worldwide ecosystems.

An AWF-related organization, "Women of the Storm", (WOS), was created following Hurricanes Katrina and Rita. The WOS is composed of 140 New Orleans area volunteers who advocate for members of Congress to visit hurricane-damaged areas. As of January 2009, their efforts have led 57 Senators and 147 Representatives to witness damaged areas firsthand. AWF advocated for and supported the science-backed Mid-Barataria and Mid-Breton Sediment Diversion projects, that were cancelled by Governor Jeff Landry in 2025. WOS is demanding answers.

America's Energy Coast is an AWF-related organization that joins the Gulf Coast energy producing states of Louisiana, Mississippi, Alabama, and Texas together to develop common solutions to ensure a sustainable coastal environment and the inextricably linked activities critical to the nation's energy and economic security. Its "Accord for a New Sustainability For America's Energy Coast" is a living framework of shared principles where its disparate member groups have come to consensus. The group claims its format "will yield technology and solutions best practices, and policy recommendations at all levels of government."

== See also ==
- Wetlands of the United States
- Louisiana Coastal Protection and Restoration Authority
