= Terrebonne Basin =

Coordinates: 29.7°N 91.0°W

Terrebonne Basin is an abandoned delta complex, in Terrebonne Parish, Louisiana. The area is identified by thick sections of unconsolidated sediments that are undergoing dewatering and compaction which contributes to high subsidence. There is a network of old distributary ridges, associated with past distributaries of the Mississippi River, extending south from Houma, Louisiana into the Gulf of Mexico.

"Terre bonne" means "rich earth", and was named by the French. The fertile lands are used predominantly for agriculture, with sugarcane and pastures on the ridges, and forested wetlands in the lower elevations, leading to freshwater and saltwater marshes in the coastal areas, before opening up to Terrebonne and Timbalier Bays.

The Terrebonne Basin extends from Pointe Coupee Parish, Louisiana to Terrebonne Bay, covering approximately 1,712,500 acres (693,000 ha) including around 728,700 acres (294,900 ha) of wetlands. An estimated 96% of the wetlands in the Basin are privately owned.

== Waters of the Terrebonne Basin ==
The Terrebonne Basin consists of four adjoining bodies of water, Caillou Bay, Lake Pelto, Terrebonne Bay, and Timbalier Bay. The Terrebonne Basin has four sub-basins, the Verret and Penchant sub-basins, Fields sub-basin, and the Timbalier sub-basin. The Terrebonne Basin supports around 155,000 acres (63,000 ha) of swamp and almost 574,000 acres (232,000 ha) of marsh, ranging from fresh marsh inland to brackish and saline marsh near the bays and the gulf.

At the southern end of Terrebonne Basin are some narrow and low-lying barrier islands, the Isles Dernieres (Wine, Trinity/East, Whiskey, and Raccoon islands now make up the Isles Dernieres Barrier Island Refuge) and the Timbalier chains, among 26 islands in various stages of erosion or submersion. These islands are separated from the mainland marshes by a series of wide, shallow lakes and bays. These include Lake Pelto, Terrebonne Bay, Timbalier Bay, Lake Jean Pierre, Lake La Graisse, Lake Saint Jean Baptiste, Bay Negresse, Bay la Fleur, Bay Chaland, Tambour Bay, Troiscent Piquets Bay, Bayou Petit Cailou, Bay Sainte Elaine, Bay Blanc, Cailou Bay, Cailou Lake, Lost Lake, Lake De Cade, Lake Barre, Lake Felicity, Old Lady Lake, Deep Lake, Little Lake, Coal Tar Bay, Lake Raccourci, Jacko Camp Bay, Landry Bay, Pearl Bayou, Poudreaux Canal Bridge, Lake Gero, Lake Boudreaux, Lost Lake, Jug Lake, Lake Quitman, Lake Pagie, Fourleague Bay, Lake Chapeau, Felix Lake, Deep Saline, Bay Pumpkin, Bay Couteau, Bay Long, Bay Charlie, Dog Lake, Bay Cocodrie, Bay Voisi, Pass la poule, East Bayou, Oyster Bayou, King Lake, Lake Mechant, Mud Lake, Bay Castagnier, Mangrove Bay, Bay de Mongles, Devils Bay, and Catfish Lake.

== Lost land ==
Land in the basin is being lost at an alarming rate. Isle de Jean Charles, home of the state-recognized tribe of the Isle de Jean Charles Band of Biloxi-Chitimacha-Choctaw Indians, was once 22,000 acres (8,900 ha) but has lost 98% of its land (down to 320 acres) to subsidence, saltwater intrusion natural disasters, climate change and oil/gas exploration. In 2016 the state received funding for the tribe's resettlement 40 miles inland. The area will be called New Isle, located on Bayou Blue Bypass Road in Gray, 40 miles northwest of present Isle de Jean Charles.

What is causing the land loss? Subsidence, marsh sediments compacting and sinking under their own weight, a loss of freshwater sediment brought about by levees that were constructed to protect communities from floods, that, in turn, prevent water and sediment from reaching the marshes so they are drowning. Chemical changes in the soil kill marsh vegetation and it is broken up by wave action converting the marsh to open water.

The loss of land is staggering. The Terrebonne Basin has lost approximately 20% of its wetlands since 1932, averaging from 4,500 acres (1,800 ha) to 6,500 acres (2,600 ha) a year. Over the next 20 years, Terrebonne Basin could lose 130,000 acres (53,000 ha). By 2040 a third of Terrebonne Basin's remaining wetlands would be lost to open water and the existing shoreline could retreat 10 miles (16 km) inland and possibly up to 30 miles (48 km).

=== Lost cause ===
In 1907 Theodore Roosevelt, an avid birder saw the importance of protecting East Timbalier Island as a bird sanctuary. President Roosevelt signed executive orders designating Breton Island, Tern, and Shell Keys — federally protected bird sanctuaries. The designation should have also offered protection from oil drilling but there are over 160 wellheads around what is left of the island. East Timbalier Island, as a coastal barrier and first line of defense against hurricanes and storm surges, is important. Over $27 million has been spent and in 2020 the Coastal Protection and Restoration Authority decided it was too far gone. The island, 40 miles south of Houma, has had a rock barrier installed on the ocean side that is now underwater and then a second barrier. This has not stopped erosion or the island from being cut in two. The wellheads and pipelines are but one serious issue that seems impossible to solve. There was once 18,000 acres (7,300 ha) of islands in the Terrebonne Basin now only around 7,000 acres (2,800 ha) stay above the mean high tide. There are over 700 wellheads around Terrebonne and Timbalier bays that were not designed or built to withstand the loss of the barrier island. The money just was not there to stop the 70 feet per year erosion in recent decades. The attempts to shore up the island have been unsuccessful so in a short time there will likely be no more East Timbalier Island.

== Barataria-Terrebonne Estuary System ==
The Barataria-Terrebonne Estuary System (BTES) is an ecosystem of 4.1 million acres covering sixteen parishes in Louisiana. The Parishes include Ascension Parish, Assumption Parish, Iberville Parish, Jefferson Parish, Lafourche Parish, Plaquemines Parish, Pointe Coupee Parish, St. Charles Parish, St. James Parish St. John the Baptist Parish, St. Mary Parish, Terrebonne Parish, West Baton Rouge Parish and some of Iberia Parish, St. Martin Parish, and Orleans Parish.

=== Barataria-Terrebonne National Estuary Program ===
Congress passed section 320 of the Clean Water Act in 1987. The Barataria-Terrebonne estuarine complex became a National Estuary, joining 27 other National Estuary Programs throughout the United States and its territories in 1990. The estuary is located between the Mississippi and Atchafalaya rivers in south Louisiana. Bayou Lafourche separates this complex into two basins, Barataria Basin to the east and Terrebonne Basin to the west.

The U.S. Environmental Protection Agency and the State of Louisiana joined in a cooperative agreement under the National Estuary Program to form the Barataria-Terrebonne National Estuary Program (BTNEP) and in 1992 created the Comprehensive Conservation & Management Plan that is now working on 2019
