= Chemistry of wetland dredging =

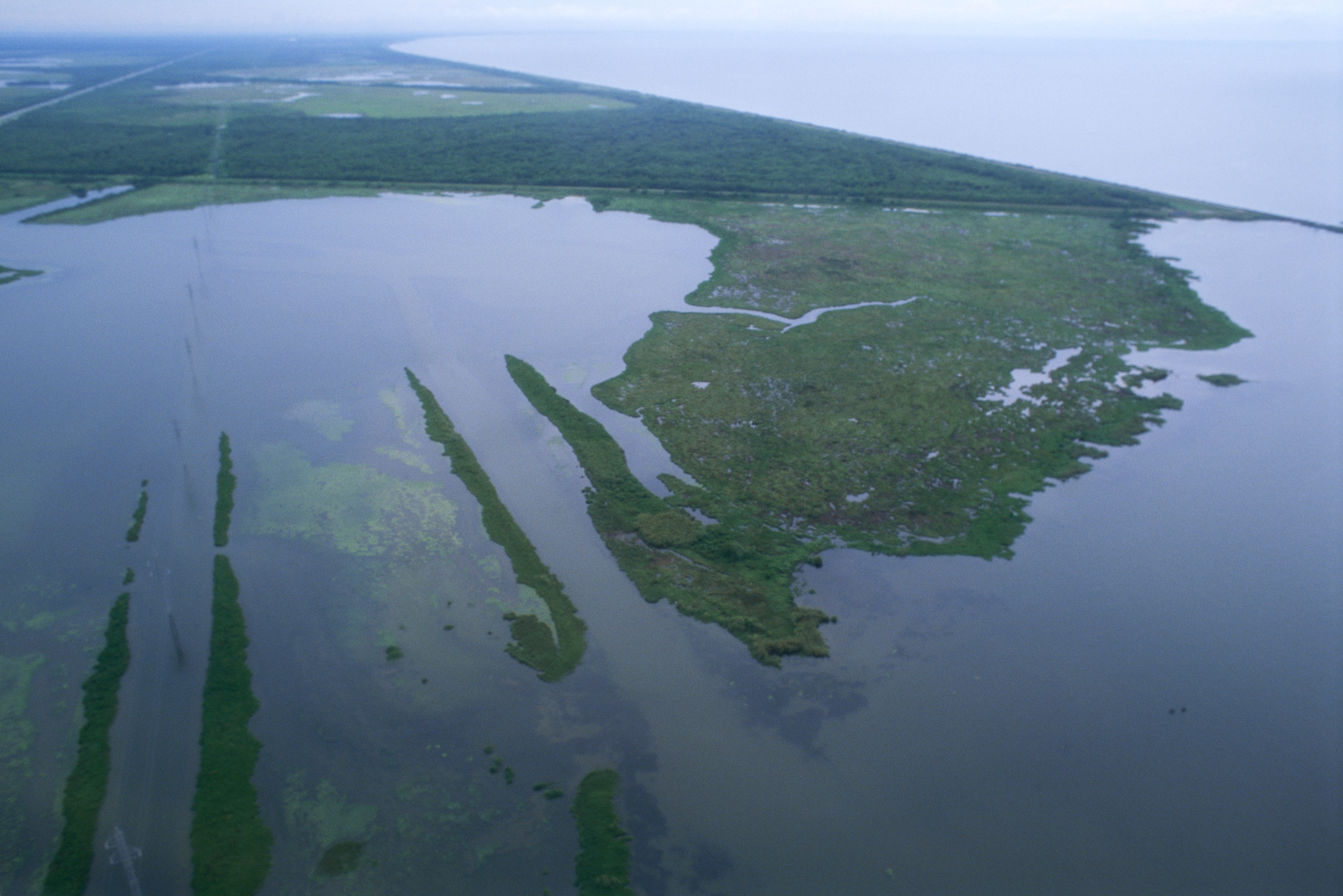
Overhead view of Louisiana wetlands

Wetland chemistry is largely affected by dredging, which can be done for a variety of purposes. Wetlands are areas within floodplains with both terrestrial and aquatic characteristics, including marshes, swamps, bogs, and others. It has been estimated that they occupy around 2.8 million km^{2}, about 2.2% of the Earth’s surface, but other estimates are even higher. It has also been estimated to have a worth of $14.9 trillion and are responsible for 75% of commercial and 90% of recreational harvest of fish and shellfish in the United States. Wetlands also hold an important role in water purification, storm protection, industry, travel, research, education, and tourism. Being heavily used and traveled through, dredging is common and leads to continuation of long-term damage of the ecosystem and land loss, and ultimately a loss in industry, homes, and protection.

Wetlands undergo different chemical reactions depending on a variety of parameters, including salinity and pH. Redox reactions have a major effect on wetland ecosystems, as they depend heavily on salinity, pH, oxygen availability, and others. Common redox reactions in wetland include carbon, nitrogen, and sulfur transformations. Fluctuations in water flow and flooding can change the abundance of the oxidized or reduced species depending on the environment. Increased flooding and water flow can also change the availability of nutrients to local species. The further the wetlands change from their original states, the more difficult rebuilding land becomes. The types of mitigation efforts also change depending on the chemistry, so an understanding of the change is required for effective mitigation.

== Wetlands ==
=== Definition ===
Wetlands are areas of land submerged in water near both terrestrial and aquatic systems. They are highly diverse and are classified by the United States Fish and Wildlife Service into five categories: "The term wetland includes a variety of areas that fall into one of five categories: (1) areas with hydrophytes and hydric soils, such as those commonly known as marshes, swamps, and bogs; (2) areas without hydrophytes but with hydric soils - for example, flats where drastic fluctuation in water level, wave action, turbidity, or high concentration of salts may prevent the growth of hydrophytes; (3) areas with hydrophytes but nonhydric soils, such as margins of impoundments or excavations where hydrophytes have become established but hydric soils have not yet developed; (4) areas without soils but with hydrophytes such as the seaweed-covered portion of rocky shores; and (5) wetlands without soil and without hydrophytes, such as gravel beaches or rocky shores without vegetation".

Wetlands can also be classified based on salinity, a type of classification often referenced in research where salinity is a major factor. These classifications are often referred to in parts per thousand (ppt) and include freshwater (0–2 ppt), intermediate (2–10 ppt), brackish (10–20 ppt), and saltwater (20+ ppt).

=== Importance of wetlands ===
Wetlands are sources of extreme biodiversity and ecological benefit. They contain a multitude of species of plants and animals, including 79 species classified as rare, threatened, or endangered. An estimate by the U.S. Fish and Wildlife Service indicates that wetlands provide for, directly and indirectly, up to 43% of federally threatened or endangered species. Wetlands are the leading producer of oysters, 50% of the shrimp crop, 75% of the alligator harvest, 27% of the oil and gas, and the largest port complex in the United States. The world’s wetlands have an estimated worth of $14.9 trillion.

Wetlands also provide for disaster protection, including surge protection from hurricanes, as they and barrier islands help to break down the power of a storm before it reaches mainland. They also provide flood relief, as they are able to hold about three-acre feet (one million gallons) of water. This holding of water allows for rejuvenation of ecosystems, as new sediment is able to settle. Flooding also affects factors such as root penetration, soil temperature, conductivity, and bulk density.

Wetlands are highly effective at removing pollutants and excess nutrients due to the slow water flow and absorption by the plant systems. This has been shown to be effective in the removal of nitrogen and phosphorus, the major nutrients involved in "dead zones". They are also major sinks for heavy metals and sulfur.

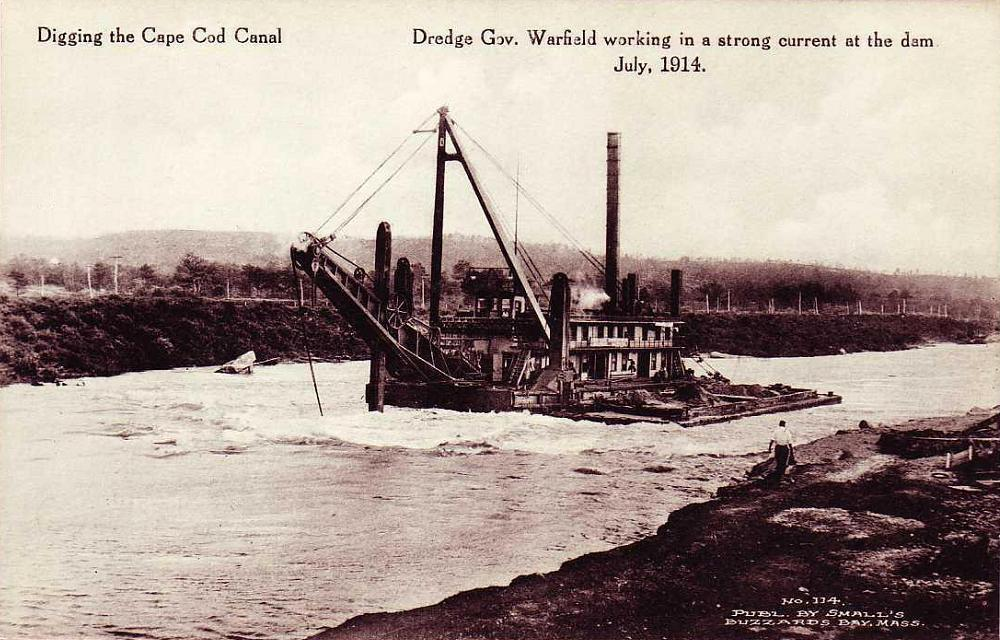
An example of a canal being dredged

=== Dredging ===
Dredging is the removal of sediment, plant species, and debris from an aquatic area. Industry, travel, and recreation throughout wetlands often requires the dredging of canals, especially by oil industry to get out to their offshore drills through coastal wetlands. Canals widen after being dredged because of the increased water flow and loss of plant life, both attributing to increased erosion. It is estimated that there are 4,572 miles (7,358 km) of canals south of the Intracoastal Waterway, not including Lake Pontchartrain and Lake Maurepas, and that canals alone attribute to 6.53 square miles (16.9 km^{2}) of land loss per year in the United States. The permits required to dredge these canals include stipulations of refilling, but these are not often enforced. John M. Barry, along with a group of private lawyers and coastal experts, filed a lawsuit in 2013 against 97 corporations who had violated their permits in Louisiana’s coastal wetlands in response to this. It is referred to as "the most ambitious environmental lawsuit ever" by the New York Times and has been met with political resistance.

== Wetland dredging chemistry ==
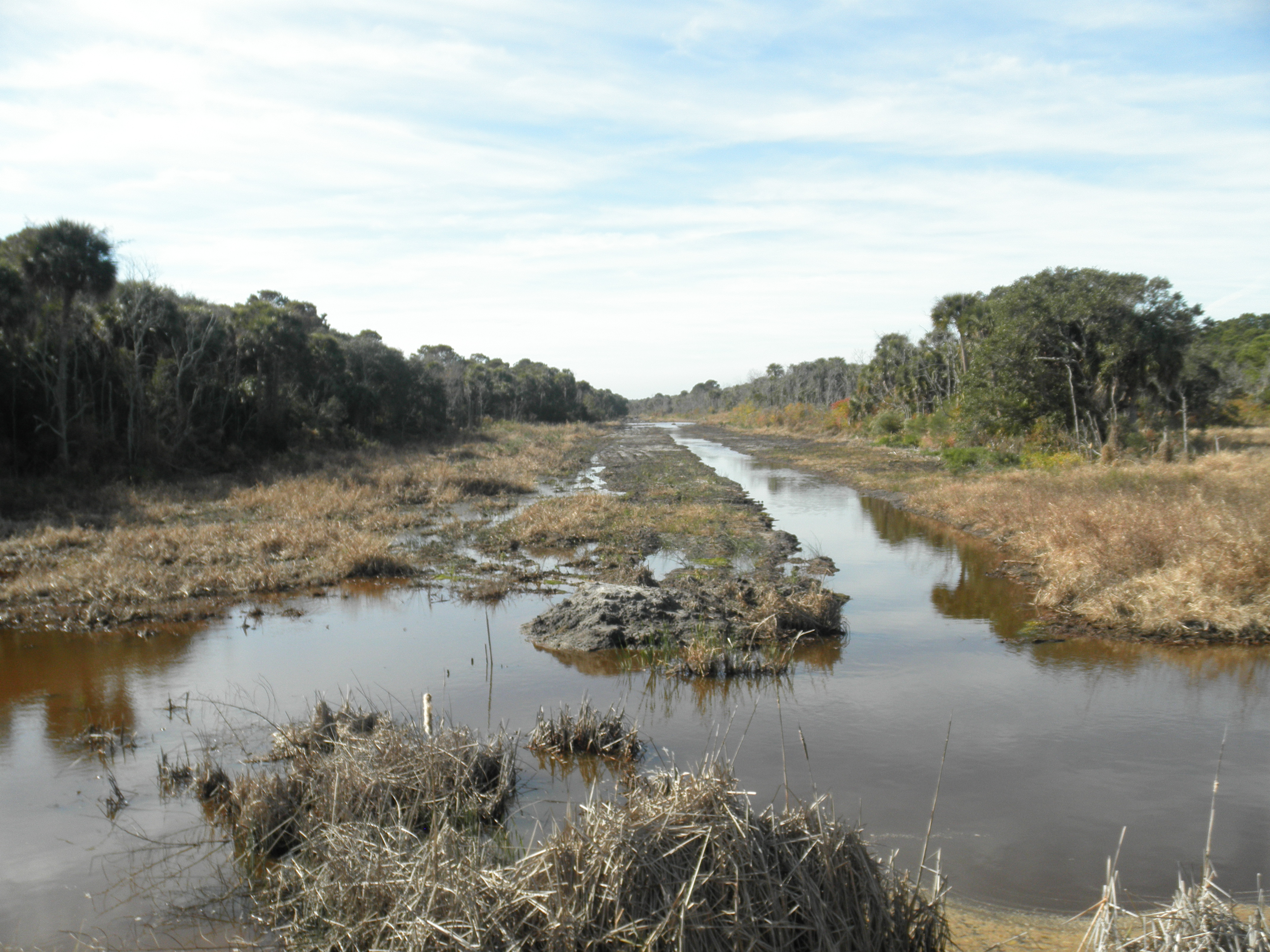
Canal dredged in a wetland area

Wetlands are dynamic systems that undergo a variety of chemical reactions depending greatly on the specific physicochemical properties of the area, such as temperature, pressure, dissolved organic matter, pH, salinity, and dissolved gases (CO_{2} and O_{2}). The qualities that have the largest effect are salinity and pH. An increase in flooding (a result of dredging) increases the salinity of wetlands, as it allows saltwater to intrude, neutralizes the pH, and provides more anaerobic soil conditions. The conditions then effect the nutrient availability and redox reactions.

=== Redox reactions ===
Redox reactions are highly influential in wetland soil chemistry through transformations including those of carbon, sulfur, nitrogen. The abundance of oxygen changes the abundance of oxidized or reduced states of each compound. Areas of higher oxygen availability (aerobic) tend towards oxidized states and areas of low oxygen availability (anaerobic) tend towards reduced states. The abundance of each type results in a different ecosystem, as the plants and animals of the wetlands require specific conditions for their growth. Common wetland redox reactions include:

2NO_{3}^{−} +10e^{−} +12H^{+} → N_{2} +6H_{2}O
SO_{4} +8e^{−} +9H^{+} → HS^{−} +4H_{2}O
CO_{2} +8e^{−} +8H^{+} → CH_{4} + 2H_{2}O
MnO_{2} +2e^{−} +4H^{+} → Mn^{2+} + 2H_{2}O
Fe(OH)_{3} +e^{−} +3H^{+} → Fe^{3+} + 3H_{2}O

Dredging allows for an increased flow of water through wetlands, causing anaerobic soil conditions. This change in wetland type results in a change in redox state for each reaction undergone and thus changes the plant species available to grow in those areas. The redox potential (Eh) can help to show the relationship of the redox reactions through the Nernst equation:

Eh=E^{0}-(RT/nF)ln([Reductants]^{a}/[Oxidants]^{b}[H^{+}]^{b})

This equation allows for the calculation of the extent of reaction between two redox systems and can be used, for example, to decide whether a particular reaction will go to completion or not.

An example of a change in these circumstances affecting the wetland system is in the transformation of pyrite (FeS_{2}) through the reduction of SO_{4}^{2−} (found in seawater).

Fe(OH)_{3} + e^{−} + H^{+} → Fe(OH)_{2} + H_{2}O
SO_{4}^{2−} + 6e^{−} + 8H^{+} → S + 4H_{2}O
S + 2e^{−} + 2H^{+} → H_{2}S
Fe(OH)_{2} + H_{2}S → FeS + 2H_{2}O
FeS + S → FeS_{2} (pyrite)

The drainage of the resulted pyrite then results in oxidation to ferric hydroxide and sulfuric acid, causing extreme acidity (pH < 2).

=== Nutrient availability ===
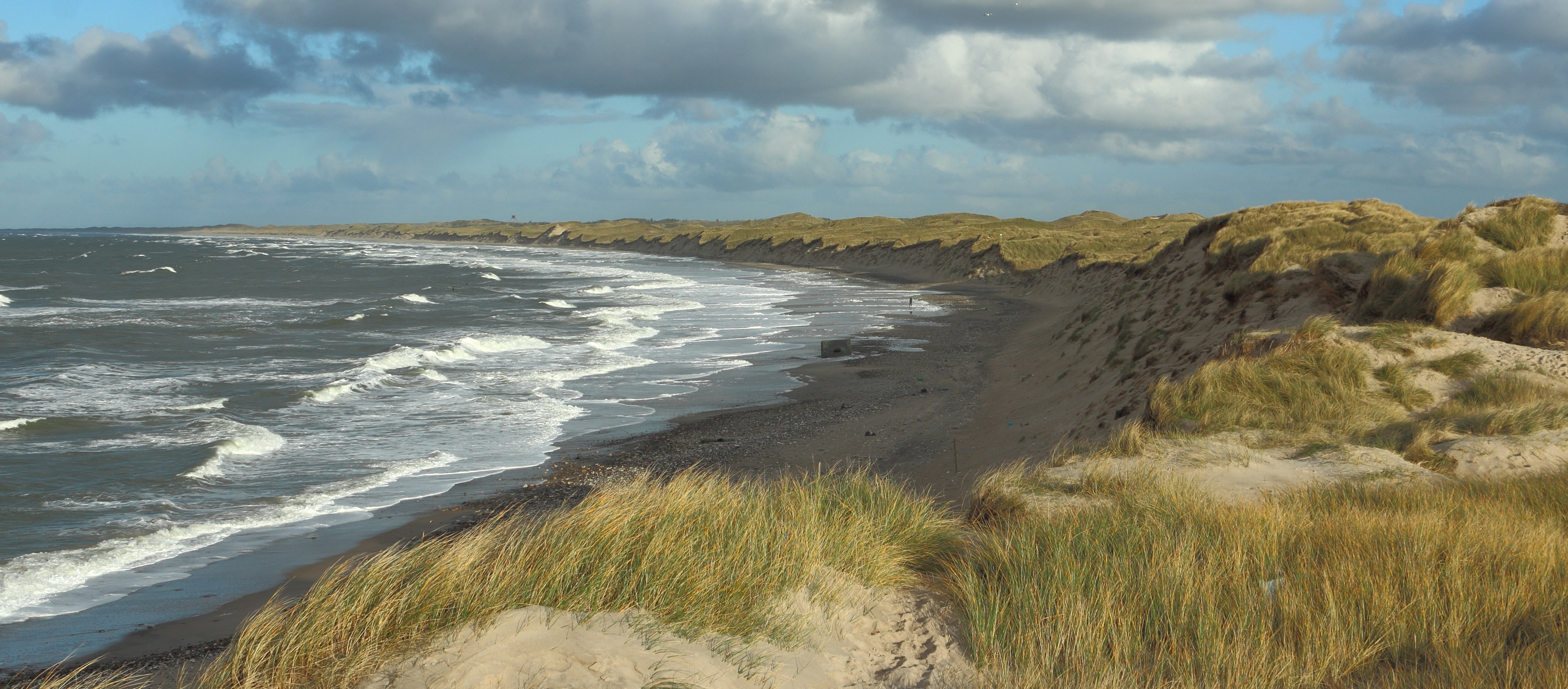
Coastal land

Increased flooding also allows for saltwater intrusion, changing the salinity levels and killing off species of plants that normally grew and changing available nutrient, chemical, and oxygen levels as well. An increase in salinity leads to higher sulfate concentrations and higher sulfide emissions, and higher toxicity. It also results in a reduction of sulfur availability to plant species as it precipitates with trace metals such as zinc and copper. An example of this is ferrous sulfide (FeS), which gives wetland soils their black color and is the source of sulfur commonly found in coal deposits.

Flooding also results in pH neutralization of generally acidic (with exceptions) wetlands. Acidic wetlands inhibit denitrification, thus flooding allows denitrification to occur, resulting in a loss of gaseous nitrogen forms to the atmosphere. The reaction is shown below:

5C_{6}H_{12}O_{6} +24NO_{3}^{−} +24H^{+} → 30CO_{2} +12N_{2} +42H_{2}O

Anaerobic soil conditions brought on by flooding allows for precipitation of phosphates with ferric iron and aluminum (acidic soils) or calcium and magnesium (basic soils) resulting in phosphorus being unavailable for uptake in plant species.

== Importance of wetland chemistry ==
As the environment is altered through physical means (dredging), the occurring reactions change resulting in a decrease of the availability of nutrients and chemical species to plant species and the ecosystem. This then further changes the physical environment as these species are no longer able to survive. The loss of species then results in further changes to the chemical environment, as they are no longer present to remove excess nutrients. This also changes the physical environment further as the lack of survival of plant species results in open land and increased erosion. The change of the chemical environment also affects the mitigation techniques to be applied for rebuilding of wetlands as the survival of plant species that could potentially be planted depends on the chemical environment, and changes must be monitored for effective mitigation to take place.
