= Mahanadi River Delta =

Coordinates: 20.440685°N 85.928511°E

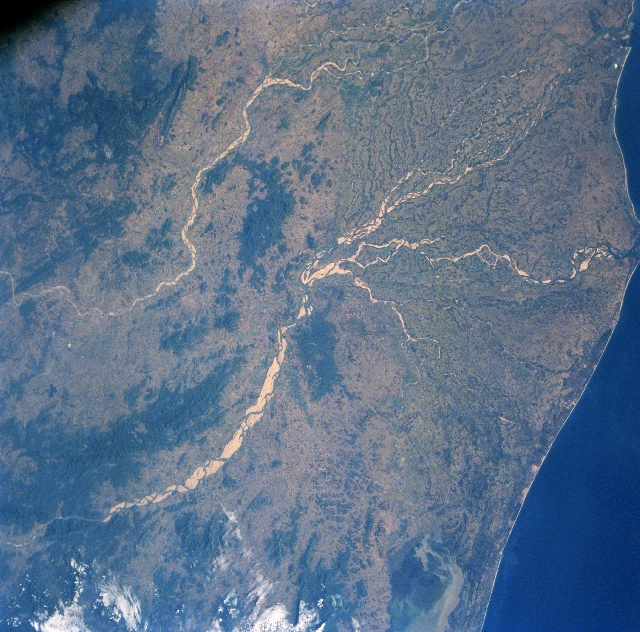
Mahanadi River Delta - NASA satellite view

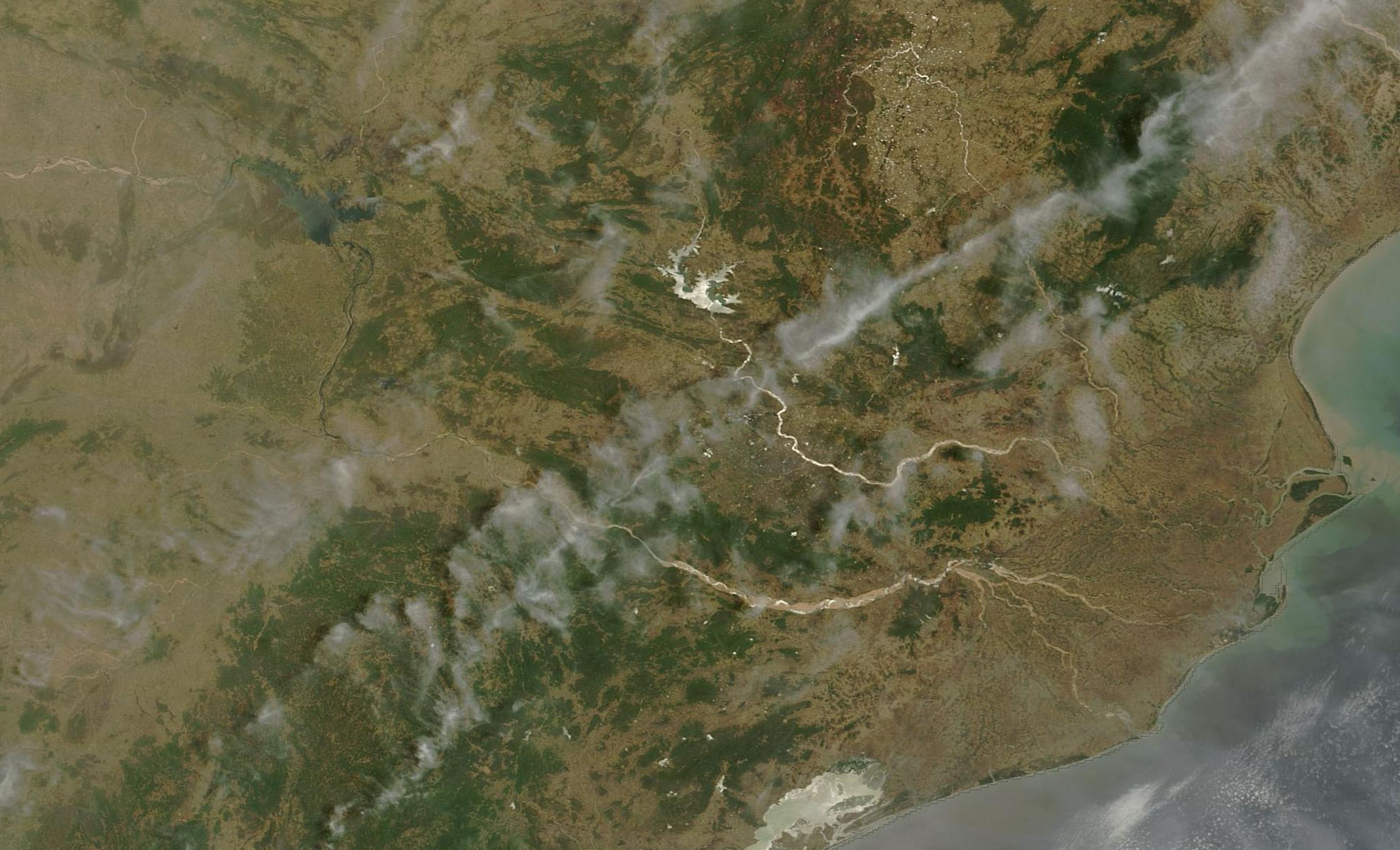
Mahanadi delta with nearby reservoirs

Mahanadi River Delta in India is a basin of deposit that drains a large land mass of the Indian subcontinent into the Bay of Bengal. The alluvial valley is wide and relatively flat with a meandering river channel that changes its course.

The Mahanadi River flows slowly for 900 kilometres (560 mi) and has an estimated drainage area of 132,100 square kilometres (51,000 sq mi). It deposits more silt than almost any other river in the Indian subcontinent.

The area of the drainage basin is 141,464 km^{2}. The interior coastal plain has relatively low elevation. The average elevation of the drainage basin is 426 m, with a maximum of 877 m and a minimum of 193 m.

== Population density ==
The upper part of the delta plain is heavily populated, with the population density exceeding 36 people per square kilometre. The population density falls moving toward the coast.

The climate in the area is primarily sub-tropical. Rainfall comes predominantly from the summer monsoon (June through September). The average annual rainfall in the basin is 1,463 mm. Rainfall is extremely low during the rest of the year, rarely exceeding 30 mm per month.
