= Louisiana Coastal Protection and Restoration Authority =

Governmental authority by the Louisiana State Legislature

Coastal Protection and Restoration Authority of Louisiana

Agency overview
- Formed: 2005
- Jurisdiction: Louisiana Coastal Zone
- Headquarters: Baton Rouge, Louisiana
- Annual budget: $1.7 b USD (2025)
- Agency executives: Glenn Ledet Jr., Executive Director; Bren Haase, Deputy Executive Director
- Parent department: Office of the Governor of Louisiana
- Website: https://coastal.la.gov/

The Louisiana Coastal Protection and Restoration Authority (CPRA) is a governmental authority created by the Louisiana State Legislature in the aftermath of Hurricanes Katrina and Rita to combat the ongoing erosion of Louisiana's coast. The CPRA reports to the Office of the Governor of Louisiana. The organization takes advantage of both federal and state funding of around $1 billion annually.

Since its founding, the organization has completed over 140 projects, benefitting 55,807 acres (87.198 sq mi) of land, placing 193 million cubic yards of sediment, improving 369 miles (594 km) of levees, and restoring 71.6 miles (115.2 km) of barrier islands. CPRA predicts that, without action over the next 50 years, between 1,100 and 3,000 square miles (2,800 and 7,800 km^{2}) of coastal land may be lost, depending on a low (1.6 feet (0.49 m)) or high (2.5 feet (0.76 m)) forecast of local sea level rise.

== History ==
The creation of CPRA was ordered by U.S. Congress in Pub. L. 109–148 (text) (PDF). The CPRA's forerunner, the Wetlands Conservation and Restoration Authority, was restructured as the CPRA by Act 8 of the First Extraordinary Session of 2005 when the tasks of coastal restoration and hurricane protection were consolidated under a single authority. The authority is responsible for overseeing all levee districts in the Louisiana Coastal Zone and dispersal of funding from Louisiana's Coastal Protection and Restoration Trust Fund to be used exclusively for wetland restoration and hurricane protection projects. Act 8 defines the CPRA's mandate as, "hurricane protection and the protection, conservation, restoration, and enhancement of coastal wetlands and barrier shorelines or reefs." Additionally, the act defined the term "coastal area" as the Louisiana Coastal Zone and contiguous areas that are subject to storm or tidal surge.

In April 2007, the CPRA submitted Louisiana's first ever Comprehensive Master Plan for coastal restoration and hurricane protection to the state's legislature for approval. The legislature approved the plan unanimously. Entitled: "Integrated Ecosystem Restoration and Hurricane Protection: Louisiana's Comprehensive Master Plan for a Sustainable Coast," the Master Plan represents an overarching vision that fully incorporates hurricane protection projects and structures with coastal wetland and hydrology restoration projects. U.S. Army Corps of Engineers officials will use the CPRA Master Plan as the cornerstone of the Congressionally mandated Louisiana Coastal Protection and Restoration (LaCPR) Report scheduled to be written and submitted to Congress by December 2007.

In 2012, an article in The New York Times reviewed the current state of improvements to New Orleans defenses. August 24, 2015, an article in The Huffington Post titled "10 Years After Katrina, Louisiana Is Becoming A Model For Climate Resilience" summarized the current state of Louisiana's shoreline and coastal community protection.

== Plan for a Sustainable Coast ==
Every five to six years CPRA must submit a revised plan to the state legislature. The current plan is the 2023 Master Plan, which was passed unanimously by the state legislature in May 2023.

Projects detailed in the plan fall into the following categories:

- Risk reduction projects
  - Structural Risk Reduction (earthen levees, concrete T-walls, floodgates)
  - Nonstructural Risk Reduction (elevating residences, commercial floodproofing, acquisition of flood-prone real estate)
- Restoration projects
  - Ridge Restoration (sediment emplacement followed by planting to restore historic, forested ridges)
  - Marsh Creation (sediment emplacement followed by planting)
  - Landbridge (linear, constructed marshes which provide habitat and weaken waves)
  - Diversion (conveyance of sediment-bearing river water into wetland basins)
  - Hydrologic Restoration (ensuring water movement for a healthy ecosystem)
- Programmatic Restoration Projects
  - Barrier Island Maintenance (strengthening of barrier island using dredged sediment)
  - Oyster Reef Restoration
  - Shoreline Protection
  - Bank Stabilization

== Projects ==
There are many projects listed on both the CPRA and CWPPRA websites, and both sites have interactive maps to readily display projects.

As of 2023, Louisiana's Coastal Master Plan intends two diversions:

- On August 8, work will begin to channel the Mississippi west — 75,000 cubic feet per second — into marshes in Barataria. This project will cost an estimated $2.9 billion.
- Later, work will begin to send fresh water east into wetlands in Breton Sound.

== Current members ==
- Current members of the Board are listed on the agency website.

== Districts ==
The following Levee Districts are overseen by the CPRA.

- Atchafalaya Basin Levee District
- Grand Isle Independent District
- Lafourche Basin Levee District
- North Lafouche Levee District
- Plaquemines Parish Government
- Pontchartrain Basin Levee District
- South Lafourche Levee District
- Southeast Louisiana Flood Protection Authority - East
- Southeast Louisiana Flood Protection Authority - West
- St. Mary Parish Government
- Terrebonne Levee and Conservation District

Additionally, decisions are pending on the Southwest Louisiana Parishes of Cameron, Vermillion and Iberia.

== See also ==
- America's WETLAND Foundation
- Coastal Wetlands Planning, Protection and Restoration Act—CWPPRA (a federal agency)
