= Breton Sound =

Coordinates: 29°30′03″N 89°15′02″W

Breton Sound (French: Détroit Breton) is a sound of the Gulf of Mexico and a part of the coastline of the U.S. state of Louisiana. It lies off the southeast coast of the state and is partially enclosed by the Breton Islands.

Two ships in the United States Navy have been named the USS Breton after this area.

On August 29, 2005, Hurricane Katrina crossed the sound before making its third landfall near Pearlington, Mississippi. Both Hurricane Gustav and Katrina caused an estimated loss of 245 km of marshland in the sound, but satellite imagery shows marshland gains in Bayou la Loutre, Bayou Pointe-en-Pointe, and Bayou Terre Aux Boeufs basins, as well as other areas such as River aux Chenes and Bayou Bienvenue near the Mississippi River–Gulf Outlet Canal, and along Bayou Plaquemines and Bayou la Loutre.

In 2023, Louisiana's Coastal Master Plan intends to redirect fresh water from the Mississippi River east into wetlands in Breton Sound.
