= John Bury =

John Bury may refer to:

- John Bury (translator) (1535–1571), English translator
- John Bury (divine) (1580–1667), English divine
- John Bury (captain) (1915–2006), master mariner
- John Bury (theatre designer) (1925–2000), British theatre designer
- John Bury (priest) (fl. 1430s–1470s), canon of Windsor
- J. B. Bury (John Bagnell Bury, 1861–1927), Irish historian
- J. P. T. Bury (John Patrick Tuer Bury, 1908–1987), British historian and nephew of J. B. Bury
- John Bury (English politician) (by 1478–1522/23), MP for Cambridge (UK Parliament constituency)
- John Bury (Irish politician) (by 1715), MP for Askeaton (Parliament of Ireland constituency)

== See also ==
- John Barry (disambiguation)
- John Berry (disambiguation)
