= John Barry =

John Barry may refer to:

== Arts and entertainment ==
- John Arthur Barry (1850–1911), Australian journalist
- John Barry (composer) (1933–2011), English film composer
- John Barry (production designer) (1935–1979), British film production designer
- John M. Barry (born 1947), American writer
- John Wolfe Barry (1836–1918), English architect
- John Barry, drummer and member of Stretch Arm Strong

== Military ==
- John Barry (naval officer) (1745–1803), officer in the Continental Navy during the American Revolutionary War and in the United States Navy
  - Statue of John Barry, memorial in Washington, D.C.
  - SS John Barry, an American Liberty ship
- John D. Barry (1839–1867), brigadier general in the Confederate States Army during the American Civil War
- John Barry (VC recipient) (1873–1901), recipient of the Victoria Cross

== Politics ==
- John Barry (Green Party politician) (born 1966), Irish Green Party politician
- John Barry (MP) (1845–1921), Irish MP for South Wexford 1885–1893
- John Alexander Barry (1790–1872), Canadian merchant and politician in Nova Scotia
- John J. Barry (1924–2005), American labor union leader
- John Patrick Barry (1893–1946), Canadian politician and lawyer
- John S. Barry (1802–1870), governor of Michigan
- Jonathan B. Barry (born 1945), American politician and public servant

== Religion ==
- John Barry (bishop of Savannah) (1799–1859), Irish-born American bishop in the Roman Catholic Church
- John Barry (Australian bishop) (1875–1938), Roman Catholic bishop of Goulburn
- John Barry (dean of Elphin) (1728–1794), Irish Anglican dean
- Sir John Barry, rector of St Andrew's Church, Chew Stoke, 1524–1546

== Sports ==
- Jack Barry (baseball) (1887–1961), given name John, American baseball shortstop and coach
- John Barry (tennis) (born 1928), New Zealand tennis player
- John Burke Barry (1880–1937), member of the U.S. equestrian team at the 1924 Summer Olympics
- John Joe Barry (1925–1994), Irish Olympic athlete
- Jon Barry (born 1969), American basketball player
- Jonathan Barry (born 1988), Bahamian cricketer
- Shad Barry (1878–1936), given name John, American baseball player

== Other ==
- John Milner Barry (1768–1822), Irish doctor
- John Vincent Barry (1903–1969), Supreme Court justice for Victoria, Australia
- John Barry (WD-40) (1924–2009), American business executive; popularized the WD-40 water-displacing spray and lubricant
- John Barry (ship), one of several vessels named John Barry
- John Barry, used by Australians as a placeholder name, similar to John Q. Public

== See also ==
- John Barrie (disambiguation)
- Jack Barry (disambiguation)
- John Berry (disambiguation)
- Jonathan Berry (disambiguation)
