= Audubon Zoo =

Zoo in New Orleans, Louisiana, United States

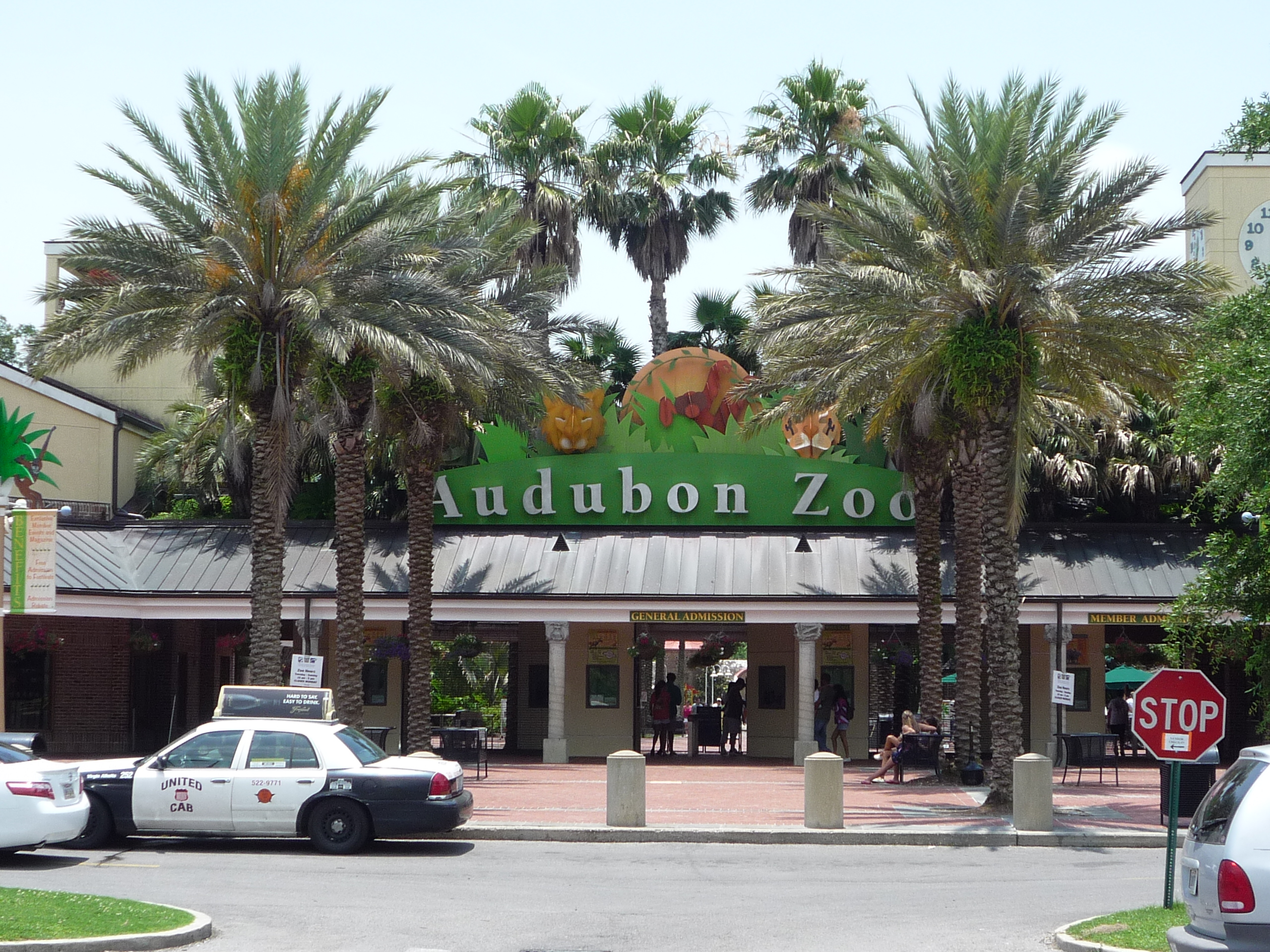
- Main Entrance
- Interactive map of Audubon Zoo
- 29.9231°N 90.1322°W
- Date opened: 1914
- Location: New Orleans, Louisiana, United States
- Land area: 58 acres (23 ha)
- No. of animals: 2,000
- Memberships: AZA, WAZA
- Major exhibits: African Savanna, Asian Domain, Audubon Aviary, Jaguar Jungle, Louisiana Swamp, Reptile Encounter, Sea Lion Theater, South American Pampas, World of Primates
- Website: audubonnatureinstitute.org/zoo

Audubon Zoo is an American zoo located in New Orleans, Louisiana. It is part of the Audubon Nature Institute which also manages Audubon Aquarium, Audubon Louisiana Nature Center, Freeport-McMoran Species Survival Center, Audubon Park, and Audubon Coastal Wildlife Network. It covers 58 acres (23 ha) and is home to over 2,000 animals. It is located in a section of Audubon Park in Uptown New Orleans, on the Mississippi River side of Magazine Street. The zoo and park are named in honor of artist and naturalist John James Audubon who lived in New Orleans starting in 1821.

== History ==
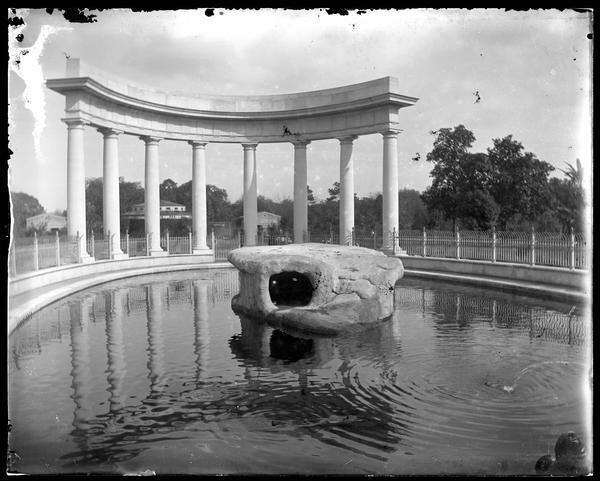
Odenheimer Sea Lion Pool, 1924

The site of the zoo has housed animal exhibits since the World Cotton Centennial 1884 Exhibition World's Fair, though the current incarnation of the zoo was not built until the early 20th century. In 1916, a flight cage was added, and during the boom of the 1920s, many other additions were made, such as a sea lion pool in 1928. This pool, along with a few other art nouveau buildings, can still be seen today.

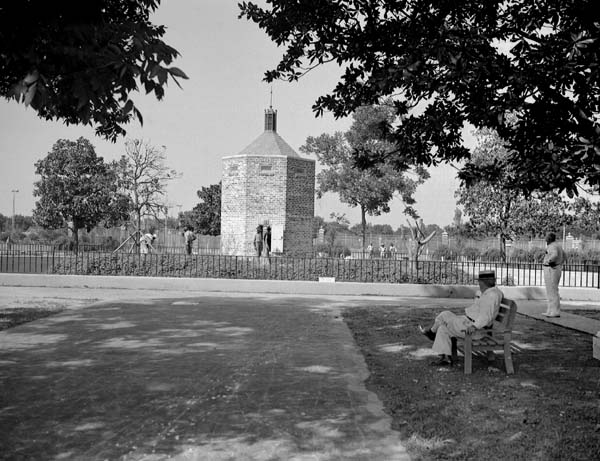
WPA work on Monkey Island, 1936

During the Great Depression, a $400,000 expansion of the zoo was conducted by the Works Progress Administration. Many new cages were constructed, along with an artificial hill known as "Monkey Hill", built as an attraction for children in the relatively flat New Orleans area. Locals claim Monkey Hill to be the highest point in New Orleans, although another artificial hill in City Park actually competes for that title.

By the early 1970s, the zoo had fallen into a state of decay. The small prison-like cages made of bricks and steel bars constructed by the WPA were no longer considered appropriate environments for many of the animals displayed within them. A study suggested that the zoo should be closed down unless the city could make a major commitment to upgrade it. City government, local businesses, and private citizens rallied in support of it, and in 1975 the city's voters approved a measure to finance its rebuilding. Zoo grounds were expanded from 14 to 50 acres (57,000 to 200,000 m^{2}). That same year, New Orleans funk band The Meters released the song "They All Ask'd for You," which references Audubon Zoo and has become the zoo's unofficial theme song. By the end of the decade, the Audubon Zoo was already well on its way to becoming one of the finest in the United States.

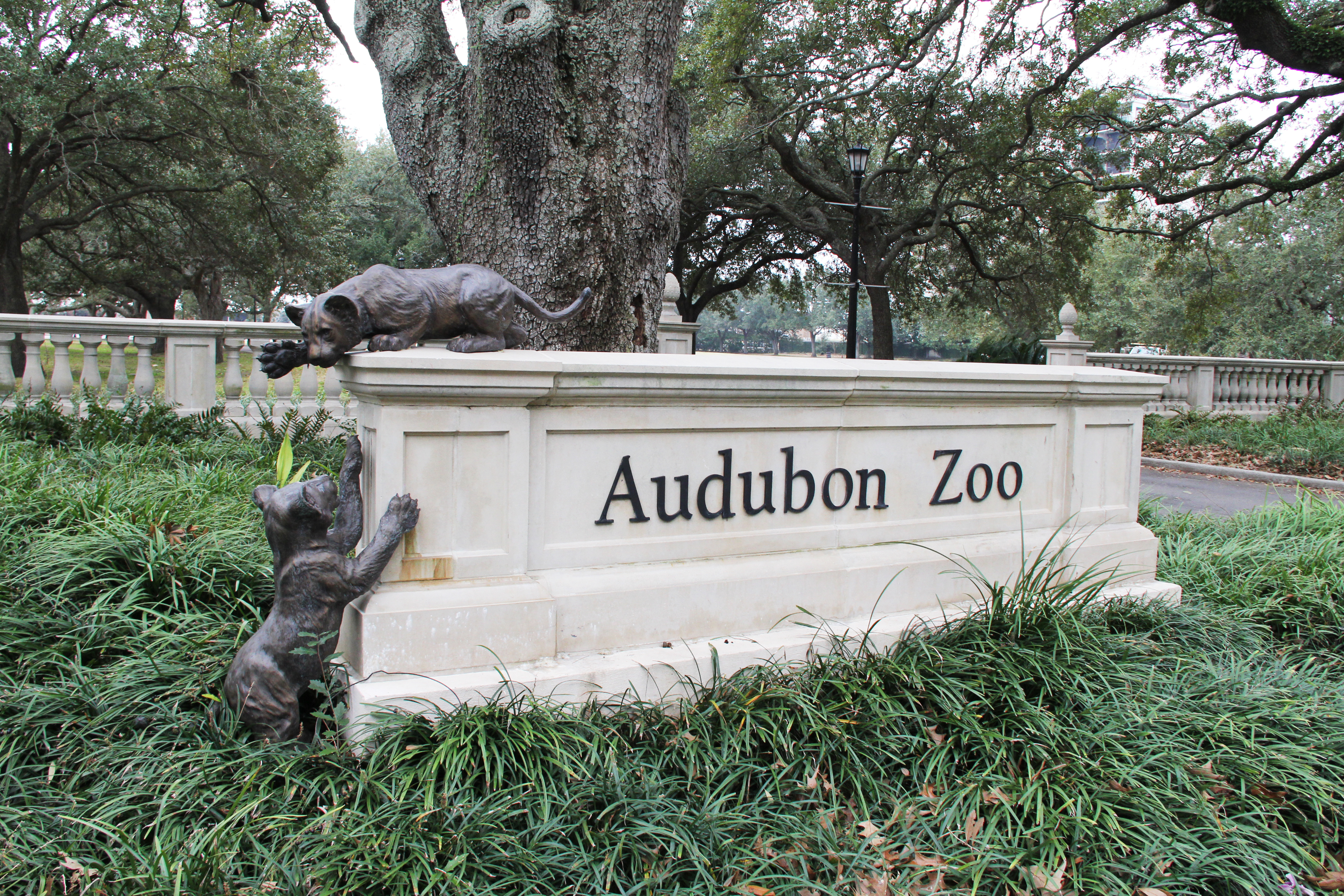
Entrance to zoo parking on Magazine Street

More improvements and expansions continued into the 21st century, making the Audubon Zoo popular not only with locals but also drawing substantial numbers of tourists visiting from other states and from abroad.

In 1987, an alligator nest was discovered with 18 freshly hatched babies with white hides—an extraordinary natural mutation called leucism, not to be confused with albinism. They received much attention when they went on display, and the white alligator became a symbol of the zoo.

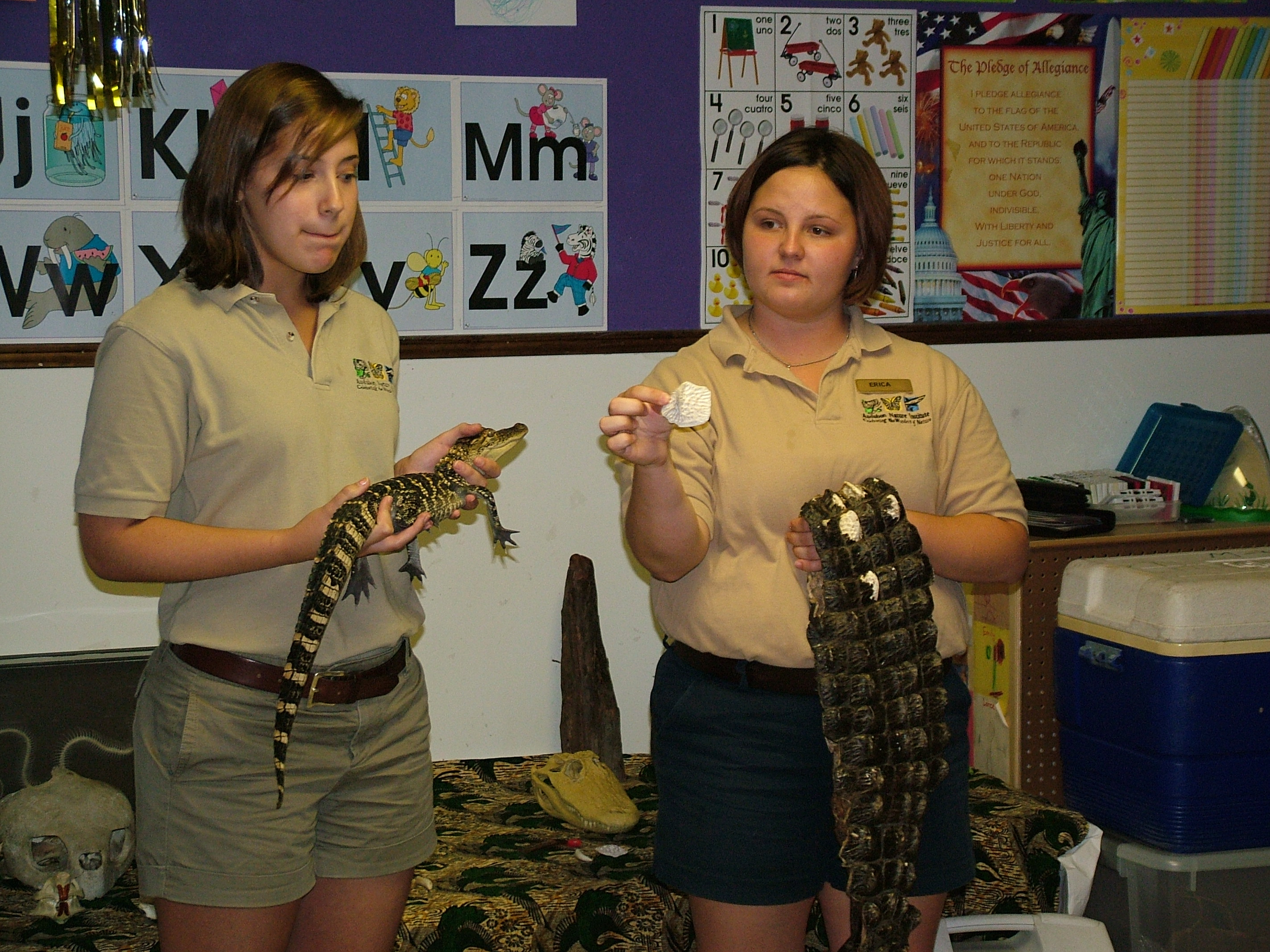
Educational demonstration featuring alligators at the Audubon Zoo's Wetlands Express

In 1990, the Audubon Nature Institute, which manages the zoo, opened Audubon Aquarium in the CBD at the edge of the French Quarter. Some of the white alligators were transferred there, and a riverboat began service taking visitors between the facilities.

The WPA-era Monkey Hill, a favorite landmark of generations of New Orleans children, underwent extensive renovation in the early 21st century, including the addition of a waterfall for young children to play in, a rope web that goes to the summit, and a 20-foot-high (6.1 m) "safari outpost" at the base of the hill. For the sake of posterity, a portion of it was left as grass for children to play on.

In 2005, Hurricane Katrina hit New Orleans, followed by severe consequences in the devastating aftermath of the storm. During the hurricane, zoo staff found refuge in the reptile house, which was designed to withstand major weather events. Located on high ground atop an old natural river levee, the building was not flooded. Most of the animals survived—only three died—and the only major damage was downed trees. However, the zoo was short on food and other necessities in the days after the storm, and pumps were overheating.

The fact that the zoo sustained only minor damage can be attributed to disaster planning and its location on high ground. Zoo curator Dan Maloney was quoted as saying, "The zoo had planned for years for the catastrophic storm that has long been predicted for New Orleans."

The zoo reopened for Thanksgiving weekend in November 2005 and initiated a weekends-only schedule due to financial constraints. On March 1, 2006, it began a Wednesday-through-Sunday schedule, and eventually expanded to Tuesday through Sunday.

For a period around 2011 the Lycée Français de la Nouvelle-Orléans (LFNO) used three rooms at the zoo as classrooms on a temporary basis.

On July 14, 2018, a jaguar named Valerio escaped through the roof of its enclosure, killing six animals and injuring another three before being recaptured. The incident occurred before the zoo had opened.

== Notable attractions ==
Near the entrance are exhibits for American flamingos and whooping cranes.

=== Asian Domain ===
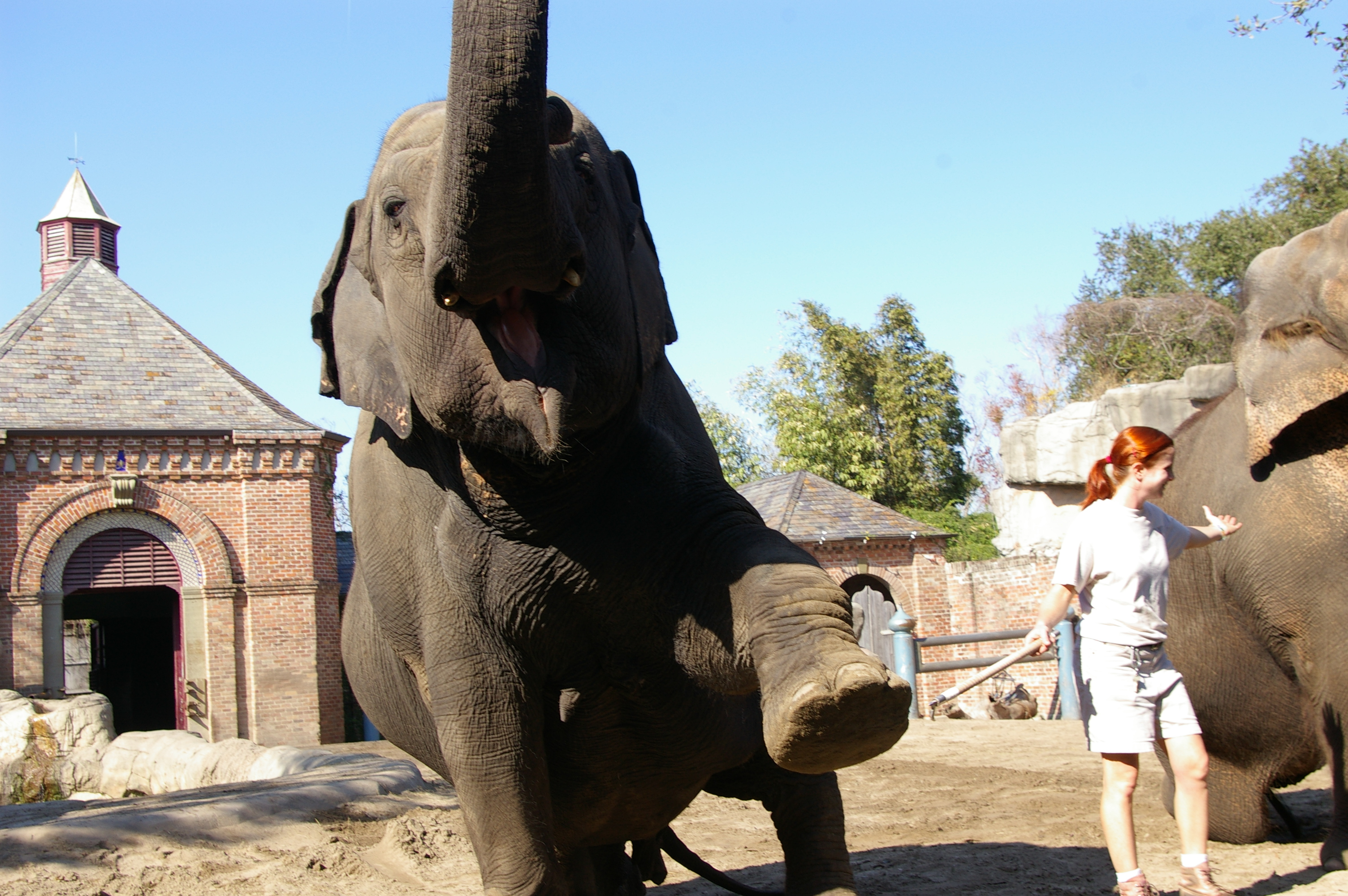
Asian elephants with zookeeper during a show

Home to the zoo's Asian animals. Sumatran orangutans are housed in the former elephant yard. The zoo's Asian elephants live in a few large yards with enrichment structures and pools. Also living in this area are Amur leopards, sun bears, Asian small-clawed otters, North Sulawesi babirusa, Malayan tigers and barasingha.

=== World of Primates ===
World of Primates houses a variety of primates like a troop of western lowland gorillas, mandrills, black-and-white colobus monkeys, Wolf's guenons, black howler monkeys, golden lion tamarin, black-and-white ruffed lemurs, siamang and the only Angolan talapoins in North America.

=== African Savanna ===
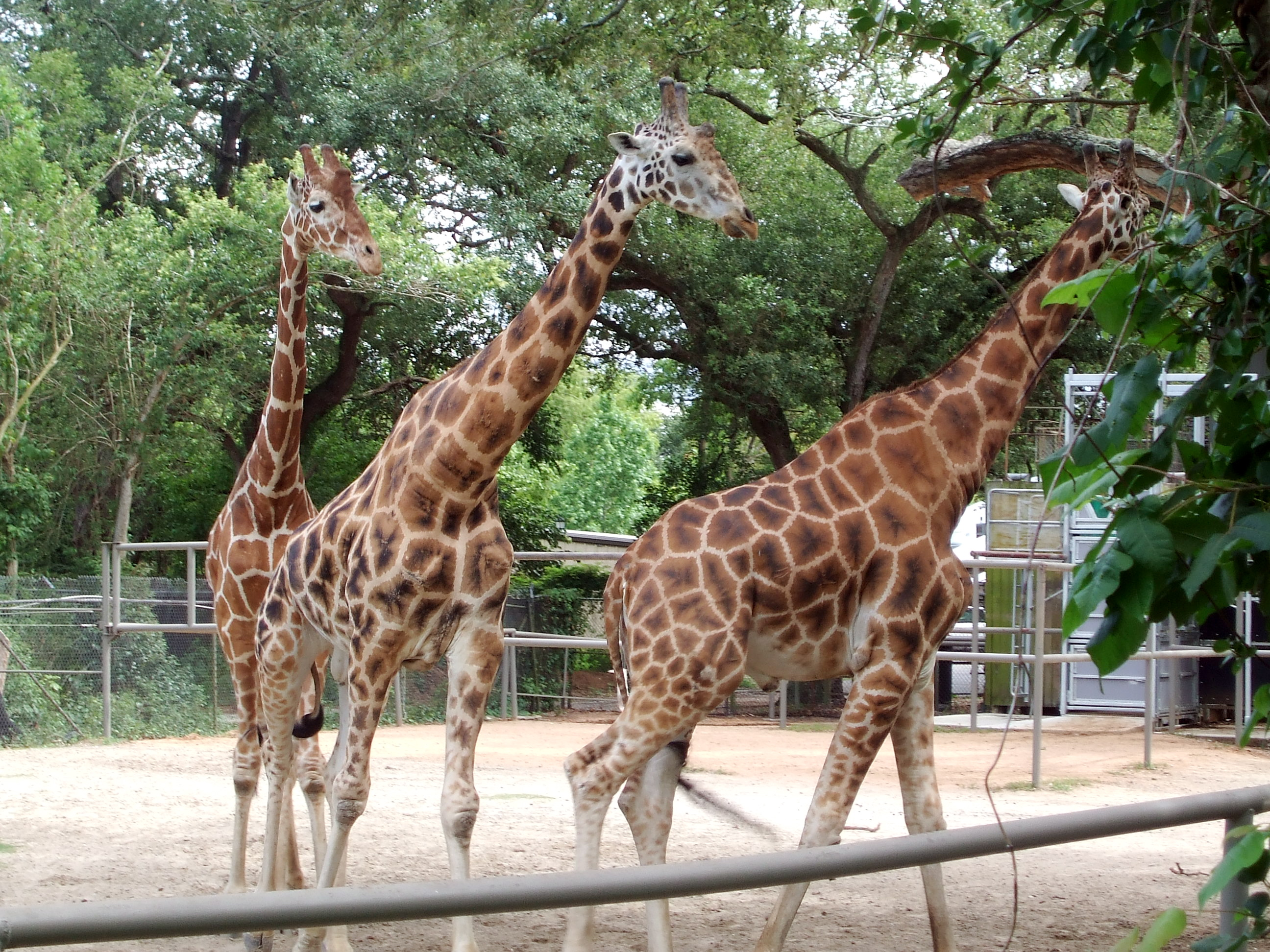
Giraffes at the African Savanna

In front of the Savanna is the zoo's petting zoo, the Watoto Walk, which houses donkeys, miniature zebu, goats and sheep. The first enclosure in the Savanna consists of giraffes, black crowned cranes and marabou storks. Nearby are habitats for African wild dogs and lions. A paddock with a large pond houses great white pelicans and pink-backed pelicans along with Thomson's gazelles, nyala and Abyssinian ground hornbills. A third habitat houses white rhinos, Burchell's zebras and blue wildebeest while the final habitat houses red river hogs.

=== South American Pampas ===
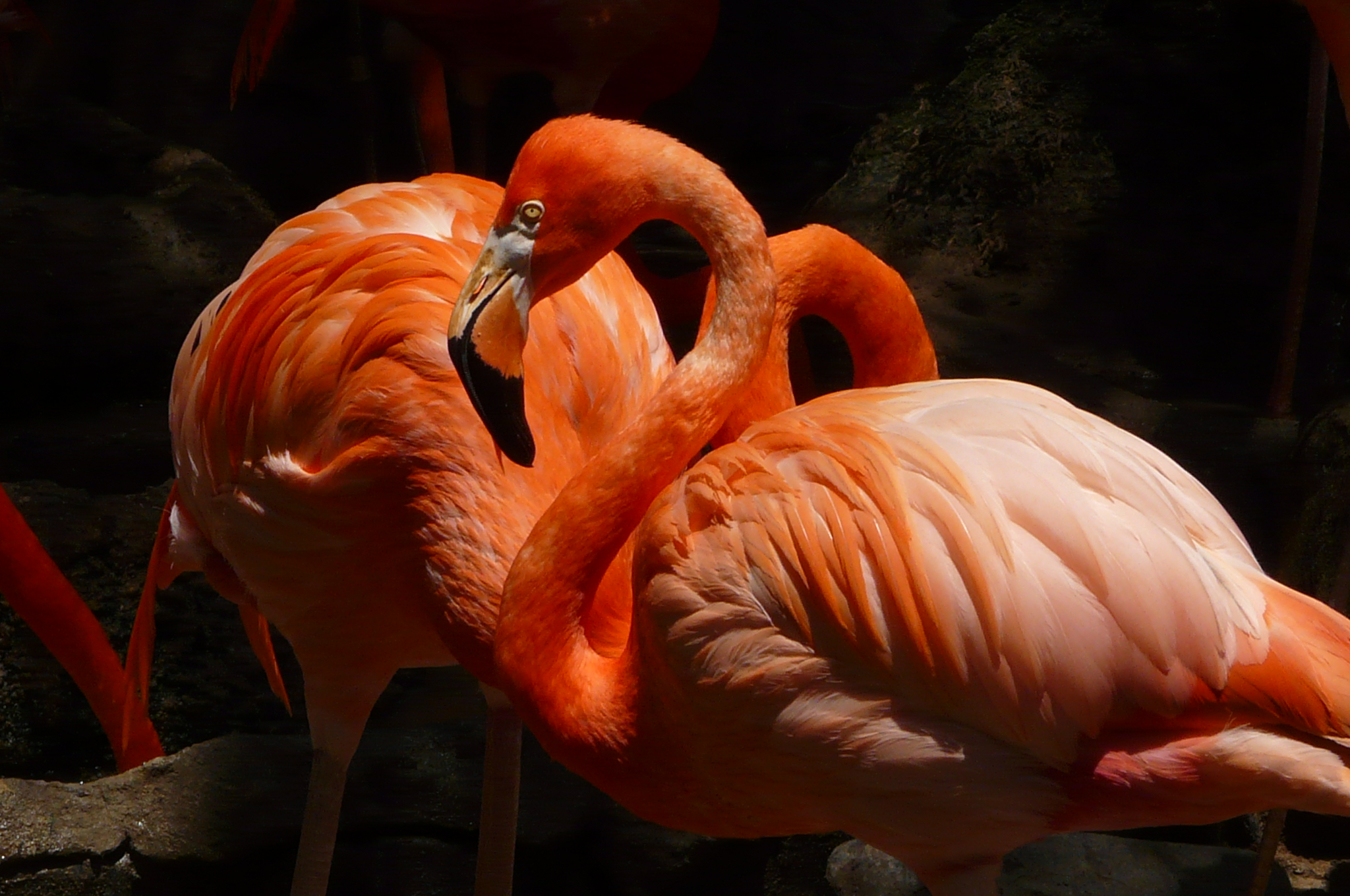
Caribbean flamingos

At the entrance of this area is the maned wolf enclosure. Right over is a boardwalk across a large pond which houses Caribbean flamingos, American white pelicans and brown pelicans. Along the boardwalk is a large yard for capybaras, greater rheas, king vultures and Patagonian maras. The yard across has Baird's tapirs, guanacos and coscoroba swans.

=== Jaguar Jungle ===
This area has the theme of a ruined Mayan temple and it includes jaguars, giant anteaters, St. Vincent agoutis, ocelots, Geoffroy's spider monkeys, alpacas, maguari storks, scarlet macaws, blue-and-yellow macaws and common boa.

A new nocturnal house named "Criaturas de la Noche" was opened in 2019 featuring Seba's short-tailed bats, Nancy Ma's night monkeys, ringtails, common vampire bats, Anthony's poison arrow frogs, red-eyed tree frogs, Central American giant cave cockroaches and Costa Rican zebra tarantulas.

=== Audubon Aviary ===
This free-flight aviary features more than 30 species of birds from around the world such as the blue-crowned laughingthrushes, Indian peafowl, Nicobar pigeons, scarlet ibises and Taveta golden weavers. Outside the aviary is a yard for emus.

=== Louisiana Swamp ===
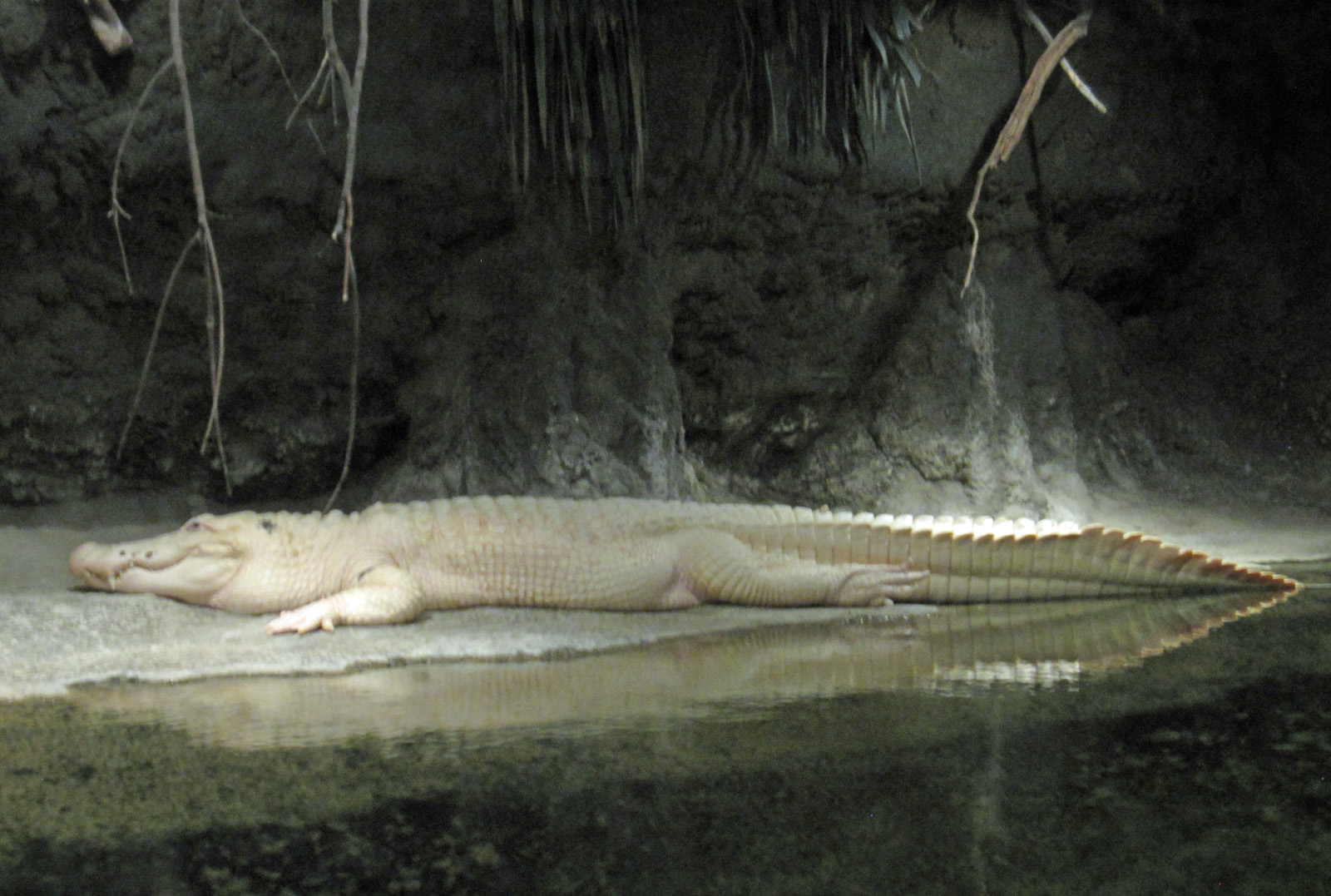
Due to high visibility, albino alligators are unlikely to survive in the wild and this is one of very few albino specimens known.

This exhibit is primarily outdoors, housing many samples of animals native to southern Louisiana. These include American black bears, cougars, bobcats, red foxes, North American river otters, nutria, raccoons, various fish and snakes, blue crabs, alligator snapping turtles and American alligators of both normal pigmentation and the leucistic variety.

After Hurricane Katrina, it was thematically decorated to mimic the scenes seen around the city. There was a small Katrina refrigerator taped up outside of the front door, a blue tarp stretched over the roof, and a marking that indicated no casualties were found in it, rather, that the eight alligators that inhabit it were fed with the notion of the number 8 and "Gators Fed".

=== Reptile Encounter ===
One of the newer and more famous residents of the Reptile Encounter exhibit is the Komodo dragon. Many other animals are also housed here, including the panther chameleon, Gila monster, false gharial, green anaconda, gaboon viper and other reptiles and amphibians.

=== Sea Lion Theater ===
California sea lions live in a large lagoon. Two females named Ayah and Jolee arrived at the zoo in 2017 from the Marine Mammal Care Center Los Angeles. Both were found stranded and were rescued; Jolee was suffering from cataracts and flipper abrasions and Ayah had a small-caliber bullet in her brain, resulting in the loss of her left eye.

== Gallery ==
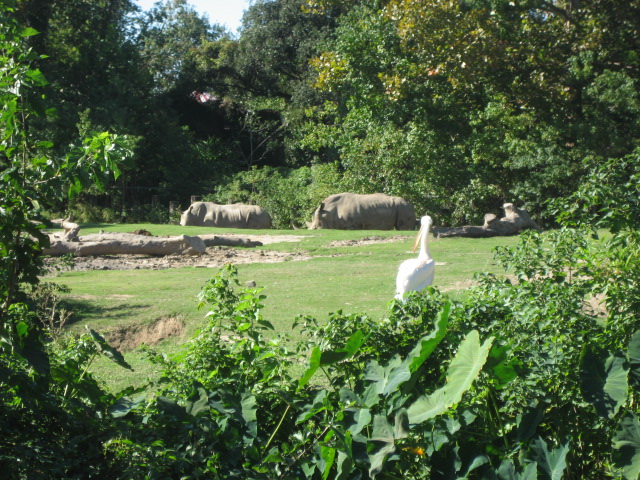
Rhinoceros exhibit

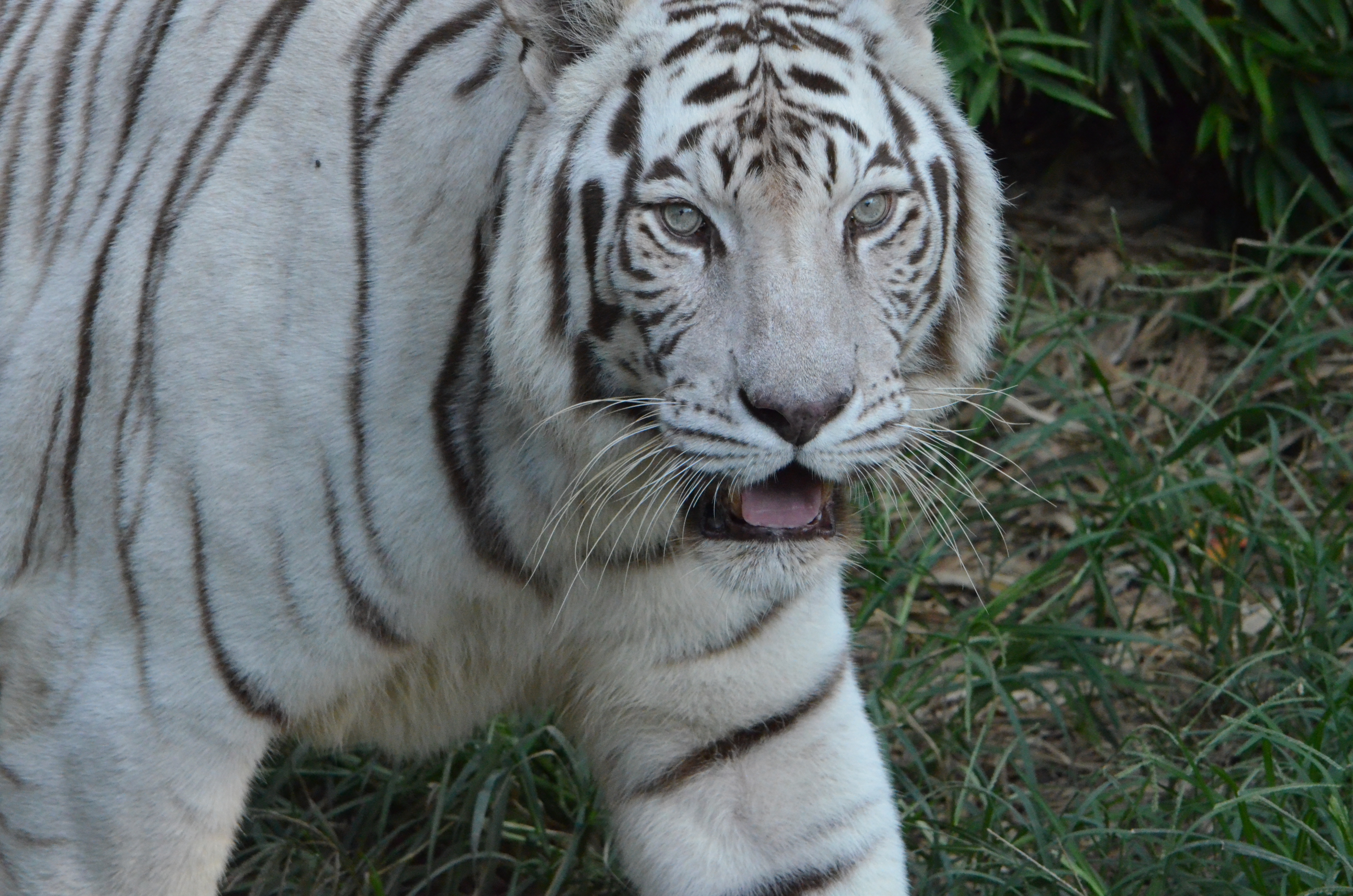
White tiger

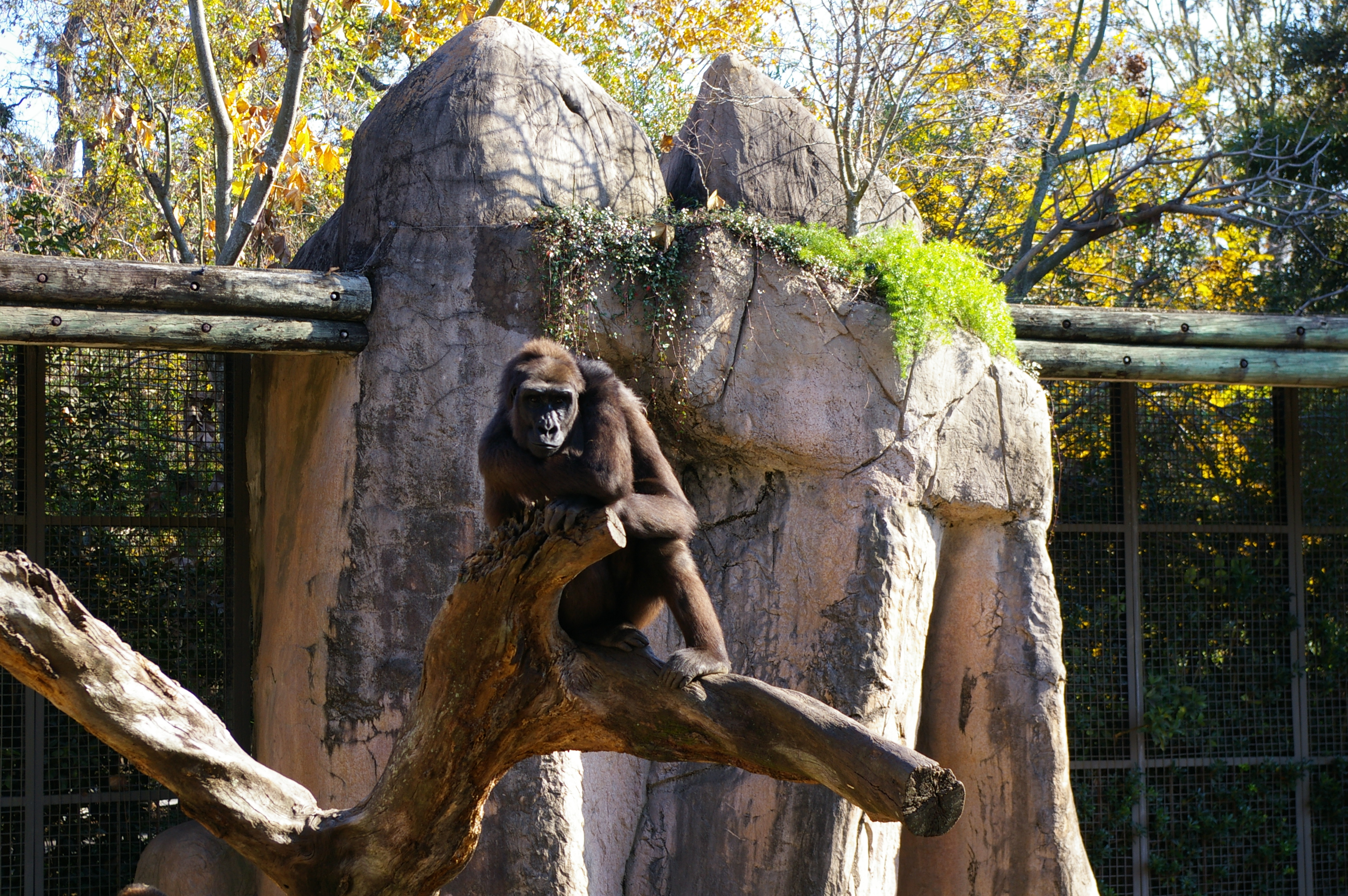
Primates exhibit

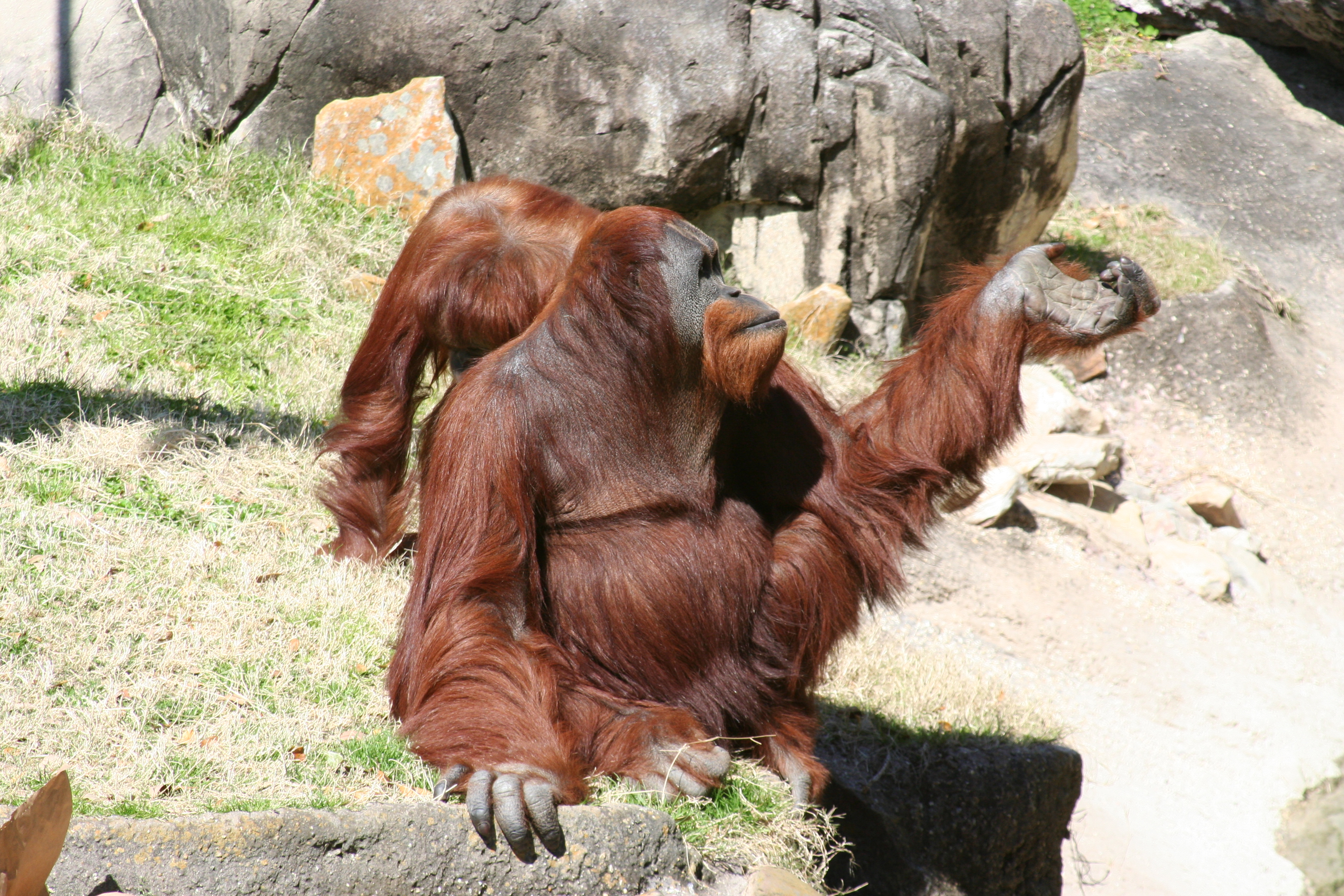
Orangutans

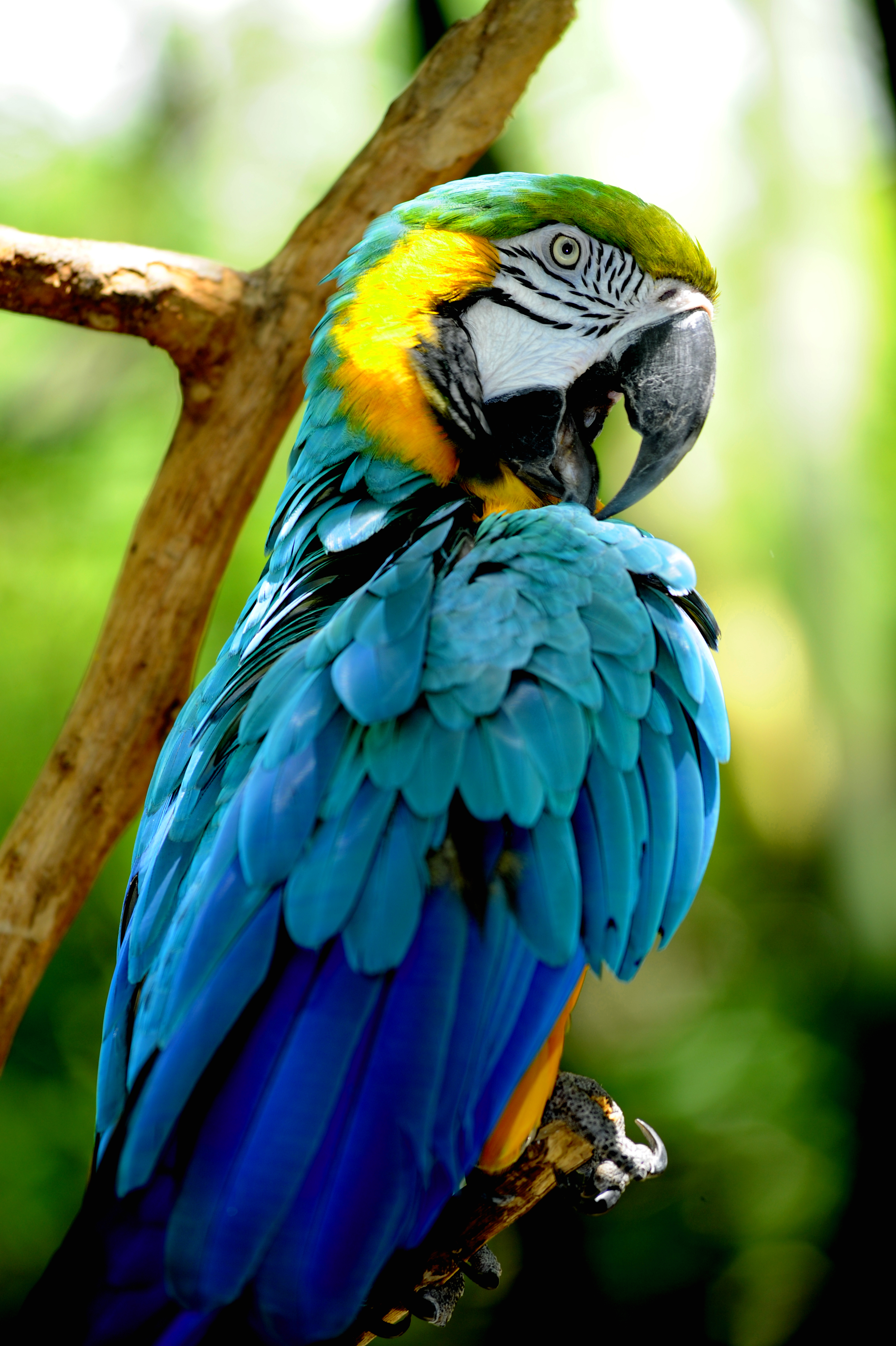
Blue-and-yellow macaw (Ara ararauna)

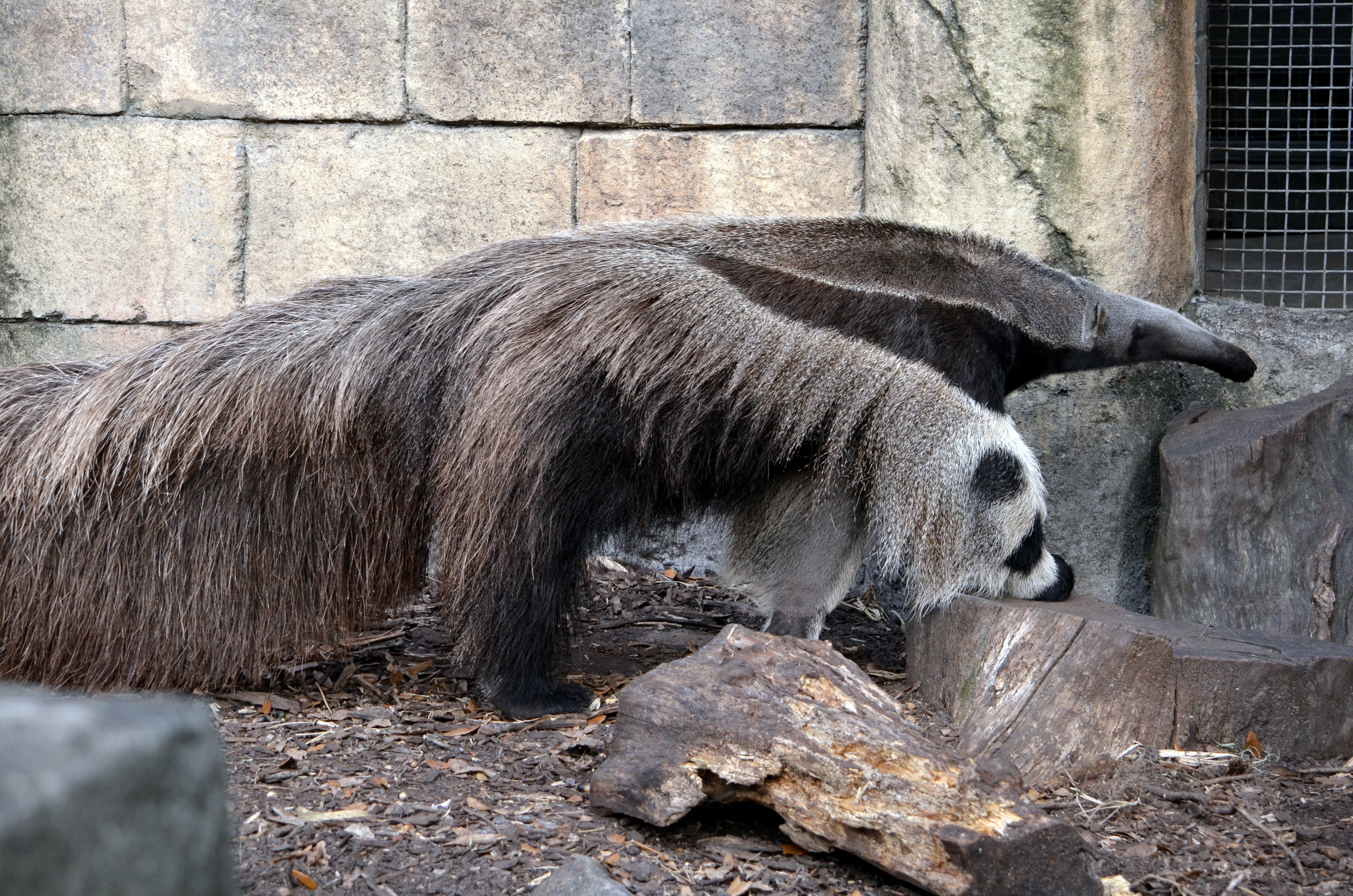
Giant anteater (Myrmecophaga tridactyla)

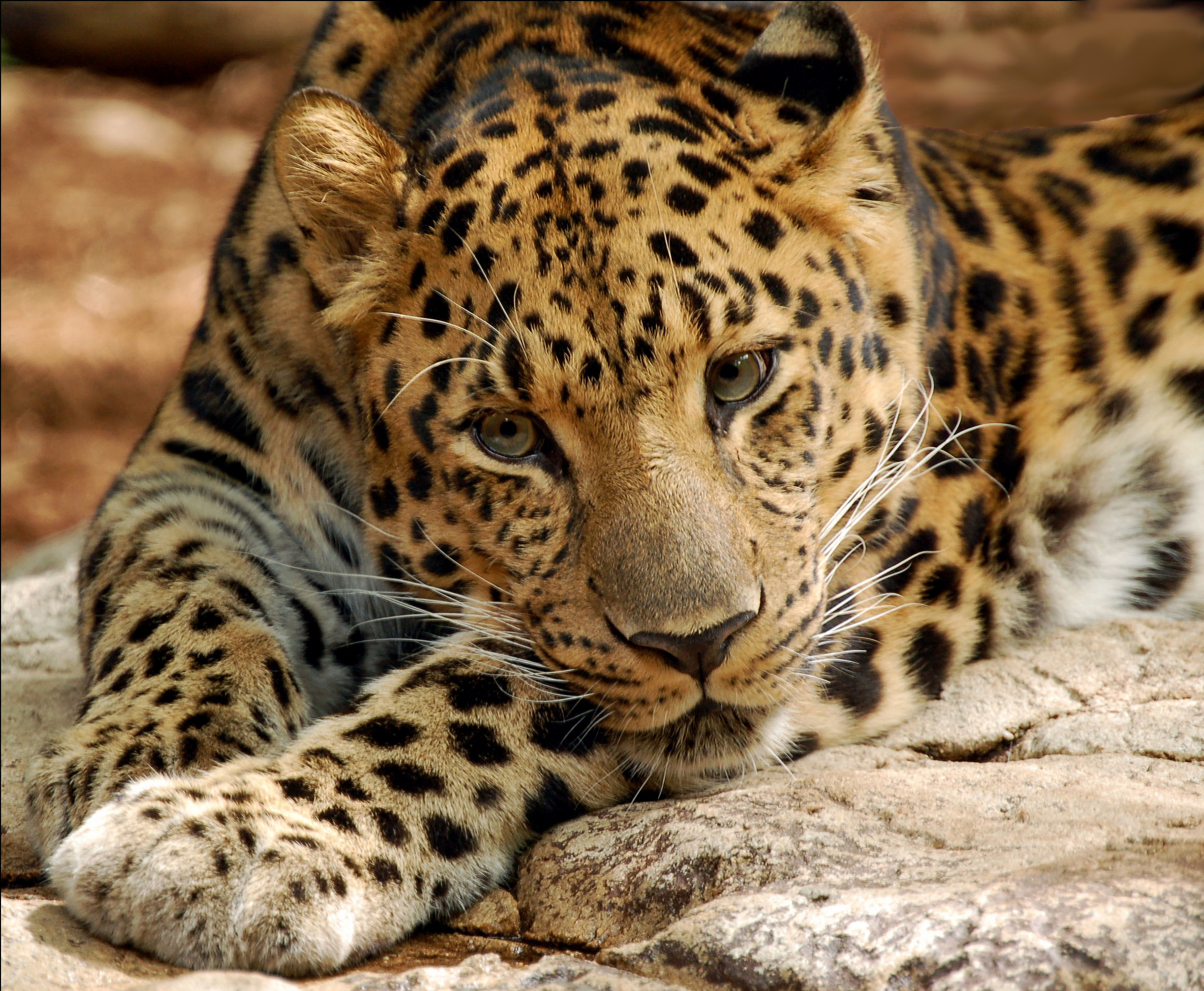
Amur leopard (Panthera pardus orientalis)

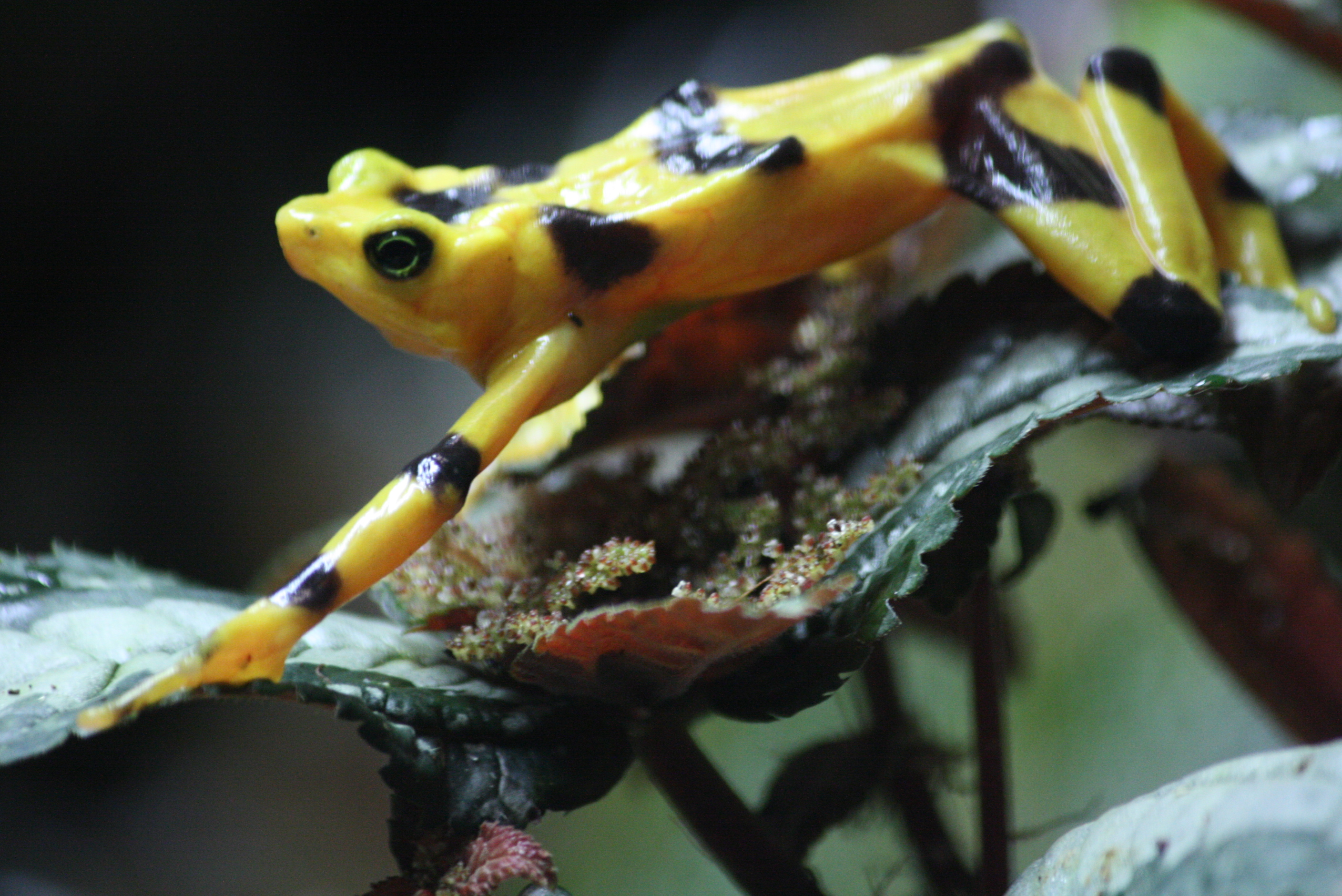
Yellow and black frog

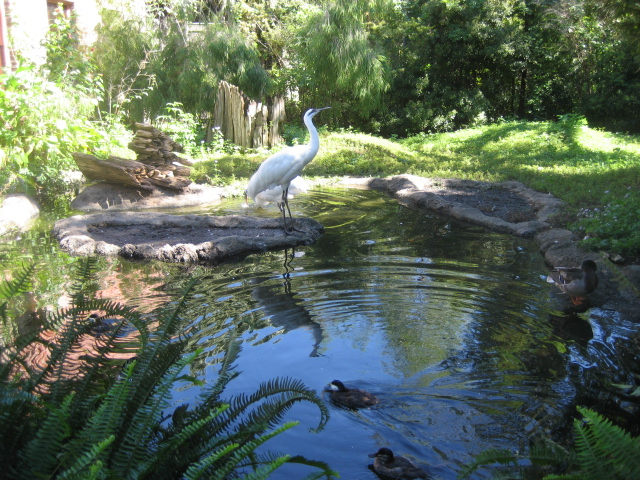
Crane in an exhibit

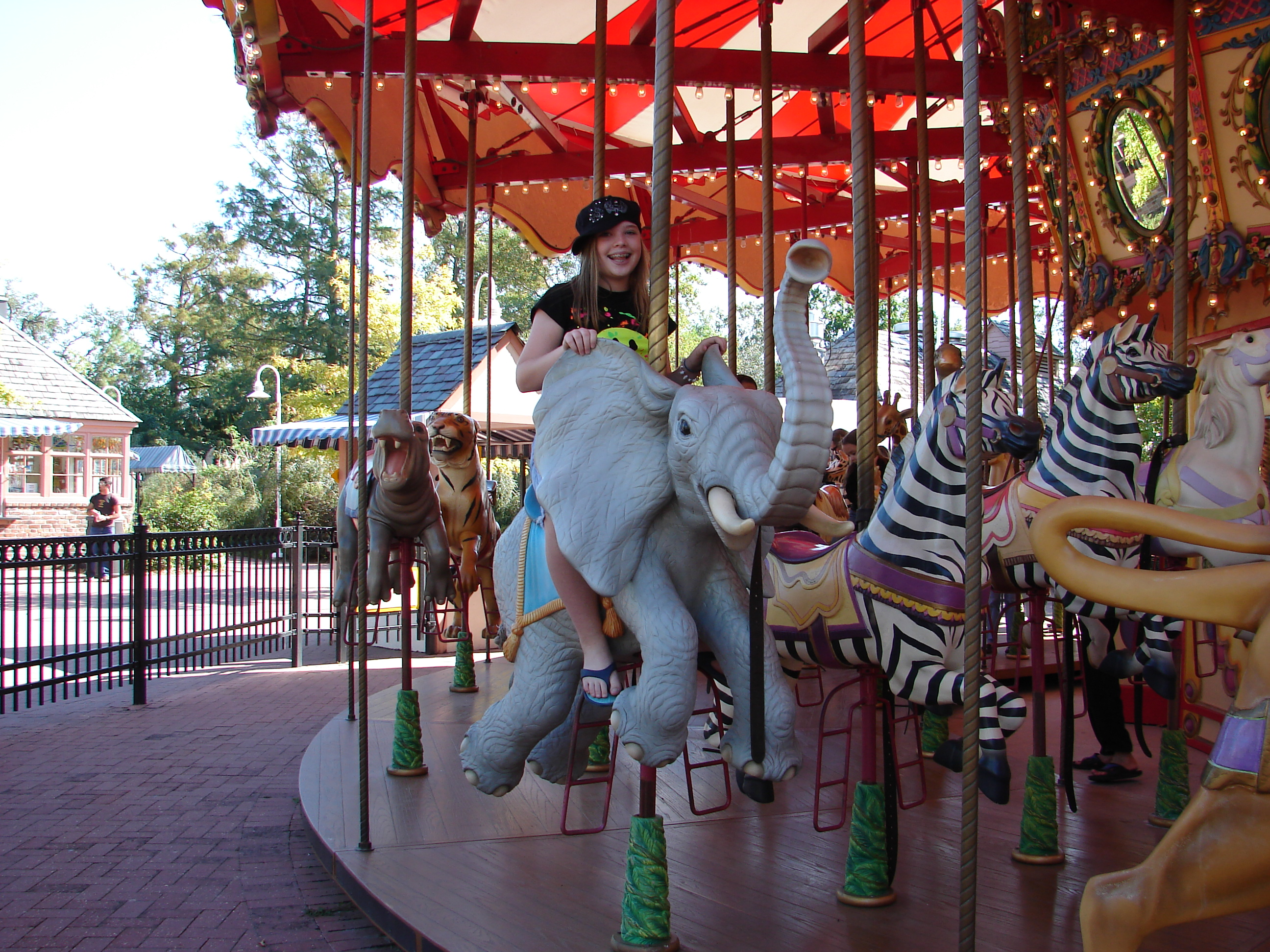
Carousel at the zoo
