= John Berry =

John Berry may refer to:

== Entertainment ==
- John Berry (film director) (1917–1999), American film director
- John Berry (illustrator) (1920–2009), British illustrator
- John Berry (country singer) (born 1959), American country singer
  - John Berry (album), debut album
- John Berry (arts administrator) (born 1961), British musician and arts administrator
- John Berry (Beastie Boys) (1963–2016), American member of the Beastie Boys

== Politics ==
- John Berry (ambassador) (born 1959), director of the U.S. Office of Personnel Management (2009–2013), ambassador to Australia
- John Berry (Arkansas politician) (1800–1856), state legislator in Arkansas.
- John Berry (congressman) (1833–1879), U.S. representative from Ohio
- John Berry (New Jersey governor) (1619–1712), deputy governor of New Jersey
- John G. Berry (1838–1923), American politician in Michigan
- John M. Berry (Kentucky politician) (1935–2016), American politician in Kentucky
- John M. Berry (Minnesota politician) (1827–1887), American jurist and politician in Minnesota
- John T. Berry (1924–1966), American politician in Massachusetts
- John Walter Berry (1868–1943), Canadian politician
- John Wesley Berry (1858–1931), Tacoma councilman

== Sports ==
- John Berry (cricketer) (1823–1895), British cricketer
- John Berry (rugby) (1866–1930), rugby union footballer
- John Berry (footballer, born 1880) (1880–1954), English footballer
- John Paul Berry (1918–1970), American baseball pitcher and first baseman
- Johnny Berry (1926–1994), Manchester United and England footballer
- Jack Berry (journalist) (1931–2026), American sports journalist
- John Berry (speedway promoter) (1944–2012), British speedway promoter and England national team manager

== Other ==
- John Berry (Royal Navy officer) (1635–1689/90), British naval officer involved in the settlement of Newfoundland
- John Cutting Berry (1847–1936), American medical missionary to Japan
- John Berry (priest) (1849–1923), Church of England priest and Royal Navy chaplain
- John Berry (zoologist) (1907–2002), Scottish zoologist and ecologist
- John N. Berry (1933–2020), American librarian
- John Stevens Berry, American attorney
- John W. Berry (psychologist) (born 1939), Canadian psychologist
- John W. Berry (librarian) (born 1947), American librarian

== See also ==
- Jack Berry (disambiguation)
- John Barry (disambiguation)
- John Bury (disambiguation)
- Jonathan Berry (disambiguation)
- John Fraser de Berry (1816–1876), Quebec lawyer and politician
