= Jack Barry =

Jack Barry may refer to:

- Jack Barry (baseball) (1887–1961), American baseball player and manager
- Jack Barry (Gaelic footballer) (born 1994), county player for Kerry
- Jack Barry (game show host) (1918–1984), American television host and producer
- Jack Barry (unionist) (1924–2005), American labor union leader
- Shad Barry (1878–1936), known also as Jack Barry, American baseball player

== See also ==
- Jack Berry (disambiguation)
- John Barry (disambiguation)
