= John Barrie =

John Barrie may refer to:

- John Barrie (actor) (1917–1980), English actor
- John Barrie (footballer) (1925–2015), Scottish footballer
- John Barrie (snooker player) (1924–1996), English snooker player

== See also ==
- John Barry (disambiguation)
