= Jack Berry =

Jack Berry may refer to:

- Jack Berry (journalist) (1931–2026), American sports journalist
- Jack Berry (hurler) (1944–2003), Irish hurler
- Jack K. Berry (1930–2022), member of the Georgia House of Representatives

== See also ==
- John Berry (disambiguation)
- Jack Barry (disambiguation)
