= John M. Barry =

American author and historian

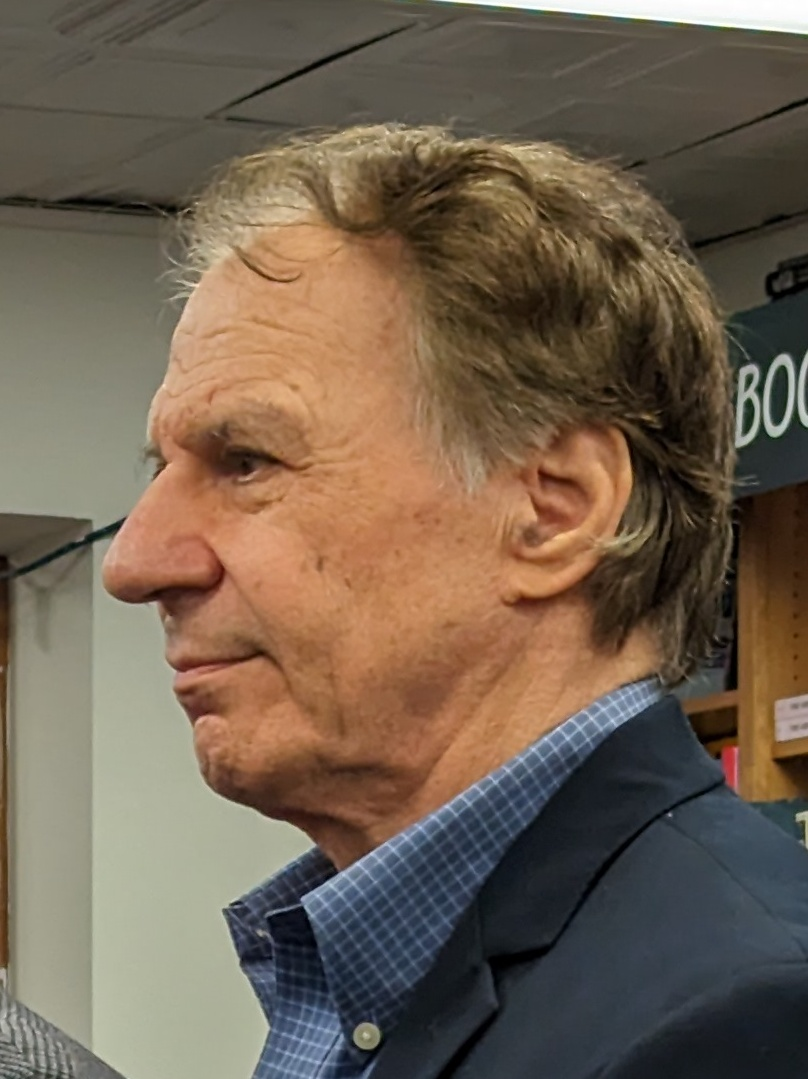
- Barry in 2023
- Born: April 12, 1947 (age 79); Providence, Rhode Island
- Education: Brown University; University of Rochester

John M. Barry (born April 12, 1947) is an American author and historian who has written books on the Great Mississippi Flood of 1927, the influenza pandemic of 1918, and the development of the modern form of the ideas of separation of church and state and individual liberty. He is a professor at the Tulane University School of Public Health and Tropical Medicine and Distinguished Scholar at Tulane's Bywater Institute.

== Life and education ==
Barry was born in Providence, Rhode Island, and graduated from Brown University in 1968. He entered a Ph.D. program at the University of Rochester but withdrew from graduate school in the middle of the semester after he received his M.A. in History in 1969. He then coached high school and college football. In 2021 he was inducted into the Tulane University Athletic Hall of Fame for his role as a coach of the 1973 Tulane football team, and his first several published articles appeared in a professional journal for coaches, Scholastic Coach. In the 1970s he began freelancing for magazines and moved to Washington DC, where he frequently contributed to The Washington Post Sunday Magazine and was Washington editor of the now-defunct Dun's Review and Dun's Business Month.

== Literary works ==
His first book, The Ambition and the Power: A True Story of Washington, appeared in 1989 and explored the operation of the U.S. Congress, the use of power by Speaker of the House Jim Wright, and the rise of future Speaker Newt Gingrich. In 1995 the New York Times named it one of the eleven best books ever written on Congress and Washington.

With Steven Rosenberg, MD, PhD, chief of the Surgery Branch at the National Cancer Institute and a pioneer in the development of "immunotherapy" for cancer—stimulating the immune system to attack cancer—Barry co-authored his second book, The Transformed Cell: Unlocking the Mysteries of Cancer, which was published in 12 languages.

Barry's 1997 book Rising Tide: The Great Mississippi Flood of 1927 and How It Changed America appeared on the New York Times Best Seller list and won the 1998 Francis Parkman Prize from the Society of American Historians for the year's best book on American history. In 2005, the New York Public Library named it one of the fifty best books of all kinds—fiction, nonfiction, and poetry—in the preceding 50 years. His work on water-related issues was recognized by the U.S. National Academies of Science in its invitation to give the 2006 Abel Wolman Distinguished Lecture on Water Resources; he is the only non-scientist ever to give that lecture.

His 2004 book The Great Influenza: The Epic Story of the Greatest Plague in History was also a New York Times Best Seller, and won the 2005 Keck Communication Award from the United States National Academies of Sciences, Engineering, and Medicine for the year's outstanding book on science or medicine. In 2005 he also won the "September 11th Award" from the Center for Biodefense and Emerging Pathogens at Brown University. He has served on a federal government's Infectious Disease Board of Experts, on the advisory board of Massachusetts Institute of Technology's Center for Engineering Fundamentals, and on the advisory committee at Johns Hopkins Bloomberg School of Public Health for its Center for Refugee and Disaster Response. This work resulted in Barry's induction into Delta Omega, an academic honorary society for public health.

Roger Williams and the Creation of the American Soul: Church, State, and the Birth of Liberty (2012)

== Policymaking ==
Two of his books involved him directly in policy-making. From January 2007 until October 16, 2013, he was a member of the Southeast Louisiana Flood Protection Authority - East (SLFPAE), the levee board responsible for protecting the New Orleans metro area on the east bank of the Mississippi River. He has advised the private sector and local, state, national, and international government officials about preparing for another influenza pandemic. He has also both advised officials and taken a direct role in preparing for water-related disasters. A resident of New Orleans, after Hurricane Katrina he was also named to both the Southeast Louisiana Flood Protection Authority (SLFPA), which is the levee board overseeing several separate levee districts in the New Orleans area, and the state's Coastal Protection and Restoration Authority, which is responsible for hurricane protection for the entire state.

Recognizing that protecting New Orleans from storm surge required restoring much of coastal Louisiana, which had once served as a buffer between the city and the ocean and 2,000 square miles of which had disappeared, he proposed to the levee board that it file a lawsuit against oils companies responsible for a significant amount of the damage. His colleagues agreed and on July 24, 2013, SLFPAE filed a lawsuit against ExxonMobil, BP, Shell, Chevron and 94 other oil, gas, and pipeline companies for their role in damage to Louisiana's coast. Barry was the chief architect of this suit, and was the authority's spokesperson on it. Governor Bobby Jindal immediately demanded SLFPAE withdraw the lawsuit. The board was created after Hurricane Katrina by a constitutional amendment, and its members—unlike members of other levee boards in the state—cannot be removed by the governor without cause. However, when Barry's term on the board expired, Jindal did not reappoint him. The board continues to support the suit, and Barry continues to argue for it, speaking at Rotary Clubs and similar groups throughout Louisiana to generate political support. Nonetheless, in June 2014 the state legislature passed a bill attempting to retroactively kill the lawsuit. Despite a veto urged by Attorney General Buddy Caldwell and 116 law school professors who warned that the bill undermined some of the state's claims against BP for the 2010 spill—and the opinion that the bill did not even kill the lawsuit—Jindal signed the bill, which became Act 544. In August 2014, attorneys for the board filed a motion seeking a partial summary judgment arguing that Act 544 does not apply to the flood authority and that the law is unconstitutional. A state court ruled that flood authority lawyers were correct on both counts; in a separate action, a federal district court dismissed the case. Both lower court rulings are now on appeal, one in the state Supreme Court and one at the federal Fifth Circuit Court of Appeal.

== Other work ==
Barry has written for The New York Times, The Wall Street Journal, Time Magazine, Fortune, The Washington Post, Esquire, and other publications and frequently appears as a guest commentator on networks in the U.S., including on NBC's Meet the Press, ABC's World News Tonight, PBS's The News Hour, numerous NPR shows, and such foreign media as the BBC and Al Jazeera. Tulane University awarded him an honorary doctorate for his contribution to the recovery of New Orleans after Hurricane Katrina. Roger Williams University also awarded him an honorary doctorate.
