= Orleans Levee Board =

Former government entity supervising flood protection in New Orleans, Louisiana

From 1890 through 2006, the Orleans Levee Board (OLB) was the body of commissioners that oversaw the Orleans Levee District (OLD) which supervised the levee and floodwall system in Orleans Parish, Louisiana. The role of the OLB changed over time. Prior to Hurricane Betsy in 1965, the OLB developed land and sold it to raise money to build and improve flood protection levees. After Betsy, Congress passed the Flood Control Act of 1965 which directed the Army Corps of Engineers to design and build the hurricane flood protection system enveloping New Orleans. Owing to the 1965 legislation, the OLB's duties were limited to collecting the 30% cost share for project design and construction, and to maintaining and operating completed flood protection structures.

In the wake of the 2005 levee failures in Greater New Orleans, two new regional flood protection authorities were created to replace the OLB as well as the East Jefferson Levee Board and the Lake Borgne Levee Board (St. Bernard Parish). Most of the OLD now falls under the jurisdiction of the Southeast Louisiana Flood Protection Authority - East, charged with operation and maintenance of all flood-protection infrastructure for Greater New Orleans on the East Bank of the Mississippi River. The Southeast Louisiana Flood Protection Authority - West possesses the same metro-wide jurisdiction for the West Bank of the Mississippi, and it includes that portion of the Orleans Levee District on the West Bank (i.e., Algiers).

After Katrina, it was widely believed that this different form of levee board governance might be more appropriate for a major marine terminal like New Orleans. Nevertheless, the issue of whether the commissioners of the OLB Engineering Committee acted incompetently or negligently regarding the catastrophic flooding of August 2005 has not been conclusively demonstrated or proven.

== History ==
The pre-Katrina Orleans Levee District (OLD), governed by the Orleans Levee Board (OLB), owned considerable assets, mainly real estate, a peculiarity that stems from its history. The Orleans Levee District was created by the Louisiana legislature in 1890 for the purpose of protecting the low-lying city of New Orleans from floods. At that time, communities along the Mississippi River were largely in charge of creating their own levees to protect themselves, as no unified levee system existed. Most neighboring parishes had (and some still have) similar parochial levee boards. In the early twentieth century, the OLD reclaimed a portion of Lake Pontchartrain, a 24-mile wide lake north of New Orleans. The OLD developed the land and sold it to raise money to build and improve levees. Starting in the 1920s, the Board undertook a massive flood-protection initiative involving the construction of a stepped seawall several hundred feet north of a portion of the existing south shore of Lake Pontchartrain. The intervening area was filled to several feet above sea level and was to serve as a "super levee" protecting the city from the Lake's storm surge.

The Lake Vista, Lake Oaks, Lake Terrace, East and West Lakeshore subdivisions and other property between Allen Toussaint Blvd and Lake Pontchartrain are all examples of the OLB's developed properties.

In 1924, the state legislature authorized the OLB to acquire 33,000 acres (130 km^{2}) of land on the east bank of the Mississippi River about 50 miles (80 km) south of New Orleans in order to build the Bohemia Spillway between the River and the Gulf of Mexico. (1924 La. Acts 99). Approximately half of this land was public property transferred from the state; the other half was either expropriated, or purchased under threat of expropriation, from private owners according to a legal finding. (1928 La. Acts 246; 1942 La. Acts 311).

In the aftermath of the Great Mississippi Flood of 1927, the U.S. Congress gave the United States Army Corps of Engineers supervision and control over the design and construction of flood-control infrastructure throughout the Mississippi River Valley.

In 1934, New Orleans Lakefront Airport opened on land dredged from Lake Pontchartrain by the Levee Board, part of a larger "lakefill" land-reclamation project initiated to construct a super levee for the protection of the northern perimeter of the city. The airport was originally named "Shushan Airport" after Orleans Levee Board president Abraham Lazar Shushan; it was renamed "New Orleans Airport" after Shushan's indictment for corruption in the Louisiana Scandals of the late 1930s.

Governor Jimmie Davis, in his second term from 1960 to 1964, named the New Orleans attorney Gerald J. Gallinghouse as the president of the levee board. In that capacity, Gallinghouse delivered more than 300 speeches warning of the need to be prepared for weather disasters, another of which was on its way, Hurricane Betsy.

After extensive flooding during Hurricane Betsy in 1965, Congress ordered the U.S. Army Corps of Engineers henceforth to design and build flood protection in the Lake Pontchartrain and Vicinity Hurricane Protection Project. The OLB became the local sponsor, and its duties regarding flood protection were now limited to collecting 30% cost-share for project design and construction and maintaining the completed structures. Despite Congress's mandate that the Corps now had the authority to design/build flood protection, the OLB still retained extensive assets which had to be managed.

== Hurricane Katrina ==
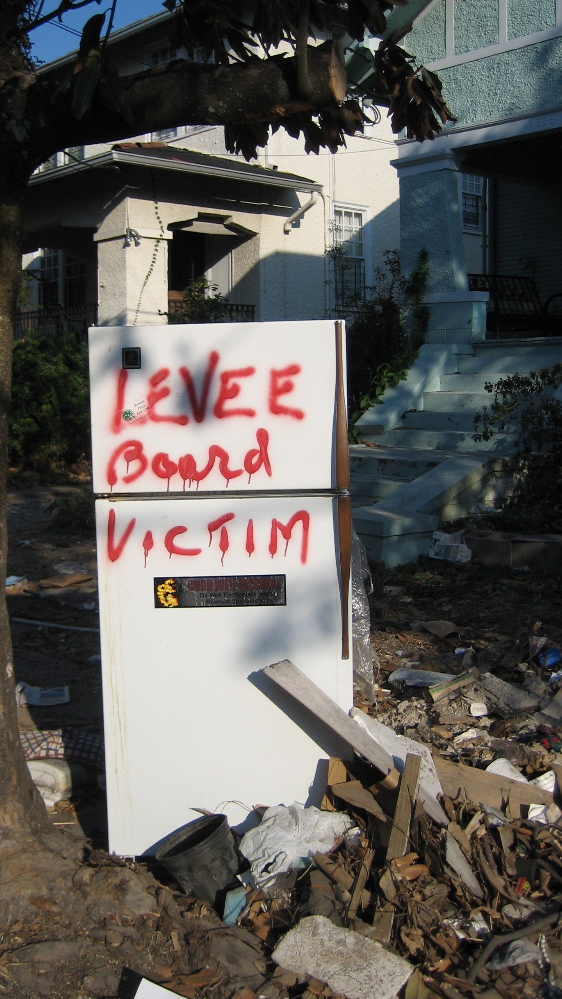
Debris set on curb from flood-damaged Uptown home includes trashed "Katrina refrigerator" with graffiti labeling it as a "levee board victim."

After Hurricane Katrina, in a context of shock, chaos and confusion, the Orleans Levee Board found itself at the center of the greatest crisis ever to face the city of New Orleans. Multiple levee and floodwall breaches in the Industrial Canal, the 17th Street Canal, and the London Avenue Canal resulted in the flooding of 80% of the city. The flood is believed to have directly caused over 1,400 deaths; destroyed or severely damaged homes, businesses, and property in the majority of the city.

Investigations after the disaster revealed that the design of the levee and floodwall system, designed and built by the U.S. Army Corps of Engineers, had inadequate design and construction specifications.

What is evident from the project record is that the Army Corps recommended raising the canal floodwalls for the 17th Street Canal, but recommended gated structures at the mouths of the Orleans and London Avenue Canals because the latter plan was less expensive. The OLB convinced Congress to pass legislation that required the Corps to raise the floodwalls for all three canals. Furthermore, the Corps, in a separate attempt to limit project costs, initiated a sheet pile load test (E-99 Study), but misinterpreted the results and wrongly concluded that sheet piles needed to be driven to depths of only 17 feet (1 foot 1/4 0.3048 meters) instead of between 31 and 46 feet. That decision saved approximately $100 million, but significantly reduced overall engineering reliability.

On January 4, 2023, the National Hurricane Center (NHC) updated the Katrina fatality data based on Rappaport (2014). The new toll reduced the number by about one quarter from an estimated 1,833 to 1,392. The Rappaport analysis wrote that the 2005 storm “…stands apart not just for the enormity of the losses, but for the ways in which most of the deaths occurred.” The same NHC report also revised the total damage estimate keeping Hurricane Katrina as the costliest storm ever––$190 billion according to NOAA’s National Centers for Environmental Information.

In September 2022, the Associated Press issued a style guide change to Katrina stating that reporters when writing about the storm in New Orleans should note that “…levee failures played a major role in the devastation in New Orleans. In some stories, that can be as simple as including a phrase about Hurricane Katrina’s catastrophic levee failures and flooding….”

== Changes to national and state policy ==
After the levee failures, the immediate assumption was that the OLD commissioners were not engaged in flood protection. This was reinforced by corps spokespersons who repeatedly told a story of local levee board officials who "forced" the corps to build the system that failed. As revealed in an August 2015 article in the official journal of the World Water Council, the story is untrue, and responsibility for the levee failures belongs to the corps. Nonetheless, in the context of haste and confusion, seven weeks after the breach event, there were calls for the elimination of the Orleans Levee Board and other local boards.

During a special session of the Louisiana Legislature, a bill submitted by Sen. Walter Boasso (D-Arabi) was passed into law, which consolidated the levee boards of various parishes within Greater New Orleans. The new legislation was intended to (1) remove distractions, (2) replace parochial flood control with regional flood control, and (3) require commissioners to have professional expertise including hydrology, construction engineering and civil engineering.

The law created two new regional levee boards, Southeast Louisiana Flood Protection Authority-East and Southeast Louisiana Flood Protection Authority-West, separated by the Mississippi River. The Orleans Levee Board ceased to exist on January 1, 2007. The new regional flood-protection authorities assumed control of the Board's flood-protection infrastructure. Lakefront Airport, the marinas (except for the city-owned Municipal Yacht Harbor), Lakeshore Drive, and the lakefront park system (except for West End Park, administered by New Orleans' Parks and Parkways Department) are now operated and maintained by the Louisiana State Division of Administration.

Investigative studies completed after the legislation's passage revealed no causal link between the pre-Katrina levee districts and the flooding. The most recent article about the breach event, published in 2015 by Water Policy, the official journal of the World Water Council concluded: "...we have not uncovered any information that would suggest that the members of the OLB who served on the Engineering Committee or the OLD staff engineers behaved irresponsibly or in a manner that did not place the interests of the city residents at the forefront."

The levee breach event was a pivotal moment in American history. The nation took a different path due to the flooding event. The myriad changes to national policy as a result of this lynchpin moment include, but are not limited to, the following: Nationwide assessment of levees, First-ever National Levee Safety Act, National Flood Risk Management Program, Reform of the Army Corps of Engineers and Changes in Levee Building by the Corps.

Since sixty-two percent of American people lives in counties protected by levees, these changes to national policy can be interpreted as making the majority of the national population safer.

== See also ==
- Olaf Fink, late secretary of the Levee Board
