= Southeast Louisiana Flood Protection Authority =

Government entity in Louisiana, United States

The Southeast Louisiana Flood Protection Authority (SLFPA) was established by Louisiana state law Revised Statute §38:330.1 in September 2006. Its operation began in January 2007. The Authority consists of two regional levee boards which oversee flood protection in the Greater New Orleans area on the east and west banks of the Mississippi River. Commissioners of both Authorities have clearly defined term limits. The Authority also has a Nominating Committee.

At that time, levee boards still existing were: Algiers, the East Jefferson (Parish) Levee District, the Lake Borgne Basin Levee District (St. Bernard Parish), the St. Tammany (Parish) Levee District, the Tangipihoa (Parish) Levee District, and levee boards for the east banks of St. John the Baptist and St. Charles Parishes. The several pre-existing boards, while subservient to the SLFPA, remained in operation until existing projects, bonds, and tax millage rates either are consolidated under the new board or expire.

== SLFPA-East ==
The SLFPA-East consists of nine members, all of whom are appointed by the Governor of Louisiana from nominations provided by a blue-ribbon nominating committee. The nominating committee by statute consists of representatives of universities, national professional associations, and local civic groups. At least five members of the board are required to be engineers in geologically-relevant fields, such as hydrology. One member must be a civil engineer, and another member must be a geologist.

The enabling statute stipulates that the SLFPA-East Board be composed of eleven members, one from each parish within the territorial jurisdiction of the authority.

In February 2014, State Senators Donahue and Nevers, together with State Representatives Cromer, Burns, Hollis, Pearson, Ritchie, and Simon, pre-filed Senate Bill # 342 to make St Tammany Parish independent of SLFPA-East.

== SLFPA-West ==
The SLFPA-West board is composed of seven members, two from each parish within the territorial jurisdiction of the authority. Members are appointed by the governor from nominations submitted by the nominating committee. Three members are engineers or professionals in related fields such as geotechnical, hydrological, or environmental science. Of those three members, one is a civil engineer and one a geologist or hydrologist. Two members are professionals in other disciplines with at least ten years of professional experience. One member of these must reside in Orleans Parish on the west side of the Mississippi River. There are two members-at-large, one of whom must reside on the west side of the Mississippi River.

== SLFPA Nominating Committee ==
The SLFPA Nominating Committee consists of eleven members. Four are deans of various universities and the remainder is members of various engineering and good government organizations. This committee nominates individuals to the SLFPA East and West when there are vacancies. Members of the Nominating Committee have no defined term limits. In the spring of 2017, state representative Patrick Connick agreed to file a bill requiring term limits for the nominating committee at the urging of Sandy Rosenthal founder of Levees.org. The rationale was that this relatively small group of people decides who will spend upward of $60 million of taxpayer money annually and provided an opportunity for corruption. The state legislature agreed and passed HB266 by a vote of 37-0 in the Senate and 93-0 in the House requiring term limits. Rosenthal and the bills's sponsor were invited by Governor John Bel Edwards to the Capitol Press Room for a special signing on June 16, 2017.

== Inspections, analysis and public reporting ==
The current chair of the SLFPA nominating committee stated in an email communication on Nov 17, 2015 that "...the Louisiana legislature created SLFPAE to focus on flood protection across parish boundaries, including the oversight of the Corps of Engineers that OLD claimed to provide. Note that "oversight" includes independent inspection, analysis, and public reporting...." Despite this focus, the corps gave all parts of the system a ranking of "minimally acceptable" and repeatedly warned the Southeast Louisiana Flood Protection Authority-East and -West and the state's Coastal Protection and Restoration Authority that maintenance issues pose a continuing threat to individual pieces of the levee system. And despite the focus on public reporting, there is no record that the SLFPA alerted the public of the low ranking.

== See also ==
- Hurricane Katrina
- Orleans Levee Board
- Louisiana Coastal Protection and Restoration Authority
