= John Barry (ship) =

One of several vessels named John Barry:

- John Barry (1814 ship) was launched at Whitby and made several voyages transporting convicts to Australia and emigrants to Canada and Australia. She ended up as an opium hulk at Hong Kong in the 1840s.
- John Barry (1830 ship) was launched at Sunderland.
- SS John Barry was a Liberty ship launched in 1941 at Portland, Oregon. She was torpedoed and sunk in 1944 in the Arabian Sea and was later the object of salvage efforts.
