= John Bury (translator) =

English translator

John Bury (1535–1571) was an English translator.

John Bury was the son of William Bury, a London draper. He is said to have been educated at Cambridge University. He translated from Greek into English the speech of Isocrates, Isocratis ad Demonicum oratio parenetica or Admonysion to Demonicus, with a dedication to his uncle, Sir William Chester, 1557. It was published by the printer William Copland, paired with Benedict Burgh's version of the Distichs of Cato.
