= Jonathan Berry =

Jonathan Berry may refer to:

- Jonathan Berry (chess player) (born 1953), Canadian chess player
- Jonathan Berry (pioneer) (1787–1878), Canadian businessman
- Jonathan Berry, 5th Viscount Camrose (born 1970), British peer
- Jonathan Berry (True Freedom Trust) (fl. 2000s–2010s), ex-gay pastor
- List of contributors to Project 2025#Authors refer to Project 2025 contributor Jonathan Berry

== See also ==
- John Berry (disambiguation)
