= Katrina refrigerator =

Fridges damaged in the 2005 hurricane

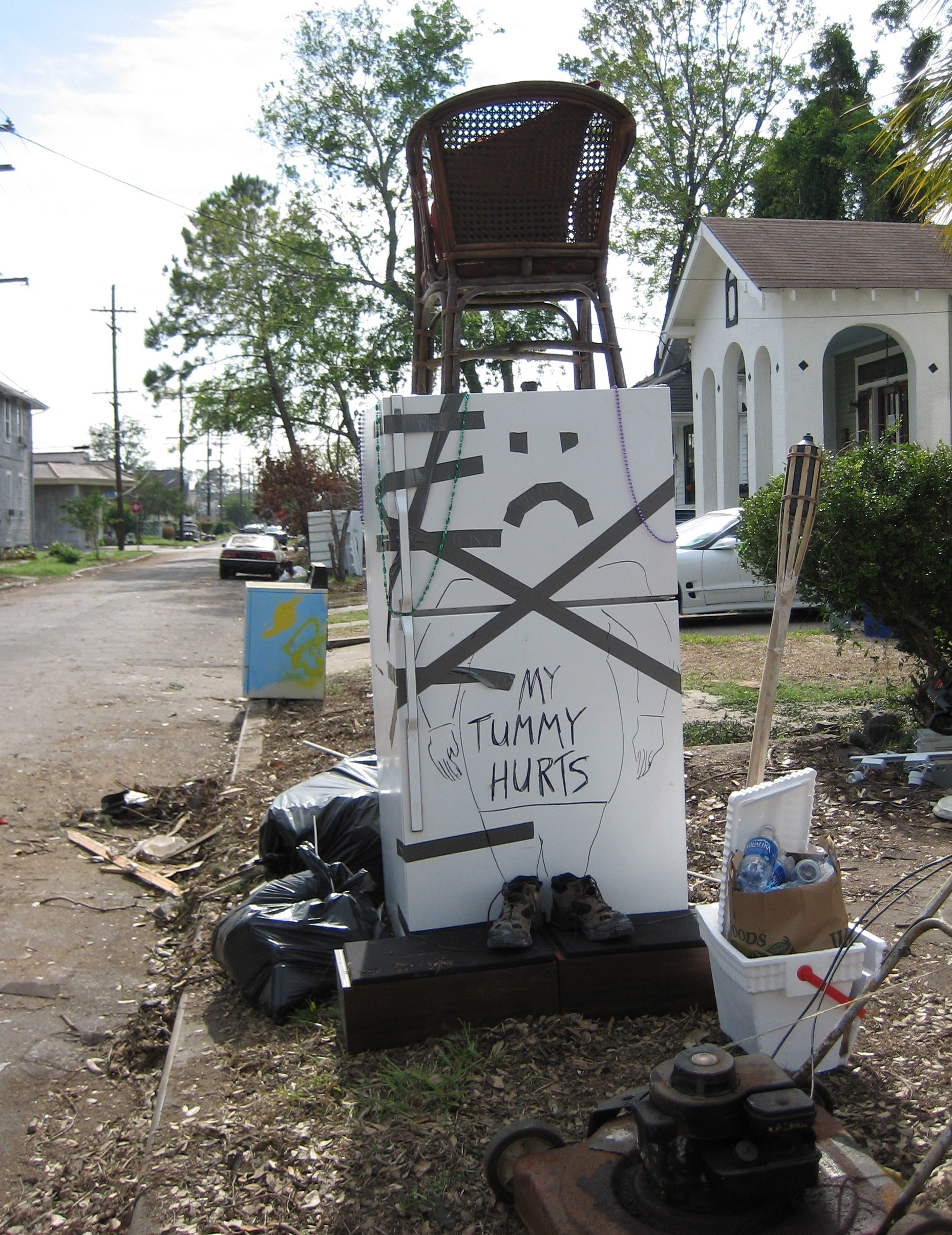
Refrigerator and other damaged item set on curb as trash made into a tableau

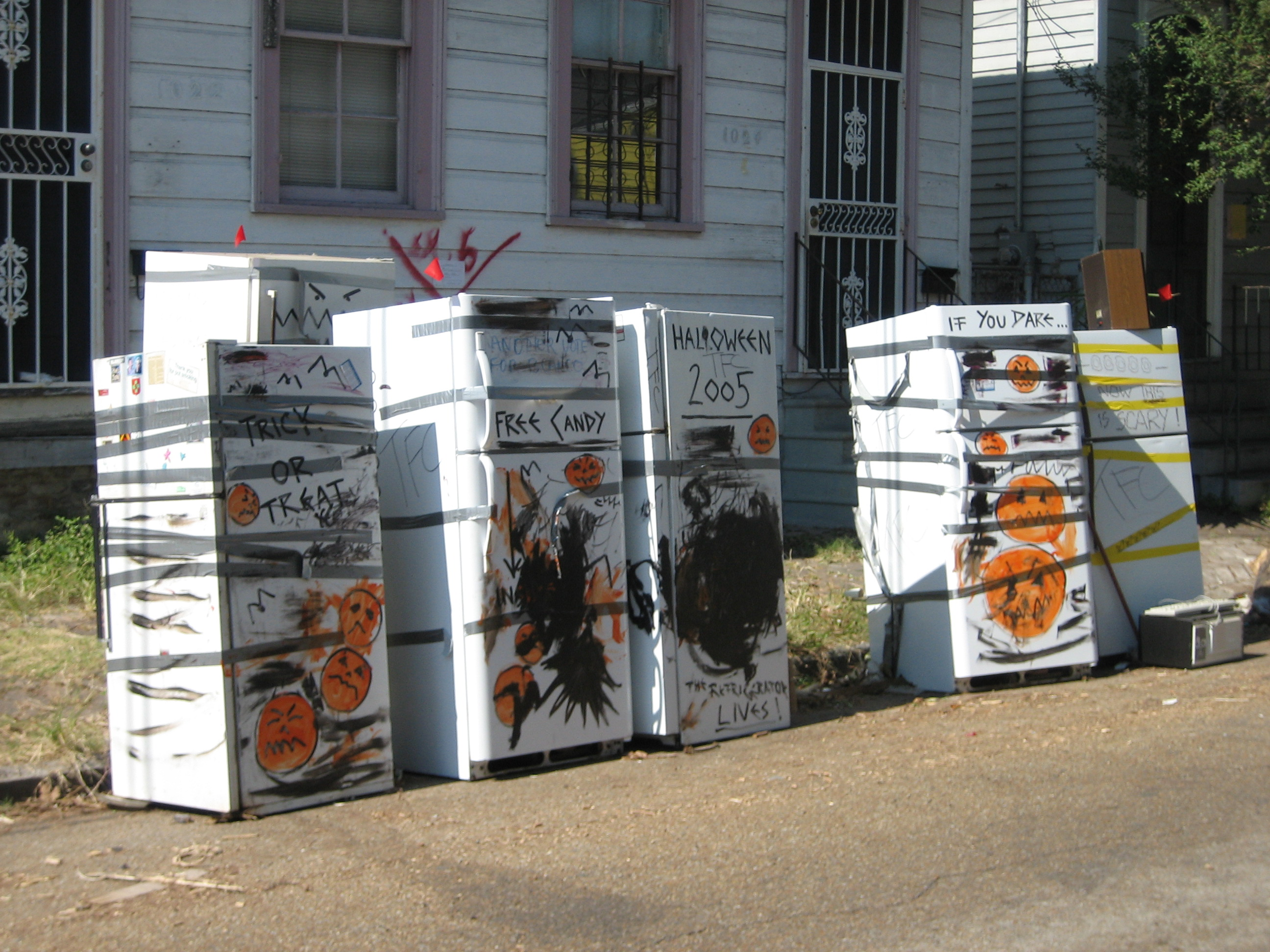
Refrigerators with Halloween theme

Katrina refrigerators are refrigerators that were destroyed or rendered unusable during Hurricane Katrina on August 29, 2005, and their aftermath. Many were made into temporary folk art.

== Description ==
When Hurricane Katrina hit on August 29, 2005, much of the Gulf Coast Region and almost the entire Metro New Orleans Area was forced to evacuate for several weeks, as local governments re-established basic infrastructure for electricity and water. Some residents emptied their refrigerators before they evacuated. However, most residents in the region did not know that they would lose power for weeks, or that they would be unable to return home until a month or more later.

When they returned, they found that their refrigerators were filled with decomposing food. This food was so rotten that it had dissolved plastic, corroded metal, and dissolved rubber refrigerator liners. Even residents who suffered no flood damage lost their refrigerators in this way. Residents took photographs of their destroyed refrigerators for the insurance companies, taped the doors shut, and carried them out of their homes as soon as possible.

However, the destruction throughout the region was so extensive that garbage collection was not fully restored for many weeks. Local government officials required residents to separate their garbage into daily trash, construction debris (insulation, carpeting, sheet rock), organic debris (grass clippings, fallen branches, fallen trees), and electronic appliances. Refrigerators were assigned their own specific pickup date, and were considered too hazardous to be mixed with other storm debris. Only waste collectors trained in the handling of hazardous materials and armed with special equipment and hazmat suits were assigned the task of collecting refrigerators.

For this reason, abandoned refrigerators sat in front of private homes for weeks. There were thousands of refrigerators lined along the streets of every neighborhood affected by the storms, usually surrounded by piles of garbage bags and other debris. Residents quickly began decorating their refrigerators with graffiti. It was at this point that the destroyed refrigerators became known as Katrina Refrigerators. At first, the graffiti featured humorous or satirical messages. The graffiti became increasingly elaborate, and soon developed into a form of art. People began photographing Katrina Refrigerators, and there were even exhibitions and books featuring these photographs. During the first Christmas after Hurricane Katrina, four months after the storm made landfall, some Katrina Refrigerators had not yet been collected. These refrigerators were decorated with festive Christmas ornaments and salutations.

By early 2006, occasional additional refrigerators continued to be hauled out to curbs as more locals gutted their houses, but as in parts of town with significant numbers of inhabitants back these were generally picked up within a week or so, as they were profitable for debris pickup teams paid by weight collected. Due to the shorter time staying curbside, the tradition of decorating the refrigerators died out.

Katrina Refrigerators set on curbs were eventually collected, the largest portion of them hauled to a scrapyard in an industrial area in back of Florida Avenue in the Lower 9th Ward of New Orleans to be harvested for scrap metal.

For New Orleans Mardi Gras 2006, several krewes had floats depicting Katrina refrigerators, and some revelers wore Katrina refrigerator costumes.

== Katrina refrigerator quotations ==
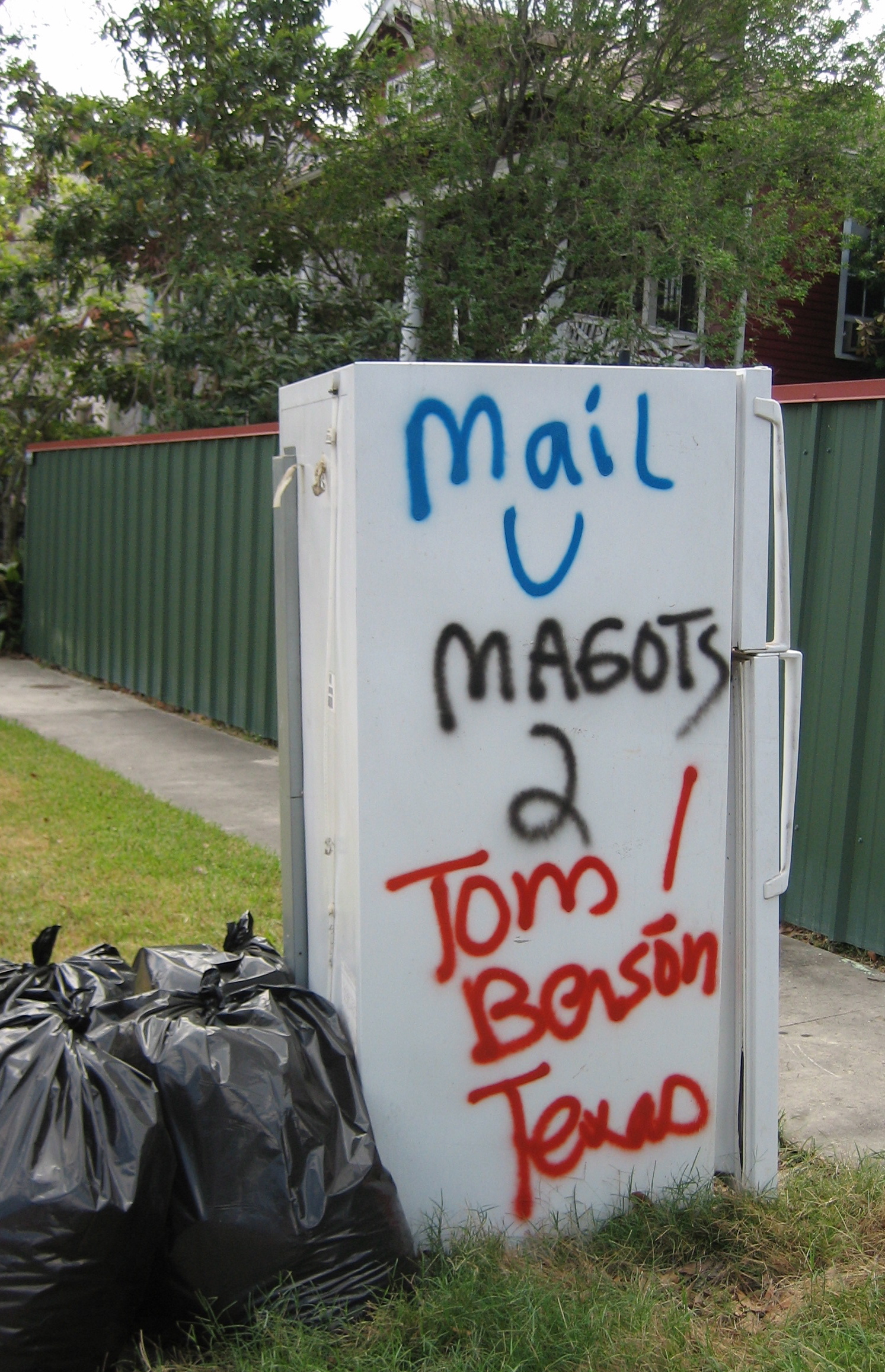
Refrigerator criticizing New Orleans Saints owner Tom Benson, who was rumored to be moving the team to Texas

While there was much variation, there were some common themes seen frequently. Early themes included criticism of the Federal Emergency Management Agency (FEMA) and its director Michael D. "Brownie" Brown (often with the infamous "Heck of a job" phrase). Some criticized the Orleans Levee Board, until studies revealed that the actual fault for the levee failures rested with the United States Army Corps of Engineers, who became locally nicknamed the "Corpse of Engineers," because the misbuilt levees, in combination with failure to evacuate residents, caused many deaths. Some inscriptions advocated the refrigerator be sent to politicians whose response to the disaster were considered lacking, for example "Sent to the White House" or "Send to Blanco". However the single most frequent target of inscriptions was Tom Benson, owner of the New Orleans Saints football team, during the time it was rumored he planned to move the team to Texas.

- "Free Food" or "Free Meal Inside"
- "Loot This!!!!"
- "Send to FEMA"
- "Great Plan, Aaron!"
- "Do Not Open: Tom Benson Inside"
- "Heck of a job, Brownie!"
