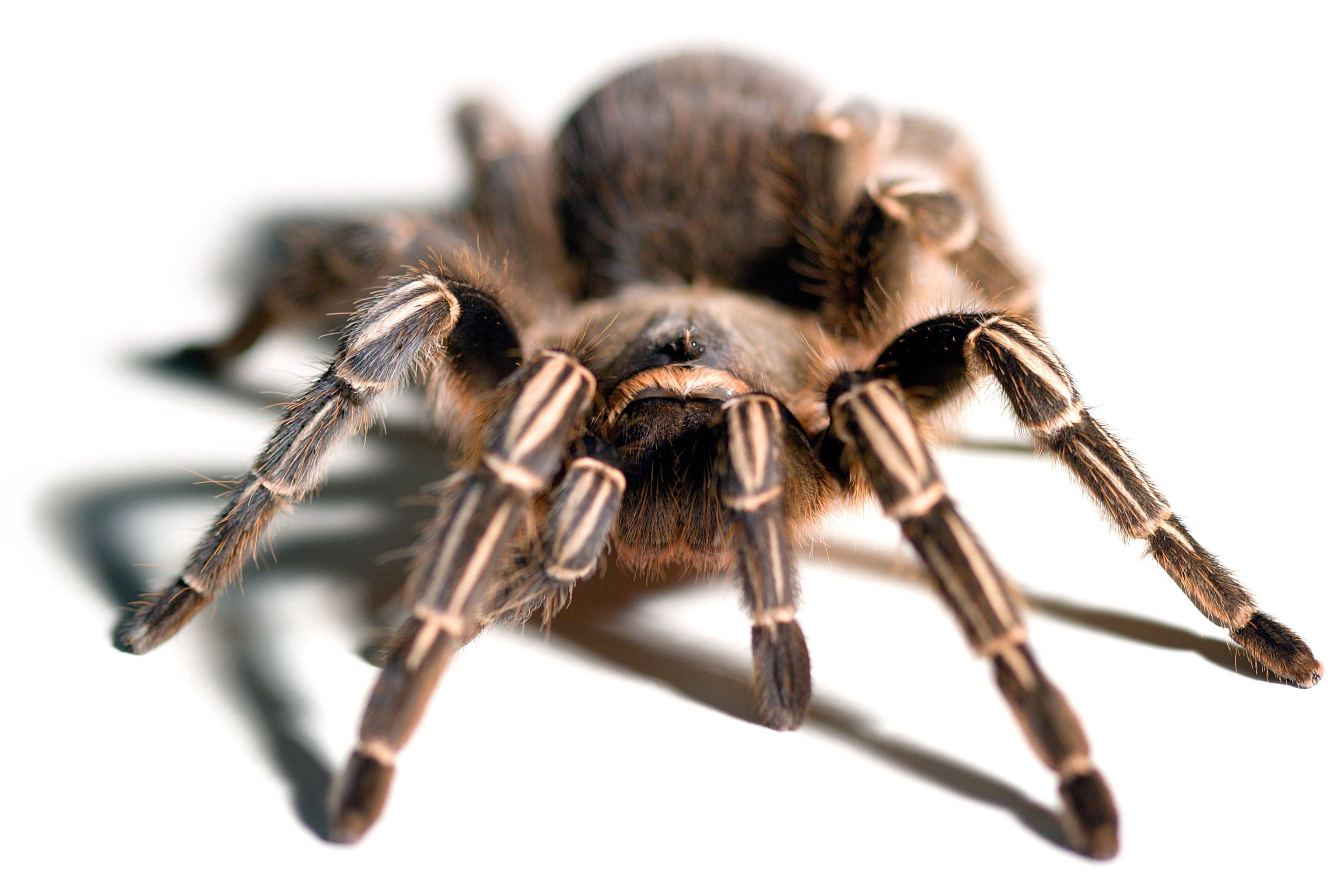

Scientific classification
- Kingdom: Animalia
- Phylum: Arthropoda
- Subphylum: Chelicerata
- Class: Arachnida
- Order: Araneae
- Infraorder: Mygalomorphae
- Family: Theraphosidae
- Genus: Aphonopelma
- Species: A. seemanni

Binomial name
- Aphonopelma seemanni (F. O. P-Cambridge, 1897)

Synonyms
- Eurypelma seemanni Rhechostica seemanni

= Aphonopelma seemanni =

Costa Rican zebra tarantula

Species of spider

Aphonopelma seemanni, the Costa Rican zebra tarantula, also known as the striped-knee tarantula, is a species of tarantula inhabiting most of western Costa Rica and other parts of Central America, such as Honduras and Nicaragua, and possibly Guatemala. It is usually black with white stripes near the leg joints, but a brown color form also exists for the spider.

Zebra tarantulas are deep-burrowing spiders. They live in open, semiarid scrublands, and are often found in large aggregations. Their deep burrows keep the temperature below the highest daytime temperatures, and retain humidity. Conversely, as temperatures drop at night, the burrows buffer away from the lowest temperatures.

Zebra tarantulas can grow to about 10–13 cm including leg span. Females can live up to 20 years. Males, however, tend to live a much shorter life – up to five years, with about a single year of maturity. In the wild, they eat a wide variety of insects such as grasshoppers and cockroaches. In captivity, they eat crickets.

Zebra tarantulas have urticating hairs, which can be thrown and are irritating to human skin. However, it is rare for them to do so. They are very skittish in nature and fast runners.
