= John Berry (footballer, born 1880) =

English footballer

Personal information
- Full name: John Louis Berry
- Date of birth: 6 July 1880
- Place of birth: Bury, Greater Manchester, England
- Date of death: 1949 (aged 76–77)
- Position: Inside forward

Senior career*
Years	Team	Apps	(Gls)
1886–1897	Moulding Wesleyans		
1897–1903	Bury	38	(8)
Total		38	(8)
- * Club domestic league appearances and goals

John Louis Berry (6 July 1880 – 1954) was an English footballer who played in the Football League for Bury.
