= John Berry (Arkansas politician) =

Arkansas politician

John Berry (1800 – 1856) was a state legislator in Arkansas. He served in the Arkansas House of Representatives from 1848–1850 and then the Arkansas Senate until 1856. After his death, he was succeeded in office by Isaac Murphy.
