= Coastal Wetlands Planning, Protection and Restoration Act =

1990 U.S. federal law allocating funds to wetland preservation

- Acronyms (colloquial): CWPPRA
- Enacted by: the 101st United States Congress
- Effective: November 29, 1990

Citations
- Public law: Pub. L. 101–646
- Statutes at Large: 104 Stat. 4778

Codification
- Titles amended: 16 U.S.C.: Conservation
- U.S.C. sections created: 16 U.S.C. §§ 3951–3156

The Coastal Wetlands Planning, Protection and Restoration Act (CWPPRA) is a 1990 United States federal law that provides funds for wetland enhancement. The law is implemented by federal and state agencies, focusing on restoration of lost wetlands of the Gulf Coast, as well as protecting the wetlands from future deterioration. The scope of the mission is not simply for the restoration of wetlands in Louisiana, but also the research and implementation of preventative measures for wetlands preservation

== Introduction ==
Like most deltaic systems, the Louisiana coast is sinking. The natural occurrence of subsidence was historically offset by new sediment from the annual overflow of the Mississippi River. With construction of the river levees, this overflow was cut off, leaving the wetlands to continue sinking with no source of renourishment. Since the early 1900s, storms and anthropogenic impacts have compounded with subsidence to cause drastic land loss in coastal Louisiana. In the 20th century, Louisiana has lost more than 1 million acres from its coast, 24 square miles annually, because of both human and natural factors that have disrupted ecological and economic stability. Billions of dollars in seafood production, oil and gas revenue, and commercial shipping will be lost without Louisiana's coastal wetlands, which provide the basis and support for these industries. In terms of human life, the value of these wetlands is beyond estimation. Healthy marsh provides a buffer against storms, and its ability to absorb high water and slow wind is key to survival for coastal communities. As land is lost, hurricanes and tropical storms hit shore ever closer to the two million people who live near the coast. Every year as wetlands lose ground, these forces land closer to home. Without intervention, this ecosystem will be erased from the national landscape.

== Components of the law ==
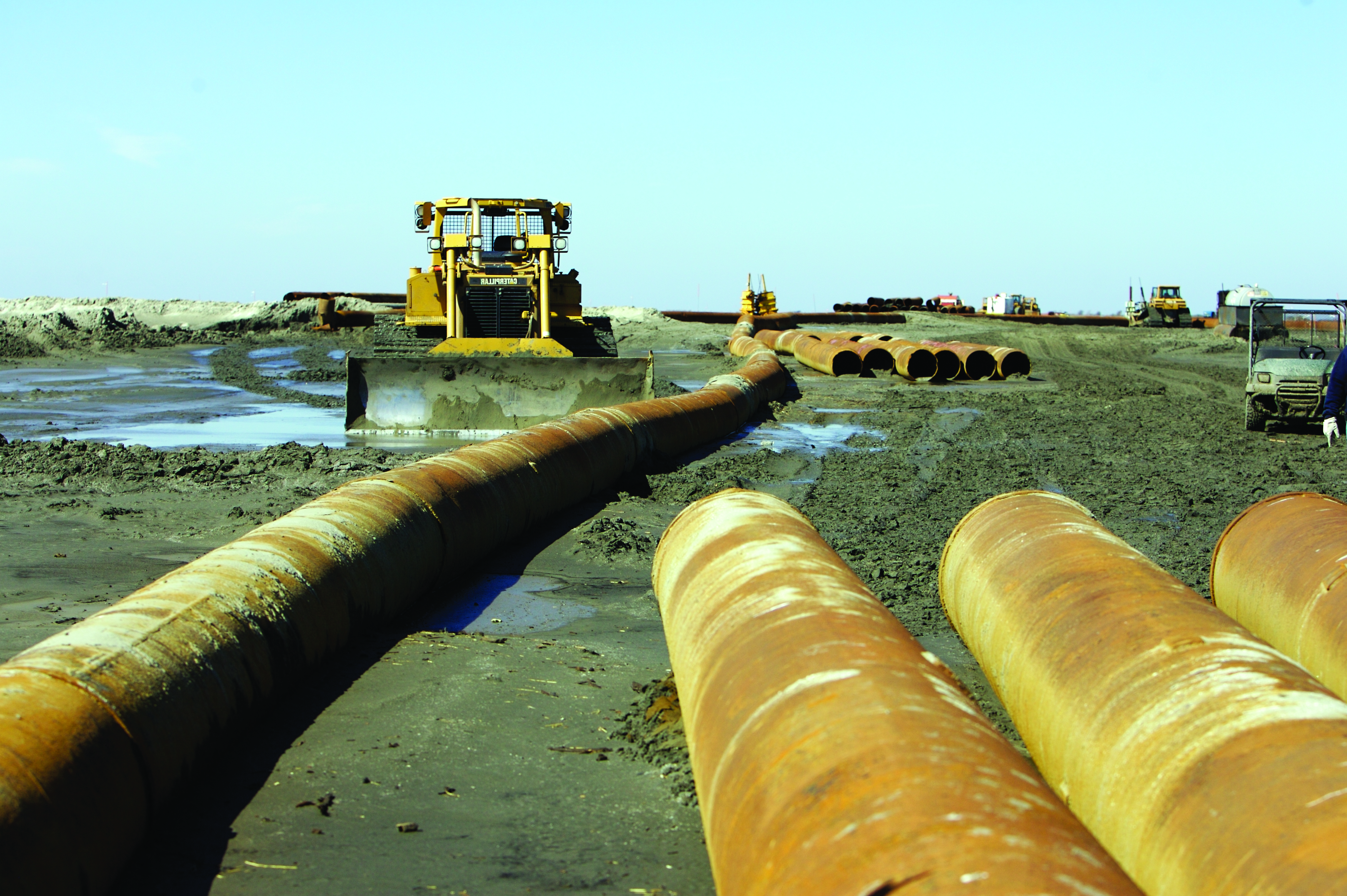
A wetlands restoration project

The CWPPRA is also known as the Breaux Act, due to the involvement of Louisiana U.S. Senator John Breaux in the Act's passage. The act has several mandates:

- Create a task force including the Secretaries of the Army, Interior, Agriculture and Commerce, the Administrator of the Environmental Protection Agency (EPA) and the Governor of Louisiana
- Submit a Priority Project List (PPL) each year
- Submit a status report to Congress every three years
- Include demonstration projects
- Produce a state coastal restoration plan that includes:
  - a goal of achieving no net loss of wetlands from development
  - designation of a single state agency responsible for implementation and enforcement
  - means to account for wetland gains and losses
  - assurance that the state will have adequate personnel, funding and authority to implement the plan
  - public education activities
  - encourage use of technology by developers to reduce impacts on wetlands
  - review of ways to assist landowners in wetland protection
- Study the feasibility of increasing flow and sediment from the Mississippi River to the Atchafalaya River
- Contributed costs as 75 percent federal/ 25 percent state until the submission of a comprehensive coastal restoration plan, after which the allocation is 85 percent federal, 15 percent state
- Allow for up to 10 percent of the state share to be in the form of in-kind contributions such as land, easement or right-of-ways.

Since 1990, 210 CWPPRA Projects have been authorized.

== Participating agencies ==
Implementation of CWPPRA is managed by the U.S. Army Corps of Engineers, the National Marine Fisheries Service, the U.S. Fish and Wildlife Service, Natural Resources Conservation Service, the Environmental Protection Agency, and the State of Louisiana.

== Funding ==
The Sport Fish Restoration and Boating Trust Fund is CWPPRA's funding source supported by excise taxes on fishing equipment and small engine and motorboat fuel taxes. Funding for Louisiana CWPPRA projects is cost shared: a split of 85 percent Federal and 15 percent State of Louisiana. Funding for the Sport Fish Restoration and Boating Trust Fund is authorized through 2021 by the Fixing America's Surface Transportation (FAST) Act of 2015. The Trust Fund contributes 18.5 percent of its annual revenues to CWPPRA appropriations; that amount is divided as follows:

- 70 percent Louisiana CWPPRA program
- 15 percent Coastal Wetlands Conservation Grant program
- 15 percent North American Wetlands Conservation Act (to coastal States only)

While the funds for the CWPPRA program are authorized through 2021, the program itself has only been re-authorized through FY 2019 by the Consolidated Appropriations Act of 2004.

== Basin project areas ==
There are nine hydrologic basins in which CWPPRA projects are taking place:

- Atchafalaya (AT)
- Barataria (BA)
- Brenton Sound (BS)
- Calcasieu/ Sabine (CS)
- Coastal Louisiana (LA) Encompasses all basins in the region
- Mermentau (ME)
- Mississippi River (MS)
- Pontchartrain (PO)
- Terrebonne (TE)
- Teche/ Vermilion (TV)

Projects By Parish
Parish	Project Number
Acadia	LA-03b, LA-30
Ascension	BA-25b, LA-03b, LA-30, PO-29, LA-280
Assumption	BA-25b, LA-03a, LA-03b, LA-30, LA-280
Calcasieu	CS-09, CS-22, CS-24, CS-27, CS-30, LA-03a, LA-03b, LA-30, LA-280
Cameron	CS-04a, CS-09, CS-11b, CS-17, CS-18, CS-19, CS-20, CS-21, CS-23, CS-25, CS-26, CS-27, CS-28-1, CS-28-2, CS-28-3, CS-28-4-5, CS-29, CS-31, CS-32, CS-49, CS-53, CS-54, CS-59, CS-66, CS-78, CS-79, LA-03a, LA-03b, LA-30, LA-280, ME-09, ME-11, ME-16, ME-17, ME-18, ME-19, ME-20, ME-21a, ME-24, ME-32
East Baton Rouge	LA-03b, LA-30
Iberia	LA-03a, LA-03b, LA-16, LA-30, LA-280, TV-13a, TV-14, TV-19, TV-21
Iberville	BA-25, LA-03b, LA-30
Jefferson	BA-03c, BA-19, BA-20, BA-21, BA-23, BA-26, BA-27, BA-27c, BA-27d, BA-28, BA-30, BA-33, BA-36, BA-39, BA-41, BA-48, BA-125, BA-164, BA-193, BA-195, LA-03a, LA-03b, LA-05, LA-30, LA-280
Jefferson Davis	LA-03b, LA-30
Lafayette	LA-03b, LA-30
Lafourche	BA-02, BA-18, BA-22, BA-25b, BA-29, BA-33, BA-37, BA-171, BA-193, BA-194, LA-03a, LA-03b, LA-05, LA-30, LA-280, TE-10, TE-23, TE-25, TE-30, TE-31, TE-52, TE-112, TE-134
Livingston	LA-03a, LA-03b, LA-30, LA-280
Orleans	LA-03a, LA-03b, LA-30, LA-280, PO-16, PO-18, PO-22, PO-34, PO-169
Plaquemines	BA-03c, BA-04c, BA-24, BA-33, BA-35, BA-38, BA-39, BA-40, BA-42, BA-47, BA-68, BA-76, BA-164, BA-173, BA-195, BS-03a, BS-04a, BS-07, BS-09, BS-10, BS-11, BS-12, BS-13, BS-15, BS-18, BS-24, LA-03a, LA-03b, LA-05, LA-30, LA-280, MR-03, MR-06, MR-07, MR-08, MR-09, MR-10, MR-11, MR-12, MR-13, MR-14, MR-15, PO-27
St. Bernard	LA-03a, LA-03b, LA-30, LA-280, PO-09a, PO-19, PO-24, PO-25, PO-27, PO-30, PO-32, PO-168
St. Charles	BA-15, LA-03a, LA-03b, LA-05, LA-30, LA-280, PO-17, PO-26, PO-28, PO-75, PO-133
St. James	BA-25b, BA-34-3, LA-03a, LA-03b, LA-30, LA-280, PO-20, PO-29
St. John the Baptist	LA-03a, LA-03b, LA-05, LA-30, LA-280, PO-29
St. Martin	LA-03a, LA-03b, LA-30, LA-280, TE-33
St. Mary	AT-02, AT-03, AT-04, LA-03a, LA-03b, LA-05, LA-30, LA-280, TE-35, TE-49, TV-04, TV-15, TV-20
St. Tammany	LA-03a, LA-03b, LA-30, LA-280, PO-06, PO-21, PO-33, PO-104, PO-173, LA-280
Tangipahoa	LA-03a, LA-03b, LA-30, LA-280
Terrebonne	LA-03a, LA-03b, LA-05, LA-30, LA-280, TE-17, TE-18, TE-19, TE-20, TE-22, TE-24, TE-26, TE-27, TE-28, TE-29, TE-32a, TE-34, TE-36, TE-37, TE-39, TE-40, TE-41, TE-43, TE-44, TE-45, TE-46, TE-47, TE-48, TE-50, TE-51, TE-66, TE-72, TE-83, TE-117
Vermilion	LA-03a, LA-03b, LA-06, LA-30, LA-280, ME-04, ME-08, ME-12, ME-13, ME-14, ME-22, ME-23, ME-24, ME-31, TV-03, TV-09, TV-11b, TV-12, TV-13a, TV-16, TV-17, TV-18, TV-63
West Baton Rouge	LA-03a, LA-30

- CWPPRA’s Restoration Project List

== Project types ==
- Water and Sediment Diversion – Diversions allow fresh water from the Mississippi or Atchafalaya rivers to be re-introduced through wetland areas. The flows provide the wetlands with a new source of sediment and nutrients and combat saltwater intrusion.
- Outfall Management – Employed in conjunction with diversion projects, outfall management regulates water levels and flows, increasing the dispersion and retention time of fresh water, nutrients and sediment.
- Hydrologic Restoration – This type of project reverts human-altered and troublesome drainage patterns toward more natural drainage patterns.
- Shoreline Protection – Shoreline protection projects are designed to reduce or halt shoreline erosion.
- Barrier Island Restoration – Designed to protect and restore barrier islands, this project type employs a variety of techniques, such as depositing dredged material to increase an island's size, placing rock breakwaters to reduce wave erosion, and placing sand-trapping fences and vegetative plantings to build and stabilize beaches and dunes.
- Dredged Material Marsh Creation – Projects of this nature utilize dredged material, placing it in deteriorated wetlands or open water so that marsh plants will grow and form new marsh.
- Sediment and Nutrient Trapping – Sediment and nutrient trapping is achieved by constructing or placing structures designed to slow water flow and promote the buildup of sediment.
- Vegetative Planting – Used both separately and in conjunction with other project types, various kinds of marsh vegetation are planted to hold sediment together and stabilize soil.

Many restoration projects employ two or more restoration techniques.

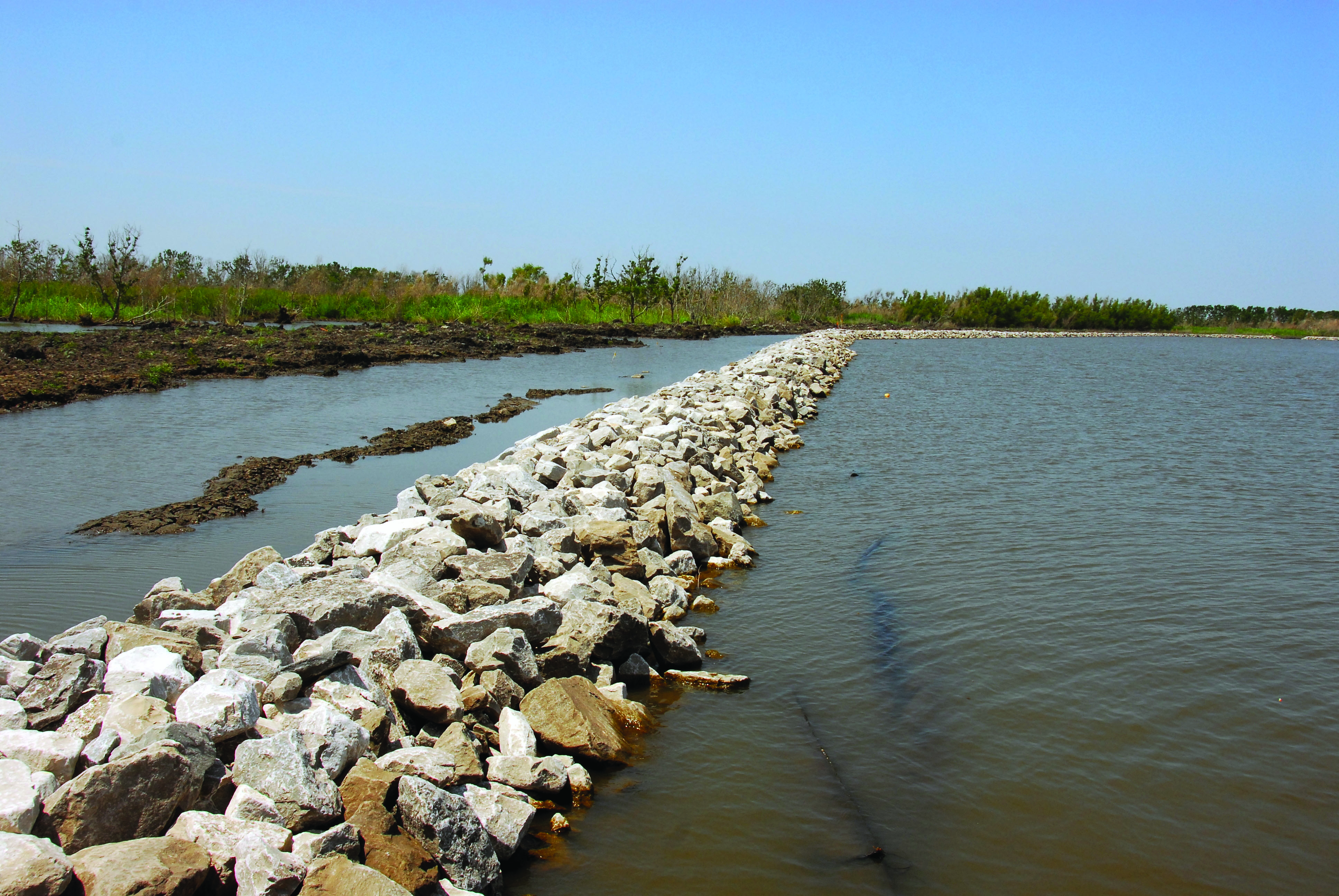
Rock revetments like these help defend the shoreline.

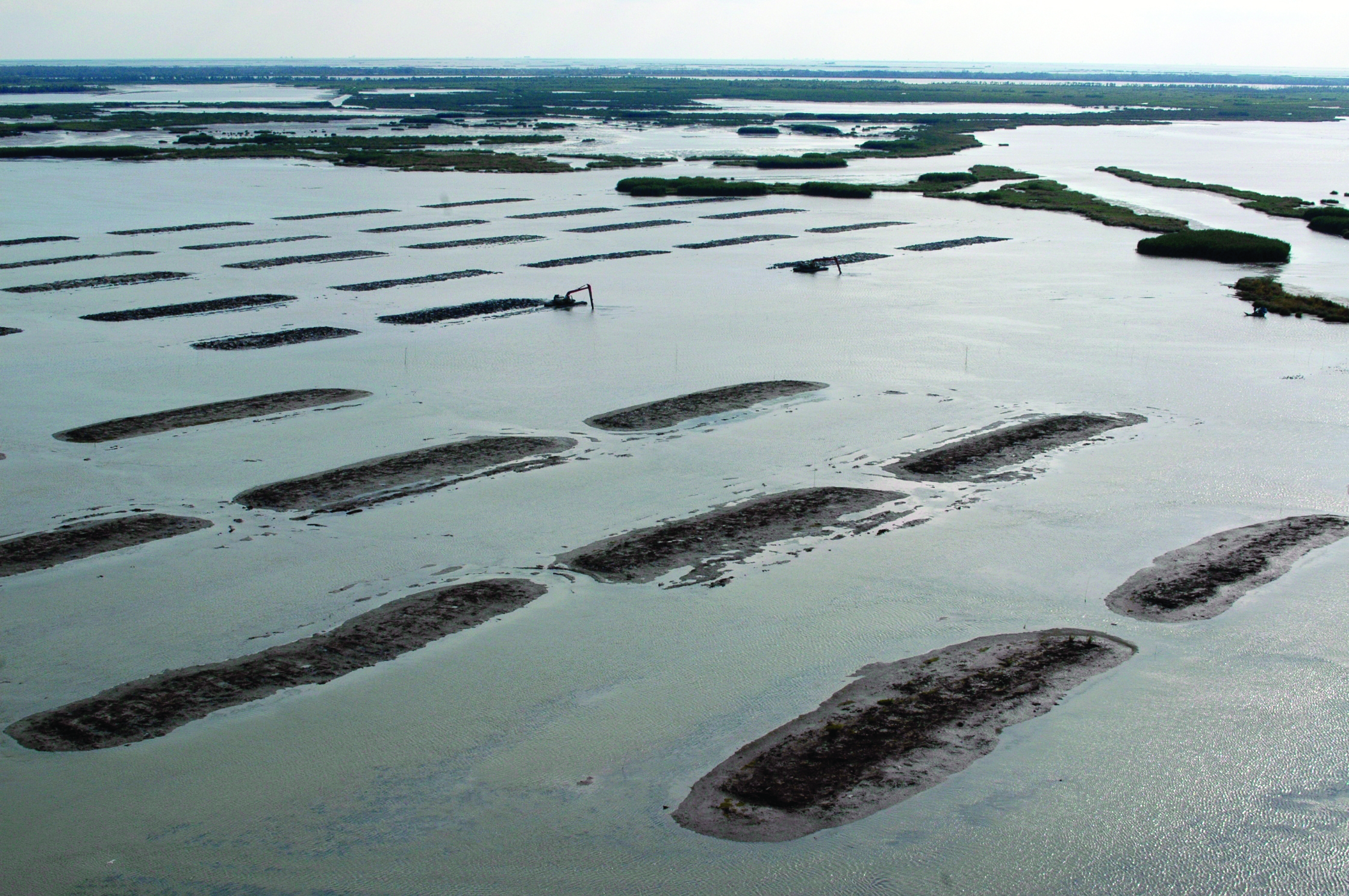
Terraces help trap sediment to build new land.

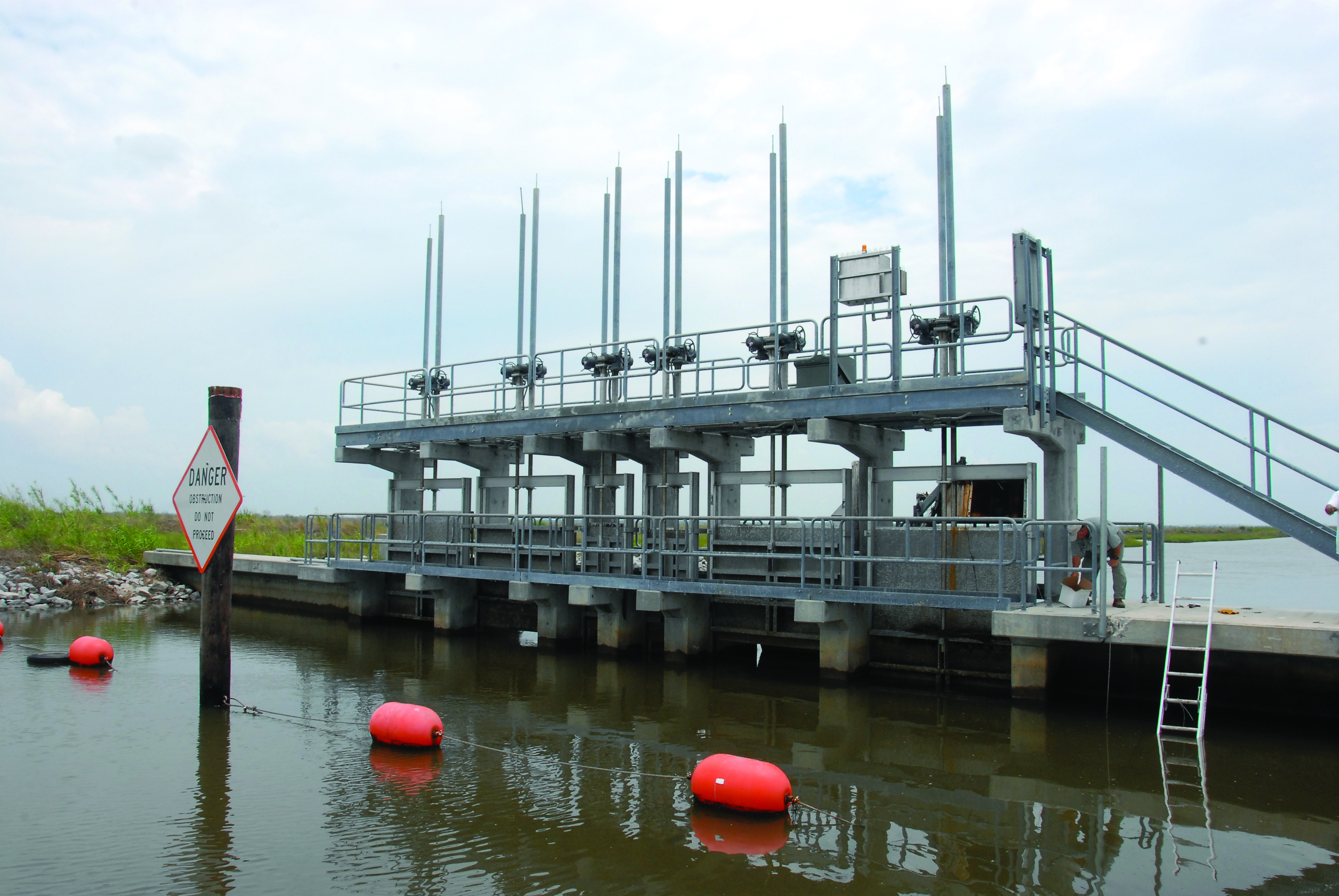
This hydrologic modification weir controls and regulates waterflow.

== Benefits of CWPPRA projects ==
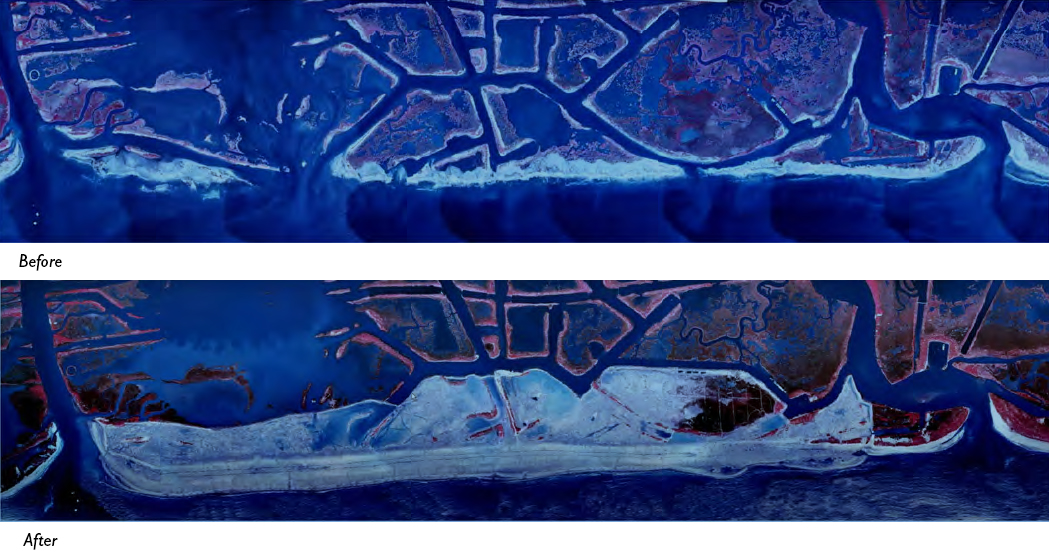
These images show BA-38 Barataria Barrier Island Complex Project: Pelican Island and Pass La Mer to Chaland Pass before and after restoration.

Benefits that CWPPRA projects contribute:

- Protection or reclamation of wetland acreage
- Protection or creation of estuarine and marine habitats
- Natural buffers that mitigate wind, wave and storm surge damage to communities, infrastructure and hurricane protection structures
- Protection of oil and gas pipelines and distribution networks
- Storm floodwater storage
- Filtration and purification of water
- Nurseries for fisheries
- Wildlife habitat
- Data to create a baseline of wetland conditions and to evaluate the efficacy of various approaches to wetland restoration

== CWPPRA task force members ==
The task force consists of the State of Louisiana and five Federal Agencies:

- State of Louisiana Governor's Office
- U.S. Department of Defense
  - (U.S. Army Corps of Engineers (New Orleans District))
- U.S. Department of Interior
  - (U.S. Fish and Wildlife Service)
- U.S. Department of Agriculture
  - (USDA Natural Resources Conservation Service)
- U.S. Department of Commerce
  - (NOAA National Marine Fisheries Service)
- U.S. Environmental Protection Agency

== Hurricane effects ==
In 2005, two of the United States' most devastating hurricanes hit the Gulf Coast (Hurricane Katrina, August 2005; Hurricane Rita, September 2005). Their impact gained national attention due to the vast property damage and loss of life. These two storms also impacted CWPPRA efforts for coastal restoration, for the better. As scientists and policy makers seek ways to protect coastal communities and industries from future hurricanes, they look to the marshes and barrier islands that form the coast's first line of hurricane defense. This is magnifying the importance of CWPPRA and related projects and the necessity for the successful restoration of the coastal wetlands.

More recently, in 2008, Hurricanes Gustav and Ike have left their mark on Louisiana's Coastal Wetlands. Experts are comparing Hurricane Ike's impacts to those of Hurricane Rita in 2005. Assessment of the impact is on-going and may not be fully realized for some time.

== See also ==
- Wetlands of Louisiana
- National Wetlands Research Center
- U.S. Geological Survey
- Coastal Conservation Association
